= No More Mr. Nice Guy (House) =

- House episode
- Episode no.: Season 4 Episode 13
- Directed by: Deran Sarafian
- Written by: David Hoselton; David Shore
- Original air date: April 28, 2008
- Running time: 44 minutes

Guest appearances
- Anne Dudek as Dr. Amber Volakis; Paul Rae as Jeff; Chad Morgan as Deb; Jason Lewis as Evan Greer/Dr. Brock Sterling

Episode chronology
← Previous "Don't Ever Change"	Next → "Living the Dream"
- House season 4

"No More Mr. Nice Guy" is the 13th episode of the fourth season of House, and the 83rd episode overall. It was the first House episode filmed after the resolution of the 2007–2008 Writers Guild of America strike. It was first broadcast on Fox in the United States on April 28, 2008.

The episode revolves around Dr. Gregory House (Hugh Laurie) noticing a man named Jeff (Paul Rae) in the emergency room, whom he thinks is "too nice". House thinks that Jeff's inability to get mad is a symptom of an underlying condition and decides to find out what is wrong with him. Meanwhile, Dr. Eric Foreman (Omar Epps), thinks the other diagnostic team members don't respect him, while Amber Volakis (Anne Dudek) and House try to create a deal in which they can both spend time with Dr. James Wilson (Robert Sean Leonard).

"No More Mr. Nice Guy" was watched by approximately 14 million viewers, making it the night's second most watched program, behind Dancing with the Stars. The episode gained mixed reviews from critics. Mary McNamara of the Los Angeles Times stated that the episode was "the worst House episode ever", while Gina Dinunno of TV Guide commented that she thought the episode was "pretty good".

== Plot ==
The local nurses' union for the Princeton-Plainsboro Teaching Hospital is on strike. Jeff, the husband of one of the nurses, collapses while walking the picket line. At the emergency room, House suspects Jeff's extreme niceness and inability to get angry is a major symptom of an underlying condition. After various tests, the team suspects his niceness is a personality change resulting from syphilis.

At the same time, House is annoyed because he is not able to spend enough time with his friend, James Wilson. He attempts to negotiate with Amber, Wilson's girlfriend, about conditions under which they can both have Wilson's company. They are at a standstill, thus House seeks Lisa Cuddy's (Lisa Edelstein) resolution. However, she will only lay out the conditions if House does his team's performance reviews. House relents and Cuddy sets the rules, although House has Foreman do the team reviews instead.

House manipulates the team, Cameron (Jennifer Morrison), and Chase (Jesse Spencer), by swapping his own blood sample, leading them to believe he too has syphilis, perhaps the cause for his misanthropic personality and unfriendliness. Meanwhile, Foreman believes he isn't getting the respect he deserves from Kutner, Taub (Peter Jacobson) and Thirteen (Olivia Wilde), when he tries to do their performance reviews, which he believes is due to House frequently humiliating him.

After House violates one of the conditions set by Cuddy, Amber informs the team of House's ruse of faking syphilis. This discovery leads Kutner to suspect that Jeff's positive syphilis result might really be the result of Chagas' disease, which he contracted while in the Peace Corp ten years earlier, volunteering in the jungles of Costa Rica. The parasite embedded itself in Jeff's brain during his stay in the country, thus causing the shift in his personality and giving him the inability to be angry.

With the case solved, House hands in the reviews to Cuddy, who discovers they are all the same. As punishment for not doing his team's reviews properly, and for breaking the rules she set between him and Amber, Cuddy has the two of them cleaning up bedridden patients together while outside in the corridor, Wilson smiles to himself, amused at the scene.

== Production ==
"No More Mr. Nice Guy" was the fourth House episode written by David Hoselton and the first he wrote along with David Shore. It was the second House episode directed by Deran Sarafian. When "Don't Ever Change" aired on February 5, 2008, it was the final episode to air before mid-season break due to the 2007–2008 Writers Guild of America strike. On March 25, 2008, Maureen Ryan of the Chicago Tribune reported that House would be returning April 29, 2008. In an interview with the Chicago Tribune, House creator David Shore commented that, although the characters of Cameron and Chase are not on screen as much as they used to be, they take on a different, and greater, weight with the "stuff" they are doing. "No More Mr. Nice Guy" was the first House episode to air after the 2007–2008 Writers Guild of America strike. The nurses' strike in the episode was a reference to the WGA strike. In the episode Jason Lewis made a small uncredited appearance as Dr. Brock Sterling, a fictional doctor in House's favorite soap opera Prescription Passion. Lewis appeared as Evan Greer, the fictional actor who portrays Dr. Sterling, in the next episode.

== Reception ==
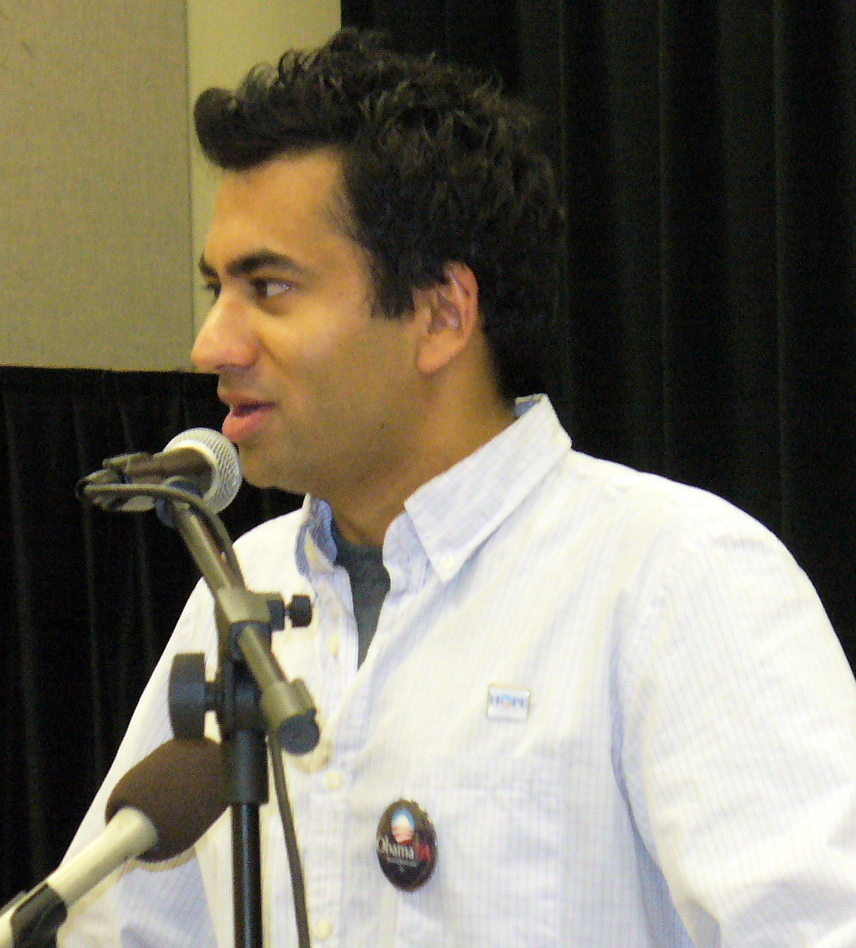
Kal Penn submitted the episode for a Primetime Emmy Award for Outstanding Supporting Actor - Drama Series for his appearance as Lawrence Kutner.

With 14.51 million viewers watching the show, "No More Mr. Nice Guy" was the second-most watched program of the night, ranking behind Dancing with the Stars. The episode gained a 13 share in the ratings. Out of all programs broadcast by Fox Broadcasting Company between April 28 and May 4, House was the third most watched, behind American Idol (Tuesday and Wednesday). Jay Black of TV Squad noted that the first image in the episode after the two-and-a-half month writer's strike-induced break was a picket line. Barbara Barnett of Blog Critics Magazine stated that the episode was "a lot of fun, but slightly disappointing".

James Chamberlin of IGN stated that the scenes in which Amber and House were working out terms for sharing Wilson were "hysterical", and graded the episode with an 8.5 (out of 10). Gina Dinunno of TV Guide thought the episode was pretty good, and the only thing she was not very fond of was that she felt that the characters of Robert Chase and Allison Cameron seemed "forced into the script". Jessica Paff, from Zap2it, reported that she was pleased that the love triangle between House, Amber and Wilson went on, despite House's blessing in the previous episode. Sara Morrison of Television Without Pity said she liked the jokes referring to "Thirteen" being bisexual. She graded the episode with an A+. Kal Penn submitted the episode on his behalf for a Primetime Emmy Award for Outstanding Supporting Actor - Drama Series, but the episode was not ultimately nominated.
