= Whatever It Takes (House) =

- House episode
- Episode no.: Season 4 Episode 6
- Directed by: Juan J. Campanella
- Story by: Thomas L. Moran
- Teleplay by: Thomas L. Moran; Peter Blake
- Original air date: November 6, 2007

Guest appearances
- Anne Dudek as Dr. Amber Volakis; Edi Gathegi as Dr. Jeffrey Cole; Peter Jacobson as Dr. Chris Taub; Kal Penn as Dr. Lawrence Kutner; Olivia Wilde as Dr. Remy "Thirteen" Hadley; Andy Comeau as Dr. Travis Brennan; Amy Dudgeon as Casey Alfonso; Tom Wilson as Lou Alfonso; Holmes Osborne as Dr. Sidney Curtis; Chad Willett as CIA Agent Brian Smith; Joel Bissonnette as CIA Agent John; Michael Michele as Dr. Samira Terzi

Episode chronology
← Previous "Mirror Mirror"	Next → "Ugly"
- House season 4

"Whatever It Takes" is the sixth episode of the fourth season of House and the seventy-sixth episode overall, which aired on Fox on November 6, 2007. In the episode, House consults on a case involving a CIA agent with life-threatening injuries.

== Plot ==
Drag racer Casey Alfonso experiences blurred vision and distorted hearing following a race. House takes the case, hoping that by solving it, he will be able to test drive a dragster. When an agent from the CIA recruits House to help diagnose a mortally ill agent named "John", House puts Foreman in charge of the fellowship candidates and the Alfonso case.

At a CIA hospital, House meets Dr. Samira Terzi, a staff doctor for the CIA, and immunologist Dr. Sidney Curtis from the Mayo Clinic, also brought in to consult. The only information Terzi gives to both doctors is that John was stationed in Bolivia during most of the year and liked to eat chestnuts. When John becomes unresponsive and almost comatose, House suspects Waldenström's and John is treated with plasmapheresis and chemotherapy. Unfortunately, his hair falls out too quickly to be a side effect of the chemotherapy, and House believes John was the target of an assassination attempt.

Back at Princeton-Plainsboro, Foreman believes his patient has multiple sclerosis and begins the treatment of interferon, until Casey develops leg paralysis, due to Chris Taub and Amber putting her on steroids at the same time. Brennan strongly feels it is polio, but his suggestion is immediately turned down, until Brennan returns with positive test results for the condition. Brennan suggests a treatment of vitamin C, which he believes can destroy the polio virus and restore Casey's use of her legs.

Curtis blasts House for misdiagnosing John, and due to the bone marrow damage caused by the radiation sickness, he does not have long to live. While House is sitting at his bedside, John tells him of his time in Bolivia, but House realizes John was actually in Brazil. This leads House to infer that, rather than chestnuts, John had eaten large quantities of Brazil nuts (called "castanhas-do-Pará", literally "chestnuts of Pará" in Brazilian Portuguese), which naturally contain a high level of selenium. House informs Terzi and puts John in chelation therapy; although the agent does not see why House is angry if the treatment is successful even with imprecise information.

Back at Princeton-Plainsboro Hospital, Foreman shows House the inconsistencies involving Casey, and House suggests her symptoms fit either because she has polio, or because she actually had heat stroke, but someone poisoned her with thallium. The fault lies on Brennan, who admits to the scam, saying it was necessary to prove the vitamin C treatment was reliable. House does not fire Brennan because he did what he believed, but he tells him to quit instead. After Brennan's quick exit, Foreman angrily protests that House is going to let him get away with deliberately poisoning a patient. House counters by saying he just wanted Brennan out of the room, stating he is ethically insane, while notifying Foreman to call the authorities.
