= You Don't Want to Know =

- House episode
- Episode no.: Season 4 Episode 8
- Directed by: Lesli Linka Glatter
- Written by: Sara Hess
- Original air date: November 20, 2007

Guest appearances
- Anne Dudek as Dr. Amber Volakis; Edi Gathegi as Dr. Jeffrey Cole; Peter Jacobson as Dr. Chris Taub; Kal Penn as Dr. Lawrence Kutner; Olivia Wilde as Dr. Remy "Thirteen" Hadley; Steve Valentine as Flynn

Episode chronology
← Previous "Ugly"	Next → "Games"
- House season 4

"You Don't Want to Know" is the eighth episode of the fourth season of the American TV drama House and the seventy-eighth episode overall. It aired on 20 November 2007. Notably, in this episode the differential diagnosis is confirmed as lupus, contradicting the eponymous Dr. Gregory House's catchphrase that "it's never lupus."

== Plot ==
Flynn, a magician, collapses during a performance and is brought to Princeton-Plainsboro. House and his team initially suspect several conditions, including tularemia and amyloidosis, as Flynn suffers from worsening symptoms such as internal bleeding and seizures. After a failed blood transfusion experiment involving House, they discover Flynn had been given the wrong blood type, leading House to diagnose autoimmune hemolytic anemia caused by systemic lupus erythematosus. Despite House's famous insistence throughout the series that "It's never lupus," this case turns out to be lupus, marking a rare exception to the series rule.

Alongside the medical case, House challenges his fellows to steal Lisa Cuddy’s underwear in a contest. Cole wins, but House fires him for breaking the rules by involving Cuddy in the scheme, as the contest was intended to test their ability to outwit her without getting caught. Thirteen also deals with her fear of having Huntington's disease, ultimately choosing not to know the results of a genetic test House secretly conducted.
