= Ugly (House) =

- House episode
- Episode no.: Season 4 Episode 7
- Directed by: David Straiton
- Written by: Sean Whitesell
- Original air date: November 13, 2007
- Running time: 44 minutes

Guest appearances
- Anne Dudek as Dr. Amber Volakis; Edi Gathegi as Dr. Jeffrey Cole; Peter Jacobson as Dr. Chris Taub; Kal Penn as Dr. Lawrence Kutner; Olivia Wilde as Dr. Remy "Thirteen" Hadley; Khleo Thomas as Kenny Arnold; Laurie Fortier as Darnell; Michael Whaley as Joe Arnold; David Campbell as Taub's former plastic surgeon partner; Michael Adler as Cameron's ER patient; Michael Michele as Dr. Samira Terzi

Episode chronology
← Previous "Whatever It Takes"	Next → "You Don't Want to Know"
- House season 4

"Ugly" is the seventh episode of the fourth season of House and the seventy-seventh episode overall. It aired on Fox on November 13, 2007. The episode revolves around a teenager named Kenny Arnold with a major facial deformity. He is set to get surgery in order to remove the deformity, but has a heart attack just prior to the surgery. Dr. Gregory House, who still has not hired a new diagnostic team out of six interns, tries to figure out what is wrong with Kenny. Kenny was being filmed by a documentary crew during the process of the surgery. House has to find out what is wrong with Kenny while being filmed by the crew.

The episode was watched by 11.4 million viewers, making it the eighth most-watched program of the week in the US. The episode gained positive reviews by critics, who were surprised by the story surrounding Dr. Chris Taub, one of the fellowship applicants, in the episode.

== Plot ==
A documentary film crew is chronicling a teenager named Kenny with a major facial deformity who opts to undergo a dramatic reconstructive procedure. When Kenny suffers a heart attack just prior to the surgery, House and the team are called in to determine the cause.

As the film crew continues to document Kenny, House becomes increasingly annoyed and tries to avoid them by briefing his team by the MRI machine and in surgery. However, ultimately he cannot escape the cameras and the candidates find themselves acting self-consciously in front of the lens. Meanwhile, House begins to regret recruiting former CIA doctor Samira Terzi when she fails to demonstrate the intelligence he witnessed at Langley. During the episode the film crew also interviews Cameron, asking why she resigned and making it look like she was romantically attracted to House.

Dr. Taub, using his experience as a plastic surgeon, gains Kenny's and his father's trust and frequently clashes with House on the diagnosis. House believes Kenny is suffering from juvenile idiopathic arthritis while Taub believes it is merely the side effects of increased intracranial pressure. By persuading Kenny's father not to follow House's treatment and by attempting to kick him off the case, House fires Taub, only to have his decision reversed by Cuddy. Ultimately both House and Taub are proven wrong when Thirteen realizes Kenny is suffering from Lyme disease, with the telltale rash hidden by his hair.

In the end, Taub is not fired, but Dr. Terzi is let go and House's request for a date is turned down. Cuddy and House watch an early cut of the documentary, which has been edited to portray House as a compassionate, sympathetic doctor. House is aghast and leaves the room, questioning whether he can still trust Michael Moore movies. The documentary continues, revealing that the surgery was successful, and that Kenny thanks Dr. House.

== Production ==
The episode was written by Sean Whitesell, who had previously worked as co-executive producer on the series. To date, this is the only House episode Whitesell has written. The episode became the second House episode to be directed by David Straiton, who had previously directed "Family". "Ugly" featured the second appearance of Dr. Samira Terzi (Michael Michele), who made her first appearance in "Whatever it Takes". Michele had previously played a doctor named Cleo Finch on the medical drama ER. Omar Epps, who stars in House as Dr. Eric Foreman, also starred on ER, but two years before Michele. As usual, the filming took place on the Fox lot in Century City. This episode contained the song 'My home is your head' by Joseph Arthur.

== Reception ==
The episode was the eighth most-watched program of the week along with NBC's Sunday Night Football, with 11.4 million viewers, it received a 17 share in the ratings. Overall, the episode was well received by critics. Nina Hämmerling Smith of TV Guide quoted: "Perhaps the best thing about the episode was the amount of screen time given to old favorites like Wilson (Robert Sean Leonard) and Cuddy (Lisa Edelstein). The show's most convincing writing has always been in the scenes when those two spar with House, and I was thrilled to see more of that". Most critics were surprised and interested by the performance of Chris Taub in this episode. Richard Keller of TV Squad, wrote that he was almost certain of the fact that Taub was going to be fired and he was glad that he wasn't. He also quoted, "For some reason I like Taub. Maybe because he's not pretty like the rest of them. He's just an everyday schlub who's a pretty decent doctor".

Buzz Byrne from Critics Rant called Taub, "interesting". James Chamberlin of IGN did not think that the black and white documentary really worked for him, and when it was over he didn't feel like he had just watched an episode of House. Chamberlin graded the episode with a 7.7. Michelle Romero, of Entertainment Weekly commented "I loved it when House told his crew that she Dr. Terzi got the gig because she had more experience than the swimsuit model". Television without Pity graded the episode with a B− (out of 84 votes). According to Glen L. Diaz, of BuddyTV, various fans think that the smile on Cuddy's face at the end of the episode explains everything about how she thinks of House. Peter Jacobson submitted the episode for a Primetime Emmy Award on his behalf in the category Outstanding Supporting Actor in a Drama Series. Sean Whitesell submitted the episode on his behalf in the category Outstanding Writing in a Drama Series. Neither nomination came through.
