= Mirror Mirror (House) =

- House episode
- Episode no.: Season 4 Episode 5
- Directed by: David Platt
- Written by: David Foster
- Original air date: October 30, 2007

Guest appearances
- Anne Dudek as Dr. Amber Volakis; Edi Gathegi as Dr. Jeffrey Cole; Peter Jacobson as Dr. Chris Taub; Kal Penn as Dr. Lawrence Kutner; Olivia Wilde as Dr. Remy "Thirteen" Hadley; Andy Comeau as Dr. Travis Brennan; Frank Whaley as Robert Elliot/Mr. X

Episode chronology
← Previous "Guardian Angels"	Next → "Whatever It Takes"
- House season 4

"Mirror Mirror" is the fifth episode of the fourth season of House and the seventy-fifth episode overall. It aired on Fox on October 30, 2007.

== Plot ==
=== Medicine ===
House's team gets a patient (Frank Whaley) with breathing problems with no apparent cause. He was just robbed and does not have I.D. on him, and they do not have his past medical records. Foreman suggests it might be a result of a vocal cord spasm, and they give him methacholine which would worsen it and thus provide a diagnosis. The patient complains of additional symptoms, and Foreman determines that he is faking them. His alleged symptoms are the same as those of other patients, and the name he gave them was the same as the paramedic. Foreman thinks he might have Munchausens, but House thinks it might be a rare form of anterograde amnesia known as Giovannini mirror syndrome (named after Giovannina Conchiglia) that causes a patient to mimic those around him. House suggests that they try to convince the patient that he is a doctor, since a mirror syndrome patient would be convinced, but a Munchausens patient would not. They go to one of Wilson's surgeries, and the patient acts like a doctor. Specifically, he acts like Wilson. Wilson later notes that mirror patients always mirror the most dominant person in the room, which means that Wilson was more dominant than House. House explains that as a consequence of the fact that Wilson was in charge of the surgery.

House notices that the patient's blood thickens dangerously when his body temperature drops (cold agglutinin disease), something that cannot be faked. They look for an infection that could have caused it. The patient has his car keys on him, so House sends Cole to look for the patient's car, and Thirteen volunteers to go along. Brennan suggests that the patient might have a fungus, but the cure does not work. They put the patient in a hot tub to keep him warm. House suggests they get a medical history by checking his blood for antibodies. The test reveals that he has had histoplasmosis, a disease common in Ohio, but also coccidioidomycosis, residing in southwestern US, and Chagas disease, pointing to Central America. The patient has heart problems, so Foreman suggests they biopsy the heart. Brennan says that will kill him since the patient just had a heart attack. Foreman then makes a House-like statement, sarcastically saying "We biopsy his toe instead". House tells everyone to biopsy the patient's heart, which reveals nothing.

Cole and Thirteen find the patient's car, which allows them to determine his name, his hometown, and that he carries vaporub. The patient earlier said he liked hot tubs in the presence of Kutner, who later states he hates hot tubs. This evidence shows the patient was capable of thinking for himself, so House pretends to be the patient, so that when the patient mirrored him, he would say more about himself. The patient says he was on the road a lot, and he used the vaporub to block out the smell of dung. House infers that the patient sells farm equipment, and is around pigs a lot, and correctly diagnoses him with eperythrozoon, an infection that occurs in pigs.

Chase takes bets on who will be fired at the end of the case. House does not fire any of the candidates, so Chase wins all the bets. House confirms Foreman's suspicion that he was in the gambling with Chase on the bets and received 50% of the money. As they walk away, "We're Going to Be Friends" by The White Stripes plays, suggesting House and Foreman might begin to get along better, perhaps because they are so similar.

=== Foreman, Cuddy, and House ===
House didn't want Cuddy to rehire Foreman, and they get into a power struggle. To waste Cuddy's time, House tells the people in the cafeteria that the food was spoiled, and they should all go to the clinic. Then he orders unnecessary, expensive tests for the uninsured clinic patients. In retaliation, Cuddy replaces House's Vicodin with laxatives. House responds, "I know when my Vicodin isn't Vicodin. Do you know when your birth control pills aren't birth control pills?"

House realizes that no one is going to back down. (His exact quotation is "No one's going to be happy here... and Cuddy's going to end up pregnant.") So House tells Foreman he got him a job somewhere else. At first, Foreman claimed that he was miserable working with House again. But when the patient was mirroring Foreman, he said that he liked being there. Foreman realized he did like being back, and he says he doesn't want House to get him a job somewhere else.

Foreman suggests that House and Cuddy both talk to the patient at once, to see which one the patient would mirror (the patient mirrors the person he thinks is in charge). Foreman says that if the patient thinks House is dominant over Cuddy, he'll take that other job, until Wilson suggests that House was lying when he said he got Foreman another job. In the patient's room, with everyone watching outside through the glass, the patient tells them both to shut up and says that Cuddy has "great yabbos" (breasts). House takes this as confirmation that the patient is mirroring him, but Cuddy claims that's something she might have said as she has always considered her breasts to be one of her best features. The scene cuts to Foreman and Wilson, where Foreman simply says, "Damn" and we see House dancing in celebration and mimicking shooting Foreman with his cane as an imaginary machine gun.

=== Mirroring ===
The patient's mirroring gave several people insights about themselves. When he was mirroring Amber, he said that she had to be right since no one likes her and she 'had to be right, otherwise she wasn't worth anything'. When he was mirroring Taub, he said that he was attracted to Amber's dominant and aggressive personality. When he was mirroring Brennan, he said that he didn't like being in this hospital. In response to that, Brennan told House that he was going to quit and go back to his old job when the patient was cured, although he didn't end up quitting. When the patient was mirroring Kutner, he said that he was obsessed with new things and that he likes pain. When House brings the patient into an OR where Wilson is performing surgery, House and Wilson bicker for a minute until the patient begins mirroring Wilson. As Wilson points out later, this suggests that Wilson is the dominant one in House and Wilson's relationship.

House suggests that Thirteen went to find the patient's car, because she didn't want to see what the patient would say if he mirrored her. House wanted to find out what he'd say, so House and Thirteen went to see the patient together, but the patient commented emphatically on how attractive Thirteen was. House, believing the patient to be mirroring him, leaves the room. The patient, alone with Thirteen, said he was scared and it wasn't going to be alright.

At the end of the episode, after House has made the diagnosis, Foreman suggests a playful experiment, and they put the treatment on hold and get Cuddy. Since the patient had been mirroring whoever was the "alpha" in the room, House and Cuddy stand in front of him trying to argue over which of them is the "alpha". After momentary confusion, the patient eventually tells Cuddy, "you have great yabbos", mimicking House's thoughts.

==== The 'real' Giovannini mirror syndrome ====
Giovannini's Mirror Syndrome is a highly fictionalized version of a condition treated by Giovannina Conchiglia in Italy in 2007. The real-life patient suffered frontal temporal brain damage and took cues based on his environment to develop his character. His role remained the same until the situation changed. The role switching was in addition to anterograde amnesia and anosognosia. The researchers stated that the patient "seems to have lost the capacity to keep his own identity constant, as he adapts himself excessively to variations in the social contexts, violating his own identity connotations in order to favour a role which the environment proposes".
