= House season 4 =

House
- Season 4
- Season 4 DVD cover
- Starring: Hugh Laurie; Lisa Edelstein; Omar Epps; Robert Sean Leonard; Jennifer Morrison; Jesse Spencer; Peter Jacobson; Kal Penn; Olivia Wilde
- No. of episodes: 16

Release
- Original network: Fox
- Original release: September 25, 2007 – May 19, 2008

Season chronology
- ← Previous; Season 3 Next → Season 5

The fourth season of House, also known as House, M.D., premiered on September 25, 2007 and ended May 19, 2008. This is the last season to be produced by NBC Universal Television Studio, which was succeeded by Universal Media Studios on June 14, 2007. "Whatever It Takes" was the final episode to feature the NBC Universal Television Studio logo. Having previously fired Chase, and with Foreman and Cameron quitting, House starts a competition between 40 applicants for the vacant positions. He eventually narrows them down to seven, firing one each episode. In the episode "Games", he fires Amber Volakis (Anne Dudek), hiring Dr. Chris Taub (Peter Jacobson), Dr. Lawrence Kutner (Kal Penn) and Dr. Remy "Thirteen" Hadley (Olivia Wilde) as his new team. Dr. Foreman rejoins the team after his dismissal from another hospital. Meanwhile, Amber begins a relationship with Wilson.

When production of the season was interrupted by the 2007–2008 Writers Guild of America strike, the number of episodes was reduced to 16 instead of the planned 24. Executive producer Katie Jacobs explained that it was hard for the writers to finish the story arcs started during the season with eight fewer episodes. Season four also introduced seven actors to the cast; in addition to Jacobson, Penn, and Wilde, who became regulars, Andy Comeau portrayed Travis Brennan, an epidemiologist; Edi Gathegi played Jeffrey Cole, a geneticist; Carmen Argenziano appeared as Henry Dobson, a former medical school admissions officer; and Anne Dudek portrayed Amber Volakis, an interventional radiologist. Each of the four departed the show after elimination, except for Volakis, who remained recurring until the finale, having started a relationship with Wilson.

== Cast and characters ==
=== Main cast ===
- Hugh Laurie as Dr. Gregory House
- Lisa Edelstein as Dr. Lisa Cuddy
- Omar Epps as Dr. Eric Foreman (episodes 2–16)
- Robert Sean Leonard as Dr. James Wilson
- Jennifer Morrison as Dr. Allison Cameron (episodes 2–7, 9–11 and 13–16)
- Jesse Spencer as Dr. Robert Chase (episodes 2–7, 9–10 and 12–16)
- Peter Jacobson as Dr. Chris Taub (episodes 10–16, recurring episodes 2–9)
- Kal Penn as Dr. Lawrence Kutner (episodes 10–16, recurring episodes 2–9)
- Olivia Wilde as Dr. Remy 'Thirteen' Hadley (episodes 10–16, recurring episodes 2–9)

=== Recurring cast ===
- Anne Dudek as Dr. Amber Volakis
- Edi Gathegi as Dr. Jeffrey "Big Love" Cole
- Andy Comeau as Dr. Travis "Grumpy" Brennan
- Carmen Argenziano as Henry Dobson
- Michael Michele as Dr. Samira Terzi
- Meera Simhan as Dr. Jody Desai
- Melinda Dahl as Doctor #15A
- Caitlin Dahl as Doctor #15B
- Kathryn Adams as Doctor #23
- Jennifer Crystal Foley as Rachel Taub
- Maurice Godin as Dr. Lawrence Hourani

=== Guest cast ===
Michael Adler, Kristina Anapau, Julie Ariola, Essence Atkins, Rob Benedict, Eli Bildner, Joel Bissonnette, David Campbell, Matt DeCaro, Dan Desmond, Conor Dubin, Amy Dudgeon, Fred Durst, Laurie Fortier, Heather Fox, Jennifer Hall, Henry Hayashi, Jeff Hephner, Charlie Hofheimer, Brian Klugman, Caroline Lagerfelt, Kay Lenz, Jason Lewis, Liana Liberato, Nick McCallum, Ivana Miličević, Pat Millicano, Janel Moloney, Chad Morgan, Jason Manuel Olazabal, Holmes Osborne, Eyal Podell, Bevin Prince, Paul Rae, Jeremy Renner, Reynaldo Rosales, Jonathan Sadowski, Mary Kate Schellhardt, Azura Skye, Laura Silverman, Scott Alan Smith, Mira Sorvino, Douglas Spain, Anthony Starke, Khleo Thomas, Steve Valentine, Alex Weed, Frank Whaley, Michael Whaley, Chad Willett, Thomas F. Wilson, Tom Wright and Kathleen York.

== Episodes ==
No. overall	No. in season	Title	Directed by	Written by	Original release date	US viewers (millions)
71	1	"Alone"	Deran Sarafian	Story by : Peter Blake; Teleplay by : Peter Blake & David Shore	September 25, 2007	18.31
When an office building collapses, House has to work fast to diagnose a young woman, Megan (Bevin Prince), who has managed to survive the disaster. Without a team, House talks through his ideas with a janitor at Princeton-Plainsboro. As House persists in diagnosing Megan by himself, he soon realizes the case is not what it appears to be and that solitude may not be the answer. Final diagnosis: Demerol and antidepressant interaction, delirium tremens, interaction between the pill and other blood thinners, and allergy to cephalosporin (Liz); mistaken identity (Megan)
72	2	"The Right Stuff"	Deran Sarafian	Doris Egan & Leonard Dick	October 2, 2007	17.44
House systematically begins eliminating his new team candidates, until he is approached by a fighter pilot named Greta (Essence Atkins), a candidate for NASA's astronaut training program. Greta suffers from a neurological disorder, where she converts sounds to visual images. Knowing NASA will reject any possibility of her becoming an astronaut if they knew of her problem, Greta begs House to treat her in secret. Meanwhile, House is ruffled when he thinks he sees Cameron, Chase and Foreman in the hospital hallways. Final diagnosis: Von Hippel–Lindau disease
73	3	"97 Seconds"	David Platt	Russel Friend & Garrett Lerner	October 9, 2007	18.03
The final ten fellowship candidates compete ferociously against each other when House splits them into two teams by gender. They are assigned to diagnose and treat a wheelchair user (Brian Klugman) with spinal muscular atrophy who is slowly suffocating. As the teams try to outdo the other, complications arise. Meanwhile, Foreman runs his own team at another hospital, and resorts to using a very "House-like" treatment to help a patient. Final diagnosis: Strongyloidiasis
74	4	"Guardian Angels"	Deran Sarafian	David Hoselton	October 23, 2007	18.11
While having a seizure, a funeral home cosmetician (Azura Skye) hallucinates she is being violently raped by one of the cadavers. When she is admitted to the hospital, she acts as though her dead mother is in the room with her. While Cameron offers advice to one of the remaining candidates for House's team, a recently fired Foreman has lunch with Cuddy, discussing his current situation. Final diagnosis: Ergotism
75	5	"Mirror Mirror"	David Platt	David Foster	October 30, 2007	17.30
Foreman returns to Princeton-Plainsboro and is assigned to oversee House's candidates. A man (Frank Whaley) is mugged and suffers from a respiratory arrest. Though he has no memories of who he is, he can read the personality of the most dominant person in the room, applying it to himself to create a temporary identity. This is due to a rare disease known as Giovannini Mirror Syndrome. House becomes intrigued by the accuracy of this judge of character and manipulates the patient to judge others, while a team member wonders if House is more dominant than Cuddy. Final diagnosis: Eperythrozoon infection (resulting from exposure to pig feces)
76	6	"Whatever It Takes"	Juan J. Campanella	Story by : Thomas L. Moran; Teleplay by : Thomas L. Moran & Peter Blake	November 6, 2007	18.17
House is recruited by the CIA to help diagnose a deathly ill agent (Joel Bissonnette). The agent's case is spearheaded by Dr. Samira Terzi, who offers very little information on the agent's history or previous assignments. With limited information, House uses some unorthodox methods to try to determine a diagnosis in time to save his patient's life. Meanwhile, Foreman faces a huge uphill battle from the remaining fellowship candidates when they start questioning his judgment while arguing over the proper diagnosis of a female drag car racer (Amy Dudgeon) who passes out after a race. Final diagnosis: Selenosis (John) and Heat stroke, followed by deliberate in-hospital Thallium poisoning to mimic Polio (Casey)
77	7	"Ugly"	David Straiton	Sean Whitesell	November 13, 2007	16.95
House and his team are followed by a documentary film crew as they treat a teenager (Khleo Thomas) with a major facial deformity, who suffers a heart attack prior to a reconstructive procedure. As they work to diagnose the teen, House finds himself distracted by several of the candidates vying for a spot on his team, causing him to question his own motives for having chosen them. Final diagnosis: Lyme disease
78	8	"You Don't Want to Know"	Lesli Linka Glatter	Sara Hess	November 20, 2007	16.89
House encounters a magician (Steve Valentine) whose heart fails when performing an underwater escape act. While the remaining fellowship candidates work to diagnose him, House is determined to prove he is a scam artist faking his ailments to cover up the fact he nearly drowned during his act. In the meantime, House pits his team against one another in a challenge involving Cuddy, granting the winner immunity from elimination and a chance to nominate two other candidates to be put on the chopping block. Final diagnosis: Autoimmune hemolytic anemia in systemic lupus erythematosus Absent: Jennifer Morrison as Allison Cameron and Jesse Spencer as Robert Chase
79	9	"Games"	Deran Sarafian	Eli Attie	November 27, 2007	16.97
House assigns the candidates to a particularly challenging case involving an uncooperative punk guitarist (Jeremy Renner) with a history of drug abuse and civil disobedience, while Cuddy orders House to make a final decision and hire his new team. House promises a guaranteed position for the candidate who correctly diagnoses the patient. Meanwhile, Wilson informs a former patient he misdiagnosed him with terminal cancer and is now going to live and must deal with the consequences of his procedures. Final diagnosis: Measles
80	10	"It's a Wonderful Lie"	Matt Shakman	Pamela Davis	January 29, 2008	22.56
House and his new team composed of the three lucky applicants, Chris Taub, Lawrence Kutner and Remy “Thirteen” Hadley treat a woman (Janel Moloney) who suffers from a sudden paralysis of the hands, causing an injury to her daughter while she is watching her at an indoor rock-climbing wall. As House probes the woman and her injured daughter for any leads as to what might be causing her condition, he becomes convinced that the mother is withholding information. Final diagnosis: Breast cancer in displaced breast tissue
81	11	"Frozen"	David Straiton	Liz Friedman	February 3, 2008	29.05
When Dr. Cate Milton (Mira Sorvino), a psychiatrist trapped in the South Pole and the research station's only doctor, becomes ill in the middle of her assignment, she and House are thrust into a long-distance relationship of sorts. Unable to get Cate out or any additional medical supplies to the South Pole station, House and his team must resort to treating her via webcam. Meanwhile, House sends Taub, Kutner and Thirteen to harass Cameron until she gets cable for his office and he attempts to discover the identity of Wilson's new girlfriend. This episode originally aired in North America, outside of its regular time slot, immediately following Fox's broadcast of the Super Bowl XLII post-game show. Final diagnosis: Fat embolism from unrepaired broken toe Absent: Jesse Spencer as Robert Chase
82	12	"Don't Ever Change"	Deran Sarafian	Doris Egan & Leonard Dick	February 5, 2008	23.16
House and the team encounters a woman (Laura Silverman) admitted to Princeton-Plainsboro after she collapses at her wedding. Her test results come up negative for a variety of common diseases, which leads the team to suspect foul play, but when they discover the woman is a former music producer living in the fast lane until she began to practice Hasidic Judaism, House insists people do not change, and her seemingly rash decision may be a symptom of the underlying condition. Final diagnosis: Nephroptosis Absent: Jennifer Morrison as Allison Cameron
83	13	"No More Mr. Nice Guy"	Deran Sarafian	David Hoselton & David Shore	April 28, 2008	14.64
House suspects an emergency room patient (Paul Rae) has a bigger problem than the E.R. initially diagnosed based on the fact that the patient is too nice. A skeptical House questions the patient's sunny disposition as the team tries to get to the bottom of his illness, but disagrees with House that niceness is a symptom. Meanwhile, House is at odds with Wilson's girlfriend, Amber, about how much time they each get to spend with Wilson, and Cuddy demands House give his team performance reviews. Final diagnosis: Chagas disease
84	14	"Living the Dream"	David Straiton	Sara Hess & Liz Friedman	May 5, 2008	13.48
House is convinced one of the actors on his favorite soap opera (Jason Lewis) has a serious medical condition, after observing his symptoms on television. He decides to intervene and take matters into his own hands, but both the actor and House's team dismiss his assessment and do not believe there is anything wrong. Meanwhile, Wilson and Amber have their first argument and Cuddy tries to keep up appearances when an inspector makes an unexpected visit to Princeton-Plainsboro. Final diagnosis: Hypersensitivity vasculitis due to Quinine allergy
85	15	"House's Head"	Greg Yaitanes	Story by : Doris Egan; Teleplay by : Peter Blake & David Foster & Russel Friend & Garrett Lerner	May 12, 2008	15.02
House finds himself dazed, confused and covered in blood after surviving a bus accident that left dozens seriously injured. Unable to clearly recall the events leading up to the crash due to his head injuries, House is convinced through his flashbacks a fellow bus passenger is exhibiting signs of a deadly illness prior to the crash. Much to the team's dismay, House pushes through the pain of his injuries, desperate to piece together the fragments of his shattered memory in order to save someone who might not even know he could be dying. And once he learns the truth, he and his team are left shellshocked when it's discovered that Amber Volakis, Wilson's girlfriend, is the one who's dying. Final diagnosis: Displaced Air embolism from dental surgery causing myoclonic jerk
86	16	"Wilson's Heart"	Katie Jacobs	Peter Blake, David Foster, Russel Friend & Garrett Lerner	May 19, 2008	16.36
As the team rushes to find the underlying cause of Amber's injuries, clues inside House's head may hold the key and House's friendship with Wilson is tested as memories from the bus accident the night before threaten their relationship. Meanwhile, Thirteen struggles to cope with her own personal health problems whilst treating Amber. Final diagnosis: Amantadine poisoning due to kidney trauma

== DVD releases ==
Set details				Special features
Country	North America	United Kingdom	Australia	Bonus Featurettes: House's Soap – Prescription Passion; New Beginnings; Meet the Writers; The Visual Effects of House; Anatomy of a Scene – The Bus Crash; My Favourite Episode So Far…; Episode Commentary; "House's Head" with Creator/Executive Producer David Shore and Executive Producer Katie Jacobs
# episodes	16			Bonus Featurettes: House's Soap – Prescription Passion; New Beginnings; Meet the Writers; The Visual Effects of House; Anatomy of a Scene – The Bus Crash; My Favourite Episode So Far…; Episode Commentary; "House's Head" with Creator/Executive Producer David Shore and Executive Producer Katie Jacobs
Aspect ratio	1.78:1			Bonus Featurettes: House's Soap – Prescription Passion; New Beginnings; Meet the Writers; The Visual Effects of House; Anatomy of a Scene – The Bus Crash; My Favourite Episode So Far…; Episode Commentary; "House's Head" with Creator/Executive Producer David Shore and Executive Producer Katie Jacobs
Running time	660 minutes	672 minutes	674 minutes	Bonus Featurettes: House's Soap – Prescription Passion; New Beginnings; Meet the Writers; The Visual Effects of House; Anatomy of a Scene – The Bus Crash; My Favourite Episode So Far…; Episode Commentary; "House's Head" with Creator/Executive Producer David Shore and Executive Producer Katie Jacobs
Audio	Dolby Digital 5.1			Bonus Featurettes: House's Soap – Prescription Passion; New Beginnings; Meet the Writers; The Visual Effects of House; Anatomy of a Scene – The Bus Crash; My Favourite Episode So Far…; Episode Commentary; "House's Head" with Creator/Executive Producer David Shore and Executive Producer Katie Jacobs
Subtitles	English, Spanish	—N/a	none	Bonus Featurettes: House's Soap – Prescription Passion; New Beginnings; Meet the Writers; The Visual Effects of House; Anatomy of a Scene – The Bus Crash; My Favourite Episode So Far…; Episode Commentary; "House's Head" with Creator/Executive Producer David Shore and Executive Producer Katie Jacobs
# of discs	4			Bonus Featurettes: House's Soap – Prescription Passion; New Beginnings; Meet the Writers; The Visual Effects of House; Anatomy of a Scene – The Bus Crash; My Favourite Episode So Far…; Episode Commentary; "House's Head" with Creator/Executive Producer David Shore and Executive Producer Katie Jacobs
Region	1 (NTSC)	2, 4, 5 (PAL)	2, 4, 5 (PAL)	Bonus Featurettes: House's Soap – Prescription Passion; New Beginnings; Meet the Writers; The Visual Effects of House; Anatomy of a Scene – The Bus Crash; My Favourite Episode So Far…; Episode Commentary; "House's Head" with Creator/Executive Producer David Shore and Executive Producer Katie Jacobs
Rating	NOT RATED	15	M	Bonus Featurettes: House's Soap – Prescription Passion; New Beginnings; Meet the Writers; The Visual Effects of House; Anatomy of a Scene – The Bus Crash; My Favourite Episode So Far…; Episode Commentary; "House's Head" with Creator/Executive Producer David Shore and Executive Producer Katie Jacobs
Release date	August 19, 2008	October 27, 2008	August 2008	Bonus Featurettes: House's Soap – Prescription Passion; New Beginnings; Meet the Writers; The Visual Effects of House; Anatomy of a Scene – The Bus Crash; My Favourite Episode So Far…; Episode Commentary; "House's Head" with Creator/Executive Producer David Shore and Executive Producer Katie Jacobs
