= Living the Dream (House) =

- House episode
- Episode no.: Season 4 Episode 14
- Directed by: David Straiton
- Written by: Sara Hess; Liz Friedman
- Original air date: April 28, 2008
- Running time: 44 minutes

Guest appearances
- Anne Dudek as Dr. Amber Volakis; Rob Benedict as Dr. Jaime Conway; Kristina Anapau as Marie; Jason Lewis as Evan Greer/Dr. Brock Sterling

Episode chronology
← Previous "No More Mr. Nice Guy"	Next → "House's Head"
- House season 4

"Living the Dream" is the fourteenth episode of the fourth season of House, and aired on Fox on May 5, 2008.

== Plot ==
House (Hugh Laurie) is convinced that one of the actors on his favorite soap opera "Prescription: Passion" (guest star Jason Lewis) has a serious medical condition after observing his symptoms on television. House decides to intervene, kidnaps the actor and convinces him to run a test, but both the actor and House’s own team dismiss House’s assessment and do not believe there is anything wrong with him. However, the actor develops more symptoms: His leg goes numb preventing him from leaving the hospital, and after subsequent tests and more symptoms he eventually goes into a coma. The team gives him antibiotics for a possible infection, but when this has no effect House has an epiphany and administers steroids for a floral allergy. The steroids work but the floral allergy test comes back negative. Not until after the actor has been discharged does House realize that he is allergic to quinine from the tonic water in the fake gin and tonics that he has to drink on set.

Cuddy (Lisa Edelstein) tries to keep up appearances when an inspector makes an unexpected visit to Princeton-Plainsboro. House takes advantage of this, threatening not to cooperate if he doesn’t get what he wants (like the flat-screen from the doctors’ lounge). When Cuddy says: "Me keeping my job is good for you," House simply replies: "Yes, but it’s better for you."

Meanwhile, Amber (Anne Dudek) and Wilson’s (Robert Sean Leonard) relationship develops. They go mattress-shopping, and when they each want a different mattress, Amber leaves it up to Wilson. On advice from House, Wilson chooses Amber’s preference, but it turns out Amber was testing Wilson: she wanted to see if he’d take care of himself first – that’s what she wants him to do because that’s what she does herself. So Wilson exchanges the mattress for the water bed he has always wanted. In the end, however, Wilson finds that he hates the water bed and cannot sleep on it, forcing him to sleep on the floor. He and Amber decide to return the bed.

== Reception ==
The episode was watched by 13.26 million viewers, making it the fourth most watched program of the night, behind Two and a Half Men, CSI: Miami and Dancing with the Stars. The episode also scored a 5.0/13 share in the 18–49 demographic, which was the highest score of the night. James Chamberlin of IGN was pleased to see Cameron get more screentime. Sarah Collins of North by Northwestern felt the episode proved that House is a "whack job." Noel Murray, writing for A.V. Club, rated the episode A− and said, " The POW and his SUS were fairly typical this week, but the evidence-gathering had some new wrinkles, and the show ventured a little outside the themes it's been exhausting lately."
