= Khleo Thomas =

American actor, rapper, singer, and entertainer

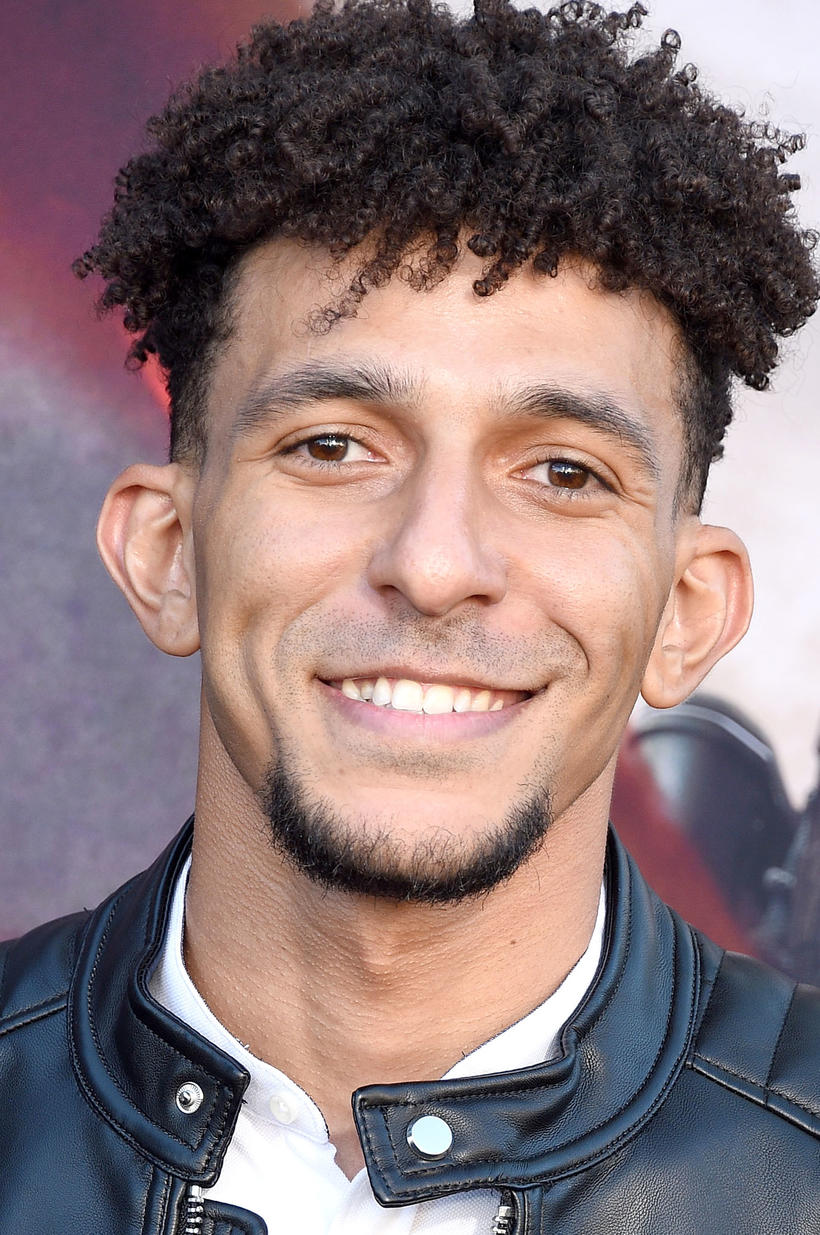
- Thomas in 2019
- Born: Khaleed Leon Thomas; January 30, 1989 (age 37); Anchorage, Alaska, U.S.
- Occupations: Actor, rapper
- Years active: 1998–present
- Height: 6'1
- Musical career
- Genres: Hip hop, R&B
- Labels: Slick Living, Executive Dream, Executive Music, Fontana, UMG, The Plus
- Website: www.khleothomas.com

Khaleed "Khleo" Leon Thomas (born January 30, 1989) is an American actor, rapper, and content creator. First garnering recognition as a child actor with his portrayal Hector "Zero" Zeroni in the film Holes (2003), he has since appeared in films including Walking Tall, Roll Bounce, Remember the Daze, and Hurricane Season, and on television shows including ER, The Bernie Mac Show, House, Sons of Anarchy, Bones, Being Mary Jane, Major Crimes, and Shameless. As a rapper, he has released two EPs and toured alongside Bow Wow, Snoop Dogg, Ice Cube, Sean Kingston and Chris Brown.

Thomas created and runs the lifestyle brands Slick Living and Goddess Living Among Men (GLAM). He appeared in the video game NBA 2K19, voicing the Nike representative. Since 2020, he has hosted a Twitch channel dedicated to gaming and pop culture. He also posts videos on his career and pop culture regularly on his YouTube channel.

== Early life ==
Thomas was born in Anchorage, Alaska, and lived in Germany until the age of four. His mother is a Moroccan Jew and his father is African-American. After his family settled in Southern California, he began acting in commercials at age six.

== Career ==
In 1998, Thomas's first television appearance was on an episode of Bill Cosby's Kids Say the Darndest Things.

He has since starred in such films as Friday After Next (2002), Holes (2003), Going to the Mat (2004), Walking Tall (2004), and Roll Bounce (2005).

Thomas starred in the 2003 Disney film Holes, adapted from Louis Sachar's book of the same name. Thomas had not read the book before he was cast as Zero. To adapt to the desert climate for filming Holes, Thomas was required to participate in physical conditioning training. He recalls, "We had to climb rope, dig holes, run, go hiking, do sit-ups and push-ups. The whole time we were thinking, why do we need this? Then we get to the desert and we understood. It was so hot, you could only be in a hole for 20 minutes at a time." Thomas sang on one of the movie soundtrack's songs, "Dig It", which originated on the six-hour round-trip bus rides that transported the actors to the set.

In 2005, Thomas became more involved in music via an association with fellow rapper/actor Bow Wow and his label LBW Entertainment. He was featured on Bow Wow's fifth studio album, The Price of Fame, as well as on numerous mixtapes. He made cameo appearances in Bow Wow's "Fresh Azimiz" and "Outta My System" music videos.

In 2006, Thomas guest-starred in "Poppin' Tags", an episode of CSI: Crime Scene Investigation; and in the season four episode of House, "Ugly" in 2007. He co-starred in the first episode of the television series Teachers, which was canceled after six episodes. He starred in movies such as Remember the Daze (2007) and Hurricane Season (2009). In 2010, Thomas starred in the action film Boogie Town.

Thomas started a Twitch channel in 2020. He plays games, hosts Disney trivia contests, cosplays as the character Powerline from A Goofy Movie, and interacts with followers.

Thomas has stated that Wesley Jonathan helped and mentored him in pursuing his acting career, having previously starred in City Guys, Baadasssss!, Roll Bounce, and Remember the Daze, describing him as a "good friend" and "someone who he looked up to."

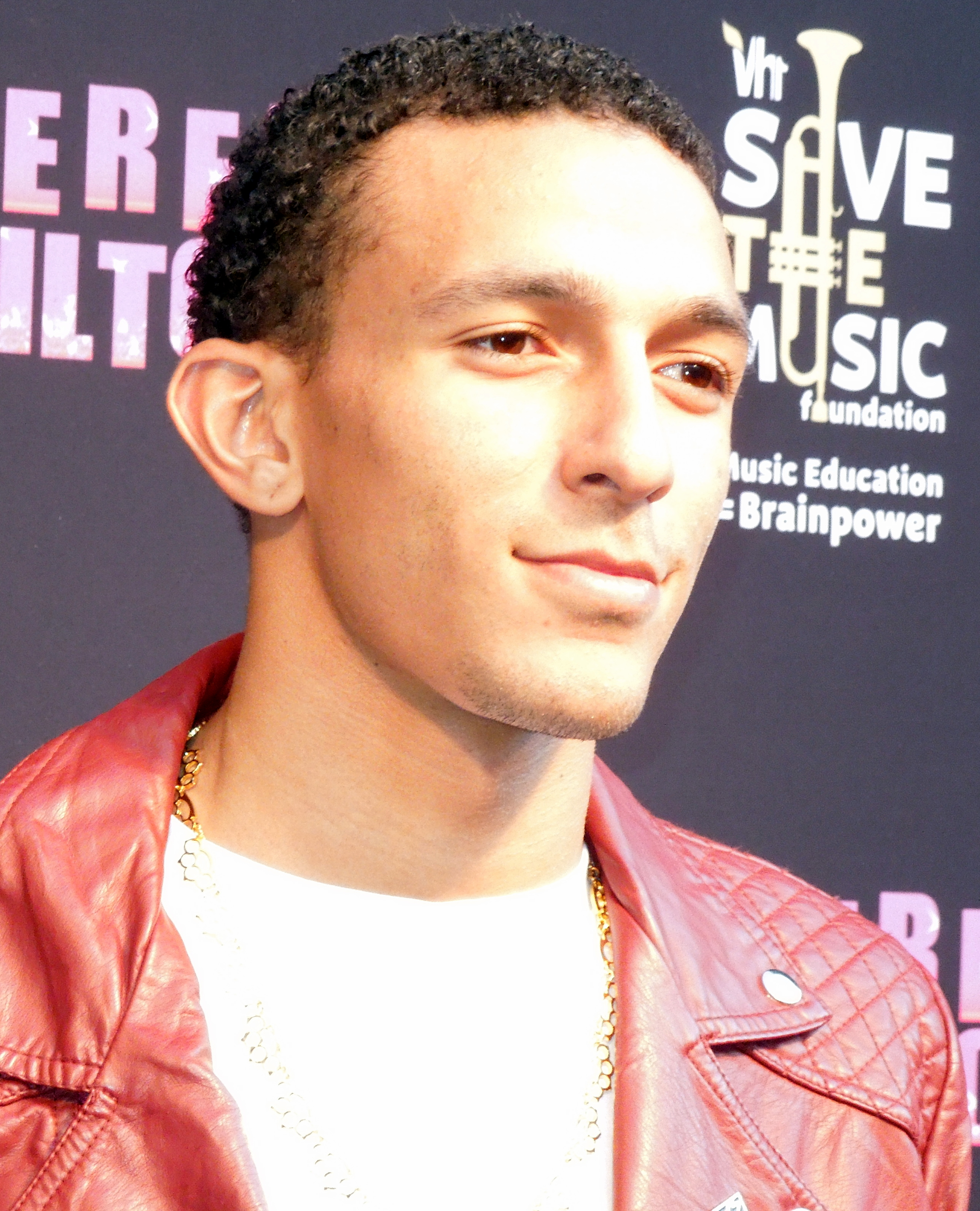
Khleo Thomas in September 2012 during Perez Hilton's One Night In... L.A.

== Filmography ==
Film
Year	Title	Role	Notes
2002	Friday After Next	Bad Kid	Supporting role
2003	Holes	Hector "Zero" Zeroni	Main role
2004	Baadasssss!	Mario	Supporting role
2004	Time Out	Khalid	Short film
2004	Going to the Mat	Vincent "Fly" Shu	Supporting role; television film
2004	Walking Tall	Pete Vaughn	Supporting role
2005	The Golden Blaze	Jason Fletcher/Sure Shot (voice)	
2005	Roll Bounce	Mixed Mike	Main role
2005	Dirty	Splooge	Supporting role
2007	Remember the Daze	Dylan	Supporting role
2009	Boogie Town	Gizmo	Supporting role; unreleased film
2009	Bob Funk	Cupcake	Main role
2009	Hurricane Season	David Willis	Supporting role
2009	Breathe	Dante	Short film
2010	Krews	Tom Tom	
2010	The Company We Keep	Young Raheem	Supporting role
2015	Victor	Randy	Supporting role
2016	Soy Nero	Mohammed	
2017	Clockwork	Beau Cartermore	Short film
2019	Anywhere with You	Danny	Supporting role
2019	Paint It Red	Eduardo	
2022	Scrap	Marcus	

Television
Year	Title	Role	Notes
1998	Kids Say the Darndest Things	Himself	Episode: "Oatmeal"
1999	Family Law	Lanny Brass	Episode: "Games"
2001	City Guys	Jordan	Episode: "Skips, Lies and Radiotapes"
2003	Super Short Show	Himself	
2004	ER	Brian	Episode: "Forgive and Forget"
2004	The Wayne Brady Show	Himself	Episode: "March 19, 2004"
2004	Frankie Muniz HoopLA Celebrity Basketball Event	Himself	
2004	The Story Behind Baadasssss!: The Birth of Black Cinema		
2005	The Bernie Mac Show	Curtis	Episode: "Car Wars"
2005	Scream Tour IV	Himself	
2006	Teachers	Patrick	Episode: "Substitute"
2006	CSI: Crime Scene Investigation	Dante	Episode: "Poppin' Tags"
2006	Gettin' Dirty		
2007	On Location with Remember the Daze	Himself	
2007	House	Kenny Arnold	Episode: "Ugly"
2009	Kids' Inaugural	Himself	
2010	90210	Purse Guy	Episode: "I see London/I see France"
2011	Parenthood	Guy in Cage	Episode: "Amazing Andy and His Wonderful World of Bugs"
2011	Sons of Anarchy	Frecks	Episode: "Dorylus"
2013	Bones	Marcos Herrera	Episode: "The Blood from the Stones"
2016	Shameless	Dylan Oswald	Episodes: "I Am a Storm", "Own Your Sh*t"
2017	Being Mary Jane	D-Razor	Episode: "Getting Schooled"
2017	Major Crimes	Lewis Wilks	2 episodes
2017	Relationship Status	Billy	2 episodes
2019	UA:LA	Veil	2 episodes
2021	5150	Vlogger	Television short film
2026	The Loud House	Thumbz (voice)	Episode: "The Most Dangerous Gamer"

Video games
Year	Title	Role	Notes
2018	NBA 2K19	Kai Donaldson/Nike Rep (voice)	

== Discography ==
=== EPs ===
Year	Title
2012	After Everything Fades (with Chris Batson): Release date: November 13, 2012; Label: Executive Dream, Executive Music, Fontana; Format: Digital download
2014	Raised in the 90s: Release date: December 28, 2014; Label: Slick Living, Executive Dream, Executive Music, Fontana; Format: Digital download

=== Mixtapes ===
Title	Mixtape details
The World Is A Cartoon	Released: January 11, 2010
The Next Episode	Released: January 11, 2011; Label: Zero Unlimited
Slick Living	Released: December 23, 2011; Hosted by Coast 2 Coast; Label: Slick Living

=== As lead artist ===
Year	Song	Album
2012	"So Many Girls"	Non-album single
2012	"Slick"	Slick Living
2012	"Sweat It Out"	Slick Living
2012	"Becoming" (with Chris Batson)	After Everything Fades
2013	"Ride" (with Chris Batson)	After Everything Fades
2014	"Side Ni**a / Don't Catch Feelings"	Non-album single
2014	"No Questions"	Non-album single
2014	"Tonight" (featuring Sean Roxs)	Non-album single

=== As featured artist ===
Year	Song	Album
2013	"Now Forever" (Sofia Reyes featuring Khleo Thomas)	Non-album single

=== Guest appearances ===
Year	Song	Performer(s)	Album
2006	"How You Move It"	Bow Wow	The Price of Fame
2006	"Bet That"	Bow Wow	Non-album single
2009	"Ain't I Freestyle"	Bow Wow	The Greenlight
2009	"Do I Love Her"	Bow Wow	The Greenlight
2010	"Freak Show"	JBar aka Ja-Bar	In the Club
2010	"Victory"	Soulja Boy	none
2010	"Never Change Remix (I'll Never Change)"	Indigo Charlie	none
2010	"Not My Girl"	The Good Boys	none
2010	"Light the Speakers on Fire"	Malachi Mott	none
2013	"Now Forever"	Sofia Reyes	none
2013	"Fade Away"	Social Club	Summer of George
2014	"In'n'Out"	Sean Roxs	none
2014	"Face Down"	Flip Major	none

== Videography ==
=== As lead artist ===
- "In My Soul" (2010)
- "I'm Still" (2010)
- "Lost" (2010)
- "I Got Me" (2010)
- "Feel Good Music" (2010)
- "Halloween" (2010)
- "Lights Out" (2011)
- "Floyd Mayweather" (2011)
- "Motivation Remix" (2011)
- "You Don't Fight Fair" (2011)
- "Monster & A Beat" (2011)
- "Slick" (2012)
- "Sweat It Out" (2012)
- "Fly Me Out To Cali" (2012)
- "So Many Girls" (2012)
- "Slick Music" (2012)
- "5 On It" (2014)

=== As featured artist ===
- Eric Mora - "Ain't I Freestyle" (2009)
- Indigo Charlie - "Never Change Remix (I'll Never Change)" (2010)

=== Cameo video appearances ===
- Bow Wow - "Fresh Azimiz" (2005)
- Bow Wow - "Outta My System" (2007)
- Bow Wow - "Pretty Lady" (2010)
- Soulja Boy - "All Black Everything" (2010)
- Soulja Boy - "Pretty Boy Swag" (2010)(Viral Version)
- Bow Wow - "For My Hood" (2010)
- Paula DeAnda - "Easy" (2010)
- Jonn Hart - "Who Booty" (2012)
- Chris Batson - "We Got Lost Along the Way" (2014)
