= Scrap (2022 American film) =

- Poster
- Directed by: Vivian Kerr
- Written by: Vivian Kerr
- Produced by: Vivian Kerr; Marion Kerr; Rachel Stander; Suresh Cedrick Pereira
- Starring: Vivian Kerr; Anthony Rapp; Lana Parrilla
- Cinematography: Markus Mentzer
- Edited by: Toby Yates
- Music by: Holly Tatnall
- Production companies: Rue Dangeau; A Season of Rain; Sergecedrick
- Distributed by: Rue Dangeau
- Release dates: September 5, 2022 (Deauville American Film Festival); December 13, 2024 (United States)
- Running time: 105 minutes
- Country: United States
- Language: English

Scrap is a 2022 American drama film written and directed by Vivian Kerr and starring Kerr, Anthony Rapp and Lana Parrilla.

== Plot ==
After getting laid off, young single-mom Beth finds herself living in her car and struggles to hide her homelessness from her estranged brother Ben.

== Cast ==
- Vivian Kerr as Beth
- Anthony Rapp as Ben
- Lana Parrilla as Stacy
- Beth Dover as Esther
- Khleo Thomas as Marcus
- Brad Schmidt as Joshua
- Julianna Layne as Birdy
- Stephanie Drake as Dakota
- Nicole Peplinski as Jules

== Release ==
The film premiered at the Deauville American Film Festival in France on September 5, 2022 and embarked on a two-year festival run. It was released digitally on December 13, 2024.

== Reception ==
On the review aggregator website Rotten Tomatoes, 98% of 44 critics' reviews are positive, with an average rating of 9.4/10. Nell Minow of RogerEbert.com awarded the film three and a half stars out of four. Alan Ng of Film Threat rated the film a 7.5 out of 10. Rachel Labonte of Screen Rant rated the film an 8 out of 10. Chris Jones of Overly Honest Reviews rated the film a 4 out of 5.

Dennis Harvey of Variety gave the film a positive review and wrote, "The well-acted, confidently crafted indie Scrap probes messy family dynamics with low-key but taut acuity, avoiding the usual poles of dysfunctional-clan comedy or high drama driven by yelling matches and shocking revelations."

== Accolades ==
Year	Award	Film Festival	Recipient	Result
2022	Grand Special Prize	Deauville American Film Festival	Vivian Kerr	Nominated
2023	Best Feature	Cinequest Film & Creativity Festival	Scrap	Nominated
2023	Special Achievement in Acting	Phoenix Film Festival	Vivian Kerr	Won
2023	Best Film	SOHO International Film Festival	Scrap	Nominated
2023	Excellence in Narrative Directing	SOHO International Film Festival	Vivian Kerr	Won
2023	Best Acting Performance in a Leading Role	SOHO International Film Festival	Anthony Rapp	Nominated
2023	Best Acting Performance in a Leading Role	SOHO International Film Festival	Vivian Kerr	Nominated
2023	Best First Feature	Port Townsend Film Festival	Vivian Kerr	Won
2023	Best Director	Golden Door International Film Festival	Vivian Kerr	Nominated
2023	Best Actor	Golden Door International Film Festival	Anthony Rapp	Nominated
2023	Best Actress	Golden Door International Film Festival	Vivian Kerr	Nominated
2023	Best Supporting Actor	Golden Door International Film Festival	Khleo Thomas	Nominated
2023	Best Supporting Actress	Golden Door International Film Festival	Laura Parrilla	Nominated
2023	Best Supporting Actress	Golden Door International Film Festival	Beth Dover	Nominated
2023	Best Cinematography	Golden Door International Film Festival	Markus Mentzer	Nominated
2023	Best Feature Director	LA Femme Film Festival	Vivian Kerr	Nominated
2023	Best Narrative Feature	Naples International Film Festival	Scrap	Won
2023	Best Narrative Feature	Coronado Island Film Festival	Scrap	Won
2023	Best Narrative Feature	Fayetteville Film Festival	Scrap	Won
2023	Best Director - Narrative Feature	Mystic Film Festival	Vivian Kerr	Won
2023	Best Actor - Narrative Feature	Mystic Film Festival	Anthony Rapp	Won
2023	Best Feature Film	We Make Movies International Film Festival	Scrap	Won
2023	Outstanding Director	Micheaux Film Festival	Vivian Kerr	Nominated
2023	Outstanding Actress	Micheaux Film Festival	Vivian Kerr	Won
2023	Outstanding Writing	Micheaux Film Festival	Vivian Kerr	Nominated
2023	Outstanding Cinematography	Micheaux Film Festival	Markus Mentzer	Won
2023	MINT Spirit Award	Montana International Film Festival	Vivian Kerr	Won
2024	Best Actress	Bare Bones International Film & Music Festival	Vivian Kerr	Nominated
2024	Indie Auteur of the Year	Bare Bones International Film & Music Festival	Vivian Kerr	Won
2024	Best Feature Film	Long Island International Film Expo	Scrap	Won
2024	Best Director - Feature Film	Long Island International Film Expo	Vivian Kerr	Nominated
2024	Best Actress	Long Island International Film Expo	Vivian Kerr	Won
2024	Best Narrative Feature Film	Fargo Film Festival	Scrap	Won
2024	Mela Hudson Award - Best Film	FirstGlance Film Fest Hollywood	Scrap	Nominated
2024	Best Actor (Feature)	FirstGlance Film Fest Hollywood	Anthony Rapp	Nominated
2024	Best Actress (Feature)	FirstGlance Film Fest Hollywood	Vivian Kerr	Won
2024	Best Director (Feature)	FirstGlance Film Fest Hollywood	Vivian Kerr	Won
2024	Best Breakout Performance	FirstGlance Film Fest Hollywood	Vivian Kerr	Nominated
2024	Best Young Actor	FirstGlance Film Fest Hollywood	Julianna Layne	Won
2024	Best Cinematography	FirstGlance Film Fest Hollywood	Markus Mentzer	Nominated
2024	Best Ensemble Cast (Feature)	FirstGlance Film Fest Hollywood	Cast of Scrap	Nominated
2024	Best Feature Film	Myrtle Beach International Film Festival	Scrap	Nominated
2024	Best Actress	Myrtle Beach International Film Festival	Vivian Kerr	Nominated
2024	Best Feature	Beaufort International Film Festival	Scrap	Nominated
2024	Best Director	Beaufort International Film Festival	Vivian Kerr	Nominated
2024	Best Actress	Beaufort International Film Festival	Vivian Kerr	Won
2024	Best Actor	Beaufort International Film Festival	Anthony Rapp	Nominated
2024	Best Music Score	Beaufort International Film Festival	Brooke Wentz	Nominated
2024	Best Feature Film	Hell's Half Mile Film & Music Festival	Scrap	Won
2024	Best Actress	Hell's Half Mile Film & Music Festival	Vivian Kerr	Won
2024	Best Feature Film	Waco Independent Film Festival	Scrap	Nominated
2024	Best Director - Feature	Waco Independent Film Festival	Vivian Kerr	Won
2024	Best Performance in a Feature Film	Waco Independent Film Festival	Vivian Kerr	Nominated
2024	Best Feature (Drama)	SModCastle Film Festival	Scrap	Won
2024	Best Actor in a Drama Feature	SModCastle Film Festival	Vivian Kerr	Nominated
2024	Best Ensemble	SModCastle Film Festival	Cast of Scrap	Nominated
2024	Best Feature Film	New Bedford Film Festival	Scrap	Nominated
2024	Best Director	New Bedford Film Festival	Vivian Kerr	Nominated
2024	Best Actress	New Bedford Film Festival	Vivian Kerr	Nominated
2024	Best Screenwriter - Feature Film	New Bedford Film Festival	Vivian Kerr	Nominated
2024	Best Actor	New Bedford Film Festival	Anthony Rapp	Nominated
2024	Best Supporting Actress - Feature Film	New Bedford Film Festival	Lana Parrilla	Nominated
2024	Best Youth Performer	New Bedford Film Festival	Julianna Layne	Nominated
2024	Best Original Score	New Bedford Film Festival	Holly Tatnall	Nominated
