= Going to the Mat =

- Promotional poster
- Written by: Chris Sean Nolan; Laurie Nolan; Steve Bloom; Stu Krieger
- Directed by: Stuart Gillard
- Starring: Andrew Lawrence; Khleo Thomas; Alessandra Toreson; Billy Aaron Brown; Brenda Strong; Brian Wimmer; D. B. Sweeney; Wayne Brady
- Theme music composer: Christopher Brady
- Country of origin: United States
- Original language: English

Production
- Producer: Don Schain
- Cinematography: Thomas Burstyn
- Editor: James R. Symons
- Running time: 96 minutes
- Production company: Chanticleer Films

Original release
- Network: Disney Channel
- Release: March 19, 2004

Going to the Mat is a 2004 American sports drama film released as a Disney Channel Original Movie. It was directed by Stuart Gillard. It stars Andrew Lawrence, Alessandra Torresani, Khleo Thomas, and Wayne Brady. The film debuted on Disney Channel on March 19, 2004.

== Plot ==
Jason "Jace" Newfield is the new blind student at his school, whose family recently moved from New York City to Salt Lake City. Thinking that his way to fit in is through playing the drums, he shows off in class only to find out that his band teacher, Mr. Wyatt, is also blind.

He later finds out from one of his friends, Vincent "Fly" Shu, that the only way to fit in is to be a jock. However, his other friend, Mary Beth Rice, is becoming increasingly irritated by his "New Yorkers rule" jokes and tells him that the reason no one is willing to be his friend is not because he is blind but because he is acting like a jerk. So in an effort to help Jace fit in, she asks him to try out for the wrestling team.

"Fly" unwillingly tries out for the team with Jace, and they both make it. Jace has trouble winning matches at first, but slowly starts improving after receiving lessons from Mary Beth, whose father is the coach of the wrestling team.

Throughout the course of the season he slowly starts to fit in with some of the students that gave him a hard time at the beginning of his year at the school. At the end of the season, they go on to the state championship. It ends with a reporter interviewing Jace's teammates about his wrestling; they deny that he is even blind, because they realize that he is a significant person, and they accept him for who he is and not just a blind person, which is what they saw at first.

== Cast ==
- Andrew Lawrence as Jason "Jace" Newfield
- Khleo Thomas as Vincent "Fly" Shu
- Alessandra Toreson as Mary Beth Rice
- Billy Aaron Brown as John Lambrix
- Brenda Strong as Patty Newfield, Jace's mother
- Brian Wimmer as Tom Newfield, Jace's father
- D. B. Sweeney as Coach Rice
- Wayne Brady as Mason Wyatt
- T.J. Lowther as Luke Nolan
- Marcus T. Paulk as Peter

== Reception ==
Going to the Mat received positive reviews, with praise for Andrew Lawrence’s performance in particular. Laura Fries of Variety wrote, "Although a bit heavy on the slo-mo sports sequence, Gillard otherwise nicely balances action with drama, touching on universal teen themes of alienation and the undo [sic] pressures of high school sports."

The film earned a nomination for a Directors Guild Award for Stuart Gillard and a Humanitas Award writing nomination for Stu Krieger and Chris and Laurie Nolan.
