= Olivia Wilde filmography =

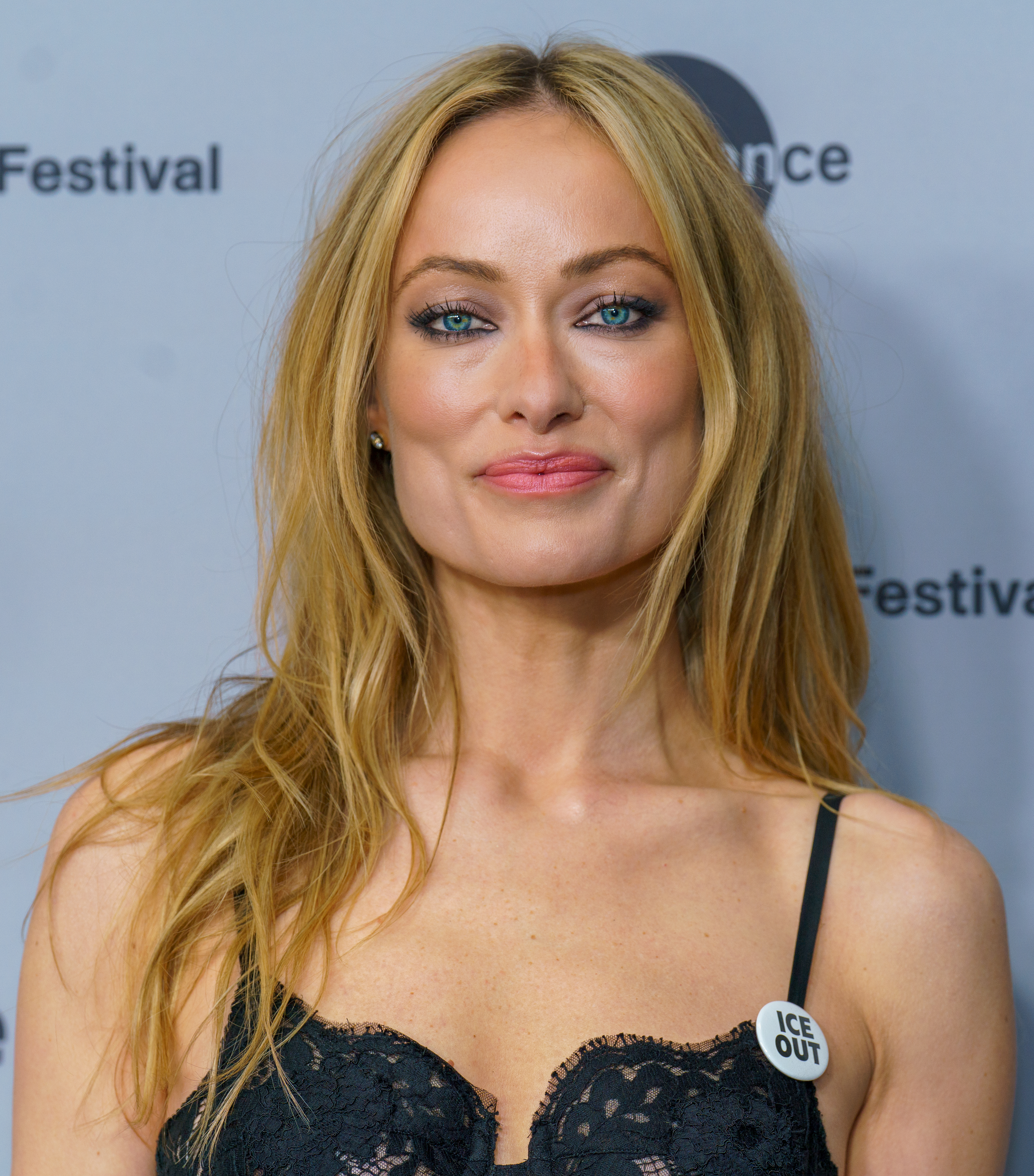
Wilde in 2026

Olivia Wilde is an American actress and filmmaker. She is known for her role as Remy "Thirteen" Hadley on the medical-drama television series House (2007–2012), and her roles in the films Conversations with Other Women (2005), Alpha Dog (2006), Tron: Legacy (2010), Cowboys & Aliens (2011), Butter (2011), Drinking Buddies (2013), The Incredible Burt Wonderstone (2013), Rush (2013), The Lazarus Effect (2015), Love the Coopers (2015), and Meadowland (2015). In 2017, Wilde made her Broadway debut, playing the role of Julia in 1984. In 2019, she directed her first film, the coming-of-age comedy Booksmart, to critical acclaim. She then went on to direct the films Don't Worry Darling (2022) and The Invite (2026).

== Film ==
Year	Title	Role	Notes
2004	The Girl Next Door	Kellie	
2005	Conversations with Other Women	Bridesmaid	
2006	Alpha Dog	Angela Holden	
2006	Bickford Shmeckler's Cool Ideas	Sarah Witt	
2006	Turistas	Bea	
2007	The Death and Life of Bobby Z	Elizabeth	
2008	Fix	Bella	
2009	Year One	Princess Inanna	
2009	The Ballad of G.I. Joe	Baroness	Short film
2010	Weird: The Al Yankovic Story	Madonna	Short film
2010	The Next Three Days	Nicole	
2010	Tron: Legacy	Quorra	
2011	Cowboys & Aliens	Ella Swenson	
2011	The Change-Up	Sabrina McKay	
2011	Butter	Brooke Swinkowski	
2011	In Time	Rachel Salas	
2011	Free Hugs	Head Hooper	Short film, also director and writer
2011	On the Inside	Mia Conlon	
2012	The Words	Daniella	
2012	Deadfall	Liza	
2012	People Like Us	Hannah	
2013	Drinking Buddies	Kate	Also executive producer
2013	The Incredible Burt Wonderstone	Jane	
2013	Rush	Suzy Miller	
2013	Third Person	Anna Barr	
2013	Her	Blind Date	
2014	Better Living Through Chemistry	Elizabeth Roberts	
2014	The Longest Week	Beatrice Fairbanks	
2015	The Lazarus Effect	Zoe McConnell	
2015	Meadowland	Sarah	Also executive producer
2015	Black Dog, Red Dog	Sunshine	
2015	Unity	Narrator	Documentary
2015	Love the Coopers	Eleanor Cooper	
2018	A Vigilante	Sadie	Also producer
2018	Life Itself	Abby Dempsey	
2019	Booksmart	—N/a	Director
2019	Richard Jewell	Kathy Scruggs	
2020	Wake Up	—N/a	Short film, director
2021	How It Ends	Alay	
2021	Ghostbusters: Afterlife	Gozer the Gozerian	Uncredited, role shared with Emma Portner and Shohreh Aghdashloo
2022	DC League of Super-Pets	Lois Lane	Voice role
2022	Don't Worry Darling	Bunny	Also director and producer
2022	Babylon	Ina Conrad	Cameo
2026	I Want Your Sex	Erika Tracy	
2026	The Invite	Angela	Also director
2026	Behemoth!	Carol Spedding	
2027	Naughty †	—N/a	Director, filming

== Television ==
Year	Title	Role	Notes
2003–2004	Skin	Jewel Goldman	6 episodes
2004–2005	The O.C.	Alex Kelly	13 episodes
2007	The Black Donnellys	Jenny Reilly	Main role
2007–2012	House	Remy "Thirteen" Hadley	Main (seasons 4–7), recurring (season 8)
2011	Saturday Night Live	Woman	Episode: "Jason Segel/Florence and the Machine"
2012	Half the Sky	Herself	Documentary
2012	Robot Chicken	Various voices	Episode: "Crushed by a Steamroller on My 53rd Birthday"
2012	Tron: Uprising	Quorra (voice)	Episode: "Isolated"
2013	The High Fructose Adventures of Annoying Orange	Rainbow Fairy (voice) / Fruit Bat (voice)	Episode: "Bat's All, Fruits"
2014	American Dad!	Denise (voice)	Episode: "Introducing the Naughty Stewardesses"
2014–2020	BoJack Horseman	Charlotte (voice)	6 episodes
2014–2015	Portlandia	Brit	3 episodes
2015	Doll & Em	Olivia	5 episodes
2016	Vinyl	Devon Finestra	Main role
2017	Son of Zorn	Radiana (voice)	Episode: "Radioactive Ex-Girlfriend"
2025	The Studio	Herself	Episode: "The Missing Reel"

== Theatre ==
Year	Title	Role	Venue	Notes
2007	Beauty On The Vine	Lauren Chickering	Theatre Row	
2017	1984	Julia	Hudson Theatre	Broadway debut

== Music videos ==
Year	Title	Artist	Notes
2006	"So Far We Are"	French Kicks	
2007	"Stolen"	Dashboard Confessional	
2010	"Derezzed"	Daft Punk	
2013	"City of Angels"	Thirty Seconds to Mars	
2016	"No Love Like Yours"	Edward Sharpe and the Magnetic Zeros	Director
2016	"Dark Necessities"	Red Hot Chili Peppers	Director
2018	"Nice for What"	Drake	

== Video games ==
Year	Title	Voice role
2010	Tron: Evolution	Quorra
2010	Tron Evolution: Battle Grids	Quorra

== Podcast series ==
Year	Title	Role	Notes
2023	Ad Lucem	Miranda (voice)	9 episodes

== Commercials ==
Year	Title	Subject	Notes
2023	"'Tache"	Amazon Prime	Director
