= Thirteen (House) =

Fictional character

Remy Beauregard Hadley (Thirteen)
- House character
- First appearance: "The Right Stuff" (4.02)
- Last appearance: "Everybody Dies" (8.22)
- Portrayed by: Olivia Wilde

In-universe information
- Nickname: Thirteen
- Gender: Female
- Occupation: Physician: Department of Diagnostic Medicine Fellow (seasons 4–8)
- Family: Anne Hadley (mother, deceased); John Hadley (father); Kevin Hadley (brother, deceased)

Remy "Thirteen" Hadley, M.D., is a fictional character on the medical drama House, portrayed by Olivia Wilde. She is part of the new diagnostic team assembled by Dr. Gregory House after the disbanding of his previous team in the third-season finale. The character's nickname derives from the episode "The Right Stuff", when she is assigned the number during a competition for her position at the Princeton-Plainsboro Teaching Hospital.

The show depicts Thirteen as a secretive character who does not divulge personal information; her surname was not used on the show until the fourth season's penultimate episode "House's Head", nor her given name until the fifth-season episode "Emancipation". Instead, several of the character's traits are implied before they are depicted as true. In the season four episode "You Don't Want to Know", Thirteen tells House that her mother died from Huntington's disease; a test she performs several episodes later confirms she carries the gene. After hints were given regarding her character's sexuality, Wilde confirmed that her character is indeed bisexual. This is confirmed by Eric Foreman in the episode "Don't Ever Change".

== Characterization ==
Thirteen is reluctant to reveal information about herself and is extremely secretive. During House's new team member selection process in the fourth season, she simply lets her fellow applicants refer to her as "Thirteen" rather than her real name, and constantly deflects curious prodding from both House and Amber Volakis about her personal life and past. Amber admits to feeling threatened by how Thirteen's unusually secretive nature is fascinating to the prying House, who in season seven tells Thirteen she has the best "game face" he has ever seen. Thirteen spends the episode "Lockdown" engaged in a game of truth or dare with James Wilson, but at the end it is implied that everything she has said has been a lie.

Although his meddling with her personal affairs and insatiable curiosity frustrates Thirteen, House comes to respect her as a talented doctor and the two build a relationship of mutual trust and understanding of each other's personalities with occasional shared cynicism or sarcasm. Wilson later states that House is better with her on his team, saying "He needs someone who doesn't need him. You're the only one he's never really been able to suck into his crazy House vortex. Keeps him grounded, his ego in check."

Both Thirteen and House are equally critical and understanding of each other's self-pity and fatalism in the face of miserable circumstances. Although she believes in the importance of hope, Thirteen says in "Changes" that she believes that people are intrinsically happy or miserable, and that this cannot be changed. House states that this is her defense mechanism, because if she can convince herself that she would have been miserable either way, she does not need to resent the fact that her life is full of misfortune rather than fortune. Thirteen retorts that House's life is similarly miserable and that "lotteries are stupid".

=== Huntington's ===
Thirteen has a fifty-percent chance of having inherited Huntington's disease from her mother, but she initially refuses to be tested for it because not knowing allows her to live with hope. In the fourth-season finale, Thirteen takes the test and is diagnosed as having the mutated Huntington gene. Shortly after this, she begins to display reckless behavior, having casual sex with random women, using drugs, partying late and showing up at the clinic with a hangover.

In "Lucky Thirteen", Thirteen says that her Huntington's is more aggressive, greatly decreasing her life expectancy and hastening the onset of symptoms. Initially after being diagnosed, she exhibits sensation seeking: staying out all night, using recreational drugs and having repeated one-night stands with women. She later ceases to behave self-destructively after a near-death experience in the episode "Last Resort", wherein she realizes her conviction to live, agreeing to participate in a Huntington's disease drug trial and becoming more active in her attempts to prolong her life.

Her behavior brings her colleagues to consider her someone who avoids or ignores her own personal problems and pretends that nothing is wrong. She is also shown to hide deep-seated fear; in the episode "Mirror Mirror", a patient who mimics the personality of whomever he is talking to tells her that he is scared – when she assures him that it will be okay, he fearfully tells her that it won't be.

When Thirteen briefly returns to consult on a case, House subsequently fires her permanently so that she can focus on being happy with her girlfriend in whatever time she has left rather than worry about work.

=== Sexuality ===
In the episode "Don't Ever Change", Thirteen's contempt at the idea of being categorized or oversimplified leads to both House and Foreman to assume that she is bisexual, although she is surprised and does not respond to either of their comments. Her sexuality, often the butt of House's jokes and sexual innuendos, remains unclear until the episode "Lucky Thirteen". She becomes more open and blatant about her sexuality as the series progresses and her relationship with her colleagues grows, going as far to propose the idea that she might drunkenly make out with a stripper in order to gain an invite to Chase's bachelor party.

In her game of truth or dare with Wilson, she initially states that her father is supportive of her sexuality, although she later corrects this, saying he is in fact unaware and she never came out to him. She also tells Wilson that she has never been in a threesome. Wilson seems astonished, given Thirteen's promiscuity, and former thrill-seeking behavior. She later states that she may have participated in a foursome, thereby allowing her to truthfully answer "no" to the question about a threesome. However, at the end of the game, it is implied that nothing she had told him has been truthful, leaving her status with her father a mystery.

== Character history ==
In "Lockdown", Thirteen says she went to Newton North High School. In "Epic Fail", Thirteen reveals she attended Sarah Lawrence College. The episode "Let Them Eat Cake" shows that as a child she resented her mother, who was dying from Huntington's, and she tells Chase that she knew her father was having an affair; other than this, very little is shown about her past. She appears to be very street-smart; she can easily identify a drug dealer and is also able to differentiate between high-purity and low-purity cocaine by the strength of the numbing effect on her gums, as well as identify typical street-level drug-dealer tactics employed to ensure repeat customers.

At the end of the fellowship competition, Lisa Cuddy tells House that, since he already has Eric Foreman on his team, he may only hire two additional people, so House fires Thirteen and Amber, claiming fellow applicants Chris Taub and Lawrence Kutner outperformed her, and that if he could keep Thirteen, he would. Cuddy overrules House's decision, forcing him to accept a woman, realizing only a minute later that this had been House's plan from the start.

Several episodes later, Foreman and Thirteen embark on a relationship, which affects Foreman's professional judgment to the extent that he fixes the drug trial, which causes serious side effects in Thirteen. Foreman almost loses his medical license, resulting in House ordering the couple to either break up or quit. The couple fake a split and continue their relationship in secret, but come public after House discovers they are still seeing each other. Initial relationship strains develop during the episode "Simple Explanation (5.20)" when Foreman tells Thirteen he needs time to himself to grieve and process Kutner's suicide. The conflict is resolved during the funeral when Foreman reaches out for Thirteen's hand, and Thirteen, surprised by the gesture, accepts.

When Foreman takes House's position in the sixth season, Thirteen's relationship with Foreman becomes strained due to their difficulties balancing their romantic relationship and their new employer-employee status at work. Foreman fires Thirteen in "Epic Fail" in an attempt to save their relationship, which fails. Thirteen initially breaks up with Foreman but later decides to try to work things out by agreeing to dinner with him; when, at dinner, she asks if he would have ever considered stepping down from the head of the diagnostics department rather than sacrifice either her career or their relationship. When Foreman replies no, she leaves him for good.

In the sixth-season episode "Instant Karma", Thirteen attempts to book a one-way flight to Bangkok, Thailand, citing a need for a vacation. However, the tickets are mysteriously canceled, and Thirteen confronts House, Cuddy and Wilson to find out who did it. Wilson confesses to hacking Thirteen's e-mail account, but it is later shown that it was really House. House is evasive about whether he did it for his own benefit, Foreman's or Thirteen's, but Wilson surmises that it is simply because he likes having her around and he needs her. Thirteen is seen eventually boarding a plane. In the episode "Teamwork", Thirteen has returned from Thailand and House manages to convince her to return to his team along with Chase, Taub, and Foreman.

During the season-six finale, "Help Me", Thirteen shows up late at a differential, obviously hiding something. She leaves a letter on House's desk asking for leave, citing personal reasons; when Taub asks her if everything is okay, she replies "obviously not". In the season-seven premiere "Now What", Foreman reads her letter and goes through her locker, finding flight tickets as well as information on an experimental treatment for Huntington's in Rome. With her teammates believing she will be leaving for Rome the following day, Thirteen affirms her friendship with Foreman and Taub tells her he approves of her seeking any chance of getting better. Chase offers her a sexual proposition (in the same way he once did Cameron), but she turns him down and surprises him with a long embrace. The team organize to meet up and have cake to send her off, but Thirteen disappears without saying goodbye. Foreman then discovers that the clues about Rome were purposely planted by Thirteen as a red herring. The team later find that all her phone lines have been disconnected and her apartment has been vacated.

Following this, Thirteen remains missing for a year without anyone knowing of her whereabouts. Her vacancy in the team is eventually filled by Martha Masters.

Thirteen returns in the show's 150th episode, "The Dig", where House meets her upon release from a prison where she has been incarcerated for the last six months for over-prescribing drugs. She has House drive her to a seemingly random house where she rings the bell, then assaults the man who answers the door. The two then spend a few days on the road preparing for a spud-shooting contest while House tries to figure out the real reason Thirteen was in prison, eventually deducing that Thirteen helped kill her brother, who was suffering from advanced stages of Huntington's. Thirteen eventually admits to House that she did what she had to when her brother's time had come, and that now she is alone and will have nobody there for her when her time comes. House later tells her that he is willing to euthanise her when she needs him to and rehires her onto his team.

The rest of the team are excited to see Thirteen again and are curious about where she has been; to her chagrin, House tells the team that she has been in rehab for a substance abuse problem. She later tells Masters, "the real reason I was gone is not something I want to share." Upon her return to work, House notices a change in her personality, as she has become more cynical and fatalistic, appearing resigned to misery. House eventually concludes that if Thirteen can convince herself that she is naturally miserable as a person, then she does not have to hate the universe for making her miserable. Thirteen then turns around, pointing out that House's life is also miserable, and that "We are who we are. Lotteries are stupid."

In "After Hours", a then-unknown woman arrives at Thirteen's apartment with a serious wound in her abdomen. She is revealed to be a cellmate of Thirteen's from prison and makes Thirteen promise that Thirteen will not take her to a hospital, as she will be arrested and taken back to prison. Thirteen phones Chase requesting help on false pretenses, bartering on their relationship to convince him to bring medical supplies without explanation. Chase convinces her to let him help, and she admits to him that she was in prison for killing her brother. After it becomes clear the woman will die without a hospital, Chase engages in a physical confrontation with Thirteen to get the patient to the hospital. He also deduces that her conviction to always keep promises is so that she can blame her brother's death on her promise to him, rather than blame herself. After the two drive the woman to the hospital, she awakes alive but in custody. Thirteen apologizes, but her friend lashes out, claiming she only used Thirteen because she needed someone to talk to in prison. Thirteen later confides in Chase that his theory is right, and that she is afraid she will be consumed by guilt.

In "Charity Case", Thirteen is called in once more by House to help solve a case. She then decides to join the team once more. In the end, House sees that Thirteen was happy with her girlfriend and fires her once and for all so she can live out her last days being happy. She makes her final appearance as one of the speakers at House's funeral (House faked his death, only ever telling Wilson, who is in the final months of his own terminal illness) in the series finale "Everybody Dies".

== Concept and creation ==
"'Thirteen' is hidden, and hasn't yet revealed very much about herself. She doesn't really want to look into the future, and House finds that enormously compelling."

— Executive Producer Katie Jacobs.

Along with fellow actors Peter Jacobson (Taub), Kal Penn (Kutner), and Anne Dudek (Amber Volakis), Wilde did not know which character would be cut until the actors were given the scripts. Producers watched to see how the actors developed their characters and interacted. Wilde thought this technique improved the acting during the "Games" story arc. However, the story arc inspired a spirit of camaraderie between the actors instead of competition, due to the high-profile roles. While Thirteen's name was originally intended to be revealed during the story arc, the production team decided against doing so. Thirteen's actual name was replaced on all documents, including the call sheets, with the word "Thirteen" to further the in-joke in the show's narrative. Wilde describes her character as a "big bowl of secrets" in stark comparison to her own openness.

Thirteen's sexuality was initially written ambiguously: Foreman and House suggested she is bisexual. In response to the ambiguity, Wilde confirmed in July 2008 that her character is bisexual, the second time she has played a bisexual character (the first being on The O.C. as Alex Kelly). Thirteen has been compared often with Allison Cameron, the previous female diagnostician. Wilde described Thirteen as "almost the opposite" of Cameron, who is "compassionate and emotional", and attributed the comparisons to the similarity in the tasks that House delegates to both characters, and that "with two girls on a show, people are always going to compare them. Thirteen resists handing her trust to people, and has proven herself to be a rather difficult person."

=== "Thirteen" ===
The name "Thirteen" comes from the character's introduction: while searching for new team members House assigned all the applicants numbers rather than memorise all their names and persistently used it in reference to her. She did not correct him or offer her real name when prompted by fellow applicants or by House (simply telling House, "Thirteen is fine"), and the nickname stuck.

Although the producers gave the character a full name, and told Wilde what it was, they chose to keep it a secret from the viewers as part of the ongoing relationship between the character and House. Before the character's name was revealed, none of the actors, apart from Wilde herself, knew it. In episode 15 of season four ("House's Head"), Cuddy refers to her as "Dr. Hadley". This is the first mention of her actual name. In episode 8 of season five ("Emancipation"), she reveals she is called Remy. In later season five episodes, the character is occasionally referred to as "Dr. Hadley" although she is still predominantly called "Thirteen" by her colleagues.

In an interview with The Star-Ledger, producer David Shore commented that he would not be using Thirteen's real name too often, because "she will always be Thirteen". In the Season 6 episode "The Down Low", a fake pay stub shows Thirteen's middle name to be "Beauregard", though it is uncertain if that is actually her middle name.

== Reception ==
This character was considered a bisexual icon around the time it aired.

== Actor ==
Olivia Wilde left the show on October 13, 2011, in order to act in other television shows and films.

== See also ==
- Olivia Wilde filmography
