= Lawrence Kutner (House) =

- House character
- First appearance: "The Right Stuff"
- Last appearance: "Everybody Dies" (Note: In their guest appearance, as one of House's hallucinations; this character is written off in the fifth season episode, Simple Explanation (2009) due to the character's suicide as depicted in said episode.)
- Portrayed by: Kal Penn

In-universe information
- Gender: Male
- Occupation: Physician; Department of Diagnostic Medicine Fellow (seasons 4–5)
- Birth name: Lawrence Choudhary

Lawrence Kutner (born Lawrence Choudhary), M.D. is a fictional character on the medical drama House. He is played by Kal Penn. He becomes a member of House's new diagnostic team in "Games", the ninth episode of the fourth season. He commits suicide in season 5, episode 20, "Simple Explanation"; he makes a further appearance as a hallucination at the end of season five and season eight.

== Characterization ==
Kutner is shown to be open-minded about any new experience which is the reason he wants to join House's new team. He is originally #6 during the games, but is fired in his first appearance for reporting Amber Volakis's recording of patient information. He continues to work even after being "fired" by House by flipping his #6 into a #9 and refusing to leave, and then coming up with a clever stress test for a patient's liver, using alcohol to intoxicate the patient, which impresses House enough to keep him on, much to Amber's dismay.

Of all the new fellows, Kutner is the most enthusiastic and the one most likely to go along with House in taking risks, including illegal activities. When House is finally forced to pick his new team, Dr. Cuddy suggests he hire Kutner because Kutner "shares [House's] philosophy of medicine." He first gets approval from House after successfully reviving a patient with a defibrillator while in a hyperbaric chamber, despite also setting her clothing on fire due to the high-oxygen atmosphere. Similarly, in "Mirror Mirror", he resuscitates a patient using a defibrillator while the patient's skin is wet, inadvertently shocking himself into unconsciousness at the same time. Defibrillators and Kutner become a running joke for House, who, in "Ugly", appoints him the "professional defibrillist", a title of which Kutner seems rather proud.

Kutner is a science fiction fan and seems to be easily distracted by pretty women, having asked out Amber Volakis at the end of the contest. However, at the end of "Wilson's Heart", while other characters are shown to be visibly upset over Amber's death, he spends the night after her death eating cornflakes while watching television. He tends to share a great deal of trivial personal details with others (Taub mentions in "Let Them Eat Cake" that he had informed the team of his subscription renewal to National Geographic).

== Early life ==
Kutner was born in Fremont, California to Karamchand and Niki Baidwan. He reveals that his biological parents ran a small store and he used to help them as a young child. They were killed in an incidence of armed robbery in their store. He further claims that he accepted their deaths after a period of agony, and therefore he is not overly anxious about death. It is not confirmed in the show whether his revelation about his parents and their death is true or if it is a lie he told others. He became a foster child for several years, where Julia and Richard Kutner adopted him.

== Education ==
Kutner received a scholarship from the University of California, Berkeley, and graduated with a degree in Physics. He later joined Sackler Faculty of Medicine, and then the University of Colorado.

== Death ==
Kutner is found dead of a self-inflicted gunshot wound in his apartment by Thirteen and Foreman in "Simple Explanation". House's inability to diagnose Kutner's depression causes House to suspect foul play. The show's producers confirmed that his death was indeed a suicide.

In "Both Sides Now", Kutner appears briefly in one of House's hallucinations, along with Amber Volakis (who had previously died in "Wilson's Heart"). In "Everybody Dies", the series' final episode, Kutner once again appears in House's hallucinations.

== Production ==
Actor Kal Penn had accepted a job at the White House as "a liaison connecting the Obama administration with arts and entertainment groups, as well as with the Asian American and Pacific Islander communities". This required that Kutner be written out of the show.

David Shore, producer of the show, stressed the importance of the unknown reasons behind Kutner's suicide. He successfully intended it to become a mystery, due to his personality.

== Reception ==
Kutner's death was criticized in The Star-Ledger, with columnist Alan Sepinwall arguing that the death was pointless, and seemingly written only to create a "Very Special Episode", and/or to write Kutner out of the series so that Kal Penn could accept a job as the Principal Associate Director in the White House Office of Public Engagement. However, Entertainment Weekly commended the show's handling of the death, believing that it was presented in a dramatically effective and realistic manner.
