= Anne Dudek =

American actress (born 1975)

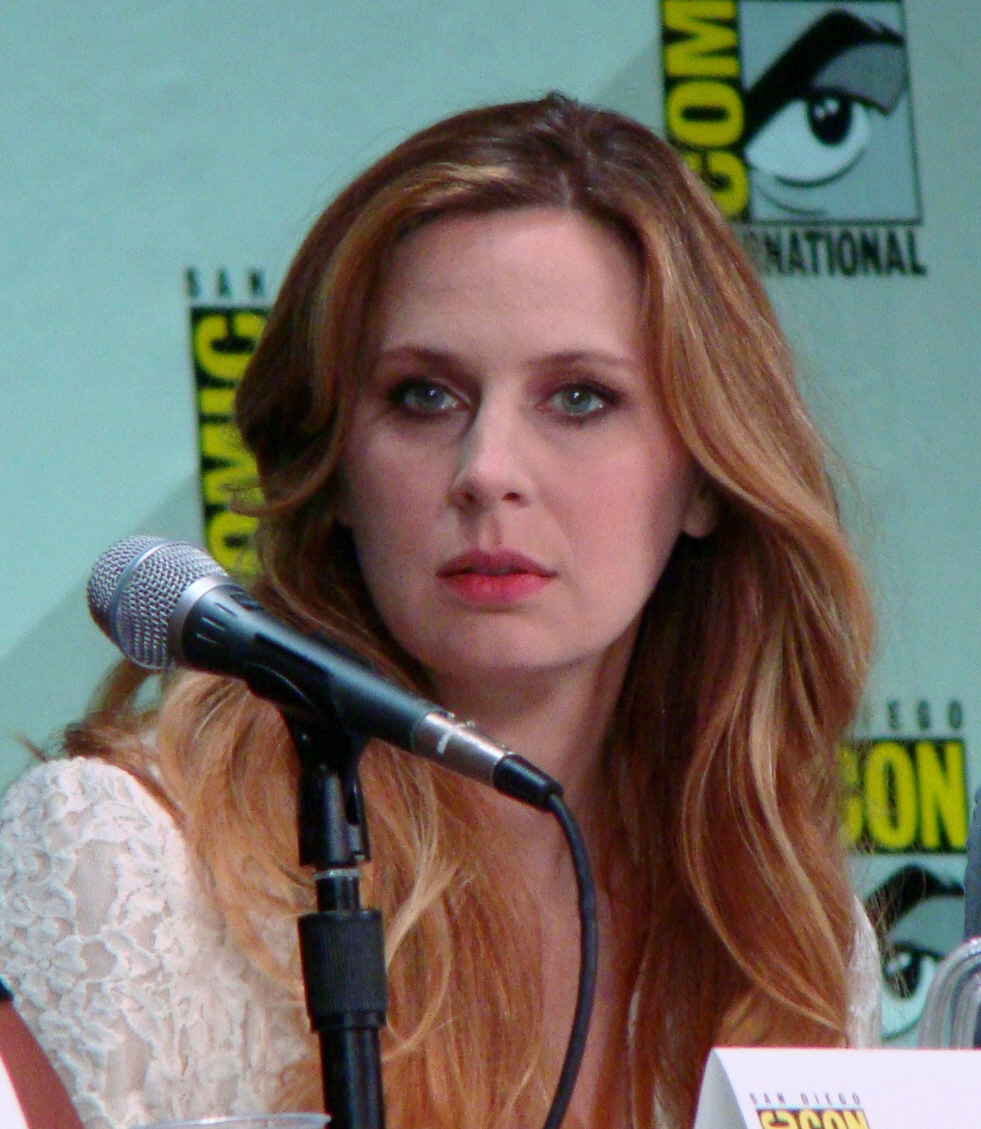
- Dudek at the 2011 San Diego Comic-Con
- Born: Anne Louise Dudek; March 22, 1975 (age 51); Boston, Massachusetts, U.S.
- Education: Northwestern University
- Occupation: Actress
- Years active: 2000–present
- Spouse: Matthew Dana Heller (m. 2008; div. 2016)
- Children: 2

Anne Louise Dudek (born March 22, 1975) is an American actress. She is best known for portraying Tiffany Wilson in the 2004 film White Chicks, Danielle Brooks in the television series Covert Affairs, Dr. Amber Volakis on the series House, Lura Grant on the series Big Love, and Francine Hanson on the series Mad Men. She has also starred in the British television series The Book Group.

== Early life ==
Dudek was born in Boston, Massachusetts, and grew up in Newton, Massachusetts. Her father was an architect. She graduated from Newton North High School and attended Northwestern University.

== Career ==
From the mid-1990s (while at Northwestern University) through 2001, Dudek appeared in various theater productions and on Broadway. She made her Broadway debut in Wrong Mountain in 2000. She won the Connecticut Critics Circle Award for outstanding performance in The Glass Menagerie.

After success on Broadway, she made the jump to television. Her first starring role on television came when she was cast as the lead in the British comedy drama The Book Group. The show aired on Channel 4 in the United Kingdom to rave reviews. In her native United States, Dudek has since guest starred on other TV shows, including Desperate Housewives (as Karl Mayer's girlfriend in Season 1), How I Met Your Mother (as 'Natalie', Ted's Krav Maga–trained ex-girlfriend), Friends (as 'Precious', Mike Hannigan's girlfriend), ER (as a mother who accidentally shot her son), Charmed, Bones (as Seeley Booth's lawyer girlfriend), Numb3rs, and Six Feet Under. She also played Lucinda Barry in the pilot episode of Psych, and a teacher who has a sexual relationship with one of her students (based on the case of Debra Lafave) on Law & Order: Criminal Intent. In both Friends and How I Met Your Mother, her character was dumped on her birthday. Dudek appeared in several episodes of the HBO series Big Love as a child bride.

Dudek had a role on House (recurring from season 4 onwards) as Amber Volakis, one of 40 physicians under consideration by Dr. House for permanent positions on his team. Her character, nicknamed "Cutthroat Bitch" by House, continued to the end of season 4 but was killed off in the two-part season finale, "House's Head" and "Wilson's Heart". She would later reappear as a hallucination by House in the season 5 episode "Saviors", appearing in this form for the remainder of the season.

Dudek later appeared in Mad Men as next-door neighbor Francine Hanson, and on Big Love as one of antagonist Alby Grant's wives, both recurring roles. In 2010, she joined the cast of Covert Affairs. She played Anthony Hopkins' character's daughter in the 2003 film The Human Stain, and cruise line heir Tiffany Wilson in the 2004 comedy film White Chicks. In 2012, she played an ISS astronaut in one episode of the TV show Touch. She also reprised her role as Amber Volakis for the House series finale "Everybody Dies".

In 2015, Dudek played villainess Dawn Lin in an episode of NCIS: New Orleans, and also made a guest appearance in the fifth-season finale of Rizzoli & Isles. In 2017, she recurred on The Flash as Tracy Brand.

== Personal life ==
Dudek married artist Matthew Dana Heller in 2008. They have a son, who was born in December 2008, and a daughter, who was born in February 2012. The couple divorced in 2016.

== Filmography ==
=== Film ===
Year	Title	Role	Notes
2003	The Human Stain	Lisa Silk	
2004	White Chicks	Tiffany Wilson	
2004	The Naughty Lady	Sara	Short film
2005	A Coat of Snow	Anna Marie	
2006	Park	Meredith	
2006	10 Items or Less	Lorraine	
2006	And Then It Breaks	Girlfriend	
2007	Speed Dating	Amy	Short film
2013	Shadow People	Ellen	
2016	Middle Man	Grail	
2016	The Good Neighbor	Elise Fleming	
2017	House by the Lake	Karen	
2025	Reminisce	Yvette	

=== Television ===
Year	Title	Role	Notes
2001	ER	Paula Gamble	Episode: "I'll Be Home for Christmas"
2002–2003	The Book Group	Clare Pettengill	Main cast
2002	For the People	Jennifer Carter	Recurring role
2003	Judging Amy	Candace Hurley	Episode: "Marry, Marry Quite Contrary"
2003	Six Feet Under	Allison Williman	Episode: "Twilight"
2003	Friends	Precious	Episode: "The One After Joey and Rachel Kiss"
2004	Desperate Housewives	Brandi	Episode: "Pretty Little Picture"
2004	Less than Perfect	Annie	2 episodes
2005	Charmed	Denise	Episode: "Ordinary Witches"
2005	Invasion	Katie Paxton	2 episodes
2005	Bones	Tessa Jankow	2 episodes
2005–2010	How I Met Your Mother	Natalie	2 episodes
2006	Psych	Lucinda Barry	Episode: "Pilot"
2006	Law & Order: Criminal Intent	Danielle McCaskin	Episode: "Tru Love"
2006–2007	Big Day	Brittany	3 episodes
2007	Numbers	Emmanueline Kirtland	Episode: "Nine Wives"
2007–2010, 2014	Mad Men	Francine Hanson	Recurring role (seasons 1–3); guest role, 2 episodes
2007–2011	Big Love	Lura Grant	Recurring role (seasons 2–5)
2007–2009, 2012	House	Dr. Amber Volakis	Recurring role (seasons 4–5), series finale: "Everybody Dies"
2009	Castle	Emma Carnes	Episode: "The Fifth Bullet"
2010–2012	Covert Affairs	Danielle Brooks	Main cast (seasons 1–2), recurring role (season 3)
2012	Touch	Allegra	Episode: "Zone of Exclusion"
2012	Private Practice	Lori	Episode: "Drifting Back"
2012	Criminal Minds	Emma Kerrigan	Episode: "The Good Earth"
2012	The Mentalist	Sloan Dietz	Episode: "Cherry Picked"
2013	Masters of Sex	Rosalie	Episode: "Fallout"
2013	Santa Switch	Linda Ryebeck	TV movie
2014	Those Who Kill	Benedicte Schaeffer	Recurring role
2014	Grimm	Vera Gates	Episode: "Once We Were Gods"
2014	Grey's Anatomy	Elise Castor	Episode: "Do You Know?"
2015	NCIS: New Orleans	Dawn Lin	Episode: "The Walking Dead"
2015	Rizzoli & Isles	Cynthia Wallace	Episode: "Family Matters"
2016–2017	The Magicians	Pearl Sunderland	Recurring role (seasons 1–2)
2016	The Mindy Project	Eden	Episode: "The Greatest Date in the World"
2016	Aquarius		Episode: "Everybody's Got Something to Hide Except Me and My Monkey"
2016	Longmire	Melissa Parr	Episode: "Chrysalis"
2017	The Flash	Tracy Brand	4 episodes
2017	You're the Worst	Whitney	3 episodes
2018–2020	Corporate	Kate Glass	Main cast
2018	Bosch	Pamela Duncan	4 episodes
2019	The InBetween	Hannah Foreman	2 episodes
2019	Deadly Influencer	Jessica Lakes' Mom	TV movie
2023	The Good Doctor	Olivia	Episode: "Quiet and Loud"
2024	Manhunt	Ellen Stanton	Miniseries, 2 episodes
