= List of House episodes =

House, also known as House, M.D., is an American medical drama series created by David Shore. Created in 2004, the show ran for eight seasons on Fox. The show follows Gregory House (Hugh Laurie), a maverick medical genius who heads a team of diagnosticians at the fictional Princeton-Plainsboro Teaching Hospital (PPTH) in New Jersey. In a typical episode, the team is presented with an unusual case; the storyline follows the diagnosis of the patient's illness, a process often complicated by the internal competition and personal foibles of the diagnostic team. The team leader, House, frequently clashes with his boss Dr. Lisa Cuddy (Lisa Edelstein) in seasons 1 to 7, and Dr. Eric Foreman in season 8, and his only friend, Dr. James Wilson (Robert Sean Leonard).

In seasons 1 to 3, House's diagnostic team includes Dr. Allison Cameron (Jennifer Morrison), Dr. Robert Chase (Jesse Spencer) and Dr. Eric Foreman (Omar Epps). This team leaves the show in the third season finale "Human Error". The show achieved its highest ranking with the episode "Human Error"; this episode placed the series in first position for the week it aired. Each season introduces a recurring guest star, who appears in a multi-episode story arc. The fourth season was the only exception to this pattern. It introduced seven new characters who compete for the coveted positions on House's team, replacing Cameron, Chase and Foreman. House eventually selects Dr. Chris Taub (Peter Jacobson), Dr. Lawrence Kutner (Kal Penn) and Dr. Remy "Thirteen" Hadley (Olivia Wilde) as his new team; Foreman rejoins soon after. Following Kutner's death in season five, through a series of plot twists, House reacquires Chase, one of the original team members. When House resigns early in season six, Foreman takes his place, but he soon fires Thirteen, and Taub quits because he was there only to work with House. After this, Foreman hires both Cameron and Chase, but, soon, House comes back, spurring the return of Thirteen and Taub, too. When the dictator ("The Tyrant") dies because of Chase's intentional misunderstanding, Cameron and even Chase decide to leave the PPTH. But, Chase's desire to be part of House's team makes Cameron quit (though she later returns for the episode "Lockdown"). At the beginning of season seven, Thirteen ostensibly goes away to Rome (it's later revealed that this was actually a lie), leaving a vacancy on House's team. House proposes then, giving a chance to the rest of his team, to hire a new member. After some unsuccessful tries, Cuddy hires Martha M. Masters (Amber Tamblyn), a medical student in the episode "Office Politics". In the episode "Last Temptation", Masters takes the final choice to leave House's team. After being incarcerated following the events of "Moving On", House is released on probation thanks to Foreman, who has taken Cuddy's place as the Dean of Medicine. House is initially assigned a single team member, Dr. Chi Park (Charlyne Yi). After securing funding for his department in the season eight episode "Risky Business", House brings on former prison doctor Jessica Adams (Odette Annable) and rehires Chase and Taub.

Since its premiere, the show has constantly received both high ratings and critical acclaim. Eight seasons were aired in the United States, the fourth of which was interrupted by the 2007–2008 Writers Guild of America strike and included only 16 episodes instead of the regular 22–24. Despite this interruption, House achieved its highest number of viewers for the episode "Frozen", for which there were over 29 million viewers on the night it aired due to its position as the lead-out program for Super Bowl XLII. In January 2009, House moved from its Tuesday, 8:00 pm ET slot to a new time slot of Monday nights at 8:00 pm ET, immediately before the Fox hit 24. Fox renewed the show for a seventh season, which premiered on September 20, 2010. An eighth season was announced on May 10, 2011 and premiered on October 3, 2011. On February 8, 2012, Fox announced that the season would be House's last.

All eight seasons were released on DVD and Blu-ray by Universal in North America, Europe and Australia. As of June 16, 2009, the show has been aired in more than 60 countries, with 86 million viewers worldwide. In the following list, the number in the first column refers to the episode's number within the entire series. The second column indicates the episode's number within that season. "US viewers in millions" refers to the number of Americans in millions who watched the episode live while it was broadcast or by a few hours later with a digital video recorder.

A total of 177 episodes of House were broadcast over eight seasons, with the series finale airing on May 21, 2012.

The show started on November 16, 2004, and received a high viewing rating throughout its run. It achieved a maximum 29.04 million viewers and its highest overall rank is seventh during its third and fourth seasons. It also ranked sixth in the 18–49 age range during its second season.

== Series overview ==
Season	Episodes	Originally released		U.S. viewers (millions)	Rank
Season	Episodes	First released	Last released	U.S. viewers (millions)	Rank
1	22	November 16, 2004	May 24, 2005	13.3	24
2	24	September 13, 2005	May 23, 2006	17.3	10
3	24	September 5, 2006	May 29, 2007	19.4	7
4	16	September 25, 2007	May 19, 2008	17.6	7
5	24	September 16, 2008	May 11, 2009	13.5	16
6	22	September 21, 2009	May 17, 2010	12.8	22
7	23	September 20, 2010	May 23, 2011	10.3	42
8	22	October 3, 2011	May 21, 2012	8.7	58

== Episodes ==
=== Season 1 (2004–05) ===
No. overall	No. in season	Title	Directed by	Written by	Original release date	US viewers (millions)
1	1	"Pilot" "Everybody Lies"	Bryan Singer	David Shore	November 16, 2004	7.05
2	2	"Paternity"	Peter O'Fallon	Lawrence Kaplow	November 23, 2004	6.09
3	3	"Occam's Razor"	Bryan Singer	David Shore	November 30, 2004	6.33
4	4	"Maternity"	Newton Thomas Sigel	Peter Blake	December 7, 2004	6.74
5	5	"Damned If You Do"	Greg Yaitanes	Sara B. Cooper	December 14, 2004	6.91
6	6	"The Socratic Method"	Peter Medak	John Mankiewicz	December 21, 2004	6.73
7	7	"Fidelity"	Bryan Spicer	Thomas L. Moran	December 28, 2004	6.91
8	8	"Poison"	Guy Ferland	Matt Witten	January 25, 2005	12.37
9	9	"DNR"	Frederick King Keller	David Foster	February 1, 2005	12.75
10	10	"Histories"	Dan Attias	Joel Thompson	February 8, 2005	14.97
11	11	"Detox"	Nelson McCormick	Lawrence Kaplow & Thomas L. Moran	February 15, 2005	14.22
12	12	"Sports Medicine"	Keith Gordon	John Mankiewicz & David Shore	February 22, 2005	15.53
13	13	"Cursed"	Daniel Sackheim	Matt Witten & Peter Blake	March 1, 2005	15.63
14	14	"Control"	Randy Zisk	Lawrence Kaplow	March 15, 2005	17.33
15	15	"Mob Rules"	Tim Hunter	David Foster & John Mankiewicz	March 22, 2005	17.34
16	16	"Heavy"	Fred Gerber	Thomas L. Moran	March 29, 2005	18.28
17	17	"Role Model"	Peter O'Fallon	Matt Witten	April 12, 2005	17.83
18	18	"Babies & Bathwater"	Bill Johnson	Story by : Peter Blake; Teleplay by : Peter Blake & David Shore	April 19, 2005	17.48
19	19	"Kids"	Deran Sarafian	Thomas L. Moran & Lawrence Kaplow	May 3, 2005	17.14
20	20	"Love Hurts"	Bryan Spicer	Sara B. Cooper	May 10, 2005	18.80
21	21	"Three Stories"	Paris Barclay	David Shore	May 17, 2005	17.68
22	22	"Honeymoon"	Frederick King Keller	Lawrence Kaplow & John Mankiewicz	May 24, 2005	19.52

=== Season 2 (2005–06) ===
No. overall	No. in season	Title	Directed by	Written by	Original release date	US viewers (millions)
23	1	"Acceptance"	Dan Attias	Russel Friend & Garrett Lerner	September 13, 2005	15.91
24	2	"Autopsy"	Deran Sarafian	Lawrence Kaplow	September 20, 2005	13.64
25	3	"Humpty Dumpty"	Dan Attias	Matt Witten	September 27, 2005	13.37
26	4	"TB or Not TB"	Peter O'Fallon	David Foster	November 1, 2005	13.44
27	5	"Daddy's Boy"	Greg Yaitanes	Thomas L. Moran	November 8, 2005	14.16
28	6	"Spin"	Fred Gerber	Sara Hess	November 15, 2005	12.95
29	7	"Hunting"	Gloria Muzio	Liz Friedman	November 22, 2005	14.72
30	8	"The Mistake"	David Semel	Peter Blake	November 29, 2005	14.91
31	9	"Deception"	Deran Sarafian	Michael R. Perry	December 13, 2005	14.65
32	10	"Failure to Communicate"	Jace Alexander	Doris Egan	January 10, 2006	14.83
33	11	"Need to Know"	David Semel	Pamela Davis	February 7, 2006	22.24
34	12	"Distractions"	Dan Attias	Lawrence Kaplow	February 14, 2006	19.20
35	13	"Skin Deep"	Jim Hayman	Story by : Russel Friend & Garrett Lerner; Teleplay by : Russel Friend & Garrett Lerner & David Shore	February 20, 2006	14.18
36	14	"Sex Kills"	David Semel	Matt Witten	March 7, 2006	20.56
37	15	"Clueless"	Deran Sarafian	Thomas L. Moran	March 28, 2006	21.44
38	16	"Safe"	Félix Alcalá	Peter Blake	April 4, 2006	22.71
39	17	"All In"	Fred Gerber	David Foster	April 11, 2006	21.20
40	18	"Sleeping Dogs Lie"	Greg Yaitanes	Sara Hess	April 18, 2006	22.64
41	19	"House vs. God"	John F. Showalter	Doris Egan	April 25, 2006	24.52
42	20	"Euphoria (Part 1)"	Deran Sarafian	Matthew V. Lewis	May 2, 2006	22.71
43	21	"Euphoria (Part 2)"	Deran Sarafian	Russel Friend & Garrett Lerner & David Shore	May 3, 2006	17.16
44	22	"Forever"	Daniel Sackheim	Liz Friedman	May 9, 2006	24.29
45	23	"Who's Your Daddy?"	Martha Mitchell	Story by : Charles M. Duncan & John Mankiewicz; Teleplay by : John Mankiewicz & Lawrence Kaplow	May 16, 2006	22.38
46	24	"No Reason"	David Shore	Story by : Lawrence Kaplow & David Shore; Teleplay by : David Shore	May 23, 2006	25.47

=== Season 3 (2006–07) ===
No. overall	No. in season	Title	Directed by	Written by	Original release date	US viewers (millions)
47	1	"Meaning"	Deran Sarafian	Story by : Russel Friend & Garrett Lerner & Lawrence Kaplow & David Shore; Teleplay by : Lawrence Kaplow & David Shore	September 5, 2006	19.65
48	2	"Cane and Able"	Daniel Sackheim	Story by : Russel Friend & Garrett Lerner & Lawrence Kaplow & David Shore; Teleplay by : Russel Friend & Garrett Lerner	September 12, 2006	15.22
49	3	"Informed Consent"	Laura Innes	David Foster	September 19, 2006	13.67
50	4	"Lines in the Sand"	Newton Thomas Sigel	David Hoselton	September 26, 2006	14.52
51	5	"Fools for Love"	David Platt	Peter Blake	October 31, 2006	14.18
52	6	"Que Será Será"	Deran Sarafian	Thomas L. Moran	November 7, 2006	16.11
53	7	"Son of Coma Guy"	Dan Attias	Doris Egan	November 14, 2006	14.60
54	8	"Whac-A-Mole"	Daniel Sackheim	Pamela Davis	November 21, 2006	15.20
55	9	"Finding Judas"	Deran Sarafian	Sara Hess	November 28, 2006	17.31
56	10	"Merry Little Christmas"	Tony To	Liz Friedman	December 12, 2006	16.13
57	11	"Words and Deeds"	Daniel Sackheim	Leonard Dick	January 9, 2007	17.78
58	12	"One Day, One Room"	Juan J. Campanella	David Shore	January 30, 2007	27.34
59	13	"Needle in a Haystack"	Peter O'Fallon	David Foster	February 6, 2007	24.88
60	14	"Insensitive"	Deran Sarafian	Matthew V. Lewis	February 13, 2007	25.99
61	15	"Half-Wit"	Katie Jacobs	Lawrence Kaplow	March 6, 2007	24.40
62	16	"Top Secret"	Deran Sarafian	Thomas L. Moran	March 27, 2007	20.80
63	17	"Fetal Position"	Matt Shakman	Russel Friend & Garrett Lerner	April 3, 2007	20.35
64	18	"Airborne"	Elodie Keene	David Hoselton	April 10, 2007	21.57
65	19	"Act Your Age"	Daniel Sackheim	Sara Hess	April 17, 2007	22.41
66	20	"House Training"	Paul McCrane	Doris Egan	April 24, 2007	20.81
67	21	"Family"	David Straiton	Liz Friedman	May 1, 2007	21.13
68	22	"Resignation"	Martha Mitchell	Pamela Davis	May 8, 2007	21.36
69	23	"The Jerk"	Daniel Sackheim	Leonard Dick	May 15, 2007	21.19
70	24	"Human Error"	Katie Jacobs	Thomas L. Moran & Lawrence Kaplow	May 29, 2007	17.23

=== Season 4 (2007–08) ===
No. overall	No. in season	Title	Directed by	Written by	Original release date	US viewers (millions)
71	1	"Alone"	Deran Sarafian	Story by : Peter Blake; Teleplay by : Peter Blake & David Shore	September 25, 2007	18.31
72	2	"The Right Stuff"	Deran Sarafian	Doris Egan & Leonard Dick	October 2, 2007	17.44
73	3	"97 Seconds"	David Platt	Russel Friend & Garrett Lerner	October 9, 2007	18.03
74	4	"Guardian Angels"	Deran Sarafian	David Hoselton	October 23, 2007	18.11
75	5	"Mirror Mirror"	David Platt	David Foster	October 30, 2007	17.30
76	6	"Whatever It Takes"	Juan J. Campanella	Story by : Thomas L. Moran; Teleplay by : Thomas L. Moran & Peter Blake	November 6, 2007	18.17
77	7	"Ugly"	David Straiton	Sean Whitesell	November 13, 2007	16.95
78	8	"You Don't Want to Know"	Lesli Linka Glatter	Sara Hess	November 20, 2007	16.89
79	9	"Games"	Deran Sarafian	Eli Attie	November 27, 2007	16.97
80	10	"It's a Wonderful Lie"	Matt Shakman	Pamela Davis	January 29, 2008	22.56
81	11	"Frozen"	David Straiton	Liz Friedman	February 3, 2008	29.05
82	12	"Don't Ever Change"	Deran Sarafian	Doris Egan & Leonard Dick	February 5, 2008	23.16
83	13	"No More Mr. Nice Guy"	Deran Sarafian	David Hoselton & David Shore	April 28, 2008	14.64
84	14	"Living the Dream"	David Straiton	Sara Hess & Liz Friedman	May 5, 2008	13.48
85	15	"House's Head"	Greg Yaitanes	Story by : Doris Egan; Teleplay by : Peter Blake & David Foster & Russel Friend & Garrett Lerner	May 12, 2008	15.02
86	16	"Wilson's Heart"	Katie Jacobs	Peter Blake, David Foster, Russel Friend & Garrett Lerner	May 19, 2008	16.36

Note 1: This season has fewer episodes due to the 2007–2008 Writers Guild of America strike. Note 2: Universal Media Studios (UMS) replaced NBC Universal Television Studio starting with episode 7 of this season.

=== Season 5 (2008–09) ===
No. overall	No. in season	Title	Directed by	Written by	Original release date	US viewers (millions)
87	1	"Dying Changes Everything"	Deran Sarafian	Eli Attie	September 16, 2008	14.77
88	2	"Not Cancer"	David Straiton	David Shore & Lawrence Kaplow	September 23, 2008	12.38
89	3	"Adverse Events"	Andrew Bernstein	Carol Green & Dustin Paddock	September 30, 2008	12.98
90	4	"Birthmarks"	David Platt	Doris Egan & David Foster	October 14, 2008	13.27
91	5	"Lucky Thirteen"	Greg Yaitanes	Liz Friedman & Sara Hess	October 21, 2008	13.09
92	6	"Joy"	Deran Sarafian	David Hoselton	October 28, 2008	13.50
93	7	"The Itch"	Greg Yaitanes	Peter Blake	November 11, 2008	13.06
94	8	"Emancipation"	Jim Hayman	Pamela Davis & Leonard Dick	November 18, 2008	13.26
95	9	"Last Resort"	Katie Jacobs	Story by : Matthew V. Lewis; Teleplay by : Matthew V. Lewis & Eli Attie	November 25, 2008	12.88
96	10	"Let Them Eat Cake"	Deran Sarafian	Russel Friend & Garrett Lerner	December 2, 2008	12.52
97	11	"Joy to the World"	David Straiton	Peter Blake	December 9, 2008	14.05
98	12	"Painless"	Andrew Bernstein	Thomas L. Moran & Eli Attie	January 19, 2009	15.03
99	13	"Big Baby"	Deran Sarafian	Lawrence Kaplow & David Foster	January 26, 2009	15.69
100	14	"The Greater Good"	Lesli Linka Glatter	Sara Hess	February 2, 2009	14.87
101	15	"Unfaithful"	Greg Yaitanes	David Hoselton	February 16, 2009	14.20
102	16	"The Softer Side"	Deran Sarafian	Liz Friedman	February 23, 2009	14.86
103	17	"The Social Contract"	Andrew Bernstein	Doris Egan	March 9, 2009	12.38
104	18	"Here Kitty"	Juan J. Campanella	Peter Blake	March 16, 2009	13.13
105	19	"Locked In"	Dan Attias	Russel Friend & Garrett Lerner & David Foster	March 30, 2009	12.51
106	20	"Simple Explanation"	Greg Yaitanes	Leonard Dick	April 6, 2009	13.29
107	21	"Saviors"	Matthew Penn	Eli Attie & Thomas L. Moran	April 13, 2009	12.19
108	22	"House Divided"	Greg Yaitanes	Matthew V. Lewis & Liz Friedman	April 27, 2009	11.69
109	23	"Under My Skin"	David Straiton	Pamela Davis & Lawrence Kaplow	May 4, 2009	12.05
110	24	"Both Sides Now"	Greg Yaitanes	Doris Egan	May 11, 2009	12.74

=== Season 6 (2009–10) ===
No. overall	No. in season	Title	Directed by	Written by	Original release date	US viewers (millions)
111	1	"Broken" (Note: Aired as a two hour premiere in the U.S., Canada and Australia, but as two separate episodes in other countries such as the United Kingdom)	Katie Jacobs	Russel Friend & Garrett Lerner & David Foster & David Shore	September 21, 2009	17.13
112	2	"Broken"	Katie Jacobs	Russel Friend & Garrett Lerner & David Foster & David Shore	September 21, 2009	17.13
113	3	"Epic Fail"	Greg Yaitanes	Sara Hess & Liz Friedman	September 28, 2009	14.71
114	4	"The Tyrant"	David Straiton	Peter Blake	October 5, 2009	13.74
115	5	"Instant Karma"	Greg Yaitanes	Thomas L. Moran	October 12, 2009	13.50
116	6	"Brave Heart"	Matt Shakman	Lawrence Kaplow	October 19, 2009	11.65
117	7	"Known Unknowns"	Greg Yaitanes	Matthew V. Lewis & Doris Egan	November 9, 2009	13.31
118	8	"Teamwork"	David Straiton	Eli Attie	November 16, 2009	12.67
119	9	"Ignorance Is Bliss"	Greg Yaitanes	David Hoselton	November 23, 2009	11.95
120	10	"Wilson"	Lesli Linka Glatter	David Foster	November 30, 2009	13.25
121	11	"The Down Low"	Nick Gomez	Sara Hess & Liz Friedman	January 11, 2010	12.25
122	12	"Remorse"	Andrew Bernstein	Peter Blake	January 25, 2010	14.21
123	13	"Moving the Chains"	David Straiton	Russel Friend & Garrett Lerner	February 1, 2010	13.38
124	14	"5 to 9"	Andrew Bernstein	Thomas L. Moran	February 8, 2010	13.60
125	15	"Private Lives"	Sanford Bookstaver	Doris Egan	March 8, 2010	12.82
126	16	"Black Hole"	Greg Yaitanes	Lawrence Kaplow	March 15, 2010	11.37
127	17	"Lockdown"	Hugh Laurie	Story by : Eli Attie & Peter Blake; Teleplay by : Russel Friend & Garrett Lerner & Peter Blake & Eli Attie	April 12, 2010	10.80
128	18	"Knight Fall"	Juan J. Campanella	John C. Kelley	April 19, 2010	10.82
129	19	"Open and Shut"	Greg Yaitanes	Liz Friedman & Sara Hess	April 26, 2010	10.86
130	20	"The Choice"	Juan J. Campanella	David Hoselton	May 3, 2010	9.98
131	21	"Baggage"	David Straiton	Doris Egan & David Foster	May 10, 2010	9.48
132	22	"Help Me"	Greg Yaitanes	Russel Friend & Garrett Lerner & Peter Blake	May 17, 2010	11.06

=== Season 7 (2010–11) ===
No. overall	No. in season	Title	Directed by	Written by	Original release date	US viewers (millions)
133	1	"Now What?"	Greg Yaitanes	Doris Egan	September 20, 2010	10.69
134	2	"Selfish"	Dan Attias	Eli Attie	September 27, 2010	10.18
135	3	"Unwritten"	Greg Yaitanes	John C. Kelley	October 4, 2010	10.78
136	4	"Massage Therapy"	David Straiton	Peter Blake	October 11, 2010	9.69
137	5	"Unplanned Parenthood"	Greg Yaitanes	David Foster	October 18, 2010	9.65
138	6	"Office Politics"	Sanford Bookstaver	Seth Hoffman	November 8, 2010	9.63
139	7	"A Pox on Our House"	Tucker Gates	Lawrence Kaplow	November 15, 2010	10.77
140	8	"Small Sacrifices"	Greg Yaitanes	David Hoselton	November 22, 2010	9.24
141	9	"Larger Than Life"	Miguel Sapochnik	Sara Hess	January 17, 2011	10.52
142	10	"Carrot or Stick"	David Straiton	Liz Friedman	January 24, 2011	10.45
143	11	"Family Practice"	Miguel Sapochnik	Peter Blake	February 7, 2011	12.33
144	12	"You Must Remember This"	David Platt	Kath Lingenfelter	February 14, 2011	9.86
145	13	"Two Stories"	Greg Yaitanes	Thomas L. Moran	February 21, 2011	10.41
146	14	"Recession Proof"	S. J. Clarkson	John C. Kelley	February 28, 2011	11.01
147	15	"Bombshells"	Greg Yaitanes	Liz Friedman & Sara Hess	March 7, 2011	11.08
148	16	"Out of the Chute"	Sanford Bookstaver	Lawrence Kaplow & Thomas L. Moran	March 14, 2011	10.41
149	17	"Fall from Grace"	Tucker Gates	John C. Kelley	March 21, 2011	9.49
150	18	"The Dig"	Matt Shakman	David Hoselton & Sara Hess	April 11, 2011	8.93
151	19	"Last Temptation"	Tim Southam	David Foster & Liz Friedman	April 18, 2011	8.80
152	20	"Changes"	David Straiton	Story by : Eli Attie & Seth Hoffman; Teleplay by : Eli Attie	May 2, 2011	8.57
153	21	"The Fix"	Greg Yaitanes	Story by : Thomas L. Moran; Teleplay by : Thomas L. Moran & David Shore	May 9, 2011	7.94
154	22	"After Hours"	Miguel Sapochnik	Seth Hoffman & Russel Friend & Garrett Lerner	May 16, 2011	8.92
155	23	"Moving On"	Greg Yaitanes	Kath Lingenfelter & Peter Blake	May 23, 2011	9.11

=== Season 8 (2011–12) ===
No. overall	No. in season	Title	Directed by	Written by	Original release date	US viewers (millions)
156	1	"Twenty Vicodin"	Greg Yaitanes	Peter Blake	October 3, 2011	9.78
157	2	"Transplant"	Dan Attias	Liz Friedman & David Foster	October 10, 2011	6.85
158	3	"Charity Case"	Greg Yaitanes	Sara Hess	October 17, 2011	8.34
159	4	"Risky Business"	Sanford Bookstaver	Seth Hoffman	October 31, 2011	6.65
160	5	"The Confession"	Kate Woods	John C. Kelley	November 7, 2011	7.55
161	6	"Parents"	Greg Yaitanes	Eli Attie	November 14, 2011	6.63
162	7	"Dead & Buried"	Miguel Sapochnik	David Hoselton	November 21, 2011	7.46
163	8	"Perils of Paranoia"	David Straiton	Thomas L. Moran	November 28, 2011	7.41
164	9	"Better Half"	Greg Yaitanes	Kath Lingenfelter	January 23, 2012	8.76
165	10	"Runaways"	Sanford Bookstaver	Marqui Jackson	January 30, 2012	8.73
166	11	"Nobody's Fault"	Greg Yaitanes	David Foster & Russel Friend & Garrett Lerner	February 6, 2012	7.09
167	12	"Chase"	Matt Shakman	Peter Blake & Eli Attie	February 13, 2012	7.16
168	13	"Man of the House"	Colin Bucksey	Sara Hess & Liz Friedman	February 20, 2012	7.08
169	14	"Love Is Blind"	Tim Southam	John C. Kelley	February 27, 2012 (Canada); March 19, 2012 (USA) (Note: Episode aired in Canada only on original air date. Fox delayed the United States broadcast three weeks to March 19 because the Daytona 500 had a 30-hour rain delay.)	5.94
170	15	"Blowing the Whistle"	Julian Higgins	Story by : Danny Weiss; Teleplay by : Danny Weiss & Seth Hoffman	April 2, 2012	6.67
171	16	"Gut Check"	Miguel Sapochnik	Jamie Conway & David Hoselton	April 9, 2012	6.01
172	17	"We Need the Eggs"	David Straiton	Peter Blake & Sara Hess	April 16, 2012	5.61
173	18	"Body & Soul"	Stefan Schwartz	Dustin Paddock	April 23, 2012	6.49
174	19	"The C-Word"	Hugh Laurie	John C. Kelley & Marqui Jackson	April 30, 2012	6.45
175	20	"Post Mortem"	Peter Weller	David Hoselton & Kath Lingenfelter	May 7, 2012	6.09
176	21	"Holding On"	Miguel Sapochnik	Russel Friend & Garrett Lerner & David Foster	May 14, 2012	6.45
177	22	"Everybody Dies"	David Shore	David Shore & Peter Blake & Eli Attie	May 21, 2012	8.72

Note 3: Universal Media Studios was replaced by the new modern Universal Television starting with episode 4 of this season.

== Ratings ==
House : U.S. viewers per episode (millions)

Season	Episode number																								Average
Season	1	2	3	4	5	6	7	8	9	10	11	12	13	14	15	16	17	18	19	20	21	22	23	24	Average
1	7.05	6.09	6.33	6.74	6.91	6.73	6.91	12.37	12.75	14.97	14.22	15.53	15.63	17.33	17.34	18.28	17.83	17.48	17.14	18.80	17.68	19.52	–		13.35
2	15.91	13.64	13.37	13.44	14.16	12.95	14.72	14.91	14.65	14.83	22.24	19.20	14.18	20.56	21.44	22.71	21.20	22.64	24.52	22.71	17.16	24.29	22.38	25.47	18.46
3	19.55	15.22	13.67	14.52	14.18	16.11	14.60	15.20	17.31	16.13	17.78	27.34	24.88	25.99	24.40	20.80	20.35	21.57	22.41	20.81	21.13	21.36	21.19	17.23	19.33
4	18.31	17.44	18.03	18.11	17.30	18.17	16.95	16.89	16.97	22.56	29.05	23.16	14.64	13.48	15.02	16.36	–								18.28
5	14.77	12.38	12.98	13.27	13.09	13.50	13.06	13.26	12.88	12.52	14.05	15.03	15.69	14.87	14.20	14.86	12.38	13.13	12.51	13.29	12.19	11.69	12.05	12.74	13.35
6	17.13	17.13	14.71	13.74	13.50	11.65	13.31	12.67	11.95	13.25	12.25	14.21	13.38	13.60	12.82	11.37	10.80	10.82	10.86	9.98	9.48	11.06	–		12.71
7	10.69	10.18	10.78	9.69	9.65	9.63	10.77	9.24	10.52	10.45	12.33	9.86	10.41	11.01	11.08	10.41	9.49	8.93	8.80	8.57	7.94	8.92	9.11	–	9.93
8	9.78	6.85	8.34	6.65	7.55	6.63	7.46	7.41	8.76	8.73	7.09	7.16	7.08	5.94	6.67	6.01	5.61	6.49	6.45	6.09	6.45	8.72	–		7.18

Audience measurement performed by Nielsen Media Research

== Home video releases ==
Season	DVD Releases						Blu-ray			
Season	Region 1		Region 2		Region 4		Region A		Region B	
Season	Date	Discs	Date	Discs	Date	Discs	Date	Discs	Date	Discs
1	August 30, 2005	3	February 27, 2006	6	July 12, 2006	6	N/A		N/A	
2	August 22, 2006	6	October 23, 2006	6	October 25, 2006	6	N/A		N/A	
3	August 21, 2007	5	November 19, 2007	6	September 19, 2007	6	N/A		N/A	
4	August 19, 2008	4	October 27, 2008	4	August 20, 2008	4	N/A		N/A	
5	August 25, 2009	5	October 5, 2009	6	October 30, 2009	6	N/A		N/A	
6	August 31, 2010	5	September 27, 2010	6	August 19, 2010	6	August 31, 2010	5	September 27, 2010	5
7	August 30, 2011	5	September 26, 2011	6	August 30, 2011	6	September 30, 2011	5	September 26, 2011	5
8	August 21, 2012	5	October 22, 2012	6	October 11, 2012	6				
The Complete Series	October 2, 2012	41	October 22, 2012	46	October 11, 2012	46	January 28, 2025	39	June 23, 2014	39

The DVDs have been released encoded for regions 1, 2 and 4 as complete season boxed sets. Season one was initially released in the full-screen format, while all other seasons have been released in their originally-broadcast wide-screen format. On February 10, 2009, season one was re-released in the wide-screen format encoded for region 1. Season six was the first season to be released on Blu-ray.

In North America, Region 1, there was a combined season 1–2 box set with 12 discs and a combined season 3–4 box set with nine discs, both released on May 19, 2009 A season 1–4 boxed set was later discontinued. In the UK, Region 2, there was a season 1–3 boxed set released on November 19, 2007 and season 1–5 boxed set released on October 5, 2009. A season 1–4 boxed set has been discontinued. In Australia, Region 4, a season 1–3 boxed set was released on December 5, 2007; seasons 1–4 were released in a boxed set on November 19, 2008 and the seasons 1–5 boxed set was released on September 10, 2009. The season 1–3 boxed set contains 18 discs; the season 1–4 boxed set contains 22 discs; and the season 1–5 boxed set contains 28 discs.

On October 2, 2012 Universal Studios released the entire series in a 41-disc DVD set.
