= House season 8 =

House
- Season 8
- Region 1 DVD cover art
- Starring: Hugh Laurie; Odette Annable; Omar Epps; Robert Sean Leonard; Charlyne Yi; Olivia Wilde; Jesse Spencer; Peter Jacobson
- No. of episodes: 22

Release
- Original network: Fox
- Original release: October 3, 2011 – May 21, 2012

Season chronology
- ← Previous; Season 7

The eighth and final season of House was ordered on May 10, 2011. It premiered on October 3, 2011. It was the only season not to feature Lisa Edelstein as Dr. Lisa Cuddy. Olivia Wilde (Dr. Remy "Thirteen" Hadley) also left the show after the third episode to further her film career, although she returned at the end of the series. On January 8, 2012, Fox's President of Entertainment, Kevin Reilly, stated that the network had been "avoiding" a decision on the fate of the series, as it was "hard to imagine the network without House" and that the decision on the future of the series would be a "close call". Hugh Laurie's contract on House expired at the end of the eighth season. Laurie stated that once House was over, he would be moving on to strictly film roles. On February 8, 2012, in a joint statement issued by Fox and executive producers David Shore, Katie Jacobs, and Laurie, it was revealed that the season would be the last for House.

It was announced that Shore would direct and co-write the final episode of the show and also that Wilde would return as Thirteen for the penultimate episode and the series finale. Edelstein did not return for the series finale. Kal Penn was reported to be in talks and returned as Dr. Lawrence Kutner. Amber Tamblyn also appeared briefly as Martha M. Masters for the finale. Jennifer Morrison appeared in the finale in a cameo appearance as Allison Cameron. Anne Dudek, Sela Ward and Andre Braugher also reprised their previous recurring/guest roles as Amber Volakis, Stacy Warner, and Darryl Nolan, respectively. The series finale aired on May 21, following a retrospective episode titled "Swan Song".

The opening sequence was changed to add Charlyne Yi and Odette Annable, replacing Edelstein and Wilde. Omar Epps took the place of Edelstein, and Robert Sean Leonard, Jesse Spencer and Peter Jacobson were moved up. Olivia Wilde was credited as "Also Starring" for the episodes she appeared in.

== Cast ==
=== Main cast ===
- Hugh Laurie as Dr. Gregory House
- Odette Annable as Dr. Jessica Adams (episodes 1 and 3–22)
- Omar Epps as Dr. Eric Foreman (episodes 2–13, 15 and 18–22)
- Robert Sean Leonard as Dr. James Wilson (episodes 2–10 and 12–22)
- Charlyne Yi as Dr. Chi Park (episodes 2–22)
- Olivia Wilde as Dr. Remy "Thirteen" Hadley (episodes 3 and 21–22)
- Jesse Spencer as Dr. Robert Chase (episodes 5–20 and 22)
- Peter Jacobson as Dr. Chris Taub (episodes 5–8 and 10–22)

=== Recurring cast ===
- Karolina Wydra as Dominika Petrova-House
- Diane Baker as Blythe House
- Jennifer Crystal Foley as Rachel Taub
- Zena Grey as Ruby
- Yaya DaCosta as Anita
- Tracy Vilar as Nurse Regina
- Ron Perkins as Dr. Ron Simpson
- Patrick Price as Nurse Jeffrey Sparkman
- Noelle Bellinghausen as Emily
- Wayne Lopez as C.O. Alvarez

=== Special guest stars ===
- Andre Braugher as Dr. Darryl Nolan
- Anne Dudek as Dr. Amber Volakis
- Jennifer Morrison as Dr. Allison Cameron
- Kal Penn as Dr. Lawrence Kutner
- Amber Tamblyn as Dr. Martha M. Masters
- Sela Ward as Stacy Warner

=== Guest stars ===
Sarah Aldrich, Ryan Alosio, David Anders, Audrey Marie Anderson, Blake Anderson, Skylar Astin, Sharif Atkins, Mark Atteberry, Jamie Bamber, Thom Barry, E. E. Bell, Blake Bertrand, Brad Carter, Carlie Casey, George Cheung, Kevin Christy, Art Chudabala, Roma Chugami, Charles Chun, Jude Ciccolella, Enzo Cilenti, Jessie Collins, Billy Connolly, Mars M. Crain, Samantha Cutaran, Madison Davenport, Amy Davidson, Natalie Dreyfuss, Natalie Dye, Rachel Eggleston, Jamie Elman, Corri English, Arlen Escarpeta, Greg Finley, Amanda Foreman, Ralph Garman, Alexie Gilmore, Margo Harshman, Nik Isbelle, Jaclyn Jonet, Michael B. Jordan, Deborah Lacey, Lisa Lackey, Jim Lampley, James LeGros, Kai Lennix, Melanie Lynskey, Michael Massee, Heather McComb, Chris McKenna, Julie McNiven, Bridgit Mendler, Wentworth Miller, Derek Mio, Julie Mond, Nate Mooney, Ivo Nandi, Riley Lennon Nice, Michael Nouri, Michael Pare, Robert Pine, Alex Quijano, Channon Roe, Saachiko, John Scurti, Will Shadley, Brian Skala, Michael Bailey Smith, Liza Snyder, Rena Sofer, Sebastian Sozzi, Vincent Spano, Heather Stephens, Patrick Stump, Harrison Thomas, Toni Trucks, Darlene Vogel, Jake Weber, Peter Weller, David Wells, Jaleel White, Kaleti Williams, Jeffrey Wright, Jacob Zachar and Jose Zuniga.

== Episodes ==
No. overall	No. in season	Title	Directed by	Written by	Original release date	US viewers (millions)
156	1	"Twenty Vicodin"	Greg Yaitanes	Peter Blake	October 3, 2011	9.78
Eleven months after driving his car into Cuddy's house, three of which were spent on the run and the other eight in prison, House goes before the parole board and learns he has only five days left before he is released. A local prison gang leader then demands twenty Vicodin pills as an "exit tax." As House scrambles to pay up, he tries to treat another inmate (Sebastian Sozzi) with joint pain while turning Dr. Jessica Adams (Odette Annable) to his point of view. Final diagnosis: Mastocytosis Absent: Omar Epps as Eric Foreman, Jesse Spencer as Robert Chase, Robert Sean Leonard as James Wilson, Peter Jacobson as Chris Taub, and Charlyne Yi as Chi Park.
157	2	"Transplant"	Dan Attias	Liz Friedman & David Foster	October 10, 2011	6.85
After two further months in prison, House is released early after an urgent request by Foreman, who is the new dean of medicine. Things have changed: House has lost his office and his team, while Wilson is mad at him and their friendship is tested. What he has gained is a new "team"—Dr. Chi Park (Charlyne Yi), a smart, young timid resident—and a new case: a set of donor lungs that are failing, threatening the life of Wilson's patient (Liza Snyder). Final diagnosis: Eosinophilic pneumonitis Absent: Jesse Spencer as Robert Chase, Peter Jacobson as Chris Taub, and Odette Annable as Jessica Adams.
158	3	"Charity Case"	Greg Yaitanes	Sara Hess	October 17, 2011	8.34
When a man (Wentworth Miller) collapses after making a million dollar donation, Dr. Park believes his extreme altruism may indicate a neurological disorder, while House sees a way to fund the rebuilding of his old team back together. Meanwhile, Dr. Adams volunteers her services to the department while looking for a new career, and Thirteen (Olivia Wilde) returns to House only to say goodbye again. Final diagnosis: Plummer's disease Absent: Jesse Spencer as Robert Chase and Peter Jacobson as Chris Taub.
159	4	"Risky Business"	Sanford Bookstaver	Seth Hoffman	October 31, 2011	6.65
A CEO (Michael Nouri) begins experiencing vision problems days before a major business decision, and House sees it as the perfect way to fund the department through a little blackmail. Meanwhile, Dr. Park prepares for her disciplinary hearing, and Dr. Adams reveals something about her past. Final diagnosis: Hyperviscosity syndrome secondary to rheumatoid arthritis Absent: Jesse Spencer as Robert Chase and Peter Jacobson as Chris Taub.
160	5	"The Confession"	Kate Woods	John C. Kelley	November 7, 2011	7.55
Chase and Taub return to the team, as the team takes the case of a man (Jamie Bamber) who suffers heart problems while having an affair. When his health worsens, he decides to confess all his past sins to clear his conscience, which compromises his treatment. Meanwhile, House becomes obsessed with finding out if Taub's two daughters are, in fact, actually Taub's. Final diagnosis: Kawasaki syndrome
161	6	"Parents"	Greg Yaitanes	Eli Attie	November 14, 2011	6.63
A teenage boy (Harrison Thomas) attempting to follow in his deceased father's footsteps suffers paralysis at a party. As the team searches for answers, they discover a family secret that threatens the young boy's treatment. Meanwhile, House searches for a valid reason to attend a boxing match in Atlantic City, and Taub must decide whether to allow his ex-wife to move away, taking his daughter with her. Final diagnosis: Syphilis, plus Jarisch–Herxheimer reaction
162	7	"Dead & Buried"	Miguel Sapochnik	David Hoselton	November 21, 2011	7.46
The team takes the case of a teenage girl (Madison Davenport) presenting with anaphylaxis but soon realize that her condition is far more serious when it is discovered that she is pregnant but claiming to be a virgin. House goes to an AA meeting to meet a man whose 4-year-old son has died and his wife divorced him. Determined to find out what happened to the boy, House bribes the cemetery owner to examine the remains of the boy, even as Foreman instructs him to focus on the girl's case. Final diagnosis: Iris: Choriocarcinoma and dissociative identity disorder; boy: Alport syndrome
163	8	"Perils of Paranoia"	David Straiton	Thomas L. Moran	November 28, 2011	7.41
The team takes the case of a prosecutor (Vincent Spano) who suffers an apparent heart attack during a case, but when they discover a huge hidden cache of weapons in his home, they must decide whether it's overprotectiveness or paranoia. Meanwhile, Taub decides to assist Foreman in his romantic affairs, and Park eventually starts to realize she needs to open up herself to the other people. Final diagnosis: Diphtheria
164	9	"Better Half"	Greg Yaitanes	Kath Lingenfelter	January 23, 2012	8.76
A man suffering from early-onset familial Alzheimer's disease (Ivo Nandi) begins vomiting, and is admitted to the hospital, with his wife (Melanie Lynskey) taking care of him. He soon develops aggression and language loss, but the team find it difficult to distinguish his new symptoms from his Alzheimer's. Meanwhile, House and Wilson keep betting on what is causing a woman's apparent asexuality and Foreman debates whether or not he should petition House's parole officer to remove his ankle monitor early. Final diagnosis: Reye's syndrome Absent: Peter Jacobson as Chris Taub
165	10	"Runaways"	Sanford Bookstaver	Marqui Jackson	January 30, 2012	8.73
The team takes the case of a teenage girl (Bridgit Mendler) who begins bleeding from her ear during an exam. She is thriving without parental influence and lives alone in a house, but Adams debates calling Social Services anyway. However, when her estranged mother shows up, the girl loses her right to consent to treatment. Meanwhile, Taub tries to connect with his daughters, and House tries to blackmail Foreman on his relationship with a married woman. Final diagnosis: Ascariasis
166	11	"Nobody's Fault"	Greg Yaitanes	David Foster & Russel Friend & Garrett Lerner	February 6, 2012	7.09
House and his team face a disciplinary hearing with Dr. Cofield (Jeffrey Wright) after a chemistry teacher (David Anders) is admitted to the hospital with paralysis. But things turn bad when in a fit of psychosis and violence, the patient stabs Chase, ultimately forcing the team into a race against time as they battle to keep Chase alive in the ER. As the patient is going to be transferred, House realizes his syndrome and informs his wife. As he is on the hearing with Dr. Cofield, he is prepared to send House to prison again, but the wife of the patient arrives and thanks him for his correct treatment. Dr. Cofield sets him free, but House berates him for his cowardice as it was obvious that he would have been arrested, so he let him loose to avoid media attention. Final diagnosis: Tumor lysis syndrome and steroid-induced psychosis
167	12	"Chase"	Matt Shakman	Peter Blake & Eli Attie	February 13, 2012	7.16
Chase's near-death experience has him questioning if he should return to House's team. Meanwhile, he takes the case of a clinic patient (Julie Mond), a nun on the verge of making her vows, when she begins vomiting and exhibiting neurological symptoms. During the course of her treatment, he develops feelings for her which compromise his objectivity. In a subplot, House subjects Taub to a series of prankish 'ambushes' in order to prove to him, in light of Chase's stabbing, that nobody can fully prepare for the unexpected. Final diagnosis: Giant-cell arteritis
168	13	"Man of the House"	Colin Bucksey	Sara Hess & Liz Friedman	February 20, 2012	7.08
A marriage counselor (Jake Weber) collapses during a speaking engagement, when it is discovered that, in addition to vision and liver problems, his low testosterone levels are affecting his marriage and career for the better. Meanwhile, House's wife returns to prepare House for their meeting with Homeland Security for her green card, as the team vies for a position as House's second-in-command. Final diagnosis: Silent thyroiditis secondary to polyglandular autoimmune syndrome type III
169	14	"Love Is Blind"	Tim Southam	John C. Kelley	February 27, 2012 (Canada); March 19, 2012 (USA) (Note: Episode aired in Canada only on original air date. Fox delayed the United States broadcast three weeks to March 19 because the Daytona 500 had a 30-hour rain delay.)	5.94
An independent blind man (Michael B. Jordan) is admitted to the hospital after suffering auditory hallucinations, and soon begins coughing up blood. However, his treatment could leave him more disabled than before. Meanwhile, House’s mother (Diane Baker) surprises him at Princeton Plainsboro to tell him about a new relationship with his old doctor (Billy Connolly), who might be his biological father. Final diagnosis: Mucormycosis Absent: Omar Epps as Eric Foreman NOTE: Daytona 500 rain delay of 30 hours forced the Fox broadcast in the United States to air on March 19, three weeks after the episode aired in Canada.
170	15	"Blowing the Whistle"	Julian Higgins	Story by : Danny Weiss; Teleplay by : Danny Weiss & Seth Hoffman	April 2, 2012	6.67
A soldier (Arlen Escarpeta) returning from overseas, accused of treason after releasing a video showing soldiers killing civilians, collapses and is taken to Princeton-Plainsboro. He soon refuses treatment until he has the opportunity to explain his decision to the masses. Meanwhile, Adams and the team believe House is seriously ill. Final diagnosis: Typhus
171	16	"Gut Check"	Miguel Sapochnik	Jamie Conway & David Hoselton	April 9, 2012	6.01
House and the team take the case of a minor league hockey player (Greg Finley) who began coughing up blood after a fight on the ice. Meanwhile, House reveals to Wilson that he might have an 11-year-old son, and Park moves in with Chase after a fight with her mother. Final diagnosis: Miller Fisher syndrome Absent: Omar Epps as Eric Foreman
172	17	"We Need the Eggs"	David Straiton	Peter Blake & Sara Hess	April 16, 2012	5.61
A man (Kevin Christy) is admitted to the hospital when he begins crying blood, but the team suspects a neurological component when they meet his "girlfriend"—a very lifelike sex doll with whom he's fallen in love, and he also admits why. Meanwhile, House confronts his insecurities when his hooker/companion decides to leave him. Final diagnosis: Primary amoebic meningoencephalitis Absent: Omar Epps as Eric Foreman
173	18	"Body & Soul"	Stefan Schwartz	Dustin Paddock	April 23, 2012	6.49
A boy (Riley Lennon Nice) is admitted to the hospital after nightmares about being choked led to breathing problems. His mother tries to balance the medical diagnoses of the team with his Hmong grandfather's belief that the boy is possessed. Meanwhile, Chase and Park debate the meaning of their sex dreams, Dominika discovers House's deception, and Wilson tells House that he (Wilson) has cancer (Stage 2 Thymoma). Final diagnosis: Patent ductus arteriosus (Lue) and Stage 2 thymoma (Wilson)
174	19	"The C-Word"	Hugh Laurie	John C. Kelley & Marqui Jackson	April 30, 2012	6.45
A six-year-old girl (Rachel Eggleston) with a rare genetic disorder (Ataxia Telangiectasia) is admitted to the hospital after suffering a nosebleed and losing consciousness. Foreman has the team consult with her mother (Jessica Collins), who is also an expert in her daughter's condition. Meanwhile, Wilson decides on a radical and potentially fatal course of treatment for his cancer, which House agrees to administer himself. Final diagnosis: Atrial myxoma
175	20	"Post Mortem"	Peter Weller	David Hoselton & Kath Lingenfelter	May 7, 2012	6.09
When the hospital's coroner (Jamie Elman) begins slicing his own scalp open, he is admitted but will only accept medical care personally decided on by House. However, House is unreachable as he and Wilson embark on a journey for Wilson to forget his upcoming scan and let loose. Meanwhile, a conversation with the patient leads Chase to re-evaluate his career. Final diagnosis: Hypothyroidism secondary to repeated triclosan and caffeine exposure
176	21	"Holding On"	Miguel Sapochnik	Russel Friend & Garrett Lerner & David Foster	May 14, 2012	6.45
A college student (Skylar Astin) is admitted with dizziness and nosebleeds but the team soon discovers that he hears his dead brother's voice, and they must try to decide which of his symptoms are psychological in nature. Meanwhile, House and Wilson deal with the fact that the cancer treatment failed; Wilson decides to stop further treatment and die with dignity, while House's pranks inadvertently violate his court probation, which leaves him inevitably facing incarceration well past Wilson's final months. Final diagnosis: Persistent stapedial artery Absent: Jesse Spencer as Robert Chase
177	22	"Everybody Dies"	David Shore	David Shore & Peter Blake & Eli Attie	May 21, 2012	8.72
After failing to get out of his upcoming jail time, House disappears and his team, along with Wilson and Thirteen (Olivia Wilde), are unable to locate him. He awakens in a burning building after shooting heroin with his former patient (James LeGros). With his life crumbling around him, House hallucinates people from his past (Braugher, Dudek, Morrison, Penn, Tamblyn, Ward) as he decides whether his life is worth living anymore. Believing House dead, members of the staff and family pay funeral tributes to him, including Wilson, who denounces his selfishness until getting an odd text message—luring him to meet a very alive House, who faked his death to remake his life. Back at PPTH, Foreman settles into Cuddy's old job, and Chase succeeds House as director of diagnostic medicine, with Adams and Park as his new team. Meanwhile, Taub dines with Rachel, Ruby, and his daughters, and a re-married Cameron has become a mother and chief of a Chicago emergency room. Mounting motorcycles together, House offers to help make Wilson's last months of life liveable. Final diagnosis: Autoimmune response to an inhaled piece of plant matter
