= We Need the Eggs =

- House episode
- Episode no.: Season 8 Episode 17
- Directed by: David Straiton
- Written by: Peter Blake; Sara Hess
- Original air date: April 16, 2012

Guest appearances
- Kevin Christy as Henry; Karolina Wydra as Dominika Petrova-House; Amy Davidson as Molly; Noelle Bellinghausen as Emily; Patrick Stump as Micah; Nik Isbelle as Amy

Episode chronology
← Previous "Gut Check"	Next → "Body & Soul"
- House season 8

"We Need the Eggs" is the seventeenth episode of the eighth season of House and the 172nd overall. Directed by David Straiton and written by Peter Blake and Sara Hess, it aired on Fox on April 16, 2012.

== Plot ==
House and the team take on the case of a man, Henry, who starts tearing up blood. Meanwhile, House is interviewing for a new favorite hooker, since his current favorite, Emily, has decided to get married and leave the business. However, Wilson wants House to concentrate on Dominika. Instead, desperate for Emily's companionship, House teams up with Dominika to sabotage Emily’s budding relationship.

== Reception ==
The Onion's AV Club gave this episode a B− rating, while Lisa Palmer of TV Fanatic gave it a 4.0/5.0 rating.
