= Twenty Vicodin =

- House episode
- Episode no.: Season 8 Episode 1
- Directed by: Greg Yaitanes
- Written by: Peter Blake
- Original air date: October 3, 2011

Guest appearances
- Thom Barry as Dr. Sykes; Sebastian Sozzi as Nick; Jaleel White as Porter; Michael Massee as Frankie; Michael Paré as Warden Delaire; Michael Bailey Smith as Sullivan; Nate Mooney as Rollo; Mars M. Crain as Stomper; Kaleti Williams as Curtis Asofa; Wayne Lopez as C.O. Álvarez; Jude Ciccolella as Mendelson

Episode chronology
← Previous "Moving On"	Next → "Transplant"
- House season 8

"Twenty Vicodin" is the eighth season premiere episode of the American television medical drama series House and the 156th overall episode of the series. It aired on Fox on October 3, 2011. The episode introduces a new regular cast member to the series, Odette Annable, who plays Dr. Jessica Adams. Jaleel White, who played Steve Urkel on the ABC show Family Matters, makes a guest appearance in the episode. In the episode, the storyline picks up eleven months after the season seventh finale with House in prison.

== Plot ==
Eight months after being imprisoned for driving his car into Cuddy's living room, House has five days before he is granted parole, to which he has become eligible due to space issues and relatively good behavior. He faces trouble with prison gangs, mainly their leader (Jude Ciccolella), who extorts him into paying them "twenty Vicodin" as "exit tax", and meets Jessica Adams (Odette Annable), a young prison doctor who becomes fascinated with his medical skills. When a fellow prisoner collapses due to mysterious symptoms, House races against the clock and the head prison doctor to find the cure. During his imprisonment period, House has not had any phone calls or visitors; as House explains, human contact is what brought him there to begin with. In the end, House cures the man, but not without punishment from the parole board.

== Production ==
"Twenty Vicodin", the eighth season premiere of House, was written by Peter Blake. It debuted actress Odette Annable as Dr. Jessica Adams, a doctor working at the prison where Dr. House is incarcerated. David Shore stated that it was a challenge for him to appropriately punish House for the deed in the season 7 finale without turning the series into a prison show or changing House's characteristics (while changing the environment around him, i.e. removing Cuddy and "chilling" his relationship with Wilson), and that is why he decided to pick up the story eight months after House's incarceration.

== Reception ==
=== Ratings ===
With 9.78 million viewers, "Twenty Vicodin" was the 8th most watched program of the night. This was a decrease of 0.76 million viewers from the season seven premiere, but an increase of 0.67 million from the season 7 finale. The episode was the 14th most watched program of the week for adults 18-49. The season premiere was the second most watched program of the week in Canada with 2.81 million viewers.

=== Critical reception ===
The episode received generally positive reviews. The A.V. Club initially gave this episode a B− rating. Anthony Ocasio of ScreenRant.com gave the episode a positive review, stating "the House season 8 premiere presents a wonderfully crafted case study, penned by executive producer Peter Blake, on the man that is House, in which Hugh Laurie masterfully traverses a new environment filled with intriguing challenges and compelling characters." Joseph Oliveto from screencrave.com gave the episode a very good review, awarding the episode 9/10. Oliveto commented that Twenty Vicodin was "A tense season-opener [that] assures us that “House” hasn’t lost the magic".
