= Dead and Buried =

Dead and Buried may refer to:

== Film and TV ==
- Dead & Buried, a 1981 film directed by Gary Sherman
- Dead and Buried (Bernice Summerfield), an animated webcast based on the Doctor Who spin-off series Bernice Summerfield
- "Dead and Buried" (House), an episode from season eight of House, M.D.
- Dead and Buried (TV series), a 2024 adaptation of the play Bag for Life by Colin Bateman

== Music ==
- Dead and Buried (album), a 2001 album by Jungle Rot
- "Dead & Buried", a song by A Day to Remember from Common Courtesy
- "Dead and Buried", a song by Plan B from Who Needs Actions When You Got Words
- "Dead and Buried", a song by Alien Sex Fiend
