= Transplant (House) =

- House episode
- Episode no.: Season 8 Episode 2
- Directed by: Dan Attias
- Written by: David Foster; Liz Friedman
- Original air date: October 10, 2011

Guest appearances
- Liza Snyder as Vanessa; Heather McComb as Theresa; Ron Perkins as Dr. Ron Simpson; Charles Rahi Chun as Kwansik Park; Ralph Garman as Bobby; Wayne Lopez as C.O. Álvarez

Episode chronology
← Previous "Twenty Vicodin"	Next → "Charity Case"
- House season 8

"Transplant" is the second episode of the eighth season of the American television medical drama series House and the 157th overall episode of the series and features the introduction of Charlyne Yi as Dr. Chi Park. It aired on Fox on October 10, 2011.

== Plot ==
After the events in "Twenty Vicodin", House is two months into the additional eight added to his sentence. However, Eric Foreman (who is now the new Dean of Medicine, because Cuddy resigned the day after the events of "Moving On") makes House an offer: he would receive the opportunity for conditional release and return to the PPTH team to treat a set of donor lungs that are failing, organs that Wilson's patient (Liza Snyder) needs. House is working in medicine again, but he realizes that many things have changed: he now has a tiny office, has a limited supply of Vicodin, lost his team (Chase, Taub and Thirteen have all left for greener pastures), and his relationship with Wilson is challenged once again. For his "team", House is forced to work on the case with smart yet timid resident Dr. Chi Park (Charlyne Yi). House and Dr. Park are left with one last option to examine the patient's medical history that could compromise House's conditional agreement with the hospital. Meanwhile, House tries to get back his relationship with Wilson.

In the end, Foreman gets House part of his old office back. Wilson enters the office, punches House to the ground to get even with him, and they reconcile.

== Reception ==
The A.V. Club gave this episode a B rating.

== Music ==
- "Yesterday Was Hard On All Of Us" by Fink
