= Man of the House (House) =

- House episode
- Episode no.: Season 8 Episode 13
- Directed by: Colin Bucksey
- Written by: Sara Hess & Liz Friedman
- Original air date: February 20, 2012

Guest appearances
- Jake Weber as Joe Reese; Rena Sofer as Marlene Reese; Karolina Wydra as Dominika Petrova-House; José Zúñiga as INS Investigator Nate Weinmann

Episode chronology
← Previous "Chase"	Next → "Love Is Blind"
- House season 8

"Man of the House" is the thirteenth episode of the eighth season of House and the 168th overall. It aired on Fox on February 20, 2012. The episode marks the return of Dominika Petrova to the series for a mini-arc, and guest stars José Zúñiga as the immigration official.

== Plot ==
House treats a marriage expert who collapses during a seminar. However, as the patient gets worse, so do his feelings about the institution he's an expert on. House's attention is focused on his own "marriage" when his green-card wife Dominika returns in order to prove to the immigration authorities that she and House are in a "bona fide" marriage. Faced with jail for House and deportation for Dominika, this turns into a crash course in which both will learn a little something about love and marriage while they learn about each other. House also decides to formally appoint one of his fellows as the team leader. Final diagnosis: Silent thyroiditis secondary to polyglandular autoimmune syndrome type III.

== Reception ==
The Onion's AV Club gave this episode a B− rating, while Lisa Palmer of TV Fanatic gave it a 3.0/5.0 rating.
