= Charity Case =

- House episode
- Episode no.: Season 8 Episode 3
- Directed by: Greg Yaitanes
- Written by: Sara Hess
- Original air date: October 17, 2011

Guest appearances
- Wentworth Miller as Benjamin Byrd; Ron Perkins as Dr. Ron Simpson; Toni Trucks as Trina

Episode chronology
← Previous "Transplant"	Next → "Risky Business"
- House season 8

"Charity Case" is the third episode of the eighth season of the American television medical drama series House and the 158th overall episode of the series. It aired on Fox in the United States on October 17, 2011. It is also the penultimate episode with Olivia Wilde as Dr. Remy Hadley (Thirteen). This episode seems loosely based on the American investor Zell Kravinsky, even using his quote that "to withhold a kidney from someone who would otherwise die means valuing one’s own life at 4,000 times that of a stranger".

== Plot ==
Philanthropist Benjamin Byrd (Wentworth Miller) collapses outside of a training center for the homeless where he's made an incognito visit. When brought into Princeton Plainsboro, he offers a large payment to the hospital so that House will be able to reassemble his diagnostics team. Wilson is also placed in an ethical bind because Byrd offers a kidney to one of Wilson's needy patients. The team tries to determine whether Byrd's generosity is a symptom of mental instability, something confirmed when he offers his other kidney to Thirteen and says he's willing to live on dialysis.

Dr. Jessica Adams works with House on a volunteer basis. She and Dr. Park clash over both their diagnoses of the patient and Adams' insistence on giving the proud Park increasingly large gifts, finally paying for House's car repair under the impression that it is Park's car.

House reaches out to the retired Thirteen. She aids him on the case and is nearly persuaded to return to the diagnostic team full-time. He then fires her so that she can go to Greece with her new girlfriend guilt-free.

== Reception ==
This episode was watched by 8.34 million US viewers. The A.V. Club gave this episode a B rating.

== Trivia ==
Because of this episode a Dutch man donated a kidney to a stranger in 2012.
