= Post Mortem (House) =

- House episode
- Episode no.: Season 8 Episode 20
- Directed by: Peter Weller
- Written by: David Hoselton Kath Lingenfelter
- Original air date: May 7, 2012

Guest appearances
- Jamie Elman as Dr. Peter Treiber; Peter Weller as Dr. Penza

Episode chronology
← Previous "The C-Word"	Next → "Holding On"
- House season 8

"Post Mortem" is the twentieth episode of the eighth season of House and the 175th overall. It aired on May 7, 2012 on FOX.

== Plot ==
The team takes on the case of Dr. Peter Treiber, a pathologist at Princeton-Plainsboro Teaching Hospital suddenly begins slicing his own scalp open during an autopsy. Treiber knows too much about the hospital staff to trust any of the physicians, thus adding to the drama. The only person he does respect is House.

Wilson has decided not to wait around Princeton-Plainsboro for his test results. He buys a new car and convinces House, by threatening to drug him and take him along anyway, to go on an unannounced road trip with him. Leaving their phones behind, this results in House's "mysterious" disappearance. House decides to take advantage of Wilson's condition to get some sympathy from the people they meet.

With House absent, the team has to figure out how to treat Treiber while making him believe that House is calling all the shots. It becomes even more difficult when it turns out that the patient has a grudge against Chase, and this just forces Chase to confront his own choices in life.

== Reception ==
The A.V. Club gave this episode a B rating, while Lisa Palmer of TV Fanatic gave it a 4.8/5.0 rating.
