= Holding On (House) =

- House episode
- Episode no.: Season 8 Episode 21
- Directed by: Miguel Sapochnik
- Written by: Russel Friend; Garrett Lerner; David Foster
- Original air date: May 14, 2012

Guest appearances
- Skylar Astin as Derrick; Natalie Dreyfuss as Courtney; Jacob Zachar as Mikey; Derek Mio as Floyd; Enzo Cilenti as Lawyer Matt Johnson

Episode chronology
← Previous "Post Mortem"	Next → "Everybody Dies"
- House season 8

"Holding On" is the twenty-first episode of the eighth season of House and the 176th overall. It aired on May 14, 2012 on FOX.

== Plot ==
The team takes on the case of Derrick (guest star Skylar Astin), a 19-year-old college student who had a mysterious nosebleed during cheerleading practice. As they search his room they find a hidden photograph of a young boy. The patient confesses it's a picture of his brother, who died ten years ago. He hid the picture from his mother, who has always refused to talk about the tragedy. The team thinks he might be suffering from schizophrenia, since Derrick claims to hear his deceased brother's voice in his head. After an MRI reveals no clue, House solves the case by diagnosing the patient with a persistent stapedial artery, a small artery near his eardrum that normally disappears during the early months of development. The patient is doubtful about an operation because he may never hear his brother's voice again and drinks ammonia to avoid treatment. This enrages House, who is desperate from Wilson's situation and tries to strangle the patient. The patient eventually agrees to an operation. As he wakes up, his mother starts showing him pictures of his deceased brother.

Due to his cancer giving him only five months to live, Wilson becomes resigned to his fate and does not want any further treatment, making House very angry. He tries several methods to make Wilson change his mind, including drugging him and administering an anesthetic to render him unconscious and simulate the experience of death. After a serious talk with Thirteen, House appears to give in and takes Wilson to dinner. After dinner, Wilson looks ready to change his mind, until he realizes that it was yet another plot by House and runs away in distress. In revenge for Foreman seemingly trying to take the place of Wilson, House clogs the plumbing of a hospital toilet, causing severe flooding to the point that a ceiling collapses, injuring Adams and Park and damaging an expensive MRI machine. Wilson feels responsible for House's state of mind and offers to spend his last five months with House in a pleasant way. As they plan a hiking trip, Foreman comes in and tells them an investigation into the flooding situation revealed that House was responsible for the damage. Due to the incident, House will probably have his parole revoked. He will have to go back to jail for the rest of his sentence, which amounts to six months - a month longer than Wilson is expected to live.

== Reception ==
The A.V. Club gave this episode a B− rating, while Lisa Palmer of TV Fanatic gave it a 4.3/5.0 rating.
