= Chase (House episode) =

- House episode
- Episode no.: Season 8 Episode 12
- Directed by: Matt Shakman
- Written by: Peter Blake & Eli Attie
- Original air date: February 13, 2012

Guest appearance
- Julie Mond as Moira Parker

Episode chronology
← Previous "Nobody's Fault"	Next → "Man of the House"
- House season 8

"Chase" is the twelfth episode of the season eight of House and the 167th overall. It aired on Fox on February 13, 2012. The format of this episode is similar to "5 to 9" and "Wilson" (both from season six).

== Plot ==
The episode, as its title suggests, is centered on Dr. Robert Chase, who is coping—both physically and mentally—and recuperating from his injuries suffered from being stabbed in the previous episode, "Nobody's Fault".

Since his injury, Chase has been avoiding House and his work at Princeton-Plainsboro Teaching Hospital, instead undergoing physical therapy and what Foreman calls his "night-time version of it". Still on crutches, he is persuaded by Foreman to return to clinic duty, where he encounters a postulant complaining of sudden-onset left shoulder pain. In private, the patient admits to Chase that she's having second thoughts about her imminent vows to enter the convent. Chase suspects breast cancer or angina pectoris, and admits her.

Wilson clears the patient of cancer, leaving her shoulder pain without a clear cause. House enters with the team and begins probing why Chase took this particular case. Chase leaves to avoid House's badgering, but not before House surmises that the patient has a fungal infection.

Chase and the patient begin to connect further, finding a shared love of surfing and tenuous motivations to faith: Chase was driven to enter the seminary by his unstable family life, whereas the patient claims that no particular event is driving her to become a nun. She begins suffering from nausea and vomiting, ruling out fungal infection. Chase finds House on the mezzanine, attempting to pelt Taub with soda-filled water balloons, and again deflects House's questions about his motivations.

Each member of House's team offers Chase sympathy and personal help, but Chase manages to avoid their help and always replies with "Just knowing you're there is enough for me". The patient's foot goes numb, and a round of team diagnostics leads to the conclusion of vasospasm and prescription of calcium channel blockers, which prompts a seemingly-full recovery. During her discharge, the patient admits to Chase that she is joining the nunnery because she was a nanny whose two-year-old charge was killed under her care. Chase tells her that she is running away.

House accuses Chase of fearing real intimacy. Chase denies emotional involvement with his patient, but finds her on his doorstep that night. She tells Chase that he was right; the two kiss and go into his apartment.

The next morning, the former postulant seems ready to abandon her convent plans. Their conversation in bed is interrupted by her suddenly developing a swollen neck and tinnitus, indicating a carotid artery dissection. Chase rushes her to the hospital, where House deduces that Chase and his patient spent the night together. Despite the team's opposition, House backs Chase as the best surgeon available to perform the emergency surgery, and the patient pulls through. When she wakes, she tells Chase that she saw the dead two-year-old while anesthetized. After the surgery Chase goes to House and tells him he found nodules in her neck, and House comes up with syphilis.

Meanwhile all others in the team are also traumatized by Chase's stabbing from the previous episode and took steps to cope up with it. Adams took a trauma counselling and Taub took self-defense classes which causes House to try and prank him frequently, but Taub always manages to defend himself every time.

Foreman removes Chase from the case, citing the potential fallout of Chase's personal involvement should the patient die from her illness. An angry Chase confronts Adams, Foreman's informant, but she replies that she is saving his career. With the addition of liver failure to the patient's symptoms, the team diagnoses lymphoma; House apologetically cuts off Chase's attempts to find a less-lethal conclusion. Breaking the news to the patient, Chase reveals that he left the seminary after he was caught sleeping with the groundskeeper's wife, and admits that he has always struggled with faith.

The patient suffers one more symptom, jaw claudication, which changes the diagnosis to giant cell arteritis. Chase and House prescribe steroids, and the patient quickly begins to return to health. Chase asks her to surf with him, but she tells him that her near-death vision has convinced her to join the nunnery.

House finds Chase researching near-death experiences and chides him for selfishly attempting to deflate her hopes, even if they are in his view a delusion. Chase accuses House of trying to make him suffer like House does; House responds that if he wanted that, he would be urging Chase to "make a stupid stubborn decision that blows up your life and leaves you lonely and miserable". He also says that people only reassess their life when they make a mistake and that he didn't make one and was just 'stabbed'. Even still Chase goes to give her a presentation he has made on 'noradrenalin and near-death experiences' but throws it in the bin after he sees her praying in her bed. He talks to her and then goes to Park who has become overly protective since the stabbing and tells her to do a procedure without referring a book.

After a final fond farewell, Chase's patient departs for the convent. Chase finally abandons his crutches and takes up his usual place with the team. House acknowledges him with a nod.

== Reception ==
The Onion's AV Club gave this episode a C+ rating, while Lisa Palmer of TV Fanatic gave it a 4.0/5.0 rating.
