= Nobody's Fault (House) =

- House episode
- Episode no.: Season 8 Episode 11
- Directed by: Greg Yaitanes
- Written by: Russel Friend, Garrett Lerner & David Foster
- Original air date: February 6, 2012

Guest appearances
- Jeffrey Wright as Dr. Walter Cofield; Audrey Marie Anderson as Emily Koppelman; David Anders as Bill Koppelman; Deborah Lacey as Lorraine

Episode chronology
| ← Previous "Runaways" | Next → "Chase" |
- House season 8

"Nobody's Fault" is the eleventh episode of the eighth season of House and the 166th overall. It aired on Fox on February 6, 2012. This marked director Greg Yaitanes' 30th and final directorial effort on House.

== Plot ==
House and his team are subjected to a disciplinary hearing after their patient suffered a psychotic breakdown and stabbed Chase. The hearing is conducted by Dr. Walter Colfield, Foreman's former mentor at Johns Hopkins University.

The patient is a chemistry teacher who was injured during a chemistry experiment gone wrong. An explosion occurs which initiates the medical issue. Each member of the team comes up with a different initial diagnosis. As Chase attempts to biopsy the patient's rash, the patient suffers another psychotic episode and stabs Chase with a scalpel, lacerating his heart. Chase survives surgery but is left paralyzed. House concludes that the paralysis is caused by a blood clot. Chase regains feeling when surgery is performed to remove the clot that is pressing on his spine, but he faces extensive physical therapy.

House goes to see the patient before he is transferred. He finds his wife and tells her that her husband has a lymph node tumor and requires full body radiation therapy and plasmapheresis.

During the last day of the hearing, Dr. Colfield calls House brilliant but a fiasco; however, the patient's wife speaks up on House's behalf, saying House "saved my husband's life". At this point Colfield decides that House is an important part of the hospital and he would damage the hospital by sending him back to prison. Therefore, he rules that the accident was "nobody's fault". House before leaving accuses Colfield of being a coward, he then goes to see Chase, who is doing his rehabilitation exercises. House tells Chase how Colfield decided that his stabbing was nobody's fault, but he then says, "they're wrong, I'm sorry." Chase blows him off, asking him if he's done, stating that he's kind of busy at the moment. House leaves without saying anything else.

== Reception ==
The A.V. Club gave this episode a B− rating, while Lisa Palmer of TV Fanatic gave the episode 4.5/5.0. It had 7.09 million viewers and fourth in its time slot behind The Voice on NBC, How I Met Your Mother on CBS and The Bachelor on ABC.
