= Parents (House) =

- House episode
- Episode no.: Season 8 Episode 6
- Directed by: Greg Yaitanes
- Written by: Eli Attie
- Original air date: November 14, 2011

Guest appearances
- Harrison Thomas as Ben Parker; Elizabeth Lackey as Janey Parker; John Scurti as Monroe; Jennifer Crystal Foley as Rachel Taub; Jim Lampley as himself; Zena Grey as Ruby; Käthe Mazur as Sandy; Mark Atteberry as Phil

Episode chronology
← Previous "The Confession"	Next → "Dead & Buried"
- House season 8

"Parents" is the sixth episode of the eighth season of the American television medical drama series House and the 161st overall episode of the series. It aired on Fox in the United States on November 14, 2011.

== Plot ==
Ben Parker, a patient who wishes to follow in his father's footsteps as an entertainer, is admitted with partial paralysis. As they look for a bone marrow match, the team discovers a disturbing family secret. Meanwhile, House looks for creative ways to remove his ankle monitor so that he can attend a boxing match in Atlantic City. John Scurti plays a patient convinced he is suffering from diabetes. Taub faces a major decision when his ex-wife Rachel announces she plans on moving across country with their daughter.

Jennifer Crystal Foley and Zena Grey return to the series.

== Reception ==
The A.V. Club gave this episode a C+ rating. It was watched by 6.63 million viewers.
