= Stapedial branch of posterior auricular artery =

Artery of the inner ear

Details
- Precursor: Aortic arch 2
- Source: Posterior auricular artery

Identifiers
- Latin: ramus stapedius arteriae auricularis posterioris
- TA98: A12.2.05.041
- TA2: 4409
- FMA: 49638

In human anatomy, the stapedial branch of posterior auricular artery, or stapedial artery for short, is a small artery supplying the stapedius muscle in the inner ear.

== Structure ==
=== In humans ===
In humans, the stapedial artery is normally present in the fetus where it connects what is to become the external and internal carotid arteries. Part of the carotid artery system, it originates from the dorsal branch of aortic arch. Its superior supraorbital branch becomes the middle meningeal artery, while its infraorbital and mandibular branches fuses with the external carotid artery and later become the internal maxillary artery. Its trunk atrophies and is replaced by branches from the external carotid artery.

In rare cases, the embryonic structure is still present after birth in which case it is referred to as a persistent stapedial artery (PSA). While the prevalence of this anomaly is unknown, it has been estimated to be present in 1 of 5,000 people.

=== In other mammals ===
Structures homologous to the stapedial artery in humans and other primates can be derived from a primitive, hypothetical pattern similar to that found in primitive rodents: the stapedial artery enters the middle cranial fossa and splits into the anterior and inferior divisions of the superior ramus and the inferior ramus. The inferior ramus has been lost in strepsirhines while the stem of the stapedial artery has been reduced in haplorhines.
