= Perils of Paranoia =

- House episode
- Episode no.: Season 8 Episode 8
- Directed by: David Straiton
- Written by: Thomas L. Moran
- Original air date: November 28, 2011

Guest appearances
- Vincent Spano as Assistant District Attorney Tommy; Amanda Foreman as Olivia; Yaya DaCosta as Anita; Tracy Vilar as Nurse Regina; Blake Anderson as Ethan

Episode chronology
← Previous "Dead & Buried"	Next → "Better Half"
- House season 8

"Perils of Paranoia" is the eighth episode of the eighth season of the American television medical drama series House and the 163rd overall episode of the series. It aired on Fox on November 28, 2011.

A district attorney appears to suffer from a heart attack while cross-examining a witness. The initial diagnosis is hyper-anxiety, but the team finds an arsenal at the patient's home and start to believe that his extreme paranoia is a physical symptom. Wilson becomes convinced that House is lying about not having a gun, which leads to an epic battle of wits between the two men. Park tries to be more social with her workmates, while Taub and Chase wonder why Foreman hasn't had a romantic relationship in a while.

== Plot ==
In the middle of devastating a witness on cross-examination, a district attorney goes to the judge to ask for a recess because he thinks he is having a heart attack. The judge calls for an ambulance. Foreman tells House about the case; the patient didn't have a heart attack. House thinks it's an anxiety attack, but Foreman has already ruled it out by lying to the patient to get him to relax. House gets interested.

House calls his team together to do a differential. After they go through the possibilities, House figures it's a toxin and orders tests and an environmental scan. He also tells them to check out the patient's wife because he thinks she may have done it. When Chase complains he doesn't want to do the work alone, House allows him the choice of Taub or Park. Chase and Adams both call dibs on Taub, but Adams “settles” for Park.

Chase and Taub run into Foreman on the elevator and compliment him for lying to the patient to rule out anxiety. However, they are concerned Foreman is misbehaving and tell him to get a girlfriend. Foreman assures them he's just trying to make sure House does his job. Chase tells him that a girlfriend is a better idea than trying to keep track of House. Taub agrees despite his alimony and child support obligations.

Adams and Park are driving to the patient's house. Adams is telling her how wonderful her new car is, but Park thinks she's avoiding talking about why she doesn't want to work with her. Adams assures Park that House's belief that no-one wants to work with her is simply his way of getting under everyone's skin.

The wife is talking to Taub and dismissing the possibility that someone would want to poison her husband. Everyone at work likes him, even the criminals he prosecutes. She says he only eats stuff he brings from home. Taub thinks the patient is afraid of something, but when Chase talks to the patient, he tells Chase that his first job was at the health department and he knows how dirty restaurants can be. Chase asks him if he got any strange packages or letters, but the patient denies it and notes his three kids are healthy and it's unlikely they would not have been exposed to something that made him sick. Chase brings up the possibility of his wife deliberately poisoning him, and the patient dismisses it. The wife tells the same thing to Taub.

Park and Adams are having no luck, and Park wants to run in case someone called the police - they would give a prosecutor's home higher priority. However, as they go to leave, Park notices that the walls of two adjoining rooms are a lot further apart than they should be. Adams thinks she's kidding about there being a secret room, but Park remembers seeing a magnet of the type used to open child-proof cabinets on their refrigerator and tells Adams to get it. Park sees a spot behind the books, applies the magnet, and swings back the bookcase. They call House and tell him that the patient has an arsenal of weapons. When Park and Adams go to confront the patient about the discovery, he explains that he built it in secret to keep the city from finding out. The wife is surprised to find out, and questions why he felt he needed such an arsenal.

Park and Adams go to report to House, who has already figured out what the patient told them - that he was afraid the government was going to collapse. Adams is astounded, but House says that's what everyone with a bunker full of guns is afraid of. Chase thinks it might be a symptom, but Adams and Park get into an argument. House orders tests for everything they've suggested. He returns to clinic duty and picks the most attractive clinic patient to examine.

Park asks Taub who's more paranoid; the patient or her. He replies he doesn't think the patient has a mental illness and tells Park not to let House get to her. However, Park says she doesn't think the team respects her and Chase doesn't even try to hide it. Taub says Chase just likes working with him and does respect her. Foreman interrupts them and asks to speak to Taub.

Foreman asks Taub to stop telling the nurses he‘s looking for a girlfriend. Taub denies it, but Foreman asks why he keeps getting lunch offers and boxes of cupcakes. However, Taub says he's been too busy to even think about talking to nurses. However, Park realizes he's lying and Taub says it's for Foreman's own good.

House tells Wilson the patient is just stupid, but Wilson reminds House he owns a gun. House says that's different - the patient has an arsenal, and House denies owning a gun. Wilson tells him he does and, as a felon, if he's caught with it he could go back to jail. House says he doesn't need a gun, the only thing worth stealing would require a crane to remove it. Wilson is still not convinced. House is very attached to his possessions and likes dangerous things even making fireworks. Wilson pretends to give in, but House realizes he's lying and Wilson admits he is.

All of Adams' and Chase's tests are coming out negative. They start talking about the “feud” and Adams wants to know why Chase didn't pick Park that morning. Chase says Park is weird. Adams counters that Park is a good doctor, but Chase says good doctors can be weird, like House. He admits Adams is weird too, but it's easier to put up with her because she's hot. He backs up and says she's normal and a pleasure to be with. She calls him weird. They start talking about guns. He thinks she likes shooting sport weapons for fun. Chase makes up a story about shooting kangaroos, but Adams realizes he's screwing with her.

The wife is staying with her husband, but he wants her to give her mother a break. She's worried that he thinks the world is coming to an end. He assures her that he hopes he never has to use them. However, Park discovers he's bleeding from a sore on his leg.

The patient has also developed a fever. They decide to do a biopsy of the sore and start treatment for sclerosis. Park goes to ask House why she's calling her an idiot when it's obvious he doesn't really believe that. She says she doesn't mind him making fun of her, but she doesn't like being manipulated. He assures her he's only making fun of her, but she says she deserves some respect. He assures her that people respect her, they just don't like her. The patient's wife has left the hospital and the patient believes it's because he lied to her. He assures the doctors he's not crazy. Chase reassures him.

Foreman and Nurse Regina are arguing about why the paperwork hasn't been entered in the computer when House leaves the clinic early because he got an emergency page. Foreman tells Nurse Regina to find someone who can do the paperwork because he has to leave. House arrives home to find Wilson in a net trap. Wilson sent the emergency page and calls House an ass. House won't let Wilson out of the trap until he admits that House is too clever to let Wilson ever find a gun even if he had one and will always be one step ahead of him.

Foreman is at the gym with a punching bag when he gets a page. When he goes to answer it, a beautiful young woman, Anita, introduces herself and asks him how bad his day was to take it out on the punching bag, but Foreman thinks Taub sent her and threatens to treat him like the punching bag. However, Anita says she doesn't know what he's talking about. Foreman is still suspicious, but Anita says she will be in the gym for a while if he changes his mind. Foreman picks up his phone again. Taub is on the other end telling Foreman the patient is wrecking things and tells him he's got to go.

The patient is put in restraints. He was hallucinating he was being attacked by bears and Adams says that points to clinical paranoia. Adams and Park argue about whether it's new or old paranoia when Chase interrupts to suggest it may just be a mental illness because all the tests are negative. Park still thinks it's a brain infection, but Adams thinks it's autoimmune. House agrees with both Adams, orders treatment for GAD; steroids and immunoglobulin. Park follows House and tells him that she's not paranoid and it's not that her teammates don't like her, they just don't know her that well.

House arrives home again and finds a trip wire that he spots before he actually trips over it. He sees an open closet door. He pulls the wire with his cane. The trap springs harmlessly and Wilson delightedly jumps out of the closet only to have his spirits fall when he sees House standing untrapped. House tosses him and his trap out the door. House returns triumphantly to his apartment, only to lock himself in the bathroom when the doorknob comes off in his hand. He finds the second door locked too. He goes to examine the first door, but the doorknob to that one falls off too. House looks through the hole in his door and sees Wilson on the other side. He concedes defeat.

Foreman goes to Anita's house and they start making out. However, they hear a man call her name and she tells Foreman he has to go right away. As he leaves, she tells him it's her husband. The patient's fever climbs. Park calls House, who is still stuck in his bathroom. Park says that it must be an infection, but Adams says they probably just started treatment for GAD too late. House orders more steroids. Park objects because if it's an infection, the steroids will be fatal. House counters that if it's an infection, they're probably already too late but they can still treat GAD or at least slow its progress. However, Park keeps arguing they can treat an infection. House finally gives in, but tells them ordinary antibiotics would be useless - they need to identify the infection. He orders tests. Adams reminds him that he just ordered more steroids, but House tells her he changed his mind and to follow Park's instructions. Wilson finishes searching House's apartment and admits there's no gun, although he found his own sunglasses, tennis racket and money clip.

Park and Adams are still arguing about the diagnosis. Chase breaks in to say maybe House was right to let them have a fight to settle things. Foreman interrupts again to speak to Taub. Foreman is trying to blame Taub for almost having him get beat up by Anita's husband by screwing with his head. Taub tells Foreman he needs a life so he won't come back to the hospital at midnight just to yell at him. He asks Taub to stay out of his business. Taub still proclaims his innocence. However, when he leaves, he tells Chase that although he got off to a bad start, he's glad Foreman is trying. Chase calls him an idiot and their pagers go off.

They arrive at the patient's room to find him in anaphylactic shock. Chase performs a tracheotomy, but it doesn‘t restore breathing. Taub calls for epinephrine. Nurse Anne tells him they already tried it, but Taub realizes that the blockage must be below the incision and that they have no other option.

They manage to get the patient breathing again, but they realize the anaphylaxis and edema rules out both infection and GAD. Allergy also seems to be ruled out because it wouldn't get worse after admission. House turns back to toxins, but there was no-one with the opportunity to poison the patient on all occasions. However, Park suggests squamous-cell carcinoma. Although it wouldn't cause hallucinations, related paraneoplastic syndrome would. House orders a biopsy.

House finds Wilson in his office. Wilson confronts him with a gun he found in House's apartment. Wilson was sure House would have moved the gun, so he went back after he searched House's apartment the first time. House denies it's a gun, or that something looking like a bullet is a bullet. He says it's a magic prop. Wilson doesn't believe him, but House gives him the gun to shoot him. Wilson refuses, but House goes to shoot Wilson instead. He then shows Wilson the barrel is plugged by sticking a pencil in the barrel half-way. Wilson is confused, and House asks him to admit he found nothing. Wilson admits House has won. When Wilson turns around, House lets the pencil drop all the way into the barrel, showing us the gun is real. House looks at the “gun” and starts thinking.

He goes to see his team and tells Park, and everyone else, they were wrong. It wasn't tracheal edema that blocked his airway, it was a pseudo-membrane growing across the trachea. The patient isn't even paranoid - he was poisoned by a bacterium. House asks for a bronchial scope and warns the patient he won't be able to breathe, but he has to look down his windpipe through the tracheotomy hole. When House tells Park to call the CDC for anti-toxin, she realizes it's diphtheria. They didn't consider it because no one gets it anymore. House realizes the patient hasn't been getting the vaccine for it. Foreman goes to congratulate Taub. He tells Taub he's just been at a meeting about parking.

The patient slowly starts to improve. He cheers up when his wife shows up. However, she tells him she's moved the kids out of the house. She says she doesn't like being lied to and she can't live with all the guns. She says that when he gets out, he can move in with them, but they can't return to their old house. He embraces her.

Foreman is working hard on his paperwork when Nurse Regina comes in. She invites him to a staff get-together, but he says he has too much work to do. She tells him to drop by if he changes his mind. Park sees Adams and Chase in the elevator while leaving work. She invites Chase for a drink. Chase asks her if Taub put her up to it, but she says she's been thinking about it for a while and decided to ask. Chase says it's a bad idea to socialize with colleagues, but Park knows about Cameron. He finally agrees to go out that evening. Foreman is still working. He grabs his phone and tells someone he's changed his mind. House puts his gun back in its box. He then takes his father's sword out to look at it. Foreman meets Anita at the bar.

== Music ==
Music playing at the end of the episode is the song "Waking Life" by Schuyler Fisk.

== Reception ==
The A.V. Club gave this episode a B rating.
