= Blowing the Whistle =

- House episode
- Episode no.: Season 8 Episode 15
- Directed by: Julian Higgins
- Written by: Danny Weiss; Seth Hoffman
- Original air date: April 2, 2012

Guest appearances
- Arlen Escarpeta as Private Brant Macklin; Sharif Atkins as Captain Hayes Macklin

Episode chronology
← Previous "Love Is Blind"	Next → "Gut Check"
- House season 8

"Blowing the Whistle" is the fifteenth episode of the eighth season of House and the 170th overall. It aired on April 2, 2012, on FOX.

== Plot ==
The episode begins with a US Army Captain (Sharif Atkins) from the 1st Infantry Division. His brother (Arlen Escarpeta), who himself is army personnel, has been charged with treason. Foreman informs the team that the patient experienced a generalized tonic–clonic seizure. They find out that the soldier had exposed the details of a US Army blunder ("blown the whistle"). Adams believes that House is losing his observational skills, but the rest of the team believe that nothing is wrong at all.

The team believe that he was faking to get out of military prison and gives a placebo to see if the man is faking symptoms, which he appears to be. They are about to discharge the patient, but then he also presents with 2 more symptoms: bruising on his abdomen and his legs. House and the team come up with various procedures and decide to ultrasound his belly to find any obstructions. Adams tells her theory to Wilson about House, and says that House is suffering from hepatic encephalopathy due to continued Vicodin abuse. Wilson rebukes this idea, but decides to tell House this and House tells Wilson to not be concerned.

The patient tells the team that he got into the Army to find out how his father, also a soldier, actually died. While telling the team this, they notice bleeding from his eyes and hands, blood in his urine, and an enlarged spleen. The team do an emergency operation to release more blood from his spleen but find his spleen to be lumpy. After House makes Taub guess several explanations during the differential diagnosis, he eventually comes up with sarcoidosis. While the differential diagnosis is going on, House and Taub are playing a game and House loses, Adams suggests that this is another example of House's impaired coordination. Park agrees with this, but Chase says that it's ironic that they're talking about a whistle blower while "Blowing the Whistle" on House. The patient decides to announce on live TV why he showed the video tape for which he was found treasonous, and unless he is granted this, he won't accept treatment. Chase, Taub and Foreman suggest his older brother sign a form to be his conservator. House decides to give the patient an offer he can't refuse, so they manage to get the Army to declassify the pages from his father's record. During this, Taub tricks House into providing a stool sample which proves his liver is failing. This then leads to a double differential diagnosis for the patients and for House. House says that their result isn't real. They decide to go straight to Foreman. Chase argues this puts patients at risk due to House being suspended if he rejects treatment.

During treatment, the patient suffers from cyanosis, for which they give him heparin. House sees the patient and asks him if it was worth it to release the tape of the Army releasing a bomb on a supposed insurgent hideout. The patient tells him he couldn't take the thought of the suffering of the innocent civilians who died. He tells House his hair turned grey in three days, after which he shaved off all his hair. House tells the teams it's Graves' disease; the team suggests otherwise but House tells them to treat with anti-thyroids. The team decide against this due to their belief that House is seriously ill and his mental state is off.

The patient tells the team that he's cold, even though he has a temperature of 104. During a differential diagnosis, Foreman tells House and the team that all further treatments have to go through him unless House is deemed cleared of all possible illness. House also believes that the patient is suffering from malaria. The patient rejects treatment based on the fact the notes haven't arrived yet. His brother then asks Taub to draw up the paperwork to deem his brother mentally unstable to have them treat him. Adams and Taub realize that the file did arrive but the brother hid this from the patient. When Taub confronts the brother, he tells the patient that their father drank a lot and died in a car crash, killing himself along with a civilian, but asked his friends to change the file records to state that he died a hero's death.

Even though they start anti-malarial treatment, the patient is still suffering. House also tells the team, during another differential diagnosis, that he was tricking them all along just so he could find out which of the team he could actually trust. While telling them, he leaves after realizing what's wrong with the patient: typhus, which Chase guessed earlier but House dismissed because the patient has no hair. This came from the fact that the Afghan civilian furniture was infested with rat lice. House also tells them that typhus presents with psychiatric problems, so he can fight his case by claiming that he had suffered from disease-related mental instability. He rejects this on the basis that it proves that what he did wasn't the right thing and that going to prison allows him to keep his honor.

Towards the end of the episode, House confronts Wilson about being the rat. Wilson rejects the notion and House then realizes that Chase was the rat. Chase explains that House's motives were to see who has the sharpest mind for when House's mind does actually begin to go.

== Reception ==
The A.V. Club gave this episode a B+ rating, while Lisa Palmer of TV Fanatic gave it a 4.0/5.0 rating.
