= Darlene Vogel =

American actress and former model (born 1962)

- Born: October 25, 1962 (age 64); Modesto, California, U.S.
- Education: Fashion Institute of Technology
- Occupations: Actress, model
- Years active: 1988–present
- Spouse: Mark Howard
- Children: 2

Darlene Vogel (born October 25, 1962 in Modesto, California) is an American actress and former model, best known for her role as Chris Kelly in Pacific Blue (1996–2000).

== Career ==
Vogel's first feature film was the 1989 science fiction film Back to the Future Part II, where she played Leslie "Spike" O'Malley, a member of Griff Tannen's gang in a futuristic 2015, and as Heather, the IFT intern in the pre-show segment for the 1991 film ride Back to the Future: The Ride for the Universal movie parks.

=== Acting roles ===
Vogel has appeared in numerous TV roles, with her best-known role probably being Officer Chris Kelly on the USA Network TV series Pacific Blue from 1996 to 1999. She is also known for her role on the soap opera One Life to Live as Dr. Melanie Farrell McIver from January 2000 to October 2001. Vogel's other films include are Ski School, Angel 4: Undercover, and Ring of Steel. She has made guest appearances on TV shows, including Full House, Farscape, Northern Exposure, Boy Meets World and CSI: Crime Scene Investigation.

== Personal life ==
Vogel and her husband, Mark, have a son and a daughter. An avid animal activist, Vogel and Howard provide a home for three dogs.

Vogel was once engaged to Canadian ice-hockey player Adam Oates. However, the couple cancelled their planned 1998 marriage at the last moment.

== Filmography ==
=== Film ===
Year	Title	Role	Notes
1989	Back to the Future Part II	Leslie "Spike" O'Malley	
1990	Ski School	Lori	
1994	Ring of Steel	Elena Carter	
1994	Angel 4: Undercover	Molly Stewart	
1995	Decoy	Diana Wellington	
1999	Morella	Andrea	
2012	Walking the Halls	Maggie	
2012	It Could Change Everything	Roddi	Short film
2019	Day 13	Lisa	
2019	The Wedding Year	Mother	

=== Television ===
Year	Title	Role	Notes
1988	The Equalizer	Gina	Episode: "Video Games"
1990	Charles in Charge	Valerie	Episode: "Judge Not Lest Ye Beheaded"
1990	Doctor Doctor	Laurel	Episode: "Ch-Ch-Ch-Changes"
1992	Full House	Wendy Tanner	2 episodes
1992	The Hat Squad	Gloria	Episode: "Pilot"
1993	The Return of Ironside	Judy Bernardo	TV film
1993	Coach	Shannon	Episode: "About Face"
1994	Northern Exposure	Meredith Swanson	Episode: "Lovers and Madmen"
1994	Blue Skies	Sarah Johnson	Episode: "The Girl, Bull and the Amenite Hat"
1994–1995	Boy Meets World	Katherine "Kat" Tompkins	4 episodes
1995	Silk Stalkings	Stacy	Episode: "Kill Shot"
1996–2000	Pacific Blue	Officer Chris Kelly	Main role (83 episodes)
1999	Farscape	Alexandra / Lorana	Episode: "Rhapsody in Blue"
2000–2001	One Life to Live	Melanie MacIver	Contract role
2002	CSI: Crime Scene Investigation	Mina Rittle	Episode: "Cross-Jurisdictions"
2006	Capitol Law	Sally	TV film
2006–2009	General Hospital	Claire Lindquist	Recurring role (3 episodes)
2006–2009	Beyond the Break	Patty Farmer	Recurring role (8 episodes)
2007	The Cure	Lynn Carter	TV film
2009	The Forgotten	Sally Benedict	Episode: "Pilot"
2012	House	Ellen Rogers	Episode: "Runaways"
2013	Dirty Teacher	Lauren Hall	TV film
2016	Castle	Sadie Beakman	Episode: "Witness for the Prosecution"
2017	The Ranch	Vicky	Episode: "One of Those Nights"
2019	Dirty John	Liz	Episode #1.7
2019	Smuggling in Suburbia	Georgia	TV film
2019	Animal Cribs	Herself	Episode #2.9

=== Theme parks ===
Year	Title	Role	Notes
1991	Back to the Future: The Ride	Heather	Short film
