= Runaways (House) =

- House episode
- Episode no.: Season 8 Episode 10
- Directed by: Sanford Bookstaver
- Written by: Marqui Jackson
- Original air date: January 30, 2012

Guest appearances
- Bridgit Mendler as Callie Rogers; Yaya DaCosta as Anita; Darlene Vogel as Ellen Rogers; Kai Lennox as George; Brad Carter as Sheldon

Episode chronology
← Previous "Better Half"	Next → "Nobody's Fault"
- House season 8

"Runaways" is the tenth episode from season eight of House and the one-hundred sixty-fifth overall. It originally aired on Fox on January 30, 2012.

A teenage girl Callie/Jane Doe (Bridgit Mendler) needs a surgery requiring adult consent, but claims she is fleeing an abusive household. House and Adams debate whether to call Social Services, but then her mom shows up and it turns out the relationship is far more complicated than the team could have anticipated. Meanwhile, Taub can't connect with his infant daughters and House threatens to exploit Foreman's relationship with a married woman.

The song "Be The Song" by Foy Vance is featured at the end of the episode.

== Plot ==
House is examining a young girl (Callie) in the clinic who is having trouble breathing. House accuses her and the man she's with of being unrelated. She goes to leave, but House tells her that she's bleeding from her ear. House continues his physical examination.

House meets his team and starts a differential. Adams has figured out the patient isn't really 18 and says they have to call social services. House says that the patient will run if social services is called. House decides to treat for pneumococcus, but the team argues that she may have been vaccinated. Adams finds out that she has been vaccinated for pneumococcus. The patient registered under a fake name, but Adams and Park decide to scan the foreclosed house she listed as her address.

When Callie realizes they went to her school she tries to leave the hospital, knowing that social services will come, but she collapses and complains she can't feel her legs. House drags the team to a skeet shooting range for the next differential. Chase comes up with vasculitis and House agrees to steroids. Adams gets back to calling social services and House makes a bet - if she can hit a clay pigeon, she can call. If she misses, she can't raise the issue again. She expertly hits the pigeon.

The social worker arrives but Adams is suspicious - the patient isn't making a fuss and the social worker is wearing five inch heels. Adams wonders if House could have known she was an expert marksman. House hired a prostitute to impersonate a social worker. Foreman explains that House called back and cancelled the real social worker and has arranged another one. Foreman says House should have told him about an underage patient.

House meets the team to start a new differential, as it appears steroids made it worse. House decides on Zollinger-Ellison syndrome and tells them to get consent from the mother to test for it. Adams is opposed as she believes the mother hit Callie. House says that's not relevant unless social services agrees.

Callie says she lied because people understand physical abuse, but not what she went through. Adams asks her to give her mother another chance, but Callie feels her mother will return to drugs when things get bad. Adams and Chase are performing the endoscopy and find an ulcer in the esophagus. Adams thinks it might be alcoholism, but House thinks it is an aneurysm and wants to do surgery.

They discuss the brain surgery with the patient. Callie realizes Adams thinks House is wrong. Adams accuses the patient of being an alcoholic. Callie denies it. She says she wants the surgery, but Taub says it's the mother's decision. Callie assures her mother she's not an addict, but her mother reminds her that's what she always said. Callie snaps back that she's not like her mother and says she wants surgery. House goes to see the mother. He tells her that her daughter hates her and should hate her. He tells the mother to leave. He says he's going ahead with the surgery and will deal with the fallout. However, he leaves his Vicodin. The mother gives him back his pills and tells him to treat her daughter for alcoholism.

They perform emergency surgery, but can't find anything. The blood vessels are all intact. The patient's blood pressure drops. The team start talking about the patient being in Florida and that it might be a tropical infection. House notes those don't wait for years to appear and goes to dismiss the idea when he thinks of something.

House asks the mother if Callie ever went swimming in Florida. The mother says she went swimming in a nearby canal. He asks the mother to follow him into surgery. House reveals she has ascariasis, a parasite. They are generally asymptomatic, but when set off by a small trauma, they attack the body's organs. She is then given mebendazole.

Callie improves rapidly, but runs away while unsupervised. She leaves behind a note, saying that she believes her mother will fall back to her old ways and, not wanting to experience that again, prefers to remember her mother the way she is now.

== Reception ==
The Onion's AV Club gave this episode a B rating.

13th most watched program of the week.
