= Risky Business (House) =

- House episode
- Episode no.: Season 8 Episode 4
- Directed by: Sanford Bookstaver
- Written by: Seth Hoffman
- Original air date: October 31, 2011

Guest appearances
- Michael Nouri as Thad Barton; Alexie Gilmore as Ainsley Barton

Episode chronology
← Previous "Charity Case"	Next → "The Confession"
- House season 8

"Risky Business" is the fourth episode of the eighth season of the American television medical drama series House and the 159th overall episode of the series. It aired on Fox on October 31, 2011.

This episode was watched by 6.65 million viewers, the lowest since episode 3 in season 1, "Occam's Razor".

== Plot ==
A CEO falls mysteriously ill just days before he signs a contract that would relocate his company's entire labor force to China. To restore funding to his department, House attempts to make an underhanded business transaction with his wealthy patient. When the patient's condition worsens, the team must work around the clock to save his life. Park (Charlyne Yi) prepares for her hearing with the Princeton Plainsboro Disciplinary Committee chaired by Foreman (Omar Epps) but it soon becomes clear to her that House's concerns for her future are based solely on the bet he has placed against her. Adams' (Odette Annable) outlook on her patient's business venture reveals her deeper feelings about loyalty. House must again contemplate an important choice – risk going back to prison or letting orthopedics get away with pranking him.

== Reception ==
The A.V. Club gave this episode a C+ rating.
