= The Confession (House) =

- House episode
- Episode no.: Season 8 Episode 5
- Directed by: Kate Woods
- Written by: John C. Kelley
- Original air date: November 7, 2011

Guest appearances
- Jamie Bamber as Bob Harris; Heather Stephens as Denise Harris; Carlie Casey as Beauty Queen Cindy; E. E. Bell as Mayor Collins; Natalie Dye as Sally Harris; Blake Bertrand as David Harris

Episode chronology
← Previous "Risky Business"	Next → "Parents"
- House season 8

"The Confession" is the fifth episode of the eighth season of the American television medical drama series House and the 160th overall episode of the series. It aired on Fox on November 7, 2011. This episode marks Chase and Taub's official return to House's team.

== Plot ==
Jamie Bamber guest stars as Bob Harris who suddenly collapses. While diagnosing his symptoms, the team discovers that he has been hiding dark secrets and lying about his personal and professional life. When he openly confesses his wrongdoings to his family and community, he compromises his chances of receiving the proper medical treatment that could save his life.

In this episode, Taub's babies are mentioned for the first time, and House cannot resist suggesting that they are not really Taub's. House obtains the DNA results that would establish the parentage of Taub's babies, and is surprised when Taub shreds the results because he does not care whether they are biologically his or not.

== Reception ==
The Onion's AV Club gave this episode a B rating. It was watched by 7.55 million viewers.
