= Love Is Blind (House) =

- House episode
- Episode no.: Season 8 Episode 14
- Directed by: Tim Southam
- Written by: John C. Kelley
- Original air date: February 27, 2012

Guest appearances
- Michael B. Jordan as Will Westwood; Margo Harshman as Melissa; Karolina Wydra as Dominika Petrova-House; Diane Baker as Blythe House; Billy Connolly as Thomas Bell

Episode chronology
← Previous "Man of the House"	Next → "Blowing the Whistle"
- House season 8

"Love Is Blind" is the fourteenth episode of the season eight of House and the 169th overall. The episode debuted in Canada on Global on February 27, 2012, but was not aired in the United States on Fox until three weeks later, on March 19, 2012, as a result of the Daytona 500 rain delay of 30 hours that led the event to be broadcast at 7 PM February 27.

== Plot ==
A blind man (Michael B. Jordan) starts suffering from a mysterious illness just before he is about to propose to his girlfriend. As his condition worsens, the team finds a way to save him, but the patient feels that the side effects of the cure would be worse than death as they would make him deaf as well as blind. Meanwhile, House's mother visits the hospital to tell her son some important news. However, House appears to be insistent on avoiding her and a discussion of the past year of his life at all costs. When Wilson thinks she is there because she has terminal cancer, House finally goes to see his mother, but finds her sleeping with Thomas Bell, the man House thought was his biological father due to a birthmark. After the revealing of House's marriage to Dominika and his time spent in prison, Bell seems to take it all in stride. But after House shows evidence that Bell is his biological father, Bell makes it clear that he will not put up with House's behavior any longer. However Wilson, using a DNA sample from the fork Bell used at a restaurant, proves to House that Bell is not his father.

== Reception ==
The Onion's AV Club gave this episode a B rating, while Lisa Palmer of TV Fanatic gave it a 3.5/5.0 rating.
