= John C. Kelley =

American television writer and producer

- Occupations: Television writer, producer
- Years active: 1999–present

John C. Kelley (sometimes credited as John Kelley) is an American television writer and producer who formerly served as a supervising producer on the acclaimed Fox medical drama House (2004–12).

== Career ==
Kelley's career in entertainment began when he wrote and directed a short film entitled The Yellow Badge of Courage in 1999. In 2001 he served as a producer and writer on a television special entitled Earthship.TV, a display of footage from filmmaker James Cameron's expedition to the wreck of the RMS Titanic. From 2003 to 2007 he served as a writer and producer on the CBS crime series NCIS, writing or co-writing sixteen episodes during this time. In 2010 he wrote a freelance episode of House, which aired as part of its sixth season. He was brought aboard as a staff writer at the beginning of season seven.

== Television work ==
=== NCIS episodes ===
- 1.03: "Sea Dog" (with Donald P. Bellisario)
- 1.03: "Marine Down"
- 1.15: "Enigma"
- 1.20: "Missing"
- 2.05: "The Bone Yard"
- 2.09: "Forced Entry" (with Jesse Stern)
- 2.11: "Black Water" (with Juan Carlos Coto)
- 2.15: "Caught on Tape" (with Chris Crowe and Gil Grant)
- 2.23: "Twilight"
- 3.03: "Mind Games" (with Jeffrey Kirkpatrick)
- 3.04: "Silver War" (with Joshua Lurie)
- 4.01: "Shalom" (with Donald Bellisario)
- 4.10: "Smoked" (with Robert Palm)
- 4.11: "Driven" (with Nell Scovell and Richard Arthur)
- 4.15: "Friends and Lovers"
- 4.19: "Grace Period"

=== House episodes ===
- 6.18: "Knight Fall"
- 7.03: "Unwritten"
- 7.14: "Recession Proof"
- 7.17: "Fall from Grace"
- 8.05: "The Confession"
- 8.14: "Love Is Blind"
- 8.19: "The C Word"

=== The Blacklist episodes ===
- 1.05: "The Courier (No. 85)"
