= Unwritten (House) =

- House episode
- Episode no.: Season 7 Episode 3
- Directed by: Greg Yaitanes
- Written by: John C. Kelley
- Original air date: October 4, 2010

Guest appearances
- Cynthia Watros as Dr. Sam Carr; Seidy Lopez as Christina; John Bain as Jack Cannon/Rutherford; Amy Irving as Alice Tanner/Helen Rutherford

Episode chronology
← Previous "Selfish"	Next → "Massage Therapy"
- House season 7

"Unwritten" is the third episode of the seventh season of the American medical drama House. It originally aired on Fox on October 4, 2010.

== Plot ==
When children's author Alice Tanner (Amy Irving) inexplicably suffers from a seizure during a suicide attempt, the Princeton-Plainsboro team must evaluate both her underlying medical conditions, as well as her unstable psychological state. Because of her suicide attempt, House can hold Alice in the hospital under psychiatric hold for 72 hours, but Alice is uncooperative and the team must diagnose her before she is allowed to leave. Meanwhile, House takes Cuddy on a double date with Wilson and his girlfriend, Sam (guest star Cynthia Watros).

When the team gets Alice an MRI, three metal screws are ripped out of her leg by the strong magnetic field. She claims they are from treatment following a skiing accident. House is convinced that the key to unlocking the mysteries of Alice's condition lies in the pages of her most recent novel and suspects that fictional character Helen Rutherford's symptoms are actually Alice's symptoms that she's been writing about in her book. The symptoms all point to lupus, but House is unhappy with the diagnosis as it's not curable and he wants to take her pain away.

Later, House suspects the screw implants were actually from a car accident, and that the seat belt damaged Alice's thyroid glands. Taub suggests a post traumatic syringomyelia that grew over the years and pressed on her spine, causing all her symptoms. When the team can't find her old medical records, Cuddy suggests that Alice Tanner may be a pen-name.

House discovers that her real name is Helen and the books are about her son who died in a car accident. Helen refuses treatment until House lies and tells her that her son died from a brain aneurysm that caused the crash. After being cured, she decides to stop writing the book series but House demands that she write a new ending for the last book with more resolution than the cliffhanger she originally wrote. Helen refuses and House begins to tell her the truth about her son's cause of death, but he sees Cuddy in the doorway and stops.

In the side story, House is worried that his relationship with Cuddy is doomed to failure because they have no interests besides work in common. Cuddy then tells House that she doesn't care that they have nothing in common because commonality is boring. She says that she thinks they make each other better people and that is sufficient.

== Reception ==
=== Critical response ===
Handlen wrote that the episode's greater focus on the patient-of-the-week storyline was "something of a relief" and said Amy Irving was "fine" in her guest role, but criticized the patient storyline as overly obvious and lacking emotional depth.

Zack Handlen of The A.V. Club gave the episode a B− rating.

=== Ratings ===
This episode was watched by 10.78 million American viewers.
