= Body & Soul (House) =

- House episode
- Episode no.: Season 8 Episode 18
- Directed by: Stefan Schwartz
- Written by: Dustin Paddock
- Original air date: April 23, 2012

Guest appearances
- Karolina Wydra as Dominika Petrova-House; Samantha Cutaran as Lida; Riley Lennon Nice as Lue; George Kee Cheung as Xang

Episode chronology
← Previous "We Need the Eggs"	Next → "The C-Word"
- House season 8

"Body & Soul" is the eighteenth episode of the eighth season of House and the 173rd overall. It aired on April 23, 2012, on FOX.

== Plot ==
The team treats a young Hmong-American boy in respiratory distress who is having dreams of a night hag, which makes House think it could lead to a case of SUNDS. His grandfather (George Cheung) is convinced he has been possessed by an evil spirit. House, after hiding from Dominika the fact that she has received her green card and is free to leave him, has to confront his feelings for her and the sudden increased intimacy of their relationship. However, it appears that Dominika may have been keeping things from House as well. Park and Chase start having erotic dreams about each other and those spill out into the dynamic among the team members.

== Reception ==
The A.V. Club gave this episode a C rating, while Lisa Palmer of TV Fanatic gave it a 4.0/5.0 rating.

== See also ==
- Dab
- Sudden unexpected death syndrome
