= Selfish (House) =

- House episode
- Episode no.: Season 7 Episode 2
- Directed by: Dan Attias
- Written by: Eli Attie
- Original air date: September 27, 2010

Guest appearances
- Alyson Stoner as Della; Allan Rich as Sidney; Stephanie Courtney as Claire; Murray Gershenz as Maurice; Cody Saintgnue as Hugo; Dwier Brown as George; Sean Smith as HR Head Ernest

Episode chronology
← Previous "Now What?"	Next → "Unwritten"
- House season 7

"Selfish" is the second episode of the seventh season of the American medical drama House. It aired on Fox on September 27, 2010. House (Hugh Laurie) treats a patient with sickle cell trait, while dealing with the effects of his burgeoning relationship with Lisa Cuddy (Lisa Edelstein) on his work.

== Plot ==
=== The patient ===
The patient of the week is Della Carr, an active and seemingly healthy teenager, who suddenly collapses with heart arrhythmia at a charity function for congenital muscular dystrophy, from which her brother Hugo suffers. At the hospital, she develops further symptoms of kidney failure and bleeding lung, which requires her to have a lung transplant. The donor lung also fails. After a chance conversation with Hugo, and subsequent questioning of Della, House arrives at the diagnosis of sickle cell trait.

=== House and Cuddy ===
This episode marks the first time Cuddy and House go to work after getting together. When House announces to his team and Wilson that he is dating Cuddy, Wilson (Robert Sean Leonard) is disbelieving, Chase (Jesse Spencer) is indifferent, Foreman (Omar Epps) is in favor, whereas Taub (Peter Jacobson) is apprehensive about how the relationship will affect the team's working.

Cuddy and House begin to give in to each other's decisions to avoid unpleasant confrontations. When House realizes this, he avoids Cuddy in the workplace, rather than speak to her about it. Cuddy tries unsuccessfully to appoint someone else as his supervisor, but no one is willing to take on the job.

Things reach a head when House—unable to further back down and risk his patient's life—goes against Cuddy and informs Della's father that she can be saved by her brother's lung and marrow. When the parents decide against the transplant, unwilling to risk Hugo's life, House and Cuddy get into a heated argument about the correct way to proceed. Ultimately, Hugo takes away the decision from them by convincing Della to agree to the transplant. House and Cuddy realize that the argument was the first honest conversation they have had at work, and resolve to be brutally honest with each other henceforth.

=== Clinic patient ===
House begins to voluntarily turn up for clinic duty, and gets involved with a 102-year-old man and his 80-year-old son. Unbeknownst to each other, the father wants his son to let him go and move out to a health care facility, whereas the son feels that the father is too dependent on him, and not ready to let go. Both bribe House to fake test results, and to advise that the father be moved to a facility. House initially does so, but after diagnosing the father with zinc poisoning from too much denture cream use, he returns the money to both of them, and asks them to get couples therapy.

On the side, House shows an uncharacteristic lack of curiosity about Thirteen's (Olivia Wilde) whereabouts, while Chase starts dating four women simultaneously.

== Reception ==
=== Critical response ===
The AV Club gave this episode a B score.

=== Ratings ===
This episode was watched by 10.54 million viewers in America.
