= The C-Word (House) =

- House episode
- Episode no.: Season 8 Episode 19
- Directed by: Hugh Laurie
- Written by: John C. Kelley Marqui Jackson
- Original air date: April 30, 2012

Guest appearances
- Jessica Collins as Dr. Elizabeth Lawson; Chris L. McKenna as Simon Lawson; Rachel Eggleston as Emily Lawson; Art Chudabala as Dr. Michael A. Kondo

Episode chronology
← Previous "Body & Soul"	Next → "Post Mortem"
- House season 8

"The C-Word" is the nineteenth episode of the eighth season of House and the 174th overall. It aired on April 30, 2012, on FOX.

== Plot ==
When the team takes on the case of Emily, a six-year-old girl who has numerous preexisting health problems, they must work with her mother, Elizabeth, a doctor who specializes in her daughter's condition. The team must also deal with the battles raging between Emily's mother and father who have conflicting views on how to handle her health issues. When searching the family's home for clues to Emily's illness, the team realizes that Elizabeth's determination to cure her daughter could be the very thing that is killing her. Meanwhile, House and Wilson deal with Wilson's stage two cancer at House's apartment. Wilson feels that going forward with the more radical treatments first would be the best way to deal with it instead of dying a slow death, and this puts his life in jeopardy.

== Reception ==
The Onion's AV Club gave this episode a B+ rating, while Matt Richenthal of TV Fanatic gave it a 4.4/5.0 rating.
