= Natalie Dreyfuss =

American actress

- Born: Natalie Rachel Dreyfuss
- Occupation: Actress
- Years active: 1989–present
- Father: Lorin Dreyfuss
- Relatives: Richard Dreyfuss (uncle); Ben Dreyfuss (cousin); Emily Dreyfuss (cousin)

Natalie Rachel Dreyfuss is an American actress, who has had guest-starring roles on shows such as Burn Notice and The Shield. She also had a recurring role on the television series, Rita Rocks, The Secret Life of the American Teenager and The Flash.

== Early life and family ==
Dreyfuss is the daughter of Kathy Kann, who works in Hollywood in wardrobe, and actor Lorin Dreyfuss, as well as the niece of actor Richard Dreyfuss and the cousin of actors Ben Dreyfuss and Emily Dreyfuss. Her father's family is Jewish. Dreyfuss has one child.

== Filmography ==
Film
Year	Title	Role	Notes	Ref(s)
2007	National Treasure: Book of Secrets	Angry college girl		
2008	Childless	Katherine		
2012	Excision	Abigail		
2022	A Snapshot of Forever	Jessie Brookes		

Television
Year	Title	Role	Notes	Ref(s)
2007	Burn Notice	Sophie Stagner	Episode: "Fight or Flight"	
2007	Life	Tiffany Sloan	Episode: "Tear Asunder"	
2008–09	Rita Rocks	Hallie Clemens	Main role	
2008	The Nanny Express	Emily Chandler	Television film	
2008	The Shield	Agnes Billings	Episode: "Moving Day"	
2010	Lie to Me	Molly	Episode: "Darkness and Light"	
2010–11	Glory Daze	Julie	Recurring role	
2012	House	Courtney	Episode: "Holding On"	
2012–13	The Secret Life of the American Teenager	Chloe	Recurring role	
2013	True Blood	Braelyn Bellefleur	2 episodes	
2013	We Are Men	Lizzy	Episode: "We Are Carpe Pontiac"	
2014–15	The Originals	Cassie / Esther Mikaelson	Recurring role	
2014	2 Broke Girls	Hilary Waldare	Episode: "And the DJ Face"	
2019	The Dating List	Abby Morel	Television film	
2021	Fixing Up Christmas	Holly	Television film	
2020–2023	The Flash	Sue Dearbon	Recurring role; 12 episodes	

Web
Year	Title	Role	Notes	Ref(s)
2013	Aim High	Dakota	10 episodes	

Music videos
Year	Title	Artist	Ref(s)
2009	"Kristy, Are You Doing Okay?"	The Offspring	
