= Julie McNiven =

American actress and singer (born 1980)

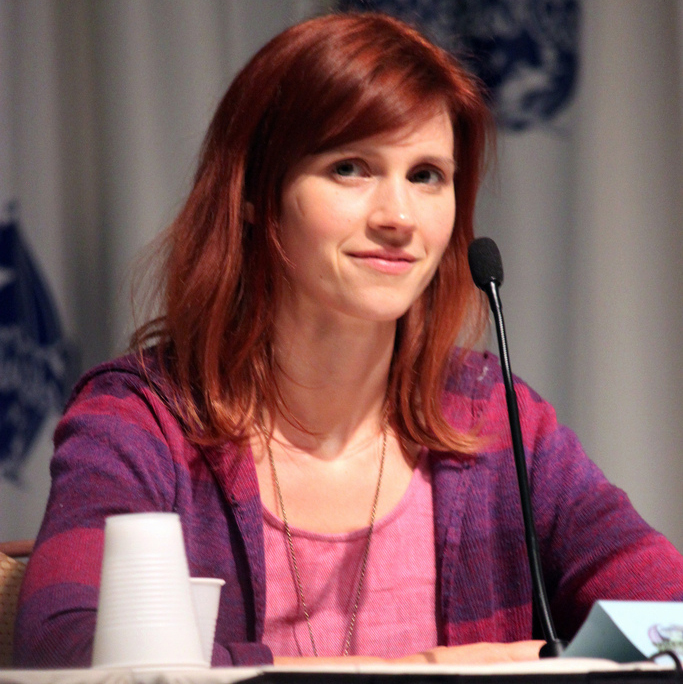
- McNiven at the 2011 DragonCon
- Born: Julie Elizabeth McNiven; October 11, 1980 (age 45); Amherst, Massachusetts, U.S.
- Education: Salem State University
- Occupations: Actress, singer
- Years active: 1997–present
- Spouse: Michael Blackman Beck (m. 2010)
- Children: 2

Julie McNiven (born October 11, 1980) is an American actress and singer. McNiven was born in Amherst, Massachusetts, and got her start in local community theatre productions. She is best known for her recurring roles in Mad Men (2007–2009) and Supernatural (2008–2010). McNiven also had a recurring role in the second season of Stargate: Universe (2010–2011).

== Life and career ==
McNiven studied swinging trapeze as a teenager at French Woods Festival of the Performing Arts. She also attended the summer program at Circle in the Square. She is a graduate of Salem State University (Salem, Massachusetts).

== Personal life ==
In 2010, McNiven married Michael Blackman Beck, with whom she has two sons, Tasman Scott Beck born December 2014 and Jetson born August 2021.

== Filmography ==
=== Film ===
Year	Title	Role	Notes
2005	Dangerous Crosswinds	Sue Barrett	
2006	Doses of Roger	Anna	Short film
2007	Go Go Tales	Madison	
2008	Bluff Point	Girl	Short film
2009	The Cave Movie	Julie	
2010	Failing Better Now	Anna	
2010	Office Politics	Tess	Short film
2010	Sodales	Mom	Short film
2012	Coffees	Jessica	Short film
2012	Soylent	Shelley	Short film
2013	The Caterpillar's Kimono	Helen	
2013	Screwed	Emma	
2014	The Possession of Michael King	Beth King	
2016	Injection	Claudia Fischer	Short film
2017	The Babymoon	Hanna	
2018	The Neighbourhood Nightmare	Lindsay Porter	TV movie
2018	A Christmas Arrangement	Natalie	Post Production
2020	Black Hearted Killer	Juley	TV movie
2020	A Date by Christmas Eve	Blythe Freeman	TV movie

=== Television ===
2006	Waterfront	Tiffany	Episode: "Sting Like a Butterfly"
2006	Law & Order: Criminal Intent	Suzie Walker	Episode: "Weeping Willow"
2007–2009	Mad Men	Hildy	Recurring role (20 episodes)
2008–2010	Supernatural	Anna Milton	Recurring role (6 episodes)
2009	Desperate Housewives	Emily Portsmith	Episodes: "The Coffee Cup", "Would I Think of Suicide?"
2010–2011	Stargate Universe	Ginn	Recurring role (8 episodes)
2011	Fringe	Mona Foster	Episode: "Immortality"
2011	L.A. Noire	Ruth Douglas (voice)	Video game
2011	Nikita	Alicia	Episode: "Falling Ash"
2011	House	Mickey Darro	Episode: "Dead & Buried"
2012	Book Club	Aubrey	Regular role (7 episodes)
2012	Hawaii Five-0	Jenny Burgess	Episode: "Lana I Ka Moana"
2012	NCIS	Kim Taylor	Episode: "The Namesake"
2014	Motive	Meredith Taylor	Episode: "Overboard"
2015	Rizzoli & Isles	Renee Levinson	Episode: "Gumshoe"
2015	The Night Shift	Marcus's Mother	Episode: "Parenthood"
2016	Code Black	Rose	Episode: "Life and Limb"
2016	Internity	Dr.Sara Cohen	Episode: "Pilot"
2017	NCIS: Los Angeles	Lynn Stiger	Episode: "Assets"
2019	Doom Patrol	Sheryl Trainor	Recurring role (6 episodes)
2020	Gods of Medicine	Sarah Foster	Guest role (2 episodes)
