= Dead & Buried (House) =

- House episode
- Episode no.: Season 8 Episode 7
- Directed by: Miguel Sapochnik
- Written by: David Hoselton
- Original air date: November 21, 2011

Guest appearances
- Channon Roe as Emory Lemayne; Madison Davenport as Iris; Julie McNiven as Mickey Darro; Sarah Aldrich as Faye; Robert Pine as Mickey's father; David Wells as Milton; Alex Quijano as Ray Darro

Episode chronology
← Previous "Parents"	Next → "Perils of Paranoia"
- House season 8

"Dead & Buried" is the seventh episode of the eighth season of the American television medical drama series House and the 162nd overall episode of the series. It aired on Fox in the United States on November 21, 2011.

== Synopsis ==
A 14-year-old patient is admitted with what appears to just be severe teenage angst, but the team grows concerned over her increasingly worsening symptoms. However, despite Foreman's objections, House is instead obsessed with solving the case of a deceased four-year-old, landing in serious trouble. Meanwhile, Park tries to get Chase to admit the reason behind his recent obsession with grooming.

== Plot ==
House and most of his team are discussing a case when Foreman comes in with another case. He tells House the patient presented with idiopathic anaphylactic shock and it has stumped three doctors. However, House tells Foreman the case he's working on started with an asymptomatic patient whose kidneys were fried within a year but stumped four doctors, including a department chair from Harvard Medical School. They go back and forth until House says his patient is four and consistently at death's door. Foreman concedes and goes to leave when Adams lets it slip that House's patient has been dead for five years. Foreman gives House the file. After Foreman leaves, Taub notes that if House sticks with the dead boy, not only is the living patient likely to die, but House will be going back to jail and his team will be fired. House hands Taub the file for the live patient and walks off with the file for the dead one. The team starts discussing the case when Chase comes back from the dentist. Park is looking for a new dentist and asks Chase who he saw, but Chase just comes up with a generic last name and Park wonders why he can't remember the name of the dentist he just saw. Chase tries to alibi himself, but Park notices he has a fresh manicure and wonders why he lied about going to the dentist. He says he lied to avoid talking to his colleagues about where he was. Taub and Adams try to do a differential, but Park wants to know why Chase is embarrassed about having had a manicure when he's the type of guy who gets his hair cut frequently and obviously doesn't mind people knowing his grooming habits. Chase cuts Park short by suggesting they do more comprehensive drug tests and getting the patient's mother out of the room before they ask her about drugs again.

Adams asks the patient, Iris, but she denies any drug use. Adams starts doing a medical history. However, Taub talks to the patient's mother, who admits because Iris is so moody, she gives her diazepam and tells her it's Vitamin C. Taub realizes diazepam explains all the patient's symptoms. He reassures the mother all they have to do is keep her off the drugs and she will be fine. However, Iris starts vomiting. Taub realizes they're probably wrong about the diazepam.

House goes to see Wilson for help with the dead boy's case, but Wilson tells him that if Foreman finds out, he will send House back to jail. Wilson starts to think House wants to go back to jail to get away from his own self-destructive habits, but House dismisses the suggestion. House starts throwing out suggestions, but Wilson deflects by talking about old movies. All of a sudden, House shouts out “damn” and tells Wilson he's late for his anger management class.

House is at group therapy, but he's really there to make a connection with the dead boy's father, who is in the same group. He starts suggesting possible symptoms they missed, but the father denies the boy ever had such symptoms.

After the session, House approaches the father to say he needs to have the boy exhumed. The father dismisses the idea because the mother, his ex-wife, would never agree to it. However, House talks to him about how hard it is not to have an answer. The father does tell House where the child was interred.

Iris shows some sensitivity in her abdomen and breasts. She admits her periods haven't been regular. Taub suggests a pregnancy test, but the patient says she has never had sex. Adams goes to touch her arm to reassure her they only need a drop of blood to test, but the patient complains she can't feel her arms anymore.

House goes to the cemetery and bribes the caretaker. Luckily, the child was interred in a sarcophagus. However, House panics when his cell phone goes off when he's in the crypt. It's Adams telling him Iris is pregnant. As he does a differential with his team, he opens the sarcophagus. He's also realized Chase has recently arrived and has no idea what they're talking about. Park notices Chase has just had his eyebrows waxed and House realizes Chase has also had a Brazilian wax. Chase says he has a new girlfriend. House examines the dead boy and finds no obvious abnormalities. Chase suggests the patient may have a complication of HIV. House orders tests to confirm as well as an MRI to rule out tumors. House returns to the dead boy and examines his fingers.

Iris tests negative for HIV, so the team goes to look for a tumor. Adams asks Chase about his waxing and he says there's nothing more profound than him being vain and shallow. The MRI is negative for tumors. When they return to the patient, the numbness in her arms is gone, but they are covered in bruises.

House returns to the hospital and his team updates him. House orders Taub and Chase to do an environmental scan and Adams and Park to run tests. Foreman asks House where he's been. House tells him that he should check with the monitoring company. Foreman says he already did, but the signal was interrupted during a test run during the same time House was out of the hospital. House says if he had known, he would have gone hang gliding. Foreman warns him that if he catches him, it won't just be extra clinic duty; he will have his parole revoked.

House tells Wilson he thinks the dead boy had heavy metal poisoning. Wilson tells him he's addicted to puzzles.

House goes back to the anger management group, which he's moved to a new location, and gets the father to come with him to the “washroom”. However, the new location is right next to the dead boy's old home. House starts an environmental scan.

The environmental scan starts ruling things out and Taub tells Chase he knows he's lying about the Brazilian wax because Taub has had one and it hurts more than “a bit”. Chase admits he wanted to look good because he's appearing on a television segment. Taub wants to know when it's on, but Chase said it aired two hours ago, and he just wanted to distract everyone long enough to keep them from finding out. Chase finally finds a hidden panel in the patient's room with love letters and very hard-core pornography.

House and the dead boy's father go into his old house. House starts collecting samples. The dead boy's father starts drinking. The father finds one box containing his son's remaining possessions. House notes they have lead paint. They hear someone coming and leave.

Iris starts talking about her boyfriend. She still denies having had sex and says the pornography is the boyfriend's. The mother is angry. Finally, Iris tells them her boyfriend was there last night and told her she should leave, but she didn't want to. The boyfriend hit her, which explained the bruises they found. When the mother goes to call the police, Iris says she will deny everything. All of a sudden, her vision becomes fuzzy.

House takes the dead boy's father back to his apartment to run tests for heavy metals. However, they're all negative. The father starts telling House about how his son used to mispronounce words. House asks the father how the mother managed to get through it without getting angry and miserable too. The father says the mother acts like it never happened - she never even cried.

Wilson catches up to Foreman and ask why he cares if House works two cases. Foreman tells him it won't stop there. Wilson warns Foreman that House won't drop it, but Foreman says that given the choice of returning to prison, House will eventually back down.

Iris's vision improved to normal during her eye exam. The team comes to discuss the case, but Taub and House are watching Chase's television appearance playing a stereotypically Australian doctor. House orders an MRA for TIA and heads down to the clinic even though he doesn't have clinic duty.

Drew's mother is down in the clinic, ostensibly for a free flu shot, when House asks why she didn't feel any emotion over her dead son. He starts insulting her over her lack of emotion and she slaps him. House said he deserved the slap, but was hoping she wasn't capable of such an emotional response because it would indicate hereditary hyperthyroidism. The mother realizes House knows the father and says that the father is obsessed with re-living the event. She says that when the boy died, the father was overwhelmed and she vowed that wouldn't happen to her. However, she left him because his eyes reminded her too much of their son. All of a sudden, House asks who used to babysit the boy. She says it was her father, but her father is too emotional about it too and she tells House to leave him alone.

However, House has thought about how people can have multiple sides to their personality. He goes to tell Iris that he found her boyfriend and he ran away and was hit by a car. Iris tells him he's lying. House asks how she knows. She starts swearing at House says it's because “I‘m right here”. House realizes the patient has dissociative identity disorder.

They explain the disorder to Iris and her mother. The doctors believe it was triggered by the auto accident she was in when she was two. It appears the bruises were self-inflicted, and she probably just had sex without remembering it. The diazepam the mother gave her masked the illness, but removing it made it more apparent. The mother admits giving her diazepam for what she thought were “moods”. Chase tells Iris they have to separate her physiological symptoms from her psychological ones, which means getting in touch with all her personalities. She will need hypnosis.

Wilson warns House that if he keeps going like this, once he screws up Foreman may get fired, but House will be going back to prison. House agrees to back down.

House starts thinking. Finally, he comes up with an idea. He lies to the monitoring company about getting a flat tire on the way to a chiropractor appointment and goes to the grandfather's house. He pretends to be from the coroner's office. House asks questions about what they did together but the grandfather tells him they just spent most of their time watching television. However, at that point, the mother and her new husband come in and the husband punches House.

Chase does the hypnosis and finds a little girl personality who can't move her arms and feels pain when she eats strawberries or thinks about the accident she was in when she was two years old. She blamed herself for the accident because she was crying and distracted her father before the crash. Her mother embraces her and they notice the patient is bleeding severely from her groin.

They plot the symptoms of each personality on the whiteboard. The bleeding wasn't from a miscarriage and she still tests positive for pregnancy. They start thinking preeclampsia or ectopic pregnancy and realize they have to do an ultrasound. However, when they do the ultrasound, they can't find an embryo. House thinks they screwed up the pregnancy test, but three different team members did three different positive tests. House realizes that the test only measures elevated HCG levels, which usually only occur when there is a pregnancy, but can also be caused by a choriocarcinoma, which explains the obvious physical symptoms. It's probably hidden which is why it didn't appear on ultrasound. House tells them to tell the patient about her cancer.

House goes to the lounge and finds Wilson, who realizes how he got the black eye. House says he's ruled out several possibilities, and Wilson warns him that he and Foreman are about to collide and it will be massive. Wilson says he's not listening and House says he's being juvenile. Wilson realizes that he's kept talking even though he should have known House would never listen. However, a statement about “deaf ears” makes House think of something.

House goes to the dead boy's mother's house. She sees him outside with her new son. She goes to confront him and finds her ex-husband is there as well. House tells her that Drew died of Alport syndrome. She says she doesn't care. Her husband comes to confront him too, but House keeps yelling at her that it's genetic. Both she and her father have the gene - he's noticed the father is slightly deaf, a symptom that characterizes the condition. It's likely her son has it too. She accuses him of lying. He points out that both of her sons have trouble hearing high pitched sounds, which is why it seemed that her dead son was having trouble pronouncing words. Her current son has the same problem, but the disease is treatable. The police arrive to take House away. The mother starts crying and tells her ex-husband that she misses their son too.

They start Iris on chemotherapy, and she starts to improve.

House is waiting in Foreman's outer office. Foreman is in his office with Wilson. Foreman was sure that since Cuddy's threats of extra clinic duty always got House in line that the threat of jail would too. Wilson says that's a perfectly rational belief. Foreman tells Wilson he has to send House back to jail. Wilson reminds him that House saved two lives. Foreman says it's too late to back down from his threat - if he backs down, House will realize he can get away with anything. Wilson tells Foreman his job is to keep the hospital running. Cuddy did that by managing House and tells Foreman that House can be managed, but he can't be controlled.

Foreman comes out to see House. He asks what Cuddy would have done. House says she would have assigned ten more clinic hours. Foreman tells House Cuddy isn't there anymore and he can do thirty extra hours.

== Reception ==
The A.V. Club gave this episode a C+ rating.

IGN praised this episode for showing more compassion for the character than snark.
