= Sara Hess =

American television producer and writer

- Occupations: Screenwriter, television producer
- Years active: 2005–present

Sara Hess is a television writer and producer. She has worked in both capacities on the drama series House and Orange Is the New Black.

== Career ==
Hess joined the crew of the HBO western drama Deadwood as a writer for the second season in 2005. She wrote the episode "Advances, None Miraculous".

From 2005 to 2012, Hess worked on the medical drama series House, for which she wrote 17 episodes.

Since 2013, she worked on Orange Is the New Black. Starting in 2021, she began working on House of the Dragon, and signed an HBO overall deal. Three of her episodes for House of the Dragon have received significant critical acclaim: Rhaenyra the Cruel, Queen's Landing and Rhaenyra Triumphant.

== Personal life ==
Hess is openly gay, and married writer Talia Osteen in 2014, with whom she has a son.

== Filmography ==
- Deadwood (Writer)
  - Advances, None Miraculous (S2E10)
- House (Supervising producer, co-producer, producer, writer)
  - Spin (S2E6)
  - Sleeping Dogs Lie
  - Finding Judas
  - Act Your Age
  - You Don't Want To Know
  - Living the Dream
  - Lucky Thirteen
  - The Greater Good (S5E14)
  - Epic Fail
  - The Down Low
  - Open and Shut (S6E19)
  - Larger Than Life
  - Bombshells
  - The Dig
  - Charity Case
  - Man of the House
  - We Need the Eggs
- Orange Is the New Black (Co-executive producer, executive producer, writer)
  - Blood Donut (S1E7)
  - Fool Me Once (S1E12)
  - Comic Sans (S2E7)
  - It Was The Change (S2E12)
  - Ching Chong Chang (S3E6)
  - Don't Make Me Come Back There (S3E12)
  - Power Suit (S4E2)
  - Turn Table Turn (S4E9)
- House of the Dragon (Executive producer, writer)
  - The Princess and the Queen
  - The Green Council
  - Rhaenyra the Cruel
  - The Queen Who Ever Was
  - Queen's Landing
  - Rhaenyra Triumphant
