= Persistent stapedial artery =

Blood vessel anomaly

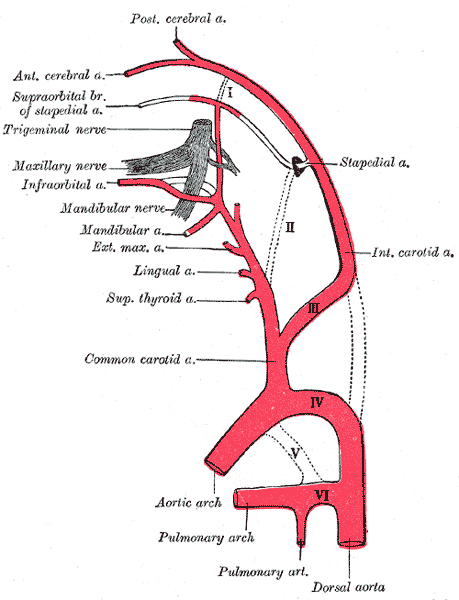
- The main branches of the carotid arteries, the stapedial artery is visible in the top right in grey.
- Specialty: Otolaryngology, angiology
- Symptoms: Pulsatile tinnitus, conductive hearing loss
- Usual onset: From birth
- Diagnostic method: CT scan, angiography, radiography
- Treatment: Coagulation, hearing aids
- Frequency: Extremely rare

A persistent stapedial artery (PSA) is a rare anomaly in human anatomy where the stapedial branch of posterior auricular artery, or simply stapedial artery, remains within the ear of a fetus after the first ten weeks of pregnancy. Whilst not problematic for the majority of people with the anomaly, it can cause difficulties with hearing.

== Signs and symptoms ==
Most cases of PSA cases remain asymptomatic for a person's life; however, symptoms can include vertigo, pulsatile tinnitus, conductive hearing loss or sensorineural hearing loss via bone erosion of the otic capsule in rare cases. Hearing loss in children can also cause developmental delays.

== Cause ==
During pregnancy, the stapedial artery originates as a branch of the caroticotympanic artery in the dorsal branch of the second aortic arch, which is in turn connected to the internal carotid artery. The stapedial artery after passing through the stapes splits into two vessels, the supraorbital branch (future superior tympanic artery) and the maxillomandibular branch (future anterior tympanic artery), the latter of which has a smaller mandibular branch. The former later anastomoses with the ophthalmic artery and becomes the middle meningeal artery, the latter anastomoses with the internal maxillary branch of the external carotid artery, becoming the inferior alveolar artery and infraorbital artery, respectively.

== Diagnosis ==
Since most cases of PSA do not present with symptoms, it is usually discovered incidentally upon middle ear surgery, or during postmortem temporal bone dissections. The absence of the foramen spinosum is sometimes associated with a PSA, although the prevalence of a missing foramen spinosum is much higher than the prevalence of a PSA. On the other hand, a foramen spinosum may be present if the maxillomandibular artery originates from the stapedial artery. A differential diagnosis can help eliminate other possible conditions such as glomus tumour of the tympanicum, facial nerve schwannoma, and aberrant internal carotid artery (ICA) based on results of high-resolution computed tomograms, angiograms, or magnetic resonance angiograms. An aberrant ICA refers to when agenesis of the cervical portion of the ICA occurs, causing the inferior tympanic artery to anastomose with the caroticotympanic artery. This causes the internal carotid artery to enter the middle ear through the same canal as the tympanic nerve, rather than the normal carotid canal. Aberrant internal carotid arteries are often found alongside a PSA, although both anomalies can occur independent of each other.

== Treatment ==
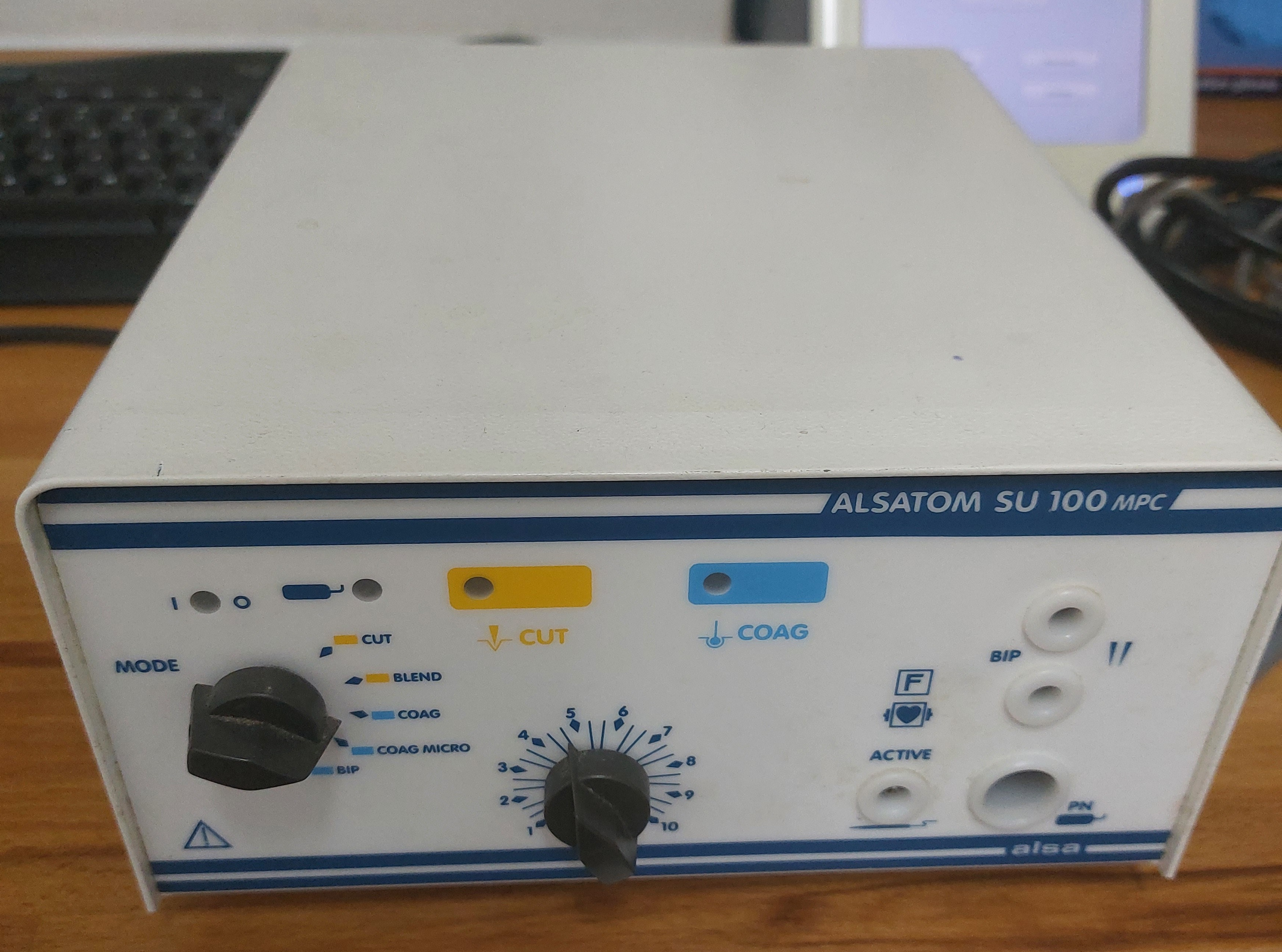
An electrocoagulation machine

Treatment of PSA usually involves some form of coagulation, either laser coagulation or electrocoagulation. Palliative care such as the installation of hearing aids can help resolve hearing loss caused by a PSA; conversely, the PSA may prevent the insertion of cochlear implants meant to alleviate the hearing loss. Ablation of the PSA is also an option, although this treatment carries the risk of potential facial nerve damage and haemorrhage.

The central hospital of the University of Porto reported in 2016 the first successful implementation of a bone-anchored hearing aid in an 8-year-old patient without complications, successfully resolving their hearing loss. Further successful insertions of cochlear implants to resolve hearing loss have also been reported.

== Epidemiology ==
The prevalence of persistent stapedial arteries is thought to be somewhere between 0.02 and 0.48% of the general population; (Note: 0.02% by incidence during surgery, 0.48% histopathologically.) a study in the American Journal of Radiology in 2000 stated that only fifty-six cases of PSA had been reported since the first report of PSA was published in 1836 by Austrian anatomist Josef Hyrtl.
