= David Hoselton =

Canadian screenwriter and television producer

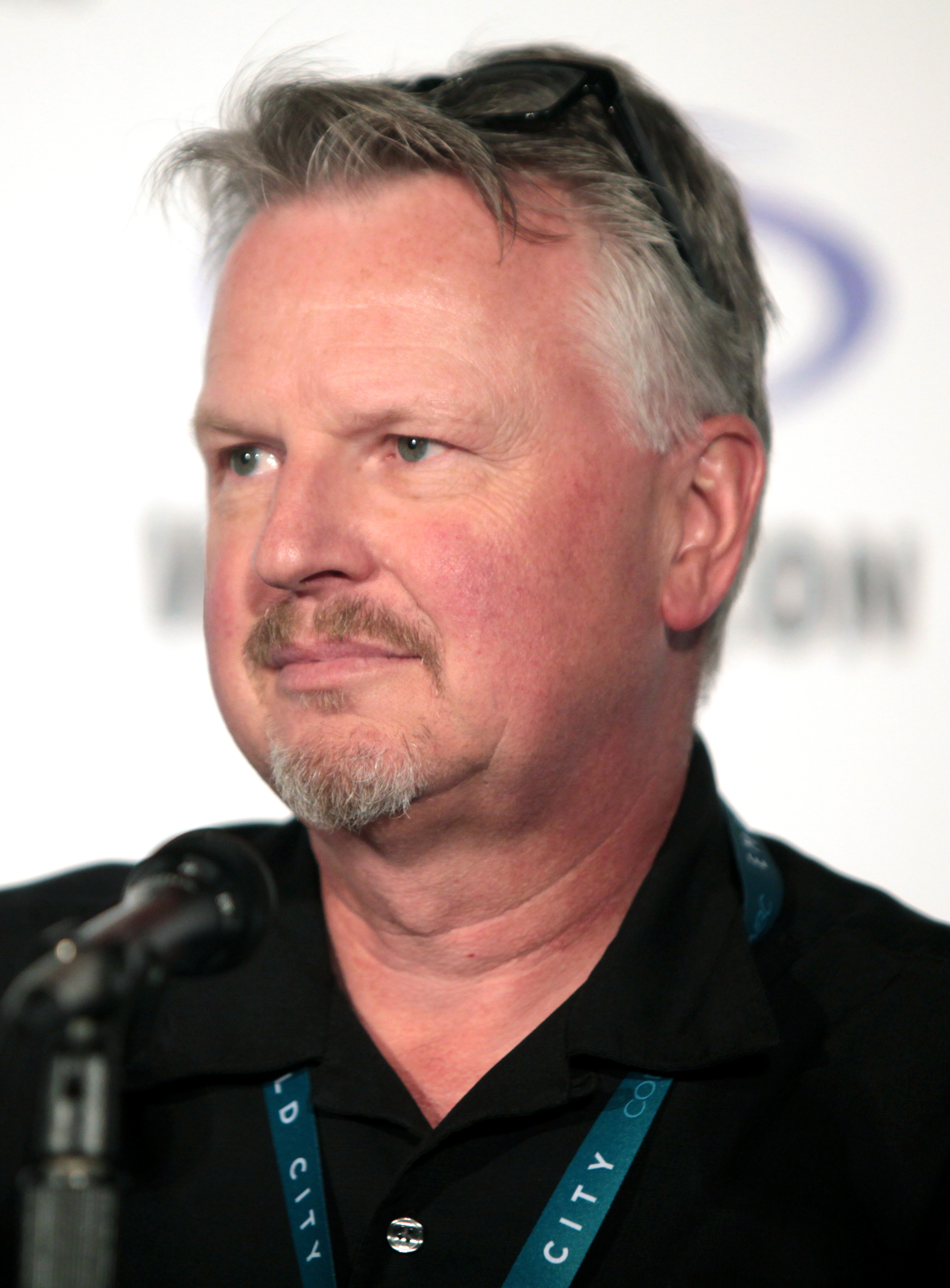
- Born: David Hoselton; Mapleton, Ontario, Canada
- Occupations: Screenwriter, television producer
- Years active: 1987—present

David Hoselton is a Canadian screenwriter and television producer, best known for his work on the television series House and the animated films Over the Hedge and Brother Bear.

== Biography ==
Hoselton attended the University of Toronto Law School where he met and befriended David Shore, the creator of House. Hoselton began his Hollywood career in 1987, as a writer for the film Like Father Like Son, and wrote or co-wrote several other films. In 2006, during the third season of House, Shore hired Hoselton as a writer for the show, and he stayed with the show for the next six seasons, until the end of its run. At the beginning of season four, Hoselton became one of the show's producers. After House, in 2012–13, Hoselton moved to CSI:NY for its final season, as Co-EP, writing two episodes. The following year he joined Chicago PD for its premiere season, again as Co-EP and writing 2 episodes. In 2015–16, he co-created Houdini&Doyle (with David Titcher), a Canadian-UK co-pro, produced By David Shore. Hoselton also served as showrunner and wrote three episodes. In 2016-17 he joined the premiere season of Bull for CBS, as Co-EP, with writing credits on three episodes. In 2017, he rejoined Shore for the premiere season of The Good Doctor, as Co-EP. In the first season, Hoselton was credited on three episodes. He is currently on the second season and has been credited on another three episodes.

== Filmography ==
=== Film ===
Year	Title	Writer	Producer	Notes
1987	Like Father Like Son	Yes	No	
2003	Brother Bear	Yes	No	
2006	Over the Hedge	Yes	No	
