= David Straiton =

American television director

- Occupation: Director
- Years active: 1996–present

David Straiton is a Canadian television director.

== Career ==
His directorial debut was a special of the Nickelodeon series Weinerville. Some of his other television credits include: The Secret World of Alex Mack, Dark Angel, Fastlane, The Immortal, Jake 2.0, Heroes, Dollhouse, Star Trek: Enterprise, Standoff, Life, Charmed, Sex, Love & Secrets, House M.D., Mercy, Detroit 1-8-7, Angel, Las Vegas, Defying Gravity, Chaos, The Cape, White Collar, Nikita, The Firm, The Finder, Fringe, Bates Motel, Agents of S.H.I.E.L.D., Magnum P.I., MacGyver, Stargirl and The Good Doctor.
