= Liz Friedman =

American television producer and writer

Liz Friedman is an American television producer and television writer known especially for her work on Xena: Warrior Princess, Young Hercules, House, and Jessica Jones. In 2014, she was nominated for an Emmy for Outstanding Writing for a Comedy Series for co-writing the pilot episode of Netflix original series Orange Is the New Black.

== Career ==
She wrote and produced episodes of Xena: Warrior Princess, early in her writing career. Friedman was co-creator, writer, and executive producer of Young Hercules. Soon after, she along with fellow House writers, Lawrence Kaplow, Leonard Dick, and Thomas L. Moran wrote episodes for Hack. She wrote for The O.C. and Numbers before joining the writing staff of House in Season 2.

Friedman graduated from the Winsor School in Boston, followed by Wesleyan University with a degree in sociology. Her thesis was entitled "A Feminist and Class-based Analysis of Slasher Films".

She also co-wrote the pilot episode of Netflix original series Orange Is the New Black with the creator of the show, Jenji Kohan. The two were nominated for an Emmy for Outstanding Writing for a Comedy Series for the episode in 2014. Friedman also worked on the Netflix series Jessica Jones, which has been critically acclaimed after its first season 13 episodes, released in 2015.

She worked as an executive producer for The Good Doctor.

== Version by Hudson Leick ==
Liz Friedman was portrayed by the actress Hudson Leick (most famous for playing Callisto) on two episodes of the TV series Hercules: The Legendary Journeys – "Yes, Virginia, There Is a Hercules" and "For Those of You Just Joining Us". Leick portrayed an over-the-top, chain-smoking version of Liz Friedman who was the cynical voice of reason amongst the producers.

== Personal life ==
She is married to Yvette Abatte.
