= Peter Blake (writer) =

American lawyer, screenwriter and television producer

- Occupations: Screenwriter, television producer, lawyer, executive producer
- Spouse: Jennifer Goyne

Peter Blake is an American lawyer, screenwriter and television producer for such shows as The Practice and House, MD.

== Early life ==
Blake, the grandson and nephew, respectively, of the writers Phyllis McGinley and Julie Hayden, was raised in New York City and attended The Collegiate School. He attended Harvard University, where he majored in history and literature and later returned to earn his J.D. degree from Harvard Law School.

After graduating from Harvard Law in 1995, Blake worked briefly as a lawyer and then as a management consultant before moving to Los Angeles to work in the entertainment industry. After spending several years working as a feature film development executive, Blake started writing for TV.

== Screenwriting career ==
Blake wrote for the legal drama The Practice from 2000 to 2004. He was nominated for two Edgar Awards from the Mystery Writers of America for his teleplays and won in 2004 for the episode "Goodbye".

From 2004 to 2012, Blake was a writer and eventually Executive Producer for the Fox TV series House, MD. He was nominated for three Primetime Emmys for producing House. He won the PEN/USA award for best teleplay for the episode "The Tyrant", was nominated for a Humanitas Award for the episode "Everybody Dies" and was nominated for both the Humanitas and the Writers' Guild Award for the episode "Help Me".

Blake wrote for the first season of CBS's Elementary, where he was nominated for an Edgar Award for the episode "Child Predator". Blake and his House colleague, Russel Friend, wrote and directed "The Waindow" episode of the web series Wainy Days. He has also written for the series Billions and Gotham, and consulted on ZeroZeroZero.

Blake created the Mexican series El Candidato which premiered on Amazon Prime in July 2020.

== Personal life ==
Blake is married to producer Jennifer Goyne and lives in Los Angeles.
