= Greg Yaitanes =

American director

- Born: Gregory Charles Yaitanes; June 18, 1970 (age 55); Wellesley, Massachusetts, U.S.
- Occupations: Television director, film director
- Awards: 2008 Primetime Emmy Award for Outstanding Directing – Drama Series

Gregory Charles Yaitanes (born June 18, 1970) is an American television and film director. He is also an angel investor in Twitter.

== Early life ==
Yaitanes grew up in Wellesley, Massachusetts. At the age of 18, Yaitanes moved to Los Angeles and attended the University of Southern California Film School. By 23, he landed his first directorial job.

== Career ==
Greg Yaitanes is an Emmy and Golden Globe-winning director and producer, known for his visionary approach to storytelling and technical expertise. He recently executive produced and directed Presumed Innocent for Apple TV+, which became the platform's most-viewed drama. Yaitanes also directed the critically acclaimed season finale of House of the Dragon, which broke viewership records for HBO and won Best Drama Series at the 2023 Golden Globes. Yaitanes’ other projects include Your Friends and Neighbors and the series Spider-Noir.

Throughout his career, Yaitanes has served as executive producer, director, and showrunner for high-profile series such as Castle Rock, Manhunt: Unabomber, Banshee, and Quarry. His directorial work on House earned him a Primetime Emmy Award in 2008. With over 30 years in the industry, Greg has garnered 29 Emmy nominations and six wins.

In addition to his success in television, Yaitanes is a respected investor in Silicon Valley, having backed companies such as Twitter, Square, and Pinterest. He frequently speaks about the intersection of technology and storytelling, offering insight into his creative process and passion for efficiency.

== Personal life ==
Yaitanes resides in Los Angeles with his three kids, Van, Leo, and Electra, and his wife, Eve.
