= House season 7 =

House
- Season 7
- DVD cover art
- Starring: Hugh Laurie; Lisa Edelstein; Omar Epps; Robert Sean Leonard; Jesse Spencer; Peter Jacobson; Olivia Wilde; Amber Tamblyn
- No. of episodes: 23

Release
- Original network: Fox
- Original release: September 20, 2010 – May 23, 2011

Season chronology
- ← Previous; Season 6 Next → Season 8

The seventh season of House premiered on September 20, 2010, and ended on May 23, 2011. House and Cuddy attempt to make a real relationship work and face the question as to whether their new relationship will affect their ability to diagnose patients. The new season features a new opening title sequence. This was the second change in the opening sequence since the show began; Jennifer Morrison's name was removed from the credits, while Peter Jacobson's and Olivia Wilde's were added to it, with new background images also inserted into the traditional title sequence. This is the last season to feature Lisa Edelstein, who did not return for the eighth season.

Prior to the start of the season, it was announced that a multi-episode arc that would feature House on the road was scrapped, forcing David Shore to return to the show to rework the rest of the season. Furthermore, Fox ordered one more episode for the season, bringing the total number of episodes to 23. The last episode of the season aired on May 23, 2011.

== Cast and characters ==
=== Main cast ===
- Hugh Laurie as Dr. Gregory House
- Lisa Edelstein as Dr. Lisa Cuddy (episodes 1–17 and 19–23)
- Omar Epps as Dr. Eric Foreman
- Robert Sean Leonard as Dr. James Wilson (episodes 1–10, 12–17 and 19–23)
- Jesse Spencer as Dr. Robert Chase
- Peter Jacobson as Dr. Chris Taub
- Olivia Wilde as Dr. Remy 'Thirteen' Hadley (episodes 1 and 18–23)
- Amber Tamblyn as Martha M. Masters (episodes 6–19)

=== Recurring cast ===
- Jennifer Crystal Foley as Rachel Taub
- Candice Bergen as Arlene Cuddy
- Cynthia Watros as Sam Carr
- Tracy Vilar as Nurse Regina
- Nigel Gibbs as Sanford Wells
- Paula Marshall as Julia Cuddy
- Noelle Bellinghausen as Emily
- Brian Huskey as Dr. Riggin
- Karolina Wydra as Dominika Petrova
- Maurice Godin as Dr. Lawrence Hourani
- Zena Grey as Nurse Ruby
- Vernee Watson-Johnson as Nurse Smits
- Ron Perkins as Dr. Ron Simpson

=== Guest stars ===
Keiko Agena, Shohreh Aghdashloo, Erika Alexander, Kendra Andrews, Logan Arens, Dylan Baker, Kuno Becker, Cleo Berry, Thom Bishops, J.R. Cacia, Erin Cahill, Hayley Chase, Michael Chey, Gabrielle Christian, Justin Chon, Willis Chung, Austin Michael Coleman, Jack Coleman, David Costabile, Stephanie Courtney, Kevin Daniels, Michelle DeFraites, Brett DelBuono, Tiffany Espensen, Kayla Ewell, Chad Faust, Lesley Fera, Andrew Fiscella, Megan Follows, Ken Garito, Sprague Grayden, Joyce Greenleaf, Jennifer Grey, Matthew Haddad, Tina Holmes, Amy Irving, Brittany Ishibashi, Ashley Jones, Zachary Knighton, Amy Landecker, Jennifer Landon, Adrian LaTourelle, James Hiroyuki Liao, Matthew Lillard, Seidy Lopez, Donal Logue, Stella Maeve, Terry Maratos, Chris Marquette, Gerald McCullouch, Rachel Melvin, Brigdett Newman, Linda Park, Kimberlee Peterson, Kevin Phillips, Haley Pullos, Aaron Refvem, Allan Rich, Sasha Roiz, Tony Savas, Vinessa Shaw, Samantha Smith, Alyson Stoner, Tyler James Williams, Jarret Wright and George Wyner.

== Episodes ==
No. overall	No. in season	Title	Directed by	Written by	Original release date	US viewers (millions)
133	1	"Now What?"	Greg Yaitanes	Doris Egan	September 20, 2010	10.69
House and Cuddy take the day off to talk about their new relationship, while the team tries to cure the lone neurosurgeon (George Wyner) on staff who must be ready to operate. If not, the hospital will have to shut down its ER and ICU. During the case, Thirteen prepares for her leave of absence. Final diagnosis: Toad egg toxicity
134	2	"Selfish"	Dan Attias	Eli Attie	September 27, 2010	10.18
The team treats a teen skateboarder (Alyson Stoner) who collapsed during a competition, and her family must make an impossible decision. Meanwhile, House reveals his relationship with Cuddy to his team, and they both worry whether they can keep their work lives and love lives separate. Final diagnosis: Sickle cell trait Absent: Olivia Wilde as Remy "Thirteen" Hadley
135	3	"Unwritten"	Greg Yaitanes	John C. Kelley	October 4, 2010	10.78
House and his team race against time to help an author (Amy Irving) who suffered a seizure while attempting to kill herself. With time running out until her psychiatric hold is over and she is released, House believes a clue may be found in her newest manuscript. Meanwhile, House tries to find what common interests he shares with Cuddy, and they double date with Wilson and Sam. Final diagnosis: Trauma-related syringomyelia Absent: Olivia Wilde as Remy "Thirteen" Hadley
136	4	"Massage Therapy"	David Straiton	Peter Blake	October 11, 2010	9.69
House and the team treat a woman (Erin Cahill) suffering from severe vomiting, heart problems, and a fever, but in the course of treatment, the team discovers that she is not who she says she is. During the case, House's new fellow (Vinessa Shaw), a psychiatrist that Chase hired, is welcomed with a trial by fire. Meanwhile, a visit from House's masseuse (and former hooker) forces him and Cuddy to confront the fact they are both holding back in their relationship. Final Diagnosis: Side effects of risperidone; schizophrenia Absent: Olivia Wilde as Remy "Thirteen" Hadley
137	5	"Unplanned Parenthood"	Greg Yaitanes	David Foster	October 18, 2010	9.65
When a newborn experiences breathing problems, the team must look at her mother's (Jennifer Grey) medical history for clues, and what they find leads the mother to a difficult decision. Meanwhile, Foreman and Taub must both find a female replacement for Thirteen, and House and Wilson learn valuable lessons in babysitting when Cuddy has to work late. Final Diagnosis: Abbey: Pulmonary embolism secondary to lung cancer and melanoma. Abbey's baby: hereditary melanoma Absent: Olivia Wilde as Remy "Thirteen" Hadley
138	6	"Office Politics"	Sanford Bookstaver	Seth Hoffman	November 8, 2010	9.63
Brilliant medical student Martha M. Masters (Amber Tamblyn) joins the team at Cuddy's insistence, and her first case is treating a campaign manager (Jack Coleman) who falls ill with a rash, leading to liver failure. But Masters' morality puts her at odds with House and the rest of his team. Meanwhile, House debates whether it is worth lying to Cuddy if it will save his patient's life. Final Diagnosis: Hepatitis C Absent: Olivia Wilde as Remy "Thirteen" Hadley
139	7	"A Pox on Our House"	Tucker Gates	Lawrence Kaplow	November 15, 2010	10.77
A teenage girl (Hayley Chase) comes to the hospital displaying classic smallpox symptoms, which the team dismisses as impossible until her step-father (Andrew Fiscella) gets sick as well. Once the CDC intervenes and isolates the patients, the team is unable to explore any further until House takes a life-threatening risk. Final Diagnosis: Rickettsialpox Absent: Olivia Wilde as Remy "Thirteen" Hadley
140	8	"Small Sacrifices"	Greg Yaitanes	David Hoselton	November 22, 2010	9.24
House must battle disease as well as belief when his patient (Kuno Becker) gets sick after crucifying himself as part of a bargain with God to keep his daughter cancer-free. But when this bargain causes him to refuse treatment, House must devise a new tactic. Meanwhile, Taub sees the other side of indiscretion, and Wilson and Sam's relationship changes. Final Diagnosis: Marburg multiple sclerosis and Rhodococcus equi infection secondary to malnutrition Absent: Olivia Wilde as Remy "Thirteen" Hadley
141	9	"Larger Than Life"	Miguel Sapochnik	Sara Hess	January 17, 2011	10.52
When a bassist (Matthew Lillard) passes out after saving a woman in a subway station, the team must treat him amidst his newfound celebrity, while he begins to realize he may be a better man than he believed. Meanwhile, House must survive a dinner with Cuddy's mother (Candice Bergen), and Taub comes to terms with his marriage after he is featured in an ad for the hospital. Final Diagnosis: Chickenpox Absent: Olivia Wilde as Remy "Thirteen" Hadley
142	10	"Carrot or Stick"	David Straiton	Liz Friedman	January 24, 2011	10.45
A drill sergeant (Sasha Roiz) at a camp for troubled kids collapses with severe back pain, and House and the team must find a connection when one of his recruits (Tyler James Williams) falls ill with the same symptoms. Meanwhile, Chase must track down whoever is pranking him through a social networking site, and House tries to help Rachel get into a prestigious preschool. Final Diagnosis: Variegate porphyria Absent: Olivia Wilde as Remy "Thirteen" Hadley
143	11	"Family Practice"	Miguel Sapochnik	Peter Blake	February 7, 2011	12.33
Cuddy's mother (Candice Bergen) is rushed to the hospital with heart problems, but refuses treatment by House. When he discovers what is killing her, House, his team, and Cuddy risk their careers to give her the treatment without Cuddy's mother or her doctor finding out. During the case, Masters weighs the dangers of coming clean versus keeping quiet. Meanwhile, Taub risks his side job working for his ex-brother-in-law to correct what he deems to be a medical oversight. Final Diagnosis: Cobalt poisoning secondary to metallosis Absent: Robert Sean Leonard as James Wilson and Olivia Wilde as Remy "Thirteen" Hadley
144	12	"You Must Remember This"	David Platt	Kath Lingenfelter	February 14, 2011	9.86
A woman (Tina Holmes) comes to the hospital with temporary paralysis, but it is her perfect memory which compels House to take the case. Meanwhile, Taub prepares for an exam which is vital to his career, and Wilson's new companion has House concerned. Final Diagnosis: McLeod syndrome causing obsessive–compulsive disorder Absent: Olivia Wilde as Remy "Thirteen" Hadley
145	13	"Two Stories"	Greg Yaitanes	Thomas L. Moran	February 21, 2011	10.41
House attends a career day at an elementary school as a favor so Rachel can get accepted. Most of the class becomes fascinated with the case of a man (Willis Chung) who literally coughed up a lung, but things soon get out of control. As House waits for the principal, two students (Austin Michael Coleman & Haley Pullos) prod House into talking about love, and specifically, why Cuddy is angry with him. Final Diagnosis: Food lodged in the lung Absent: Olivia Wilde as Remy "Thirteen" Hadley
146	14	"Recession Proof"	S. J. Clarkson	John C. Kelley	February 28, 2011	11.01
A real estate higher-up (Adrian LaTourelle) is admitted to the hospital with a severe rash, but it soon becomes clear that he does not live the life that he has led his wife to believe. Meanwhile, House grapples with the fact that his relationship may be distracting him and affecting his ability to diagnose his patients. Final Diagnosis: Cryopyrin-associated periodic syndrome (specifically Muckle–Wells syndrome) Absent: Olivia Wilde as Remy "Thirteen" Hadley
147	15	"Bombshells"	Greg Yaitanes	Liz Friedman & Sara Hess	March 7, 2011	11.08
When Cuddy is admitted to the hospital with what may be life-threatening symptoms, House is confronted with the fact that he is not the supportive boyfriend Cuddy needs him to be, and her surreal dreams (including a scene choreographed by Mia Michaels) may be trying to tell her something about her relationship with House. Meanwhile, the team treats a student (Brett DelBuono) whose emotional scars run deeper than his physical ones, and Taub must decide if the student is a threat to others, or a kid struggling to find his way. Final Diagnosis: Ryan: Staphylococcus from an abscess. Cuddy: Benign tumor in the kidney; antibiotic allergy Absent: Olivia Wilde as Remy "Thirteen" Hadley
148	16	"Out of the Chute"	Sanford Bookstaver	Lawrence Kaplow & Thomas L. Moran	March 14, 2011	10.41
Newly single and back on Vicodin, House gives himself the five-star treatment but begins to worry that nothing – not even medical puzzles – can excite him anymore. Meanwhile, he and his team treat a professional bullrider (Chad Faust) who got attacked by a bull after suffering a seizure. But because of his many previous injuries, the team must devise new diagnostic techniques, while Masters becomes quite attached. Final Diagnosis: Bartonellosis Absent: Olivia Wilde as Remy "Thirteen" Hadley
149	17	"Fall from Grace"	Tucker Gates	John C. Kelley	March 21, 2011	9.49
A homeless man (Chris Marquette) is taken to the hospital after suffering a burn, but his condition quickly worsens. What intrigues the team, however, is the fact that he steadfastly refuses to give any information about his real identity. But when the truth of who he really is comes out, it leaves the team stunned. Meanwhile, House agrees to a sham marriage with a prostitute (Karolina Wydra) so she can get her green card, and Cuddy feels guilty for dumping House. Final Diagnosis: Refsum disease Absent: Olivia Wilde as Remy "Thirteen" Hadley
150	18	"The Dig"	Matt Shakman	David Hoselton & Sara Hess	April 11, 2011	8.93
House discovers that Thirteen has been in prison for the past six months, and attempts to discover what crime she was guilty of, while also enlisting her help in defeating his spud gun nemesis (Justin Chon). Meanwhile, the team takes the case of a teacher (Terry Maratos) who is coughing up blood. When they search his home, they find it filled with garbage. But even more disturbing is finding his wife (Kimberlee Peterson) living beneath the filth. Final Diagnosis: Nina: Ehlers–Danlos syndromes leading to compulsive hoarding; Q fever. Brian: Q fever Absent: Lisa Edelstein as Lisa Cuddy and Robert Sean Leonard as James Wilson
151	19	"Last Temptation"	Tim Southam	David Foster & Liz Friedman	April 18, 2011	8.80
Thirteen returns as Masters prepares to graduate. Her final case is that of a teenage girl (Michelle DeFraites) aiming to become the youngest sailor to circumnavigate the globe. As the case progresses, Thirteen voluntarily lets Masters perform the last required lumbar puncture on her, meanwhile House offers Masters an internship in return for forging her lab work requirements. Initially refusing to compromise her integrity, she declines. But when her patient takes a turn for the worse, she must make a decision: her principles, or her patient's life? (Note: Final appearance of Amber Tamblyn as Martha Masters.) Final Diagnosis: Lymphoid sarcoma (Lymphosarcoma)
152	20	"Changes"	David Straiton	Story by : Eli Attie & Seth Hoffman; Teleplay by : Eli Attie	May 2, 2011	8.57
The team takes on the case of a lottery winner (Donal Logue) suffering from paralysis and multiple types of cancer, and they must figure out if it is his new millionaire lifestyle that is making him sick. Meanwhile, Cuddy's mother threatens to sue the hospital over her treatment, and Foreman and Chase make a bet over who is repressing the uglier side of his personality more. Final Diagnosis: Teratoma
153	21	"The Fix"	Greg Yaitanes	Story by : Thomas L. Moran; Teleplay by : Thomas L. Moran & David Shore	May 9, 2011	7.94
After losing a bet with Wilson over a boxing match, House is convinced that the fighter he bet on (Kevin Phillips) has an underlying medical condition that cost him the fight. While he tries to prove it, he leaves his team alone to help a bomb scientist (Linda Park) who suffered a seizure. Meanwhile, House may be experimenting with a new drug to help his leg pain. Final Diagnosis: Wendy: Spanish fly (cantherides) poisoning; Terry: Glomus tumor
154	22	"After Hours"	Miguel Sapochnik	Seth Hoffman & Russel Friend & Garrett Lerner	May 16, 2011	8.92
When House discovers that the experimental drug he has been using causes fatal tumors, he decides to excise them himself. He attempts to do it in his bathtub but fails and calls around for help, with Cuddy being the only one to respond. Meanwhile, Thirteen's friend from prison (Amy Landecker), a relapsed drug user, arrives at her apartment needing medical care after being stabbed. With her friend unwilling to go to the hospital, Thirteen finds herself in trouble when the friend loses sensation and movement in her arm. Chase helps her out, brushing Thirteen's ego aside. Taub receives some unexpected news that could change his life. Final Diagnosis: Entamoeba microbial cyst (referred to as an Amoebic parasitoma)
155	23	"Moving On"	Greg Yaitanes	Kath Lingenfelter & Peter Blake	May 23, 2011	9.11
The team treats a seriously ill performance artist (Shohreh Aghdashloo) who deliberately induced additional symptoms in herself with the aim of turning the diagnostics department into her new masterpiece, as House must decide which of her symptoms are real, and which are self-inflicted. As the case progresses, House vows to make changes in his life, but remains rooted in old habits. After the case is over, House, finally, deals poorly with his anger over the breakup and lashes out by driving through Cuddy's dining room and escaping to a beach. Final Diagnosis: Granulomatosis with polyangiitis (referred to by its former name "Wegener's granulomatosis" in the episode) Final appearance of: Lisa Cuddy.
