= Sons from Afar =

Book by Cynthia Voigt

Sons From Afar
- First edition (publ. Atheneum Books)
- Author: Cynthia Voigt
- Language: English
- Publisher: Atheneum Books
- Publication date: 1987
- ISBN: 0-689-31349-7 (first edition)
- LC Class: PZ7.V874 Sp

Sons From Afar (1987) is the sixth book in Cynthia Voigt's Tillerman Cycle, the series of novels dealing with Dicey Tillerman's family which also includes Homecoming, Dicey's Song (winner of the 1983 Newbery Medal), The Runner, A Solitary Blue, Come A Stranger, and Seventeen Against the Dealer.

== Plot summary ==
With Dicey and her friends Mina and Jeff away at college, Sons From Afar turns its attention to younger brothers James and Sammy. James is now 15 and wondering about his missing father. He and Sammy begin an investigation across Maryland leading to adventures in Easton, Annapolis, and Baltimore to find clues about the life and character of their father. Sammy at first is uninterested in the man who abandoned their mother and his four children, thinking it has no real bearing on him, but he goes along with James for brotherly support. Their roles eventually become reversed after James has an epiphany about accepting himself for what he is and Sammy realises he needs to start asking questions about himself and where he is heading. Along the way, they find "missing men" affecting the lives of more and more people, and renew their understanding of their place in their family.

=== Characters ===
Abigail "Gram" Tillerman: The Tillerman children's maternal grandmother, Gram took them in at the end of Homecoming, the first book in the cycle. She is 64 years old and lives on her family farm with her grandchildren. She is an older version of Dicey, her eldest grandchild and sees the good in all the Tillermans.

James Tillerman: Now almost 16 years old, James has grown into a quiet, insecure young man who is described as having dark hair, a thin, narrow face, and hazel eyes who looks younger than his age. He is embarrassed by himself, afraid of being labeled a "dork" or "brain". He does not share these feelings with his grandmother because he is afraid of worrying her, although Sammy and Maybeth see through James' facade but do not tell him.

He has a hard time asking for things from his grandmother or others (for fear that they will say no) and gives up easily. He is highly intelligent, taking all A-track - advanced - courses at the local high school; however, he lacks athletic ability and physical confidence. He fears the pain of injury. Despite this, he has joined the baseball team because he wants to look well-rounded on his college applications. Even though he hates it and wants to quit, he does not because he does not want people to think he is a quitter.

During the story James changes his post-high school goal from becoming a lawyer and building up a business to becoming a medical doctor. His part-time job at a doctor's office and his helping diagnose a patient with a bladder problem is a main factor in his change of heart.

Throughout most of the book, he is frustrated with Sammy because of his brother's lack of intellectual curiosity and ambition and his stubborn attitude. At the same time, he is envious of his brother's natural athletic ability and self-confidence and self-acceptance. James' respect for Sammy grows when James sees Sammy's bravery and courage when he stands up to a violent grown man at a bar on their search for their father.

Even though he never finds his father, James' experiences teach him that he needs to accept himself for who he is so that he does not "get lost from himself", the way he believes his father had done. It also teaches him to accept his brother.

Samuel "Sammy" Tillerman: Now 12 years old, Sammy is described as blond, hazel-eyed, and tall for his age with a stocky athletic build. He looks older than he is. Sammy is his own person and says and does whatever he wants regardless of what others will think of him. Other children at school look up to and admire him, including girls who Sammy ignores as he thinks they are a pain.

He likes playing sports and being outside. He prefers physical labor rather than intellectual work. Sammy respects James' "book smarts" but is often frustrated with James' lack of confidence and constant questioning and thinking. Sammy believes James is not smart about life or people or even himself, and Sammy thinks these are more important. This attitude changes when Sammy sees James remain calm throughout the bar fight, talking the men down until the boys are able to leave. Sammy proposes at the very end, that they team up their strengths to protect Maybeth from men who might ruin her life, the way their father did to their mother.

Maybeth Tillerman: Now 14 years old, Maybeth resembles the Tillerman's mother, Liza, in looks and personality. She is described by James as pretty, strong looking, with a good figure. She has a great talent for music and singing; even her voice sounds like her mother's.

Despite having this talent, along with skills in cooking and sewing, Maybeth struggles to maintain decent grades in all subjects other than home economics. James helps her with homework and studying and he is awed by how she doesn’t mind having to work so hard to earn only Cs and Ds. Maybeth is gentle and kind, making her popular despite being slow at school.

Dicey Tillerman: The oldest of the Tillerman children at 18 years old, Dicey only appears briefly when she comes home from college for spring break. Although she is clever and finds college easy, she thinks it is not worthwhile when she is needed at home and really wants to learn boat building. However, Gram is insistent that Dicey finish college.

Dicey is a lot like Sammy: direct and stubborn and impatient with James. She has a take-charge attitude and feels she should be at home to take care of her family.

== Literary references ==
James has to do a report in his French class, and ends up doing a second for another student, leading to guilt about cheating.

- Victor Hugo's 1831 novel The Hunchback of Notre-Dame
- Albert Camus, "The Myth of Sisyphus" (essay)

James takes a part-time job in a medical office and answers the distressed call of a man with urinary retention and thinks of an episode in a book he read. Though he realises later he should not have given medical advice, the incident starts him to think he should be a doctor.

- John Steinbeck, Travels With Charley

== Reception ==
A reviewer at Publishers Weekly wrote: "A complex story of the ways in which people piece themselves together with or in spite of their backgrounds." While Kirkus Reviews pointed out the author's craft stating "It's also clear that Voigt has, with her usual careful crafting, built toward this moment with every line of a complex novel."
