= 18th Youth in Film Awards =

1997 US media awards ceremony

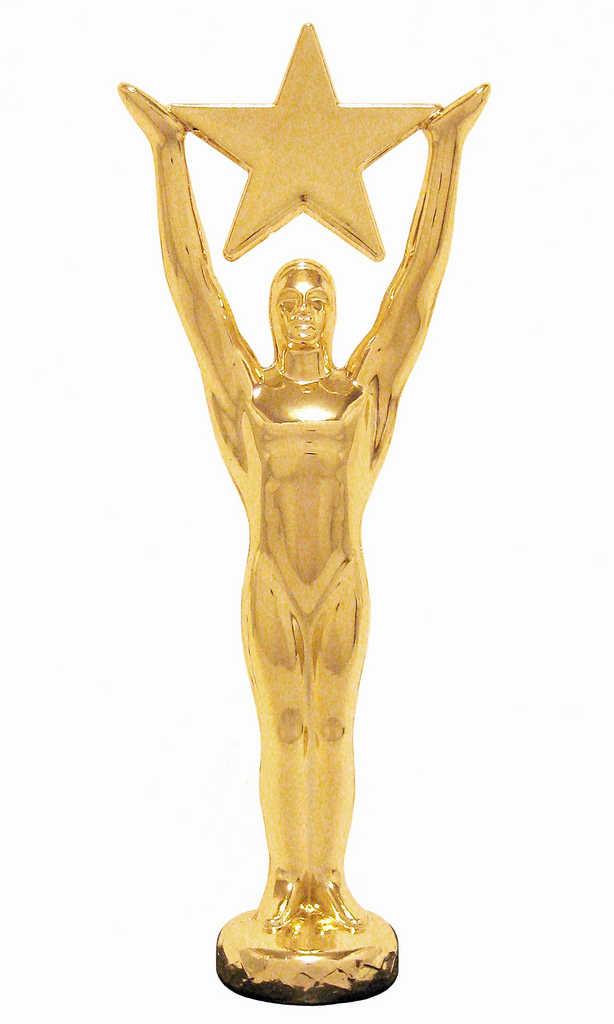
- Awarded for: Achievement in the 1995—1996 season
- Date: 1997
- Site: Hollywood, California
- Hosted by: Mara Wilson

The 18th Youth in Film Awards ceremony (now known as the Young Artist Awards), presented by the Youth in Film Association, honored outstanding youth performers under the age of 21 in the fields of film, television, music and radio for the 1995–1996 season, and took place in 1997 in Hollywood, California.

Established in 1978 by long-standing Hollywood Foreign Press Association member, Maureen Dragone, the Youth in Film Association was the first organization to establish an awards ceremony specifically set to recognize and award the contributions of performers under the age of 21 in the fields of film, television, theatre and music.

== Categories ==
★ Bold indicates the winner in each category.

== Best Young Performer in a Feature Film ==
=== Best Performance in a Feature Film: Leading Young Actor ===
★ Lucas Black – Sling Blade as Frank Wheatley

- Vincent Kartheiser – Alaska as Sean Barnes
- Joe Perrino – Sleepers as Young Shakes
- Kyle Howard – House Arrest as Grover Beindorf
- Kevin Bishop – Muppet Treasure Island as Jim Hawkins

=== Best Performance in a Feature Film: Leading Young Actress ===
★ Michelle Trachtenberg – Harriet the Spy as Harriet M. Welsch

- Mara Wilson – Matilda as Matilda Wormwood
- Thora Birch – Alaska as Jessie Barnes
- Anna Paquin – Fly Away Home as Amy Alden
- Heather Matarazzo – Welcome to the Dollhouse as Dawn Wiener

=== Best Performance in a Feature Film: Supporting Young Actor ===
★ Blake Bashoff – Big Bully as Ben Leary

- Gregory Smith – Harriet the Spy as Simon "Sport" Rocque
- Brawley Nolte – Ransom as Sean Mullen
- Geoffrey Wigdor – Sleepers as Young John Riley
- Adam Zolotin – Jack as Louis Durante

=== Best Performance in a Feature Film: Supporting Young Actress ===
★ (tie) Vanessa Lee Chester – Harriet the Spy as Janie Gibbs
★ (tie) Claire Danes – To Gillian on Her 37th Birthday as Rachel Lewis

- Jessica Wesson – Flipper as Kim Parker
- Kira Spencer Hesser – Matilda as Hortensia
- Erin Williby – First Kid as Katie Warren

=== Best Performance in a Feature Film: Actor Age Ten or Under ===
★ Jonathan Lipnicki – Jerry Maguire as Ray Boyd

- Alex D. Linz – One Fine Day as Sammy Parker
- Jake Lloyd – Unhook the Stars as J.J.
- Haley Joel Osment – Bogus as Albert Franklin
- Eric Lloyd, – Dunston Checks In as Kyle Grant
- Ross Bagley – Independence Day as Dylan Dubrow

=== Best Performance in a Feature Film: Actress Age Ten or Under ===
★ Mae Whitman – One Fine Day as Maggie Taylor

- Ashley Buccille – Phenomenon as Glory Pennamin
- Siri Howard – Welcome to the Dollhouse as Chrissy
- Yvonne Zima – The Long Kiss Goodnight as Caitlin

== Best Young Performer in a Foreign Film ==
=== Best Performance in a Foreign Film ===
★ Andrei Chalimon – Kolya (Czech Republic) as Kolya

- Chloe Ferguson – The Quiet Room (Australia) as Girl (age 7)
- Tiba Tossijn – Long Live the Queen (The Netherlands) as Sara
- Tatjana Trieb – Beyond Silence (Germany) as Young Lara
- Gregg Fitzgerald – War of the Buttons (Ireland) as Fergus

== Best Young Performer in a TV Movie or Mini Series ==
=== Best Performance in a TV Movie / Mini Series: Young Actor ===
★ Kenny Vadas – Captains Courageous as Harvey Cheyne, Jr

- Shelton Dane – Hidden in America as Robbie Januson
- Noah Fleiss – Chasing the Dragon as Sean Kessler
- Devon Sawa – Night of the Twisters as Dan Hatch
- Erik von Detten – Christmas Every Day as Billy Jackson
- Tim Redwine – A Step Toward Tomorrow as Ben Lerner

=== Best Performance in a TV Movie / Mini Series: Young Actress ===
★ Jena Malone – Bastard Out of Carolina as Ruth Anne "Bone" Boatwright

- Kimberlee Peterson – Homecoming as Dicey Tillerman
- Rebekah Johnson – Ruby Jean and Joe as Ruby Jean
- Julia McIlvaine – The Summer of Ben Tyler as Nell Rayburn
- Tegan Moss – The Angel of Pennsylvania Avenue as Bernice Feagan
- Allison Jones – Nightjohn as Sarny

== Best Young Performer in a Television Series ==
=== Best Performance in a TV Drama Series: Young Actor ===
★ Shawn Toovey – Dr. Quinn, Medicine Woman as Brian Cooper

- David Gallagher – 7th Heaven as Simon Camden
- Ryan Merriman – The Pretender as Young Jarod/Gemini
- Austin O'Brien – Promised Land as Josh Greene
- George O. Gore II – New York Undercover as Gregory "G" Williams
- Darris Love – The Secret World of Alex Mack as Raymond "Ray" Alvarado

=== Best Performance in a TV Drama Series: Young Actress ===
★ Beverley Mitchell – 7th Heaven as Lucy Camden

- Lacey Chabert – Party of Five as Claudia Salinger
- Ashley Peldon – The Pretender as Young Miss Parker
- Jessica Bowman – Dr. Quinn, Medicine Woman as Colleen Cooper
- Sarah Schaub – Promised Land as Dinah Greene
- Larisa Oleynik – The Secret World of Alex Mack as Alexandra "Alex" Mack

=== Best Performance in a TV Comedy: Leading Young Actor ===
★ Michael Galeota – Bailey Kipper's P.O.V. as Bailey Kipper

- Matthew and Andrew Lawrence – Brotherly Love as Matt Roman and Andy Roman
- Ben Savage – Boy Meets World as Cory Matthews

=== Best Performance in a TV Comedy: Leading Young Actress ===
★ Melissa Joan Hart – Sabrina the Teenage Witch as Sabrina Spellman

- Brandy Norwood – Moesha as Moesha Denise "Mo" Mitchell
- Tia and Tamera Mowry – Sister, Sister as Tia Landry and Tamera Campbell

=== Best Performance in a TV Comedy: Supporting Young Actor ===
★ Billy L. Sullivan – Something So Right as Will Pacino

- Taran Noah Smith – Home Improvement as Mark Taylor
- Zane Carney – Dave's World as Tommy Barry
- Shaun Weiss – Mr. Rhodes as Jake Mandelleer
- Joseph Gordon-Levitt – 3rd Rock From the Sun as Tommy Solomon
- Rider Strong – Boy Meets World as Shawn Hunter

=== Best Performance in a TV Comedy: Supporting Young Actress ===
- **Kaitlin Cullum – Grace Under Fire** as Elizabeth Louise "Libby" Kelly
- Marne Patterson – Something So Right as Nicole Farrell
- Lindsay Sloane – Mr. Rhodes as Zoey Miller
- Alana Austin – Ink as Abby Logan
- Danielle Fishel – Boy Meets World as Topanga Lawrence

=== Best Performance in a TV Comedy/Drama: Supporting Young Actor Age Ten or Under ===
★ Curtis Williams Jr. – The Parent 'Hood as Nicholas Peterson

- Andrew Ducote – Dave's World as Willie Barry
- Marcus Paulk – Moesha as Myles Mitchell
- Hayden Tank – The Young and the Restless as Victor Adam Wilson
- Eddie Karr – Promised Land as Nathaniel Greene
- Haley Joel Osment – The Jeff Foxworthy Show as Matt Foxworthy

=== Best Performance in a TV Comedy/Drama: Supporting Young Actress Age Ten or Under ===
★ Ashli Amari Adams – The Parent 'Hood as Cecilia "CeCe" Peterson

- Alexa Vega – Life's Work as Tess Hunter
- Mackenzie Rosman – 7th Heaven as Ruthie Camden
- Brittany Tiplady – Millennium as Jordan Black
- Caitlin Wachs – Profiler as Chloe Waters

=== Best Performance in a TV Drama Series: Guest Starring Young Actor ===
★ Ben Salisbury – Promised Land as Trevor Riley

- Nathan Watt – Chicago Hope as Eric Dipretto
- Zachary McLemore – Dr. Quinn, Medicine Woman as Caleb Leonard
- Elijah Wood – Homicide: Life on the Street as McPhee Broadman
- Sam Gifaldi – Touched by an Angel as Young Leonard
- Austin O'Brien – ER as Kyle Kazlaw

=== Best Performance in a TV Drama Series: Guest Starring Young Actress ===
★ Scarlett Pomers – Touched by an Angel as Penny

- Tabitha Lupien – Goosebumps as Ginny Swanson
- Teru McDonald – Pandora's Clock as Amanda Lynch
- Kirsten Dunst – ER as Charlie Chiemingo
- Francesca Smith – The Secret World of Alex Mack as Jenny

=== Best Performance in a TV Comedy: Guest Starring Young Performer ===
★ (tie) Seth Adkins – Sabrina the Teenage Witch as Rex
★ tie) Courtney Peldon – Home Improvement as Lauren

- Robin Marie Verner – Sister, Sister as Girl #4
- Shay Astar – 3rd Rock from the Sun as August
- Miles Marsico – Married... with Children as Boy
- Bridget Flanery – Pearl

=== Best Performance in a Daytime Drama: Young Actor ===
★ Kyle Sabihy – The Bold and the Beautiful as Clarke 'C.J.' Garrison Jr.

- Christian Seifert – As the World Turns as Christopher Hughes
- Steven Hartman – The Bold and the Beautiful as Eric 'Rick' Forrester Jr.
- Jonathan Jackson – General Hospital as Lucky Spencer
- Spencer Treat Clark – Another World as Steven Michael Frame #3

=== Best Performance in a Daytime Drama: Young Actress ===
★ Landry Albright – The Bold and the Beautiful as Bridget Forrester

- Alison Sweeney – Days of Our Lives as Sami Brady
- Erin Torpey – One Life to Live as Jessica Buchanan
- Kimberly McCullough – General Hospital as Robin Scorpio
- Kimberly Brown – Guiding Light as Marah Lewis

== Best Young Performer in a Voice-Over ==
=== Best Performance in a Voice-Over: Young Artist ===
★ Jonathan Taylor Thomas – The Adventures of Pinocchio as Pinocchio

- Paul Terry – James and the Giant Peach as James Henry Trotter
- Adam Wylie – All Dogs Go to Heaven 2 as David
- Charity Sanoy – Rugrats as Sasha

== Best Young Ensemble Performance ==
=== Best Performance in a TV Movie / Home Video: Young Ensemble ===
★ What Love Sees

Trever O'Brien as Gordy Holly, Courtland Mead as Hap Holly, Ashlee Lauren as Faith Holly, Cody McMains as Billy Holly

- Homecoming

William Greenblatt as Sammy Tillerman, Kimberlee Peterson as Dicey Tillerman, Trevor O'Brien as James Tillerman, Hanna Hall as Maybeth Tillerman

- Clubhouse Detectives

Jimmy Galeota as Kade Ruckman, Michael Galeota as Billy Ruckman, Christopher Ball as Eddie Balser, Alex Miranda as J.J. Jimenez Thomas Hobson as Jimmy

- Forest Warrior

Trenton Knight as Justin Franklin, Megan Paul as Austene Slaighter, Josh Wolford as Logan Anderson, Michael Friedman as Lewis Burdette, Jordan Brower as Brian Anderson

=== Best Performance in a TV Series: Young Ensemble ===
★ Nick Freno: Licensed Teacher

Ross Malinger as Tyler Hale, Jonathan Hernandez as Orlando Diaz, Kyle Gibson as Davey Marcucci, Arjay Smith as Jared, Cara DeLizia as Sarah

- Saved by the Bell: The New Class

Lindsey McKeon as Katie Peterson, Samantha Becker as Maria Lopez, Sarah Lancaster as Rachel Meyers, Anthony Harrell as Eric Little, Ben Gould as Nicky Farina, Richard Lee Jackson as Ryan Parker

- Second Noah

Erika Page, as Roxanna Beckett Jeffrey Licon as Luis Beckett, Gemini Barnett as Ben Beckett, Jeremy Togerson as Danny Beckett, Jon Torgerson as Ranny Beckett, Ashley Gorrell as Hannah Beckett, Zelda Harris as Bethany Beckett

== Best Young Host in Television or Radio ==
=== Outstanding Host: Television or Radio ===
★ Lindsay – Radio AAHS

- R. J. Arnett – Radio AAHS
- Roland Thomson – World Youth News

== Best Young Entertainer: Acting and Singing ==
=== Best Male Entertainer ===
★ Adam Wylie

- Chris Allport
- Josh Keaton

=== Best Female Entertainer ===
★ Kristi McClave

- Nassira Nicola
- Ivyann Schwan

== Best Family Entertainment ==
=== Best Family TV Movie or Mini Series: Network ===
★ What Love Sees – CBS

- The Summer of Ben Tyler – CBS
- A Step Toward Tomorrow – CBS
- Gulliver's Travels – NBC

=== Best Family TV Movie or Mini Series: Cable ===
★ Captains Courageous – Family Channel

- Nightjohn – The Disney Channel
- Homecoming – Showtime
- The Angel of Pennsylvania Avenue – Family Channel
- Christmas Every Day – Family Channel

=== Best Family TV Drama Series ===
★ 7th Heaven – WB

- The Secret World of Alex Mack – Nickelodeon
- Promised Land – CBS
- Touched by an Angel – CBS

=== Best Family TV Comedy Series ===
★ Nick Freno: Licensed Teacher – WB

- Sabrina the Teenage Witch – ABC
- Clueless – ABC
- Mr. Rhodes – NBC

=== Best Educational Film or TV Show ===
★ Nick News – Nickelodeon

- The Leopard Son – Discovery Pictures
- Kratt's Creatures – Paragon Entertainment
- Wishbone – Big Feats Entertainment

=== Best Family Feature Film: Foreign ===
★ Kolya – (Czech Republic)

- Luna e l'altra (Italy)
- Long Live the Queen (The Netherlands)
- Beyond Silence (Germany)
- War of the Buttons (Ireland)
- The Eighth Day (Belgium)

=== Best Family Feature Film: Animation or Special Effects ===
★ James and the Giant Peach – Walt Disney

- The Hunchback of Notre Dame – Walt Disney
- Space Jam – Warner Brothers
- Muppet Treasure Island – Walt Disney
- All Dogs Go to Heaven 2 – MGM

=== Best Family Feature Film: Musical or Comedy ===
★ One Fine Day – 20th Century Fox

- That Thing You Do – 20th Century Fox
- 101 Dalmatians – Walt Disney
- Dunston Checks In – 20th Century Fox
- Jack – Hollywood Pictures

=== Best Family Feature Film: Drama ===
★ Fly Away Home – Columbia Pictures

- Alaska – Castle Rock
- Harriet the Spy – Paramount
- Flipper – Universal
- Bogus – Warner Brothers

== Youth In Film's Special Awards ==
=== The Jackie Coogan Award ===
==== Outstanding Contribution to Youth Through Motion Pictures ====
★ The Reppies – For Best Musical and Inspirational Show for Children

=== The Michael Landon Award ===
==== Outstanding Contribution to Youth Through Television ====
★ Dana Lightstone – Producer, Children's Productions

=== Former Child Star Lifetime Achievement Award ===
★ Paul Petersen – The Donna Reed Show as Jeff Stone

=== Outstanding Young Performer in a Television Commercial ===
★ Travis Tedford – Welch's Grape Juice & Jelly

=== Scholarship Recipients ===
★ Gabby and Katie Gillette
★ Aimee Walker
