= Seventeen Against the Dealer =

1989 novel by Cynthia Voigt

- First edition
- Author: Cynthia Voigt
- Language: English
- Series: Tillerman Cycle
- Genre: Young adult novel
- Publisher: Atheneum
- Publication date: 1989
- Publication place: United States
- Media type: Print (paperback)
- Pages: 192
- ISBN: 0-689-31497-3
- OCLC: 50423886
- LC Class: CPB Box no. 2012 vol. 11
- Preceded by: Sons from Afar

Seventeen Against the Dealer is a young adult novel by the American children's author Cynthia Voigt. It is the last of seven novels in the Tillerman Cycle.

== Plot summary ==
Seventeen Against the Dealer is the final novel in the seven-part Tillerman Cycle. The novel takes up the story of Dicey Tillerman, now 21, who has dropped out of college despite a scholarship in order to start her own business building wooden sailboats. Dicey is the oldest of four Tillerman children, whose journey to Crisfield, Maryland and subsequent life there with their grandmother, Abigail Tillerman, or Gram as the children call her, is described in the preceding novels Homecoming, Dicey's Song, and Sons from Afar.

As a continuation of the preceding Tillerman novels, this novel contains characters developed in the previous Tillerman books, notably Dicey's siblings James (now 18), Maybeth (16), and Sammy (15); her boyfriend Jeff Greene (23); her friend Mina Smiths (21), and Gram, the Tillerman's maternal grandmother with whom they have lived for 8 years.

The book is set in around 1986, and the events of the novel take place over a short time-span, between New Year's Eve and Valentine's Day. At the start of the novel, Dicey is just beginning her new boatbuilding business, which she has dropped out of college to start. To learn the trade, she has worked hard in a series of low-paid jobs in Annapolis and Crisfield and now she has built up a small amount of savings that she hopes will enable her to start realizing her dream. Dicey becomes increasingly absorbed in and even obsessed by her work, to the detriment of her relationship with Jeff, who asks Dicey to marry him at the start of the book, explaining that he does not want to have a casual relationship with her. Dicey makes some crucial mistakes in her new business, including failing to take out insurance on the tools and equipment in her workshop. When the workshop is broken into, she loses all she has and cannot make it up, despite help from Jeff. Increasingly desperate, Dicey takes help from a smooth-talking drifter who turns out to be a con artist. Eventually Dicey stacks the odds against herself and has to close up shop. As Dicey's preoccupation with her work increases, her family and friends fade from the pages of the novel, reflecting her neglect of them. Eventually, after a series of crises culminating in Gram's serious illness, Dicey realizes that her relationships are as important as, if not more so than, her work.

The novel also develops, albeit in a lesser way, the characters of the other three Tillerman children, now young adults. James is a stellar student at Yale but as in previous novels experiences problems associated with reason and ethics. He has made close friends - including with Toby, whom he meets in Dicey's Song and is a chess aficionado. Maybeth has grown into a beautiful young woman, who has many female friends and is attractive to men - yet she is still studying hard and failing most classes in school. As she is courted by older men, the novel is haunted by the danger that she could repeat the mistakes of her mother, who left home to pursue an affair with a drifter 12 years her senior. Sammy is a hardworking young man who has a part-time job pumping gas in a service station; he has learned to take apart engines and helps the Tillermans buy their first car. He is a budding tennis star and wants to attend an expensive tennis summer camp.

The Tillermans' home has grown from an isolated place into a centre for social activity - on New Year's Day, for example, a tradition has grown up whereby family and friends gather at the Tillerman home, and a festive meal is eaten with singing and merriment. Gram is a central part of this, having grown considerably since her days of extreme isolation and loneliness.

Although Voigt's characters grow and learn over the course of the novel, the ending does not provide any definite resolutions or total closure. The characters still face difficulties and problems, and it is not clear how marriage to Jeff, for example, will bring Dicey, a hardworking and independent young woman, a resolution to her need and desire to express her independence through work.
