= Carrot and stick (disambiguation) =

Carrot and stick is a metaphor relating to reward and punishment.

Carrot and stick may also refer to:

- "Carrot and Stick", an episode of Better Call Saul
- Carrots and Sticks (album), a 2019 album by Bish
- Carrots and Sticks, a book by Ian Ayres

== See also ==
- "Carrot or Stick", an episode of House
