= Office Politics =

Office Politics may refer to:

- Workplace politics
- Office Politics (House)
- Office Politics (novel), a 1966 novel by Wilfred Sheed
- Office Politics (album), of 2019 by The Divine Comedy
