= Tillerman Cycle =

Children's novel series by Cynthia Voigt

The Tillerman Cycle is a series of children's novels by the author Cynthia Voigt. Currently there are seven titles in the series.

== Titles in the Cycle ==
1. Homecoming (1981)
2. Dicey's Song (1982) – winner of Newbery Medal (1983)
3. A Solitary Blue (1983) – winner of Newbery Honor Award (1984)
4. The Runner (1985)
5. Come a Stranger (1986)
6. Sons from Afar (1987)
7. Seventeen Against the Dealer (1989)

The series does not follow a strict chronological order. Dicey's Song, A Solitary Blue, and Come a Stranger are interlocked and overlap. The Runner is a standalone novel and the events in it take place about ten years before Homecoming.

== Synopsis ==
In Homecoming, the four Tillerman children search for a new home after they are abandoned by their emotionally ill mother. Dicey and her younger brothers and sister eventually settle in with their grandmother ("Gram") on a stark homestead in Crisfield, Maryland on the Chesapeake Bay.

In Dicey's Song, Dicey is confused about where she fits into the family now that Gram has taken over responsibility for the youngsters, but she soon learns that the family still needs her resourcefulness and solid good sense. In her spare time, Dicey works at restoring a derelict sailboat, meticulously sanding down layers of old paint. Metaphorically, her emotional defenses wear away as she slowly opens to hope, friendship, expressive writing, and finally acceptance of her mother's death. When Gram and Dicey bring her mother's ashes home from Boston, the broken family is nearly healed.

The Runner is about Samuel "Bullet" Tillerman, Gram's son and the children's uncle, and takes place before any of the other books in the series.

A Solitary Blue covers events in the life of Jeff Greene, Dicey's love interest.

Come a Stranger covers events in the life of Wilhemina Smiths, Dicey's best friend.

In Sons from Afar, James enlists his brother Sammy's help to find Francis Verricker, who may be the father who deserted them long ago.

Seventeen Against the Dealer resumes Dicey's life story.

== Main characters ==
- Dicey Tillerman: Eldest of the four Tillerman children, Dicey is the central character of three of the novels: Homecoming, Dicey's Song, and Seventeen Against the Dealer. She was born somewhere between 1965–1968 to single mother, Liza Tillerman, and her wayward lover Francis Verricker in Provincetown, Massachusetts. As her mother was mentally unstable for most of their childhood, Dicey acted in a parenting role from a very young age. Dicey is fiercely independent and a problem-solver. She is very realistic and driven. Because she grew up quickly to take care of her siblings, she struggles to fit in with her peers. She loves boats and hopes to build them professionally.
- James Tillerman: James Tillerman is the next eldest child, a thinker rather than a doer, and a natural loner. He loves books and learning, and did well academically but did not have any friends at school. James is known for having ideas and plans. He works from an early point towards getting a scholarship to college while struggling with his self-image and fears of being seen as a "dork." He gets anxious at the thought of physical pain and so prefers activities that do not require much manual labor. He proves to be good with negotiations early on in life which leads him to think he should pursue law school but reconsiders after taking a position as an office clerk in Dr. Landros' office.
- Maybeth Tillerman: Maybeth's teachers thought she was slow and she was kept back a year in school. Because of her bashfulness and fear of strangers, Dicey and James are concerned that she may have inherited their mother's mental illnesses. Maybeth is a gifted singer and begins piano lessons. She also becomes less bashful at school and makes friends, but struggles to keep up in the classroom. She is an excellent cook and enjoys growing her own herbs and vegetables. She sells bundles of herbs to supplement the family income.
- Sammy Tillerman: As a youngster, Sammy had a temper and was constantly fighting because of taunts about his 'insane' mother, lack of father, and mentally slow sister. Sammy was named after his uncle, who was killed in Vietnam. Sammy shares not only his name with his deceased uncle but also, it seems, his good looks and talent for sports. He prefers physical labor to schoolwork. Kids at school respect him because he does things on his own terms and the opinion of others rarely changes his course. Sammy is a hard working person, loves tennis and has a talent for working on cars. As a boy, he, James and Jeff have a crabbing business and when he gets older, he works part-time at the filling station.
- Wilhemina "Mina" Smiths: Mina is the daughter of Reverend Amos Smiths and nurse Raymonda Smiths. She is the fifth of six children, all named after kings and queens from European history. She is black, extremely intelligent and perceptive, as well as being a talented dancer and singer. She is popular at school and Dicey's best friend.
- Abigail "Gram" Tillerman: Abigail is the Tillerman children's maternal grandmother. She is regarded by her townspeople as strange and a loner, but when her grandchildren appear on her doorstep she takes them on as their legal guardian, later adopting them. She is a strong, proud woman like Dicey. Gram is an involved parent who understands and advises the children according to each personality. She allows them to make their own choices even when it goes against her better judgment so that they can learn from their own mistakes.
- Jeff Greene: Jeff is the only child of the "Professor" and his mother who left them when Jeff was seven. Jeff's father, heartbroken, isolated himself leaving Jeff to a quiet and often lonely home life. Jeff enjoys poetry and playing the guitar. Jeff falls in love with Dicey and they date throughout the cycle and he adopts the Tillermans as his surrogate family. He makes his own place in the family easily by connecting with each of the Tillermans in a special way. He has a talent for giving gifts in a way that even the proud Tillermans can accept.

== Recurring supporting characters ==
- Tamer Shipp: Tamer is a main character in The Runner and Come a Stranger. In the first, he is a classmate of Bullet's and runs cross country with him; in the second, it is ten years later and he is a Reverend and father of three.
- Reverend Amos Smiths: Mina's father, Reverend Smiths features in Come a Stranger and Sons from Afar. Although a deeply spiritual and religious man, he does not push religion on his children.
- Mrs Smiths: Mrs Raymonda Smiths appears in Come a Stranger as Mina's tough, caring, intelligent, insightful mother.
- Isaac Lingerle: Mr Lingerle is Maybeth Tillerman's piano teacher. He becomes like an extra member of the Tillerman family. He appears first in Dicey's Song and then in Sons from Afar.
- Professor Horace Greene: The Professor is Jeff's father and a main character in A Solitary Blue. He is an introverted man who is heartbroken over his wife's leaving him when Jeff is seven. As a consequence, the Professor becomes very closed off, even to Jeff.
- Brother Thomas: Brother Thomas is a good friend of Professor Greene's. They meet at the college in Baltimore where they both work.
- Mr. Chappelle: An English teacher that Dicey and Mina have in Dicey's Song and Jeff has in A Solitary Blue.
