= A Step Toward Tomorrow =

- Directed by: Deborah Reinisch
- Written by: Tom Nursall; Harris Goldberg
- Starring: Judith Light; Tom Irwin; Christopher Reeve; Alfre Woodard
- Cinematography: Neil Roach
- Edited by: Scott Vickrey
- Music by: Ron Ramin
- Production company: Craig Anderson Productions
- Release date: November 10, 1996
- Running time: 93 minutes
- Country: United States
- Language: English

A Step Toward Tomorrow is a 1996 drama film directed by Deborah Reinisch and starring Judith Light as the divorcee mother of a paralyzed son. The film also starred Tom Irwin as neurosurgeon to help get him an experimental spinal-cord operation. The film also had special appearance by Alfre Woodard and a brief cameo by Christopher Reeve in his first acting role since his 1995 injury which left him quadriplegic.

== Plot ==
A divorcee moves her family cross-country to take her paralyzed son to a pioneer neurosurgeon.

== Cast ==
- Judith Light as Anna Lerner
- Tom Irwin as Dr. David Decker
- Kendall Cunningham as Georgie Lerner
- Tim Redwine as Ben Lerner
- Christopher Reeve as Denny Gabriel
- Alfre Woodard as Dr. Sandlin
- Brad Dourif as Kirby
- Nick Searcy as Jim
- Lee Norris as Perry

== Reception ==
Judith Light's performance drew critical praise. John Voorhees from The Seattle Times "Judith Light is wholly believable as a fiercely loving divorced mother trying desperately to find help for her younger son, paralyzed after a diving accident. She tracks down a doctor and a clinic she feels holds out hope - only to find her health insurance doesn't cover the expensive operation that is needed. But that description is only the bare bones of "A Step Toward Tomorrow," which also has romance, humor and some mystery, as well, thanks to Tom Nursall and Harris Goldberg's solid script and Deborah Reinisch's sensitive direction. In addition to Light, who has never been better, there's a terrific performance by Tim Redwine, as the injured boy's older, caring brother, and by Tom Irwin, who seems an unlikely hero but is all the more convincing because of it. Kendall Cunningham is fine as the injured boy and Brad Dourif and Alfre Woodard score points in smaller roles."

The film received two nominations at the 18th Youth in Film Awards.
