= Carrot or Stick =

- House episode
- Episode no.: Season 7 Episode 10
- Directed by: David Straiton
- Written by: Liz Friedman
- Original air date: January 24, 2011

Guest appearances
- Sasha Roiz as Instructor Driscoll; Tyler James Williams as Landon Parks; Nigel Gibbs as Sanford Wells; Kayla Ewell as Nika; Stella Maeve as Kenzie; Maïté Schwartz as Bree; Rachel Melvin as Wynn Phillips

Episode chronology
← Previous "Larger than Life"	Next → "Family Practice"
- House season 7

"Carrot or Stick" is the tenth episode of the seventh season of the American medical drama House. It first aired on Fox on January 24, 2011. Sasha Roiz and Tyler James Williams guest star.

== Plot ==
House and his team investigate a case of a drill instructor who works in a juvenile offender camp named Camp Driscoll when he collapses due to acute back pain. Throughout the episode, Masters debates on whether or not military-style discipline is necessary for children. When they suspect that one of his students has poisoned him, Foreman and Masters come upon Landon, a student whom Driscoll seems to push harder than the others. Later, Landon ends up in the hospital with the same symptoms. After learning that Landon was put into the camp for a relatively minor offense, further research reveals that Driscoll is Landon's father. It appears they have a genetic disease, and House eventually concludes it's variegate porphyria.

Meanwhile, House tries to help Cuddy's daughter Rachel get into a prestigious preschool. He first visits the school under false pretenses, takes pictures of all the toys in the test room and buys several of them. He then tries to train Rachel in a dog-training manner, unbeknownst to Cuddy. When Rachel's playdate ends, the teachers tell Cuddy that her daughter did so well that it looks like someone taught Rachel how to play with all the toys. Cuddy truthfully says she would never do such a thing. She asks Rachel whether she ever played with the toys before. Rachel lies and says no, which makes House very proud.

Also, Chase faces some personal troubles after a full-frontal nude photo of him, photoshopped to make his penis look much smaller than it is, is posted on his own social networking website. His password (which was unsafely set to 'password') is changed as well, so he is unable to modify the contents himself. He suspects one of the girls he had sex with after a wedding (episode 8, "Small Sacrifices") has taken the photo out of revenge for his lack of interest the morning after. He tracks down all the girls but each of them professes their innocence. In the end, he remembers that the sister of one of the girls he slept with was in the same room that night. When he goes and looks for her it appears he already chatted with her one time. She tells him that he seemed like a nice guy but when she told him she didn't do sex after one date, he ran. After that she felt he needed a lesson. She eventually gives him the new password, so Chase can finally repair his own profile. Chase then apologizes and asks her on a real date without sex, to which she happily declines.

== Reception ==
The A.V. Club gave this episode a C rating.
