= The Fix (House) =

- House episode
- Episode no.: Season 7 Episode 21
- Directed by: Greg Yaitanes
- Story by: Thomas L. Moran
- Teleplay by: Thomas L. Moran; David Shore
- Original air date: May 9, 2011

Guest appearances
- Linda Park as Dr. Wendy Lee; Kevin Phillips as Terry Foley; Kevin Daniels as Caesar; Brian Huskey as Dr. Riggin

Episode chronology
← Previous "Changes"	Next → "After Hours"
- House season 7

"The Fix" is the twenty-first episode of the seventh season of the American medical drama House. It aired on Fox on May 9, 2011.

== Plot ==
After losing a bet on a boxing match to Wilson, House sets out to prove the fighter he bet on (Kevin Phillips) lost due to an underlying medical condition. House also begins injecting himself with an experimental drug reported to regrow muscle in rats. The team treats a military contractor, Dr. Lee (Linda Park) for seizures and symptoms of radiation poisoning. They discover that Dr. Lee's boyfriend, Caesar (Kevin Daniels), has been poisoning her with Spanish Fly, which causes symptoms similar to radiation poisoning.

== Cast ==
Besides the main cast and guest appearances the episode also features Ken Olandt, John T. Woods, Drew Cohn, Frank Drank, Denice Sealy, Helena Apothaker and Bobbin Bergstrom.

== Songs ==
"Unseen Eye" by Sonny Boy Williamson I

== Reception ==
=== Critical response ===
IGN gave the episode the score of 7.5 over 10, praising the plot of House's new medicine.

The A.V. Club gave this episode a C rating.
