= Fall from Grace (House) =

- House episode
- Episode no.: Season 7 Episode 17
- Directed by: Tucker Gates
- Written by: John C. Kelley
- Original air date: March 21, 2011

Guest appearances
- Christopher Marquette as Danny Jennings/Ferris Bueller; Karolina Wydra as Dominika Petrova

Episode chronology
← Previous "Out of the Chute"	Next → "The Dig"
- House season 7

"Fall from Grace" is the seventeenth episode of the seventh season of the American medical drama House. It aired on Fox on March 21, 2011.

== Plot ==
The team takes up the case of a homeless man who was accidentally burned by a miniature rocket launched by two boys in a local park. The patient's most striking symptom is confusing various smells (e.g. body odor for peppermint). He also hides his real name and other information, saying that he does not want his abusive father to be drawn into the case. Now that he can fight back, he is afraid that he might kill his father, who apparently abused him as a child by putting out cigarettes on his body. Masters shows sympathy towards the patient due to his desire to do penance for his past deeds and his aspirations of becoming a doctor.

Meanwhile, House rides a Segway through the hospital with Dominika Petrova (Karolina Wydra), whom he introduces as his fiancée. Confronted by Wilson, House reveals that he is marrying her so she can get her green card; in exchange, she will take care of his specific needs.

As the team explores various diagnoses, the patient's health begins to deteriorate rapidly. One test reveals 13 bone fragments in his colon, which he says are the result of eating leftovers given to him by a cook at an Italian restaurant. House eventually determines that the patient has been eating a primarily vegetarian diet at the hospital, which in conjunction with Refsum disease has been causing his symptoms.

House later marries Dominika in his apartment, with the rest of the team, Wilson, and Cuddy present as witnesses. Cuddy breaks down when House recites his vows. Afterward, Dominika confides to House that, although the marriage is one of convenience, she really does like him. His response is that he likes her too, but he does not sleep with married women which leaves her shocked.

Later, Masters visits the patient's room only to find the rest of the team watching from the hall as FBI agents and SWAT team officers search it for evidence. A DNA sample sent to the lab led to the patient being identified as a cannibalistic serial killer who is wanted in 10 states for a string of 13 murders which leaves Masters completely stunned.

== Reception ==
=== Critical response ===
The A.V. Club gave this episode a C+ rating.
