= Bad Girls (Voigt novel) =

1996 novel by Cynthia Voigt

- Author: Cynthia Voigt
- Language: English
- Series: Fiction
- Publisher: Scholastic
- Publication date: April 1, 1996
- Media type: Print
- Pages: 277
- ISBN: 9780590601351
- Followed by: Bad, Badder, Baddest (1997)

Bad Girls is a young-adult novel by Cynthia Voigt, first published in 1997. It follows two fifth-graders, Michelle "Mikey" Elsinger and Margalo Epps, exploring issues of friendship, courage, and ethics using the lens of these two girls who are ambitious, combative, intelligent, and independent in ways that break from the norm. Voigt uses the concept of "bad"-ness here in somewhat the way Nietzsche deals with good and evil in his Beyond Good and Evil, debunking some of our socially constructed values (in this case, surrounding gender) rather than merely embracing the dark side.

The novel has been translated into Dutch, French, German, Italian, Polish, and Spanish.

== Sequels ==
Sequels in the "Bad Girls" series include Bad, Badder, Baddest; It's Not Easy Being Bad; Bad Girls in Love; and Bad Girls, Bad Girls, Whatcha Gonna Do? which will reportedly be the last in the series. Each book takes the two girls through one grade.
