= Legend of the Lost Tomb =

- Promotional poster
- Genre: Adventure thriller
- Based on: Tales of a Dead King by Walter Dean Myers
- Written by: Jeremy Doner
- Directed by: Jonathan Winfrey
- Starring: Stacy Keach; Brock Pierce; Kimberlee Peterson; Rick Rossovich; Khaled El Sawy
- Music by: Kevin Kiner
- Country of origin: United States
- Original language: English

Production
- Producer: Julie Corman
- Cinematography: Nicholas von Sternberg
- Editor: Louis F. Cioffi
- Running time: 90 minutes
- Production companies: Hallmark Entertainment; RHI Entertainment; Trinity Pictures

Original release
- Network: Showtime
- Release: May 18, 1997

Legend of the Lost Tomb is a 1997 American adventure thriller film directed by Jonathan Winfrey and written by Jeremy Doner, based on the 1983 young adult book Tales of a Dead King by Walter Dean Myers. It premiered on Showtime on May 18, 1997.

== Plot ==
Fifteen-year-old John Robie's father is an Egyptologist who goes missing during an excavation in Egypt. After arriving in Egypt to search for his missing father, he meets seventeen-year-old Karen Lacy. The two team up to find clues to John's missing father and to his excavations which included a map to the treasures of the Pharaoh Ramesses II.

While they are on their search, they are pursued by mysterious men who are in search of the map as well.

== Cast ==
- Stacy Keach as Dr. William Bent
- Brock Pierce as John Robie
- Kimberlee Peterson as Karen Lacy
- Rick Rossovich as Dr. Eric Leonhardt
- Khaled El-Sawi as Salaam
- Hamdy Heykal as Scorpion
- Youssef Dawoud as Dr. Gamael
- Tarek Eletreby as Ali
- Mahmoud El Lozy as Hotel Manager
- Zahi Hawass as Director of the Pyramids
- Pierre Sioufi as Sunshine Tour Guide
- Abdel Lateef Gamaea as Jeep Driver
- Mohamed Baeter as Fruit Vendor
- Hani Desokey as Dig Director
- Jonathan Winfrey as Tourist
- Farouk Abaziad as Omar
- Foad Abbass as Conductor
- Magdi Ismael as Engineer
- Noha Farouk as Secretary
- Mohamed El Betar as Bazaar Vendor
- Hassan El Doukshi as Ramses II
