= Better Start Running =

- Film poster
- Directed by: Brett Simon
- Written by: Chad Faust; Annie Burgstede
- Produced by: Dawn Bierschwal; Annie Burgstede; Chad Faust; Eric Fischer; Brianna Lee Johnson; Douglas W. Miller
- Starring: Alex Sharp; Analeigh Tipton; Edi Gathegi; Karan Soni; Maria Bello; Jeremy Irons
- Edited by: Matt Tassone; Michael Taylor
- Music by: Matthew Compton; Matt Popieluch
- Production companies: Whip Smart Productions; London Pacific Finance
- Distributed by: Freestyle Digital Media
- Release date: April 28, 2018 (Newport Beach)
- Running time: 92 minutes
- Country: United States
- Language: English

Better Start Running is a 2018 American comedy drama film directed by Brett Simon and starring Alex Sharp, Analeigh Tipton, Edi Gathegi, Karan Soni, Maria Bello, Kris Jerome Flowers and Jeremy Irons.

== Cast ==
- Analeigh Tipton as Stephanie Peterson
- Alex Sharp as Harley Johnson
- Jeremy Irons as Garrison Curtis
- Edi Gathegi as Fitz Paradise
- Maria Bello as Agent McFadden
- Karan Soni as Agent Nelson Husseini
- Chad Faust as Dale Hankey
- Jane Seymour as Mary Linson

== Reception ==
The film has a 33% rating on Rotten Tomatoes.
