= Girl (2020 film) =

Thriller film by Chad Faust

- Theatrical release poster
- Directed by: Chad Faust
- Written by: Chad Faust
- Produced by: Shayne Putzlocher; Sara Shaak; Thomas Michael
- Starring: Bella Thorne; Chad Faust; Elizabeth Saunders; Mickey Rourke
- Cinematography: Kristofer Bonnell
- Edited by: Gloria Tong
- Music by: Dillon Baldassero
- Production companies: Double Dutch International; Pacific Northwest Pictures; Fella Films; Anamorphic Media; Trilight; Envision Media Arts
- Distributed by: Screen Media Films
- Release dates: September 25, 2020 (Fantastic Fest); November 20, 2020 (United States)
- Running time: 92 minutes
- Countries: United States; Canada
- Language: English
- Box office: $25,995

Girl is a 2020 Canadian-American thriller film written and directed by Chad Faust. The film stars Bella Thorne as a young woman known only as Girl, who returns to her hometown with the intention of murdering her abusive father, only to discover that somebody else has already murdered him. The film's cast also includes Faust, Elizabeth Saunders, Mickey Rourke, Lanette Ware and Glen Gould. The film was shot in 2019 in Sudbury, Ontario.

== Plot ==
A young woman known only as "Girl" rides a bus back to her small hometown of Golden with the intention of murdering her abusive father named CW James, bringing her father's hatchet as a weapon. Girl calls her mother asking her to read a letter written by her father, her mother says that the letter contains a threat to kill the mother; Girl asks her mother for the return address, but her mother says she doesn't need to know it. The bus stops to let Girl walk away from the highway into the small town of Golden. As she walks, a town sheriff offers her a ride but she refuses and stops at the bar, where she finds the address of her father in the phonebook and has a drink, and a run-in with Betty. Upon arriving at his house, however, she finds her father already murdered by someone else. Attempting to report the murder to the sheriff to no avail, Girl returns to the bar where she calls her mother about his murder, vowing to find out who is responsible but her mother persuades her to go home.

At the laundromat, she encounters a man who goes by the name "Charmer" and they chat. Girl is apprehensive at first but warms up to Charmer; she begins to casually flirt and even opens up about how her father taught her how to expertly throw hatchets when she was only six years old. However, when Girl sees Charmer wearing a watch with CW's initials on it, suggesting that Charmer might be the killer, Girl attacks him and tries to kill him with her hatchet but the sheriff arrives and intervenes. Girl tells the sheriff that Charmer killed her father, and the sheriff brings Charmer and Girl to his car. However, it turns out that the sheriff and Charmer are actually responsible for CW's murder, and the two belong to the group called "The Brothers." The two learned about the money and the secret letter, which Girl is unaware of, but they refuse to reveal the information about the letter. The two then drive to CW's house and they tie Girl up at the shack. The sheriff asks Girl the whereabouts of the hidden money by threatening her with an angle grinder, but she claims she does not know where the money is. Eventually, Girl tells them that the money is underneath the bathtub of the house. When they check the bathtub, they find nothing. Girl manages to break free and escapes.

Girl asks the barkeeper the address of The Brothers. She goes to Charmer's house where she confronts Charmer. Charmer taunts Girl for being a coward, and she stabs him with a knife. Charmer stumbles back into the stove and his robe catches fire resulting in him being burned alive. After the sheriff arrives, Girl escapes in Charmer's car and the sheriff chases her. Girl then hides in a house where Betty lives. Betty, an acquaintance of the sheriff's, reveals that her father abused her mother when she was a child. Her mother kicked him out of the house and never saw him again. Betty tells him that Girl's father, having a change of heart, began to care for her, and her father began to save money from work, intended for Girl. Betty also reveals that her father was killed because of his love for his daughter, and the money; Charmer and the sheriff are actually Girl's mother's brothers (Girl's maternal uncles). Before she leaves, Betty gives her a photo of Girl and her father. Girl sees a small log in the photo, realizing that the money might be hidden there.

Girl arrives at her father's house where the sheriff attacks her and asks her for the whereabouts of the money until Girl kills him with an axe. She finds the bag of money buried under the small log. Shortly after, her mother arrives and Girl demands to know about the letter and her motive, but the mother refuses because she left it at home. When Girl intimidates her with an axe, the mother reveals that her motive for CW's murder was that her husband cheated on her. After they understand each other's predicament, the mother leaves. The next day, Girl gives some of the money to Betty and some to the barkeeper, and leaves the town on a bus.

== Cast ==
- Bella Thorne as Girl
- Chad Faust as Charmer
- Elizabeth Saunders as Mama
- Mickey Rourke as Sheriff
- Lanette Ware as Betty
- Glen Gould as Barkeeper

== Release ==
The film premiered on September 25, 2020, both in the United States at the Fantastic Fest in Austin as part of the online lineup, and with a socially distanced gala screening at the 2020 Cinéfest Sudbury International Film Festival before being added to that festival's online platform.

It was released in select theaters on November 20, 2020, and through video on demand on November 24 in the United States by Screen Media Films.

== Reception ==
On review aggregator website Rotten Tomatoes, the film holds an approval rating of 59% based on 29 reviews, with an average rating of 5.2/10. The site's critics consensus reads: "Impressive work from Bella Thorne in the title role notwithstanding, Girl struggles to differentiate itself from other female-fronted revenge thrillers."
