= Larger than Life (House) =

- House episode
- Episode no.: Season 7 Episode 9
- Directed by: Miguel Sapochnik
- Written by: Sara Hess
- Original air date: January 17, 2011

Guest appearances
- Matthew Lillard as Jack; Sprague Grayden as Eva; Jennifer Crystal Foley as Rachel Taub; Shyloh Oostwald as Daisy; Candice Bergen as Arlene Cuddy

Episode chronology
← Previous "Small Sacrifices"	Next → "Carrot or Stick"
- House season 7

"Larger than Life" is the ninth episode of the seventh season of the American medical drama House. It aired on Fox on January 17, 2011.

== Plot ==
When a musician named Jack (guest star Matthew Lillard) puts his life on the line to save a stranger who fell onto subway tracks, he emerges unscathed, then suddenly collapses, much to his young daughter Daisy's distress. The team works to diagnose his problem as his condition worsens, with only House remaining cynical about his heroism. Masters insists it must be an infection, but House dismisses the idea. Jack, who is away from home most of the time touring with his band, decides to give it up to be with his wife and daughter.

Taub draws unexpected attention when his face graces billboards advertising the hospital. As Taub and his wife reignite a physical relationship, Masters’ outside perspective helps him realize that it is time to take drastic action on his crumbling marriage.

Meanwhile, House trades barbs with an abrasive clinic patient, only to realize to his horror that she is Cuddy's mother Arlene (guest star Candice Bergen), come to check out her daughter's boyfriend. He lies in a futile attempt to avoid a dinner with Cuddy, Arlene, and Wilson, even though it is Cuddy's birthday. The dinner is very uncomfortable for all. House's solution is to secretly drug both Arlene and Wilson into unconsciousness. The next day, before he is forced to apologize, Arlene lets slip that she thinks she just drank too much. She tells House that she approves of his relationship with Cuddy. Then, as she is leaving, she remarks that she does not like children because she always catches diseases from them.

House realizes that Daisy has given Jack chicken pox, a very serious disease when first contracted as an adult. When questioned, Jack's wife Eva reveals she has kept her daughter out of school because of an outbreak, but Daisy is still a carrier. Jack turns out to be one of the 5% who do not show the typical symptoms. It is easy enough to cure, once properly diagnosed.

As Jack recovers, he informs Eva (guest star Sprague Grayden) that the band needs him for just a few more performances. In private, Eva tells a puzzled Taub that this is what Jack always does. He has not been changed at all by his experience. Taub goes home and tells his wife that they should get a divorce; he cannot give up his philandering, and it hurts her so much, she has turned to an online relationship for emotional comfort.

== Reception ==
=== Critical Response ===
The A.V. Club gave this episode a B− rating.
