= The Dig (House) =

- House episode
- Episode no.: Season 7 Episode 18
- Directed by: Matt Shakman
- Written by: Sara Hess; David Hoselton
- Original air date: April 11, 2011

Guest appearances
- Terry Maratos as Brian; Justin Chon as Harold Lam; Jennifer Crystal Foley as Rachel Taub; Kimberlee Peterson as Nina; Zena Grey as Nurse Ruby

Episode chronology
← Previous "Fall from Grace"	Next → "Last Temptation"
- House season 7

"The Dig" is the 18th episode of the seventh season of the American medical drama House. It first aired on Fox on April 11, 2011. This is the 150th episode of the series and marks the return of Thirteen, whose whereabouts have been unknown to House's team for the last year. Wilson and Cuddy do not appear in this episode.

== Plot ==
The episode starts with House waiting outside Middlebury Correctional Institute in New Jersey. It turns out he is picking up the freshly released Thirteen, who is surprised to see House. As they drive away, House asks her what she did. When she replies that she was in jail for "excessive prescribing", House states that this was only her plea bargain and not the truth. Thirteen avoids the question.

Meanwhile, back at the hospital, Masters presents a case to her teammates: a 36-year-old teacher coughing up blood. House pages the team that he will be away for three days. Chase and Foreman ignore Masters' case. Chase plans to go on vacation to Cabo while Foreman plans to go skiing. House is, however, listening on Masters' phone and forces the team to test the patient. House avoids telling the team about Thirteen. After talking with the patient, Chase diagnoses a Serratia infection, which is immediately ruled out by the patient coughing up blood.

House mentions he is going to a spud-gun competition. They take a detour to buy fresh clothes for Thirteen and around a residential neighborhood where Thirteen knees an unidentified man (portrayed by Lost co-creator Damon Lindelof) in the groin at his house. House tells Thirteen about his relationship with Cuddy and their recent breakup. Thirteen tells House that she killed a man.

Foreman and Taub search the patient's house, and find out that he is a hoarder and come up with aspergillosis for a diagnosis. However, this is also ruled out by Taub and Masters. Chase and Masters search the house again and come up with a diagnosis of Q fever, but also find the patient's wife hidden at the house, who is revealed to be the actual hoarder.

House and Thirteen plan to build a powerful spud gun to defeat House's nemesis Harold Lam, who has already defeated him four times at the same competition. Although initially reluctant, Thirteen throws herself into the project. At the competition, Thirteen indirectly lets slip that she had a brother. House figures out that Thirteen had euthanized her brother, who like her mother, suffered from Huntington's disease. Thirteen admits this and explains that her brother had asked her to end his life in one of his increasingly short periods of lucidity. She tells him that she knows that she will one day reach similar state and that no one will be able to help her in the same way, a plaintive declaration that clearly troubles the silent and pensive House. However, Thirteen takes his silence as a lack of emotional response, and tells him, "it's no wonder Cuddy broke up with you". Back at the competition, House threatens Lam with the spud gun for saying he wanted to make moves on Thirteen, but gets only a warning from the police because of Lam's having put the moves on the sheriff's daughter earlier. Thirteen waits for House outside the sheriff's station in the same manner he waited for her in the opening scene. House mentions to Thirteen that it would have been Cuddy's and his first anniversary that day.

Meanwhile, Taub mentions his date with a new hospital employee to Foreman. However, Foreman finds out that Taub is also sleeping with his ex-wife Rachel. Foreman tells Taub that he is being selfish. Taub later meets Rachel and apologizes for being selfish and not letting her move on with her life. Rachel, however, tells him that she does not mind their relationship in its patently dysfunctional state.

Back at the hospital, treatment for presumed Q fever helps the husband, but not the wife. House asks the team to consider the wife as the only patient. The team comes up with a diagnosis of hydrogen sulfide gas exposure. Chase and Masters return to the patient's house to check for the gas. Masters finds baby clothes among the hoarded stuff at the house and confronts the couple about this, bringing a new symptom to the table - infertility. House, driving back from the competition with Thirteen, asks the team to confirm the validity of the symptom by checking both husband and wife, ignoring Thirteen's attempt to quietly suggest another option without participating in the discussion. Thirteen finally enters the discussion openly, suggesting that infertility is not the only option. The team is excited to hear from Thirteen, but House asks them to save their chatter with her for when she returns the next week. Thirteen suggests an alternative symptom - miscarriage. The final diagnosis of the wife is Ehlers-Danlos syndrome.

In the last scene, House drops Thirteen by her house, sarcastically noting that she owes him $87 for the fuel. When he sees her staring in depression, House tells her, "I'll kill you, when the time comes, if you want". Thirteen nods to him, accepting the offer as she leaves the car.

== Critical reception ==
IGN critic Jonah Krakow gave the episode a score of 8.5 out of 10, mentioning, "I really enjoyed this episode because it allowed House to show a compassionate side of himself to a well-known character, while still being rude and inappropriate."

Zack Handlen of The A.V. Club gave this episode a B rating.
