= Bombshells (House) =

- House episode
- Episode no.: Season 7 Episode 15
- Directed by: Greg Yaitanes
- Written by: Liz Friedman; Sara Hess
- Original air date: March 7, 2011

Guest appearances
- Paula Marshall as Julia Cuddy; Brett DelBuono as Ryan; Lesley Fera as Kay; Ken Garito as Todd

Episode chronology
← Previous "Recession Proof"	Next → "Out of the Chute"
- House season 7

"Bombshells" is the fifteenth episode of the seventh season of the American medical drama series House. It aired on Fox on March 7, 2011.

== Plot ==
A teenager is admitted to the hospital after spitting up blood. Taub also discovers that the boy has been depressed and appears to have been cutting himself. More concern arises when the team breaks into the boy's house and finds his school yearbook with his classmates' faces crossed out and threatening words written about the school, and when Taub checks the contents of the boy's flash drive, he finds disturbing videos of him blowing up homemade pipe bombs and appearing to show misanthropic and sociopathic tendencies.

It is discovered that a piece of one of the bombs ended up lodged in his system, and the foreign material is what has caused his various medical maladies. Taub, however, is torn between sending the videos to the authorities throughout the case, but, in the end, decides to mail the flash drive to the police.

Meanwhile, Cuddy finds blood in her urine and undergoes tests for possible kidney cancer, while House grapples with emotionally supporting her, avoiding her, and denying that she is actually sick. Cuddy goes through several dreams that show first herself, House and the team in a parody of Two and a Half Men, then in a Zombie scenario where House kills his zombie colleagues, next a 1950s sitcom, followed by a Western version similar to Butch Cassidy and the Sundance Kid and finally, a musical number where House, who's wearing an outfit that's a combination of a ringmaster and a cabaret magician along with eyeliner, sings the song “Get Happy” accompanied by various dancers with Cuddy joining in. The number then abruptly ends with Cuddy awakening from a surgical procedure and learning that while she was unconscious, her kidney problems were found to be a benign tumor.

After speaking with her sister, Cuddy realizes that when House came to see her during her illness, he was under the influence of Vicodin. Realizing that he is unable to open up completely and share the pain that she considers to be part of any meaningful relationship, she ends their relationship.

The episode is concluded with a scene that echoes the last scene of the previous season's finale ("Help Me"): House is sitting on his bathroom floor with a bottle of Vicodin in his hand. He expectantly looks at the doorway. Resigned, and with no Cuddy to save him, he takes the pills.

== Critical response ==
Zack Handlen of The A.V. Club gave this episode a B+ rating, praising "Bombshells" despite the campy dream sequences.
