= Dual (Heroes) =

- Heroes episode
- Episode no.: Season 3 Episode 13
- Directed by: Greg Beeman
- Written by: Jeph Loeb
- Production code: 313
- Original air date: December 15, 2008

Guest appearances
- Jessalyn Gilsig as Meredith Gordon; Jamie Hector as Knox; Brea Grant as Daphne Millbrook; Blake Shields as Flint Gordon, Jr.; Ntare Mwine as Usutu; David H. Lawrence XVII as Eric Doyle; Chad Faust as Scott; Michael Dorn as President; Kiko Ellsworth as Echo DeMille; George Takei as Kaito Nakamura; Robert Forster as Arthur Petrelli; Franc Ross as Daniel Pine; Sekai Murashige as Young Hiro Nakamura

Episode chronology
← Previous "Our Father"	Next → "A Clear and Present Danger"
- Heroes season 3

"Dual" is the thirteenth episode and mid-season finale of the third season of the NBC superhero drama series Heroes and forty-seventh episode overall. The episode aired on December 15, 2008, as the conclusion to the "Volume 3: Villains" storyline. The episode, which was originally titled "War", is the final episode of the "Villains" story arc, and was the last episode to be written and produced by Jeph Loeb prior to his departure from Heroes in November 2008.

== Plot ==
At Pinehearst, Peter explains to Nathan that Sylar killed their father and it was the only way to stop his plan. Nathan reveals that he has taken over and warns Peter to stay out of the way, causing Peter to knock him unconscious. He then goes to destroy Mohinder's Pinehearst laboratory and all of the newly created formula.

Elsewhere, Ando, Daphne, and Matt go to Mohinder’s laboratory so that Ando can take the formula, gain the ability to travel through time and rescue a stranded Hiro. Unfortunately, Mohinder is at Pinehearst, so Daphne goes there to steal the formula.

At Pinehearst, Mohinder himself has discovered that his infection has spread to his lungs and his only hope of a cure is to take the formula. He is interrupted when Peter arrives to destroy the formula. During their discussion, Daphne steals a tube of formula from Mohinder's hand, which causes the pair to fight. Flint and Knox arrive to destroy the lab, rescuing Peter in the process. Flint explains that if other people gain powers they will become less special. Knox leaves to guard Nathan whilst Flint pins down Mohinder.

Upstairs, Scott wakes Nathan up and tells him he was the only Marine injected with the formula but Knox arrives and breaks Scott's neck. Eventually, Nathan fights Knox until Tracy arrives and saves him, freezing and killing Knox. She tries to persuade Nathan to leave before it's too late. He fires her and leaves.

Daphne returns to Mohinder’s old laboratory with the formula. Matt points out Ando could get any number of powers but Daphne points out she wanted to run and gained the ability to run. Matt worried about what people thought about him, and gained telepathy. Ando injects himself and then passes out. Upon awakening, he tries to travel in time but fails. In his frustration, he hits a table causing a red glow, which he cannot control. When Matt touches him, his telepathy powers get stronger, allowing him to hear thousands of voices. Daphne then touches him, and disappears, re-appearing moments earlier, something Matt explains is due to travelling faster than the speed of light. He goes on to point out that Ando's power is actually an ability supercharger and will allow them to go back in time to rescue Hiro.

In the past, Hiro climbs off the flagpole. He goes downstairs and finds Young Hiro holding the healed dove, and mourning the death of his mother. Hiro asks Young Hiro for his help finding a piece of paper with numbers and figures: the formula. He promises Young Hiro he can save tomorrow and Young Hiro agrees. They manage to get into the safe, taking the formula, when Kaito catches them. He sends Young Hiro to bed and attacks Hiro with a sword. Hiro rips the formula in half and is rescued by Daphne and Ando before Kaito can kill him. Unfortunately, Hiro dropped the two halves of the formula in the past and Kaito retrieves them.

Daphne returns Ando and Hiro to the present. Ando explains that he now has powers and Hiro says that he was about to destroy the formula. Daphne takes Hiro to Pinehearst to retrieve it in the present. They arrive to find Tracy has frozen open Arthur’s safe and has the formula. Hiro forcibly takes the formula, knocking Tracy out when she insults him.

At Pinehearst, Peter is demolishing the laboratory and Mohinder warns him that the formula is highly combustible, before Flint throws him against a wall, stunning him. Flint and Peter tip over the main tank of formula, which spills over Mohinder and wakes him up. His mutated skin fades away while Flint prepares to blow the place up. Peter wants to get the people out, but Flint says he doesn’t care. Nathan hits him over the head, stunning him, and then punches Peter and knocks his legs out from under him. Flint wakes up and ignites the puddles of formula, setting the lab ablaze. Peter grabs a dose of the formula and injects himself, gaining himself an ability, then flies with Nathan into the sky just as the laboratory explodes.

At Primatech, Noah, Angela, Claire and Meredith discover that the security guards are dead and the building is on emergency lockdown. Sylar tells them over the loudspeakers that he's killed Arthur and that he's now going to show them that they are all monsters like him. The group arms themselves and split up to find Sylar.

Claire and Angela enter the study, while Noah and Meredith reach the surveillance room. Sylar informs them that they’re not hunting him: he’s hunting them. He offers Claire a chance to escape with Noah and Meredith if she kills Angela. When Claire refuses, Sylar tells her to talk to Noah about how he and Elle turned him into a monster. After considering Angela for a brief moment, Claire cocks the shotgun and shoots the intercom instead, and she labels Sylar as the true monster.

Meanwhile, Noah releases Eric Doyle, Danny Pine, and Echo DeMille from Level 5. Noah tells them that he’ll let the person who kills Sylar walk free, and Sylar will kill them if they try to escape. As they leave, Meredith warns they don’t stand a chance, and Noah explains that they’ll work as bait.

Meredith makes her way through the hallways and finds Danny Pine’s severed, partially metallic arm. Sylar appears behind Meredith and telekinetically throws away Meredith’s gun. Eric Doyle appears and takes control of Sylar before Sylar overpowers him, leaving him lying on the ground bleeding from his nose. He then injects Meredith with adrenaline.

Noah finds Echo DeMille dead and Meredith in a cell, flaming out of control. Noah joins her, setting down his gun, when Sylar removes the clip (leaving one bullet) and shuts them in. He tells Noah to make a choice, Meredith's life or his own.

Sylar transmits an image of Noah and Meredith to Claire. Angela warns her that Sylar wants them to go down there but Claire doesn’t care. They make their way down the hallway but Sylar abducts Angela and then ambushes Claire. Claire runs away to the cell, where she finds Sylar has ripped out the keypad. Noah tells Meredith to concentrate her heat in her hands and press her hands to the glass. Noah then uses his bullet on the now weakened glass, which cracks and Claire uses her weight to break through. Claire and Noah go after Sylar, promising to return for Meredith.

Sylar confronts Angela, who tells him that he’s a hero for killing Arthur and saving the world. He asks if she’s his mother, telling her that he will know if she is lying, so she admits she’s not his mother. She explains she needed him to work for the Company and saw him as a killer and a monster that could be manipulated. He starts choking her and she says she knows who his real parents are. Before Angela can tell him, Claire comes up behind Sylar and stabs him in the back of the head with a piece of glass. An alarm goes off and Noah arrives and says they need to leave now. Claire tells her father to get Angela out and goes to see Meredith. Meredith is blazing out of control and tells her to go, and Noah arrives to tell her she has to leave. They leave Meredith behind. And run out of the hallway as flames sweep through the building.

"Volume Three" ends with a narration by Mohinder, overlapped with images of the surviving characters. Peter drops Nathan to the ground, and Nathan asks why Peter saved him. Peter insists he loves him and Nathan says it isn’t what he would have done. Mohinder is walking down the highway and a car pulls over to pick him up. He sees himself reflected in a car window, restored to normal. Tracy opens the door and implies he should get in. Hiro and Daphne return to Mohinder’s old laboratory and Hiro tears up the formula. Matt and Daphne embrace, and Hiro and Ando bow to each other. Matt looks up and sees a vision of Usutu looking on. Claire, Noah, and Angela watch the Company Headquarters of Primatech burn, and Claire cries, knowing Meredith is still inside. The main idea to the ending of this volume is that both companies that "helped" those with powers are gone, and with the title 'Fugitives' for the next volume, those with powers may be hunted.

=== Volume Four: Fugitives ===
"Volume Four" begins three weeks later. Nathan meets with someone in a limousine in Washington, D.C. Nathan says their only option is to get the U.S. government involved. The other man is going over files of Tracy, Micah Sanders, Mohinder, Matt, and Hiro, telling him there are many others with powers. Nathan says all the evidence the man needs is there, and he wants to put them in a facility where they won’t be a danger to anyone. The man agrees to get them whatever they need. Nathan gets out and says, “Thank you, Mr. President.” The camera then pans out to reveal the President, portrayed by Michael Dorn.

== Critical reception ==
Steve Heisler of The A.V. Club rated this episode a D.

Robert Canning of IGN gave the episode 6.6 out of 10.
