= Proud American =

2008 film by Fred Ashman

- Theatrical release poster
- Directed by: Fred Ashman
- Written by: Fred Ashman
- Produced by: Aili Kato
- Starring: Hayley Chase
- Cinematography: Mark Eberle
- Edited by: Tim Flora
- Music by: Stan Beard
- Distributed by: Slowhand Cinema
- Release date: September 12, 2008
- Running time: 105 minutes
- Country: United States
- Language: English
- Box office: $131,357

Proud American is a 2008 biographical drama film released by Slowhand Cinema, in both conventional 35mm, and IMAX format. It features five stories that intend to capture the essence of the American spirit, two of them chronicling the founding of Wal-Mart and Coca-Cola. The film is the lowest-grossing wide release in movie history, and was noted for having obtained additional revenue through overt sponsorship of the two companies, as well as MasterCard and American Airlines, whose product placement can be observed throughout the film.

== Reception ==
=== Box office ===
The film was not well-received financially. Opening in 750 theaters, Proud American managed to earn only $96,076, or $128 per venue — making it the lowest-grossing opening weekend for a wide release in since box office tracking began.

=== Critical reception ===
On review aggregator website Rotten Tomatoes, the film has an approval rating of 10%, based on 10 reviews, with an average rating of 2.9/10.
