= Out of the Chute =

- House episode
- Episode no.: Season 7 Episode 16
- Directed by: Sanford Bookstaver
- Written by: Lawrence Kaplow; Thomas L. Moran
- Original air date: March 14, 2011

Guest appearances
- Chad Faust as Lane; Cleo Berry as Carnell; Noelle Bellinghausen as Emily

Episode chronology
← Previous "Bombshells"	Next → "Fall from Grace"
- House season 7

"Out of the Chute" is the sixteenth episode of the seventh season of the American medical drama House. It aired on Fox on March 14, 2011.

== Plot ==
Newly single and back on Vicodin, House checks into a hotel for the five-star treatment, leaving his team to diagnose a professional bull-rider (Chad Faust) who was attacked by a bull after suffering a seizure. House admits to Wilson that he is taking Vicodin again, and that he needs help - but he insists that prostitutes will help him more than counselling. He proceeds to check in with the team telephonically while in the company of a variety of women. As the episode progresses, House continues to seek more and more thrills, which worries Wilson so he offers that House should move back in with him, which House declines. Wilson asks Cuddy to talk to House, but she refuses.

Diagnosing the bull-rider is difficult due to his various previous injuries which render MRI technology and other diagnostics useless or extremely dangerous. House instructs the team to do more aggressive tests with increasingly higher risk to the patient: an MRI test despite the metal rod in his ribcage, which causes the metal to superheat; removing the plate in his skull to do a CT scan; and finally forcing his aortic valve to rupture during surgery to identify a weak spot in the valve in time to repair it. When the patient wakes up after surgery, Masters asks him out, having been attracted to him for most of the diagnostic process. The patient is embarrassed and does not respond.

At the end of the episode, House takes more Vicodin and then jumps from the balcony of his hotel room into the pool to do a cannonball while Wilson watches in shock.

== Reception ==
Television Without Pity gave the episode a C. The A.V. Club gave it a B+.
