= Changes (House) =

- House episode
- Episode no.: Season 7 Episode 20
- Directed by: David Straiton
- Story by: Eli Attie; Seth Hoffman
- Teleplay by: Eli Attie
- Original air date: May 2, 2011

Guest appearances
- Donal Logue as Cyrus Harry; David Costabile as Phil Harry; Megan Follows as the fake Jennifer Williams; Candice Bergen as Arlene Cuddy

Episode chronology
← Previous "Last Temptation"	Next → "The Fix"
- House season 7

"Changes" is the twentieth episode of the seventh season of the American medical drama series House. It aired on May 2, 2011 on Fox.

== Plot ==
The team takes on the case of a lottery winner, Cyrus Harry (Donal Logue), suffering from paralysis and multiple types of cancer, and they must figure out if it is his new millionaire lifestyle that is making him sick. The newly rich Cyrus was looking for love, specifically running through a list of ladies named Jennifer Williams, as he hopes to find the Jennifer who was his Jersey shore summer fling 23 years earlier. He believes that with his fortune he will be able to stop being miserable and find happiness. Jennifer (Megan Follows) arrives at the hospital, having read about Cyrus in the news. Due to Thirteen's suspicion of Jennifer, eventually it is revealed that the "Jennifer" by Cyrus' side is a fraud, and part of a scheme set up by Cyrus' cousin, Phil (David Costabile), to scam Cyrus out of his newfound fortune. However at the end of the episode, House and Thirteen watch on as the real Jennifer arrives at the hospital, perhaps being Cyrus' real chance at happiness.

Meanwhile, Cuddy's mother Arlene threatens to sue the hospital over the slow recovery from her hip-replacement surgery ("Family Practice"), which causes tension between herself, House, and Cuddy. It is revealed that she did it in hopes that it would unite Cuddy and House against her as a common enemy, therefore encouraging them to get back together. Cuddy's issues with her mother are resolved but House assures her that he and Cuddy will not be getting back together.

Foreman tells Chase that he is repressed, and too easily lets others anger him, while Chase himself is feeling happier due to putting a stop to his promiscuous ways and having sworn off sex altogether. They wager a bet to see who can better change the ugly parts of their personalities; Chase begins hooking Foreman up to a blood pressure monitor during differentials to measure how much he is bothered by his teammates, especially House. One time, Chase cheats and manipulates the monitor, while twice Foreman cheats the test. It is shown at the end of the episode that Chase also cheated, and he is still having sex with new women.

Thirteen believes that neither the money or Jennifer will be able to make Cyrus happy because each person's level of happiness or sadness is set into their DNA - with nothing being able to change it. Her cynical mood both intrigues and surprises House, who has a similar outlook. House actively begins trying to deduce why Thirteen's outlook on Cyrus and Jennifer's romance is so jaded. He brings her old high-school boyfriend to the hospital thinking that being dumped caused her to not believe that love can be rekindled - however it turns out he dumped her because she hooked up with his sister instead. Thirteen tells House, "Here's the dirty little secret. I just think we are who we are. And I think lotteries are stupid."

After observing Cyrus' reunion with the real Jennifer, Thirteen tells House that even if he gets screwed over again, because of his hope Cyrus will always be intrinsically happy. House comments that after everything Thirteen has been through, her outlook is a defense mechanism because if she can convince herself that she would have been miserable either way, she does not have to hate the universe for handing her a losing ticket. Thirteen points out that House is similarly miserable, and reiterates, "We are who we are. Lotteries are stupid."

== Reception ==
=== Critical response ===
The A.V. Club gave the episode a C+ rating.
