= Moving On (House) =

- House episode
- Episode no.: Season 7 Episode 23
- Directed by: Greg Yaitanes
- Written by: Katherine Lingenfelter; Peter Blake
- Original air date: May 23, 2011

Guest appearances
- Paula Marshall as Julia Cuddy; Jennifer Crystal Foley as Rachel Taub; James Hiroyuki Liao as Luca; Thom Bishops as Jerry Barrett; Zena Grey as Nurse Ruby; J.R. Cacia as Officer Soltes; Shohreh Aghdashloo as Afsoun Hamidi

Episode chronology
← Previous "After Hours"	Next → "Twenty Vicodin"
- House season 7

"Moving On" is the twenty-third and last episode of the seventh season of the American medical drama House. It aired on Fox on May 23, 2011. It was the last episode of House to feature Lisa Edelstein as Lisa Cuddy.

== Plot ==
The team treats a performance artist, Afsoun Hamidi (Shohreh Aghdashloo), with an unknown sickness who deliberately induced additional symptoms unrelated to her illness in herself, with the aim of turning the diagnostics department into her new masterpiece via hidden cameras. House must decide which of her symptoms are real, and which are self-inflicted. While getting coffee, a man named Jerry runs into Cuddy who happens to be her sister's banker. She wants to set up Cuddy with him. Cuddy denies who she is and tells Julia to stay out of her personal life. As the case progresses, House vows to make changes in his life, but remains rooted in old habits. Cuddy and House have lunch, where she tries to make him talk about how he felt after their break up. She also tells him that she is not dating anyone. House tells Cuddy that he feels hurt but it's not her fault. Cuddy goes back to the coffee shop where she runs into Jerry again, she apologizes about the other day because she had some personal things going on in her life and wasn't at her best.

Meanwhile, Taub is avoiding calls from Rachel, his ex-wife, while he tries to figure out the best way to tell her that his new girlfriend, Ruby, a nurse at the hospital, is pregnant, and that he plans on staying with her exclusively and raising the child. Finally, Rachel visits the hospital to talk to him, and before Taub can tell her, she unexpectedly informs him that she is also pregnant.

After the case, House drives with Wilson to Cuddy's home to return her a hairbrush she requested. He arrives at her home, and notices her with Jerry and her family. House gets angered at her supposed betrayal, and returns to his car, forces Wilson out and proceeds to drive away. He suddenly turns back at the end of the street. Wilson thinks that he is going to pull over, but House turns and crashes into Cuddy's house, destroying her empty dining room in the process. He gets out of the car to see Cuddy and the others looking at him, shocked, as he gives her the hairbrush and walks away. At the end of the episode, House is seen drinking at a bar on a tropical beach. He walks to the edge of the shoreline, looking across the ocean at the sunset, and then walks away as "Got Nuffin'" by Spoon plays.

== Reception ==
=== Ratings ===
The episode was watched by 9.11 million viewers in the United States.

=== Critical reception ===
The A.V. Club rated this episode C+. The car crash scene was named by TV Guide in its list of the worst of 2011, saying "Although we love condescending, acerbic and self-destructive House, we always felt that at heart, he was a good (if massively dysfunctional) guy. We could not, however, forgive his complete disregard for human life when he rammed his car into Cuddy's house in a jealous pique. What was that? Did we miss the shark that his car jumped over because this over-the-top action certainly felt like a cry for help — and not just from his character."
