= Our Father (Heroes) =

- Heroes episode
- Episode no.: Season 3 Episode 12
- Directed by: Jeannot Szwarc
- Written by: Adam Armus and Kay Foster
- Production code: 312
- Original air date: December 8, 2008

Guest appearances
- Kristen Bell as Elle Bishop; Ashley Crow as Sandra Bennet; Jimmy Jean-Louis as the Haitian; Brea Grant as Daphne Millbrook; Jamie Hector as Knox; Blake Shields as Flint Gordon, Jr.; Tamlyn Tomita as Ishi Nakamura; Chad Faust as Scott; Edward Carnevale as Dispatcher; Elizabeth Ann Bennett as Sue Landers; George Takei as Kaito Nakamura; Robert Forster as Arthur Petrelli; Sekai Murashige as Young Hiro Nakamura; Brian Skala as David Sullivan; Cole Williams as Ryan Hanover; Taylor Cole as Rachel Mills; James Dever as Marine; Ewan Chung as Office Worker #4; Clara and Melinda Handy as baby Claire

Episode chronology
← Previous "The Eclipse"	Next → "Dual"
- Heroes season 3

"Our Father" is the 12th episode of the third season of the NBC superhero drama series Heroes. The episode aired on December 8, 2008.

== Plot ==
Hiro and Claire witness Kaito's past self giving her as a baby to Noah Bennet and after hearing his mother's voice, Hiro runs inside to see her. He witnesses his mother healing a sick dove and realizes that she has the power of healing and may be able to restore his memories with it. The two witness a conversation where Kaito and Ishi converse in English so Hiro can't understand them where it's revealed that Ishi Nakamaura was the catalyst before Claire and while she wants to give it to Hiro as she's dying, Kaito thinks he's too irresponsible and plans to give it to baby Claire. Claire goes to stop her parents from allowing her to get the catalyst while Hiro goes to get his mother to heal him and give his memories back.

In the present Sylar immolates Elle's dead body and plans to use the list of evolved humans in her cell phone as a new list for him to track down and steal powers from. Sylar kills a woman named Sue Landers and steals her power of lie detection in order to find out if Arthur and Angela really are his parents after all.

At The Company Angela gives Peter a gun and tells him to go with The Haitian and kill Arthur by shooting him through the head, the only thing that can kill him. Peter is reluctant but both The Haitian and Angela tell him that killing Arthur is the only way as he's too powerful to be contained and he reluctantly agrees.

At Pinehearst Nathan arrives to take over saying he's willing to help but wants to be in charge, a clause which Arthur reluctantly agrees to. Nathan speaks with a Marine named Scott who's one of the people intended to receive the formula and learns his motivations for volunteering.

Sixteen years in the past, Claire, pretending to be "Bonnie, the neighbors' niece", helps a younger Sandra care for her past self only to be found out by Noah, who knows the neighbors have no niece. Claire tells him that she is there to protect the family and tells him enough about the future and how much he is going to care for her to convince him not to take the phone call that results in her becoming the catalyst. When Claire mentions the baby is Noah's "Claire Bear," Noah suspects that "Bonnie" is the baby Claire all grown up and, finally trusting Present Claire, hangs up the phone.

Hiro tries to make his mother tamagoyaki to eat after being mistaken for a chef, but when he doesn't know how to make what she wants, he makes her waffles. During a conversation with her he convinces her of his identity and she agrees to try to use her power to restore his memories. She is successful and Hiro gets his memories back. Hiro convinces her to give him the catalyst as well and, after she does, she dies.

Hiro and Claire reunite on the roof, but Arthur arrives and steals Hiro's power and the catalyst before throwing him off the building. Arthur sends Claire back to her time telling her to deliver a message to Angela that he won, then teleports back to Pinehearst where he adds the catalyst to a vat of formula. We then see that Hiro managed to catch a flagpole while falling, and has survived.

In New York Matt, Ando, and Daphne try to get Isaac's sketchbook. After the bike messenger manager runs away, they get it and find the outline for a story revealing that Hiro will be lost in time. Ando, Daphne, and Matt decide to use the formula to make another time traveler to rescue Hiro. Ando plans to be that time traveler, but needs to figure out how to find the formula and gain the power.

As Mohinder injects Scott to test the formula, Arthur senses a disturbance and goes to his office to find Peter waiting for him. He tries to disarm him, but his powers are blocked by The Haitian who's also there, but Arthur's too powerful for The Haitian to block for long and he urges Peter to shoot Arthur. Arthur tries to entice Peter into changing sides by promising to use the formula to restore his powers, but Peter refuses and fires when Arthur insults him. Arthur gains back his powers at that moment and slashes Peter's cheek, but misses the bullet and is only saved by the intervention of Sylar, who stops the bullet in mid-air. Sylar again asks if Arthur is his father. When Arthur says, "Yes," Sylar determines that he's lying. Sylar telekinetically drives the bullet along its original trajectory, striking Arthur through the head and killing him. The catalyst leaves Arthur's body while Peter stands over him, fading away. Sylar leaves Peter alone saying Peter no longer has anything he wants. Peter sends the Haitian after Sylar.

In the lab, the test proves to be a success and Scott gets the power of super-strength.

== Critical reception ==
Steve Heisler of The A.V. Club rated this episode a B.

Robert Canning of IGN gave the episode 8.4 out of 10.
