= A Pox on Our House =

- House episode
- Episode no.: Season 7 Episode 7
- Directed by: Tucker Gates
- Written by: Lawrence Kaplow
- Original air date: November 15, 2010

Guest appearances
- Cynthia Watros as Dr. Sam Carr; Samantha Smith as Lulu; Andrew Fiscella as Niles; Hayley Chase as Julie; Aaron Refvem as Roger; Devon Woods as Eve; Tess Kartel as Geerte; Dylan Baker as Dr. Dave Broda; Neil Sandilands as Captain Vanderhoof

Episode chronology
← Previous "Office Politics"	Next → "Small Sacrifices"
- House season 7

"A Pox on Our House" is the seventh episode of the seventh season of the American medical drama House. It aired on Fox on November 15, 2010.

== Plot ==
In the 18th century, the Sotos Oosterzoon, a Dutch slave ship, travels to Bermuda. There is an outbreak of smallpox among the African captives and, fearing quarantine, the crew throw the slaves overboard but it is too late: the ship is fired upon and intentionally sunk, along with its crew and captives, in order to contain the disease.

In modern day, a family on vacation dive into the wreckage of the slave ship. A teen girl brings a sealed glass jar back up from the wreck. She accidentally breaks the jar, cutting herself and exposing herself to the contents of the jar: scabs from the diseased captives.

House is certain that the disease is smallpox, coming immediately to the same diagnosis as the crew. The family is quarantined, the girl and father, being especially compromised, are put in an isolation room, and the team administers the smallpox vaccine to the two.

As soon as the tell-tale blisters begin to appear, the CDC is called per protocol and institutes a lockdown. As the lockdown is occurring, the team discovers a rash on the girl's armpits inconsistent with smallpox, causing House to change his diagnosis.

Dr. Dave Broda, the CDC official overseeing the case, blocks House's team from contact with the patients to make a new diagnosis, so they turn to the only other evidence they have: the captain's logs from the wrecked slave vessel. House enlists the aid of a translator, a Dutch webcam stripper he finds on the internet.

Based on the information in the logs, House is reconfirmed in his opinion that the girl does not have smallpox. House attempts to lie to get his team into the room to test his hypothesis, but is stopped. Masters, although unable to closely examine the patient, notices that the girl lacks the characteristic pustules that would be expected from smallpox.

Meanwhile, the boy's father begins to develop smallpox symptoms as well, but more characteristic symptoms. House is confounded as to why it appears that the girl does not have smallpox after all, but her father does. He concludes that the father contracted the disease from the smallpox vaccine they gave him. Unbeknownst to them, the father's immune system has been compromised by the return of his kidney cancer (which had been in remission).

House demands they administer the treatment for the smallpox variola. When Broda refuses, House risks his own life by entering the containment room and administers the treatment to save the patient. However, the father does not respond to the medication and dies. House figures now that the disease was likely smallpox after all, and also realizes that he has consequently exposed himself.

The rest of the team is despondent, but Masters returns to the journal in desperate search for another diagnosis. She notes that a cat on the ship had lost all his fur and then died, strong evidence for rickettsialpox, a disease easily treatable with antibiotics. Masters tasks House with searching the father's body for eschars. When House successfully spots eschars on the body, Broda orders that the daughter be treated with doxycycline, saving her life.

In a subplot, Wilson and Sam reexamine their relationship while treating a young chemotherapy patient whose mother gets locked outside of the hospital during the lockdown. House and Cuddy also face relationship difficulties after Cuddy discovers House lied to her in "Office Politics" in order to administer an unconventional treatment of Hepatitis C (an injection of Hepatitis A) to a patient.

== Critical response ==
The A.V. Club gives this episode a score of B−.

== See also ==
- These Aren't The Droids You're Looking For
