= A Solitary Blue =

1983 novel by Cynthia Voigt

- First edition, (publ. Atheneum Books)
- Author: Cynthia Voigt
- Publication date: July 1, 1983
- Awards: Newbery Honor (1984)
- Preceded by: Dicey's Song
- Followed by: The Runner

A Solitary Blue (1983) is a novel by Cynthia Voigt. It was a Newbery Honor book in 1984. It is the third book of the Tillerman Cycle, set concurrently with Dicey's Song and Come a Stranger. It revolves around Jeff Greene, a boy who struggles after being abandoned by his mother at age 7.

== Plot ==
At 7 years old, Jeff Greene comes home from school to find a note from his mother, Melody Hittinger, telling him that she had to leave for a while and for him to not be sad. Left with his reserved father, the Professor, the burgeoning Jeff fails to make human connections. In sixth grade, Jeff catches the flu and tries to hide it from the Professor, in hopes of it not disturbing his routine.

That summer, Melody asks him to visit her in Charleston, South Carolina for the summer. He connects with her and has a wonderful time, bringing joy back in his life. After his visit, he writes letters to Melody on the first day of each month, even though she never writes back. For Christmas, he sends Melody a beautiful scarf but receives nothing from her in return. Jeff convinces himself to excuse Melody for ignoring him, and he continues to love her.

On his second summer visit one year later, Melody spends little time with Jeff. Instead, she focuses on a new boyfriend, named Max. The second visit shows Jeff that Melody does not care about him. Frustrated, he buys a boat and goes to a solitary, remote island. There he sees a blue heron and relates it to his own life. When Jeff returns home to Baltimore, he isolates himself.

In eighth grade, Jeff begins to fail his classes and starts skipping classes to ride a local amusement park ride. After his father, Horace, finds out the truth, he decides to make a change for Jeff's good. The two move to a cabin located near Crisfield. Jeff loves the cabin, mainly because he has spotted another blue heron on the property.

Repeating eighth grade at his new school, Jeff makes two good friends, Phil and Andy, gets his life back on track. He takes an interest in schoolwork, and learns how to play the guitar, which fosters a new relationship with his father. These changes underscore Jeff learning to accept himself.

After two years in Crisfield, Jeff meets Mina Smiths, and the Tillermans: Dicey, Sammy, Maybeth, and James. Jeff seduces Dicey with his guitar skills, and soon bonds with Sammy through Dicey's job at a local grocery store, Maybeth when he visits Dicey's house to observe Maybeth's talent, and James through birdwatching.

As Jeff finally forms human connections, Melody abruptly returns to his life and Jeff realizes that he never needed her love in order to be happy.

== Themes ==
Jeff deals with anxiety from the trauma of his mother's absence in his life throughout the novel. He worries that his father will also abandon him, which his father's indifference to everything ("it wouldn't make any difference") confirms. As Jeff ages, he deals with this anxiety in different manners: at first, he mimics his father's indifference, but eventually that becomes too much and he falls into a depression. Only once he forms meaningful relationships—with his father and with his new friends in Crisfield—he works through his complicated feelings.

The novel nicely lends itself to a Freudian analysis. Melody leaves when Jeff is 7 years old in second grade. To Freud, this is just after completion of the phallic stage and the development of the Oedipus complex. The Oedipus complex is traditionally resolved when the son identifies with the father and develops a healthy libidinal relationship with the mother. In A Solitary Blue, the disappearance of Melody prevents the Oedipus complex from properly forming. When Melody reenters Jeff's life, he first expresses his unconscious desire—his first words to her after seeing her for the first time in five years were, "I'd forgotten how beautiful you are." But just as the Oedipus complex is revived in Jeff, he meets Melody's new boyfriend, Max, who awakens a deep castration anxiety in him. It's only after both the Oedipus complex and the castration anxiety are central to Jeff's unconscious that he develops his neuroses and falls into a deep depression. Since Jeff is unable to identify with neither the reserved Horace nor the negligent Max, he's unable to resolve his feelings, and he ultimately fails eighth grade. Only once Jeff and Horace move to Crisfield and develop an intimate relationship, and Jeff meets Dicey, does Jeff resolve the Oedipus complex in the latency stage. Now, Jeff is able to identify with his father, and he projects his psychosexual feelings from his mother onto Dicey. Notably with Dicey, he reappropriates the guitar that previously was symbolic of his relationship of his mother, to something that symbolizes his relationship with her.

== Awards ==
- Newbery Medal Honor Book in 1984
