= Small Sacrifices (House) =

- House episode
- Episode no.: Season 7 Episode 8
- Directed by: Greg Yaitanes
- Written by: David Hoselton
- Original air date: November 22, 2010

Guest appearances
- Cynthia Watros as Dr. Sam Carr; Jennifer Crystal Foley as Rachel Taub; Kayla Ewell as Nika; Stella Maeve as Kenzie; Nigel Gibbs as Sanford Wells; Madalyn Horcher as Marisa Silva; Kuno Becker as Ramón Silva

Episode chronology
← Previous "A Pox on Our House"	Next → "Larger than Life"
- House season 7

"Small Sacrifices" is the eighth episode of the seventh season of the American medical drama House. It aired on Fox on November 22, 2010.

== Plot ==
A patient is admitted to Princeton Plainsboro after reenacting the Crucifixion. The patient reveals that he crucified himself to honor a bargain he made with God for curing his daughter's cancer.

Cuddy walls House for an apology about lying to her and also pulls him for the wedding dinner of the hospital's chairman-of-board. He is interrupted from being at the rehearsal when the patient refuses to do the treatment involving stem cells due to religious reasons. At the suggestion of Masters, House asks to get the patient's daughter to see him to try to convince him to take the treatment but he refuses. After the wedding dinner, House visits the patient and tells him that his daughter's CT scans were unable to detect spots of remaining tumor and the PET scans that he did on her just now revealed that she has tiny cancers. He concludes that the patient should receive the treatment because God had already broken the bargain. Embittered, the patient agrees. Later on, House reveals to the patient that he had been lying about the PET scan having cancer on it but points out that the patient is recovering anyway. The patient responds by stating that not only God exists, it just means that God is truly merciful, much to the chagrin of House.

Wilson does a favor for Sam in checking her case files for work, in which irregularities are found with radiation doses given to terminal patients, but he plans to accept her doing it because of the nature of their condition and propose to Sam at the wedding. Sam, steadfast in her belief that she told the truth about not giving them the wrong dosage (and believing that Wilson doesn't believe her), dumps him, packs up her stuff and leaves without attempting to resolve things by stating that she doesn't want to go down the road she thinks it is going, while Wilson retorts she is basically quitting.

Taking a cue from the patient about faith not being an argument and taking it to be about trust, House apologizes to Cuddy and asks for a leap of faith, promising never to lie to her again. That night, Wilson comes over to House's apartment. House tells him that he apologized to Cuddy but in fact he was lying again.

== Music ==
- "Shark in the Water" by V V Brown
- "I Know" by Jude
- "You Mean the World to Me" by Toni Braxton
- "Love Rollercoaster" by The Ohio Players

== Reception ==
=== Critical response ===
The A.V. Club gave this episode a B− rating.

IGN gave the episode 6.5 out of 10.
