= Office Politics (House) =

- House episode
- Episode no.: Season 7 Episode 6
- Directed by: Sanford Bookstaver
- Written by: Seth Hoffman
- Original air date: November 8, 2010

Guest appearances
- Jack Coleman as Joe Dugan; Tracy Vilar as Nurse Regina; Pat Finn as Senator Hal Anderson

Episode chronology
← Previous "Unplanned Parenthood"	Next → "A Pox on Our House"
- House season 7

"Office Politics" is the sixth episode of the seventh season of the American medical drama House. It aired on Fox on November 8, 2010. It is also the first episode to feature Amber Tamblyn as Martha Masters, as a replacement of Thirteen (Olivia Wilde).

== Plot ==
New Jersey senator Hal Anderson's campaign manager Joe Dugan (played by Jack Coleman) falls ill with liver failure and temporary paralysis.

Meanwhile, Cuddy pressures House to add a female doctor to his team but eventually tells him that she has chosen for him: a third-year med student named Martha Masters, who is a genius. Taub appears to have a problem with Masters, which Foreman and Chase try to figure out. Throughout the episode, House keeps firing and rehiring Masters, rehiring her whenever he needs her for an idea, and firing her again as soon as he's done talking to her.

Masters suggests a neuroendocrine tumor, and the team also considers DIC. The team give Joe an MRI to look for a tumor, but don't find one. Taub runs Joe's blood, which also comes back normal. Looking at the senator on TV delivering a speech, House suspects the senator has Hepatitis C, and thinks that he's had sex with Joe, and thinks Joe has Hepatitis C as well. He gives Joe interferon, but Joe doesn't get better. Masters notes that a German research study has shown that 15% of people with Hepatitis C who have been injected with Hepatitis A got better. When Cuddy says trying this exposes the hospital to liability, Masters tells her that she's being a coward.

Foreman and Chase eventually find out that Taub dislikes Masters because he interviewed her for Hopkins Med School for an hour and she didn't remember him, even though she remembered the 20th decimal place of Euler's number. At the end of the episode, Taub learns the truth about Masters. She did remember him but felt awkward reminding him, and he mumbles "Is this Grandma's tea cosy?", a reference to an earlier conversation Masters had with House (involving if one would lie to their grandma about a tea cozy being a good gift).

House takes the senator's blood and runs it under Joe's name to get Cuddy to approve on his decision, despite Wilson's warnings that lying to her would be wrong now that they are involved. House also hires Masters in the end, saying she had him when she called Cuddy a coward. The show ends with Cuddy going to the nurses station to check up on House and discovering his lie. She is very visibly upset.

== Reception ==
=== Critical response ===
Zack Handlen of The A.V. Club graded "Office Politics" a B+. He praised Amber Tamblyn's portrayal of the new Masters character. Handlen writes, "A lot of the credit here goes to Tamblyn, who plays Martha as a collection of tics and insecurities but with a strong, immutable center. This is a character type that appears regularly on other shows (and I'm sure we've seen variations on House before in patient form), but this is the first time we have a major female role who isn't a sexy lady who uses her sexiness to sex up the place. Tamblyn is adorable in her way, but she's also young, vulnerable, and distinctive, and there's something vital in her confrontations with House."

=== Ratings ===
This episode was watched by 9.63 million U.S. viewers. 2.37 million Canadians watched this episode, ranking seventh for the week.
