= Aimee Walker Pond =

American gymnast

- Full name: Aimee Patricia Walker
- Born: March 10, 1983 (age 43) Tarzana, California, U.S.

Gymnastics career
- Discipline: Women's artistic gymnastics

Aimee Patricia Walker Pond (born March 10, 1983) is an American gymnast. A graduate of Brigham Young University, Pond has been involved in gymnastics since the age of eight. She is completely deaf and is blind in her right eye, making her one of a very few disabled gymnasts who have competed at the national level (another is Marie Roethlisberger). Some have compared her to Helen Keller to which Pond has responded "She's so wonderful, but I am glad I'm not Helen Keller, I'm so lucky- I have my one eye."

When Pond was seven years old, she watched her cousins practicing at a gymnastics center, and asked her mother if she could take classes with them. At age eight, her mother enrolled her in classes instructing her not to use sign language in front of anyone. After the coach noticed Pond did not respond when spoken to, she talked to Pond's mother and said she would like Pond to be on the team.

Pond is a Latter-day Saint. She graduated from Mountain View High School in Orem, Utah. She had transferred there from California to be near her coach Mary Wright, and her parents lived in Valley Village, California at that time.

Pond began her college career as a gymnast at the University of California, Los Angeles. She transferred to BYU in 2005, redshirted a year, and then competed in 2006 and 2007. Walker did not compete in 2008 due to a shoulder injury.

Pond has competed at the national and international level in addition to her collegiate experiences. At the Junior Olympic National Championships in 1999, she placed 19th overall with event placements of 6th on floor and 9th on bars. Her career high scores are a 9.715 on vault, earned February 2, 2006, and a 9.825 on bars, earned March 9, 2007. She did not compete during the 2008 season due to a shoulder injury.

At age 14, Pond had a role in the movie Little Girls in Pretty Boxes and reprised her role as Lili from Season 2 of Baywatch in season 9 Episode 10. She enjoys hiking, basketball, and spending time with her family, including her husband Derek Pond.

Pond was one of the listed performers on Harris Communications' Sign and Sing DVD of songs in sign language. She has coached at Champion Sports Center in Lehi, Utah.
