= Metallosis =

Medical condition

Metallosis is the medical condition involving deposition and build-up of metal debris in the soft tissues of the body.

Metallosis has been known to occur when metallic components in medical implants, specifically joint replacements, abrade against one another. Metallosis has also been observed in some patients either sensitive to the implant or for unknown reasons even in the absence of malpositioned prosthesis. Though rare, metallosis has been observed at an estimated incidence of 5% of metal joint implant patients over the last 40 years. Women may be at slightly higher risk than men. If metallosis occurs, it may involve the hip and knee joints, the shoulder, wrist, elbow joints, or spine. In the spine, the wear debris and resulting inflammatory reaction may result in a mass often referred to as a "metalloma" in medical literature, which may lead to neurological impairment over time. A similar condition has been also described when titanium dental implant degradation occurs leading to inflammatory titanium particle-mediated Peri-implantitis. Titanium particles in the peri-implant tissues do not occur via functional abrasion but are thought to result from damaging hygiene procedures or due to complex electrochemical interactions caused by oral bacteria.

The abrasion of metal components may cause metal ions to be solubilized. The hypothesis that the immune system identifies the metal ions as foreign bodies and inflames the area around the debris may be incorrect because of the small size of metal ions may prevent them from becoming haptens. Poisoning from metallosis is rare, but cobaltism is an established health concern. The involvement of the immune system in this putative condition has also been theorized but has never been proven.

Purported symptoms of metallosis generally include pain around the site of the implant, pseudotumors (a mass of inflamed cells that resembles a tumor but is actually collected fluids), and a noticeable rash that indicates necrosis. The damaged and inflamed tissue can also contribute to loosening the implant or medical device. Metallosis can cause dislocation of non-cemented implants as the healthy tissue that would normally hold the implant in place is weakened or destroyed. Metallosis has been demonstrated to cause osteolysis.

Women, those who are small in stature, and the obese are at greater risk for metallosis because their body structure causes more tension on the implant, quickening the abrasion of the metal components and the subsequent build-up of metallic debris.

== Physical effects and symptoms ==
Persons suffering from metallosis can experience any of the following symptoms:

- Extreme pain (even when not moving);
- Swelling and inflammation;
- Loosening of the implant;
- Joint dislocation;
- Bone deterioration;
- Aseptic fibrosis, local necrosis;
- Hip replacement failure;
- Metal toxicity from grinding metal components; and
- Necessary subsequent hip replacement revision or surgeries.

=== Complications ===
As the grinding components cause metal flakes to shed from the system, the implant wears down. Metallosis results in numerous additional side effects:

- Confusion;
- Feelings of malaise;
- Gastrointestinal problems;
- Dizziness;
- Headaches;
- Problems in the nervous system (feelings of burning, tingling, or numbness of the extremities); and
- Cobalt poisoning (skin rashes, cardiomyopathy, problems with hearing, sight or cognition, tremors, and hypothyroidism).

== DePuy hip replacement recall ==
In August 2010, DePuy recalled its hip replacement systems ASR XL Acetabular Hip Replacement System and ASR Hip Resurfacing System due to failure rates and side effects including metallosis. The recalls triggered a large number of lawsuits against DePuy and its parent company Johnson & Johnson upon claims that the companies knew about the dangers of the implants before they went on the market in the United States.
