= Hayley Chase =

American actress

- Born: United States
- Occupation: Actress
- Years active: 2003–present

Hayley Chase is an American actress, known for her many dramatic roles such as, Grey's Anatomy, Hawaii Five-0, NCIS, CSI: Miami, Criminal Minds and comedic guest starring roles on television as well as her recurring role as Joannie Palumbo on Hannah Montana. She has starred in numerous television ads for Yoplait and AT&T.

== Filmography ==
=== Film ===
Year	Title	Role	Notes
2008	Proud American	Megan	

=== Television ===
Year	Title	Role	Notes
2003	7th Heaven	Lauren	"Charity Begins at Home"
2006	Monk	Emily C.	"Mr. Monk and the Big Game"
2007–2011	Hannah Montana	Joannie Palumbo	Recurring role
2007	Medium	Nancy Claymore	"The Boy Next Door"
2008	The Mentalist	Darlene Pappas	"Red Tide"
2009	Make It or Break It	Gymnast #2	"Pilot"
2010	House	Julie	"A Pox on Our House"
2010	NCIS	Kimberly	"Guilty Pleasure"
2010	Lie to Me	Liz	"Beyond Belief"
2011	Hawaii Five-0	Jenn Hassley	"Ua Lawe Wale"
2011	Criminal Minds: Suspect Behavior	Jill	"Lonely Hearts"
2011	CSI: Miami	Ellie Wyatt	"Blown Away"
2011	Criminal Minds	Heather Wilson	"Hope"
2011	Inside	Lucca Scibird	"Inside"
2016	OREGONe		TV film; also director
2019	Grey's Anatomy	Cassidy Gardner	"Papa Don't Preach"
