= Chad Faust =

Canadian actor (born 1980)

- Born: July 14, 1980 (age 46); Victoria, British Columbia
- Years active: 2000–Current

Chad Faust (born July 14, 1980) is a Canadian actor, screenwriter, film director, and film producer, best known for his role as Kyle Baldwin in The 4400. He currently resides in Los Angeles, California. He is also known for his role in the 2007 film Descent, and the 2020 film Girl.

== Biography ==
Faust starred in Bang Bang You're Dead, a film about high school shootings. Faust was also seen in All I Want, which features him sporting a long mullet, cheap sunglasses, and a spiked collar alongside Elijah Wood, Franka Potente, and Mandy Moore. Among Faust's other credits are multiple independent films, the CTV television series So?, as well as guest spots on NBC's Skate and Heroes; DreamWorks' Taken; and WB's Black Sash and Smallville.

Faust was later seen as "Dean Withers," a Christian teenager who is sent to The Mercy House to "cure" his homosexuality, in the feature film Saved!, starring alongside a collection of young stars including Macaulay Culkin, Mandy Moore, Jena Malone, Patrick Fugit, and veterans Martin Donovan and Mary-Louise Parker. He also starred together with Rosario Dawson in Descent, in 2007.

Faust has written, directed and produced six short films and two features. We Ran Naked, a feature film about an author living in the shadow of his successful first novel, premiered in 1999, when Chad was just 19. Ballistic (2025) is his second feature film. As a solo recording artist, Faust has released two CDs under the independent label, Zotzman Music.

In early 2019, it was announced Faust had begun production on his directorial debut Girl, with actress Bella Thorne cast as the lead.

== Filmography ==
=== Film ===
Year	Title	Role	Notes
2002	Bang Bang You're Dead	Alex Lumberman	
2002	All I Want	Tough	AKA, Try Seventeen
2002	Moon in the Afternoon	TJ	Short film
2003	The Edge		Short film
2003	Hope Springs	Rob	
2004	Saved!	Dean	
2005	Tamara	Jesse	
2005	Nearing Grace	Lance	
2007	Descent	Jared	
2009	Plus One	Marco	Short film
2011	Red & Blue Marbles	Nick	
2012	Behind the Scenes of American Apparel	Dov Charney	Video short
2012	Plain Jane Escorts	Chuck	Short film
2013	Angst	Him	Short film
2013	Watercolor Postcards	Tommy	
2014	Oh God	The Priest	Short film
2014	Primeval	Tristan	Short film
2015	Silent War	Sergeant Gordon	Short film
2017	Warped	Madden	Short film
2018	Better Start Running	Dale Hankey	
2020	Girl	Charmer	Also Director and Writer
2025	Ballistic	SSG Buchanan	Also Director and Writer

=== Television ===
Year	Title	Role	Notes
2000	So...?	Wesley	TV series
2001	Sk8	Jesse	"All Skate"
2002	Taken	Top Gunner (uncredited)	"Beyond the Sky"
2003	Black Sash	Reginald Jones	"Like a Virgin"
2003	Smallville	Kyle	"Visitor"
2003–04	Still Life	Joe Hipps	Regular role
2004	The Ranch	Scotty	TV film
2004	Cold Squad	Greg	"Cock of the Walk"
2004–07	The 4400	Kyle Baldwin	Regular role
2006	CSI: Miami	Mike Doyle	"High Octane", "Backstabbers"
2008	CSI: NY	James Sutton	"The Cost of Living"
2008	Heroes	Scott	"Our Father", "Dual"
2009	Cold Case	Frank James	"WASP"
2009	Trauma	Raleigh	"That Fragile Hour", "Foul Lines"
2010	Lone Star	Harrison 'Harry' Boone	Recurring role
2010	Miami Medical	Todd	"Calle Cubana"
2011	House	Lane	"Out of the Chute"
2011	CSI: Crime Scene Investigation	Jimmy Finnerty	"73 Seconds"
2012	The Listener	'Manny' Mason	"Rogues' Gallery"
2015	Motive	Charlie Monahan	"The Amateurs"
