= Homecoming (1996 film) =

- Based on: Homecoming by Cynthia Voigt
- Written by: Christopher Carlson
- Directed by: Mark Jean
- Starring: Anne Bancroft; Kimberlee Peterson; Trever O'Brien; Hanna Hall; William Greenblatt
- Music by: W.G. Snuffy Walden
- Country of origin: United States
- Original language: English

Production
- Executive producer: Shirō Sasaki
- Producer: Jack Baran
- Cinematography: Toyomichi Kurita
- Editor: Nancy Richardson
- Running time: 105 minutes
- Production companies: Merko Production; Showtime Networks

Original release
- Network: Showtime
- Release: April 14, 1996

Homecoming is a 1996 American made-for-television drama film starring Anne Bancroft.

On April 14, 1996, Homecoming aired on the American cable channel, Showtime. The screenplay was written by Christopher Carlson and was based on Cynthia Voigt's novel, Homecoming. The movie follows the story of four children who were abandoned by their mother and left to fend for themselves. Homecoming was directed by Mark Jean, produced by Jack Baran, and the executive producer was Shirō Sasaki. This drama is rated PG and has a running time of 105 minutes.

Homecoming did not win any awards, despite being nominated for a total of five. Anne Bancroft was nominated for Outstanding Performance by a Female Actor in a TV Movie or Miniseries by the Screen Actors Guild. Christopher Carlson and Mark Jean were nominated for Adapted Long Form by the Writers Guild of America, USA. The movie gathered three Young Artist Awards nominations: Best Family TV Movie or Mini-Series - Cable, Best Performance in a TV Movie/Home Video - Young Ensemble, and Kimberlee Peterson was nominated for Best Performance in a TV Movie/Mini-Series - Young Actress.

== Plot ==
On a hot summer night in Pewauket, Connecticut, Liza Tillerman abandons her four children, 13-year-old Dicey, 10-year-old James, 9-year-old Maybeth, and 6-year-old Sammy, in a mall parking lot. With only a change of underwear, socks, a map, and $ 9, Dicey, James, Maybeth, and Sammy take off on foot to Bridgeport where their nearest known relative, Aunt Cilla, lives. Along the way, Dicey struggles to care for and protect her siblings.

After finally arriving at Aunt Cilla's, Eunice, their cousin, tells them that her mother (their Aunt Cilla) died the previous spring. Eunice consults Father Joseph—the priest from her local parish—who advises that the children may stay, but only temporarily. Eunice tells Dicey and her siblings of Abigail Tillerman, their grandmother, who lives in Crisfield, Maryland. They are informed that the police forwarded some money to the children in lieu of payment for the sale of their mother's car, but Eunice intercepts Dicey accepting it and holds it in her keeping. She also informs Dicey that she has decided to keep her and Maybeth, but that James and Sammy will have to live with some other families. Unable to bear the thought of separation, Dicey decides to take her brothers and sister to their grandmother's house, and slips out into the night with their money. They buy bus tickets to Crisfield, but upon arriving realize they do not know where she lives. Stopping at a nearby store to inquire, the proprietor informs them that Abigail doesn't have a phone and is isolated far out of town and has no way of being contacted. Dicey decides go alone on foot to Abigail's to meet her and assess the situation, leaving James in charge of Maybeth and Sammy.

After knocking on the door and getting no answer, Dicey goes around back to find Mrs. Tillerman sitting on the back porch. Dicey, hiding her identity, asks if she can do anything to help on the farm. Mrs. Tillerman silently marches back into the house before brusquely asking Dicey to join her.

Inside, she questions Dicey about her thoughts on death and other such morbid things in a somewhat belligerent manner. Nettled by her grandmother's tone and attitude, and on the point of getting up to leave, Dicey is revealed by Abigail that Eunice wrote to warn her the children would be coming, and that she is aware who Dicey is. However, she will not let the children stay. Stung, Dicey fires back, stating she doesn't want to stay. In the midst of the fierce conversation that ensues, Abigail begins to laugh and softens Dicey's mood a little. Abigail and Dicey take her boat to pick up the other children, and Dicey is alarmed when she doesn't see her siblings. Eventually, Dicey and Abigail find Sammy, who says James and Maybeth wanted to meet Abigail themselves and have already left. They return to Abigail's to find James and Maybeth just arriving.

Over the next few days, the children help their grandmother around the farm and with the cooking, and Abigail begins to warm toward them. However, Abigail tells Dicey she can't let the children stay with her; she is too old, has scarce savings and fears making the same mistakes she made with her own children. Some days later, Abigail receives a letter from Eunice discovering that the police have found Liza and that she had suffered a serious mental breakdown, with an accompanying photo for evidence. Liza has been admitted to a mental hospital and is suffering from catatonia, likely related to schizophrenia. The doctors at the mental hospital are dubious as to the possibility of her recovery. After several days—deciding that she cannot keep her grandchildren—Abigail insists that they must go back to Bridgeport and arranges for them to take the early morning bus. As they wait for the bus, Abigail, wavering on her decision, has a sudden change of heart and decides to keep the children after all. Happily, they return to the boat and make their way back home.

== Cast ==
- Kimberlee Peterson as Dicey Tillerman
- Trever O'Brien as James Tillerman
- Hanna R. Hall as Maybeth Tillerman
- William Greenblatt as Sammy Tillerman
- Anne Bancroft as Abigail Tillerman
- Anna Louise Richardson as Liza Tillerman (Momma)
- Scott Michael Campbell as Windy
- Bonnie Bedelia as Eunice Logan
