= Homecoming (novel) =

1981 novel by Cynthia Voigt

- Author: Cynthia Voigt
- Illustrator: Sharon Scotland
- Cover artist: Mark Harrison
- Language: English
- Series: Tillerman Cycle
- Genre: Young adult novel
- Publisher: Atheneum Books
- Publication date: 1981
- Publication place: United States
- Media type: Print
- Pages: 312 pp
- ISBN: 0689308337
- OCLC: 1015947458
- Followed by: Dicey's Song

Homecoming is a 1981 young adult novel by American children's author Cynthia Voigt. It is the first of seven novels in the Tillerman Cycle. It was adapted into a television film.

== Plot ==
Homecoming, set around the late 1970s, tells the story of four siblings aged between 6 and 13, whose mother abandons them one summer afternoon in their car next to a Connecticut shopping mall during an aborted road trip to a family member in Bridgeport. Realizing that their mother is not coming back, and that they cannot go home (as their father walked out before the youngest child was born), the children travel together, mostly on foot, trying to reach Bridgeport. There, they hope to find their missing mother at the home of a relative they have never met. The children find themselves on a journey that is emotional as well as literal; during their weeks on the road, their adventures and the people they meet along the way help them to find out more about who they are and what is important to them, as well as to cope with the loss of their mother and to understand society's reaction to her poverty, isolation, mental illness, and the fact that she was an unmarried mother of four.

13-year-old Dicey Tillerman, and her siblings James (10), Maybeth (9) and Sammy (6), lived in a wooden house out in the dunes in Provincetown, Massachusetts. The family is poor, their father walked out just before Sammy was born, and only Dicey retains any memory of him. Their mother worked herself too hard (physically and emotionally) to take care of her four children and make ends meet.

The novel begins when the Tillerman children find themselves alone in their car, some miles from their home, in a shopping mall parking lot in Peewauket, apparently Connecticut. Momma had driven them away from home, saying that they were going to visit her Aunt Cilla in Bridgeport, Connecticut. At the mall, she parked the car and walked away, instructing the children to do what Dicey told them.

After waiting for a few hours, Dicey begins to understand that Momma is not coming back. Worried that going to the authorities might place her siblings and herself in foster homes and split them up, Dicey decides that the four children must try to continue on to Aunt Cilla themselves, and that hopefully they will find their mother there.

The children set off on foot, as they do not have enough money for a bus. Dicey realizes that the journey is longer than she had initially thought it would be. She then takes charge of their meager finances, by earning money whenever necessary and possible. Dicey comes to understand more fully how difficult things must have been for Momma, and how she must have slowly lost hope (and eventually her sanity).

The children's journey is a long one. They are often hungry and sad and have some frightening brushes with danger. When their money runs out in the center of New Haven, Dicey makes James, Maybeth, and Sammy sleep under a bush in a park, while she watches over them. They are rescued by a college student, Windy, who feeds them and offers them shelter. The next day, Stewart, Windy's roommate, gives the children a ride to Bridgeport, dropping them off outside Aunt Cilla's house.

At Aunt Cilla's, Dicey and her family learn some uncomfortable truths: their mother is not there and Aunt Cilla is recently deceased. Her middle-aged, unmarried daughter Eunice, a devout Catholic, is reluctant to be burdened with the Tillerman children. She had plans to enter a convent and taking in the homeless children will put an end to her dreams of becoming a nun. The children are not Catholic, and their parents were unmarried, which Eunice does not like. Reluctantly, with the advice of a Catholic priest, she takes them in. The police try to trace the children's mother.

The younger children are put into a Catholic summer camp, while Dicey is made to stay home and help Eunice keep house. Sammy gets into fights and is unruly and difficult when at home. Maybeth is extremely shy and has learning difficulties. Cousin Eunice believes she is "retarded", and that Sammy is unmanageable. James becomes distant from his family.

The children are informed that their mother is completely catatonic in a Massachusetts state psychiatric hospital, without much chance of recovery. As a result, any dream they harbored of being reunited with their momma and starting a new life with her is shattered.

Dicey plans to leave Eunice's house alone, in search of a better home for her family with her maternal grandmother, who lives in Crisfield, Maryland. Although she had only planned to visit her, the other Tillerman children sneak away from school to join her. The Tillerman family finds itself on the road again in search of a home; this ends the first part of the novel.

The second journey, like the first, is hard and fraught with danger. Attempting to earn money by picking tomatoes, the children find themselves nearly captured by their employer who has apparently taken an interest in Maybeth. In an attempt to escape, the children are helped by a traveling circus who drive the children to Crisfield.

Abigail Tillerman, the children's maternal grandmother, lives alone on a run-down farm. She tells Dicey that the children cannot live there and that she can shelter them for only one night. However, Dicey realizes that the farm would be good for her family, and that they have nowhere else to go. She and her family try to win their grandmother over by doing work around the farm. Dicey learns that her grandmother is frightened of becoming emotionally attached to the Tillerman children, in case she were to lose them as she lost her own children. Mrs. Tillerman confesses to Dicey that she bears the pain of this, and fears repeating the same failures.

Eventually, Mrs. Tillerman comes to the realization that besides caring deeply for the four children, she can and will offer them a permanent home, despite the emotional and financial fears she has. The novel ends with Dicey feeling that she and her family have come home at last.

== Reception ==
The book was added to the New York Times suggested summer reading list in 1981.

== Sequels ==
This novel is the first in a seven-part series, known as the Tillerman Cycle. The novel introduces some of the main characters in the cycle, and refers to others, such as Bullet Tillerman and Francis Verricker. Apart from Dicey's Song, which describes events immediately following Homecoming, the Tillerman Cycle is not chronological. Each book in the series follows events in the lives of different characters introduced in Dicey's Song or Homecoming. Seventeen Against the Dealer takes up events in Dicey's life when she is 21. A Solitary Blue concerns events in the life of Jeff Greene, a character introduced in Dicey's Song and a central figure in Seventeen Against the Dealer. The Runner is about Samuel 'Bullet' Tillerman, the children's late maternal uncle and Gram's son. Sons from Afar tells the story of James' and Sammy's search for the lost father, Francis Verricker. Come a Stranger describes events in the life of Mina, a character introduced in Dicey's Song.

Homecoming can be seen as the first in a two-part series, which forms the basis for the explorations of character that occur throughout the rest of the Tillerman Cycle.
