= Kimberlee Peterson =

American actress

- Born: Kimberlee Michelle Peterson; May 8, 1980 (age 45); Boise, Idaho, U.S.
- Occupation: Actress
- Years active: 1995–present

Kimberlee Michelle Peterson (born May 8, 1980) is an American television and film actress.

== Background ==
Peterson was born in Boise, Idaho, but raised in Colorado. At the age of four, Peterson began her career as a child actress in episodes of Perry Mason. At the age of 15, she co-starred in Homecoming opposite Anne Bancroft.

Throughout the 1990s and 2000s, Peterson appeared in numerous television episodes. Peterson is the owner of Lotta Photography, a headshot photography business based in the San Fernando Valley.

== Filmography ==
=== Film ===
Year	Title	Role	Notes
2000	Farewell, My Love	Young Brigit	
2005	Stray	Alicia	Short film
2009	Serious Moonlight	Trashy Girl	
2015	Repression	Sophia	Short film
2018	Corbin Nash	Tortured Soul	

=== Television ===
Year	Title	Role	Notes
1995	Fudge	Teenage Girl	"Play It Again, Dad"
1996	Homecoming	"Dicey" Tillerman	TV film
1997	Touched by an Angel	Karen Gregg	"Crisis of Faith"
1997	Legend of the Lost Tomb	Karen Lacy	TV film
1998	Profiler	Cindy Hemmet	"Cycle of Violence"
1999	The Last Man on Planet Earth	Karen	TV film
1999	Primal Force	Kelsey Cunningham	TV film
1999	Undressed	Debbie	Recurring role
1999	Get Real	Holly	"Anatomy of a Rumor"
1999	Chicken Soup for the Soul	Unknown	"Egg Lessons"
2000	Secret Cutting	Dawn Cottrell	film
2000	Strong Medicine	Penny Pointer	"BRCA2"
2000	Baywatch	Liv Larson	"Ties That Bind"
2001	The Young and the Restless	Sara	3 episodes
2001	NYPD Blue	Sally Jones	"Two Clarks in a Bar"
2001	The Practice	Andrea Vaughan	"Suffer the Little Children"
2002	Presidio Med	Unknown	"When Approaching a Let-Go"
2002	That Was Then	Alex Pendleton	"1.6", "1.7"
2002–2003	Boston Public	Natalie Stone	"Chapter 37", "Chapter 42", "Chapter 75"
2003	The Division	Brandy Hollenbeck	"Cradle Will Rock"
2003	Dragnet	Mallory Tasker	"Sticks and Stones"
2003	The West Wing	Lauren Shelby	"The California 47th", "Red Haven's on Fire", "Life on Mars"
2003	CSI: Crime Scene Investigation	Ashley Curtwell	"Coming of Rage"
2005	Judging Amy	Fanny	"You Don't Know Me"
2006	Charmed	Jen	"Generation Hex"
2006	NCIS	Navy Lieutenant Keira Napleto	"Untouchable"
2008	Criminal Minds	Melissa Foster	"52 Pickup"
2011	House	Nina	"The Dig"
2011	L.A. Noire	Jean Archer (voice)	Video game
