= Dicey's Song =

1982 novel by Cynthia Voigt

- First edition cover
- Author: Cynthia Voigt
- Language: English
- Series: The Tillerman Series
- Genre: Novel
- Publisher: Atheneum Books/Simon & Schuster Books for Young Readers
- Publication date: October 1982
- Publication place: United States
- Media type: Print (Hardback & Paperback)
- Pages: 196 pp (first edition, hardback)
- ISBN: 0-689-30944-9 (first edition, hardback)
- OCLC: 8220792
- LC Class: PZ7.V874 Di 1982
- Preceded by: Homecoming
- Followed by: A Solitary Blue

Dicey's Song is a novel by Cynthia Voigt. It won the Newbery Medal for excellence in American children's literature in 1983.

== Plot ==
Picking up where Homecoming left off, Dicey Tillerman and her three siblings, Sammy, Maybeth, and James, are now living with their widowed grandmother Abigail Tillerman, or Gram as the children call her, on her farm just outside Crisfield, Maryland. Because the Tillermans' mom just left them in the parking lot in Provincetown, the children have the chance to start living a completely new life in their new family home, even though several of the major issues of Homecoming are not resolved. Dicey has trouble letting go of her siblings enough to let Gram take over as a parental figure. She also worries about her mother Liza, who is catatonic and seriously ill in a psychiatric hospital in Boston.

While in their new school, the Tillermans make several new friends: Mr. Lingerle, the elementary school's music teacher, who begins giving Maybeth piano lessons; Mina, a friendly African-American girl who goes to school with Dicey; and Jeff, a high school student who likes to play the guitar. To help Gram support the family, Dicey starts to work for Millie Tydings, the owner of the local grocery store, whom Gram has known since childhood.

Gram soon comes to terms with having to accept Social Security payments to help with the costs of raising her four grandchildren. She also must confront and reexamine her past, particularly her relationship with her deceased husband and her three children. Gram refuses to discuss her past with the children, and their attempts to find out about it by climbing into the attic are met with anger.

As the children settle into the routines of their new school and after-school jobs, Gram receives a number of letters from the psychiatric hospital in which the children's catatonic mother resides. The letters do not appear to bring hopeful news, although Gram does not discuss their contents with the children. Dicey is frustrated that Gram will not open up and talk about her past, or their mother's past as a child growing up with her two siblings in the same house that Dicey and her brothers and sister are now living. She is also frustrated that her grandmother will not tell her what is in the letters from Boston, beyond the fact that her mother is no better.

In December, the psychiatric hospital in Boston calls and informs Gram that Liza is in a critical state and may not live much longer. Dicey and Gram travel to Boston, and find Liza catatonic, not responding to any treatment. Liza soon dies and, since they can't afford the cost of a funeral or of transporting Liza's body from Boston to Crisfield, Gram and Dicey decide to cremate her. Dicey is given a hand-carved wooden box by the owner of a local gift store who is touched by her situation. When Dicey and Gram arrive back in Crisfield, the family buries the wooden box containing their mother's ashes under the paper mulberry tree in their front yard, which to the Tillermans is important to the family because of its fragility and beauty.

== Reception ==
At the time of the book's publication, Kirkus Reviews said, "Through all the hardships, comforts, and passages, Dicey remains the sturdy presence we met in Homecoming; new [sic] she and Gram make a strong, crusty pair, and the other children come along according to their observantly individualized courses. A resilient family and a gratifying journey's end." In a retrospective essay about the Newbery Medal-winning books from 1976 to 1985, literary critic Zena Sutherland wrote, "The characterization is consistent and perceptive, the setting solidly established, and the plot elements are firmly knit by a writing style smooth enough to compensate for the occasional lag in pace that comes with iteration."

Awards
Preceded by A Visit to William Blake's Inn	Newbery Medal recipient 1983	Succeeded by Dear Mr. Henshaw
