= House season 2 =

House
- Season 2
- Season 2 DVD cover
- Starring: Hugh Laurie; Lisa Edelstein; Omar Epps; Robert Sean Leonard; Jennifer Morrison; Jesse Spencer
- No. of episodes: 24

Release
- Original network: Fox
- Original release: September 13, 2005 – May 23, 2006

Season chronology
- ← Previous; Season 1 Next → Season 3

The second season of House premiered on September 13, 2005 and ended on May 23, 2006. During the season, House tries to cope with his feelings for his ex-girlfriend Stacy Warner, who, after he diagnosed her husband with acute intermittent porphyria, has taken a job in the legal department of Princeton-Plainsboro Teaching Hospital.

Sela Ward's chemistry with Hugh Laurie in the final two episodes of the first season was strong enough to have her character return in seven episodes of the second season.

== Cast and characters ==
=== Main cast ===
- Hugh Laurie as Dr. Gregory House
- Lisa Edelstein as Dr. Lisa Cuddy
- Omar Epps as Dr. Eric Foreman
- Robert Sean Leonard as Dr. James Wilson
- Jennifer Morrison as Dr. Allison Cameron
- Jesse Spencer as Dr. Robert Chase

=== Recurring cast ===
- Sela Ward as Stacy Warner
- Stephanie Venditto as Nurse Brenda Previn
- Currie Graham as Mark Warner
- Diane Baker as Blythe House
- R. Lee Ermey as John House
- Charles S. Dutton as Rodney Foreman
- Ron Perkins as Dr. Ron Simpson

=== Guest cast ===
Laura Allen, Yareli Arizmendi, Matthew John Armstrong, Mackenzie Astin, Christine Avila, Marshall Bell, Peter Birkenhead, Tamara Braun, Yvette Nicole Brown, Dan Butler, Scott Michael Campbell, Christopher Carley, Jewel Christian, Michelle Clunie, Aasha Davis, Thomas Dekker, Stephanie Erb, Elle Fanning, Bruce French, Erica Gimpel, Greg Grunberg, Wings Hauser, Taraji P. Henson, Howard Hesseman, Wil Horneff, Ryan Hurst, James Immekus, LL Cool J, William Katt, Mimi Kennedy, Edward Kerr, Elias Koteas, Nathan Kress, Tom Lenk, Ron Livingston, Samantha Mathis, Jayma Mays, Eddie Mills, Cynthia Nixon, Michael O'Keefe, America Olivo, Kip Pardue, Randall Park, Sasha Pieterse, Kristoffer Polaha, Clifton Powell, Keri Lynn Pratt, Cameron Richardson, Charlie Robinson, Ignacio Serricchio, Vicellous Reon Shannon, Allison Smith, Christie Lynn Smith, D. B. Sweeney, Chris Tallman, Michelle Trachtenberg, Hillary Tuck, Alanna Ubach, Stephanie Venditto, Tom Verica, J. R. Villarreal and Julie Warner.

== Reception ==
The season gained high Nielsen ratings; "No Reason" was watched by 25.47 million viewers, the show's biggest audience ever at that point. Season two averaged 17.3 million viewers an episode, outperforming season one by 30%. The number of viewers made it the tenth most-watched show of the 2005–2006 television season.

Writer Lawrence Kaplow won a Writers Guild of America Award in 2006 for the episode "Autopsy".

== Episodes ==
No. overall	No. in season	Title	Directed by	Written by	Original release date	US viewers (millions)
23	1	"Acceptance"	Dan Attias	Russel Friend & Garrett Lerner	September 13, 2005	15.91
House is brought in for a consult on a Death Row inmate (LL Cool J) with mysterious symptoms. Cameron feels the hospital's resources are better used to find a different diagnosis for a young cancer patient (Christie Lynn Smith). House and Stacy try to establish a good work relationship, especially after he lies to her to secure the transfer of the inmate to the hospital. Wilson coaches Cameron as she struggles to inform the patient of the cancer diagnosis. Final diagnosis: Methanol poisoning and pheochromocytoma (Clarence) and Lung cancer (Cindy)
24	2	"Autopsy"	Deran Sarafian	Lawrence Kaplow	September 20, 2005	13.64
A nine-year-old cancer patient (Sasha Pieterse) is brought before House after she experiences hallucinations. House figures out a way to help her, but it will involve serious risk. They discover she has a tumor on her heart, but when it turns out to be benign, the team decides a clot may be navigating her body. House argues with his team and Wilson about the nature of the child's bravery and whether it is a symptom of her illness. Final diagnosis: Thrombosis
25	3	"Humpty Dumpty"	Dan Attias	Matt Witten	September 27, 2005	13.37
Cuddy feels responsible when her handyman (Ignacio Serricchio) falls off her roof then exhibits unusual symptoms. House's team amputates the handyman's hand to prevent the spread of infection, but when the other hand starts showing similar signs, they must seek out the source before it kills the patient. House ultimately realizes that it's psittacosis, a rare disease associated with exposure to birds, to which the team objects because he doesn't work with birds at any of his jobs. Ultimately, the team finds an illegal cockfight where he works on Saturday nights. Final diagnosis: Endocarditis secondary to psittacosis
26	4	"TB or Not TB"	Peter O'Fallon	David Foster	November 1, 2005	13.44
A famous doctor, Sebastian Charles (Ron Livingston), falls ill when working in Africa, and is sent to House for treatment. Tensions mount when House refuses to believe he has tuberculosis, but everyone else believes so. Cameron takes a liking to Charles, who asks her out. After Cameron administers a tuberculosis test against House's wishes, Charles refuses additional tests or treatment. House insists tuberculosis cannot explain all of the symptoms and must persuade Charles to be treated. Final diagnosis: Nesidioblastoma and tuberculosis
27	5	"Daddy's Boy"	Greg Yaitanes	Thomas L. Moran	November 8, 2005	14.16
A student (Vicellous Reon Shannon) who just graduated from Princeton experiences severe spasms at a graduation party. Meanwhile, House's parents drop by but he is reluctant to see them, igniting curiosity among the hospital staff. Final diagnosis: Cavernous angioma and radiation poisoning
28	6	"Spin"	Fred Gerber	Sara Hess	November 15, 2005	12.95
A famous cyclist (Kristoffer Polaha) is brought to Princeton-Plainsboro after collapsing during a race. He is surprisingly honest about several illegal medications and techniques he applies to himself, but his sickness is not caused by any of these. House attends and is kicked out of a group therapy session after aggravating Mark. Stacy tells House that she has been seeing a therapist herself in light of supporting Mark during his disability. House breaks into her therapist's office to photocopy notes from Stacy's sessions. Final diagnosis: Air embolism and pure red cell aplasia secondary to a thymoma from myasthenia gravis
29	7	"Hunting"	Gloria Muzio	Liz Friedman	November 22, 2005	14.72
House is confronted by Kalvin (Matthew John Armstrong), a gay man who demands treatment when other doctors diagnose him with AIDS, something he admits he does have. House begins making moves on Stacy using notes he stole from her therapist on her relationship with Mark. Stacy is angered after House reveals that he accessed the notes. Cameron is potentially exposed to HIV by contact with Kalvin's blood and must have preventative treatment. She confiscates drugs from Kalvin's bag to help diagnose him. Distressed by her potential exposure, Cameron takes some of the drugs after work. When Chase arrives at her home to console her, they end up sleeping together. Final diagnosis: Echinococcosis
30	8	"The Mistake"	David Semel	Peter Blake	November 29, 2005	14.91
A lawsuit is brought against Chase and House for the death of a mother (Allison Smith) who comes in with stomach pain, by her brother (Ryan Hurst). A disciplinary committee convenes to determine whether either of them is at fault. Stacy must question both of them to prepare for the hearing. Chase's original error is due to distraction by receiving news that his father has died, just as the mother walked in for her initial examination; the committee rules that Chase be suspended for one week. It also determines that House's work be supervised by Foreman for one month as temporary head of the department. Final diagnosis: Behçet's disease, then hepatitis C and hepatocellular carcinoma from a liver transplant
31	9	"Deception"	Deran Sarafian	Michael R. Perry	December 13, 2005	14.65
Anica (Cynthia Nixon) is at an OTB parlor where House observes her have a seizure. She is admitted to the hospital but Cameron wants her to be discharged when they discover she has Munchausen syndrome, however, House believes she has an underlying condition. House clashes with Foreman over the diagnosis. Cuddy toys with making Foreman the permanent department head. Final diagnosis: Clostridium perfringens and Munchausen syndrome
32	10	"Failure to Communicate"	Jace Alexander	Doris Egan	January 10, 2006	14.83
While House and Stacy are in Baltimore, a famed journalist (Michael O'Keefe) collapses in his magazine company's office. While he acts nonchalantly after getting up, it becomes clear from his word-salad-inflected speech that he is suffering from aphasia. Cuddy and Foreman rely on House's insight over the phone. House and Stacy's flight is delayed so they spend more time together. They exchange a kiss but House gets distracted with deciphering the journalist's speech remotely. Final diagnosis: Bipolar disorder and Cerebral malaria
33	11	"Need to Know"	David Semel	Pamela Davis	February 7, 2006	22.24
Cameron worries about the potential results of her HIV test and House basks in the afterglow of his kiss with Stacy, but Wilson tells him to keep a level head about things. House must dig through the life and lies of a busy housewife (Julie Warner) to find the true reason why she is showing signs of physical and mental degeneration. Stacy and House have sex, after which House gives Stacy an ultimatum: him or Mark. Foreman's responsibility as temporary department head ends and House regains control. Mark finds House and confesses concerns that he is losing Stacy. Cameron's follow-up HIV test returns negative. Stacy chooses House, but House rejects her based on their past history and dysfunction. Stacy then leaves Princeton-Plainsboro and departs with Mark. Final diagnosis: Ritalin abuse, then hepatocellular adenoma caused by contraception
34	12	"Distractions"	Dan Attias	Lawrence Kaplow	February 14, 2006	19.20
The team struggles to diagnose a teen (James Immekus) suffering from spasms when severe burns following an accident make most of their usual diagnostic tests impossible. Meanwhile, House exacts revenge on a doctor who turned him in for cheating in medical school. House tests the doctor's migraine medicine on himself by self-inducing a migraine. Wilson accuses him of doing so only to take his mind off of Stacy. After solving the medical case, House hires a prostitute. Final diagnosis: Serotonin syndrome
35	13	"Skin Deep"	Jim Hayman	Story by : Russel Friend & Garrett Lerner; Teleplay by : Russel Friend & Garrett Lerner & David Shore	February 20, 2006	14.18
House treats a teenage supermodel (Cameron Richardson) who suddenly passes out during a fashion show. When her toxicology screen shows heroin, she is treated for addiction; unfortunately, her symptoms continue after she is weaned off the drugs. Meanwhile, House fights off increasingly bad leg pain which Cuddy and Wilson suppose to be brought on by Stacy's absence. Final diagnosis: Pseudohermaphroditism (More specifically Complete androgen insensitivity syndrome) and testicular cancer
36	14	"Sex Kills"	David Semel	Matt Witten	March 7, 2006	20.56
House treats a man (Howard Hesseman) who unknowingly has a seizure and is in need of a new heart. He was admitted by his daughter Amy Errington (Keri Lynn Pratt). When the transplant committee votes "no," House tries to get one from a dead woman whose organs have also been rejected by the committee. Wilson begins living with House after revealing that his third wife has been cheating on him. Final diagnosis: Brucellosis (Henry) and Fitz-Hugh–Curtis syndrome secondary to gonorrhea (Laura)
37	15	"Clueless"	Deran Sarafian	Thomas L. Moran	March 28, 2006	21.44
When a man (Eddie Mills) cannot breathe during sexual role playing with his wife, House questions the motives behind their marriage; Wilson's presence in his house begins to take a toll on him. At the clinic, House treats a husband and wife for herpes as they argue over who first contracted it. House erases a message left on his answering machine from Wilson's apartment hunt. Final diagnosis: Gold sodium thiomalate poisoning
38	16	"Safe"	Félix Alcalá	Peter Blake	April 4, 2006	22.71
Melinda (Michelle Trachtenberg), a troubled teenager who is immuno-compromised as a result of medications she must take after a heart transplant, has a severe allergic reaction and goes into shock when her boyfriend visits her. Meanwhile, House and Wilson continue to work out the problems in their new living arrangement, initiating a prank war between the two. Final diagnosis: Tick paralysis
39	17	"All In"	Fred Gerber	David Foster	April 11, 2006	21.20
The hospital is hosting an oncology benefit poker tournament when a six-year-old boy (Carter Page) is brought in exhibiting symptoms identical to those of a patient House had twelve years ago. House is convinced the boy's case is identical and he can predict the course of the young patient's illness, which ended in the first patient's death. Final diagnosis: Erdheim–Chester disease
40	18	"Sleeping Dogs Lie"	Greg Yaitanes	Sara Hess	April 18, 2006	22.64
A young woman's (Jayma Mays) health becomes a question of ethics when she is unable to sleep for ten days. It is not until House discovers she will need a liver transplant that he also uncovers some vital information about her and her partner Max. Meanwhile, Cameron accuses Foreman of plagiarism when an article he authors appears remarkably similar to one of hers. Final diagnosis: Bubonic plague
41	19	"House vs. God"	John F. Showalter	Doris Egan	April 25, 2006	24.52
House wants to call a 15-year-old faith healer's (Thomas Dekker) bluff, but when the boy is admitted into the hospital he seemingly causes a cancer patient's condition to go into remission. After being diagnosed, the boy refuses brain surgery, but when his condition worsens, House and his staff have to make a decision. Wilson begins sleeping with and living with one of his terminal cancer patients, Grace, who was encouraged by the faith healer. Final diagnosis: Tuberous sclerosis and herpes encephalitis
42	20	"Euphoria (Part 1)"	Deran Sarafian	Matthew V. Lewis	May 2, 2006	22.71
House is trying to cure a crooked cop (Scott Michael Campbell) who acts turbulent and laughs uncontrollably, but he and his team are unable to determine the cause. When Foreman starts showing similar symptoms to that of the ill cop, the situation soon becomes deadly serious for everyone involved. Final diagnosis: Secondary legionellosis but no final diagnosis
43	21	"Euphoria (Part 2)"	Deran Sarafian	Russel Friend & Garrett Lerner & David Shore	May 3, 2006	17.16
After the police officer dies, Foreman, fearing for his life, contacts his father who rushes to his son's side. Meanwhile, House and the rest of the team are still trying to save Foreman before the disease that killed the officer gets him too. House's team is not allowed to autopsy the officer's body by Cuddy, who is awaiting the evaluation from the CDC in three days. Foreman dreads treatment as his pain increases and a diagnosis eludes the team. Final diagnosis: Induced legionellosis and primary amoebic meningoencephalitis secondary to infection by Naegleria fowleri
44	22	"Forever"	Daniel Sackheim	Liz Friedman	May 9, 2006	24.29
On his way out the door, a man vomits and decides to stay home from work, only to find his wife (Hillary Tuck) in the bathtub having a seizure and their newborn infant drowning. Chase transfers to the NICU to decompress from working in House's department. Wilson and Cuddy go on a date. Foreman's recovery changes how he relates to the rest of the team. Final diagnosis: Pellagra, celiac disease, MALT lymphoma and Postpartum preeclampsia
45	23	"Who's Your Daddy?"	Martha Mitchell	Story by : Charles M. Duncan & John Mankiewicz; Teleplay by : John Mankiewicz & Lawrence Kaplow	May 16, 2006	22.38
A 16-year-old Hurricane Katrina victim (Aasha Davis) suffering from horrifying hallucinations is brought to House by a former bandmate (D. B. Sweeney) who recently discovered the girl is his daughter. Although House fears his friend is being scammed, he takes the case. As he works his way through the girl's lies in order to diagnose and treat her, he is forced to tell a few lies of his own. Final diagnosis: Haemochromatosis and zygomycosis
46	24	"No Reason"	David Shore	Story by : Lawrence Kaplow & David Shore; Teleplay by : David Shore	May 23, 2006	25.47
When House and his team are working on the diagnosis of a man with a swollen tongue, the husband of a former patient walks into House's office and shoots him in the stomach. House continues to treat his patient from his ICU bed although the shooter (Elias Koteas), who was shot by hospital security and handcuffed to his bed, has become his roommate. When the after effects of the shooting begin to impact House, he starts to question his own ability to diagnose properly. As his patient's body deteriorates, House struggles through self-doubt and must trust his team to find a way to solve the case as well as trying to divide reality from fiction. Final diagnosis: None (hallucination by House)

== DVD releases ==
Set details				Special features
Country	North America	United Kingdom	Australia	Bonus Featurettes: "An Evening with House"; Blooper Reel; Alternate Takes; "It Could Be Lupus"; Producer Commentary
# episodes	24			Bonus Featurettes: "An Evening with House"; Blooper Reel; Alternate Takes; "It Could Be Lupus"; Producer Commentary
Aspect ratio	1.78:1			Bonus Featurettes: "An Evening with House"; Blooper Reel; Alternate Takes; "It Could Be Lupus"; Producer Commentary
Running time	1044 minutes	1008 minutes	1037 minutes	Bonus Featurettes: "An Evening with House"; Blooper Reel; Alternate Takes; "It Could Be Lupus"; Producer Commentary
Audio	Dolby Digital 5.1			Bonus Featurettes: "An Evening with House"; Blooper Reel; Alternate Takes; "It Could Be Lupus"; Producer Commentary
Subtitles	English, Spanish	—N/a	none	Bonus Featurettes: "An Evening with House"; Blooper Reel; Alternate Takes; "It Could Be Lupus"; Producer Commentary
# of discs	6			Bonus Featurettes: "An Evening with House"; Blooper Reel; Alternate Takes; "It Could Be Lupus"; Producer Commentary
Region	1 (NTSC)	2 (PAL)	4 (PAL)	Bonus Featurettes: "An Evening with House"; Blooper Reel; Alternate Takes; "It Could Be Lupus"; Producer Commentary
Rating	NOT RATED	15	M	Bonus Featurettes: "An Evening with House"; Blooper Reel; Alternate Takes; "It Could Be Lupus"; Producer Commentary
Release date	August 22, 2006	October 23, 2006	October 25, 2006	Bonus Featurettes: "An Evening with House"; Blooper Reel; Alternate Takes; "It Could Be Lupus"; Producer Commentary
