= Central nervous system cavernous hemangioma =

Cerebral cavernous malformation (CCM)
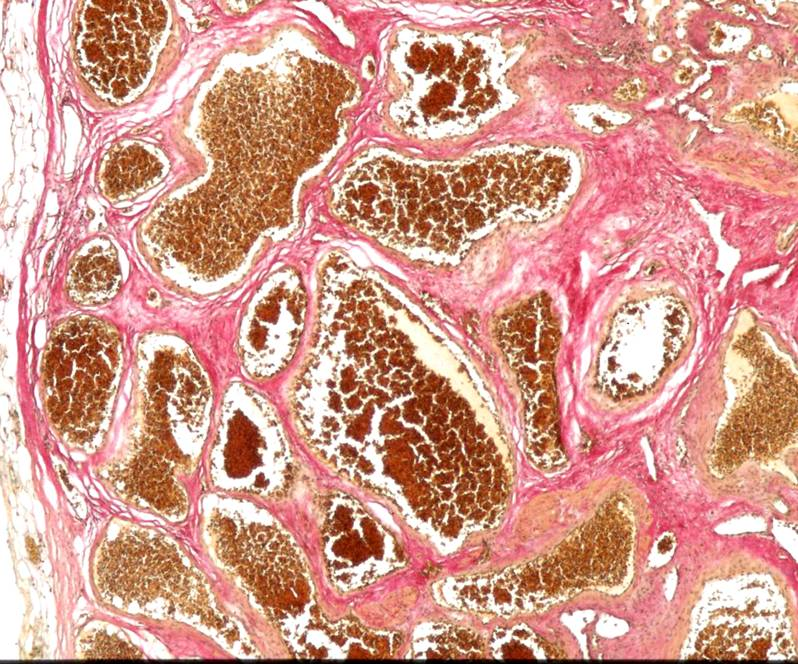
- Histology of a cavernous hemangioma
- Specialty: Oncology

Cerebral cavernous malformation (CCM) is a cavernous hemangioma that arises in the central nervous system. It can be considered to be a variant of hemangioma, and is characterized by grossly large dilated blood vessels and large vascular channels, less well circumscribed, and more involved with deep structures, with a single layer of endothelium and an absence of neuronal tissue within the lesions. These thinly walled vessels resemble sinusoidal cavities filled with stagnant blood. Blood vessels in patients with cerebral cavernous malformations (CCM) can range from a few millimeters to several centimeters in diameter. Most lesions occur in the brain, but any organ may be involved.

== Symptoms and signs ==
Clinical symptoms of central nervous system origin include recurrent headaches, focal neurological deficits, hemorrhagic stroke, and seizures, but CCM can also be asymptomatic. The nature and severity of the symptoms depend on the lesion's location.

=== CCMs and venous angiomas ===
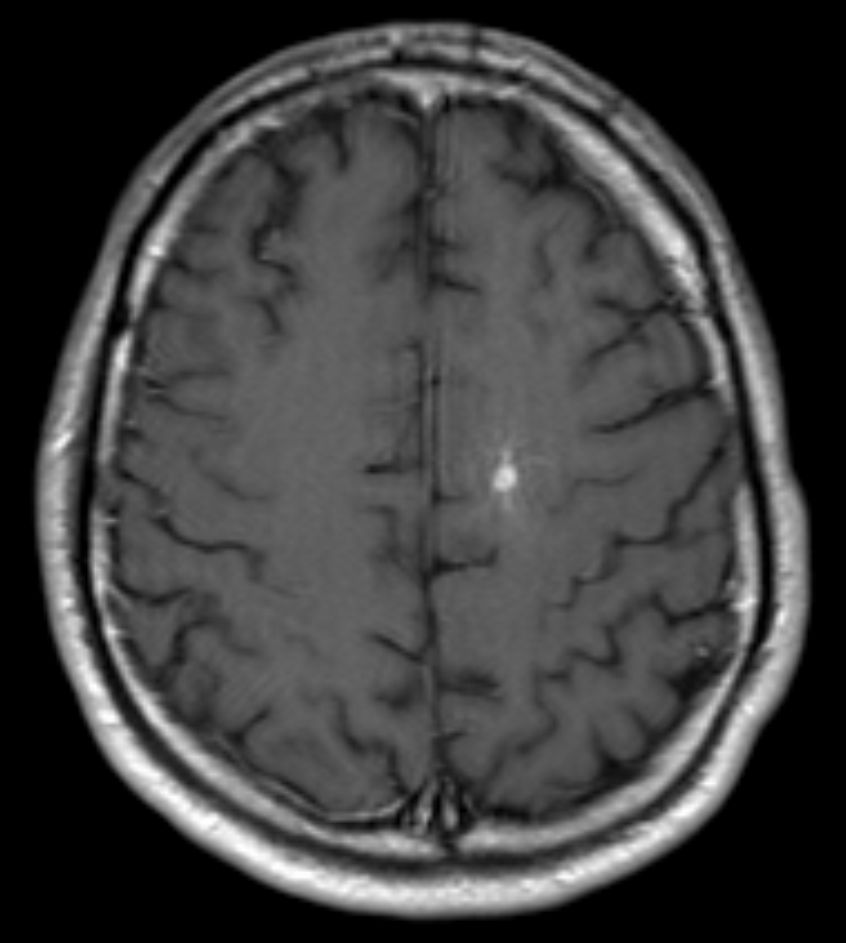
Developmental venous abnormality seen on a (T1 axial contrast enhanced) MRI.

In up to 30% there is a coincidence of CCM with a venous angioma, also known as a developmental venous anomaly. These lesions appear either as enhancing linear blood vessels or caput medusae, a radial orientation of small vessels that resemble the hair of Medusa from Greek mythology. These lesions are thought to represent developmental anomalies of normal venous drainage. These lesions should not be removed, as venous infarcts have been reported. When found in association with a CCM that needs resection, great care should be taken not to disrupt the angioma.

== Genetics ==
Familial forms of CCM occur at three known genetic loci. The gene for CCM1 encodes KRIT1 (krev interaction trapped 1), and has been found to bind to ICAP1alpha (integrin cytoplasmic domain associated protein alpha), a beta1 integrin associated protein. A particular mutation in CCM1 (the Q455X mutation), accounts for a cluster of cases in the Southwestern United States. This cluster, particularly in northern New Mexico, is an example of the founder effect; it has been traced back to early Spanish settlers.

The gene for CCM2 encodes a protein named malcavernin that contains a phosphotyrosine binding domain. The exact biological function of CCM2 is not clear. Recently, it has been shown that CCM1 and CCM2 proteins as well as ICAP1alpha form a macromolecular complex in the cell. In addition, it appears that CCM2 protein may function as a scaffolding protein for MAP kinases that are essential in p38 activation responding to osmotic stress including MEKK3 and MKK3. It also binds to Rac and actin. Therefore, CCM2 protein is also called OSM (osmosensing scaffold for MEKK3).

The CCM3 gene is the most recently identified CCM gene . CCM3 is known as PDCD10 (programmed cell death 10), which was initially identified as a gene that is up-regulated during the induction of apoptosis (cell death) in TF-1, a human myeloid cell line. The precise role of the PDCD10 protein in the CCM pathway is not clear. It is recently shown that PDCD10 forms a complex with CCM1 protein (KRIT1) and CCM2 protein (OSM). PDCD10 interacts directly with OSM independent of KRIT1-OSM interaction. Research is ongoing to determine the function and properties of all three CCM gene products as well as the reaction pathways in which they are involved.

Evidence suggests that a fourth gene, CCM4, may also cause CCM. Mutations in these genes account for 70 to 80 percent of all cases of cerebral cavernous malformations. The remaining 20 to 30 percent of cases may be due to other, still unidentified, genes. Recently it has been shown that the deletion of CDC42 in endothelial cells elicits cerebral vascular malformations, suggesting that it may be a fourth gene involved in CCM pathology.

Recently, gain of function mjutations in Pik3ca has been reported in both sporadic and familial CCM, suggesting that like cancer, CCM lesions need to inhibit tumor suppressor genes and activate oncogenes.

== Mechanisms ==
Many molecular mechanisms have been identified in CCM pathology. In 2015 it was reported that the endothelial cells forming cerebral vascular malformations undergo an endothelial to mesenchymal transition in both sporadic and familial CCM

CCM mutant endothelial cells have been reported to undergo clonal expansion and be able to recruit non-mutant cells into the lesions Recently, immunothrombosis and hypoxia have also been reported to be dysregulated in CCM.

== Diagnosis ==
Diagnosis is generally made by magnetic resonance imaging (MRI), particularly using a specific imaging technique known as a gradient-echo sequence MRI, which can unmask small or punctate lesions that may otherwise remain undetected. These lesions are also more conspicuous on FLAIR imaging compared to standard T2 weighing. FLAIR imaging is different from gradient sequences. Rather, it is similar to T2 weighing but suppresses free-flowing fluid signal. Sometimes quiescent CCMs can be revealed as incidental findings during MRI exams ordered for other reasons. Many cavernous hemangiomas are detected "accidentally" during MRIs searching for other pathologies. These "incidentalomas" are generally asymptomatic. In the case of hemorrhage, however, a CT scan is more efficient at showing new blood than an MRI, and when brain hemorrhage is suspected, a CT scan may be ordered first, followed by an MRI to confirm the type of lesion that has bled. Sometimes the lesion appearance imaged by MRI remains inconclusive. Consequently, neurosurgeons will order a cerebral angiogram or magnetic resonance angiogram. Since CCMs are low flow lesions (they are hooked into the venous side of the circulatory system), they will be angiographically occult (invisible). If a lesion is discernible via angiogram in the same location as in the MRI, then an arteriovenous malformation (AVM) becomes the primary concern.

== Treatment ==
Treatment of symptomatic CCM is only via surgery, depending on the location of the lesions. There are no pharmaceuticals currently available to treat CCM. Pharmaceuticals such as; RhoA/Rho inhibitors, mTOR inhibitors, angiogenic inhibitors, antioxidants, and Toll-like receptor 4 antagonists have shown promising results in reducing lesion burden in murine disease models, but are yet to be proven efficient in patients.

== Incidence ==
The incidence in the general population is roughly 0.5%, and clinical symptoms typically appear between 20 and 30 years of age. Once thought to be strictly congenital, these vascular lesions have been found to occur de novo. It may appear either sporadically or exhibit autosomal dominant inheritance. The prevalence of familial CCM is estimated to be around 1 in 5000 to 1 in 10 000.
