= Who's Your Daddy? (House) =

- House episode
- Episode no.: Season 2 Episode 23
- Directed by: Martha Mitchell
- Story by: Charles M. Duncan; John Mankiewicz
- Teleplay by: John Mankiewicz; Lawrence Kaplow
- Original air date: May 16, 2006

Guest appearances
- D. B. Sweeney as Dylan Crandall; Aasha Davis as Leona Baker; Christopher Carley as Patrick Linehan; Ameríca Olivo as Ingrid

Episode chronology
← Previous "House vs. God"	Next → "No Reason"
- House season 2

"Who's Your Daddy?" is the twenty-third episode of the second season of House and the forty-fifth episode overall. The episode aired on Fox on May 16, 2006. The title is in reference to two separate stories in the episode.

== Plot ==
The episode starts with a Hurricane Katrina victim Leona (Aasha Davis), who hallucinates water gushing into a plane she was on. After the hallucination, the scene changes to House, pacing about in his apartment. It's apparent that his leg pain is worse than usual. As he is about to inject himself with morphine, he receives a message from Cuddy, calling about the patient. House accepts the case and meets up with the father, Dylan Crandall (D. B. Sweeney), who is an old friend of House. House is skeptical that Dylan is the father, and tells him that she might just be scamming him.

The team and House ponder what sparked the hallucination, but Leona's heart is perfectly fine in the hospital. Foreman suggests arrhythmia and House decides to proceed in inducing arrhythmia by sending electric pulses to her heart. After getting consent from Dylan, they start the procedure. However, after a few pulses, she gets a heart attack, but no hallucinations. They decide to send another pulse, this time to the right atrium. This pulse starts the hallucination. They freeze the damaged muscle which is near the coronary sinus. As the muscle has been destroyed, House says 'She'll be fine by breakfast.'

Leona gets out of bed after hearing a woman call out for water. As she pulls back the curtain to the other bed, she hallucinates her mother, covered in dirt and weeds, leaking water. As the team wonder what triggered the second hallucination, House comments that it may not be a hallucination but an atypical seizure. He then walks out for a short time, which is explained by Cameron who notices his leg hurts. House then says it might be a flashback post-traumatic stress syndrome. When Cameron asks why he thinks it is not a hallucination, he says her heart problem they fixed would then just be a giant coincidence and then walks out again, only to come back and say there is a possibility some sort of pain is causing her hallucinations. He then leaves again to test try his theory out. During the test, his theory is proven right as Leona hallucinates House's face melting. House says she needs a bone marrow transplant and while they're looking for a donor, Dylan goes into House's office and says he can be the donor as he is her father. He tells House to test his marrow to see if he's a match, but also tells him not to run the paternity test because Dylan will "lose either way".

House arrives at Cuddy's office and upon her asking his medical opinion on her top two sperm donors, he states 'They're losers.' Cuddy walks out, handing him the folders for the other sperm donors. When House is doing his clinic duties, Cuddy brings him to her office and asks House if he has told anyone what she is doing. When he replies with a no, she tells him in vitro needs twice-a-day menotropin injections and she cannot do them herself so she asks House to do it. After the injection, the scene then changes to House, watching Leona in radiation. Wilson comes and asks if the father was a match and House said he was not, but she lucked out and found a match. However, in the middle, fecal matter started to drip out of her mouth. They need to biopsy her liver.

When Wilson is in House's office, he starts to talk about why House cares so much for Dylan, when House reveals that he had once had an affair with Dylan's girlfriend at the time. After Wilson is finished talking and leaves, leaving House to listen to music, he has an epiphany. He pages Foreman to stop the biopsy, and makes them listen to the music he was listening to. House notes that the musician (Leona's grandfather) believes that a note played is out of tune when it is not. House believes this is a symptom the team must take into consideration. After further examining Leona, House notes her skin looks darker than it was before, and since there are no tan lines, he deduces she has deposits of iron and melanin which are both byproducts of haemochromatosis. He tells the team to treat her with deferoxamine and says 'She'll be fine by lunch.' Foreman scans her, and remarks "There's iron, and lots of it".

House is later seen in Cuddy's office, interviewing an intern, Patrick Linehan (Christopher Carley). Cuddy notices he has a lot of quirks, such as laughing in a strange way. It is presumed that he was going to be the sperm donor, as he said he was a "Mozart man". Later, when House is giving Cuddy her injection, she scolds him for showing who her sperm donor was. He tells her she should pick someone she knows and trusts, which Cuddy takes to mean himself. House dismisses this, saying, "Someone you like."

Chase is administering the deferoxamine, but her alveoli sacs rip and she receives no oxygen. House and the team discuss this and they come to the conclusion she has fungus, but they do not know which one. House tells them to go broad, and Cameron suggests Aspergillus. He tells them to give her the anti-fungal for that. Wilson accuses House of running the paternity test from the beginning. Cameron comes in and says Leona's lungs collapsed and they are treating for the wrong fungus. He goes to Leona and asks if she lied to Dylan about where she was. After hesitating twice, she blinks, signaling she did. House discovers that the patient had gone to a recording studio before she experienced the hallucinations. She had inhaled mold in the studio, contracting zygomycosis.

Back in House's office, Cuddy thanks House for the injections. House asks if she came all the way up there just to tell him that, she says "no" and leaves. After House successfully diagnoses the patient, he then admits running the paternity test, and tells the girl that Dylan is her father. As House leaves the patient room, he says to Dylan, "We're even." In the next scene, however, House is shown holding the actual test, which reads "NEGATIVE", indicating that House lied about the test (presumably to spare Dylan's feelings and to assuage his own feeling of guilt for having stolen Dylan's girlfriend long ago). An empty syringe on the table also reveals that House, giving up fighting his psychological pain, took the morphine shown at the beginning of the episode.
