= Amazon Theater =

American short film series

Amazon Theater was a banner under which a suite of five promotional short films was presented via the front page of Amazon.com in 2004. The shorts were commissioned by Amazon, sponsored by Chase Bank, and produced by Ridley and Tony Scott's television commercials company Ridley Scott Associates (RSA). The unifying theme of the shorts was "karma," and each short featured various consumer items that could be purchased via clickable links to the relevant pages on Amazon.com.

== The films ==
Title	Release date	Director	Writer(s)	Actor(s)
Portrait	November 9, 2004	Jordan Scott	Screenplay by David Carter, Greg Hahn, Mike Smith and Christopher Toland, Story by Eric Frost and Jordan Scott	Minnie Driver
An overweight woman is mistreated by her office co-workers until one day her life is transformed by the attention of an unknown portrait photographer.
Agent Orange	November 16, 2004	Tony Scott	David Carter and Terry Rietta	Christopher Carley and Jessica Stam
While waiting in a subway station, a young man catches a glimpse of a beautiful woman, dressed entirely in orange. Before he can reach her, her subway car speeds off. The young man repeatedly visits the station, each time failing to make contact with the mysterious woman.
Do Geese See God	November 23, 2004	David Slade	David Carter and Greg Hahn	Blair Underwood
What goes around comes around—and around—for the frantic Dr. Awkward, a man who needs to take the time to stop and smell the roses.
Tooth Fairy	November 30, 2004	Jake Scott	David Carter and Terry Rietta	Chris Noth, Jacqueline Walker, Wesley Leonard, Marina Brandon, Dana Brandon, and Jeff Bezos
A father forgets to leave money for his daughter from the "tooth fairy". When he tries to make up for it the next night, he finds that she has set up a game for the tooth fairy with several clues leading to the location of the tooth.
Careful What You Wish For	December 7, 2004	Acne (Note: Acne Film is an offshoot of Swedish design agency Acne, and at the time of the production of Careful What You Wish For there were seven directors working collaboratively for the company. The company itself received the directorial credit for this short.)	Screenplay by Greg Hahn, Mike Smith and Christopher Toland, Story by Greg Hahn	Daryl Hannah and Pras Michel
A crooked pawn shop dealer gets his comeuppance.
