= Agent Orange (film) =

- Directed by: Tony Scott
- Written by: David Carter; Terry Rietta
- Produced by: Marjie Abrahams
- Starring: Christopher Carley; Jessica Stam; Troy Cephers
- Cinematography: Steve St. John
- Edited by: Skip Chaisson
- Music by: David Lai
- Release date: November 30, 2004
- Running time: 16 minutes / 5 minutes
- Country: United States

Agent Orange is an American short silent film directed by Tony Scott. The film is about a psychedelic love story taking place in a "shadowy dreamscape". In 2004, the film was shot at 1 and 6 frames per second, noticeably altering motion and exposure. It was produced by Amazon.com's Amazon Theater.

The Orange Boy was played by Christopher Carley, and Orange Girl played by supermodel Jessica Stam. Troy Cephers played the janitor.

It was filmed on a Panavision Hollywood camera, with Eastman Kodak film.

== Plot ==
While waiting in a subway station, a young man catches a glimpse of a beautiful woman, dressed entirely in orange. Before he can reach her, her subway car speeds off.

The young man repeatedly visits the station, each time failing to make contact with the mysterious woman. Revealing he also wears all orange attire.

He plasters posters along the station's walls, only for them to be torn down minutes later by a janitor.

After finally giving up hope, a paper plane lands in front of him. It is one of his posters. He looks up to see his dream girl. They stare at each other, before smiling.
