= Failure to communicate =

Failure to communicate may refer to:

- "What we've got here is failure to communicate", a line from the 1967 film Cool Hand Luke
- "Failure to Communicate," an episode of the television series House
- "A Failure to Communicate" is the fourth episode of the sixth season of the television series Oz
