= Things to Do in Denver When You're Dead =

1995 film by Gary Fleder

- Theatrical release poster
- Directed by: Gary Fleder
- Written by: Scott Rosenberg
- Produced by: Cary Woods
- Starring: Andy García; Christopher Lloyd; William Forsythe; Bill Nunn; Treat Williams; Jack Warden; Steve Buscemi; Fairuza Balk; Gabrielle Anwar; Christopher Walken
- Cinematography: Elliot Davis
- Edited by: Richard Marks
- Music by: Michael Convertino
- Production company: Woods Entertainment
- Distributed by: Miramax Films
- Release date: December 1, 1995
- Running time: 115 minutes
- Country: United States
- Language: English
- Budget: $8 million
- Box office: $529,677

Things to Do in Denver When You're Dead is a 1995 American crime drama film directed by Gary Fleder and written by Scott Rosenberg. The film features an ensemble cast that includes Andy García, Christopher Lloyd, William Forsythe, Bill Nunn, Treat Williams, Steve Buscemi, Christopher Walken, Fairuza Balk, and Gabrielle Anwar.

The film's title comes from a Warren Zevon song of the same name, recorded on his 1991 album Mr. Bad Example, which he allowed under the condition that the song be played during the end credits. The lead character's name, "Jimmy the Saint," comes from the Bruce Springsteen song "Lost in the Flood" from his 1973 album Greetings from Asbury Park, N.J. The film was screened in the Un Certain Regard section at the 1995 Cannes Film Festival.

The film was a box office bomb and received negative reviews from critics, with many dismissing it as a "Pulp Fiction clone".

== Plot ==
Trying to go straight, ex-gangster Jimmy "The Saint" Tosnia runs Afterlife Advice in Denver, where dying people videotape messages for their loved ones. His business isn't doing well and his former boss, a crime lord known as "The Man With The Plan," has bought up his debt in order to command a favor involving the crime lord's son, Bernard, who has been arrested for child molestation. The Man With The Plan, who was left a quadriplegic after an attempt on his life, wants Jimmy to persuade Bernard's ex-girlfriend Meg to come back to him; The Man With the Plan believes this will cure Bernard of his pedophilia.

A reluctant Jimmy recruits his friends Easy Wind, Pieces, Big Bear Franchise and the rage-prone Critical Bill. The plan is to have Pieces and Critical Bill pose as police officers, intercept Meg's current boyfriend Bruce, and intimidate him until he agrees to break up with Meg. Things go wrong when Bruce becomes suspicious of the two men's identities and mocks them, whereupon Critical Bill stabs Bruce in the throat. The commotion wakes up Meg, sleeping in the back of Bruce's van. Her appearance startles Pieces, who accidentally shoots her dead. The Man With The Plan is furious at the outcome of their botched mission. He informs Jimmy that he will allow him to live, as long as he leaves Denver, but his crew have been sentenced to "buckwheats" – to be assassinated in a gruesome and painful manner.

Jimmy's friends come to terms with their impending deaths as they are stalked by a hit man, Mr. Shhh, who never fails. Pieces accepts his fate, with Mr. Shhh providing a quick death. Easy Wind goes into hiding with a gang lord called Baby Sinister but is given up after Mr. Shhh infiltrates and kills most of Sinister's entourage. Because Franchise has a family to raise, Jimmy pleads with The Man With The Plan to spare his life. The Man With The Plan agrees to Jimmy's terms but betrays him anyway by having Franchise killed. The betrayal makes Jimmy vengeful; in turn, Jimmy is also sentenced to die.

Mr. Shhh finally locates Critical Bill holed up in his apartment, but is ambushed by Bill and the two kill each other. In the wake of Mr. Shhh's death, the contract on Jimmy falls to a trio of Mexican brothers. In his final hours, Jimmy says goodbye to Dagney, a young woman he had fallen in love with. Knowing that he will most likely be killed, Jimmy murders Bernard for all the misery he indirectly brought upon the group. He also impregnates Lucinda, a prostitute, in order to fulfill her wish of becoming a mother. In a pre-recorded Afterlife Advice video, Jimmy gives life advice to his unborn child. The trio of killers catches up to Jimmy and he takes his death gracefully. The Man With The Plan is seen mourning his son's death. Jimmy and his friends are then seen together having "boat drinks" in the afterlife.

== Cast ==
- Andy Garcia as Jimmy "The Saint" Tosnia
- Christopher Lloyd as Olden "Pieces" Polymeros
- William Forsythe as Francis "Big Bear Franchise" Chiser
- Bill Nunn as Earl "Easy Wind" Denton
- Treat Williams as "Critical" Bill Dolittle
- Jack Warden as Joe Heff
- Steve Buscemi as "Mr. Shhh"
- Fairuza Balk as Lucinda
- Gabrielle Anwar as Dagney
- Christopher Walken as The Man with the Plan
- Michael Nicolosi as Bernard
- Bill Cobbs as Malt
- Marshall Bell as Lieutenant Atwater
- Glenn Plummer as "Baby Sinister"
- Don Stark as Gus
- Willie Garson as Cuffy
- Jenny McCarthy as Blonde Nurse
- Buddy Guy as House Band
- Josh Charles as Bruce (uncredited)
- Sarah Trigger as Meg
- Don Cheadle as "Rooster"
- Tiny Lister as "House"
- Wiley Harker as Boris Carlotti
- Bill Bolender as Stevie's Dad
- Bill Erwin as 70-Year-Old Man
- Christopher C. Romero as Montirez

== Distribution ==
Miramax presold the Japanese distribution rights to Shochiku along with Four Rooms, George T. Miller's Robinson Crusoe, John Ehle's The Journey of August King and Joe Chappelle's Halloween: The Curse of Michael Myers in a bulk acquisition deal.

== Reception ==
Produced on a budget of $8 million, the film made under $530,000 upon its limited release.

On Rotten Tomatoes it has a rating of 35% based on reviews from 31 critics, with an average rating of 5.30/10. The site's critical consensus states, "Just watch a Tarantino movie instead—and buy a Warren Zevon record while you're at it." Metacritic, which uses a weighted average, assigned the film a score of 45 out of 100, based on 16 critics, indicating "mixed or average" reviews.

Roger Ebert of the Chicago Sun-Times wrote: "On balance, I think it's an interesting miss, but a movie you might enjoy if (a) you don't expect a masterpiece, and (b) you like the dialogue in Quentin Tarantino movies."

In 2015, Chris Bumbray of JoBlo.com cited it as an example of a "Tarantino clone" film, alongside Keys to Tulsa and Truth or Consequences, N.M., which were both released in 1997.

== Home media ==
Buena Vista Home Entertainment (under the Miramax Home Entertainment banner) released the film on VHS in 1996, with the film also receiving a U.S. LaserDisc release on September 25, 1996. Buena Vista Home Entertainment/Miramax Home Entertainment went on to issue it on DVD in 1999.

In December 2010, Miramax was sold by The Walt Disney Company, its owners since 1993. That same month, the studio was taken over by private equity firm Filmyard Holdings. Filmyard licensed the home media rights for several Miramax titles to Lionsgate, which reissued Things to Do in Denver When You're Dead on DVD on January 6, 2012. In 2011, Filmyard Holdings licensed the Miramax library to streamer Netflix. The streaming deal included Things to Do in Denver When You're Dead, and ran for five years, eventually ending on June 1, 2016.

Filmyard Holdings sold Miramax to Qatari company beIN Media Group in March 2016. In April 2020, ViacomCBS (now known as Paramount Skydance) acquired the rights to Miramax's library, after buying a 49% stake in the studio from beIN. Things to Do in Denver When You're Dead is among the 700 titles it acquired in the deal and, since April 2020, the film has been distributed by Paramount Pictures.

On July 27, 2021, Paramount Home Entertainment reissued the film on DVD, being one of many Miramax titles that it reissued around that time. Paramount licensed the film to Australian distributor Imprint, which released a Blu-ray edition in that country on July 27, 2022. Paramount then licensed the film to U.S. company Kino Lorber for a 4K restoration. Kino Lorber released the restored version on a 4K Ultra HD Blu-ray on April 29, 2025.

Paramount made the film available on its subscription streaming service Paramount+, as well as on its free streaming service Pluto TV.

== See also ==
- Tarantinoesque film
