= Sarah Trigger =

British actress

- Born: Sarah Louise Trigger; 12 June 1968 (age 58); London, England
- Occupation: Actress
- Years active: 1990–2005
- Spouse: Jon Cryer (1999–2004)
- Children: 2

Sarah Louise Trigger (born 12 June 1968) is a British actress. Her film appearances include Bill & Ted's Bogus Journey, Pet Sematary Two, Deadfall and Things to Do in Denver When You're Dead.

== Biography ==
Trigger began her career in the early 1990s, mainly participating in American film and television productions. Her film credits include movies like Bill & Ted's Bogus Journey, Deadfall, Things to Do in Denver When You're Dead, Pet Sematary Two, El Diablo and Grand Canyon. On television, she made appearances in series such as Monsters, 21 Jump Street, Chicago Hope and Turks.

She was married to American actor Jon Cryer from 1999 to 2004. The couple had a son, Charlie Austin.

== Filmography ==
=== Film ===
Year	Film	Role
1990	Kid	Kate
1991	Bill & Ted's Bogus Journey	Joanna
1991	Paradise	Darlene Pike
1991	Grand Canyon	Vanessa
1992	Pet Sematary Two	Marjorie Hargrove
1993	Deadfall	Diane
1994	PCU	Samantha
1994	A Gift from Heaven	Cousin Anna
1994	Don't Do It	Alicia
1995	Destiny Turns on the Radio	Francine
1995	Things to Do in Denver When You're Dead	Meg
1996	Good Luck	Heidi
1997	Psycho Sushi	Harper

=== Television ===
Year	Show	Role	Notes
1990	Monsters	Edwina	1 episode
1990	Screen Two	Gloria	1 episode
1990	21 Jump Street	Frances Van Every	1 episode
1990	Nasty Boys	Kathy Heckland	1 episode
1990	El Diablo	Nettie Tuleen	TV movie
1991	The Last to Go	Sharon	TV movie
1991	Aftermath: A Test of Love	Wendy	TV movie
1992	Final Shot: The Hank Gathers Story	Role Unknown	TV movie
1992	Lifestories: Families in Crisis	Allison	1 episode
1995	Chicago Hope	Melissa Cole	1 episode
1995	Original Sins	Laura	TV movie
1996-1997	EZ Streets	Elli Rooney	12 episodes
1997	Too Close to Home	Abigail Emma "Abby" Fletcher	TV movie
1998	Brooklyn South	Lorraine Matarazzo	1 episode
1999	Turks	Erin Turk	13 episodes
1999	A.T.F.	Carol	TV movie
1999	Family Law	Role Unknown	1 episode
1999	Hefner: Unauthorized	Millie	TV movie
2005	CSI: Miami	Patty Johanson	1 episode
