= The Rosemarys =

The Rosemarys were an early-mid-1990s band from San Francisco. Their sound was associated with the dreampop-shoegazing style of music.

The band released two albums - their debut Providence and a second, self-titled release - before falling out with their record label and eventually splitting up.

The band was known for having a very dreamy and ambient sound and were popular with the 90s underground independent San Francisco rock movement and the ecstasy scene. The use of reverbed and overlaying guitars were very prominent with often ecstatic and dark subdued lyrics.

Their song "Catherine", was featured briefly in the X-Files episode "D.P.O." under the title "Mary Beth Clarke, I Love You", an in-joke referencing a fan of the show.

== Members ==
- Matt Greenberg (Keyboards)
- Patrick Harte (Drums)
- Tim Ong (Bass/Vocals)
- Ian Parks (Guitar/vocals)
- Peter Weldon (Guitar)

== Discography ==
- 'Providence' (Continuum 1993)
- 'The Rosemarys' (RCA 1994)

== Compilations ==
- 'PCU (Original Soundtrack)' (Arista 1994) - Features the track 'Catherine'
