= Kid (1990 film) =

- Directed by: John Mark Robinson
- Written by: Leslie Bohem
- Produced by: Peter Abrams; J.P. Guerin; Robert L. Levy
- Starring: C. Thomas Howell; Sarah Trigger; Brian Austin Green
- Cinematography: Robert D. Yeoman
- Music by: Tim Truman
- Release date: 2 November 1990 (UK)
- Running time: 91 minutes
- Country: United States
- Language: English

Kid (also known as Back for Revenge) is a 1990 vigilante film.

== Cast ==
- C. Thomas Howell — Kid
- Sarah Trigger — Kate
- Brian Austin Green — Metal Louie
- R. Lee Ermey — Luke
- Dale Dye — Garvey
- Michael Bowen — Harlan
- Damon Martin — Pete
- Lenore Kasdorf — Alice
- Michael Cavanaugh — Walters
- Tony Epper — Truck
- Don Collier — Clarke
- Don Baker — Jamie
- Don Starr — Bleeker
- Fred Sugerman — Dad
- Heather McNair — Mom

== Filming Locations ==
One of the locations was at Old Tucson - 201 S. Kinney Road, Tucson, Arizona, USA.
