= Spin (House) =

- House episode
- Episode no.: Season 2 Episode 6
- Directed by: Fred Gerber
- Written by: Sara Hess
- Original air date: November 15, 2005

Guest appearances
- Sela Ward as Stacy Warner; Currie Graham as Mark Warner; Alanna Ubach as Dr. Louise Harper; Tom Lenk as Allen; Nathan Kress as Scott; Taraji P. Henson as Moira; Kristoffer Polaha as Jeff Forrester

Episode chronology
← Previous "Daddy's Boy"	Next → "Hunting"
- House season 2

"Spin" is the sixth episode of the second season of House, which premiered on Fox on November 15, 2005. Written by Sara Hess, it was directed by Fred Gerber.

The episode explores how far a sports icon is willing to go to win, and how far the character of House will go to win Stacy back. Guest stars include Sela Ward as Stacy Warner and Kristoffer Polaha as Jeff the cyclist.

== Summary ==
Jeff, a well-known cyclist, is cycling in a non-profit charity race, when he is unable to breathe and taken to the hospital. House finds it surprising that Jeff admitted he is taking illegal enhancement drugs. He agreed to blood doping, which is common among cyclists, to better one's athletic performance. Because red blood cells carry oxygen between the lungs and the muscles, a higher number of red blood cells can increase an athlete's endurance. While trying to figure out what cause of Jeff's respiratory distress, they find an air embolus in his chest. While Dr. Chase works to remove the air bubble, Jeff begins to feel numbness in his legs, but is told that it might be due to the sedation. While his manager talks to the press, Jeff loses feeling in his legs. Dr. Cameron informs House that Jeff's red blood count is continually dropping, revealing that his body is no longer able to produce red blood cells on its own. House becomes convinced that Jeff lied about a specific drug that could be the cause of all of his symptoms, erythropoietin (EPO), a hormone produced in the kidney that promotes the formation of red blood cells by the bone marrow. Adding more red blood cells increases the oxygen level in the blood, thus presumably causing all of Jeff's symptoms as he fails to produce red blood cells on his own. This explains him also having anemia, caused by chronic Acquired Pure Red Cell Aplasia (PRCA), probably resulting from blood doping. After responding to prednisone, Jeff begins losing more red blood cells, to the point of requiring a transfusion. House scans Jeff's neck and a thymoma is discovered; an extremely rare tumor on the thymus, confirming that he wasn't taking EPO, but did have Chronic Acquired Pure Red Cell Aplasia. Due to the diagnosis he can legally blood dope or get a thymectomy, which could only bring a temporary remission, after which he would have to be on medical steroids.
