= The Mistake (House) =

- House episode
- Episode no.: Season 2 Episode 8
- Directed by: David Semel
- Written by: Peter Blake
- Original air date: November 29, 2005

Guest appearances
- Sela Ward as Stacy Warner; Allison Smith as Kayla McGinley; Ryan Hurst as Sam McGinley; John Lafayette as Dr. Schisgal; John Rubinstein as Dr. Ayersman; Greg Winter as Chuck; Stephanie Venditto as Nurse Brenda Previn

Episode chronology
← Previous "Hunting"	Next → "Deception"
- House season 2

"The Mistake" is the eighth episode of the second season of House, which premiered on Fox on November 29, 2005. The episode is told in flashbacks when the hospital and Chase's career is on the line.

== Plot ==
Throughout the episode the story of the patient's death is presented through flashback as Chase and House share the story with Stacy. Both Chase and House lie about the reason for his mistake, resulting in multiple conflicting narratives.

The episode's cold opening is set in a school auditorium, where a dedicated mother, Kayla McGinley is watching her daughters, Dory and Niki, perform in a recital. While sitting in the audience, Kayla suddenly screams from severe stomach pain. Her screams cause her daughters and the crowd to focus their attention on her.

In the first scene with House and Wilson Wilson references House breaking into Stacy's therapist's office "Nixon did that and got impeached." Nixon wasn't impeached. He resigned before the full House of Representatives could vote on the Articles of Impeached.

Cuddy then consults Stacy, as the hearing for the McGinley case is coming up soon. Stacy refuses to work with House, but Cuddy forces her, stating that as House is the cause of most legal trouble in the hospital, if Stacy is unable to work with him, she will be unable to work at the hospital. As House and Wilson are playing a coin game in House's office, Stacy walks in and informs him that his presence will be needed at the hearing. Stacy then begins the consult with Chase, who relates the story of Kayla months earlier. Kayla first came into the clinic, presenting with severe pain. Foreman performed the exam and discovered uveitis, prompting House to take over the case. As the team is performing the initial diagnosis meeting, Chase spills House's bottle of Vicodin, causing House to force him to take over the case.

Chase finds ulcers, leading him to believe it is Behçet's disease, and prescribes textbook treatment. When Kayla returns for the test, Chase, who was just on the phone, is distracted and fails to ask further questions when she complains of further stomach pains. This is the titular "mistake" of the episode. Kayla is then brought in again later, and the team finds two bleeding ulcers, one of which has already perforated, resulting in sepsis and major damage to her organs.

Kayla's liver is too damaged, and she needs a new one. However, her blood type is rare (AB−) and although she is high on the transplant list, chances are low she will get one in the next couple of days. Her brother, Sam, offers to donate his own liver, because he is a perfect match. House goes to one of the hospital's surgeons and tries to bribe him to perform the operation. When he does not comply with House, House then blackmails him with information about the surgeon cheating on his wife, which is successful. However, after the operation, House tells the surgeon's wife anyway, after which the wife keys her husband's car.

During a routine checkup two months later, Chase discover Kayla is running a slight temperature, which should not happen with the medication she's on. She then spikes a fever an hour later. Chase believes it is strep, but Sam then arrives and brings up the possibility of hepatitis. House realizes Sam has hepatitis C, which was transplanted along with the liver given to Kayla. House then deduces that both patients now have liver cancer. Kayla needs a new liver once again, and once again is exempt because of the cancer.

As Chase is being interrogated in Cuddy's office, he reveals the real reason for the lawsuit. After discovering Kayla will not be able to obtain a legitimate transplant, Sam went to the black market and found a doctor in Mexico willing to perform the operation. Although at first Chase is willing to go along with it, he is convinced by Foreman and Cameron to tell the truth to Kayla: that she will die regardless. Kayla ends up not getting the operation and dies. Months later, Sam comes to the hospital for a checkup and Chase, guilt-ridden, tells Sam that he was hungover during the checkup resulting in him not further questioning Kayla's stomach pains, misdiagnosing her ulcer and ultimately killing her. Sam is furious and sues the hospital.

As Stacy and Cuddy are reeling from this revelation, House takes Chase outside, when he accuses Chase of lying: Chase was not distracted in the checkup because he was hungover, he was distracted because he had just received a phone call bearing the news that his father had died from lung cancer. House reveals that he knew about his father's cancer but promised not to tell Chase about it. As Chase decides to tell the truth during the hearing, Stacy admits she still has feelings for House, hinting at the possibility of them getting back together.

The panel decides to penalize both Chase and House; Chase receiving one week of suspension and a letter in his permanent file for lying to both his superiors and Sam, while House is cited for his "troubling" conduct (including allegations of blackmail along with refusing to meet with patients) that results in him having his practice supervised by another doctor for at least one month (as chosen by Cuddy). Furious about the supervision, House attempts to fire Chase, but is stopped by Foreman, who has been appointed to be his supervisor.

== Reception ==
The episode received 14.91 million viewers.
