= Clueless (House) =

- House episode
- Episode no.: Season 2 Episode 15
- Directed by: Deran Serafian
- Written by: Thomas L. Moran
- Original air date: March 28, 2006

Guest appearances
- Samantha Mathis as Maria Palko; Eddie Mills as Bob Palko; Peter Birkenhead as Vincent Lambert; Stephanie Erb as Charlotte Lambert; Yareli Arizmendi as Lady

Episode chronology
← Previous "Sex Kills"	Next → "Safe"
- House season 2

"Clueless" is the fifteenth episode of the second season of House and thirty-seventh overall, which premiered on Fox on March 28, 2006. It was written by Thomas L. Moran and directed by Deran Serafian.

== Plot ==
The episode's cold opening begins with Maria being violently grabbed and carried to the bedroom by a man. As he attempts to force her onto the bed, he begins to have difficulty breathing. It is then revealed that the man is not a rapist, but rather her husband, Bob, who was engaging in a rape fantasy with her.

Meanwhile, Wilson has been staying over with House due to problems at home. House and Wilson agree that Wilson will move out the next day.

House leads the team in a differential diagnosis of Bob's breathing difficulty. House is convinced that the symptoms are typical of heavy metal poisoning, but none of the tests confirm that diagnosis. House decides that Maria must be poisoning Bob, as any heavy metal that could enter his system by other means has been tested for. House searches Maria, but finds nothing.

Still certain that Maria is the culprit, House retrieves a vial of liquid to test his theory, instructing Cameron to prevent Maria from using the bathroom until he returns. House enters the restroom just as she is leaving the stall, takes hold of her hands, and apologizes for his inability to properly treat Bob. However, when House lets go of her hands, the fingertips are stained purple. He explains that the only way to confirm his theory was by way of a gold indicator, (Tin(II) chloride), which reduces gold ions to colored colloidal gold. By applying the indicator to his hands and touching Maria's hand after she went to the bathroom, he confirms his suspicion that Maria was killing Bob with sodium aurothiomalate.

At the end, House erases a message from a realtor to Wilson.

== Music ==
This episode features Al Green's "Love and Happiness".

== Reception ==
This episode originally aired on March 28, 2006, and averaged 21.44 million viewers.
