= Turks (TV series) =

- Genre: Police procedural; Drama
- Created by: Robert Singer
- Starring: William Devane; David Cubitt; Helen Carey; Matthew John Armstrong; Sarah Trigger
- Composer: Brad Fiedel
- Country of origin: United States
- Original language: English
- No. of seasons: 1
- No. of episodes: 13

Production
- Producers: Jim Michaels; Phil Sgriccia; Chris Long
- Running time: 60 minutes
- Production companies: December 3rd Productions; Studios USA Television

Original release
- Network: CBS
- Release: January 21 – April 23, 1999

Turks is an American police drama television series created by Robert Singer. It aired on CBS from January 21, 1999 to April 23, 1999.

== Premise ==
Set in Chicago, the series centered on the Turks, an Irish American family of police officers and their work and family lives. The hangout for the cops is called Emmitts.

== Cast ==
- William Devane as Sgt. Joseph Turk
- David Cubitt as Mike Turk
- Matthew John Armstrong as Joey Turk
- Michael Muhney as Paul Turk
- Helen Carey as Mary Turk
- Sarah Trigger as Erin Turk
- Ashley Crow as Ginny

== Episodes ==
No.	Title	Directed by	Written by	Original release date
1	"Pilot"	Robert Singer	Robert Singer	January 21, 1999
2	"After the Pilot"	Philip Sgriccia	Robert Singer	January 28, 1999
3	"Hearts of Fire"	Robert Singer	David Peckinpah	February 4, 1999
4	"Tail"	David Grossman	David Israel	February 11, 1999
5	"Lend Me Your Ears"	Chris Long	Gay Walch	February 18, 1999
6	"In the Fracas"	Unknown	Unknown	February 25, 1999
7	"About Number Ten"	Philip Sgriccia	Story by : Edmond Stevens; Teleplay by : Edmond Stevens & Robert Singer	March 4, 1999
8	"Friends and Strangers"	Unknown	Unknown	March 25, 1999
9	"Fathers and Sins"	Unknown	Unknown	April 1, 1999
10	"Siege"	Robert Singer	Story by : David Peckinpah; Teleplay by : David Peckinpah and Brad Buckner & Eugenie Ross-Leming	April 8, 1999
11	"Overkill"	Chris Long	David Israel	April 15, 1999
12	"Shades of Gray"	Unknown	Unknown	April 22, 1999
13	"Live, Love, Lose and Learn"	Unknown	Unknown	April 23, 1999

== Bibliography ==
- Tim Brooks and Earle Marsh, The Complete Directory to Prime Time Network and Cable TV Shows 1946–Present, Ninth edition (New York: Ballantine Books, 2007) ISBN 978-0-345-49773-4
