= PCU (film) =

1994 American comedy film

- Theatrical release poster
- Directed by: Hart Bochner
- Written by: Adam Leff; Zak Penn
- Produced by: Paul Schiff
- Starring: Jeremy Piven; Chris Young; David Spade; Megan Ward; Sarah Trigger; Jessica Walter
- Cinematography: Reynaldo Villalobos
- Edited by: Nicholas C. Smith
- Music by: Steve Vai
- Distributed by: 20th Century Fox
- Release date: April 29, 1994
- Running time: 80 minutes
- Country: United States
- Language: English
- Budget: <$10 million
- Box office: $4,330,020

PCU is a 1994 American comedy film written by Adam Leff and Zak Penn and directed by Hart Bochner about college life at the fictional Port Chester University, and represents "an exaggerated view of contemporary college life". The film is based on the experiences of Leff and Penn at Eclectic Society at Wesleyan University in Middletown, Connecticut.

== Plot ==
Preppy pre-freshman (pre-frosh) Tom Lawrence visits Port Chester University (PCU), a college where fraternities have been outlawed and political correctness is rampant. During his visit, accident-prone Tom makes enemies with nearly every group of students, and thus spends much of his visit evading the growing mob after him.

During his visit, Tom finds himself in the middle of a war between "The Pit" and "Balls and Shaft", two rival groups. Among the members of the latter is Rand McPherson, who, with the other Balls and Shaft members, want the outlawed Greek system to return.

Meanwhile, "The Pit" runs the former "Balls and Shaft" frat house in a highly disorganized manner. Inhabited by seniors Gutter and Mullaney, mid-year freshman co-ed Katy, and led by multi-year senior James "Droz" Andrews, The Pit is a party-centric house that rebels against politically correct protests; their counter-protests and parties are a frequent source of complaint forms.

Other factions on campus include a commune-style house of pot users called Jerrytown that Gutter frequents, a radical feminist group known as the Womynists, an Afrocentric group suspecting The Pit of conspiring against them, and the college president, Ms. Garcia-Thompson, who is obsessed with enforcing "sensitivity awareness" and multiculturalism to an extreme. She proposes that Bisexual Asian Studies should have its own building at the expense of funding for STEM facilities, as well as a plan to change the campus mascot to a whooping crane instead of an offensive Native American character during their bicentennial anniversary.

Garcia-Thompson conspires behind closed doors with Balls and Shaft to get the established residents of The Pit kicked off campus and give Rand control of the house. She provokes The Pit residents with a damage bill from their past semester. Left unpaid, the campus would seize their house, leaving them homeless and unable to continue attending PCU without getting jobs.

The Pit responds by throwing a party to raise the funds needed. The Womynists take offense to The Pit's flyers advertising the party and hold a protest outside as the house residents conspire to steal alcohol and convince students to attend. The party at first appears to be a failure. However, a series of unlikely events results in George Clinton and Parliament-Funkadelic performing at the party. Students begin streaming in (initially to seize Tom for his prior mistakes) and the party successfully raises the funds to keep the house.

Garcia-Thompson (after being locked in a room by Droz with the song "Afternoon Delight" playing on repeat), decides to act on the many complaints against The Pit. She shuts down the party and expels the residents of The Pit in spite of their fundraising efforts. Tom then informs Droz about an overheard conversation with the Board of Trustees: the President's politically correct changes are negatively affecting both their past legacy and media publicity.

At the bicentennial ceremony the following morning, Droz and former Pit residents succeed in liberating the Whooping Crane and provoking the other students into an impromptu protest against protesting (chanting "We're not gonna protest!"). The demonstration establishes that even with The Pit shut down, the President cannot control the student population, resulting in the Board of Trustees summarily firing her. Meanwhile, Rand goes on a rather sexist, racist and homophobic tirade about all the other student groups, unaware that Droz has surreptitiously used the podium microphone to broadcast his rant to the entire campus.

Later, Tom heads home, having decided to commit to PCU as The Pit has moved back into their house. As he sits on the bus, he sees Rand, who is now in Tom's position at the beginning of the film: being chased by the students across campus.

== Cast ==
The Pit

- Jeremy Piven as James "Droz" Andrews
- Chris Young as Tom Lawrence
- Alex Désert as Mullaney
- Jon Favreau as Gutter
- Megan Ward as Katy
- Gale Mayron as Cecilia
- Matt Ross as Raji
- Jake Grace and Darin Heames as "The Daves"
- Stivi Paskoski as Deege
- Jody Racicot as Pigman

Balls & Shaft

- David Spade as Rand McPherson
- Kevin Jubinville as Carter Prescott
- Thomas Mitchell as Bantam Draper

Womynist House

- Sarah Trigger as Samantha
- Viveka Davis as Womynist #1
- Maddie Corman as Womynist #2

Jerrytown

- Jake Busey as Mersh
- Ted Kozma as Kosmo
- Theo Caldwell as "The Giggler"

Group Leaders

- Becky Thyre as Moonbeam, Cause-Heads
- Kevin Thigpen as Afrocentrist
- Rob Gfroerer as Computer Geek
- Jonathan Wilson as Gay Activist

The Establishment

- Jessica Walter as President Garcia-Thompson
- Colin Fox as Trustee #1
- Larry Reynolds as Trustees #2

Others

- George Clinton as Himself
- Parliament-Funkadelic appearing as Themselves

== Production ==
In January 1993, it was announced Adam Leff and Zak Penn were developing PCU at 20th Century Fox, a comedy poking fun at political correctness on college campuses.

Jeremy Piven complains in the DVD audio commentary that actors were not allowed by the director to improvise at all. He was able to include some limited improvisation by appealing to the writers directly.

== Reception ==
On Rotten Tomatoes the film has an approval rating of 50% based on reviews from 18 critics. On Metacritic the film has a score of 42% based on reviews from 13 critics, indicating "mixed or average reviews".

Roger Ebert said the film "begins with a terrific premise, but immediately loses faith in it." It has also been ranked among the ten best college movies by The Huffington Post.

With a budget of $8 million, it grossed $2,129,483 on opening weekend contributing to a final domestic total of $4,330,020.

== Soundtrack ==
PCU (Music From The Motion Picture)

Soundtrack album by Various Artists
- Released: May 10, 1994
- Genres: Grunge, Pop, Rock, Metal, Funk
- Length: 50:01
- Label: Fox / Arista
- Producer: Ralph Sall

The soundtrack, released on May 10, 1994, by Fox / Arista, features songs from the feature film. Steve Vai wrote the score for the movie, which he would later release on his compilation album The Elusive Light and Sound Vol. 1. The album is notable for Mudhoney's cover of "Pump It Up".

Track listing
No.	Title	Writer(s)	Performed by	Length
1.	"Pump It Up"	Elvis Costello	Mudhoney	3:14
2.	"Rilly Groovy"		Beautiful People	4:44
3.	"Stomp"		George Clinton	4:48
4.	"What's Wrong with Me"		Redd Kross	4:53
5.	"Slackjawed"		The Connells	3:59
6.	"Erotic City"	Prince	George Clinton	4:25
7.	"Catherine" (Not featured in the film)		The Rosemarys	3:05
8.	"Year of the Girl"		Swervedriver	5:23
9.	"Wonderful Lie"		Mexico 70	3:27
10.	"Now We Run"		Steve Vai	3:44
11.	"Drinking and Driving"	Greg Ginn, Henry Rollins	Stick	3:59
12.	"Tribe"		Gruntruck	5:06
Total length:				55:16
