= Deadfall (1993 film) =

1993 film by Christopher Coppola

- Theatrical film poster
- Directed by: Christopher Coppola
- Written by: Christopher Coppola; Nick Vallelonga
- Produced by: Mark Amin; Gerson Fox; Gertrude Fox; Ted Fox
- Starring: Michael Biehn; Sarah Trigger; Nicolas Cage; James Coburn; Peter Fonda; Charlie Sheen; Talia Shire
- Cinematography: Maryse Alberti
- Edited by: Phillip Linson
- Music by: Jim Fox
- Distributed by: Trimark Pictures
- Release date: October 8, 1993
- Running time: 98 minutes
- Country: United States
- Language: English
- Budget: $3.4 million
- Box office: $18,369

Deadfall is a 1993 American crime drama film directed by Christopher Coppola. Coppola co-wrote the script with Nick Vallelonga. The film stars Michael Biehn, Coppola's brother Nicolas Cage, Sarah Trigger, Charlie Sheen, James Coburn, and Peter Fonda. It is also the prime influence on the song "Deadfall" written by the American hardcore punk band Snot. A prequel/sequel, Arsenal, starring Cage reprising his role as Eddie King, was released in 2017.

== Plot ==
After con artist Joe Donan accidentally kills his father, Mike, during a sting, Joe tries to carry out Mike's dying wish to recover "the cake". Joe goes in search of his father's look-alike brother, Lou. Uncle Lou is also a con artist and tries to enlist Joe in one of his schemes. But Joe falls in love with Lou's assistant's girlfriend, Diane. Joe and Diane decide to steal the proceeds from the con and run away. When the con goes wrong and Uncle Lou gets shot, Joe flees with the money—only to run into his father, Mike, alive and well. Joe learns that Mike and Diane were working together to double-cross Lou. Enraged, Joe shoots at Mike, only to discover the bullets are blanks. The film ends with Joe walking away from Mike.

== Cast ==
- Michael Biehn as Joe Donan
- Sarah Trigger as Diane
- Nicolas Cage as Eddie King
- James Coburn as Mike Donan / Lou Donan
- Peter Fonda as Pete
- Charlie Sheen as Morgan "Fats" Gripp
- Talia Shire as Sam
- Michael Constantine as Frank
- Gigi Rice as Blanche
- Angus Scrimm as Dr. Lyme
- Micky Dolenz as Bart
- Ron Taylor as The Baby

== Production ==
Val Kilmer was initially cast to play the role of Joe. He left the film at the last minute because he apparently didn't get along with the producer. He instead did The Real McCoy. Christopher Coppola accused him of breaking his contract and leaving because he was offered $1 million for the other project. After he left, Trimark Pictures slashed the budget from $8 million to $3.4 million.

After producer Ted Fox had delivered the film to Trimark $240,000 under budget, Trimark asked for the money to be used on reshots but Fox refused. The bond company, Completion Bond, took over the film to do the reshoots. Litigation to resolve who met the cost of the reshoots delayed the release of the film. It is claimed that the initial underspend was actually supposed to go to Christopher Coppola but he put it back into the production and didn't get a single cent.

When the film premiered, the lab made a mistake on the print and they double printed the awkward sex scene, meaning the scene played twice back to back. The studio didn't bother checking the print.

== Critical reception ==
Metacritic, which uses a weighted average, assigned the film a score of 42 out of 100, based on five critics, indicating "mixed or average" reviews.

Kevin Thomas described it as "a hopelessly callow, leaden-paced attempt at film noir."

Star Michael Biehn called this one of the worst films he ever made.
