= Deception (House) =

- House episode
- Episode no.: Season 2 Episode 9
- Directed by: Deran Sarafian
- Written by: Michael R. Perry
- Original air date: December 13, 2005

Guest appearance
- Cynthia Nixon as Anica Jovanovich

Episode chronology
← Previous "The Mistake"	Next → "Failure to Communicate"
- House season 2

"Deception" is the ninth episode of the second season of House, which premiered on Fox on December 13, 2005. After House is replaced temporarily by Foreman as department head, problems arise as House tries to make life miserable for him.

== Plot ==
While House is at off-track betting, a woman named Anica who is standing next to him has a seizure. House tells the bystanders to call the paramedics and to take her to Princeton-Plainsboro. Foreman thinks she has DIC due to the alcohol in her system, and House thinks that she has Cushing's syndrome. Cameron thinks that Anica is injecting herself with adrenocorticotropic hormone, which causes Cushing's, because she has Münchausen syndrome. In order to prove herself right, she puts antibiotics on a desk in front of Anica with a warning label that says dangerous. Foreman then gets a call that Anica's urine has turned orange, which confirms the Munchausen's diagnosis, because it means Anica took the Antibiotics Cameron had baited her with, despite the warnings.

The team is convinced that she has Münchausen's and want to discharge her. House suggests Münchausen's and aplastic anemia, but Foreman will not allow him to do any more tests. Before Anica leaves the hospital, House tells her that she has aplastic anemia and that he needs to inject her with a drug, Colchicine, that will make her seem sick in order to confirm his diagnosis. Anica collapses and begins convulsing. She is sent back to the hospital the next day and begins irradiation treatment.

Meanwhile, House sits in Anica's room and notices a strange odor. After sniffing Anica's pillow and bra, he realizes that she has an infection and stops the treatment. There was no fever because the Cushing's syndrome suppressed her immune system and Cameron's dosing her with antibiotics to prove her theory also suppressed symptoms that would've shown earlier. Anica is treated for her infection and accepts out-patient treatment for her Münchausen's. Earlier in the episode Cuddy offers Foreman the job of being head of diagnostics permanently, but when he decides to take the offer she refuses, because House's actions convinced her that keeping House in the job is the best thing to do, angering Foreman.

The episode ends with dual scenes of Anica getting admitted to another hospital due to a low white cell count — the side-effect of Colchicine — while House was simultaneously placing bets on races at Off-track betting.

== Reception ==
The episode received 14.52 million viewers.
