= Rachel Roy =

American fashion designer

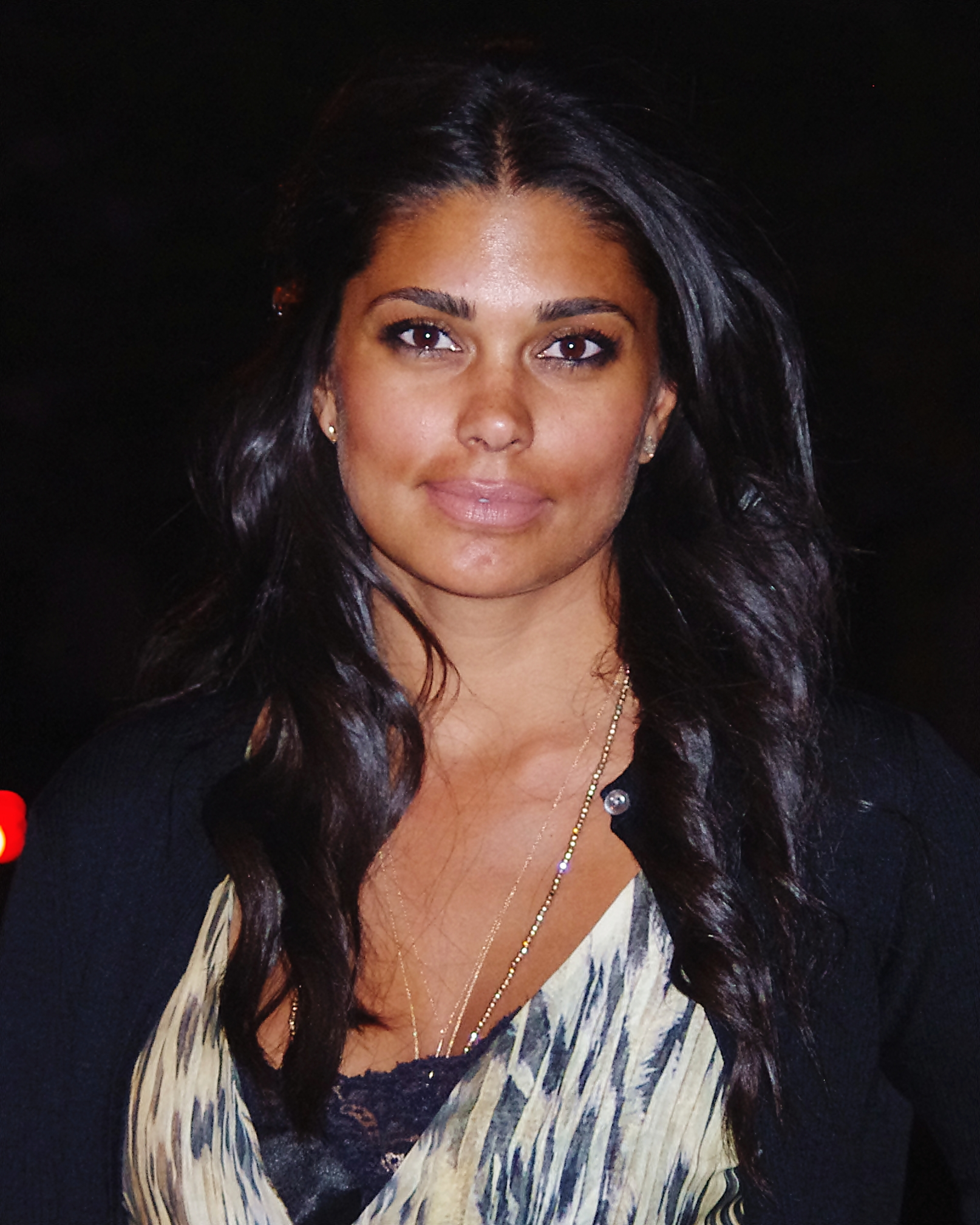
- Roy in 2012
- Born: Rachel Irene Roy; 15 January 1974 (age 52); San Bernardino County, California, U.S.
- Education: Washington Adventist University
- Occupation: Fashion designer
- Spouse: Damon Dash (m. 2005; div. 2009)
- Children: 2
- Website: rachelroy.com

Rachel Irene Roy (born 1974) is an American fashion designer.

== Early life and education ==
Roy was born in San Bernardino County, California, and raised in Seaside, California, as a member of the Seventh-day Adventist Church. She graduated from Seaside High School. Her brother Rajendra Roy is the chief film curator of the Museum of Modern Art in New York. Roy's mother is Dutch and her father is Bengali Indian. Roy attended Columbia Union College (now called Washington Adventist University) in Takoma Park, Maryland and left to move to New York City where she worked as a wardrobe stylist and interned at the fashion label Rocawear.

== Career ==
At Rocawear, she rose to the position of creative director of the women's and children's divisions and met her future husband, Damon Dash. In 2004, Roy launched her eponymous fashion collection.

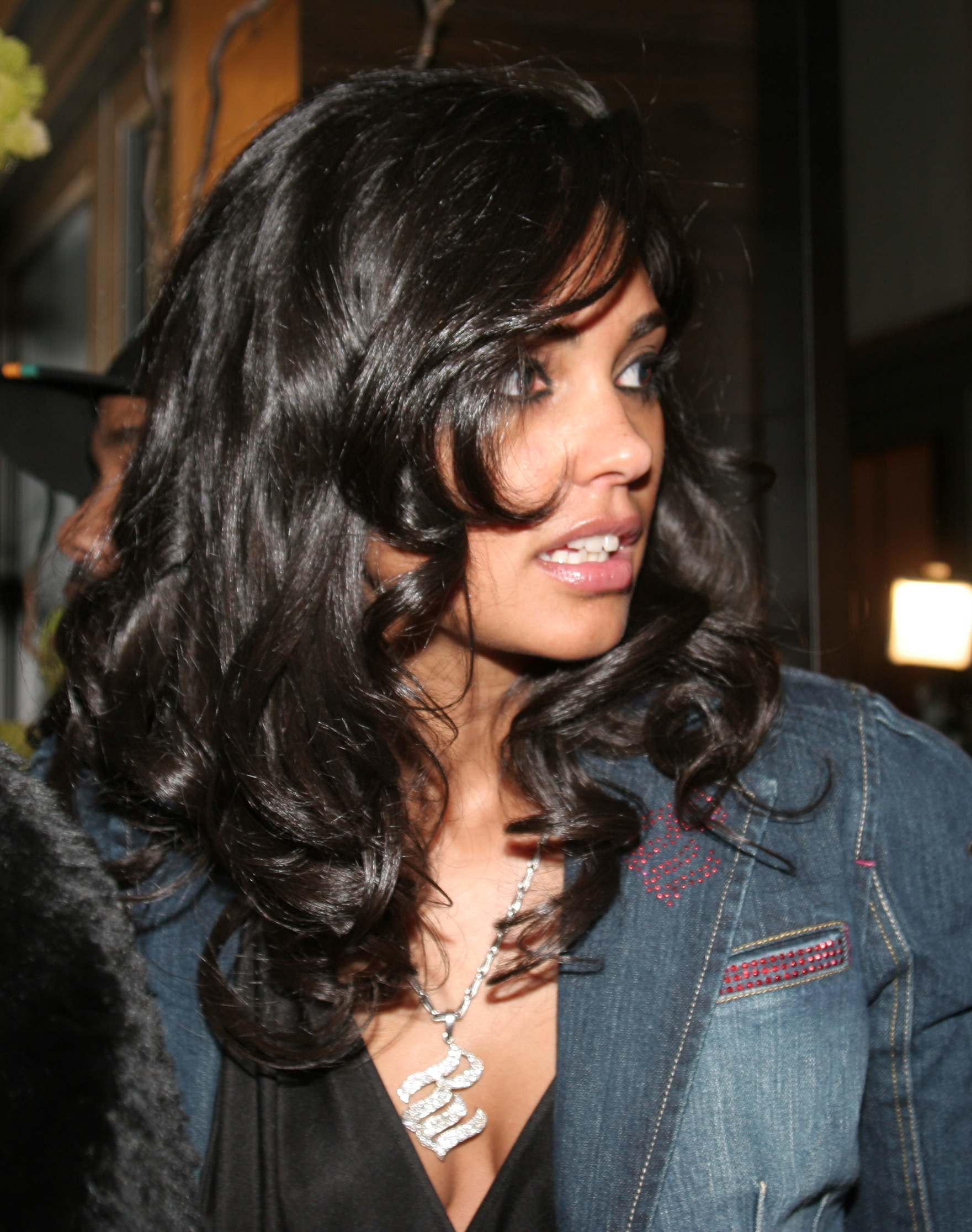
Roy in February 2005

In early 2006, Roy received a Bollywood industry award for her contribution to American fashion. In 2007, Roy was inducted into the Council of Fashion Designers of America. In June 2008, Jones Apparel Group formed a joint venture with the Rachel Roy brand. However, in 2013, Jones decided to sell itself to another company and to liquidate the Rachel Roy brand. They also planned to sell her trademarks to another firm. Roy fought back and sued Jones Apparel. The judge agreed that she held 100% creative control of her company and could decide on the buyer. The suit was settled and eventually sold to Sycamore Partners. As of 2021, her fashion company, Royale Etenia LLC., operates in partnership with Topson Downs. Royale owns 36% of the company and Dash and Roy maintain a 50-50 ownership of Royale.

Roy also received publicity in the teen market, including in Teen Vogue; in its April 2009 issue, Rachel did a "how to", where she transforms a regular T-shirt into an edgy prom dress.

In August 2009, Roy launched The RACHEL Rachel Roy collection, an affordable diffusion line of sportswear, shoes, and accessories. The label "RACHEL Rachel Roy" is available exclusively at Macy’s in the United States and at The Bay in Canada. Also in summer 2009, Roy and Grammy Award-winning British pop singer Estelle announced via Roy’s Twitter feed their collaboration on a jewelry line for the Spring 2010 RACHEL Rachel Roy collection. Roy designed a capsule collection in partnership with model Jessica Stam for Macy's stores and RachelRoy.com in Fall 2010. Roy has received many honors for her efforts as a designer, including an ACE AWARD in November 2010. She is an advisor to World of Children, a national non-profit organization that serves underprivileged kids.

In 2018, she was named a UN Women Champion for Innovation, and rewarded for her work with the UN to advocate for gender equality and bring awareness to related issues. Roy is also an author. In 2015, she wrote her first book, Design your Life. 96 Words for Love, which she cowrote with daughter Ava, was published in 2019.

=== Celebrity clients ===
Clients include Michelle Obama, Diane Sawyer, Kate Hudson, Jennifer Garner, Kim Kardashian, Iman, Lucy Liu, Sharon Stone, Tyra Banks, Wendy Williams, Penélope Cruz, and Melania Trump.

== Personal life ==
Rachel Roy divorced her first husband Yinka Dare, before his death from cardiac arrhythmia in 2004. Rachel and Damon Dash married in late 2004, or in 2005, and have two daughters. She filed for divorce in 2009. In April 2015, Roy was awarded sole custody of both daughters; she filed for an order of protection against Dash. The court granted Roy and her daughters a three-year restraining order against Dash. Days later, Dash filed a lawsuit against her, alleging breach of fiduciary duties and other claims related to Royale Etenia, a fashion company they founded during their marriage.

== See also ==
- Indians in the New York City metropolitan area
