= Hunting (House) =

- House episode
- Episode no.: Season 2 Episode 7
- Directed by: Gloria Muzio
- Written by: Liz Friedman
- Original air date: November 22, 2005

Guest appearances
- Sela Ward as Stacy Warner; Currie Graham as Mark Warner; Matthew John Armstrong as Kalvin Ryan; Wings Hauser as Michael Ryan

Episode chronology
← Previous "Spin"	Next → "The Mistake"
- House season 2

"Hunting" is the seventh episode of the second season of House, and twenty-ninth overall. It premiered on Fox on November 22, 2005, and was written by Liz Friedman and directed by Gloria Muzio. House is confronted by a homosexual man who demands treatment when other doctors diagnose him with AIDS, something he admits he does have. House begins making moves on Stacy using sensitive information on her relationship with Mark.

== Plot ==
Wilson picks up House while they discuss House's theft of Stacy's treatment notes. Wilson is not pleased, particularly when he finds out Stacy and Mark are not having sex despite his recovered status. As they head out they run into a "stalker", Kalvin Ryan, who wants House to treat him. House quickly concludes his health problems stem from AIDS, but Kalvin claims that tests show that AIDS is not causing the new symptoms. After a brief struggle, Kalvin passes out into anaphylactic shock.

Cuddy insists House meets with Stacy in case Kalvin files a lawsuit, and they spar at Stacy's house as she reveals she saw a rat in her house. They share a moment before Mark interrupts, clearly upset. House accepts the case but is bored until they figure out Kalvin is showing all the signs of fighting back against the AIDS but is still getting worse. House suspects the strength of Kalvin's immune system fighting back is causing his new symptoms, and orders more tests. House then prepares to kill Stacy's rat so he can get her to reveal his feelings and get her fired, but notices its odd behavior.

While Kalvin flirts with Chase, House and Stacy head up to Stacy's attic to find the rat and share another moment, but they're interrupted by the staff calling him and updating him. House quickly prescribes some treatments but is more concerned with killing the rat he just spotted. Kalvin's tox screen shows recreational drugs and it's clear he's not too concerned with maintaining his health. He starts to cough and then bleed, spewing blood into Cameron's face.

Cameron is given treatment for the possibility of HIV while House considers the new symptom, a ruptured blood vessel in the lung. Cameron comes in, clearly determined to keep on working, and gives her theory that Kalvin's rec drugs are contaminated. While she and Chase go off to check Kalvin's apartment, House runs the rat's odd behavior past Foreman to get a diagnosis. Cameron mentions that legal might check her out for HIV testing and treatment and accuse her of using drugs to get out of paying her bills. They also find Kalvin's photos of broken 1930s fluorescents that contained beryllium, which can inflame the lungs and inhibit breathing. House orders Cameron to get a lung biopsy from Kalvin. Kalvin reveals to her that he brought his drugs in to the hospital and insists she should show some reaction rather than sympathize with him.

Back at Stacy's, House breaks in and when Stacy shows up, informs her that the rat has a tumor that might be caused by something in the house. When Mark calls, House takes off, but not before putting up the toilet seat to make Stacy believe that Mark left it up, one of Stacy's pet peeves that House learned from her psych file.

Kalvin goes into respiratory distress as he supposedly bleeds into his pericardial space, and asks them to tell his father he's sorry. They find nothing in the cavity and Foreman believes he has a tumor on the heart. CT confirms his diagnosis but Cameron believes it may be a non-lethal mass and House lets her conduct the test to confirm. He also wonders why Kalvin would be apologizing to his father, when his father threw Kalvin out. As Cameron conducts her test and reveals she hid his drugs, Kalvin suggests that HIV might actually loosen her up since she no longer has to play by the rules.

House heads off to Stacy's to confirm that she has not told Mark that House is with her, and the two of them wait for the rat to come out to take the antibiotics in the bait. He reveals the rat's urine shows signs that someone in the house is smoking – Stacy has been doing it secretly and started two weeks after House's surgery. They share yet another moment over her misery over his pain and how she caused his pain, and they start to consider a kiss when the rat sets off the trap.

Chase goes to visit Cameron, who grabs him and starts kissing him. She's clearly high on Kalvin's drugs and the two have sex. The next day Cameron shows up for work as House arrives with his rat (nicknamed "Steve McQueen") and quickly figures out she was using. They end up at Kalvin's room to find his father Michael has arrived and they're having a fight. House pokes away at why Kalvin apologized until Michael reveals Kalvin killed his mother.

The staff check over the new information – Kalvin lied and his mother died because she needed a kidney and he was the only donor, but had HIV. It soon becomes clear to everyone Cameron and Chase slept together, and the tests show that Kalvin has terminal cancer with no chance of a cure, and they prepare to pinpoint its location with a biopsy. Chase helps Cameron with her symptoms and admits they might have a problem with their continuing relationship.

House and Wilson discuss the rat, which is on two weeks of antibiotics, and House remembers the fact that Kalvin's dad was sweating and they're from Montana. House cancels the biopsy and concludes Kalvin's illness is caused by Echinococcosis, a parasite native to Montana that infests foxes – Kalvin and Michael hunted in Montana. The parasites can stay in a host body for decades, causing cysts, and House has figured Michael has cysts in his liver. A blood test for Michael will confirm House's diagnosis and Michael is upset that Kalvin killed his mother. House aggravates both of them by accusing Kalvin's mother of killing herself. Michael takes a swing at him and then House cold cocks him in the gut, initiating anaphylactic shock and confirming his diagnosis the hard way.

Father and son go into surgery and have the cysts and parasites removed. House is satisfied but Cuddy sends him to see Stacy since the father might sue. Cameron confronts Kalvin over the fact that he is not happy and is trying to self-destruct and take her with him. House meets with Stacy, who gets him ice for his bruise, while he informs her that Mark has to know about her smoking. He accuses her of not sleeping with Mark despite her denials, and she figures out he's certain because he read her file. Everything he's done has been based on the inside info he had, and he accuses her of letting it happen because she wants him around. She says, "Not any more" and kicks him out. Kalvin and Michael have a reunion and son finally apologizes to father as Cameron looks on. Stacy seeks comfort in a happy Mark's arms, Chase notices a cut lip from his encounter with Cameron, and Cameron counts the days until she can take her first HIV test. Finally, House is home alone with the rat.

== Music ==
- "Crystalline Green" by Goldfrapp plays while Cameron is seducing Chase.
- "Colors" by Amos Lee is played during the montage at the end of the episode.

== Reception ==
The episode first aired on November 22, 2005, and averaged 14.72 million viewers.
