= ITGB1BP1 =

Protein-coding gene in the species Homo sapiens

Available structures
PDB	Ortholog search: PDBe RCSB
PDB	List of PDB id codes 4DX8, 4DX9, 4JIF

Identifiers
- Aliases: ITGB1BP1, ICAP-1A, ICAP-1B, ICAP-1alpha, ICAP1, ICAP1A, ICAP1B, integrin subunit beta 1 binding protein 1
- External IDs: OMIM: 607153; MGI: 1306802; HomoloGene: 3496; GeneCards: ITGB1BP1; OMA:ITGB1BP1 - orthologs

Gene location (Human)
Chr.	Chromosome 2 (human)
Band	2p25.1	Start	9,403,475 bp
Band	2p25.1	End	9,423,528 bp

Gene location (Mouse)
Chr.	Chromosome 12 (mouse)
Band	12|12 A1.3	Start	21,290,826 bp
Band	12|12 A1.3	End	21,336,285 bp
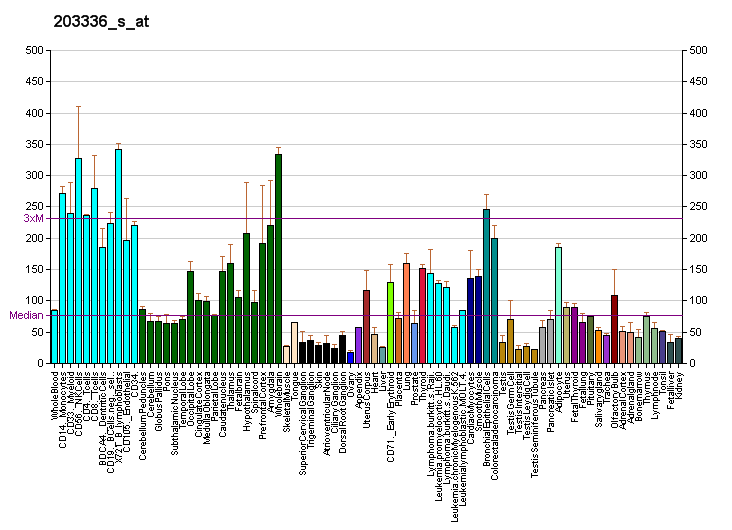

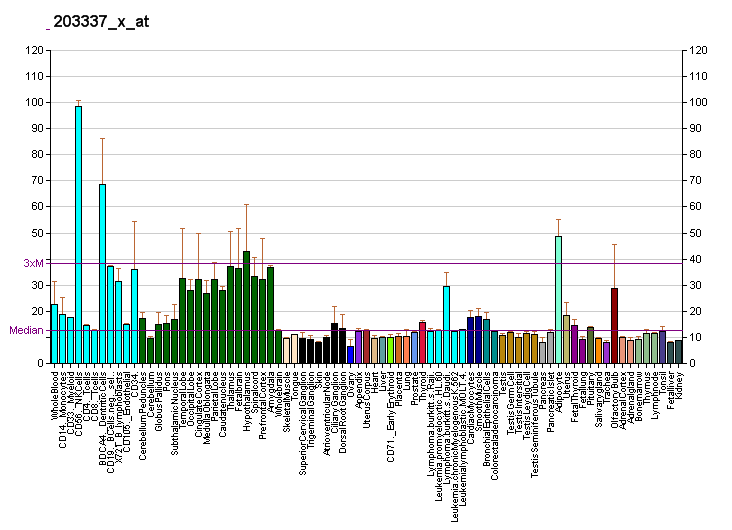
RNA expression pattern
Bgee	Human / Mouse (ortholog); Top expressed in: canal of the cervix; subcutaneous adipose tissue; abdominal fat; tibial nerve; right frontal lobe; caudate nucleus; putamen; gastric mucosa; apex of heart; C1 segment / Top expressed in: seminiferous tubule; spermatid; cerebellar cortex; white adipose tissue; lobe of cerebellum; cerebellar vermis; morula; nucleus accumbens; olfactory tubercle; granulocyte; More reference expression data
BioGPS	More reference expression data
Gene ontology
Molecular function	integrin binding; kinase binding; protein binding; GDP-dissociation inhibitor activity; protein kinase binding; protein-containing complex binding
Cellular component	cytoplasm; cytosol; cell projection; membrane; focal adhesion; ruffle; plasma membrane; perinuclear region of cytoplasm; cytoskeleton; nucleus; lamellipodium; cell periphery; nucleoplasm; microtubule organizing center; nuclear body
Biological process	Notch signaling pathway; positive regulation of protein targeting to membrane; cell differentiation; activation of protein kinase B activity; myoblast migration; negative regulation of fibroblast migration; regulation of cell adhesion mediated by integrin; intracellular signal transduction; positive regulation of protein kinase B signaling; regulation of transcription, DNA-templated; negative regulation of protein kinase activity; regulation of GTPase activity; biomineral tissue development; negative regulation of protein binding; cellular response to fibroblast growth factor stimulus; receptor clustering; blood vessel endothelial cell proliferation involved in sprouting angiogenesis; transcription, DNA-templated; positive regulation of endothelial cell migration; negative regulation of cell adhesion involved in substrate-bound cell migration; negative regulation of cell migration involved in sprouting angiogenesis; negative regulation of protein targeting to membrane; tube formation; regulation of integrin-mediated signaling pathway; cell adhesion; angiogenesis; positive regulation of cell population proliferation; protein transport; integrin-mediated signaling pathway; negative regulation of ERK1 and ERK2 cascade; positive regulation of focal adhesion assembly; cellular response to vascular endothelial growth factor stimulus; integrin activation; cell-matrix adhesion; negative regulation of substrate adhesion-dependent cell spreading; cell migration; negative regulation of focal adhesion assembly; positive regulation of cell division; positive regulation of stress fiber assembly; positive regulation of Notch signaling pathway; negative regulation of cell population proliferation; positive regulation of transcription by RNA polymerase II; protein localization to plasma membrane
Sources:Amigo / QuickGO
Orthologs
Species	Human	Mouse
Entrez	9270	16413
Ensembl	ENSG00000119185	ENSMUSG00000062352
UniProt	O14713	O35671
RefSeq (mRNA)	NM_004763; NM_022334; NM_001319066; NM_001319067; NM_001319068 NM_001319069; NM_001319070; NM_001369744; NM_001369745; NM_001369746; NM_001369747; NM_001369748; NM_001369749; NM_001369750	NM_008403; NM_001355609
RefSeq (protein)	NP_001305995; NP_001305996; NP_001305997; NP_001305998; NP_001305999 NP_004754; NP_071729; NP_001356673; NP_001356674; NP_001356675; NP_001356676; NP_001356677; NP_001356678; NP_001356679	NP_032429; NP_001342538
Location (UCSC)	Chr 2: 9.4 – 9.42 Mb	Chr 12: 21.29 – 21.34 Mb
PubMed search
- Wikidata
View/Edit Human	View/Edit Mouse

Integrin beta-1-binding protein 1 is a protein that in humans is encoded by the ITGB1BP1 gene.

The cytoplasmic domains of integrins are essential for cell adhesion. The protein encoded by this gene binds to the beta1 integrin cytoplasmic domain. The interaction between this protein and beta1 integrin is highly specific. Two isoforms of this protein are derived from alternatively spliced transcripts. The shorter form of this protein does not interact with the beta1 integrin cytoplasmic domain. The longer form is a phosphoprotein and the extent of its phosphorylation is regulated by the cell-matrix interaction, suggesting an important role of this protein during integrin-dependent cell adhesion.

== Interactions ==
ITGB1BP1 has been shown to interact with KRIT1, LRP2, CD29 and LRP1.
