= Developmental venous anomaly =

- Other names: Venous angioma
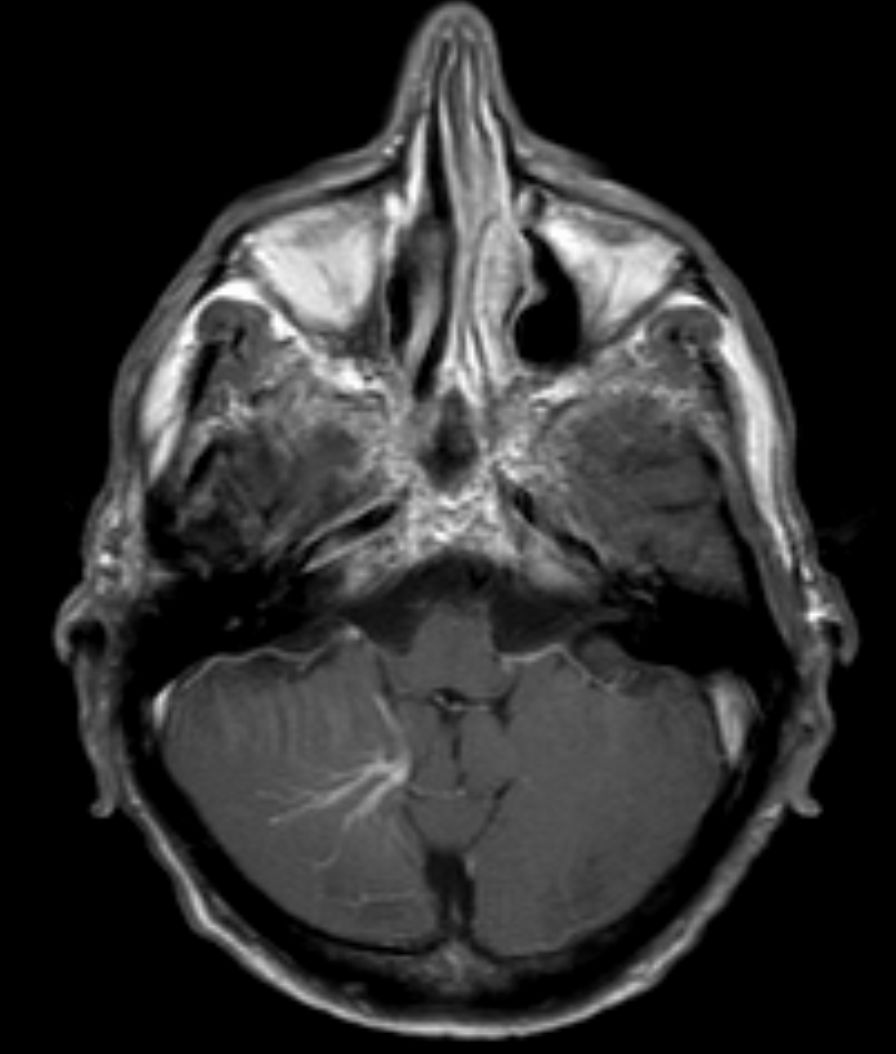
- Developmental venous anomaly in the cerebellum seen on axial contrast-enhanced T1 weighted MRI

A developmental venous anomaly (DVA, formerly known as venous angioma) is a congenital variant of the cerebral venous drainage. On imaging it is seen as a number of small deep parenchymal veins converging toward a larger collecting vein.

== Characteristics ==
DVA can be characterized by the caput medusae sign of veins, which drains into a larger vein. The drains will either drain into a dural venous sinus or into a deep ependymal vein. It appears to look like a palm tree.

== Location ==
Most common locations for the DVA:

Location	Percent of DVA	Notes
Frontoparietal morphoea	36–64%	Drains towards the frontal horn of the lateral ventricles.
Cerebellar hemisphere	14–27%	Drains into the fourth ventricle.

== Diagnosis ==
DVA can be diagnosed through the cerebral venous sinus thrombosis with collateral drainage. DVA can also be found diagnosed with Sturge–Weber syndrome and can be found through leptomeningeal angiomatosis. Demyelinating disease has also been found to enlarge medulla veins.
