= House vs. God =

- House episode
- Episode no.: Season 2 Episode 19
- Directed by: John F. Showalter
- Written by: Doris Egan
- Original air date: April 25, 2006

Guest appearances
- Thomas Dekker as Boyd; William Katt as Walter; Tamara Braun as Grace Palmieri

Episode chronology
← Previous "Sleeping Dogs Lie"	Next → "Euphoria (Part 1)"
- House season 2

"House vs. God" is the nineteenth episode of the second season of House, which premiered on the Fox network on April 25, 2006.

== Plot ==
Boyd, a young faith healer, is giving a service in a church and "heals" a woman, allowing her to walk. However, when Boyd is leading the congregation in song, he has spasms and collapses.

When House shows up at work, Wilson approaches him and voices his displeasure of not being invited to House's weekly poker game. Meanwhile, Cameron and Foreman are administering tests when Boyd claims to talk to God about Cameron's feud with Foreman. Cameron and Foreman are shocked, but House is skeptical of every claim of divinity. The tests show low sodium and diluted urine. However, when House goes to talk to Boyd, he notices that he has been drinking water from a previously opened bottle, refilled several times an hour.

House meets with Wilson and discusses his patient while Wilson is meeting with a cancer patient named Grace Palmieri. However, Boyd suddenly wakes up and starts wandering the halls, singing Go Tell It on the Mountain. Boyd sees Palmieri, senses that she is sick, and lays his hands on her, performing a "healing." Palmieri is shocked, but Chase catches up with Boyd and takes him back to his room. House and his team are discussing Boyd's symptoms when Wilson barges in and tells the group that Palmieri feels better than before, and House suspects that Boyd is talking to Palmieri.

House notices an abnormal growth called Tuberous Sclerosis, and claims that it is what is causing all of Boyd's symptoms. Boyd consents to the tubular sclerosis tests after talking to Wilson. Boyd, who seems to have a strange omniscient mind, convinces House to invite Wilson to his poker game. Wilson visits House at home and informs him that Palmieri's tumor has actually shrunk.

House orders Chase to search Palmieri's house while House, Wilson, and some unnamed people are playing poker. Chase finds clothes that would suggest that Palmieri has a boyfriend, and gets very concerned after he hears noises outside the door. Via phone, House assures Chase that the boyfriend will not come home, while glaring at Wilson across the poker table. House reasoned that Boyd must have learned of the poker game from Palmieri, and Palmieri from Wilson. House then accuses Wilson of having slept with Palmieri and moved in with her. Wilson, after demanding House tell the rest of the poker party that his name is not Wilson, storms out. They have a short, angry conversation outside.

Back at the hospital, Boyd begins to run a fever. House concludes that the Tuberous Sclerosis cannot be causing this, and that a lumbar puncture is needed. However, Boyd refuses any more of "man's medicine", preferring to leave his life "in God's hands." House believes that Boyd has a herpes virus that was acquired through sex, and transmitted to Palmieri when he touched her. Boyd refuses to strip to reveal a rash on his lower back until his father, putting faith in medicine where "teenage boys" are concerned, tells him to do so. The rash is discovered, confirming the scenario that the herpes virus attacked Palmieri's tumor, making it go into temporary remission.
