= Matthew John Armstrong =

American actor

- Born: August 28, 1973 (age 52); Chicago, Illinois, U.S.
- Occupation: Actor
- Spouse: Ashley Crow
- Children: Pete Crow-Armstrong

Matthew John Armstrong (born August 28, 1973) is an American actor. He is known for roles in Turks (1999), The Profile (2010) and Heroes (2006).

== Early life ==
Armstrong attended Naperville Central High School in Naperville, Illinois, where he played football and was the two-time Defensive Player of the Year in the DuPage Valley Conference. Armstrong was listed as Linebacker on the 1990 Tribune All-State football team. On May 4, 2012, he was recognized as a notable Naperville Central Alumni.

== Career ==
Armstrong appeared in 1999 on the short-lived police drama Turks. He had a recurring role on American Dreams from 2002 to 2005. He portrayed an AIDS patient in an episode of House in 2005. From 2006 to 2007, he appeared on the television series Heroes as Ted Sprague. In 2011, he portrayed a phoenix in an episode of Supernatural. In 2012, he appeared in the second season of American Horror Story.

=== Cavemen mixup ===
Armstrong reportedly has been mistaken for one of the actors who portray cavemen in a popular series of commercials for the automobile insurance provider GEICO, due to his hairstyle and facial hair resembling the makeup used for the caveman characters. Armstrong noted this misconception in an interview with Entertainment Weekly stating, "For the record, I am not the GEICO caveman."

== Personal life ==
He is married to actress Ashley Crow. He has one son, professional baseball player Pete Crow-Armstrong.
