= Nesidioblastoma =

Type of pancreatic tumor

In medicine, a nesidioblastoma is an uncommon, insulin-secreting, pancreatic neuroendocrine tumor (PanNET). The term dates to at least 1938. In that report, these lesions were adjudicated as histologically benign adenoma growths, that were associated with severe, long-standing hypoglycemia due to hyperinsulinism. Surgical removal corrected the low glucose problems. There is no rigorous definitional separation from insulinoma, other than the original emphasis that was placed on the observed precise histological recapitulation of normal islet cell structure within the adenomas, which lacked microscopic features of aggressivity.

The functional hypoglycemia seen with these lesions is also a feature of nesidioblastosis, in which, however, a more diffuse hyperplasia of the pancreatic beta cells is found, often with an abnormal microscopic appearance.

== See also ==
- Neuroendocrine tumor
