= CCM2 =

Protein-coding gene in humans

Identifiers
- Aliases: CCM2, C7orf22, OSM, PP10187, CCM2 scaffolding protein, CCM2 scaffold protein
- External IDs: OMIM: 607929; MGI: 2384924; GeneCards: CCM2
Available structures
PDB	Ortholog search: PDBe RCSB
PDB	List of PDB id codes 4FQN, 4TVQ, 4WJ7, 4Y5O, 4YKC, 4YKD, 4YL6

Gene location (Human)
Chr.	Chromosome 7 (human)
Band	7p13	Start	44,999,475 bp
Band	7p13	End	45,076,469 bp

Gene location (Mouse)
Chr.	Chromosome 11 (mouse)
Band	11|11 A1	Start	6,496,887 bp
Band	11|11 A1	End	6,546,744 bp
RNA expression pattern
Bgee	Human / Mouse (ortholog); Top expressed in: putamen; nucleus accumbens; cingulate gyrus; anterior cingulate cortex; caudate nucleus; granulocyte; right frontal lobe; prefrontal cortex; Brodmann area 9; amygdala / Top expressed in: mesenteric lymph nodes; olfactory tubercle; otic vesicle; medial geniculate nucleus; barrel cortex; Rostral migratory stream; thymus; otic placode; granulocyte; fossa; More reference expression data
BioGPS	n/a
Gene ontology
Molecular function	protein binding
Cellular component	cytoplasm; mitochondrion; protein-containing complex
Biological process	vasculogenesis; integrin-mediated signaling pathway; inner ear development; endothelial tube morphogenesis; multicellular organism development; development of the heart; cell-cell junction organization; blood vessel endothelial cell differentiation; blood vessel development; vasculature development; in utero embryonic development; stress-activated MAPK cascade; endothelial cell development; venous blood vessel morphogenesis; multicellular organism growth; pericardium development
Sources:Amigo / QuickGO
Orthologs
Databases	NCBI: entry; OMA: entry
Species	Human	Mouse
Entrez	83605	216527
Ensembl	ENSG00000136280	ENSMUSG00000000378
UniProt	Q9BSQ5	Q8K2Y9
RefSeq (mRNA)	NM_001029835; NM_001167934; NM_001167935; NM_031443; NM_001363458 NM_001363459	NM_001190343; NM_001190344; NM_146014
RefSeq (protein)	NP_001025006; NP_001161406; NP_001161407; NP_113631; NP_001350387 NP_001350388	NP_001177272; NP_001177273; NP_666126
Location (UCSC)	Chr 7: 45 – 45.08 Mb	Chr 11: 6.5 – 6.55 Mb
PubMed search
- Wikidata
View/Edit Human	View/Edit Mouse

Malcavernin is a protein that in humans is encoded by the CCM2 gene.

== Gene ==
The CCM2 gene contains 10 coding exons and an alternatively spliced exon 1B. This gene is located on chromosome 7p13.

== Function ==
The function of malcavernin is to act as a scaffold for a variety of signaling complexes including p38 MAP Kinase. This protein is also involved in regulating the cellular localization of the KRIT1 protein and acts with the Rho Kinase signaling pathway to maintain normal blood vessel structure.

== Clinical significance ==
Loss of function mutations on CCM2 lead to the onset of cerebral cavernous malformations (CCM) illness. Cerebral cavernous malformations (CCMs) are vascular malformations in the brain and spinal cord made of dilated capillary vessels.
