= Jessica Stam =

Canadian model (born 1986)

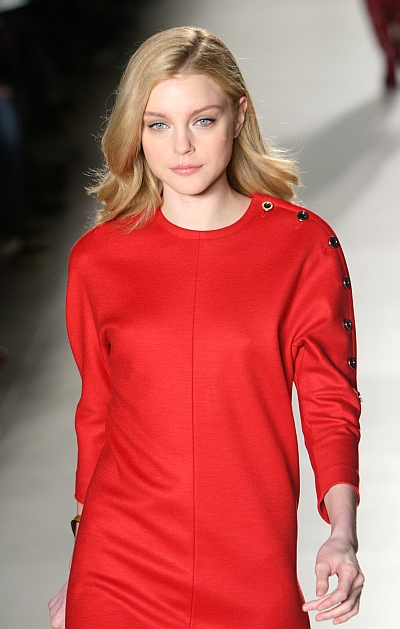
- Stam for Tommy Hilfiger in February 2008
- Born: Jessica Elizabeth Stam; 23 April 1986 (age 40); Kincardine, Ontario, Canada
- Occupation: Model
- Years active: 2002–present
- Children: 2
- Modeling information
- Height: 5 ft 10 1/2 in (1.79 m)
- Hair color: Blonde
- Eye color: Blue-grey
- Agency: IMG Models (worldwide); View Management (Barcelona); Bravo Models (Tokyo)

Jessica Elizabeth Stam (born 23 April 1986) is a Canadian model. She is considered to be part of the crop of models described as "doll faces." In 2007, Forbes named her fifteenth in the list of the World's 15 Top-Earning Supermodels, earning at an estimated total of $1.5 million in the past 12 months.

== Early life and discovery ==
Stam was born in Kincardine, Ontario, to Rick and Deb Stam, and grew up on a farm alongside her six brothers: Nathan, Aaron, Mathew, Christopher, Justin, and Micah. She came from a religious family and attended Sacred Heart High School in Walkerton, Ontario. Her original intention was to become a dentist. Stam was discovered in a local Tim Hortons coffee shop by Michèle Miller (an agent at the International Model Management agency in Barrie, Ontario) who found Stam on the way back from Canada's Wonderland (a theme park just outside Toronto).

== Career ==
=== Early beginnings 2002–2004 ===
Stam won the Los Angeles Model Look contest in 2002. Photographer Steven Meisel jump-started her career and soon after cast her in every advertisement campaign of his. "I guess I'm his muse", she has said, and she has credited him with helping her become a supermodel. She has appeared on the cover of UK, Turkish & German Vogue and in advertisements for Marc Jacobs, Anna Sui, Giorgio Armani and others.

In 2004, Stam appeared in the short film Agent Orange. She was sued by New York Model Management, because of a breach of contract. Fashion designer Marc Jacobs created The Marc Jacobs Stam, a bag inspired by and named after her.

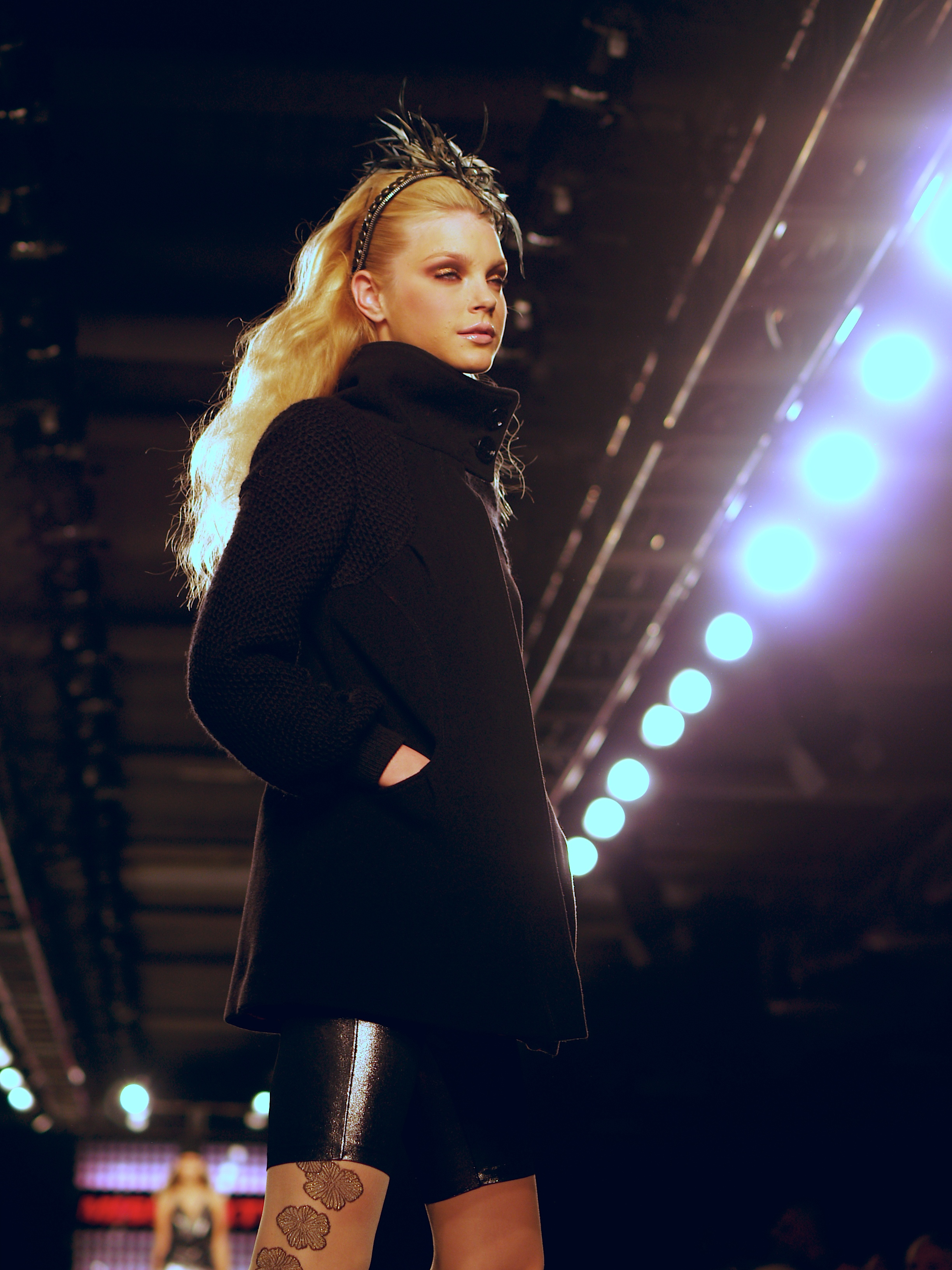
Stam modeling for Miss Sixty, Fall 2007 at New York Fashion Week

=== Modelling breakthrough 2006–2009 ===
Stam walked a total of 64 shows combined during the New York, Milan, and Paris Fashion Weeks in 2006. In January 2006, she appeared in the Rochas ad campaign, shot and directed by Bruno Aveillan. Stam fell at the Chloé Fall 2006 show in Paris, while wearing "ridiculously high patent-leather pumps" that got caught on each other as her feet crossed on the runway. Her fall received millions of views on YouTube and took first spot on the "Top Five Runway Falls" list by New York Magazine. For the Victoria's Secret Fashion Show in 2006, she opened the first "Pink" segment ever. Her appearance also included a featurette showing a Victoria's Secret commercial shoot and what a model sees when walking the runway.

She was presented, along with nine other models, on the May 2007 cover of American Vogue as one of the "World's Next Top Models." During Paris's Spring/Summer 2007 Haute Couture fashion week, she walked for Chanel, Christian Lacroix, Christian Dior, Givenchy, and Jean Paul Gaultier. In July 2007, earning an estimated total of $1.5 million in the previous 12 months, Forbes named her fifteenth in the list of the World's 15 Top-Earning Supermodels. Currently, she stars in campaigns for Bulgari, Dior, Lanvin and Escada. She also appeared in the F/W 2007 Christian Dior, DKNY, Miss Sixty, Loewe and Roberto Cavalli ad campaign. She has also walked in the 2006, 2007, and 2010 Victoria's Secret fashion shows. For F/W 08, Stam could be seen in ads for Giorgio Armani's "Onde" fragrance, Dolce & Gabbana and Bulgari. The Wall Street Journal featured Jessica Stam in their article on "How to Walk Like a Model" and taught a DKNY intern her runway moves.

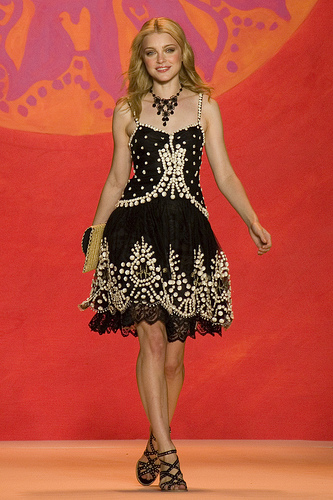
Stam at the Anna Sui Show 2009

=== Continued success 2009–present ===
She returned as the face of Bulgari, and in March 2009 she appeared on the cover of Tokyo Numéro. She starred in the fall Fendi campaign, shot by Karl Lagerfeld. She starred in Nina Ricci's new floral fragrance named Ricci Ricci for summer 2009. Stam guest starred in Season 1, episode 4 of CW's The Beautiful Life.

She was chosen to model the Nina Ricci spring 2010 campaign. Stam has transitioned from modeling into designing, first collaborating with Rag & Bone on pieces for the spring 2010 collection, and then signing up with Rachel Roy to co-design a capsule collection consisting of jeans, a bag, and a cardigan for her Rachel Rachel Roy label, launch in October 2011. Stam modeled for Victoria's Secret Giles Deacon's show in Paris. She appeared on the inaugural cover of Vogue Turkey, launched March 2010. Stam designed and modeled four pieces for Rachel Roy's lower-priced line, RACHEL Rachel Roy, which launched August 2010 at Macy's.

In 2011, Stam was named the face of CoverGirl, teaming up with makeup artist Pat McGrath for the brand's new Lip Perfection campaign.

Stam is placed on a list of "Industry Icons" by models.com, "Icons" being defined as models having "at least 8+ years at blue chip level under their belts" and "still currently working". Stam hosts Yahoo!'s fashion show The Thread, and the Marc Jacobs pre-show. In 2012 Stam partnered with Many Hopes and Adopt Together to help foster kids in the US and street kids in coastal Kenya. On 30 May 2013, Stam represented Peacejam as an "ambassador" at the 2013 Social Innovation Summit held at The United Nations Plaza.

== Personal life ==
Stam has dated DJ AM. In 2017, she gave birth to a baby girl. In July 2020, she confirmed via a post on her Instagram page that she was expecting her second child.
