= Cerebral cavernous malformation =

Region with a lack of blood flow due to vein malformation

Cavernous hemangioma
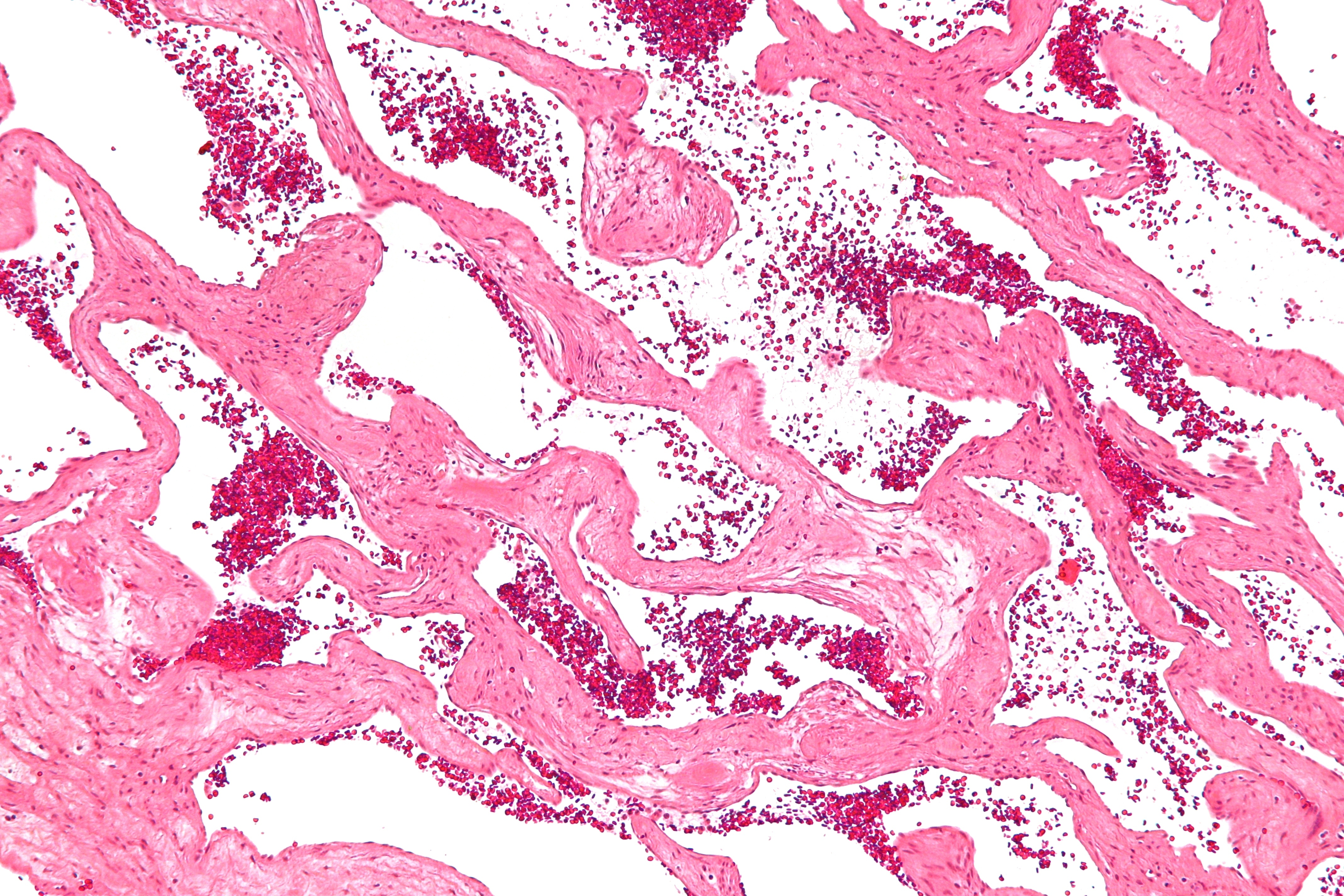
- Micrograph of a cavernous liver hemangioma. H&E stain.
- Specialty: Oncology, hematology, cardiology, neurosurgery

Cerebral Cavernous Malformation, or CCM (also called cavernous angioma, or cavernoma), is a type of rare capillary or venous malformation that forms due to genetic mutations in endothelial cells. Despite its designation as an angioma, cerebral cavernous malformations are benign (but not harmless), not malignant. In CCM abnormal blood vessels can form in the brain, spinal cord, retina or skin. These vessels take on a characteristic raspberry-like shape, which causes a slowing of blood flow through the cavities, or "caverns." In these abnormal blood vessels, the endothelial cells do not form the necessary junctions with surrounding cells causing leakage of blood into the surrounding tissue. The leakage of blood (hemorrhage) is what causes a variety of symptoms associated with the condition.

== Epidemiology ==
Cerebral cavernous malformations can appear at any age, but usually occur in the third to fourth decade of the life of a person of either sex. 25% of cases of CCM occur in children. Cerebral cavernous malformations are present in 0.5% of the population. However, only approximately 20% of people with malformations will have symptoms. Symptomatic cases of CCM are classified as either sporadic or familial; these classes account for approximately 80% and 20% of symptomatic CCM, respectively. Familial CCM is inherited in an autosomal dominant fashion and is marked by the formation of multiple lesions, whereas sporadic cases usually only develop a single malformation. The presence of founder mutations in a population can increase the local incidence of familial cases. For example, the presence of a founder mutation in the Hispanic population of the Southwest, increases the percentage of familial disease there to ~50%.

== Causes ==
Genetic studies show that specific gene mutations or deletions cause CCM. Loss of function mutations of one of three genes: K-Rev interaction trapped 1 (KRIT1, also known as ССМ1), CCM2 (also known as malcavernin) or programmed cell death protein 10 (also known as ССМ3) are the major drivers of CCM formation. These genes are located at 7q21.2 (chromosome 7 long arm), 7p13 (chromosome 7 short arm) and 3q25.2-q27 (chromosome 3 long arm) respectively. Furthermore, it is also believed that a "second hit mutation" is necessary for the onset of the disease. This means that having a mutation in one of the two copies (alleles) of a gene present in a cell is not enough to cause the cavernous malformation, but mutation of both alleles would cause the malformation. Familial patients would be pre-disposed to forming malformations due to their inherited mutation, but lesion formation would require a new somatic mutation of the second allele. Radiation treatment used for other medical conditions has been shown to cause cavernous malformation in some patients. In addition up to 70% of symptomatic CCM tissues carry activating mutations in the gene PIK3CA, an oncogene frequently up-regulated in cancer which drives rapid proliferation of endothelial cells in the lesion.

== Presentation & Symptoms ==
People with this condition may or may not experience symptoms. When symptoms do occur, they are typically linked to recent bleeding from an active lesion, and symptoms can vary due to the location of this lesion. Common symptoms include focal seizures (50%), stroke (25%), and focal neurologic deficits (25%). Less serious symptoms may include headaches and weakness or numbness in the arms or legs, though these symptoms alone do not indicate a person has the condition.

=== Diagnosis ===
Patients are usually diagnosed with CCM after an MRI, where the lesions present with a characteristic 'popcorn' appearance. Doctors may run multiple types of MRI scans (T2-weighted, T1-weighted, or SWI sequences) in order to get more information about bleeding activity, size, and number of lesions in a patient. Many asymptomatic CCMs are incidentally identified on MRIs performed for other reasons.

== Mechanism ==
There are several known causes for cavernous hemangiomas, but some cases are still unknown. Radiation treatment used for other medical conditions has been suggested to cause cavernous malformation in some patients. Hemangioma tumors are a result of rapid proliferation of endothelial cells and pericytic hyperplasia, or the enlargement of tissue as a result of abnormal cell division pericytes. The pathogenesis of hemangioma is still not understood. It has been suggested that growth factors and hormonal influences contribute to the abnormal cell proliferation. Cavernous liver hemangiomas are more commonly diagnosed in women who have been pregnant. As a result of this, it is believed that estrogen levels may play a role in the incidence of liver cavernomas.

Genetic studies show that specific gene mutations or deletions are causes for the disease. The genes identified for cerebral cavernous hemangiomas (or malformations), are CCM1 (also KRIT1), CCM2 (also MGC4607, malcavernin) and CCM3 (also PDCD10). The loss of function of these genes is believed to be responsible for cerebral cavernous malformations. Furthermore, it is also believed that a "second hit mutation" is necessary for the onset of the disease. This means that having a mutation in one of the two genes present on a chromosome is not enough to cause the cavernous malformation, but mutation of both alleles would cause the malformation. Additionally, research on hemangiomas in general has shown that loss of heterozygosity is common in tissue where hemangioma develops. This would confirm that more than a single allele mutation is needed for the abnormal cell proliferation. KRIT1 has been shown to act as a transcription factor in the development of arterial blood vessels in mice. CCM2 has overlapping structure with CCM1 (KRIT1) and acts as a scaffolding protein when expressed. Both genes are involved with MAP3K3 and thus appear to be a part of the same pathway.

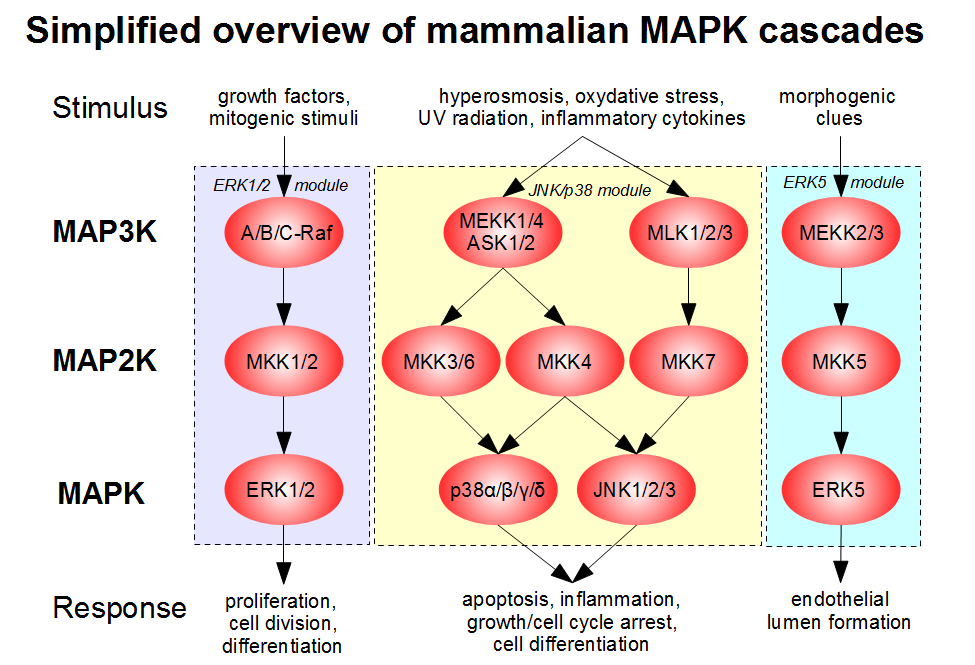
A simplified overview of mammalian MAPK pathways

CCM2 has been shown to cause embryonic death in mice. Lastly, the CCM3 gene has been shown to have similar expression to CCM1 and CCM2, suggesting a link in its functionality. As of 2009 no experiments have determined its exact function. The lack of function of these genes in control of a proliferative signaling pathway would result in uncontrolled proliferation and the development of a tumor. In 2018, it was theorized that proliferation of endothelial cells with dysfunctional tight junctions, that are under increased endothelial stress from elevated venous pressure provides the pathophysiological basis for cavernous hemangioma development.

In 2017 a team demonstrated that negative regulation of MAP3K3 (MEKK3), KLF2, and KLF4 are implicated in the pathogenesis of CCM. Additionally, they identified endothelial Toll-like receptor 4 (TLR4) and it's relationship with the gut microbiome as a driving factor in CCM formation.

== Treatment ==
Asymptomatic lesions may not require treatment but may need to be monitored for any change in size. A change in size of lesions in the nose, lips, or eyelids can be treated with steroid drugs to slow progress. Steroids can be taken orally or injected directly into the tumor. Applying pressure to the tumor can also be used to minimize swelling at the site of the hemangioma. A procedure that uses small particles to close off the blood supply, known as sclerotherapy, promotes tumor shrinkage and pain reduction; however, it is possible for the tumor to regrow its blood supply after this procedure. If the lesion caused by the cavernous hemangioma is destroying healthy tissue around it, or if the patient is experiencing major symptoms, surgery can be used to remove the cavernoma piecemeal. A common complication of the surgery is hemorrhage and the loss of blood. The hemangioma may also recur after its removal. Stroke or death is a possible risk.

Treatments for cerebral cavernous hemangiomas include radiosurgery or microsurgery. The treatment approach depends on the site, size and symptoms present, as well as the history of hemorrhage from the lesion. Microsurgery is generally preferred if the cerebral cavernous hemangioma is superficial in the central nervous system, or the risk of damage to surrounding tissue from irradiation is too high. A large hemorrhage with deterioration of the patient, or intractable symptoms (such as seizures or coma), are further indications for microsurgical intervention. Gamma-knife radiation is the favored mechanism of radiosurgery; it provides a precise radiation dose to the cerebral cavernous hemangioma while relatively sparing the surrounding tissue. There has been limited research on using these treatment approaches for cavernous hemangiomas in other regions of the body.

=== Prognosis ===
A few studies have worked on providing details related to the outlook of disease progression. Two studies show that each year 0.5% of people who had never had bleeding from their brain cavernoma, but had symptoms of seizures, were affected by bleeding. In contrast, patients who have had bleeding from their brain cavernoma in the past had a higher risk of being affected by subsequent bleeding. The statistics for this are very broad, ranging from 4% to 23% a year. Some additional studies suggest that women and patients under the age of 40 are at higher risk of bleeding, but similar conducted studies did not reach the same conclusion. However, when cavernous hemangiomas are completely excised, there is very little risk of growth or rebleeding. Not enough data has been collected on life expentancy of patients with this malformation to provide a representative statistical analysis.

== Research ==
For the treatment of cavernous hemangioma in the brain, neurosurgery is typically chosen. Research needs to be conducted on the efficacy of treatment using stereotactic radiation therapy, especially for the long-term. Radiotherapy is being studied as a form of treatment if neurosurgery is too dangerous due to the position of the cavernoma. Genetic researchers are still working on finding the cause of the illness and the mechanism behind blood vessel formation. Clinical trials are being conducted to better assess when, and what treatments are needed. Long-term studies are also being conducted because the long-term outlook for patients with cavernoma is unknown. A registry known as The International Cavernous Angioma Patient Registry collects information from patients diagnosed with cavernoma in order to facilitate discovery of non-invasive treatments.
