= KRIT1 =

Gene of the species Homo sapiens

Identifiers
- Aliases: KRIT1, ankyrin repeat containing, CAM, CCM1
- External IDs: OMIM: 604214; MGI: 1930618; GeneCards: KRIT1
Available structures
PDB	Ortholog search: C9JD81 PDBe C9JD81 RCSB
PDB	List of PDB id codes 3U7D, 4DX8, 4DXA, 4HDO, 4HDQ, 4JIF, 4TKN, 5D68

Gene location (Mouse)
Chr.	Chromosome 5 (mouse)
Band	5 A1|5 2.26 cM	Start	3,853,184 bp
Band	5 A1|5 2.26 cM	End	3,895,564 bp
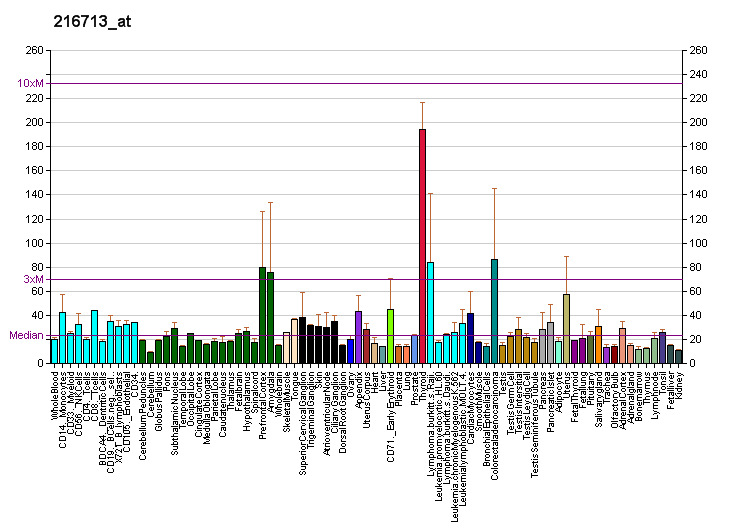
RNA expression pattern
Bgee	Human / Mouse (ortholog); n/a / Top expressed in: Rostral migratory stream; interventricular septum; mammillary body; lateral septal nucleus; dorsomedial hypothalamic nucleus; anterior amygdaloid area; tail of embryo; spermatocyte; lateral hypothalamus; genital tubercle
BioGPS	More reference expression data
Gene ontology
Molecular function	microtubule binding; protein binding; phosphatidylinositol-4,5-bisphosphate binding; protein-containing complex binding; GTPase regulator activity
Cellular component	cytoskeleton; membrane; microtubule; plasma membrane; cytoplasm; cell-cell junction; cell junction; extracellular space
Biological process	regulation of establishment of cell polarity; negative regulation of angiogenesis; small GTPase mediated signal transduction; angiogenesis; negative regulation of endothelial cell proliferation; negative regulation of endothelial cell apoptotic process; negative regulation of endothelial cell migration; positive regulation of protein binding; cell redox homeostasis; regulation of catalytic activity
Sources:Amigo / QuickGO
Orthologs
Databases	NCBI: entry; OMA: entry
Species	Human	Mouse
Entrez	889	79264
Ensembl	ENSG00000001631	ENSMUSG00000000600
UniProt	O00522	Q6S5J6
RefSeq (mRNA)	NM_001013406; NM_004912; NM_194454; NM_194455; NM_194456	NM_001170552; NM_030675
RefSeq (protein)	NP_001013424; NP_004903; NP_919436; NP_919437; NP_919438 NP_001337598; NP_001337599; NP_001337600; NP_001337601; NP_001337602; NP_001337603; NP_001337604; NP_001337605; NP_001337606; NP_001337607; NP_001337608; NP_001337609; NP_001337610; NP_001337611; NP_001337612; NP_001337613; NP_001337614; NP_001337615; NP_001337616; NP_001337617; NP_001337618; NP_001337619; NP_001337620; NP_001337621; NP_001337622; NP_001337623; NP_001337624; NP_001337625; NP_001337626	NP_001164023; NP_109600
Location (UCSC)	n/a	Chr 5: 3.85 – 3.9 Mb
PubMed search
- Wikidata
View/Edit Human	View/Edit Mouse

Krev interaction trapped 1 or Cerebral cavernous malformations 1 is a protein that in humans is encoded by the KRIT1 gene. This gene contains 16 coding exons and is located on chromosome 7q21.2. Loss of function mutations in KRIT1 result in the onset of cerebral cavernous malformation. Cerebral cavernous malformations (CCMs) are vascular malformations in the brain and spinal cord made of dilated capillary vessels.

== Interactions ==
The KRIT1 protein, is 736 amino acids in length and has a variety of functions. KRIT1 has been shown to interact with multiple signaling pathways including; ITGB1BP1., reactive oxygen species, cell death, and angiogenesis. Related to cerebral cavernous malformations, this protein is required for maintaining the structural integrity of the vasculature.
