= Failure to Communicate =

2006 episode of House

- House episode
- Episode no.: Season 2 Episode 10
- Directed by: Jace Alexander
- Written by: Doris Egan
- Original air date: January 10, 2006

Guest appearances
- Sela Ward as Stacy Warner; Mimi Kennedy as Greta Sims; Erica Gimpel as Elizabeth Stone; Bruce French as Peter Foster; Michael O'Keefe as Fletcher Stone

Episode chronology
| ← Previous "Deception" | Next → "Need to Know" |
- House season 2

"Failure to Communicate" is the tenth episode of the second season of House, which premiered on Fox on January 10, 2006.

== Plot ==
Reporter Fletcher Stone collapses and hits his head on a desk. He wakes up moments later suffering from Schizophasia, and is later diagnosed with both aphasia and dysgraphia, although it is clear that he believes he is speaking and writing normally.

House is in Baltimore with Stacy, justifying Medicaid billings. Snow delays House's flight and Stacy turns up at the airport. There is an announcement that all flights are grounded and Stacy reveals she booked a hotel room just in case because she knew the storm was coming; she tells House they can share because of his leg.

Meanwhile, at the hospital the tests show drug use although Fletcher claimed he was clean. Fletcher takes sleeping pills, a fact he wants to keep from his wife. Chase and Foreman find diet pills at Fletcher's office and then head to his home to collect more information, but they do not find any more drugs.

In the hotel room, Stacy admits she misses House, and they begin to kiss but are interrupted by House's phone. The staff tries to decode Fletcher's statements with House over the phone, trying to draw patterns to what he's saying. Cameron concludes that it's Elizabeth's presence that makes Fletcher reluctant to answer truthfully. House figures out that when Fletcher is talking about a bear, he is talking about a polar bear – leading to the conclusion that Fletcher is bipolar and has been using sleeping pills at night and amphetamines during the day.

House is being pressured by an airport security guard to board the plane but continues talking on the phone. He concludes that Fletcher covered up his disorder while he is a journalist but tried to change for his wife, and underwent secret surgery (bilateral cingulotomy). While House delivers his diagnosis, Elizabeth overhears the news and leaves. House recommends they test the blood again visually to confirm the diagnosis – cerebral malaria. Foreman is shocked and upset because if anyone had actually looked at the blood and not just run it through a computer, Fletcher would've been diagnosed instantly. House talks to Stacy as she boards the plane and says he hopes she can get him off the No Fly List.
