= Christopher Carley =

American actor

- Born: Christopher Murphy Carley; May 31, 1978 (age 48); Suffern, New York, U.S
- Other name: Chris Carley
- Occupation: Actor

Christopher Murphy Carley (born May 31, 1978) is an American actor who is sometimes credited as Chris Carley. He is best known for portraying Father Janovich in the 2008 film Gran Torino.

== Biography ==
Carley was born in Suffern, New York to Elizabeth and Gerard Carley and grew up in Pearl River. He has two sisters, Cara and Sarah, and graduated from Pearl River High School in 1996. He later studied at the New York University Tisch School of the Arts, receiving acting training at both the Atlantic Theater Company Acting School and the Experimental Theatre Wing.

Carley made his acting debut on Broadway in the 1998 production of The Beauty Queen of Leenane taking over the role of Ray. He also played "Second Bellboy" in Once in a Lifetime.

He has appeared in such television series as House M.D., Law & Order: Special Victims Unit, The Sopranos, and Veronica Mars. He also played a small role in the film Lions for Lambs. In 2008 he starred with Clint Eastwood in the film Gran Torino.

== Filmography ==
Year	Title	Role	Notes
1997	Colin Fitz Lives!	Lonely Fan	
2003	Main Road		
2004	Garden State	Gleason Party Drunk	
2005	Backseat	Guy at Party	
2005	Homecoming	Tony	
2007	Lions for Lambs	Sniper	
2008	AmericanEast	Guy in coffee shop #2	
2008	Gran Torino	Father Janovich	
2010	Miss Nobody	Frankie Sheftell	
