= Allison Cameron =

Fictional character on the Fox medical drama House

- House character
- Jennifer Morrison as Dr. Allison Cameron in House
- First appearance: "Pilot" (1.01) 2004
- Last appearance: "Everybody Dies" (8.22)
- Created by: David Shore
- Portrayed by: Jennifer Morrison

In-universe information
- Nickname: Cameron
- Gender: Female
- Occupation: Physician; Immunologist: Department of Diagnostic Medicine Fellow (seasons 1–3); Interim Department of Diagnostic Medicine Fellow (season 6); Senior Attending Emergency Room (season 4–5); Interim Dean of Medicine (episode 5.13)
- Family: Unnamed brother
- Spouses: Unnamed first husband (widowed); Robert Chase (divorced); Unnamed third husband
- Children: 1
- Religion: Deism
- Home: Princeton, New Jersey; Chicago, Illinois (1980–2004, current)

Allison Cameron, M.D., is a fictional character on the medical drama House, portrayed by American actress Jennifer Morrison. An immunologist, Cameron is a member of Dr. Gregory House's team of handpicked specialists at Princeton–Plainsboro Teaching Hospital's Department of Diagnostic Medicine. She returns for the final episode of the series, "Everybody Dies". She is a Senior Attending Physician and board-certified in Internal Medicine and Immunology as seen on a computer in Season 1.

== Personality ==
"You live under the delusion that you can fix everything that isn't perfect. That's why you married a man who was dying of cancer. You don't love, you need. And now that your husband is dead, you're looking for your new charity case. That's why you're going out with me. I'm twice your age, I'm not great looking, I'm not charming, I'm not even nice. What I am is what you need. I'm damaged."

— House to Cameron on their date in "Love Hurts" (Season 1)

At the start of the show, Cameron is the only woman on House's initial diagnostic team. She is known for her honesty, sincerity, idealism and strong ethical center. Even so, she is not out of her depth teasing others, as she does when alone with Chase, telling him that women can have hour-long orgasms (in response to Foreman telling her Chase is interested but shy); but, when Foreman enters, she acts completely deadpan. She is a deist, claiming "I believe in a higher order that's in control of what happens, but not in one anthropomorphic entity called 'God' that's concerned with the everyday workings of you and me", but expresses a feeling of respect for people with religious beliefs, unlike House, who openly taunts religious people. Joyce Millman of The New York Times has stated she plays "Jane Eyre to House's Edward Rochester." Millman stated that House's description of Cameron in "Love Hurts" (see box on the right) "[...] cut to the core of Cameron's motivation and personality". Morrison said that Cameron hates herself for being in love with House, "but she can't help but find him desirable". Cameron objects to House's reliance on deceiving their patients and goes head-to-head with him several times on the issue. She is also reluctant to deliver bad news to patients or their families.

Cameron's interest in House subsides even before she begins her relationship with Chase, although it does seem to resurface occasionally. In the season 4 episode "Ugly", Cameron absent-mindedly mentions to a documentary team that she loves House, although she immediately clarifies that she meant she loved working for House. In "No More Mr. Nice Guy", when House is believed to have neurosyphilis, Chase asks her directly in front of Foreman and the other fellows if she has slept with House, to which she angrily replies, "It's none of your business. It's none of their business." Chase thinks she did; however, later, when they are in private, she says she did not. In season 4, Cameron dyes her hair blonde. Early in season 4, House, who was told by Dr. James Wilson (Robert Sean Leonard) and Dr. Lisa Cuddy (Lisa Edelstein) that Cameron and Chase moved to Arizona, finds her in the ER after finally discovering that they are still working at the hospital. House tells her that she is an "idiot". When Cameron asks if it was either the hair or where she is working, he says where she is working, stating that her hair makes her look like a hooker and that he likes it.

In the season 5 episode "Big Baby," Cameron temporarily moves up to Acting Dean of Medicine and Hospital Administrator, after Cuddy decides to spend more time being a mother. However, she soon quits, stating that she can never say no to House after studying under him for three years.

In season 6, Cameron leaves PPTH and divorces Chase after finding out about the events that took place in the episode "The Tyrant". Her last episode as a main character is "Teamwork", the 8th episode of the season. She leaves when she realizes that House has a heavy impact on Chase and she can't live with it, after her failed attempt to make Chase quit the hospital as well.

She later appears in the season 6 episode, "Lockdown", to get Chase to sign their divorce papers and after having done so, the two of them end on good terms, talking about their fondest memories of each other and making love in the clinic. This is her last appearance in the show until her cameo in the series finale.

== Reception ==
Maureen Ryan of the Chicago Tribune reported that many fans were disappointed the character received less airtime in season 4. David Shore and producer Katie Jacobs stated that Chase and Cameron would be getting sufficient screentime and storylines soon throughout the series when many of the show's fans complained and took action.

== Departure ==
Fox Broadcasting announced in September 2009 that Cameron would be written out of the series in the middle of season 6.

Before her final episode aired on November 16, 2009, Morrison commented on the announcement of her departure, stating that it was not definite. "I don't think anyone really knows...they're always just a couple of episodes ahead, and [executive producer] David Shore has always been very true to the writing of the characters and what he believes them to be." Morrison says that Shore is currently trying to figure out the truth of where Cameron's supposed to be right now, and "if she fits into the hospital...and as far as I know, they don't know. So that's what I know," Morrison said at the Star Trek home video premiere party. Cameron returned in the season 6 episode, "Lockdown" as well as in the series finale, "Everybody Dies", as a hallucination. Cameron was also present at House's funeral, telling everyone that "somewhere... he knew how to love."
