= Nurse Jeffrey =

- Genre: Comedy; Drama
- Starring: Patrick Price; Lisa Edelstein
- Country of origin: United States
- Original language: English
- No. of seasons: 1
- No. of episodes: 13

Original release
- Network: iTunes
- Release: May 24 – August 16, 2010

Related
- House

Nurse Jeffrey is a miniseries that is a spin-off from the American medical drama series House. The series focuses around the eponymous character Jeffrey Sparkman, a minor character who appeared in only three episodes of House; two episodes in season 6 in order to launch Nurse Jeffrey three weeks after the second (May 3, 2010) appearance, and one of many cameos by past actors in the May 2012 series finale, "Everybody Dies".

The first and only season of Nurse Jeffrey features thirteen episodes (or "appisodes"), each about three minutes in length. The episodes were initially only accessible as part of the inHouse app from iTunes, for the iPhone, iPad and iPod Touch devices. They were later made available on the Fox Broadcasting Company's website and Hulu. Price, and the Sparkman character, only appeared one other time on House.

== Background ==
Nurse Jeffrey, played by Patrick Price, is one of the few male nurses at Princeton-Plainsboro Hospital, the primary location of House. He had been featured in the sixth-season episode "Ignorance Is Bliss", where he is subjected to taunts by Dr. Gregory House about the fact that he is a male in a profession dominated by women in the US.

== Plot ==
The episodes take the form of a video blog with Jeffrey speaking to the camera about his plan to bring about the demise of Dr. House. In his "Bitch Tape", Jeffrey locates members of staff at Princeton-Plainsboro Hospital whom he believes have information about illicit activities in which Dr. House may have been involved. Most of the characters featured in the show are minor characters in House, however Lisa Edelstein appears as Lisa Cuddy in the final episode.

== Cast and characters ==
- Patrick Price as Nurse Jeffrey (recurring)
- Lisa Edelstein as Lisa Cuddy (1 episode)

== Distribution ==
Nurse Jeffrey became available May 24, 2010, as a feature of the new House application, inHouse, exclusively available for the iPhone, iPad and iPod Touch. A new appisode became available for download weekly for 13 weeks. On August 16, 2010, all appisodes became available on the official Fox website for streaming. All appisodes are available for viewing on Hulu.
