= Everybody Dies (House) =

2012 final episode of House, M.D.

- House episode
- Episode no.: Season 8 Episode 22
- Directed by: David Shore
- Written by: David Shore; Peter Blake; Eli Attie
- Original air date: May 21, 2012
- Running time: 44 minutes

Guest appearances
- James LeGros as Oliver; Karolina Wydra as Dominika Petrova; Jennifer Crystal Foley as Rachel Taub; Zena Grey as Ruby; Patrick Price as Nurse Jeffrey Sparkman; Diane Baker as Blythe House; Andre Braugher as Dr. Darryl Nolan; Anne Dudek as Dr. Amber Volakis; Jennifer Morrison as Dr. Allison Cameron; Kal Penn as Dr. Lawrence Kutner; Amber Tamblyn as Dr. Martha M. Masters; Sela Ward as Stacy Warner

Episode chronology
← Previous "Holding On"	Next → —
- House season 8

"Everybody Dies" is the series finale of the American medical drama television series House, and aired on Fox in the United States on May 21, 2012. It is the 22nd episode of the eighth season and the 177th overall episode of the series. In the episode, House is forced to examine his life and future while treating a drug-addicted patient. The title references the series' first episode, "Everybody Lies", a phrase that also serves as House's mantra.

The episode aired immediately following "Swan Song", an hour-long retrospective episode. It featured cameos from multiple characters from previous seasons, including Remy "Thirteen" Hadley, Allison Cameron, Martha Masters, Dominika Petrova, and Stacy Warner, as well as Lawrence Kutner and Amber Volakis, who both died in previous seasons but appeared as hallucinations. The episode was watched by 8.72 million viewers in the U.S. and received mixed critical reception; E! Online and Entertainment Weekly praised its writing and acting, while The A.V. Club was more critical of its plot and writing.

== Plot ==
After waking up next to a dead body in an abandoned building that is slowly burning down, House starts to hallucinate about his former and deceased colleagues and realizes he is arguing with his own subconscious about whether he should try to escape or die in the fire. Flashbacks show that he took up the case of Oliver, a heroin addict, in the days prior to waking up in the abandoned building. Oliver overheard that House would be facing felony vandalism charges (Note: As depicted in "Holding On".) and had offered to take the blame for him as he believed he was about to die anyway, but House realized that Oliver would likely live. In the present, House recognizes the dead body as Oliver.

Meanwhile, Wilson and Foreman have not seen House for several days. After talking to House's therapist, they suspect that House is using heroin with Oliver. They track down Oliver's address and see a burning building nearby; a moment after they notice that House is trapped inside, the building explodes and collapses. Using dental records, a coroner confirms that a burnt corpse pulled from the wreckage of the building is that of House.

A funeral is held for House. Most people call House a positive force in their lives, but Wilson—knowing that he himself only has a few months left to live due to his terminal cancer diagnosis—instead tells the harsh truth, delivering a eulogy in which he calls House an arrogant man who never cared for his friends. He is interrupted by a text message from an unknown number that reads "SHUT UP YOU IDIOT" and leaves the funeral, finding House waiting at his home. House admits he switched his dental records with Oliver in order to fake his own death, stunning Wilson, who states that House just destroyed his own life and will go to jail in addition to being unable to ever practice medicine again. Reminding Wilson that he is legally dead, House asks him how he would like to spend his final months of life.

A montage shows the fates of the main characters: Chase replaces House as Head of Diagnostic Medicine, with Adams and Park working under him; Taub enjoys a meal at a restaurant with his wife Rachel and his former mistress Ruby, having patched things up with both to allow him to spend time with his daughters; Cameron, having returned to her career in medicine as the head of the emergency room at a hospital in Chicago, gazes at a photo of the old team before leaving to join her husband and child; Foreman discovers House's hospital ID being used to stabilize a wobbly table leg in his old office, about which he had previously complained, recognizing this as House's way of letting him know that he is actually alive; and House and Wilson prepare to set off on a cross-country motorbike trip, with Wilson asking what House should do when the cancer gets worse, but House tells him that "cancer's boring" before the two ride away.

== Production ==
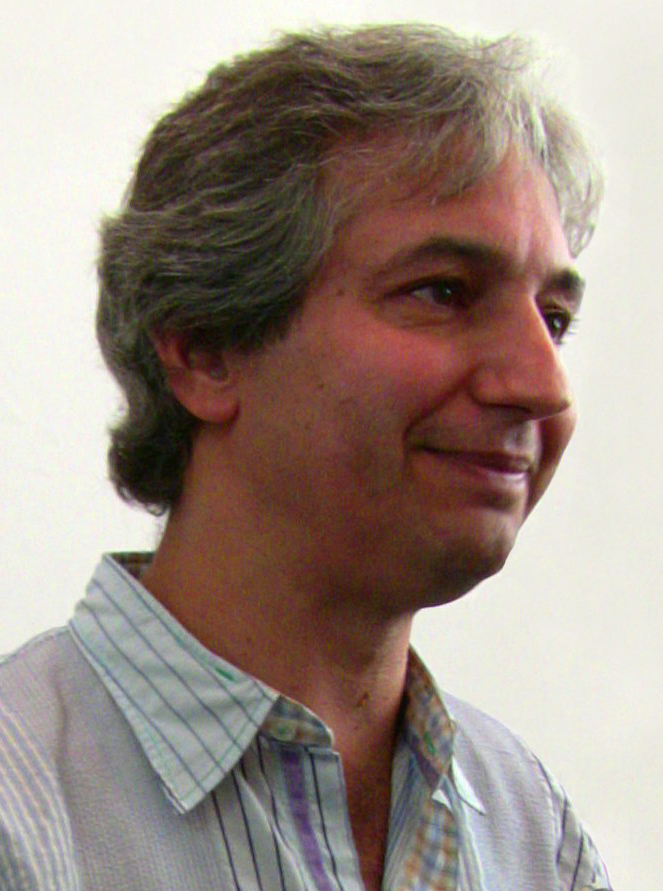
Director and series creator David Shore

In March 2012, Amber Tamblyn was confirmed to reprise her role as Martha Masters for the finale. Anne Dudek, Sela Ward, and Andre Braugher also reprised their previous roles as Amber, Stacy Warner, and Dr. Nolan respectively. In April, it was announced that David Shore would direct and co-write the final episode of the show and that Olivia Wilde would return as Thirteen for the penultimate episode and the series finale. It was also reported Kal Penn would return as Dr. Kutner and Jennifer Morrison would return to the series in a cameo appearance as Dr. Cameron. Lisa Edelstein, who played Dr. Lisa Cuddy in the first seven seasons, did not return for the series finale.

Many endings were considered for the finale of the series. The writers had considered killing House at one point, but settled for an ending where Wilson got sick, though the storyline was decided on at the beginning of the season. The episode also mirrors the Sherlock Holmes story "The Final Problem" where Holmes fakes his death. Laurie suggested the song "Enjoy Yourself (It's Later than You Think)" for the final scene. In interviews after the episode aired, Shore said that the fire was caused by Oliver falling asleep while smoking, and House had managed to escape the building in the few seconds between the collapse and the explosion. Chase has a minimal role in the finale, since the writers wanted to focus on the relationship between House and Wilson.

Shore told Entertainment Weekly that the series finale is "a different kind of episode, but at its core I think it's still a House episode... I really wanted to make sure that we're doing that at the end and we're still happy. As Hugh Laurie says, Dr. House is the guy who leaves the party before people want him to." Other cast members agreed that it was time for the show to end; Omar Epps, who played Eric Foreman, said: "You want to go out at a time when the show is still effective, people are still watching it, the stories are still fresh... I think we've run our course. It's the right time."

The title of the episode, "Everybody Dies", is a reference to the title of the pilot episode, "Everybody Lies", a line commonly said by House.

== Broadcast ==
The episode aired on May 21, 2012, immediately following a one-hour retrospective episode, "Swan Song". The finale drew in an audience of 8.72 million in the US, finishing first on its hour and third on the night. Its 18-49 rating was 2.9, which was tied for second place on the night. In the US, "Everybody Dies" finished eighth in the week for adults 18–49 and finished eleventh overall. In Canada, the series finale finished third in the weekly viewership with 2.13 million viewers. In the United Kingdom, the episode had 688,000 viewers upon airing.

== Reception ==
The episode received mixed critical reception. Some critics felt the episode was a fitting ending giving proper closure to the series. Lisa Palmer of TV Fanatic gave the finale an excellent rating of 4.8/5 and stated that "I feel satisfaction at this ending ... I can move on from this show without hesitation", similar to Morgan Jeffery of Digital Spy, who stated "'Everybody Dies' probably won't go down in TV history as one of the great series finales, but it does get a hell of a lot right. House gets his happy ending with Wilson and, perhaps more importantly, there's the implication that he'll be okay once his friend is gone." Ken Tucker of Entertainment Weekly wrote that "House had, in its final seasons, become a rather sentimental show" and the final episode was a "satisfying" and "fitting ending".

Some critics were less positive. Zack Handlen of The A.V. Club awarded the episode a D+ rating, stating: "'Everybody Dies' is a failure of ambition." Handlen also criticized the direction the show had been going in over the last seasons, writing that "then at some point, the soul floated away, and the writers were forced to push harder and harder to make us feel anything at all." Similar sentiments were shared by Vulture's Margaret Lyons who wrote: "More than a hospital drama or a character piece or anything else, House is a complex meditation on misery, but there is a line between 'enlightened cynicism' and 'misery-entropy'. As the show wore on, its dramatic flare dimmed while its agony flare burned ever brighter." She concluded that "it's hard not to wish that the show was going out on more of a high note, rather than the middle-range note it's been playing, and playing, and playing, for years."

Jenna Mullins of E! Online wrote: "Yep, House faked his own death to avoid prison and spend time with his best friend before he died. Sure, most people think he's dead now (except Foreman, who got a little reminder in the form of House's Princeton badge), but what matters is that the last shot was House and Wilson, riding motorcycles down a tree lined road into the sunset." She concluded: "Shore promised us the finale would be introspective for House, and he was totally right. A fitting end to a wonderful series, don't you think?" Entertainment Weekly ranked House faking his death at number three for "Single Most Clever Twist" for the 2012 TV Season Finale Awards.
