= James Wilson (House) =

Fictional character on House

James Wilson, M.D.
- House character
- First appearance: "Pilot" (1.01)
- Last appearance: "Everybody Dies" (8.22)
- Portrayed by: Robert Sean Leonard

In-universe information
- Full name: James Evan Wilson
- Gender: Male
- Occupation: Head of the Department of Oncology
- Family: Danny Wilson (brother)
- Spouses: Dr. Sam Carr (ex-wife); Bonnie (ex-wife); Julie (ex-wife)

James Evan Wilson, M.D., is a fictional character on the medical drama House. He is played by Robert Sean Leonard. The character first appears in the show's pilot episode when he introduces a medical case to the protagonist, Dr. Gregory House. Wilson is Dr. House's only true friend; Wilson frequently provides House with consultations and aid. Wilson is the head of the Department of Oncology at Princeton-Plainsboro Teaching Hospital.

During the show's run, the characters of House and Wilson have been compared to Sherlock Holmes and Dr. Watson. Wilson's portrayer, Robert Sean Leonard, has stated that his character and Dr. House were originally supposed to play these roles, but that Dr. House's diagnostic team has taken over Dr. Watson's part. Leonard also read the script of the pilot episode of CBS' Numb3rs and planned to audition. He auditioned for Wilson instead because he felt he would more enjoy playing the character that House went to for help and because he liked the Odd Couple dynamic of the relationship.

The character was positively received. Alan Sepinwall of The Star-Ledger described Wilson as "the only irreplaceable supporting character" of the show.

== Character biography ==
Wilson is one of three brothers. He has an undergraduate degree from McGill University, and graduate degrees from Columbia University and the University of Pennsylvania. He played tennis for his college team. He is Jewish, celebrates Christmas in addition to Hanukkah, and sometimes refers to Christian history, philosophy, and practices, as well as secular self-actualization advice.

During a medical convention in New Orleans, shortly after graduating medical school, Wilson accidentally broke an antique mirror and started a bar fight when another customer repeatedly played "Leave a Tender Moment Alone" by Billy Joel; Wilson was going through a divorce with his first wife at the time. House met him in jail and, motivated by a desire for companionship and by sheer boredom, bailed him out and hired an attorney to clear his name, thus starting their professional and personal relationship. In the Season 1 episode "Histories", it is revealed that one of his brothers is homeless and that Wilson is unaware if he is still alive as he has not seen him in nine years. Wilson has a history of failed marriages: he is married to his third wife during Season 1 and, with the discovery of his wife's infidelity, separates from her during Season 2. After the failure of his third marriage, Wilson lives in various temporary accommodations (including a stint at House's own apartment) until he meets Amber Volakis, who is a female substitute for House. He is described as "nearly 40" in "Don't Ever Change", in Season 4, and by the end of Season 8, House describes him during a semi-mock DDx as a "46-year-old oncologist". Wilson and House's relationship has been sorely tested on many occasions.

He is diagnosed with stage II thymoma in the Season 8 episode "Body and Soul" and given six months to live. In the series finale, at House's funeral, Wilson gives an honest description of House as opposed to everyone's kind words and gets a text message telling him to "Shut up, you idiot." To his shock, Wilson discovers House alive and well, having faked his death in order to spend Wilson's final months with him (House was facing a return to prison), and House asks Wilson how he wants to spend his last five months. Some time later, Wilson and House are seen in the countryside on motorcycles. He asks House about what they will do when the cancer gets bad, but House simply tells him that "cancer is boring" and they ride off together.

== Characterization ==
House describes Wilson as "a buddy of mine people say 'Thank you' to when he tells them they are dying." House also describes Wilson as an "emotional vampire". On a date with Dr. Lisa Cuddy (Lisa Edelstein), Wilson evades a question as to whether or not he wants children.

However, Wilson defends House when House's career is in jeopardy, after billionaire entrepreneur and then chairman of Princeton-Plainsboro's Board Edward Vogler (Chi McBride) proposes a motion for House's dismissal. Wilson is the only one to vote against the motion. In response, Vogler proposes and succeeds in obtaining Wilson's dismissal, but Wilson is soon reinstated thanks to Cuddy after she convinces the board that Vogler is the real threat to the hospital and his money is not worth his business-obsessed mindset. In a third-season episode, it is revealed that Wilson has clinical depression and takes medication. Wilson is also seen to write with his left hand, a trait he shares with Cuddy and Foreman, but when he performs detailed medical work, such as injections or incisions, or gesticulates while speaking, appears to be right-handed in general, suggesting he may be ambidextrous.

Wilson attempts to change House's drug habits, with little success. After Cuddy makes a bet to prove House is addicted to Vicodin, House concedes to Wilson that he has an addiction but says that the addiction is not a problem. It is, in fact, Wilson who usually writes House's Vicodin prescriptions (with Cuddy writing a few merely for leverage in her dealings with House). In Season 3, when Detective Michael Tritter (David Morse) threatens to jail House for his Vicodin addiction after finding a huge stash in his apartment, Wilson attempts to convince House to go to rehab as the situation worsens. After Tritter pressures Wilson to testify several times, Wilson reluctantly agrees, unknown to House. Before this, Wilson watches House punch Dr. Robert Chase, insult Cuddy, and incorrectly diagnose a child with a condition that would have required the amputation of her left arm and leg.

Near the end of Season 4, Wilson starts a romantic relationship with Amber Volakis, who shares many character traits with House, and who competed for one of the open jobs on House's team in the wake of Foreman, Chase, and Cameron's departure. In the Season 4 finale, she dies after a bus crash sustained while picking up a drunken House from a bar. Her death eventually leads Wilson to conclude that his relationship with House serves to enable House's dysfunctions. To remove himself from House's influence, he resigns from Princeton-Plainsboro at the beginning of Season 5. The two reconcile when Wilson forces House to attend the funeral of House's father. Wilson realizes that he had been afraid of losing House, who is his true friend, and that Wilson's life didn't get any better when he resigned. He then returns to Princeton-Plainsboro.

During Season 5, it is revealed that Wilson's homeless brother Danny suffered from schizophrenia since adolescence, which is what caused him to run away. Wilson blames himself for his brother's homelessness, having hung up on Danny right before he disappeared. Wilson also reveals to House that he took the position at Princeton-Plainsboro because it was near the place he had last seen Danny. When Wilson finds out that Danny is in the Psychiatric Ward of New York Mercy Hospital [fictional], House offers to come with him to keep him company, noting that it could end badly. However, when Wilson is let in to see his brother, House is busy with a differential with his team.

In Season 6, Episode 15, "Private Lives", House discovers that Wilson, in his youth, had been an actor in a porno flick titled "Feral Pleasures". Throughout the episode, after House hangs movie posters all over the hospital, people start paraphrasing a quote by Wilson's character: "Be not afraid. The forest nymphs have taught me how to please a woman". In addition, Wilson proposes a joke marriage to House in "The Down Low".

Gay references have been made to the relationship between the two characters of the show. House jokes about their relationship, stating "I'm gay!...Oh that's not what you meant. It would explain a lot, though: no girlfriend, always with Wilson, the obsession with sneakers..." When Wilson asks House what his recreation plans are, House responds "Masturbating. I'd invite you, but people are already talking". Barbara Barnett said that "House is the needy one in the relationship, and Wilson the doormat". Verne Gay of Newsday described House's love for Wilson as "touching and genuine". However, Robert Sean Leonard compared the relationship between the two to that of Cesar Millan and his Pit Bull, while Hugh Laurie said that it's "not just buddydom". The two characters appeared on the October 13, 2008, cover of TV Guide.

== Concept and creation ==
"I like being on the side, I like kind of being the friend who pokes his head in and says, "How ya doin'? OK," and then goes home".

— Leonard in an interview with BuddyTV.

Robert Sean Leonard was not initially interested in auditioning for the role of James Wilson. He believes that he got the role because of his friendship with Bryan Singer, whom he had met in the past, shortly after he was paid for his role in Dead Poets Society. Singer borrowed money from him to shoot Lion's Den starring his friend Ethan Hawke, who also attended high school with Singer. In 2004, Leonard received the scripts for the pilot of both House and CBS' Numb3rs (in which he was asked to audition for the part of Charlie Eppes). He thought the script for Numb3rs was "kinda cool". However, he decided to audition for the part of Wilson on House, because his character on Numb3rs was in almost every scene of the show.

In the show's parallels with Arthur Conan Doyle's Sherlock Holmes, Wilson is equivalent to Doctor Watson. In two-part episodes such as "Euphoria, Part 1" and "Euphoria, Part 2", and "House's Head" and "Wilson's Heart", Wilson's voice is heard narrating the story, while Dr. Watson is the character who narrates the stories in most of Sherlock Holmes novels. Leonard has said that his character and House were originally intended to play roles similar to Dr. Watson and Sherlock Holmes, respectively, in the series although he believes that House's team has assumed the role of Watson since the show began. Producer Katie Jacobs believes that Wilson and House both hide from mature relationships, which brings the two closer together. She has said that the difference between the two characters is that Wilson finds it hard to say no because he wants to please the other person. The similarities between Dr. Wilson and Dr. Watson was also one of the reasons that made Leonard choose House over Numb3rs.

Leonard has said that Wilson is one of the few characters to voluntarily maintain a relationship with House, because neither of them work for one another and thus his character has "nothing to lose" by telling him the truth. His character is one of the few who can make House laugh. Katie Jacobs has said that Wilson's moving into House's apartment after a failed relationship in "Sex Kills" symbolizes his taking "emotional refuge" in his friend. Leonard said that he was content with the size of his role. He has also stated that he would "kill himself" if he had a role as big as the other cast members.

== Reception ==
Responses to Leonard's performance were mostly positive. In a recap of the pilot episode, Tom Shales of The Washington Post quoted "Leonard has been playing upstanding young men for what seems like forever, but he's still one of the most outstanding upstanding young men in the acting racket." However, Sherwin Nurland of Slate stated that Leonard often seems so detached that "he'd be better off in another show". In a recap of the season four episode "Ugly", Nina Smith of TV Guide said that she thinks that the most convincing writing of the show has always been the scenes in which Cuddy and Wilson "spar" with House. In a 2008 press conference, Katie Jacobs, who works as an executive producer for the show, praised Leonard for being equally adept at comedy and drama. TV Gal, of Zap2it, stated that she "truly appreciates" what Leonard brings to the show, being the only character who "truly stands up to House" and "quietly and subtly" giving the show "some of its best moments". In an article about whom to keep if the writers of House decided to minor down the cast, Maureen Ryan, of the Chicago Tribune said that Wilson can "never, never, never, never" leave the show. Ryan also listed Wilson on her list of "5 Great Characters", saying that Leonard is the "underrated linchpin of the excellent House cast".

After Wilson's temporary departure during House's fifth season, Mary McNamara of the Los Angeles Times immediately stated that she wanted the character to return to the show. Linda Stasi of the New York Post said that Dr. House's relationship with Lucas Douglas (Michael Weston), who temporarily replaced Wilson, was far more natural than House's relationship with Wilson. Critics from TV Guide, Entertainment Weekly, Blog Critics and USA Today, all found Leonard's performance in the season 4 finale worthy of an Emmy Award.
