= Both Sides Now (House) =

- House episode
- Episode no.: Season 5 Episode 24
- Directed by: Greg Yaitanes
- Written by: Doris Egan
- Original air date: May 11, 2009

Guest appearances
- Ashton Holmes as Scott; Maria Thayer as Annie; Jennifer Crystal Foley as Rachel Taub; Carl Reiner as Eugene Schwartz; Kal Penn as Dr. Lawrence Kutner; Anne Dudek as Dr. Amber Volakis

Episode chronology
← Previous "Under My Skin"	Next → "Broken"
- House season 5

"Both Sides Now" is the twenty-fourth episode and season finale of the fifth season of House. It originally aired on Fox on May 11, 2009.

== Plot ==
House wakes up at his apartment after having sex with Cuddy after spending the night detoxing from Vicodin. He discovers that she has left her lipstick on his bathroom counter, he pockets the lipstick, and goes to work in a cheerful mood and a remarkable lack of pain.

House and the team are intrigued by Scott (Ashton Holmes), a man who underwent procedure to treat epilepsy, leaving him with independently functioning left and right brain hemispheres, resulting in losing control over his left hand.

Meanwhile, Cuddy tells House that their relationship must be that of employer and employee. House tells Wilson about the events last night; Wilson advises that he talk to her, advice which House ignores. Instead he begins a campaign to annoy and provoke her, an attempt to break through her composure.

In a final attempt to provoke Cuddy into examining her true feelings for him, House announces to everyone in the main lobby of the hospital that the two had sex. Cuddy responds by confronting him and then firing him after he suggests that they move in together. Afterwards, the team discovers that Scott is suffering from a reaction to an ingredient in the industrial-strength antiperspirant he uses.

House then goes to talk to Cuddy in her office, and asks her if she could possibly be overreacting to the previous night. She finally admits that maybe she is, since he has "said plenty of lousy things to [her] before." House seems confused, as he assumed that she was overreacting to her and House having sex and what it could mean to their employer-employee relationship.

House thinks back to the night before, realising that he never told Cuddy he was having hallucinations. He had actually insulted her, driving her home, and she never accompanied him to his apartment to help him detox. His mind jumped back to the present, as he reaches into his pocket, discovering that the lipstick was actually a bottle of Vicodin. He drops the bottle on the floor and gingerly backs away from it. Cuddy, now realising House is not joking, rushes to him and asks if he is okay. Hallucinations of the deceased Amber and Kutner then appear to House, as he fearfully tells Cuddy that he is not okay. Wilson drives House to a psychiatric hospital, while the rest of the team happily looks on at Cameron and Chase's wedding.

== Production ==
Filming for the ending of the episode took place at Greystone Park Psychiatric Hospital. The building had previously been abandoned in 2007 due to deteriorating conditions and opening of new buildings. It was reused for some of the sixth season.

The brief hallucination of Lawrence Kutner was discarded footage from an earlier episode. His actor (Kal Penn) was unavailable, having recently joined the Obama administration.

== Release ==
"Both Sides Now" was released on May 11, 2009. It was the 24th and final episode of House season 5.

The episode is considered one of the best episodes of House. The staff of Collider noted the episode is among the highest listed on IMDb. The A.V. Club's Zack Handlen rated the episode an A−.

Canwest News Service's Alex Strachan felt the episode was a "typical" episode of House noting that it was somewhat formulaic. Despite this he enjoyed the episode.
