= Pilot (House) =

Pilot episode of House, 2004

- House episode
- Episode no.: Season 1 Episode 1
- Directed by: Bryan Singer
- Written by: David Shore
- Production code: HOU-101
- Original air date: November 16, 2004
- Running time: 44 minutes

Guest appearances
- Robin Tunney as Rebecca Adler; Andrew Airlie as Orange Colored Patient

Episode chronology
← Previous —	Next → "Paternity"
- House season 1

"Pilot", also known as "Everybody Lies", is the pilot episode of the medical drama House. It premiered on the Fox network on November 16, 2004. It introduces the character of managerial, antisocial Dr. Gregory House (played by Hugh Laurie) and his team of diagnosticians at the fictional Princeton-Plainsboro Teaching Hospital in New Jersey. The episode features House's attempts to diagnose a kindergarten teacher after she collapses in class.

House was created by David Shore, who got the idea for the misanthropic title character from a doctor's visit. Initially, producer Bryan Singer wanted an American to play House, but British actor Hugh Laurie's audition convinced him that a foreign actor could play the role. Shore wrote House as a character with parallels to Sherlock Holmes—both are drug users, blunt, and close to being friendless. The show's producers wanted House disabled in some way and gave the character a damaged leg arising from an improper diagnosis.

The episode received generally positive reviews; the character of House was widely noted as a unique aspect of the episode and series, though some reviewers believed that such a cruel character would not be tolerated in real life. Other complaints with the episode included stereotyped supporting characters and an implausible premise. The initial broadcast of "Pilot" was watched by approximately seven million viewers, making it the 62nd-most-watched show of the week.

== Plot ==
Shortly after the start of class, kindergarten teacher Rebecca Adler becomes dysphasic and experiences seizures. Dr. James Wilson attempts to convince Gregory House to treat Adler (who Wilson claims is his cousin), but House initially dismisses him, believing that the case would be boring. Hospital administrator Dr. Lisa Cuddy approaches House in the elevator and attempts to persuade him to fulfill his duties at the hospital's walk-in clinic. House refuses, claiming that Cuddy cannot fire him due to tenure, and hurriedly leaves. When House's team attempts to perform an MRI on Adler, they discover that House's authorization for diagnostics has been revoked; Cuddy restores his authorization in exchange for his working at the clinic.

Adler's throat closes up during the MRI due to an allergic reaction to gadolinium, prompting two members of House's team, Dr. Robert Chase (Jesse Spencer) and Dr. Allison Cameron (Jennifer Morrison), to perform a tracheotomy. In the hospital's clinic, House's first patient is a man who is orange because of an over-consumption of carrots and vitamins (niacin). House also treats a ten-year-old boy whose mother allows him to use his asthmatic inhaler only intermittently instead of daily as prescribed. House criticizes the mother for making such a drastic medical decision without first learning more about asthma. During his monologue, House stumbles on an idea and leaves quickly to treat Adler; he diagnoses her with cerebral vasculitis, despite having no proof. House treats Adler with steroids, which improves her condition greatly for a time, until she starts seizing and has heart failure.

On House's insistence, neurologist Dr. Eric Foreman and Cameron break into Adler's house to find anything that might account for Adler's symptoms. They find an opened package of ham in Adler's kitchen and House concludes that she is suffering from neurocysticercosis from eating undercooked pork at some point in her past. Adler refuses to accept more random treatments unless there is conclusive evidence that the diagnosis is correct. House is ready to dismiss the case when Chase provides an idea for noninvasive evidence of Adler's tapeworm infection. By taking an X-ray of her thigh, House proves that Adler is infested with other tapeworms and her condition is treatable. After seeing the evidence, Adler agrees to take medication to kill the tapeworms. Adler is then visited by her kindergarten class upon her recovery.

== Production ==
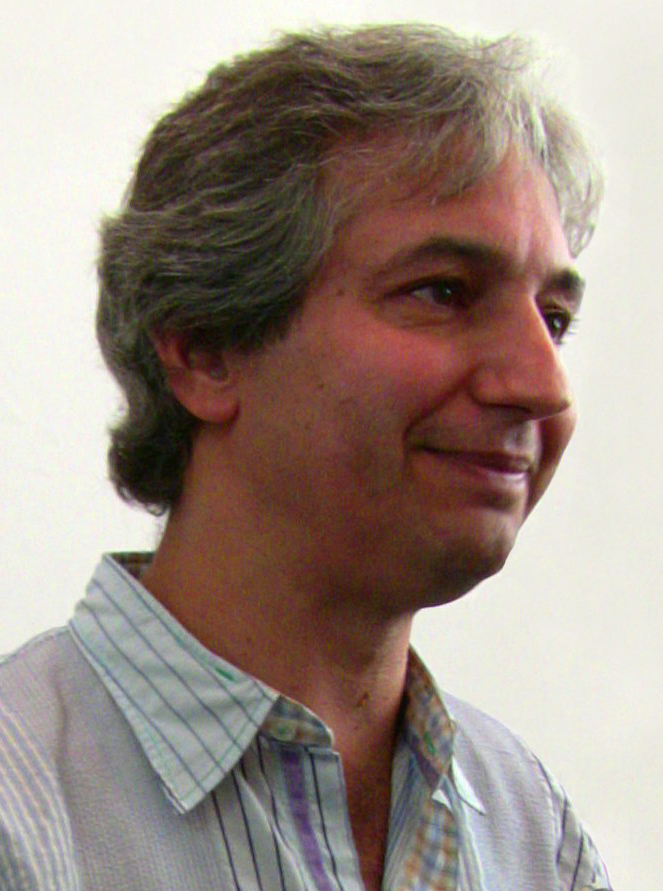
Series creator David Shore wrote the pilot with a vivid memory of a doctor's visit.

In 2003, executive producers Katie Jacobs and Paul Attanasio approached David Shore about developing a series with them. Attanasio, inspired by the "Diagnosis" column in The New York Times Magazine, suggested a medical-themed procedural. Shore was initially not eager about the medical focus, but found the networks they pitched to were interested in the concept. The trio pitched House to the Fox Broadcasting Company as a medical detective show—a hospital whodunit where the doctors would be the sleuths looking for the source of symptoms. The ideas behind House's character were added after Fox bought the show. Shore was inspired by a vivid memory of a doctor's visit: he once had to wait two weeks to get a doctor's appointment for a sore hip, by which point his pain had disappeared. Nevertheless, he went to the appointment, and Shore recalled thinking they were "incredibly polite" even as he wasted their time; he liked the idea of a doctor who would have been blunt with their patient. Shore said that the writings of Berton Roueché, a The New Yorker staff writer who chronicled intriguing medical cases, inspired the plots for "Pilot" and other early episodes.

As Shore developed an outline for the show, he was afraid it was developing into a more character-focused series, rather than a procedural. Attanasio suggested not showing the network an outline, and instead giving them a full pilot script. The pilot took Shore five months to write, and the completed script was delivered in early 2004. Shore recalled there were relatively few changes to what he wrote; one significant change was moving the setting from Boston to Princeton. Director Bryan Singer suggested the change because he had grown up in Princeton and liked the smaller, more academic-focused setting that was less commonly seen on television.

A key element of the show's premise was the handicapped main character. The initial idea was for House to use a wheelchair, but Fox turned this down (for which the crew was later grateful). The wheelchair idea turned into a scar on House's face, which later turned into an injured leg necessitating the use of a cane. Shore drew on the character of Sherlock Holmes for House, as he was always a fan of the character and found the character's traits of indifference to his clients unique. The parallels to Holmes informed the House-Wilson dynamic.

After Fox green-lit the pilot, the production began casting. House's casting directors had previously worked on Jacobs and Attanasio's series Century City (TV series). While ideally the production would have cast their lead and then built the cast around them, the competitive rush of pilot season meant that roles were filled whenever they could. Wilson was the first role cast, followed by Cuddy and Cameron. Laurie was not cast as House until two weeks before photography for the pilot commenced. Laurie had put together an audition tape in a dingy hotel bathroom in Namibia while shooting Flight of the Phoenix, using an umbrella for a cane. The roles of Chase and Foreman were cast soon after.

The episode was shot in Vancouver, Canada; later episodes would be shot on soundstages in California. The show was not called House until days into filming. The music was composed by Christopher Hoag in his only work for the series; subsequent episodes would be scored by Jon Ehrlich and Jason Derlatka.

== Analysis ==
The pilot episode establishes much of the formula the series would heavily rely on for the structure of most of its episodes; this predictable structure would be considered part of the show's appeal. The episode opens with a "teaser" that shows the individual's medical mystery that House and his team will diagnose; the middle showcases House's unorthodox methods, including breaking into a patient's home to identify a possible cause for the illness; possible diagnoses are discussed using metaphors for the benefit of the viewer; and the "eureka" moments where a sudden insight reveals the true diagnosis. The recurring theme that "everyone lies" is repeatedly underlined throughout the episode, beginning with the patient's lies to their coworker in the teaser. In this episode, the notoriously patient-averse House pays Adler a bedside visit, revealing personal history to convince her to fight for her life; House occasionally makes similar patient visits in later episodes. It also sketches out the main aspects of the cast and their relationships, particularly House's focus on unique or uncommon medical diagnoses, his dry personality, and his relationships with Wilson, Cuddy, and the team. In comparison with later episodes, the pilot has a greater focus on the patient, and some character elements are adjusted as the series continued; House is much more casually-dressed, and the diagnostic team are less removed from their boss. Another staple of earlier episodes are the clinic visits House reluctantly takes on.

== Reception ==
House's premiere episode was generally well received, with the show being considered a bright spot in Fox's otherwise reality television-heavy broadcast schedule. New York called the series "medical TV at its most satisfying and basic," and stated that the cast consisted of "[professional] actors playing doctors who come to care about their patients," while other reviews appreciated that the episode did not sugarcoat the flaws of the characters or the medical industry. TV Guide's Matt Roush stated House was a better alternative to common television medical dramas. Critics at The A.V. Club were concerned the formula established in the pilot might turn repetitive, but felt the dialogue and irreverence prevented boredom.

Critics generally reacted positively to the character of House; Tom Shales of The Washington Post called him "the most electrifying character to hit television in years." The Seattle Times's Kay McFadden and USA Today's Robert Bianco wrote that Laurie's portrayal turned an otherwise unlikeable character into a compelling one to watch, and The Los Angeles Times's Paul Brownfield felt the character alone elevated the show from formulaic procedural. In comparison, Sherwin Nuland of Slate felt that the meanness of House would be unrealistic in a real hospital setting, and Halo Boedeker of the Orlando Sentinel felt that the role "smothered" Laurie's charm.

Reviews often highlighted the show's heavy use of medical imagery as too gory or a turnoff for some viewers. In contrast, Shales wrote that the CSI: Crime Scene Investigation-influenced effects were well done and reminded viewers of the complexity of the human body. Other reviews highlighted the perceived stereotypes of young, attractive doctors, and a lack of characterization for the supporting characters in the early episodes.

The episode's format was compared to NBC's Medical Investigation, which premiered the same season and featured a gruff diagnostician and harmful tapeworms. USA Today favorably considered House more character-driven than Investigation's plot-heavy procedural format, and the San Francisco Chronicle felt that House was the better show due to the title character. Variety's Brian Lowry, meanwhile, stated that the two shows were too similar and House was mismatched among Fox's other programs.

The premiere attracted approximately seven million viewers in the United States, making it the 62nd-most-watched show for the week of November 15–21, 2004. The United Kingdom terrestrial premiere was broadcast on June 9, 2005, by Five and garnered a ten percent share (1.8 million viewers). Christopher Hoag, who composed the music for this episode and the first season of House, was nominated in the 2005 Primetime Emmy Awards for Outstanding Music Composition for the episode. Shore received a Humanitas Prize nomination for writing the episode, but lost out to John Wells, who wrote the episode of The West Wing entitled "NSF Thurmont". Fox marketing Vice President Chris Carlisle promoted the show by distributing nearly two million free DVDs of the episode through Entertainment Weekly and People.

== Sources ==
- House M.D. Season 1 — Special Features (DVD). Universal Studios Home Entertainment. August 30, 2005.
- Challen, Paul (2007). The House that Hugh Laurie Built. ECW Press. ISBN 978-1-55022-803-8.
- Barnett, Barbara (2010). Chasing Zebras: The Unofficial Guide to House, M.D. ECW Press. ISBN 978-1-55022-955-4.
- Jackman, Ian (2010). House, M.D.: The Official Guide to the Hit Medical Drama. HarperCollins. ISBN 978-0-06-187661-5.
