= Lisa Cuddy =

Lisa Cuddy, M.D.
- House character
- First appearance: "Pilot" (1.01)
- Last appearance: "Moving On" (7.23)
- Created by: David Shore
- Portrayed by: Lisa Edelstein

In-universe information
- Gender: Female
- Occupation: Dean of Medicine; Endocrinologist
- Family: Arlene Cuddy (mother); Julia Cuddy (sister)
- Significant others: Gregory House; Lucas Douglas
- Children: Rachel Cuddy (adoptive)

Lisa Cuddy, M.D., is a fictional character on the medical drama House. She is portrayed by Lisa Edelstein. Cuddy was the dean of medicine of the fictional Princeton-Plainsboro Teaching Hospital in New Jersey. Cuddy quit her job after the events of season seven's finale "Moving On".

== Storylines ==
Cuddy's job title in House is Dean of Medicine and Hospital Administrator. She is Jewish, and has a mother and one sister; her father is dead. She began dreaming of becoming a doctor when she was 12, graduated from medical school at age 25 as second best in her class, and became the first female and second youngest Dean of Medicine at the age of 32 (she was actually 29 but she added three years to her age in order to seem more mature to the Selection Committee). Cuddy attended the University of Michigan, where she first met Gregory House (Hugh Laurie), and with whom she shared a one-night stand.

After hiring House to run the hospital's Diagnostics Department, Cuddy began setting aside $50,000 a year from the hospital's budget for potential legal expenses. When, during Season 1, the new Chairman of the Board Edward Vogler (Chi McBride) tries to have House fired for refusing to kowtow to his demands, Cuddy urges the board to save House and remove Vogler instead, losing the $100 million donation he had made to the hospital. In Season 2, it is revealed that Cuddy is trying to conceive a child. House agrees to administer the twice-daily injections necessary for her to undergo in-vitro fertilization and to keep the matter secret. In Season 3, Cuddy confesses to the hospital's Head of Oncology and House's best friend Wilson (Robert Sean Leonard) that she has made a total of three attempts at impregnation, one of which was miscarried. She is hurt when House, who was going through Vicodin withdrawal, tells her it is a good thing she has failed to become a mother, as she would suck at it. When House's career is threatened by Detective Michael Tritter (David Morse), Cuddy falsifies documents and perjures herself in court to cover up his wrongdoing.

Cuddy questions whether House has a romantic interest in her when he interrupts her repeatedly during a blind date. When Wilson takes Cuddy to the theatre and later to an art exhibition, House intervenes in an attempt to prevent Cuddy from becoming Wilson's fourth wife. In Season 5, Cuddy reveals that she is adopting a baby girl, to be named Joy, and then is devastated when the birth-mother decides to keep the baby. House consoles her, and the two share a passionate kiss. Cuddy professes not to want a relationship with House but is touched when he has her old desk from medical school brought out of storage for her when her office is renovated. In episode "Joy to the World", Cuddy becomes a foster mother and potential adoptive mother to a baby girl she names Rachel. She initially struggles with motherhood, revealing to Wilson that she feels nothing for Rachel but soon begins to bond with her. In the episode "Under My Skin", Cuddy helps House detox from Vicodin; and the two sleep together. In the following episode, the Season 5 finale "Both Sides Now", this is revealed to have been a hallucination on House's part: in reality, he spent the evening alone and is suffering from psychiatric problems as a result of Vicodin and emotional trauma.

Throughout Season 6, Cuddy is busy with her adopted daughter and is in a relationship with a private investigator, Lucas, who was hired by House to spy on Wilson at the start of Season 5. She cared for House after he goes through rehab for Vicodin. After sensing romantic feelings from House, Cuddy tells House that she would like to be friends; but he refuses, quoting that is the "last thing he wants". In the Season 6 finale "Help Me", House gives Cuddy an antique medical text written by her great-grandfather, which prompts her to confess that she and Lucas were engaged. Cuddy, House and House's team go to Trenton to help victims where a crane collapsed on a building. House finds a woman named Hanna who is trapped under a mountain of rubble. The first responders and Cuddy both tell House that Hanna's leg needs to be amputated for a chance of survival. House and Hanna refuse for this to happen. House and Cuddy later get in an argument over it. Cuddy claims that the reason why he is refusing is because he is bitter over her engagement and what he went through with his leg years ago. During their argument, Cuddy tells him that she doesn't love him and to move on. House then decides to amputate Hanna's leg. Afterwards she is sent to the hospital but on the way she dies due to a fat embolism, caused by the amputation. With the pain he is dealing with, Hanna's death, and what Cuddy said to him earlier, when House arrives home he rips the bathroom mirror off the wall to get his stash of Vicodin. As he gets ready to take the pills, Cuddy arrives just in time. She reveals to him that even though she was moving on with her life she can't stop thinking about him. She broke off her engagement to Lucas and tells House that she loves him and they kiss. He asks her if he is hallucinating this and she asks if he took the Vicodin. He says no and drops the pills on the floor. They smile and kiss again.

Cuddy's relationship with House progressed throughout most of Season 7. In Episode 15, "Bombshells", Cuddy discovers blood in her urine. After several tests, Wilson finds a mass in Cuddy's kidney and schedules a biopsy to take place later in the episode. Further "imaging shows enhancing masses across multiple lobes of Cuddy's lungs", of which Foreman points out "That's what kidney cancer looks like when it metastasizes". Finally, just before surgery to have the tumor removed, House shows up to support his girlfriend through this tough time. Cuddy realizes at the end of the episode that the only reason House was able to overcome his selfishness was because he had taken Vicodin before visiting her in the hospital. It is here that Cuddy breaks off the relationship with House after confronting him regarding her suspicion of his relapse. In the Season 7 finale, an angry House rams his car into her house. She resigns as Dean of Medicine after this event with Eric Foreman eventually replacing her.

== Characterization ==
Cuddy was created by executive producer Bryan Singer, who had enjoyed Lisa Edelstein's portrayal of a high-priced call girl putting herself through law school on The West Wing, and sent her a copy of the pilot script. Edelstein was attracted to the program's "smart writing", and was cast in the role. The character has been described as "tough-as-nails" by Salon's Lily Burana, a woman who "clicks through the halls of the fictional Princeton-Plainsboro Hospital in low-cut sweaters and pencil skirts, bringing incredible Jewy glamour to prime time". The New York Times's Alessandra Stanley has similarly referred to her as the hospital's "comely but by-the-book chief administrator [...] who, like all heads of prestigious teaching hospitals, wears plunging necklines to work." Edelstein, questioned on whether she felt Cuddy's typical attire of tight-fitting, low-cut outfits was appropriate for her position, responded: "She doesn't care what people say [...] She's a television character, and I'm an actress playing a hospital administrator, and I don't want to be in frumpy clothes. I want to be a hot hospital administrator." TV Guide's Nina Hämmerling Smith calls Cuddy a foil for House, who "doesn't take [his] nonsense and knows how to keep him in check — more or less." The Washington Post's Tom Shales has deemed Cuddy House's "nagging nemesis", whose role is "to make House miserable". Discussing Cuddy's characterization in terms of her relationship with House, Edelstein has opined:

I think that she very much loves House and also lives vicariously through him, because she's a very smart woman who was very successful as a doctor and has a great job and a wonderful position, but also has had less and less to do with the actual practice of medicine as the years have gone by. So I think she's excited by what he does and how he does it and deeply frustrated by him at the same time.

Co-executive producer Garrett Lerner has praised Edelstein's versatility in the role when asked to summarize Cuddy, stating:

Lisa Edelstein can do absolutely anything, so, she's fantastic. You know, she can stand up to House, give it right back to him. She can be tender, she can be hurt, she can be strong...I think she's probably [the favorite character for] a lot of people I've talked to. It's a powerful role.

== Development ==
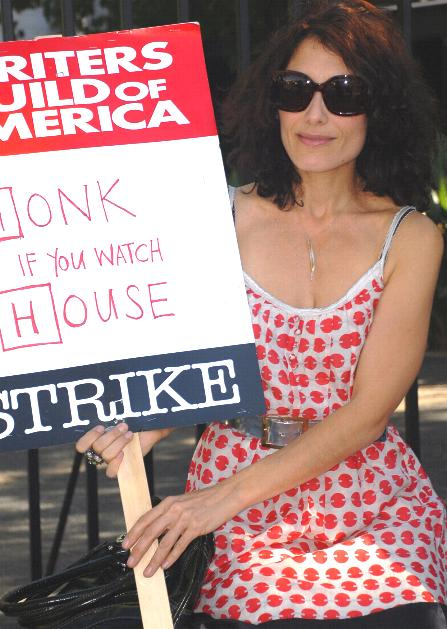
Edelstein picketed during the 2007–2008 Writers Guild of America strike, which halted the development of Cuddy and House's relationship.

During the early fourth season of House, Cuddy received reduced screen time as the show focused on House's new fellows. Edelstein revealed that the show would return to its regular format after the season's ninth episode. However, production was halted by the 2007–2008 Writers Guild of America strike, which delayed the remainder of the season. Edelstein commented: "Cuddy won't be sleeping with House unless we get the writers back. So I'm out there picketing." As a result of the strike, storylines involving Cuddy had to be pushed back into the show's fifth season, as the fourth season ran for a reduced number of episodes.

When Edelstein heard she had to do a strip scene in the episode "House's Head", she called actress Sheila Kelley, wife of Richard Schiff (with whom Edelstein had worked previously on The West Wing and Relativity). Kelley had worked on a movie about strippers long ago and Edelstein asked her for her advice on the choreography of the striptease. On the episode itself, Edelstein commented: "It is very interesting what happens in the first half of the finale in terms of learning about how House sees people and getting the world from his point of view entirely". Before the filming of the scene started, Edelstein showed the dance to Hugh Laurie, who, according to Edelstein, was "incredibly supportive, like a cheerleader". Edelstein commented that after the scene was filmed she, "felt beautiful, and it ended up being a really lovely experience".

Cuddy's desire for a baby paralleled Edelstein's personal life, with the actress explaining: "When the show started, I told the producers that at some point during the run of the show, if it was successful, that I was going to get pregnant one way or another. So they planted that seed in the character's story so it would be possible for me as a woman to experience that." When Cuddy became a mother to Rachel in the show's fifth season, executive producer Katie Jacobs discussed the need for Cuddy to find a balance between her personal and professional life, as well as the impact motherhood would have on her relationship with House:

The tension and chemistry are still there. Neither one of them is actively fessing-up to looking for a relationship, but they are drawn to each other. None of the flirtatiousness is going to go away. The stakes are very high for them. The attraction is still there. We are absolutely going to continue that. It's real and it's palpable. And it's who they are.

Cuddy had a difficult relationship with her mother (played by Candice Bergen) after her father died. Although they are cordial, they tend to hide things from each other: Cuddy had misgivings about House meeting her mother for a long time; her mother hid an affair she was having for five years.

=== "Huddy" ===
The relationship between House and Cuddy is known by the portmanteau term "Huddy". Cuddy has what USA Today's Peter Johnson terms a "cat-and-mouse" relationship with House. Edelstein has described it as "a really complicated, adult relationship", explaining: "These are people who have very full lives and lots of responsibilities that perhaps conflict with their feelings for each other." The actress "would love for them to have a [romantic] relationship, because it could be as complicated as the rest of their relationship", however, she is unsure how it would affect the dynamics of the show. Jacobs commented at the end of the show's third season: "I can't see them pairing them in a permanent fashion. But they are close; they have gone through a lot together. Might there be a moment of weakness in which the two might explore their chemistry? Maybe." Questioned at the end of the fourth season on whether Cuddy and House would ever consummate their relationship on-screen, Jacobs responded: "there is heat and chemistry between them and I never want to see that go away because that is the essence of their relationship. [...] we'll never ignore [their chemistry] because, as I said, it's the very essence of them. She wouldn't forgive him over and over again if he wasn't so brilliant in her eyes, clearly she's got a soft spot for him. And he has one for her. You will continue to see that." Prior to the beginning of the fifth season, series creator David Shore discussed his intention to further the relationship between the two, as: "If House is capable of any relationship with anyone, it's Cuddy. We can't have them dancing around forever." Following the fifth season revelation that House had hallucinated a physical relationship with Cuddy, Shore commented on the storyline's continuation into the sixth season: "it would be dishonest to just let that disappear. Obviously House has feelings for her. Even though the love affair didn't happen, in House's mind it did." Edelstein does not know whether the two characters will eventually end up together, however believes that the combination of frustration and love Cuddy feels for House "makes for a very interesting relationship", as: "there's a great deal of admiration and respect, and also an incredible amount of annoyance and frustration, which is like how most relationships are in your life." At the very end of the sixth-season finale, "Help Me", House and Cuddy appear to have entered a romantic relationship. In the closing minutes of the episode, House came very close to relapsing and taking Vicodin once again, at which point Cuddy entered to tell him that she had ended her relationship with Lucas. She professed her love for House, which led to them kissing briefly. A close-up shot of their clasped hands was the closing shot of the episode, as well as the season. The relationship later ends in the season 7 episode; "Bombshells".

== Reception ==
In 2005, Edelstein won the Satellite Award for Best Supporting Actress in a Series, Miniseries or Motion Picture Made for Television for her role as Cuddy. Following the show's pilot episode, Tom Shales noted in The Washington Post that: "The skirmishes between House and Cuddy could get awfully tired, but by the second episode there are already some provocative wrinkles in what had seemed a simple situation." TV Guide's Nina Hämmerling Smith has deemed the banter between Cuddy and House "one of the best things about the show", while Salon's Lily Burana has declared herself to be on "Team Cuddy" in terms of House's romantic interests. Following the season three episode "Merry Little Christmas", Mary McNamara for the LA Times wrote: "The Avid Viewer was also happy to see the seeds of a romantic relationship between House and Cuddy being sown — that had to be part of the show's original bible because really, who else could survive a romantic relationship with House now that Sela Ward's gone?" McNamara has opined that a romantic relationship between the two "makes perfect sense", as "she is the only one who seems able to accept House as he is, to give almost as good as she gets and to let most of his barbs fall where they may. How Edelstein can play this in a believable way is the point where acting moves from skill to art." When the show underwent a change of format at the beginning of the fourth series, McNamara commented positively on the changing dynamic in Cuddy's relationship with House, noting:

gone is the increasingly dull and unbelievable tension between him and Cuddy. (As subordinate/boss, that is. The sexual tension, one hopes, is still in there somewhere.) Cuddy is done trying to squelch him; now she is just shooting for managed chaos. Which is so much more fun because it revolves more around the medicine and less around all the personal pathos of the staff.

However, as USA Today's Robert Bianco noted, when Cuddy and House finally began a physical relationship, in what later transpired to be a hallucination sequence, "It started a firestorm among fans who hated the change in the relationship". Following the pair's first screen kiss, IGN reviewer James Chamberlin opined that the event was "kind of awkward" and "just didn't feel right to me". With regards to Cuddy's season five storylines as a whole, Chamberlin commented: "Cuddy's interest in becoming a mother was something I enjoyed. [..] This plot contained some heart-wrenching moments, particularly when Cuddy had to a take on the case as both a doctor and a potential mother in "Joy." The New York Times's Lisa Belkin has also praised Cuddy's motherhood storyline, citing her as one of few examples of good parenting on television.

Discussing the numerous YouTube fan videos dedicated to the "Huddy" relationship, The New York Times's Ginia Bellafante has assessed: "It is not merely the unrelenting push-pull of the show's writing, but the "His Girl Friday" chemistry between the actors Hugh Laurie (House) and Lisa Edelstein (Cuddy) that inspires otherwise reasonable women to bizarre, time-consuming digressions of fantasy." Bellafante considers herself amongst these women, writing:

Shamefully, I would have been overjoyed if the season finale had ended with House and Cuddy electing to spend the summer together in Corsica. This would have betrayed the show's primary covenant—to keep House miserable—and entirely erased its integrity. And yet I would mostly have wondered if House and Cuddy were going to make time for a stop in Sardinia.

Following the fifth-season finale's revelation that the consummation of their relationship was a hallucination, Bellafante wrote: "I feel used and manipulated. I feel like a one-night stand who is never going to get calla lilies or a follow-up phone call. I feel hate for the show and I feel begrudging respect." Despite this, it is Bellafante's opinion that: "basically the show went in the obvious right direction, gratifying our base collective urge to finally see House and Cuddy together, not talking about lumbar punctures, in a fake-sex way that didn't ultimately impinge on the show's credibility." She considered:

What would we really have done if House and Cuddy had woken up together, if he'd made her waffles, if she had eaten them wearing one of his shirts, if they spent the next day exchanging coy, knowing glances at Princeton-Plainsboro Hospital? Then we would have been watching Grey's Anatomy and we would have experienced not a jump-the-shark moment, but a bungee-jumping-the-Arctic moment.

Her conclusion is that:

House refuses to buy into the myth that a good woman can save an ornery jerk, and the finale made it clear what a dope you were to even think the show would try. It doesn't want to appease the woman who wants to appease her Harlequin Romance self. It wants to appease anyone who gets ticked off when a romantic comedy shows an accomplished woman in a skirt suit giving it all up for a jobless, slovenly idiot. The House-Cuddy attraction isn't an attraction of opposites. It's an attraction between two highly intelligent workaholics, two people too interesting for anyone else but ultimately unfit for each other—no matter how pathetically we'd like it to be otherwise.

Mike Hale for The New York Times has praised Edelstein's performance as Cuddy in comedic situations, writing:

Lisa Edelstein may not be the funniest performer around, but she is without a doubt the best sport in American television: every week the writers of House find new ways to embarrass her and her character, Dr. Cuddy, who is engaged in an excruciating mating dance with Hugh Laurie's Dr. House. Ms. Edelstein somehow manages to maintain her dignity while playing a 40-something dean of medicine who acts like a teenage girl.

The fourth season scene in which Cuddy did a pole dance was very positively received by critics, Mary McNamara stated that these scenes "in three minutes earned back the price of TiVo". James Chamberlin stated that he never expected Edelstein to do a strip tease, although he had hoped it.

Lisa Cuddy was elected TV's Most Crushworthy Female Doctor over Remy "Thirteen" Hadley in a poll held by Zap2it.
