= Gregory House =

Protagonist of the TV series House

Gregory House, M.D.
- House character
- Hugh Laurie portraying House
- First appearance: "Pilot" (S1E1)
- Last appearance: "Everybody Dies" (S8E22)
- Created by: David Shore
- Based on: Sherlock Holmes
- Portrayed by: Hugh Laurie

In-universe information
- Nickname: House
- Occupation: Head of Diagnostic Medicine; Infectious disease physician; Board-certified nephrologist
- Family: Col. John House (father); Blythe House (mother)
- Significant others: Stacy Warner (ex-girlfriend); Lisa Cuddy (ex-girlfriend); Dominika Petrova (green card wife, separated)
- Alma mater: Johns Hopkins School of Medicine; University of Michigan Medical School

Gregory House is a fictional character and the titular protagonist of the American medical drama series House. Created by David Shore and portrayed by English actor Hugh Laurie, he leads a team of diagnosticians and is the Head of Diagnostic Medicine at the fictional Princeton-Plainsboro Teaching Hospital in Princeton, New Jersey. House's character has been described as a misanthrope, cynic, narcissist, nihilist and curmudgeon.

In the series, the character's unorthodox diagnostic approaches, radical therapeutic motives, and stalwart rationality have resulted in much conflict between him and his colleagues. House is also often portrayed as lacking sympathy for his patients, a practice that allows him time to solve ethical enigmas. The character is partly based on Sherlock Holmes. A portion of the show's plot centers on House's habitual use of Vicodin to manage pain stemming from leg infarction involving his quadriceps muscle some years earlier, an injury that forces him to walk with a cane. This dependency is also one of the many parallels to Holmes, who is portrayed as being a habitual user of cocaine and other drugs.

The character received generally positive reviews and was included in several "best of" lists. Tom Shales of The Washington Post called House "the most electrifying character to hit television in years". For his portrayal, Laurie won various awards, including two Golden Globe Awards for Best Actor in a Television Series – Drama, two Screen Actors Guild Awards for Best Actor from Drama Series, two Satellite Awards for Best Actor in a Television Series – Drama, two TCA Awards for Individual Achievement in Drama, and has received a total of six Primetime Emmy Award nominations for Outstanding Lead Actor in a Drama Series, which ties him for the most nominations in the category without a win.

== Character history ==
Gregory House was born to John and Blythe House on June 11, 1959, or May 15, 1959. House is a military brat; his father served as a Marine Corps aviator and transferred often to other bases during House's childhood. House presumably picked up his affinity with languages during this period and shows a level of understanding of Chinese, Greek, Japanese, Portuguese, Spanish, Hindi, and Yiddish. One place in which his father was stationed was Egypt, where House developed a fascination with archaeology and treasure-hunting, which led him to keep his treasure-hunting tools well into adulthood. Another station was Japan, where a 14-year-old House discovered his vocation after a rock-climbing incident with his friend. He witnessed the respect given to a buraku doctor who solved the case no other doctor could. He also spent some time in the Philippines, where he had dental surgery.

House loves his mother but hates his father, who he claims has an "insane moral compass", and deliberately attempts to avoid both parents. At one point (episode "One Day, One Room"), House tells a story of his parents leaving him with his grandmother, whose punishments constituted abuse. However, he later confesses it was his father who abused him. Due to this abuse, House never believed John was his biological father; at the age of 12, he inferred that a friend of the family with the same birthmark as himself was his real father. In the episode "Birthmarks", House discovers that John is not his biological father after ordering a DNA test. After a second DNA test was performed in the episode "Love is Blind", House discovers that the man he assumed to be his biological father, Thomas Bell, was not either. The identity of his real father remains unknown.

House first attended Johns Hopkins University for his undergraduate years as a physics major. Before fully committing to medicine as his discipline, he considered getting a Ph.D. in physics, researching dark matter. He was accepted to the Johns Hopkins School of Medicine and excelled during his time there. He was a frontrunner for a prestigious and competitive internship at the Mayo Clinic, but another student, Philip Weber, reported House for plagiarizing him, resulting in House's expulsion from Johns Hopkins and rejection from the internship. While appealing his expulsion, he studied at the University of Michigan Medical School and worked at a bookstore, where he met his future employer and love interest Lisa Cuddy, with whom he shared a night where "he gave her everything she asked for". Years later, Cuddy noted that House, although still a student, had already become "a legend" due to his diagnostic brilliance. After the appeal process, he was denied re-entry into Johns Hopkins. During a medical convention in New Orleans, House first saw his eventual best friend Dr. James Wilson. Wilson, who was going through his first divorce at the time, broke a mirror in frustration, and started a bar fight after a man repeatedly played "Leave a Tender Moment Alone" on a jukebox. Out of sheer boredom with the convention and to "have somebody to drink with", House paid for the damage, bailed him out, and hired an attorney to clear Wilson's name (which he failed to do), starting their professional and personal relationship. House identifies himself multiple times during the series as a "board-certified diagnostician with a double specialty in infectious disease and nephrology."

Approximately ten years before the beginning of the series, House entered into a relationship with Stacy Warner, a constitutional lawyer, after she shot him during a "Lawyers vs. Doctors" paintball match. Five years later, during a game of golf, he suffered an infarction in his right leg which went misdiagnosed for three days. House eventually diagnosed the infarction himself. An aneurysm in his thigh had clotted, leading to an infarction and causing his quadriceps muscle to become necrotic. House had the dead muscle bypassed to restore circulation to the remainder of his leg, risking organ failure and cardiac arrest. He was unwilling to allow an amputation, opting instead to endure excruciating post-operative pain to retain the use of his leg. However, after he was put into a chemically induced coma to sleep through the worst of the pain, Stacy, House's medical proxy, and Cuddy, who was House's doctor at the time, acted against his wishes and authorized a safer surgical middle-ground procedure between amputation and a bypass by removing just the dead muscle. This resulted in the partial loss of use in his leg and left House with a lesser, but still serious, level of pain for the rest of his life.

House could not forgive Stacy for making the decision after he obviously did not want the “safer” procedure; this was the reason Stacy eventually left him. House now suffers chronic pain in his thigh and uses a cane to aid his walking, though he often wields the cane for protection, pushing aside privacy curtains, stopping elevator doors, or knocking on doors. He also frequently takes Vicodin, a moderate to severe painkiller, to relieve his pain. House briefly breaks his dependency with psychiatric help, after he suffers a psychotic break. When Stacy makes her first appearance in season 1, she is married to a high school guidance counselor named Mark Warner. Although she and House have a brief intimate encounter during the second season, House eventually tells Stacy to go back to her husband, devastating her. In the season two finale "No Reason", the husband of one of House's former patients shoots him after his wife had committed suicide. At the beginning of season three, House temporarily regains his ability to walk and run after receiving ketamine treatment for his gunshot injuries; however, the chronic pain in his leg comes back and House, who seems depressed because of the returning pain, once again takes painkillers and uses his cane. The other doctors speculate his cane and opiate re-usage are due to his psychological tendencies. House eventually finds the one thing that seems to help the pain go away: practicing medicine. After he diagnoses a patient online for his team (without their knowledge), and shows his psychiatrist Dr. Nolan how this reduces his pain, Nolan suggests House resume his practice.

In season seven, when Cuddy, who is House's girlfriend at this point, has a brush with death, House goes back on Vicodin in order to cope with the fear of losing her. Near the end of season seven, House finds out the experimental drug he had been using caused fatal cancerous tumors in all of the lab rats in the experiment. He gets a CT scan of his leg and finds three tumors close to the surface of the skin in his leg. He goes home, cleans his bathroom, and attempts to perform surgery on his own leg to extract the tumors in his bathtub. In season eight, House finds himself in prison after running his car into Cuddy's house, as shown in the ending of the season finale of season seven. There he learns his need for Vicodin is a weakness when an inmate makes House steal twenty Vicodin pills or be killed. Throughout season eight, House's therapeutic use of Vicodin becomes more habitual, similar to his use before season five. The final season's opening episode partly explores what path an imprisoned House would take aside from practicing medicine, revealing physics as his other forte. The episode "Body & Soul" makes a nod to this with a reference to a particle physics text amongst his books, as mentioned by his then-wife Dominika Petrova. House fakes his own death in the series finale, thus giving up his ability to practice medicine, in order to spend time with Wilson, who has five months to live. He does this in order to avoid being sent back to prison for destroying an MRI machine when an insult to Eric Foreman destroys the hospital sewage system. The series ends with House and Wilson riding off into the countryside on motorcycles, as Dr. Chase takes over House's department.

== Personality ==
"Dr. House is a fascinating and daringly cantankerous enigma, the proverbial bitter pill who also happens to be a highly intuitive medical genius. He despises interacting with patients and prefers dealing with diseases – with medical mysteries that leave other doctors scratching their heads in befuddlement."
— Tom Shales describing the character.

House frequently shows off his cunning and biting wit, and enjoys picking people apart and mocking their weaknesses. House accurately deduces people's motives and histories from aspects of their personality, appearance, and behavior. His friend and colleague, Wilson, says that while some doctors have the "messiah complex" (they need to "save the world"), House has the "Rubik's complex" (he needs to "solve the puzzle"). House typically waits as long as possible before meeting his patients. When he does, he shows an unorthodox bedside manner and uses unconventional treatments. However, he impresses them with rapid and accurate diagnoses after seemingly not paying attention. This skill is demonstrated in a scene where House diagnoses an entire waiting room full of patients in little over one minute on his way out of the hospital clinic. House, although rarely visiting his patients, demonstrates that he is more than capable of using practical medical skills: for example, occasionally taking part in operations and reacting quickly when a patient has a cardiac arrest in front of him. Critics have described the character as "moody", "bitter", "antagonistic", "misanthropic", "cynical", and "grumpy", and as a "maverick", an "anarchist", a "sociopath", and a "curmudgeon".

Laurie describes House as a character who refuses to "obey the usual pieties of modern life" and expects to find a rare diagnosis when he is treating his patient. Many aspects of his personality are the antithesis of what might be expected from a doctor. Executive producer Katie Jacobs views House as a static character who is accustomed to living in misery. Jacobs has said that Dr. Wilson, his only friend in the show, and House both avoid mature relationships, which brings the two closer together. Leonard has said that Dr. Wilson is one of the few who voluntarily maintains a relationship with House, because he is free to criticize him.

Although House's crankiness is commonly misattributed to the chronic pain in his leg, both Stacy and Cuddy have said that he was the same before the infarction. To manage the pain, House takes Vicodin every day, and as a result has developed an addiction to the drug. He refuses to admit that he has an addiction ("I do not have a pain management problem, I have a pain problem"). However, after winning a bet from Cuddy by not taking the drug for a week, he concedes that he has an addiction, but says that it is not a problem because it does not interfere with his work or life. In the 2009 season House goes through detox and his addiction goes into remission, so to speak. However, it does seem that House may have gotten over his addiction in the season 6 premiere. House creator David Shore told the Seattle Times in 2006 that Vicodin is "becoming less and less useful a tool for dealing with his pain, and it's something [the writers] are going to continue to deal with, continue to explore".

House openly talks about, and makes references to, pornography. In "Lines in the Sand", he returns the flirtations of an underage female who is a daughter of a clinic patient. He regularly engages the services of prostitutes. He also likes to gamble, frequently making wagers.

House speaks multiple languages, demonstrating fluency in English, Spanish, Russian, Portuguese, Hindi, and Mandarin. He listens to jazz, plays the piano (as does Hugh Laurie) and has an interest in vintage electric guitars. House has often credited guitarist/songwriter Eric Clapton and composer Giacomo Puccini as his biggest musical influences, drawing parallels to those of Hugh Laurie. He is an avid gamer with a preference for handhelds (owning two Sony PSPs and three Nintendo handhelds, two Game Boys and a DS), is known to attend monster truck pulls with Wilson, and watches the soap operas General Hospital and the fictional Prescription Passion, as well as Judge Judy. House is a fan of the Philadelphia Phillies and Philadelphia Flyers. Like Laurie, he is a motorcyclist, riding a Honda CBR1000RR Repsol Edition, license plate Y91, as seen in "Swan Song", "Help Me", "Deception" and "Post Mortem"; otherwise, he drives a Dodge Dynasty sedan.

House is an atheist. He openly and relentlessly mocks colleagues and patients who express any belief in religion, deeming such beliefs illogical. He does not believe in an afterlife because he finds it is better to believe life "isn't just a test". However, in the season four episode "97 Seconds", he expresses sufficient interest in the possibility of an afterlife to electrocute himself in an effort to find out; he is dissatisfied with the results and denounces the possibility of an afterlife. This is also an example of House's tendency to self-experiment and submit to risky medical procedures in the name of truth. Over the course of the series, he disproves the effectiveness of a migraine cure by self-inducing a migraine and controlling the effects through drugs, undergoes a blood transfusion to assist with a diagnosis, and overdoses on physostigmine to improve his memory after sustaining head injuries, subsequently causing his heart to stop beating, then undergoes deep brain stimulation soon after. In "The Fix", he steals experimental medicine only tested in rats to try and regrow his thigh muscle, eliminating his pain. In the following episode, "After Hours", he finds out that the medicine causes tumors, and operates on himself in his bathtub based on a CT scan. Ultimately he is unable to continue and eventually brings in Cuddy, who sends him to the hospital.

"[House] enjoys pursuing the truth, and he knows we all see the world through our own lenses. He's constantly trying to strip himself of those biases, to get a clean, objective view of things."
— Shore to Variety.

House frequently says, "Everybody lies", but has jokingly remarked that he was lying when he said so. House criticizes social etiquette for lack of rational purpose and usefulness. Dr. Cameron states in the first episode of the first season "House doesn't believe in pretense... so he just says what he thinks". In the season three episode "Lines in the Sand", he explains how he envies an autistic patient because society allows the patient to forgo the niceties that he must suffer through. In the same episode, Dr. Wilson suggests that House might have Asperger syndrome. Asperger syndrome is characterized by a number of traits found in House, such as difficulty accepting the purpose of social rules, lack of concern for physical appearance, and resistance to change. Wilson later reveals to House that he does not truly believe House has Asperger syndrome, and that he only said this about House as a part of a ploy to soften Cuddy's opinion of House. House is a nonconformist and has little regard for how others perceive him. Throughout the series, he displays sardonic contempt for authority figures. House shows an almost constant disregard for his own appearance, possessing a permanent stubble and dressing informally in worn jeans, wrinkled shirts over rumpled T-shirts, and sneakers. He avoids wearing the standard white lab coat to avoid patients recognizing him as a doctor, preferring a shabby blazer or, less frequently, a motorcycle jacket.

=== Social behavior ===
House does not have much of a social life, and his only real friend is Dr. James Wilson. Wilson knew House before the infarction and looked after him when House's relationship with Stacy ended. Although they frequently analyze and criticize each other's motives, Wilson has risked his career to protect House. Wilson's job was terminated in the first season in an effort by Edward Vogler to dismiss House. Wilson's medical practice was damaged by Detective Michael Tritter in an investigation of House's narcotics consumption. House has quietly admitted, at several instances, that he is grateful for Wilson's presence, and has referred to Wilson as his best friend. When Wilson resigns and moves away from both New Jersey and House's friendship in the season 5 premiere, House is desperate to have his friend back, and hires a private investigator (Michael Weston) to spy on him. The two ultimately reconcile at House's father's funeral in a scene similar to their first meeting, only this time Wilson breaks a stained glass window with what appears to be a bottle of wine or alcohol in a moment of anger directed at House. In the series finale, House fakes his death both to get out of going to prison and to spend five remaining months with Wilson before he dies of cancer, after having spent the past third of the season helping him through difficult, risky and ultimately unsuccessful treatments and reckless "bucket list" wishes.

Lisa Edelstein has said that despite his sardonic personality, House is a character who is reliant on people surrounding him. Edelstein says this characteristic is portrayed on several occasions in the third season, during which House's medical career is in jeopardy due to investigations by Det. Michael Tritter (David Morse), who arrests him for possessing narcotics. House's legal trouble ends when Edelstein's character, Lisa Cuddy, commits perjury during his hearing. In Season 5, a relationship with Cuddy begins to blossom, as they are unable to deny feelings between each other. They share a kiss in episode six "Joy", sparking ongoing romantic tension. When Cuddy's office is destroyed by a gunman and is being renovated, she moves into House's office in what Wilson believes to be an attempt to get closer to House. House and Cuddy try to drive each other away, doing things to each other's offices to make them worse, but in an uncharacteristically kind move, House has Cuddy's mother send her medical school desk for her new office as a surprise. Cuddy is touched by what he did, but is devastated when she spots him with a prostitute he hired, not knowing he had done so only as a prank on Kutner and Taub. In the season finale "Both Sides Now" it is confirmed that House wishes to pursue a romantic relationship with Cuddy. In this episode, House believes he has slept with Cuddy and informs Wilson the following morning. This is revealed, however, to be a hallucination, a side effect of his Vicodin abuse. The House-Cuddy story culminates in the season 6 finale, "Help Me", when Cuddy cancels her engagement to Lucas to face the realization that she has loved House all along; they share a passionate kiss, hinting at a mutual willingness to try to develop a real relationship. However, in season 7, their relationship ends when House starts taking Vicodin again when he is faced with Cuddy possibly having a terminal illness. The season 6 finale "Help Me" shows that despite his personality, he cares deeply about his patients, especially those with whom he has formed an emotional bond. He almost relapses into his Vicodin addiction, but this is prevented by Cuddy confessing her love for House.

House has also been known to act as a mooch at times, frequently stealing food from Wilson. In "You Don't Want to Know", while House is searching for the cause of Thirteen's twitching, he claims to have stolen money from her wallet. In the same episode, Wilson observes that House's blood type is AB, the universal recipient, reflecting his desire to take whatever he can. In another episode, House reveals to Wilson that House has been borrowing larger and larger sums of money from Wilson without paying him back, just to see when Wilson would turn him down. In "Wilson's Heart", it was revealed that one of the reasons for Amber being on the bus with House during the fatal crash was that House fled Shari's Bar to stick Amber with his bar tab, but left his cane behind, causing Amber to follow House onto the bus to return the cane.

== Development ==
=== Conception ===
"The title diagnostician of the show would be as smart a physician as Dr. Kildare and as sharp a sleuth as Gil Grissom of CSI, it was important to us that he be damaged, both emotionally and physically."
— Shore on House's creation.

While the show was originally set to be a medical procedural, the idea changed when the writers started to explore the possibilities of a curmudgeonly title character. Shore traced the concept for the title character to his background as a patient at a teaching hospital. Shore recalled that "I knew, as soon as I left the room, they would be mocking me relentlessly [for my cluelessness...] and I thought that it would be interesting to see a character who actually did that before they left the room". Shore also based the character partly on himself: in a 2006 interview with Maclean's he explained that he has a "cynical and cold attitude lurking within" him, and almost always agrees with House's point of view. A central part of the show's premise was that the main character would be disabled in some way. The initial idea was for House to use a wheelchair, inspired by the 1960s police drama Ironside, but Fox turned down this interpretation (for which the crew was later grateful). The wheelchair became a scar on House's face, which later turned into a bad leg necessitating the use of a cane. House usually holds his cane on the same side as his injured leg; Shore explained: "Some people feel more comfortable with the cane in the dominant arm, and that is acceptable". The cane tricks that are seen throughout the series are created by Laurie himself.

Cathy Crandall, costume designer for the show, created a look for the character that made it seem like he did not care about his clothing. She designed House with a wrinkled T-shirt, a blazer that is one size too short, faded and worn-in jeans and heather-gray rag socks. It was Laurie's idea to have the character wear sneakers, because he thought "a man with a cane needs functional shoes"; the Fox studios' wardrobe department kept thirty-seven pairs of Nike Shox on hand. House has worn T-shirts designed by famous designers such as Barking Irons and Lincoln Mayne, but also by less known designers such as Andrew Buckler and Taavo. The shirts are usually kept tied in a ball overnight to get them to wrinkle.

=== Casting ===
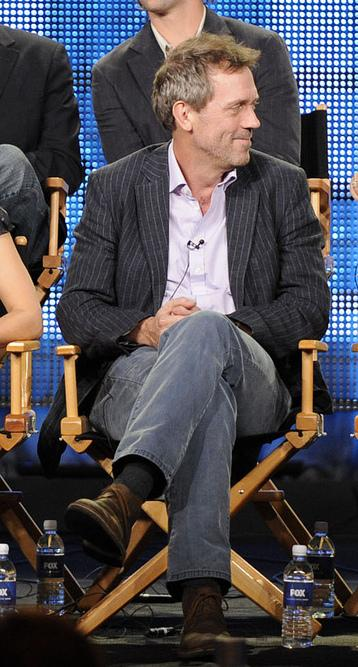
Hugh Laurie (pictured), who portrays House.

When casting for the part started, Shore was afraid that in "the wrong hands", House would "just be hateful". The casting directors were looking for someone who could, as Shore described, "do these horrible things and be somehow likable without just, you know, petting a kitten". When Laurie was asked to audition for the role of House, he was filming Flight of the Phoenix in Namibia. Laurie had no big expectations for the show, thinking that it would only "run for a few weeks". He planned to audition for the roles of both James Wilson and Gregory House. However, when he read that Wilson was a character with a "handsome open face", he decided to audition solely for the role of House. Laurie chose not to change his clothing, but to remain in the costume he wore for the film; he also decided not to shave his beard. He put together an audition tape of his own in a Namibian hotel bathroom, the only place with enough light, while his Flight of the Phoenix co-stars Jacob Vargas and Scott Michael Campbell held the camera. He improvised by using an umbrella for a cane. Laurie initially believed that James Wilson would be the protagonist of the show after reading the brief description of the character and did not find out that House was the main character until he read the full script of the pilot episode.

After he had watched casting tapes for the pilot episode, Bryan Singer grew frustrated and refused to consider any more British actors because of their flawed American accents. Although Singer compared Laurie's audition tape to an "Osama bin Laden video", he was impressed with Laurie's acting and, not knowing who he was, Singer was fooled by his American accent. He commented on how well the "American actor" was able to grasp the character, not knowing about Laurie's British nationality. Although Laurie's appearance was very different from the way Shore pictured House, when he watched the audition tape, he was equally as impressed as Singer. More famous (in the American market) actors such as Denis Leary, Rob Morrow and Patrick Dempsey were also considered, but Singer, Shore, and executive producers Paul Attanasio and Katie Jacobs all thought Laurie was the best option and decided to cast him for the part. Laurie was the final actor to join the cast of House. After he was chosen for the part, Laurie, whose father Ran Laurie was a doctor himself, said he felt guilty for "being paid more to become a fake version of my own father". While Laurie has used an American accent before in the Stuart Little films, he found it difficult to adopt it for his role, saying that words such as "coronary artery" are particularly tricky to pronounce.

=== Parallels to Sherlock Holmes ===
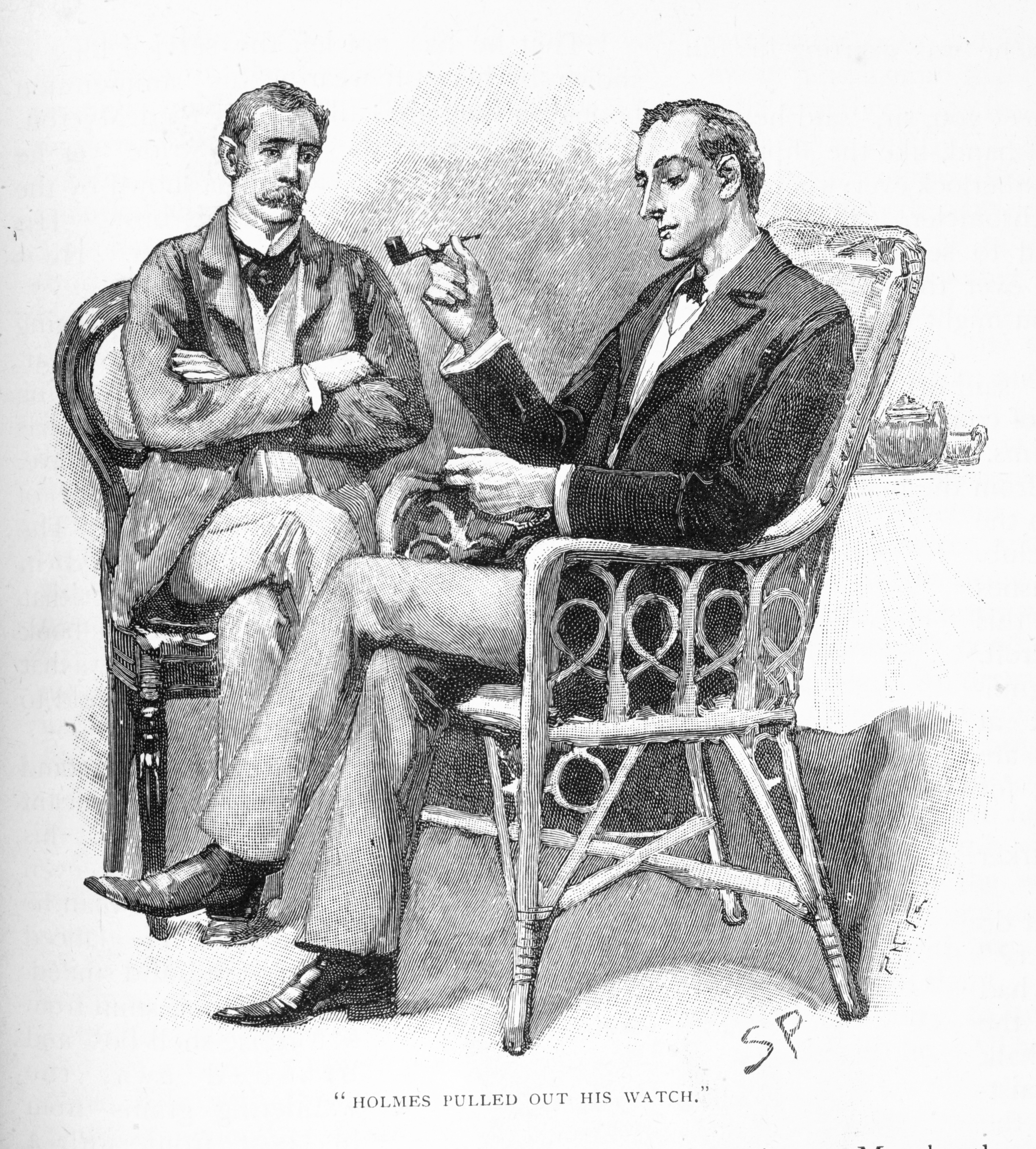
House and Wilson's relationship mirrors Holmes and Watson's (pictured) relationship.

Similarities between House and the famous fictional detective Sherlock Holmes appear throughout the series; Shore explained that he was always a Sherlock Holmes fan, and found the character's indifference to his clients unique. The resemblance is evident in various elements of the series' plot, such as House's reliance on psychology to solve a case, his reluctance to accept cases he does not find interesting and House's home address, 221B Baker Street, which is the same as Holmes'. Other similarities between the two characters are drug use (House battled a Vicodin addiction for years and Holmes was a recreational user of cocaine), successful detoxification (which proves to be only temporary in House's case), playing an instrument (Holmes plays the violin and House plays the guitar, piano, organ and harmonica) and a talent for accurately deducing people's motives and histories from aspects of their personality and appearance.

Shore has also explained that the name "House" is a play on the name "Holmes" via its phonetic similarity to the word "homes". The pun does not extend to the meaning of the names, as the surname "Holmes" actually denotes that its initial bearers lived near or worked with holly or holm-oak trees, such that "Holl[e]y" or "Oak[e]s" would be a more literal equivalent. Both Holmes and House each have one true friend, Dr. John Watson and Dr. James Wilson, respectively. Leonard has said that House and his character were originally intended to play the roles of Holmes and Watson in the series although he believes that House's team has assumed the Watson role. Shore has also said that Dr. House draws inspiration from Dr. Marc Chamberlain, a professor of neurology at the University of Washington, Seattle, and Dr. Joseph Bell (who was a teacher of Arthur Conan Doyle's and thus a chief source of inspiration for the creation of Holmes), who could "walk into a waiting room and diagnose people without speaking to them". In the season two finale "No Reason", House is shot by a man named Jack Moriarty, a name that coincides with Sherlock Holmes' adversary, Professor James Moriarty; likewise, in the fifth season, Wilson uses Irene Adler as the name for an imaginary love interest of House (a teacher by the name of Rebecca Adler was also the first patient Dr. House encounters in the first episode of the series), the same name as a notable female adversary of Holmes.

== Reception ==
Throughout the series' run, the character received positive reviews. Tom Shales of The Washington Post called House "the most electrifying character to hit television in years".

House was featured on several best lists. In 2008, House was voted by BuddyTV second sexiest TV doctor ever, behind Dr. Doug Ross (George Clooney) from ER. TV Overmind named House the best TV character of the last decade. In June 2010, Entertainment Weekly also named him one of the 100 Greatest Characters of the Last 20 Years. He also appeared in Entertainment Weekly's "30 Great TV Doctors and Nurses". He was elected TV's Most Crushworthy Male Doctor over Doug Ross of ER in a poll held by Zap2it. Fox News placed the character among the Best TV Doctors For Surgeon General.

For his portrayal, Hugh Laurie has won various awards, including two Golden Globe Awards for Best Actor in a Television Series – Drama, two Screen Actors Guild Awards for Best Actor from Drama Series, two Satellite Awards for Best Actor in a Television Series – Drama, and two TCA Awards for Individual Achievement in Drama. Laurie has also earned a total of six Primetime Emmy Award nominations for Outstanding Lead Actor in a Drama Series in 2005, 2007, 2008, 2009, 2010, and 2011.

== Bibliography ==
- Holtz, Andrew (2006). The Medical Science of House, M.D.. New York: Berkley Books. ISBN 978-0-425-21230-1.
- Holtz, Andrew (2011). House M.D. vs. Reality: Fact and Fiction in the Hit Television Series. New York: Berkley Books. ISBN 978-0-425-23893-6.
- Hockley, L.; Gardner, L. (2010). House The Wounded Healer on Television: Jungian and Post-Jungian Reflections. Routledge. ISBN 978-0-415-47913-4.
