= House season 3 =

House
- Season 3
- Season 3 DVD cover
- Starring: Hugh Laurie; Lisa Edelstein; Omar Epps; Robert Sean Leonard; Jennifer Morrison; Jesse Spencer
- No. of episodes: 24

Release
- Original network: Fox
- Original release: September 5, 2006 – May 29, 2007

Season chronology
- ← Previous; Season 2 Next → Season 4

The third season of House (also called House, M.D.) aired on FOX from September 5, 2006 to May 29, 2007. Early in the season, House temporarily regains the use of his leg due to ketamine treatment after he was shot in the season two finale. Later in the season, he leaves a stubborn patient in an exam room with a thermometer in his rectum. Because House is unwilling to apologize, the patient, who turns out to be a police detective, starts an investigation around House's Vicodin addiction.

David Morse joined the cast for seven episodes as the detective Michael Tritter. He was cast for the role after working with House creator David Shore on CBS' Hack.

== Cast and characters ==
=== Main cast ===
- Hugh Laurie as Dr. Gregory House
- Lisa Edelstein as Dr. Lisa Cuddy
- Omar Epps as Dr. Eric Foreman
- Robert Sean Leonard as Dr. James Wilson
- Jennifer Morrison as Dr. Allison Cameron
- Jesse Spencer as Dr. Robert Chase

=== Recurring cast ===
- David Morse as Detective Michael Tritter
- Stephanie Venditto as Nurse Brenda Previn
- Kadeem Hardison as lawyer Howard Gemeiner
- Leighton Meester as Ali
- Edward Edwards as Richard McNeil
- Ron Perkins as Dr. Ron Simpson
- Charles S. Dutton as Rodney Foreman
- Kimberly Quinn as Nurse Wendy

=== Guest cast ===
Jane Adams, Erich Anderson, Omar Avila, Jurnee Smollett-Bell, Geoffrey Blake, Tanner Blaze, Ben Bledsoe, Marc Blucas, Mika Boorem, Kacie Borrowman, David Bowe, Paula Cale, Helen Carey, Greg Cipes, Monique Gabriela Curnen, Dabier, Meredith Eaton, Mary Elizabeth Ellis, Shonda Farr, Arabella Field, Colleen Flynn, Lyndsy Fonseca, Thomas Mikal Ford, Patrick Fugit, Carla Gallo, Christopher Gartin, Jason Winston George, Skyler Gisondo, Meta Golding, Meagan Good, Eve Gordon, Joel Grey, Tracy Howe, Carter Jenkins, Dustin Joiner, Heather Kafka, Krista Kalmus, Tory Kittles, Clare Kramer, Deborah Lacey, Nick Lane, John Larroquette, Brian Leckner, Sheryl Lee, Geoffrey Lewis, Braeden Lemasters, Tess Lina, Jodi Long, Donald Sage Mackey, Bailee Madison, Wendy Makkena, Stephan Markle, Dave Matthews, Shyann McClure, Michael Medico, Joel David Moore, Zeb Newman, Jenny O'Hara, Slade Pearce, Piper Perabo, Adina Porter, Kathleen Quinlan, Annie Quinn, Anne Ramsay, Mercedes Renard, Jake Richardson, Tyson Ritter, Jenny Robertson, Alan Rosenberg, Vyto Ruginis, Jessy Schram, Dustin Seavey, Alyssa Shafer, Kurtwood Smith, Tony Spiridakis, Josh Stamberg, Cassi Thomson, Cooper Thornton, Beverly Todd, Mandy June Turpin, Raviv Ullman, Pruitt Taylor Vince, Jascha Washington, Damien Dante Wayans, Katheryn Winnick and Jamison Yang.

== Reception ==
Season three's most-viewed episode was "One Day, One Room", which was watched by almost 27.4 million viewers. An average 19.4 million viewers watched season three of House, making it the seventh most-watched show of the 2006–2007 television season.

Jennifer Morrison and Joel Grey submitted the episode "Informed Consent" for consideration in the categories of Outstanding Supporting Actress in a Drama Series and Outstanding Guest Actor in a Drama Series respectively at the 59th Primetime Emmy Awards. Neither was nominated.

John Larroquette and David Morse submitted the episode "Son of Coma Guy" for consideration in the category of Outstanding Guest Actor in a Drama Series. Morse was nominated. Lisa Edelstein also submitted this episode for consideration in the category of Outstanding Supporting Actress in a Drama Series. She did not receive a nomination.

The episode "Half-Wit" was submitted for consideration in the categories of Outstanding Drama Series, Outstanding Writing for a Drama Series (for Lawrence Kaplow), and Outstanding Lead Actor in a Drama Series (for Hugh Laurie). The series and Laurie received nominations.

Omar Epps submitted the episode "House Training" for consideration in the category of Outstanding Supporting Actor in a Drama Series. He was not nominated.

== Episodes ==
No. overall	No. in season	Title	Directed by	Written by	Original release date	US viewers (millions)
47	1	"Meaning"	Deran Sarafian	Story by : Russel Friend & Garrett Lerner & Lawrence Kaplow & David Shore; Teleplay by : Lawrence Kaplow & David Shore	September 5, 2006	19.65
House has recovered from his gunshot wounds and is back at work, taking on two cases simultaneously: Richard (Edward Edwards), paralyzed after brain cancer surgery eight years ago, who drove himself on his motorized wheelchair headfirst into a swimming pool, and Caren (Clare Kramer), a young woman paralyzed from the neck down after a yoga session. As House begins to diagnose and treat them, the team notices a distinct change in his attitude toward his patients. Final diagnosis: Addison's disease caused by hypothalamic dysregulation from brain surgery (Richard) and Scurvy (Caren)
48	2	"Cane and Able"	Daniel Sackheim	Story by : Russel Friend & Garrett Lerner & Lawrence Kaplow & David Shore; Teleplay by : Russel Friend & Garrett Lerner	September 12, 2006	15.22
Seven-year-old Clancy (Skyler Gisondo) is admitted to the hospital with rectal bleeding, claiming alien abduction. The team runs tests, but when they get inconsistent and contradictory results from the same tests, in addition to finding a metal object in his neck, they are forced to give Clancy's testimony a little more credence. Amidst this, Cuddy and Wilson struggle with the fallout from the decision not to tell House the truth about his last case, thinking he will learn some humility, and Cameron is outraged at their actions when she finds out about the patient. When a frustrated House gives up on the boy, Cuddy is forced to re-think her decision to hold back the truth. Final diagnosis: Chimerism
49	3	"Informed Consent"	Laura Innes	David Foster	September 19, 2006	13.67
House's new patient is Ezra Powell (Joel Grey), a renowned medical research pioneer who collapses in his lab. House puts Ezra through diagnostic rigors, but the team is unable to come up with a conclusive diagnosis and Ezra's health continues to deteriorate. Ezra ultimately demands the team help him end his life, but each member has divergent opinions on the morality of helping Ezra die, especially since the possibility of a cure is still in question. Meanwhile, Ali (Leighton Meester), the teenage daughter of a clinic patient, has developed a disturbing crush on House. Final diagnosis: Congestive heart failure secondary to senile AA-type cardiac amyloidosis
50	4	"Lines in the Sand"	Newton Thomas Sigel	David Hoselton	September 26, 2006	14.52
House takes the case of Adam (Braeden Lemasters), a 10-year-old severely autistic boy, who screams loudly for no apparent reason. Cuddy makes a minor change to House's office and he refuses to use it until it is returned to its original state; thus, he finds himself wandering the hospital in need of a temporary office. Meanwhile, Ali (Leighton Meester) still has a crush on House and is becoming a nuisance. Final diagnosis: Baylisascaris procyonis (Adam) and Coccidioidomycosis (Ali)
51	5	"Fools for Love"	David Platt	Peter Blake	October 31, 2006	14.18
House takes the case of a young woman (Jurnee Smollett) who is rushed to the hospital with problems breathing and severe stomach pain, after she and her husband (Raviv Ullman) are robbed. But when her husband collapses, the team believes the couple's illnesses are related. Meanwhile, clinic patient Michael Tritter causes problems for House. Final diagnosis: Hereditary angioedema
52	6	"Que Será Será"	Deran Sarafian	Thomas L. Moran	November 7, 2006	16.11
An obese man (Pruitt Taylor Vince) is found in a coma after a fire accident and is admitted to Princeton-Plainsboro. Upon waking up, he demands to be discharged, refusing to be tested for any disease possibly caused by his weight. Final diagnosis: Small cell lung carcinoma
53	7	"Son of Coma Guy"	Dan Attias	Doris Egan	November 14, 2006	14.60
House decides to awaken a patient in a vegetative state (John Larroquette) so he can question the man regarding the family history of his son (Zeb Newman), who may have a genetic condition, and the father is the only living relative. Meanwhile, Wilson confronts House about the stolen prescription as Tritter approaches Cameron, Chase, and Foreman in an attempt to divide the team and reveal their loyalties. Final diagnosis: MERRF syndrome
54	8	"Whac-A-Mole"	Daniel Sackheim	Pamela Davis	November 21, 2006	15.20
House's newest patient is 18-year-old Jack (Patrick Fugit), brought to the hospital after experiencing a heart attack and massive vomiting. Jack has been the sole parent to his younger brother and sister since their parents died. After a brief review of his file, House thinks he has got the diagnosis, seals it in an envelope and turns the process into a game, challenging Cameron, Foreman and Chase to figure it out on their own. Meanwhile, in an attempt to extract a confession, Tritter makes it impossible for Wilson to practice medicine, driving a wedge between the two friends. Final diagnosis: Chronic granulomatous disease
55	9	"Finding Judas"	Deran Sarafian	Sara Hess	November 28, 2006	17.31
House and the team take on the case of Alice (Alyssa Shafer), a young girl with pancreatitis. Since her divorced parents cannot agree on how to proceed with her treatment and will not let House bully them into making a decision, House's only option is to take them to court and let a judge rule on the matter. Meanwhile, House's reduced access to Vicodin is beginning to take its toll and he asks Cuddy for more, but instead of writing a prescription, she strictly rations his pills. Final diagnosis: Erythropoietic protoporphyria
56	10	"Merry Little Christmas"	Tony To	Liz Friedman	December 12, 2006	16.13
Wilson has a Christmas present for House: he and Detective Tritter have struck a deal and House has three days to accept it. Cuddy receives a patient (Kacie Borrowman) afflicted with dwarfism, who has a variety of symptoms and is recovering from a recently collapsed lung. Cuddy is eventually forced to make a difficult and potentially life-threatening choice between her patient and House's well-being. Final diagnosis: Langerhans cell histiocytosis
57	11	"Words and Deeds"	Daniel Sackheim	Leonard Dick	January 9, 2007	17.78
House is forced to respond in court to the criminal charges against him regarding illegal possession of narcotics, and the judge sets a date for a preliminary hearing. Cuddy insists that House apologize to Tritter; meanwhile, the most recent case at the hospital is a firefighter (Tory Kittles) suffering from disorientation and fluctuating body temperatures. Because of misinterpreted information, the firefighter is eventually forced to make a decision to undergo a radical brain treatment which will have a serious effect on his life. His brother (Jason Winston George) takes care of him. Final diagnosis: Spinal meningioma
58	12	"One Day, One Room"	Juan J. Campanella	David Shore	January 30, 2007	27.34
House beats the drug charges and is back at the hospital after a short stint in rehab. Tired of House's disdain for patients, Cuddy turns his clinic duty into a game, with the stakes raised to a level that speaks to House: challenge. When he encounters Eve (Katheryn Winnick), who is tested positive for an STD and admits she has very recently been raped, she refuses to be treated by anyone but House. Meanwhile, Cameron encounters a homeless man (Geoffrey Lewis) with a critical condition and a very specific request from her. Final diagnosis: Chlamydia and pregnancy due to rape (Eve), lung cancer (homeless man)
59	13	"Needle in a Haystack"	Peter O'Fallon	David Foster	February 6, 2007	24.88
16-year-old Stevie Lipa (Jake Richardson) is admitted to Princeton-Plainsboro with a serious respiratory condition and internal bleeding. He is assigned to House, but he is busy fulfilling a dare given to him by Cuddy. When it's revealed that Stevie is Romani and the team encounters troubles with his parents, Foreman is forced to ask Stevie to lie directly to his parents, risking his medical license. Final diagnosis: Undigested toothpick
60	14	"Insensitive"	Deran Sarafian	Matthew V. Lewis	February 13, 2007	25.99
A girl (Mika Boorem) with CIPA, a rare condition in which the sufferer cannot feel pain, gets in a car accident. Once her testing is done, she begins developing high fevers with multiple seizures and is rapidly deteriorating. Final diagnosis: Fish tapeworm causing Vitamin B12 deficiency
61	15	"Half-Wit"	Katie Jacobs	Lawrence Kaplow	March 6, 2007	24.40
A brain-damaged musical savant (Dave Matthews) has seizures despite being on anti-seizure medications. When his team learns that House has entered himself for brain cancer treatment, they attempt to comfort him, but House simply turns them away. Final diagnosis: Takayasu's arteritis
62	16	"Top Secret"	Deran Sarafian	Thomas L. Moran	March 27, 2007	20.80
House treats a U.S. Marine John Kelley (Marc Blucas) returning from Iraq, who has symptoms consistent with Gulf War Syndrome. However, after House has a dream about the Marine despite having never met him before, the case becomes more complicated, alongside a physical problem that House has to overcome. Final diagnosis: Hereditary hemorrhagic telangiectasia
63	17	"Fetal Position"	Matt Shakman	Russel Friend & Garrett Lerner	April 3, 2007	20.35
Celebrity photographer Emma Sloan (Anne Ramsay), who is pregnant, is brought to the hospital after suffering a stroke in the middle of a photo shoot. Although Emma's condition initially stabilizes, her health takes a turn for the worse when her kidneys fail. Emma, who had miscarriages in the past and feels this is her last opportunity to have a child, is more concerned about her baby's well-being than her own. Meanwhile, the secret relationship between Cameron and Chase is exposed to Foreman and Cuddy, and House makes extravagant plans to take a much-needed vacation. Final diagnosis: Maternal mirror syndrome (Emma) and Congenital cystic adenomatoid malformation (Emma's baby)
64	18	"Airborne"	Elodie Keene	David Hoselton	April 10, 2007	21.57
House and Cuddy face a widespread outbreak on their plane back from a symposium in Singapore, while Wilson and the rest of the team treat a 58-year old woman (Jenny O'Hara) with constant seizures who is hiding secrets about her lifestyle. Final diagnosis: Decompression sickness (Peng), Methyl bromide poisoning (Fran) and hysterical conversion (Other passengers)
65	19	"Act Your Age"	Daniel Sackheim	Sara Hess	April 17, 2007	22.41
A six-year-old girl (Bailee Madison) suffers ailments expected in much older patients. Tensions mount between Chase and Cameron, leading House to intentionally assign them to the same tasks, including investigating the young girl's home, where they find something possibly incriminating on the girl's father. Another clue presents itself in the girl's 8-year-old brother's sexual precocity. Final diagnosis: Precocious puberty due to externally applied testosterone
66	20	"House Training"	Paul McCrane	Doris Egan	April 24, 2007	20.81
A scam artist (Monique Gabriela Curnen) loses her ability to make decisions. While House and the team struggle to find the underlying cause, the case becomes personal for Foreman when he recommends and administers total body radiation that destroys her immune system. Final diagnosis: Staphylococcus aureus infection
67	21	"Family"	David Straiton	Liz Friedman	May 1, 2007	21.13
A 14-year-old leukemia patient's (Jascha Washington) only hope of survival is a bone marrow transplant from his younger brother (Dabier), but when he gets sick, the team must race against time to save both siblings. Meanwhile, Foreman must deal with the consequences of the previous case. Final diagnosis: Histoplasmosis
68	22	"Resignation"	Martha Mitchell	Pamela Davis	May 8, 2007	21.36
Speculation over Foreman's resignation continues, while a young woman named Addie (Lyndsy Fonseca) is admitted after bleeding from the mouth during martial arts practice and House and Wilson are secretly concerned about each other. Final diagnosis: Unnamed infection from Arteriovenous fistula in small intestine secondary to ingestion of chemical drain cleaner in suicide attempt
69	23	"The Jerk"	Daniel Sackheim	Leonard Dick	May 15, 2007	21.19
House meets his match in the form of Nate (Nick Lane), an obnoxious 16-year-old chess prodigy with intense head pain and behavioral issues, who manages to annoy and offend every member of the team during his course of treatment. Meanwhile, Foreman's frustration with House reaches a new level when he believes House sabotaged his job interview with another hospital. Final diagnosis: Haemochromatosis
70	24	"Human Error"	Katie Jacobs	Thomas L. Moran & Lawrence Kaplow	May 29, 2007	17.23
House and the team take on the case of a young woman (Mercedes Renard) who, along with her husband, is rescued at sea en route from Cuba in a desperate attempt to personally see House and get a diagnosis for her illness. During her stay in the hospital, she develops a new symptom: her heart stops – but she miraculously keeps talking. Foreman prepares for his last day at Princeton-Plainsboro Teaching Hospital. Final diagnosis: Congenital heart defect (infected third coronary artery ostium)

== DVD releases ==
Set details				Special features
Country	North America	United Kingdom	Australia	Bonus Featurettes: House Soundtrack Session with Band from TV; Anatomy of an Episode: The Jerk; Blood, Needles and Body Parts: The House Prop Department; Open House: The Production Office; Blooper Reel; Episode Commentary; "Half-Wit" from the show's Creative Team
# episodes	24			Bonus Featurettes: House Soundtrack Session with Band from TV; Anatomy of an Episode: The Jerk; Blood, Needles and Body Parts: The House Prop Department; Open House: The Production Office; Blooper Reel; Episode Commentary; "Half-Wit" from the show's Creative Team
Aspect ratio	1.78:1			Bonus Featurettes: House Soundtrack Session with Band from TV; Anatomy of an Episode: The Jerk; Blood, Needles and Body Parts: The House Prop Department; Open House: The Production Office; Blooper Reel; Episode Commentary; "Half-Wit" from the show's Creative Team
Running time	1050 minutes	1008 minutes	1014 minutes	Bonus Featurettes: House Soundtrack Session with Band from TV; Anatomy of an Episode: The Jerk; Blood, Needles and Body Parts: The House Prop Department; Open House: The Production Office; Blooper Reel; Episode Commentary; "Half-Wit" from the show's Creative Team
Audio	Dolby Digital 5.1			Bonus Featurettes: House Soundtrack Session with Band from TV; Anatomy of an Episode: The Jerk; Blood, Needles and Body Parts: The House Prop Department; Open House: The Production Office; Blooper Reel; Episode Commentary; "Half-Wit" from the show's Creative Team
Subtitles	English, Spanish	—N/a	none	Bonus Featurettes: House Soundtrack Session with Band from TV; Anatomy of an Episode: The Jerk; Blood, Needles and Body Parts: The House Prop Department; Open House: The Production Office; Blooper Reel; Episode Commentary; "Half-Wit" from the show's Creative Team
# of discs	5	6		Bonus Featurettes: House Soundtrack Session with Band from TV; Anatomy of an Episode: The Jerk; Blood, Needles and Body Parts: The House Prop Department; Open House: The Production Office; Blooper Reel; Episode Commentary; "Half-Wit" from the show's Creative Team
Region	1 (NTSC)	2 (PAL)	2, 4 (PAL)	Bonus Featurettes: House Soundtrack Session with Band from TV; Anatomy of an Episode: The Jerk; Blood, Needles and Body Parts: The House Prop Department; Open House: The Production Office; Blooper Reel; Episode Commentary; "Half-Wit" from the show's Creative Team
Rating	NOT RATED	15	M	Bonus Featurettes: House Soundtrack Session with Band from TV; Anatomy of an Episode: The Jerk; Blood, Needles and Body Parts: The House Prop Department; Open House: The Production Office; Blooper Reel; Episode Commentary; "Half-Wit" from the show's Creative Team
Release dates	August 21, 2007	November 19, 2007	September 2007	Bonus Featurettes: House Soundtrack Session with Band from TV; Anatomy of an Episode: The Jerk; Blood, Needles and Body Parts: The House Prop Department; Open House: The Production Office; Blooper Reel; Episode Commentary; "Half-Wit" from the show's Creative Team
