= David Foster (writer) =

American television writer and producer

- Born: United States
- Occupations: Television writer, producer, medical doctor
- Years active: 1995–present

David Foster is an American television writer, producer and medical doctor best known for working as a writer/producer on the Fox medical drama series House.

== Medical career ==
Foster graduated from Harvard Medical School in 1995. He attended school with Neal Baer, a pediatrician who would eventually become the executive producer of Law & Order: Special Victims Unit. As a doctor he worked at Beth Israel Deaconess Medical Center and the Harvard School of Public Health listening to patient's stories and diagnose uncommon illnesses, a skill which he would later utilize as a writer on House.

== Television career ==
Foster would eventually move into television writing through Neal Baer, who hired him to freelance-write an episode of Law & Order: SVU entitled "Parts". The producers of House were impressed by his credentials and hired him as a consulting producer during the show's first season. Since then he has served as a writer and producer and was promoted to co-executive producer at the beginning of the seventh season.

=== House episodes ===
1. "DNR" (1.09)
2. "Mob Rules" (with John Mankiewicz) (1.15)
3. "TB or Not TB" (2.05)
4. "All In" (2.17)
5. "Informed Consent" (3.03)
6. "Needle in a Haystack" (3.13)
7. "Mirror Mirror" (4.05)
8. "House's Head" (with Peter Blake, Doris Egan, Russel Friend, and Garrett Lerner) (4.15)
9. "Wilson's Heart" (with Peter Blake, Russel Friend, and Garrett Lerner) (4.16)
10. "Birthmarks" (with Doris Egan) (5.04)
11. "Big Baby" (with Lawrence Kaplow) (5.13)
12. "Locked In" (with Russel Friend and Garrett Lerner) (5.19)
13. "Broken" (with Russel Friend, Garrett Lerner, and David Shore) (6.01 / 6.02)
14. "Wilson" (6.10)
15. "Baggage" (with Doris Egan) (6.21)
16. "Unplanned Parenthood" (7.05)
17. "Last Temptation" (with Liz Friedman) (7.19)
18. "Transplant" (with Liz Friedman) (8.02)
19. "Nobody's Fault" (with Russel Friend and Garrett Lerner) (8.11)
20. "'Holding On" (with Russel Friend and Garrett Lerner) (8.21)

== Awards and nominations ==
In 2010, Foster won a Writers Guild of America Award for "Broken", an episode of House, which he shared with Russel Friend, Garrett Lerner and David Shore.
