= Michael Tritter =

Fictional detective on the TV series House

- House character
- First appearance: "Fools for Love"; October 31, 2006
- Last appearance: "Words and Deeds"; January 9, 2007
- Created by: Peter Blake
- Portrayed by: David Morse

In-universe information
- Occupation: Police detective

Michael Tritter is a recurring fictional character in the medical drama series House, portrayed by David Morse. He is the main antagonist of the third season, which ran between 2006 and 2007. Tritter is a police detective, who tries to get Dr. Gregory House (Hugh Laurie) to apologize for leaving him in an examination room with a thermometer in his rectum. After House refuses to apologize, Tritter researches House's background and discovers his Vicodin addiction. Tritter turns people close to House against him and forces House to go to rehab. When the case ultimately comes to court, the judge sentences House to one night in jail, for contempt of court, and to finish his rehabilitation, telling Tritter that she believes House is not the drug addict he tried to make him out to be.

The character was created as somebody who could go "toe-to-toe" with House. Morse, who had never seen the show before, was unimpressed after familiarizing himself with the show, but the excited reaction of his friends to the opportunity convinced him to take the role. Initial critical responses to the character were mostly positive, but critics later felt that the six-episode Tritter story arc became boring. Morse, though, was praised for his portrayal and received a nomination for the Primetime Emmy Award for Outstanding Guest Actor in a Drama Series for his appearance in the episode "Finding Judas". Morse stated in a 2006 TV Guide interview that, although he had discussed it with writers of the show, bringing the character back on the show would be "practically impossible".

== Storyline ==
Tritter first appears in the episode "Fools for Love", the fifth episode of the third season. His character is a police detective who suffers from a severe irritation in the area of his groin, which he believes to be caused by a sexually transmitted disease; he becomes a patient of the walk-in clinic. Although House diagnoses Tritter with dry skin, a common side effect of the nicotine gum that Tritter is chewing, Tritter demands that a sample be tested. House declines on the grounds that he has "already met this month's quota" for indulging "stubborn idiots". After Tritter causes House to trip, the doctor feigns acquiescence, but insists he has to take Tritter's temperature rectally due to the nicotine gum. After inserting the thermometer, House leaves the room, with no intention of returning. Tritter later complains about his treatment to House's boss, Lisa Cuddy (Lisa Edelstein), saying that he would rather "beat the crap out of" House than sue him; however, House refuses to apologize. Later that night, Tritter pulls House over for a traffic violation and arrests him after finding Vicodin pills in his pocket.

In the next episode, "Que Sera Sera", Tritter searches House's apartment and finds a large quantity of Vicodin pills and two apparently forged prescriptions that bear the name of House's friend James Wilson (Robert Sean Leonard). During "Son of Coma Guy" and "Whac-A-Mole", Tritter pressures Wilson and members of House's diagnostic team to testify against him, but they all refuse. In "Finding Judas", Cuddy finds Tritter spending his day off looking through the hospital's log for evidence against House. She accuses him of not having a life and "personalizing every slight". Tritter responds that "nobody [at the hospital] is innocent", as everyone allows House to treat patients despite knowing of his Vicodin addiction and that it takes a police detective to uncover what the doctors are deliberately hiding. At the end of the episode, Wilson visits Tritter and indicates his willingness to testify.

In "Merry Little Christmas", Tritter and Wilson work out a deal to allow House to continue practicing medicine if he pleads guilty and spends two months in rehab. Meanwhile, House uses a dead patient's name to obtain oxycodone pills as a replacement for Vicodin, but nearly overdoses on the drug as he is unaccustomed to its effects. When House visits Tritter early the next morning to agree to the deal, Tritter says the deal is off, after going through the pharmacy's log and reading that House signed for a dead man's drugs.

In "Words and Deeds", during the final days leading up to House's court case, House realizes the severity of the situation and finally apologizes to Tritter. When Tritter refuses to accept the apology, House goes into rehab, putting on a show for Tritter and the judge, but Tritter cites his experiences with addicts as evidence House has not changed. The judge tells Tritter that she does not believe House to be the drug dealer that Tritter tried to show him to be and orders Tritter to move on after House is exonerated due to Cuddy committing perjury. Just before the bailiff escorts House out of the courtroom, Tritter tells him "Good luck. I hope I'm wrong about you."

== Personality ==
Tritter himself is essentially House without the sense of humor, but that doesn't make him any less right in his assessment of House as bully.

— Alan Sepinwall

The main antagonist of the third season, Tritter is a "stubborn", "vengeful", and extremely determined police detective. According to David Morse, the offensive thermometer incident in "Fools for Love" made it easy for Tritter to stand up to House; as House's equal, Tritter "gets who House is on all levels and can really shake his foundation". Tritter's experiences with drug addicts color his view of House, and he becomes so obsessed with House that, according to executive producer Katie Jacobs, the story arc turns into "a battle of egos" between them. The character shows a manipulative streak when he forms a plan to coerce each member of House's team to testify separately in "Finding Judas". Robert Bianco of USA Today described Tritter as an initially "legitimately, if belligerently, aggrieved adversary" character who later morphs into "some kind of insane supercop, tearing his way through the hospital and the Constitution at will".

== Creation and casting ==
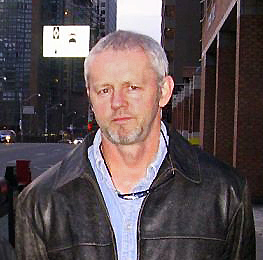
David Morse, who portrayed Tritter, in 2005

Tritter was created as someone to go "toe-to-toe" with House. The producers envisioned a character with an inner strength, intelligence, and single-mindedness to match that of House. In 2006, House creator David Shore contacted actor David Morse, with whom he had previously worked on Hack, for a guest-starring episode arc on the show. According to Ellen Gray of the Philadelphia Daily News, Morse's earlier portrayals of "scary" cops (in 16 Blocks and Hack) helped him clinch the role.

Morse was unfamiliar with the show. After watching several House episodes, he was surprised that the show had a strong audience with "[such] a total jerk" as the lead character. It was not until Morse told a few long-time friends about the job offer that their enthusiastic reaction convinced him to take the role. Katie Jacobs, executive producer of House, was impressed by Morse's performance. In a 2006 TV Guide interview, Morse said that, although he discussed the possibility with House writers, it would be "practically impossible" to get the character to return in any later seasons.

== Reception ==
Initial responses to the character were mostly positive. Maureen Ryan of the Chicago Tribune declared Tritter the best male villain of the fall of 2006. Lisa Edelstein, who portrays Lisa Cuddy on House, named David Morse as one of her favorite House guest stars, saying that he did a great job portraying the character. Barbara Barnett from Blog Critics Magazine and Charles McGrath of The New York Times compared Tritter to Inspector Javert of Les Misérables, and Alynda Wheat from Entertainment Weekly stated that Tritter annoyed House more than any other character, surpassing other antagonists such as Amber Volakis (Anne Dudek), Stacy Warner (Sela Ward), and Lucas Douglas (Michael Weston). Variety's Stuart Levine considered Tritter a "worthy foe" for House.

However, after about the fourth episode and the many troubles he was causing the people in House's life, we were bored. This story seemed to drag on forever and, in the meantime, there weren't that many great medical cases to fill in the gap.

— Staci Krause, IGN

However, the continued character arc increasingly bored critics. Staci Krause of IGN found the first few episodes of Season 3, in which House recovers from being shot, more interesting. In a review of "Que Sera Sera", Entertainment Weekly's Michelle Kung noted that while David Morse is a fine actor, "his cop is so ridiculously one-note and revenge-bent that his scenes are often just excruciating to sit through." In a review for "Fools for Love", Sara Morrison of Television Without Pity doubted that Tritter's revenge on House was worth his time and aggravation, and later called the Tritter arc an "insane quest for ass-thermometer justice". The Star-Ledger's Alan Sepinwall stated that "pitting House against a comedy-impaired cop was both dull and not a fair fight".

The show's fans had shown dislike for other antagonists with multi-episode guest-starring arcs, and critics suspected that Tritter's character would receive similar disdain. The conclusion of the storyline, and Tritter's departure from the show, were described by USA Today critic Robert Bianco as a Christmas gift for fans of the show. Morse jokingly stated after his departure that various fans had told him of their hate for Tritter after what the character had done to Dr. House.

Morse, however, gained mainly positive responses to his portrayal of Tritter. Alan Sepinwall called Morse a "superb actor", and Maureen Ryan stated that Morse's "understated performance" made Tritter all the more scary. Zap2it's Daniel Fienberg regarded Morse as "one of our very best character actors". Cynthia Littleton of Variety, who already considered Morse's work in St. Elsewhere Emmy-worthy, was glad that Morse's submission of the episode "Finding Judas" for a 2007 Emmy Awards consideration was accepted in the category of "Outstanding Guest Actor in a Drama Series". The award eventually went to John Goodman for Studio 60 on the Sunset Strip.
