= Lines in the Sand (House) =

- House episode
- Episode no.: Season 3 Episode 4
- Directed by: Newton Thomas Sigel
- Written by: David Hoselton
- Original air date: September 26, 2006

Guest appearances
- Braeden Lemasters as Adam Kelvey; Geoffrey Blake as Dominic Kelvey; Heather Kafka as Sarah Kelvey; Leighton Meester as Ali; Ron Perkins as Dr. Ron Simpson; Stephanie Venditto as Nurse Brenda Previn

Episode chronology
← Previous "Informed Consent"	Next → "Fools for Love"
- House season 3

"Lines in the Sand" is the fourth episode of the third season of House and the fiftieth episode overall. The episode aired on Fox on September 26, 2006.

== Plot ==
=== Adam ===
Adam, who is autistic, is learning shapes and words in his backyard. His father, Don, is trying very hard to show Adam words, but Adam seems more interested in drawing lines on his chalkboard. While eating his lunch, Adam gags as if choking, grabs at his chest, and screams loudly.

While House and his team are doing the differential diagnosis for Adam, he notices that the blood-stained carpet in his office has been replaced. He goes to complain to Cuddy, who has no intentions of returning the carpet. As a result, House refuses to return to his office. Cuddy suggests working in the Clinic, but he begins to work in other people's offices during the course of the episode. While House is complaining to Cuddy, the rest of House's team tries to strap Adam down and get him into an MRI machine. It takes time because Adam must first finish a video game, which his father insists that the team does not want to interrupt. After the MRI, Chase and Cameron go to Adam's house to run tests. Foreman tells House that all the tests are negative. House then meets with his team in the clinic and orders his team to get a stool sample. Before the team can take the sample, Adam has another fit and coughs up fluid from his lungs. House moves into Wilson's office after he is evicted from the clinic by Cuddy, and Wilson is not happy. The team finds a heart problem, but House brushes this off and continues with his diagnosis. In the end, Foreman is instructed to do a biopsy of his lung.

Foreman consults Wilson, who recommends taking a biopsy of the lymph node under Adam's arm to look for cancer. Foreman tricks Wilson into doing the biopsy in order to avoid dealing with Adam himself. The biopsy finds liver cells under Adam's arm. Another differential in Wilson's office suggests that Adam may have suffered liver damage, leading to its cells flowing into the lymphatic system. House then moves to Cuddy's office for the differential and is discussing the presence of calcium carbonate in Adam's stool when he is evicted by Cuddy again, with the news that Adam is in a cardiac intensive care unit. Adam is stabilized, and House considers the possibility of pica, believing that Adam may have been eating non-food items since calcium carbonate is found in blackboard chalk. He orders his staff to get samples from the house. While searching the backyard, Foreman finds jimson weed and suspects that might be the source of the problem. However, House is skeptical.

When Adam's eyeball moves awkwardly, a surgery is scheduled for a possible tumor. House continues with the differential, this time in the hospital chapel. They decide to do a CT scan of Adam's head for tumors, and to remove the eye if the CT scan does not reveal anything.

Sitting amongst Adam's toys, House finally makes a connection. He shows that the boy has roundworms floating in his eye; they have also infested his heart, lungs, and liver. Adam picked up the parasites by eating sand contaminated with raccoon feces from his sandbox. The lines he kept drawing were actually the worms that blocked his vision. House orders anti-parasitic medication and laser eye therapy to clear up the problems.

Wilson notes that House's apparent interest and connection with his autistic patient indicates a possible diagnosis of Asperger syndrome in House himself, but soon dismisses this idea and concludes that House is simply a jerk.

As Adam and his parents are leaving, House observes them from a nearby seat with Wilson. He comments on their lack of genuine joy, inventing an arbitrary happiness scale and giving them a relatively low score. He reasons that this is because they are dreading the return to their heavily regimented lifestyle with an autistic child. As they stop to thank House, Adam holds eye contact with House before giving him his handheld video game, a most unusual gesture for an autistic child. Upon seeing the reaction of the parent, Wilson gives them a 'ten' on House's scale. The old carpet is laid back down in House's office exposing the blood stain, and Cameron says to House, "All change is bad? It's not true, you know."

=== Ali ===
While House is treating Adam, the seventeen-year-old daughter of a clinic patient in the last episode has developed a crush on him. She tracks House down by visiting the clinic, flirting heavily with him and exposing her breasts in exam. Cuddy tells House that Ali (Leighton Meester) is stalking him and that she will call security. Later, House finds Ali sitting on his motorcycle. She continues flirting, undeterred by earlier unanswered calls. However, Cuddy interrupts their exchange again and sends Ali away. Even though House is flattered by Ali's feelings for him, he really is not interested in her; however, he does not want to hurt her feelings. Cuddy lies to House, trying to get him away from Ali, but then cracks under House's pressure and reveals that Ali is locked in her office and House should talk her down and send her off for good. House observes Ali crying milky tears. Having recently experienced an earthquake in Fresno, he deceptively explains to her that she likely inhaled a fungal spore – Coccidioides immitis in her brain, which was released during the earthquake, lying about the disease's symptoms to explain away her obsession; milky tears and loss of inhibition are not symptoms of this particular infection.

In his final speech to Ali in the episode in an attempt to scare her away, House indirectly quotes the famous romantic speech at the end of Casablanca: "We will always have Fresno".
