= All In (House) =

- House episode
- Episode no.: Season 2 Episode 17
- Directed by: Fred Gerber
- Written by: David Foster
- Original air date: April 11, 2006

Guest appearances
- Laura Allen as Sarah Alston; Mackenzie Astin as Alan Alston; Carter Page as Ian Alston; Al Espinosa as Dr. Wells; Michelle Harrison as Nicole Ballard; Purva Bedi as Ian's teacher

Episode chronology
| ← Previous "Safe" | Next → "Sleeping Dogs Lie" |
- House season 2

"All In" is the seventeenth episode of the second season of House, which premiered on Fox on April 11, 2006.

== Plot ==
During a field trip in a museum exhibit about the human body, six-year-old Ian Alston is found to have bloody diarrhea. Meanwhile, at a charity casino night at Princeton-Plainsboro, House, Wilson, and Cuddy are engaged in a game of Texas hold 'em poker when Cuddy receives the news about her new patient. She dismisses it as dehydration and gastroenteritis, but House, recognizing the symptoms and thinking this could be more than what she suggested, decides to drop out of the game (folding a pair of aces to Cuddy's bluff) and take the case behind her back.

With his suspicion, House tests Ian's coordination by asking him to reach out and grab his cane, which takes Ian multiple grasps until he actually touches the cane. House concludes Ian has ataxia and begins to assume Ian has the same disease as a former patient from twelve years ago, 73-year-old Esther Doyle, who died under House's care and was never correctly diagnosed. House then drags Cameron, Foreman, and Chase out of the party to perform a differential diagnosis. Drawing up a list of all of Esther's symptoms, House is able to predict what will happen to Ian next, as well as how long it will take him to get there.

House first suspects it is Erdheim–Chester disease and orders a colonoscopy, but tests are negative. House, knowing the next symptom that will develop is kidney damage, orders a kidney biopsy, which turns out to be negative. The rest of the team, annoyed, tell House that all Ian has is a stomachache due to some bad food. But after discovering Ian's urine catheter bag full of brown urine, they realize that Ian's kidneys are indeed failing and that they are already far too damaged to be saved. The team is forced to do another differential diagnosis, however many of the diseases proposed, House already tested for twelve years ago.

Next the team postulates it is lymphoma and tries more tests. To keep Cuddy busy and off the case, House calls Wilson and has him stall her in the poker game. However, tests are negative for lymphoma. Unable to determine what disease afflicts the two people, House orders immediate treatment to protect Ian's liver, which was the next symptom Esther developed. His plan succeeds and Ian does not develop liver damage, but instead skips the next two symptoms and goes into respiratory distress.

Thinking it could be cancer, House includes Wilson in the differential. Wilson suggests Kawasaki disease, but before the team begins tests, they discover a mass in his heart. Postulating that Ian, being younger than Esther, has a stronger immune system and can last longer while under assault from this unknown disease, House orders a heart biopsy on Ian. Wilson, recognizing House's ongoing grapple with Esther's case, warns him not to become obsessed, using Moby Dick as an allusion.

During the biopsy, as House collects the sample from Ian's heart, the catheter induces cardiac arrest in Ian, prompting an enraged Cuddy to pull House off the case and ban him and his team from performing any more tests on Ian. However, House refuses to give up, stating that they still have the mass obtained from the biopsy and can perform the tests on that.

The team suggests seven likely diseases but only has enough tumor mass to perform three tests. First the team tests for histiocytosis, but it is negative. Next they test for tuberous sclerosis but that is negative also. Desperate and with only one remaining test, House wanders the hospital trying to think of his next move, when he hears from Wilson that he won the poker tournament. Wilson won only because he had kept his hole cards, two aces, hidden the entire game, prompting House to have an epiphany. He realizes that the disease also remained a secret until the end because they biopsied the colon before the disease had reached the Gastrointestinal tract.

House then orders his team to perform the final test on the first disease suggested: Erdheim–Chester disease. In dismay, the team pleads, telling him they cannot waste their sample on a test for a disease they know he's negative for. House explains his reasoning about the disease not reaching the GI tract and orders the test anyway. The once-skeptical team is pleased when the test turns out positive, Ian is saved, and House finally discovers what killed Esther. The episode ends with House and Wilson playing poker and joking as they did in the beginning of the episode.
