= Half-Wit =

- House episode
- Episode no.: Season 3 Episode 15
- Directed by: Katie Jacobs
- Written by: Lawrence Kaplow
- Original air date: March 6, 2007

Guest appearances
- Dave Matthews as Patrick Obyedkov; Kurtwood Smith as Dr. Obyedkov

Episode chronology
← Previous "Insensitive"	Next → "Top Secret"
- House season 3

"Half-Wit" is the fifteenth episode of the third season of House and premiered on the Fox network on March 6, 2007. Grammy-winning singer/songwriter Dave Matthews guest stars in the episode as Patrick, a savant and piano prodigy who comes under the care of Dr. House (Hugh Laurie) for a rare movement disorder. Dr. House also is suspected to have cancer by his staff. Also appearing is Kurtwood Smith. The episode marks the directorial debut of executive producer Katie Jacobs. The patient in the episode closely resembles real world savant Derek Paravicini.

== Plot ==
Patrick Obyedkov, a respected pianist, suffers a painful involuntary muscle contraction in his left hand during a piano concert. The case attracts the attention of Gregory House, who learns from Patrick's father that Patrick suffered severe brain damage from a bus accident that also killed his mother. House is intrigued as to why Patrick, who had no musical training at the time of the accident, could suddenly play the piano after suffering a severe injury.

While trying to deduce the origin of the brain rewiring responsible for Patrick mysteriously gaining musical abilities, House and his team must stop the deadly bleeding that is quickly threatening his life. Patrick's condition worsens, and House presents a difficult option to Patrick's father: either perform a hemispherectomy, allowing Patrick to live normally but not play the piano, or to continue as he is and never live a normal life.

Patrick's father, after overcoming his anger at the suggestion, opts for the surgery. After the procedure, Patrick loses his ability to speak, though House says this will return. While the father is talking with House about his son's recovery, Patrick buttons his shirt, a task which he had previously been incapable of doing.

Meanwhile, Allison Cameron (Jennifer Morrison) discovers that House has been in contact with a hospital in Massachusetts and suspects that House may be looking to take a new job there. When Lisa Cuddy contacts the hospital, she learns that House has been in contact with a brain cancer specialist — not as a job applicant, but as a patient for a clinical trial. When confronted by his team, House denies the gravity of the situation and resents their interference, and they are forced to contend with the possibility his condition may be more serious than he is letting on.

Near the end of the episode, the team discovers that the medical file sent to the hospital in Massachusetts did not belong to House, and he intended to trick the doctors at the university into implanting a "cool drug" into the pleasure center of his brain, possibly in order to get over the pain in his leg.

== Awards ==
This episode was submitted for consideration in the categories of Outstanding Drama Series, Outstanding Writing in a Drama Series and Outstanding Lead Actor in a Drama Series on Hugh Laurie's behalf for the 59th Primetime Emmy Awards. This resulted in nominations in the categories of Outstanding Drama Series and Outstanding Lead Actor in a Drama Series.

== Music ==
- Patrick begins to play the Waldstein Sonata by Beethoven (1st Movement) at the piano recital, in the opening scene.
- As a test of Patrick's musical recall, House wheels a piano into his room and plays the opening bars of "I Don't Like Mondays" by the Boomtown Rats. Patrick plays them back note for note as House adds the hand-claps at the right moments.
- House also starts playing the opening bars of song we later find out is one of House's unfinished compositions. Patrick joins in and House withdraws after playing it together for a while and lets Patrick complete it. In 2010 this melody was sampled in Slacker's "I Have No Memory".
- During the fMRI, the third movement of Georges Bizet's Symphony in C major is being played.
- When Patrick was asked to pretend that his leg was a piano, he played the 3rd movement of the Waldstein Sonata.
- In the end of the episode, House walks by a restaurant with the music "See the World" by Gomez playing.
