= Battle Creek (TV series) =

American television series

- Genre: Comedy drama Police procedural Crime drama
- Created by: David Shore; Vince Gilligan
- Starring: Josh Duhamel; Dean Winters; Aubrey Dollar; Kal Penn; Janet McTeer
- Theme music composer: Brandon Calhoon
- Opening theme: "Lost to be Found"
- Composer: John Ottman
- Country of origin: United States
- Original language: English
- No. of seasons: 1
- No. of episodes: 13

Production
- Executive producers: David Shore; Vince Gilligan; Russel Friend; Garrett Lerner; Thomas L. Moran; Bryan Singer; Mark Johnson
- Camera setup: Single
- Running time: 42 minutes
- Production companies: Shore Z Productions; Gran Via Productions; CBS Television Studios; Sony Pictures Television

Original release
- Network: CBS
- Release: March 1 – May 24, 2015

Battle Creek is an American comedy-drama television series that premiered on CBS on March 1, 2015, as a weekly show broadcast on each Sunday. Starring Josh Duhamel and Dean Winters, the show followed the mismatched partnership of a police detective and FBI agent in Battle Creek, Michigan. The series received generally favorable reviews. CBS announced on May 8, 2015, after only 9 episodes had aired, that Battle Creek would end after 13 episodes.

== Cast ==
=== Main ===
- Josh Duhamel as FBI Special Agent Milton 'Milt' Chamberlain
- Dean Winters as Detective Russell 'Russ' Agnew
- Aubrey Dollar as Office Manager Holly Dale
- Edward "Grapevine" Fordham Jr. as Detective Aaron 'Funk' Funkhauser
- Kal Penn as Detective Fontanelle 'Font' White
- Janet McTeer as Commander Kim 'Guz' Guziewicz

=== Recurring ===
- Liza Lapira as Detective Erin 'E' Jacocks
- Damon Herriman as Detective Niblet
- Meredith Eaton as Meredith Oberling, BCPD's medical examiner

=== Guests ===
- Patton Oswalt as Battle Creek's unorthodox mayor, Scooter Hardy (in "Cereal Killer")
- Peter Jacobson as Darrel Hardy, the mayor's brother and chief of staff (in "Cereal Killer")
- Candice Bergen as Constance Agnew, a convicted con artist and Russ' mother (in "Mama's Boy")
- Dan Bakkedahl as Barclay Spades (in "Gingerbread Man")
- Robert Sean Leonard as Brock (in "Sympathy for the Devil")
- Joey Haro as Roger (in "Sympathy for the Devil")

== Development and production ==
In September 2013, Sony Pictures Television announced that it had struck a deal with CBS to produce a new television series created by Vince Gilligan titled Battle Creek, based on a script written by Gilligan in 2003. Despite the title of the show, establishing shots and location shots were not of Battle Creek, Michigan, though most of the scenes in the opening credits were. The main actors visited Battle Creek in the summer of 2014 to get a sense of the location, people, and especially the police department.

CBS ordered thirteen episodes, all of which it guaranteed to air. The show premiered on CBS on March 1, 2015. On May 8, 2015, the network announced that Battle Creek would not be renewed for a second season. The series ended on May 24, 2015.

== Episodes ==
=== Season 1 (2015) ===
No.	Title	Directed by	Written by	Original release date	US viewers (millions)
1	"The Battle Creek Way"	Bryan Singer	David Shore & Vince Gilligan	March 1, 2015	7.92
Detective Russ Agnew laments his police department's lack of funding and broken-down equipment, but it looks like help is on the way. FBI Special Agent Milt Chamberlain is coming to town to open a resident agency, as it appears his former field office in Detroit couldn't wait to get rid of him. Chamberlain arrives just in time for one of the biggest crimes to hit the mid-sized Michigan city: a double-homicide that might be connected to the local meth trade.
2	"Syruptitious"	Andrew Bernstein	Russel Friend & Garrett Lerner	March 8, 2015	6.93
Russ investigates the murder of a local maple syrup maker, and is surprised to learn it may have something to do with being "muscled out" by a larger syrup manufacturer. But Russ gets overzealous and interviews a suspect without the man's lawyer present, causing Commander Guziewicz to place him on suspension. Milt finds a way to keep Russ involved in the case by hiring him as an FBI consultant. While the two investigate the syrup angle, Holly sees signs that the victim's spouse was likely abused, revealing another possible motive. Elsewhere, Detective White receives phony pot from a local medical marijuana dealer. In order to charge the dealer with fraud, White has to reluctantly reveal to Guziewicz that he uses marijuana to treat migraines.
3	"Man’s Best Friend"	Oz Scott	Thomas L. Moran	March 15, 2015	6.79
After Milt, Russ and Fontanelle make a presentation at an elementary school, Fontanelle's drug-sniffing dog finds a kilo of heroin in a student's backpack. The detectives first investigate a Battle Creek police officer who is the girl's uncle, but he says he would never do that to his niece and they find no evidence of drug dealing in the officer's house. The investigation turns to a Dominican group that deals heroin, after Fontanelle notices them fleeing from cops and tossing a pack of heroin on a roof. Knowing this might put the young girl in danger, Milt and Russ try to get her to tell them how she got the heroin, but she refuses to say. Holly gets an idea that shows the heroin was stolen from an evidence room and replaced with a pack of baking soda, and Guziewicz interviews the girl's uncle again, correctly surmising he has a gambling problem. Meanwhile, Detective Jacocks helps Russ get to the root of why Milt was reassigned from Detroit to Battle Creek.
4	"Heirlooms"	Dan Sackheim	David Shore	March 22, 2015	6.05
Russ and Milt investigate the death of a local woman who had been a drug addict and prostitute, but who had apparently cleaned up recently in an attempt to reconnect with her son. The boy has been raised by the woman's half-sister, who becomes a suspect when the team learns she was trying to prevent him from seeing his blood mother. Another suspect emerges, a mysterious older "John" whom the boy recognizes from a photo on the wall of a center that holds meetings for recovering addicts. Russ and Milt visit the man's home, only to find out from his two children living there that he died a short time ago. It turns out the man wasn't a John, but instead a wealthy and successful businessman who is the real father of the deceased woman. The team revisits the man's legitimate children again, this time to arrest them as murder suspects who were trying to keep a portion of their father's fortune from going to the newly discovered third child. Meanwhile, Russ offers some personal information to Milt, namely that he's in love with Holly, in hopes of getting Milt to open up about his personal life.
5	"Old Flames"	Richard J. Lewis	Esta Spalding	March 29, 2015	6.02
During a bachelor party, the detectives get a call that Commander Guziewicz's house has gone up in flames. Russ finds glass from a window on the inside of the house, suggesting someone broke in and set the fire deliberately. As Russ, Milt and the other detectives investigate, they are surprised to find that their boss has had 17 boyfriends over the last few years, and that she has a pattern of dating a guy for a while and then ending the relationship with no explanation. This reveals several suspects, including a neighbor who made the 9-1-1 call for the fire. Fontanelle also finds that Guziewicz's last fling was with a contractor who has recently worked on at least two other burned homes. They then consider a suspect whom Guziewicz put away 12 years ago that just got out of prison. Lastly, they find that Guziewicz's estranged son, who was thought to be in a rehab facility in Florida, is actually back in town and staying in a Battle Creek halfway house. Ultimately, the cause of the Commander's house fire is found to be a romantic gesture-gone-bad, attributed to the neighbor who made the 911 call. Meanwhile, Holly receives a bouquet of flowers from an anonymous source, and Russ fears he may have called to send them while drunk at the bachelor party.
6	"Cereal Killer"	Craig Zisk	Lindsay Jewett Sturman	April 5, 2015	5.58
While making a speech to kick off the city's annual "Breakfast Day" celebration, Mayor Scooter Hardy is shot at multiple times, but the first bullet hits a young man in a cougar mascot suit who had just walked in front of the mayor. The gun is found to have been triggered remotely via cell phone. Russ says this makes the suspect list so vast, they need to use old-fashioned detective work and interview people, but Milt is able to use technology to triangulate the call to within a 2,000-square foot area that fortunately is also covered by video cameras. Hardy is kidnapped from his hospital bed after a suspect, a known drug dealer, emerges. The detectives find Hardy smoking crack in an apartment, apparently having set up the kidnapping himself. The team then thinks that the mascot was the real target, when one of the people in the video footage is revealed to be a jealous classmate who feels he had earned the mascot job. This appears to be validated when the young man in the mascot suit is shot at again while leaving the hospital. The investigation appears to be a dead end, when Russ gets an idea: the cell phone call that triggered the gun may not have gone through right away. He has Milt back up the surveillance footage of the 2,000-square foot area by 15 seconds, and they see that Mayor Hardy's brother/chief of staff Darrel (Peter Jacobson) is using a cell phone. Elsewhere, Fontanelle realizes he forgot to drop off Funkhauser's deposit check for his fiancee's preferred wedding venue months ago, and he scrambles to make things right without Funkhauser knowing.
7	"Mama's Boy"	Dan Attias	Marqui Jackson	April 12, 2015	6.48
The BCPD investigates an apparent murder when a severed foot is found washed up on Goguac Lake. Russ recognizes the shoe on the foot is a knock-off Nike, stating that those were the only shoes his con artist/counterfeiter mother gave him to wear when he was growing up. To investigate the con angle, Milt convinces a reluctant Russ that they must let his mother, Constance (Candice Bergen), out of jail. The crew follows leads that include Constance's former connection/lover Henry, as well as the manager of a cell phone store who may have been in on a con that Constance was part of. As Det. Niblet watches video footage of a months-ago break in at a storage facility and identifies a person as the deceased man, Constance recognizes him as Arnold Mathis, her accomplice in the cell phone con. Constance tells Russ and the team that the con cost the cell store one million dollars, but Mathis' father, a con artist-turned-priest, says it was two million. This leads Russ to believe his mom is lying and has hid the other million dollars somewhere, and that she may also be the killer. While the trail eventually leads to Henry being the killer, Russ sees that Constance did in fact have the million dollars hidden. Before going back to jail, Constance lets Holly in on a ruse she played with a reporter to test how far she would go to defend Russ. She says Holly passed the test, and Holly then proclaims that she and Russ are not together, to which Constance says, "you should be." Constance also tells Russ to watch out for Milt, saying, "I don't trust him."
8	"Old Wounds"	Randy Zisk	Russel Friend and Garrett Lerner	April 26, 2015	6.14
Guzewicz's adopted son asks Milt to find out if the man jailed for murdering his birth parents is actually innocent.
9	"Gingerbread Man"	Eriq LaSalle	Thomas L. Moran	May 3, 2015	6.18
Font is convinced that a fugitive wanted by the FBI is hiding in Battle Creek even though Milt is certain the criminal has been dead for months. Russ tries but cannot bring himself to tell Holly about his feelings for her.
10	"Stockholm"	Allison Liddi-Brown	David Shore	May 10, 2015	6.31
When an escaped convict takes Russ hostage, Milt and the Battle Creek P.D. race to find and rescue him. The kidnapper gives Russ some advice about his relationship with Milt.
11	"The Hand-Off"	Colin Bucksey	Esta Spalding and Lindsay Jewett Sturman	May 17, 2015	5.10
Milt puts his career at risk as he attempts to help a woman figure out who shot her husband. Holly wonders why the guy dating her won't initiate sex, and Jacocks suggests Holly is giving off a vibe that she loves someone else. Holly kisses Russ by surprise, and the two have sex in an evidence room.
12	"Homecoming"	James Roday	Danny Weiss	May 17, 2015	5.30
When a local high school coach is murdered, information about Russ' youth is revealed; his relationship with Holly comes to a junction, as Holly reveals she's leaving town soon to attend law school.
13	"Sympathy for the Devil"	Andrew Bernstein	Thomas L. Moran and David Shore	May 24, 2015	4.71
Milt's full backstory is revealed as he recounts a drug case from his days as a rookie in the FBI, in which he used a 16-year-old informant. The informant and his 16-year-old classmate were both killed, and the father of one of the boys is now likely behind a kidnapping that has Milt and Russ thrown into the trunk of a car. Fontanelle does some digging while Guziewicz visits the FBI Detroit office, both trying to get information and determine the car's location before it's too late.

== Reception ==
On the review aggregator website Rotten Tomatoes, Battle Creek has an approval rating of 96% based on 47 critics' reviews, with an average rating of 6.8/10. The website's consensus reads: "Battle Creek doesn't reinvent the wheel as a police procedural, but it distinguishes itself with biting humor and a darker tone than most network shows." Metacritic, which uses a weighted average, assigned a score of 73 out of 100, based on 29 critics, indicating "generally favorable" reviews.
