= Autopsy (House) =

- House episode
- Episode no.: Season 2 Episode 2
- Directed by: Deran Sarafian
- Written by: Lawrence Kaplow
- Original air date: September 20, 2005
- Running time: 44 minutes

Guest appearances
- Sasha Pieterse as Andie; Jewel Christian as Pam; Randall Park as Brad; Stephanie Venditto as Nurse Brenda Previn

Episode chronology
← Previous "Acceptance"	Next → "Humpty Dumpty"
- House season 2

"Autopsy" is the second episode of the second season of House, which premiered on the Fox network on September 20, 2005. Andie, a nine-year-old terminal cancer patient, experiences hallucinations, leading House and his team to conduct an autopsy on a live patient.

== Plot ==
House and his team struggle to find the cause of hallucinations that Andie (Sasha Pieterse) is seeing. She is a nine-year-old girl with terminal cancer (alveolar rhabdomyosarcoma), but tests reveal that her cancer is in remission, meaning that the hallucinations are unrelated to her cancer. Meanwhile, House questions Andie's motives for her bravery, suggesting it may itself be a symptom of a problem in her amygdala.

Meanwhile, Andie tells Chase that she has never kissed a boy in her life and doesn't know if she ever will. She asks Chase to kiss her. He is hesitant at first and says no but she persists. Finally he agrees, kissing her and later informing the team and House, who are surprised.

House discovers a tumor in her heart, which is surgically removed, but it does not account for the hallucinations due to being benign. House deduces that there must be a clot which the cancer deployed prior to removal. He suggests employing therapeutic hypothermia to discover the clot, which does not show on an angiograph: Cooling her body temperature down to 21 °C will stop her heart, making her clinically dead. The doctors remove 2-3 liters of blood and discover the clot when the blood is pumped back in. House compares this procedure to "performing an autopsy on a living person."

The blood removal and temperature can not be held for more than 60 seconds or she will suffer permanent damage. Wilson calls it a "lottery shot", but finding the clot will give her an additional year to live. In a tense moment Foreman finds the clot, which only appeared for a fraction of a second, and with his direction the surgery is successful.

Wilson confronts House about the placement of the blood clot – it was not in her amygdala. House concedes he was wrong about Andie's bravery being a symptom of her clot, but emphasizes that the girl's time is limited. As House is leaving the hospital he stands and admires some motorcycles. He asks the salesman if he can take one for a test ride. The episode ends with House riding the motorcycle down a long stretch of empty road.

=== Clinic patient ===
House sees Brad (Randall Park), a clinic patient who mutilated himself trying to circumcise himself with a box cutter knife in an attempt to please his new girlfriend. House refers him to a plastic surgeon.

== Reception ==
=== Accolades ===
Lawrence Kaplow won the 2006 Writers Guild of America award for Episodic Drama for this episode. The episode won a Golden Reel Award for Outstanding Achievement in Sound Editing for Dialogue and ADR in Episodic Short Form Broadcast Media. Danielle Berdman and Derek Hill received an Emmy nomination for Outstanding Art Direction for a Single-Camera Series.
