= Informed Consent (House) =

- House episode
- Episode no.: Season 3 Episode 3
- Directed by: Laura Innes
- Written by: David Foster
- Original air date: September 19, 2006

Guest appearances
- Joel Grey as Ezra Powell; Leighton Meester as Ali; Stephanie Venditto as Nurse Brenda Previn

Episode chronology
← Previous "Cane and Able"	Next → "Lines in the Sand"
- House season 3

"Informed Consent" is the third episode of the third season of House and the forty-ninth episode overall. The episode aired on Fox on September 19, 2006.

== Plot ==
House's ketamine treatment has worn off, which means he has to resort to the use of his cane as a walking aid. He has to diagnose Dr. Ezra Powell (played by Joel Grey), a 71-year-old renowned pioneer in the field of medical research who collapsed while studying cancer in lab rats. House puts Powell through diagnostic rigors, but the team is unable to come up with a conclusive diagnosis, and Powell's health continues to deteriorate. Becoming increasingly debilitated, Powell ultimately demands that the team stop the litany of medical tests and euthanize him. House strikes a deal with him and asks for one day to do tests on him.

When House fails to diagnose Powell in one day, he visits him in his room to give him a lethal morphine dose. Instead of killing him, House puts Powell in a coma, so that he can do his diagnosis in peace. Cameron becomes disgusted with House for acting against the wishes of the patient and for tricking him just so that House can solve his puzzle. House says to Cameron that "you can either save a patient or you can let him die, but you cannot do both". House also asks Cameron to read a particular medical journal. In said journal, she reads an article revealing that Dr. Powell had performed radiology treatment as an experiment on many babies without the consent of their parents. House notices that Powell has lost reflex capabilities in his right arm, and wakes Powell from his coma to find that Powell has also lost sensation in his abdomen and right leg. He sends Cameron to get skin for a biopsy, which she does after discussing Powell's lack of regret for what he did involving the radiation treatment.

House ends up diagnosing Powell with amyloidosis and Chase finds that it is of sub-type AA, and is therefore a terminal illness. The following morning, Cuddy informs House that Powell died at 2:30 am, although he had been declared stable at 2:00 am. House then goes to Cameron, who is crying in the hospital chapel, and tells her that he is proud of her, indicating that Cameron had overcome her fear and helped to end the life of the patient according to his wishes.

== Themes ==
The episode's title is a reference to the main issue of the episode, the concept of informed consent, a cornerstone of medical practice. Throughout the series, Dr. House plays fast and loose with patient consent, considering that he knows what is best for them and that their opinion is irrelevant.

== Awards ==
Jennifer Morrison and Joel Grey submitted this episode for consideration of their work in the categories of "Outstanding Supporting Actress in a Drama Series" and "Outstanding Guest Actor in a Drama Series" respectively for the 59th Primetime Emmy Awards.

== See also ==
- Radiology Patient Safety and Communication
