= Three Stories (House) =

- House episode
- Episode no.: Season 1 Episode 21
- Directed by: Paris Barclay
- Written by: David Shore
- Cinematography by: Roy H. Wagner
- Original air date: May 17, 2005
- Running time: 44 minutes

Guest appearances
- Sela Ward as Stacy Warner; Nicole Bilderback as the caring student; Andrew Keegan as the rebellious student; Josh Zuckerman as the keen student; Brent Briscoe as the farmer; Stephanie Venditto as Nurse Brenda Previn; James Saxenmeyer as the man in pain; Carmen Electra as herself

Episode chronology
← Previous "Love Hurts"	Next → "Honeymoon"
- House season 1

"Three Stories" is the twenty-first episode of the first season of House, which premiered on Fox on May 17, 2005. David Shore won an Emmy in 2005 for Outstanding Writing for A Drama Series for this episode. It won the Humanitas Prize in the '60 minute' category for the year 2006.

== Plot ==
House grudgingly agrees to fill in for a sick professor and give a lecture on diagnostics to a class of medical students. On his way to the lecture, he encounters his former girlfriend Stacy Warner, whom he has not seen in five years. Stacy asks him to examine her husband Mark, but he looks at his file and says Mark does not appear to be sick.

At the lecture, House presents three cases of patients with leg pain to the students. The three stories are intercut with each other; the following summary presents each case in chronological order.

The first patient was a farmer who appeared to have been bitten by a snake. Foreman and Chase visited the man's farm and found a timber rattlesnake. However, the farmer suffered an allergic reaction to the anti-venom, and a test of the snake's venom sac indicated that it did not recently bite anyone. The patient continued to decline, and when House informed him that he was dying, his primary concern was what would happen to his dog. House deduced that the farmer was actually bitten by his dog, not a snake, and bacteria from its mouth caused necrotizing fasciitis. The dog was euthanized and the farmer's leg was amputated, but he survived and got a new dog.

The second patient was a teenage girl who collapsed at volleyball practice. Cameron took an excessively detailed medical history and put her through several invasive tests, only to discover a thyroid condition causing depression and tendinitis. The patient did not improve after thyroxine treatment and suddenly developed hypersensitivity to touch. An MRI revealed a tumor in her leg, and Cameron warned the patient that an amputation might be necessary to remove the tumor. In the end, the tumor was removed without amputation and she fully recovered.

House initially presents the third case as Carmen Electra complaining of leg pain after a round of miniature golf. The patient was in reality a middle-aged man in extreme pain; the students initially write him off as a drug-seeker since he cannot meaningfully explain his circumstances. House catheterized the patient and discovered that his urine was tea-colored, indicating both blood and waste in the urine. The medical students do not know the differential diagnosis for waste in urine. House's team is by this point observing the lecture, and Cameron suggests muscle death, noting that myoglobin released by dying muscle shuts down the kidneys. House reveals that it took three days for doctors to diagnose the patient properly: he had a clotted aneurysm in his leg, leading to infarction. House's team members realize that the third patient was House himself, five years earlier.

Cuddy, the attending physician, informed House his only treatment options were to amputate his leg or perform a risky bypass surgery. To preserve his career, he opted for the bypass against the advice of both Cuddy and Stacy. After the bypass, House goes into cardiac arrest, and is clinically dead for nearly a full minute before he is revived. Stacy begged House to agree to the amputation, but again refused and asked to be put in a medically-induced coma. While he was unconscious, Stacy (as House's medical proxy) knowingly acted against his wishes and authorized a middle course of treatment: surgery to remove the dead muscle in his leg. As a result, House now has a permanent limp and chronic pain, resulting in or excusing his Vicodin addiction and leading to the end of his and Stacy's relationship.

When he has finished telling his story, Cuddy arrives and informs him that the lecture has over-run by twenty minutes. He explains that the original lecturer was sick from using a lead-painted mug from his children, presents the mug to her, and leaves. Later that night, House calls Stacy and agrees to examine her husband.

== Production ==
The episode was written by series creator David Shore and directed by Paris Barclay. As the episode differed from Shore's earlier work, Shore was unsure how the episode would be received, as he stated in an interview with Canadian Jewish News, "it was either the worst thing I had ever written or the best. Honestly I wasn't sure." Shore's narrative device of "false flashbacks" was largely influenced by the 1968 French science fiction film Je t'aime, je t'aime as well as Alfred Hitchcock's 1949 film Stage Fright. Fans have compared the episode's storytelling to the thriller The Usual Suspects (1995), which was directed by House executive producer Bryan Singer.

== Reception ==
"Three Stories" was first broadcast in the United States on Fox on May 17, 2005. The episode was watched by 17.68 million viewers, making House the 14th most-watched program of the week. Shore received a Primetime Emmy Award nomination for Outstanding Writing for a Drama Series. Shore was "shocked" when he heard he was nominated. He had been nominated for an Emmy Award twice before, as a producer on Law & Order, but felt this nomination was more personal and individual. Shore won the Emmy Award, and also received the 2006 Humanitas Prize in the 60 Minute Category. "Three Stories" is also responsible for the show's Peabody Award win in 2005. Barclay was nominated for a Directors Guild of America Award, but lost to Michael Apted, who had directed the Rome episode "The Stolen Eagle".

Critics reacted positively to the episode. Matt Zoller Seitz placed the episode second on his list of 2005's best individual television episodes, calling it a "high-point" for the show. Maureen Ryan of the Chicago Tribune praised the episode for its "twisty, smart and moving storytelling".
