= Annabelle Attanasio =

American actress and filmmaker

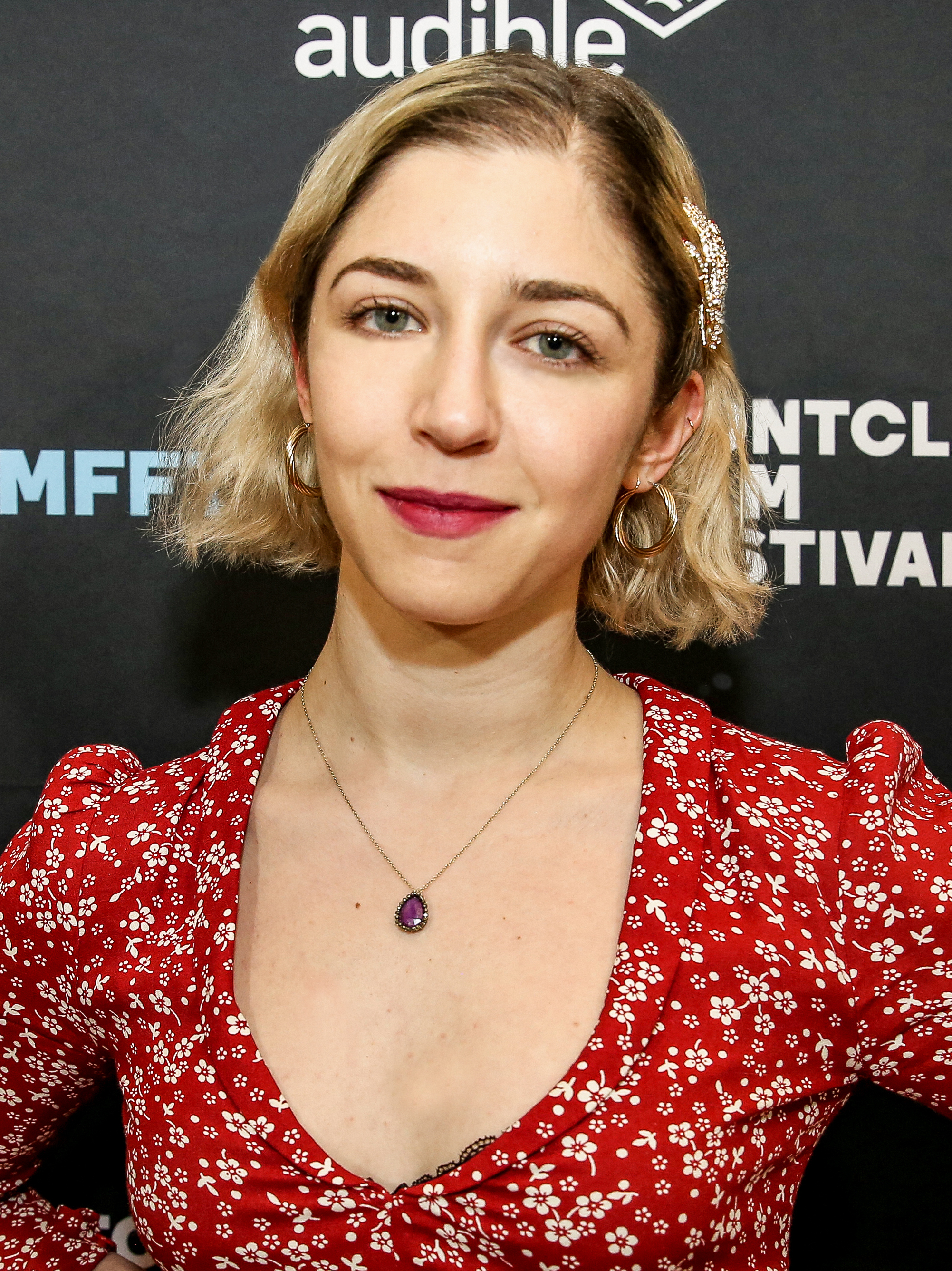
- Attanasio in 2019
- Born: 1992 or 1993 (age 32–33)
- Occupations: Actress; filmmaker
- Parents: Paul Attanasio (father); Katie Jacobs (mother)

Annabelle Attanasio (born 1992 or 1993) is an American actress and filmmaker. She is best known for her role as Cable McCory in Bull (2016–2018) and her debut feature, Mickey and the Bear (2019).

== Early life ==
Attanasio is the daughter of producers Katie Jacobs and Paul Attanasio. Her father's ancestors were Italian immigrants from Positano.

== Career ==
Attanasio played Dorothy Walcott in season 2 of the Cinemax drama The Knick. She also appeared in the Netflix original film Barry (2016).

Attanasio was main cast member of the CBS legal drama series Bull, co-created by her father, when it originally premiered in 2016 (Season 1) and through season 2 (2017–2018). She played Cable McCrory, the team's computer expert. On July 13, 2018, it was revealed that she would not be returning for season 3, leaving for the opportunity to direct a feature film.

Attanasio wrote and directed the film Mickey and the Bear, which premiered at South by Southwest 2019. It premiered to critical acclaim, described by The Hollywood Reporter as "a sharp, affecting film that's brimming with darkness and hope, every instant of it vividly alive", and named one of Variety's Best Movies of SXSW. The Washington Post called the film "one of the most exciting breakout films of the year", and RogerEbert.com called it "an almost perfectly realized drama that feels as if it was time-warped in from 40 or 50 years ago, in the tradition of great American cinema chamber pieces like The Last Picture Show, Alice Doesn't Live Here Anymore, The Great Santini, and more recently, Winter's Bone". It went on to make its international premiere at the Cannes Film Festival as a part of the Acid Official Selection and later played in competition at the Deauville American Film Festival, where it was distinguished by The New York Times as one of the standout films directed by a female filmmaker.

In 2021, Attanasio was championed by the late Jean-Marc Vallée to write, direct, and executive produce a television series entitled "The Players Table," based on the book "They Wish They Were Us," starring and executive produced by Sydney Sweeney. The series was developed at HBO Max.

Attanasio wrote, directed, and starred in the short film Frankie Keeps Talking. She also wrote, directed, and produced the short film Safe Space.

== Filmography ==
=== Film ===
Year	Title	Role	Notes
2018	Frankie Keeps Talking	Writer, director, actress	Short film
2019	Mickey and the Bear	Writer, director	Feature film directorial debut
2019	Safe Space	Writer, director, producer	Short film
2026	Lucy Schulman	TBA	Post-production

=== Television ===
Year	Title	Role	Notes
2004	Century City	Young Girl	Episode: "To Know Her"
2009	House	Jordan	Episode: "Known Unknowns"
2015	The Knick	Dorothy Walcott	6 episodes
2015	The Slap	Young Woman	Episode: "Rosie"
2016	Dr. Del	Jessie Ann	Television film
2016–2018	Bull	Cable McCrory	45 episodes
