= Century City (TV series) =

- Genre: Science fiction Legal drama Crime drama
- Created by: Ed Zuckerman
- Composer: Danny Lux
- Country of origin: United States
- Original language: English
- No. of seasons: 1
- No. of episodes: 9

Production
- Executive producers: Paul Attanasio; Katie Jacobs; Ed Zuckerman
- Running time: 60 minutes
- Production companies: Heel and Toe Films; Universal Network Television

Original release
- Network: CBS
- Release: March 16, 2004 – January 20, 2005

Century City is an American science fiction legal crime drama television series created by Ed Zuckerman, that aired on CBS from March 16, 2004, to January 20, 2005. The series is set in Los Angeles in the year 2030.

== Synopsis ==
The show follows the legal team of Crane, Constable, McNeil & Montero. At the helm are the firm's four partners, the founder and senior partner Hannah Crane; veteran attorney Marty Constable; the pleased-with-himself attorney Darwin McNeil; and the former Californian Congressman and newest partner, Tom Montero. The team is supplemented by the ambitious enthusiasm of two young associates, the self-critical and earnest Lukas Gold and the genetically enhanced first-year associate Lee May Bristol.

With the developments of cloning cells, genetic profiling, mind-altering antibiotics and even virtual rape, the attorneys of Crane, Constable, McNeil & Montero find themselves with an ongoing case-load of precedent-setting cases. In a time when lawyers can go before judges as holograms, the firm takes on such morally and ethically ambiguous cases as parents suing their doctor for withholding critical results of their unborn child's genetic mapping; defending a man accused of robbery for "stealing" back his identity from his ex-fiancée who has uploaded his presence and personality; protecting the rights of a woman who has been virtually raped through nanotechnology; and trying to enforce a contract for a rock star who refused to take a risky anti-aging treatment to help his band stay on top.

In the year 2030, the United States has 52 states and universal healthcare, Oprah Winfrey is the President of the United States (her Vice President is an openly gay, retired, one-armed, four-star U.S. armed forces general) and the moon has been colonized. Genes for homosexuality and deviant behavior have been discovered but genetic engineering allows said genes to be deactivated which as a result has impacted the artistic community greatly.

== Cast ==
=== Main ===
- Nestor Carbonell as Tom Montero
- Viola Davis as Hannah Crane
- Héctor Elizondo as Martin Constable
- Eric Schaeffer as Darwin McNeil
- Ioan Gruffudd as Lukas Gold
- Kristin Lehman as Lee May Bristol

=== Recurring ===
- Shannon Walker Williams as Voxy/model
- José Zúñiga as Attorney Randall Purgaman

== Episodes ==
No.	Title	Directed by	Written by	Original release date	Prod. code
1	"Pilot"	Michael Lehmann	Ed Zuckerman	March 16, 2004	EP015
A man wants the return of a confiscated embryo which is a clone of his son. Three members of a band sue the fourth member for not undergoing a risky anti-aging treatment to stay young-looking. Danny Aiello appears in this episode.
2	"To Know Her"	J. Miller Tobin	Roger Wolfson	March 23, 2004	E5105
A woman asks Lukas and Lee May to represent her when she claims she was raped by a man who was miles away at the time. Darwin represents a boy who wants to stop growing so he can keep his job of being a child star.
3	"Love & Games"	J. Miller Tobin	David Shore	March 27, 2004	E5102
The lawyers help a baseball player with a mechanical eye when he is given an unfair advantage. A wife claims her husband is violating their pre-nuptial agreement and is filing for divorce.
4	"A Mind is a Terrible Thing to Lose"	Ron Lagomarsino	Ellie Herman	March 30, 2004	E5107
A man has to decide whether to keep an implant that is killing him or remove it and go back to being intellectually disabled. A man sleeps with a woman who has a penis and sues her for non-disclosure.
5	"Sweet Child of Mine"	Jerry Levine	Ellie Herman	December 23, 2004	E5103
Hannah, Marty and Tom represent a fertility specialist who, with the help of science, provides couples the opportunity to choose their child's genetic make-up. The doctor is being sued for not revealing to his clients that the embryo they choose will be gay. Meanwhile, Lukas, Darwin and Lee May take on a case where an affluent man burgles his ex-girlfriend's house to steal back his likeness.
6	"Without a Tracer"	Peter Markle	Ben Queen	December 30, 2004	E5104
When a girl with a Child Safe tracer implant is abducted and the system fails, her parents seek help to sue the manufacturers. A plot twist sees the girl suing her parents for her right to privacy. A man is accused by his fiancée of violating his prenuptial agreement not to talk to other women. They are referred to him through a "mate finder" device he claims he cancelled. The man accuses his ex of hacking into his PDA and reactivating the mate finder to sabotage his marriage plans.
7	"The Face Was Familiar"	Michael Lehmann	Ed Zuckerman	January 6, 2005	E5101
Martin and Hannah fight for a father's right to give his son a mind-altering drug to rid him of nightmares about past abuses. However, the drug would remove all memory of the mother who abused him.
8	"The Haunting"	David Straiton	David Gerken	January 13, 2005	E5106
Marty takes on the case of a woman fighting for possession of her dead husband's computerized likeness. Lee May and Darwin find themselves defending a son whose mother is sabotaging his dating life in order not to lose him.
9	"Only You"	Jerry Levine	Ed Zuckerman	January 20, 2005	E5108
A husband-kills-wife murder case becomes complicated when the man proclaims his innocence and there may be a previously unknown identical twin involved.

== Broadcast and release ==
Century City aired on the American CBS television network on Tuesday evenings and premiered on March 16, 2004. CBS ordered nine episodes, but aired only four before cancelling the series due to low ratings. Universal HD began broadcasting episodes on November 29, 2004, including previously unaired episodes.

In June 2009, Hulu made all nine episodes available for online viewing; however, they are cropped from their original widescreen presentations. They also bear an NBC logo, despite being a CBS program, due to Universal Television owning the series.

=== Chronological order ===
The episodes were originally aired out of chronological order, mostly regarding the appearances of the character Voxxy and the other characters' knowledge of Lee May's genetic enhancements. The intended order is as follows, and was used by Hulu:

Intended	Aired	Title
1	1	"Pilot"
2	7	"The Face Was Familiar"
3	3	"Love and Games"
4	5	"Sweet Child of Mine"
5	2	"To Know Her"
6	6	"Without a Tracer"
7	8	"The Haunting"
8	4	"A Mind is a Terrible Thing to Lose"
9	9	"Only You"
