= Lawrence Kaplow =

American television writer and producer

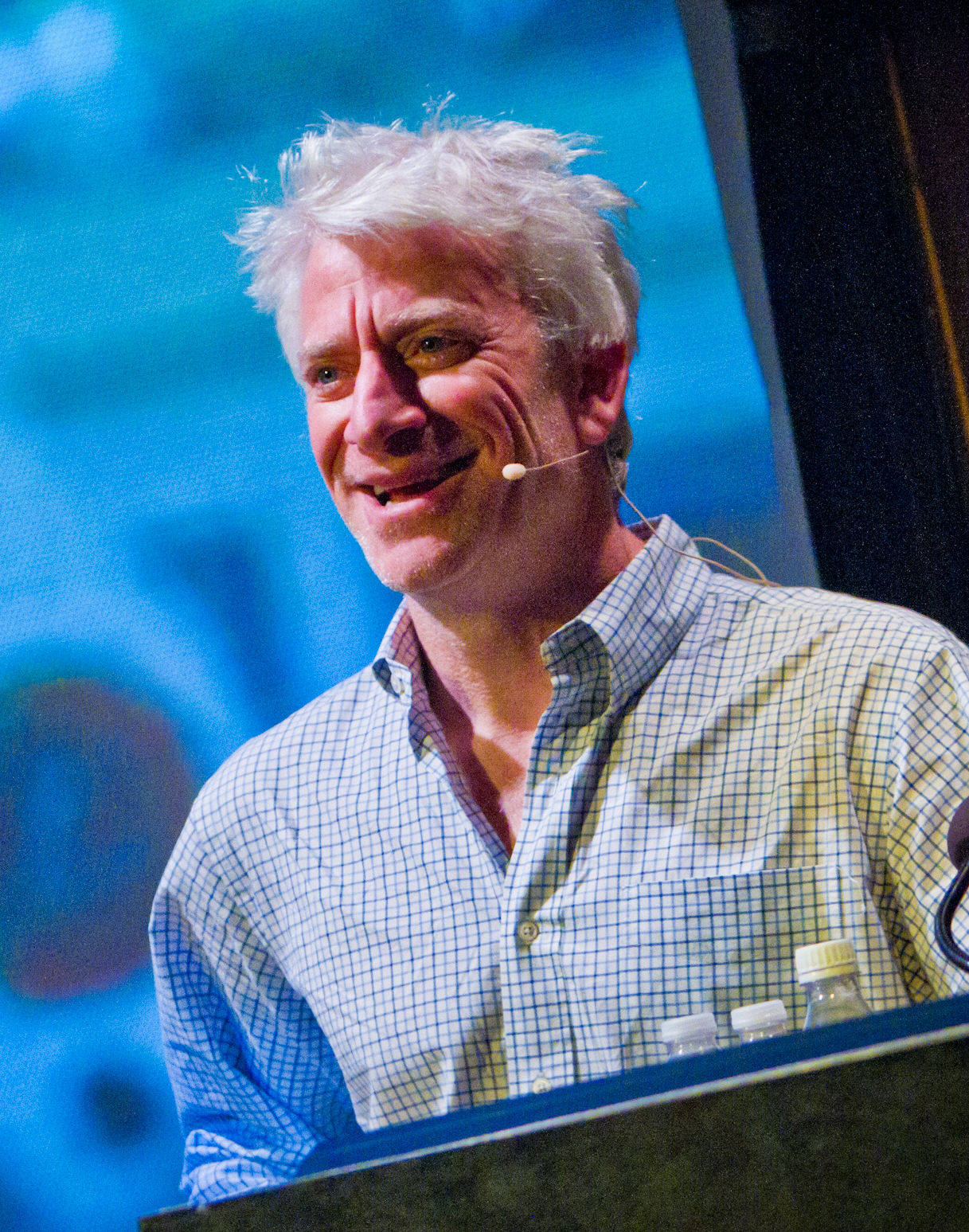
Kaplow in May 2012

Lawrence "Larry" Kaplow is an American television writer and producer most notable for his work on the FOX series House. He won the 2005 Writers Guild of America Award for "Outstanding Television Script, Episodic Drama" for the House episode "Autopsy".

In addition to House, Kaplow has written for Family Law, Hack, and K-Ville. He left House after the third season for a development deal with 20th Century Fox, but returned the following year. In 2011–2012, Kaplow was a writer/producer on the medical drama Body of Proof. He is now a co-executive producer for the television series "Law and Order: Special Victims Unit".

== House episodes as writer ==
- 1.02 - "Paternity" (2004)
- 1.11 - "Detox", with Thomas L. Moran (2005)
- 1.14 - "Control" (2005)
- 1.19 - "Kids", with Thomas L. Moran (2005)
- 1.22 - "Honeymoon", with John Mankiewicz (2005)
- 2.02 - "Autopsy" (2005)
- 2.12 - "Distractions" (2006)
- 2.23 - "Who's Your Daddy?", with John Mankiewicz (teleplay) (2006)
- 2.24 - "No Reason" (story) (2006)
- 3.01 - "Meaning", (story and teleplay) with David Shore (2006)
- 3.02 - "Cane and Able" (story) (2006)
- 3.15 - "Half-Wit" (2007)
- 3.24 - "Human Error" with Thomas L. Moran (2007)
- 5.02 - "Not Cancer" with David Shore (2008)
- 5.13 - "Big Baby" with David Foster (2009)
- 5.23 - "Under My Skin" with Pamela Davis (2009)
- 6.06 - "Brave Heart" (2009)
- 6.16 - "Black Hole" (2010)
- 7.07 - "A Pox on Our House" (2010)
- 7.16 - "Out of the Chute" with Thomas L. Moran (2011)
