= Garrett Lerner =

American television writer and producer

- Born: United States
- Occupations: Television writer, producer
- Years active: 1998–present

Garrett Lerner is an American television writer and producer who served as an executive producer on the Fox series House. He often works with his writing partner Russel Friend.

== Television career ==
Lerner's writing career began on the CBS crime series Martial Law, after which he served as a writer and producer on several series through the late 1990s until the early 2000s, including FreakyLinks, Roswell, John Doe, Boston Public, LAX and Smallville. In 2005, he and Friend joined the writing staff of the medical mystery series House. Their first episode, "Acceptance", was the premiere of the second season. At the start of the fourth season Lerner became an executive producer, a job which he currently still occupies. He and Russel Friend also co-wrote musical dramedy Glee's Season Four episode Guilty Pleasures.

=== Episodes of House ===
- "Acceptance" (2.01)
- "Skin Deep" (2.13)
- "Euphoria (Part Two) (2.21)
- "Meaning" (3.01)
- "Cane and Able" (3.02)
- "Fetal Position" (3.17)
- "97 Seconds" (4.03)
- "House's Head" (4.15)
- "Wilson's Heart" (4.16)
- "Let Them Eat Cake" (5.10)
- "Locked In" (5.19)
- "Broken" (6.01/6.02)
- "Moving the Chains" (6.13)
- "Lockdown" (6.17)
- "Help Me" (6.22)
- "After Hours" (7x22)
- "Nobody's Fault" (8x11)
- "Holding On" (8x21)

== Awards and nominations ==
In 2010, Lerner was the recipient of the Writers Guild of America award for the House season six premiere "Broken", which he shared with Russel Friend, David Foster and David Shore. Four years running he was nominated for a Primetime Emmy Award for his work on House.
