= Mickey and the Bear =

2019 American drama film by Annabelle Attanasio

- Theatrical release poster
- Directed by: Annabelle Attanasio
- Written by: Annabelle Attanasio
- Produced by: Anja Murmann; Sabine Schnek; Lizzie Shapiro; Taylor Shung
- Starring: Camila Morrone; James Badge Dale; Calvin Demba; Ben Rosenfield; Rebecca Henderson
- Cinematography: Conor Murphy
- Edited by: Henry Hayes
- Music by: Brian McOmber
- Production companies: Thick Media; Shorelight Media
- Distributed by: Utopia
- Release dates: March 9, 2019 (SXSW); November 15, 2019 (United States)
- Running time: 86 minutes
- Country: United States
- Language: English
- Box office: $57,188

Mickey and the Bear is a 2019 American drama film written and directed by Annabelle Attanasio. It stars Camila Morrone, James Badge Dale, Calvin Demba, Ben Rosenfield and Rebecca Henderson.

It had its world premiere at South by Southwest on March 9, 2019. It was released on November 15, 2019, by Utopia.

== Plot ==
Mickey Peck is navigating through both life in her hometown in Anaconda, Montana, and her loving but volatile relationship with her single, veteran father Hank, for whom she has to take responsibility. Despite searching for her own identity and independence, Mickey is determined to keep her household afloat.

== Cast ==
- Camila Morrone as Mickey Peck
- James Badge Dale as Hank Peck
- Calvin Demba as Wyatt Hughes
- Ben Rosenfield as Aron Church
- Rebecca Henderson as Leslee Watkins

== Production ==
Mickey and The Bear began principal photography on August 20, 2018. Production was filmed in and around Anaconda, Montana. Other locations including at Georgetown Lake (Montana), located 14 miles outside of Anaconda. The scene in which Wyatt and Mickey are sitting at shore near the river and where Hank jumps in the river, was filmed at the Johnsrud Park near the Blackfoot River in Missoula County. After 5 weeks, filming was completed on September 23, 2018.

== Release ==
It had its world premiere at South by Southwest on March 9, 2019. The film had its international premiere at the ACID (Association for the Distribution of Independent Cinema) programme section at Cannes, which runs parallel to the main film festival. During its festival run Mickey and the Bear picked up a series of awards, including Best Narrative Feature at the New Hampshire Film Festival, the Grand Jury Prize at the Independent Film Festival of Boston, and the Audible Storyteller Award for Attanasio at the Montclair Film Festival.

Shortly after its premiere at SXSW, Utopia acquired distribution rights to the film. It was released on November 13, 2019.

== Critical reception ==
Mickey and the Bear received positive reviews from film critics. It holds a 100% approval rating on review aggregator website Rotten Tomatoes, based on 45 reviews, with an average of 7.7/10. The website's critics consensus reads: "Brought to life by a breakout performance by Camila Morrone, Mickey and the Bear finds affecting drama at the crossroads of a young woman's coming-of-age journey." On Metacritic, the film holds a rating of 79 out of 100, based on 13 critics, indicating "generally favorable reviews".
