= John Doe (TV series) =

2002 American science fiction drama TV series

- Genre: Drama; Science fiction
- Created by: Brandon Camp; Mike Thompson
- Starring: Dominic Purcell; John Marshall Jones; Jayne Brook; Sprague Grayden; William Forsythe
- Country of origin: United States
- Original language: English
- No. of seasons: 1
- No. of episodes: 21

Production
- Executive producers: Brandon Camp; Mimi Leder; Mike Thompson
- Running time: 44 minutes
- Production companies: Camp-Thompson Productions; Regency Television; Fox Television Studios

Original release
- Network: Fox
- Release: September 20, 2002 – April 25, 2003

John Doe is an American science fiction drama television series that aired on Fox during the 2002–2003 TV season.

== Synopsis ==
I woke up in an island off the coast of Seattle. I didn't know how I got there ... or who I was. But I did seem to know everything else. There were things about me I didn't understand ... the brand, being colorblind, extreme claustrophobia. And while my gifts provided answers for others, I still search for my own. My name is John Doe.

In the opening scene of the series' pilot episode, a mysterious man awakens on an island off the coast of Seattle, Washington, naked, with absolutely no memory of who he is or how he got there. Apart from the details of his own past, "John Doe", as he comes to call himself, seems to have access to the sum total of all human knowledge: he knows how many dimples are on a golf ball, the population of Morocco, and other such obscure (and not-so-obscure) facts. He has expert knowledge on everything from the stock market to computers. John attempts to find clues about his past by using his unusual ability while also helping to solve crimes with the Seattle police department. It becomes clear that an international conspiracy known as the Phoenix Organization is watching John's every move.

== Who is John Doe? ==
Due to the series' cancellation, the final episode ended with an unresolved cliffhanger, revealing that Digger, John's close friend, was in fact the leader of the Phoenix Organization. In an interview with Entertainment Weekly, series creators Brandon Camp and Mike Thompson revealed what would have happened and John Doe's true identity.

Make that someone who looked like John's friend. The villain unmasked in the finale was actually just a Phoenix member with some fancy facial reconstruction. Turns out, the Phoenix believed Doe was the Messiah and its members were actually protecting Doe from a second group, which wanted him dead. The truth: Doe was injured in a boating accident. That mark on his chest? A scar left by a piece of shrapnel from the explosion. His Überbrain? A by-product of transcending his body during a near-death experience, traveling to a spiritual plane where all the universe's questions are answered.

== Cast ==
=== Main cast ===
- Dominic Purcell as John Doe
- John Marshall Jones as Frank Hayes
- Jayne Brook as Jamie Avery
- Sprague Grayden as Karen Kawalski
- William Forsythe as Digger

=== Recurring cast ===
- Rekha Sharma as Stella
- David Lewis as Stu
- Michelle Hart as Nance Fenton
- Grace Zabriskie as Yellow Teeth
- Gary Werntz as Trenchcoat
- David Parker as Detective Roosevelt
- Gabrielle Anwar as Rachel
- Matt Winston as Samuel Donald Clarkson

== Episodes ==
No.	Title	Directed by	Written by	Original release date	Prod. code
1	"Pilot"	Mimi Leder	Brandon Camp & Mike Thompson	September 20, 2002	10-02-179
A man with no memory of himself is found in Puget Sound. He knows everything else it is possible to know, and uses this ability to make a fortune, first gambling on horses and then the stock market. He takes the name John Doe. Later, a little girl is kidnapped, and John helps the Seattle Police find her. In the last scene of the pilot episode, a lady on a boat calls out to him, "Tommy".
2	"Blood Lines"	Mimi Leder	Brandon Camp & Mike Thompson	September 27, 2002	10-02-101
John's friend Karen Kawalski (Sprague Grayden) is fired from her job, and John takes her on as his assistant. Also, John helps the Seattle Police save a man and his family. The man has been smuggling illegal aliens, and when a group of them dies, their relative decides to exact revenge.
3	"Doe Re: Me"	Henry Bronchtein	Gardner Stern	October 4, 2002	10-02-103
John helps police officers Lt. Jamie Avery (Jayne Brook) and Frank Hayes (John Marshall Jones) solve a series of gruesome murders. A mother who put her twins up for adoption (with bad results for the twins) is exacting revenge on all the people involved in the adoption. Also, a doctor who learns something about John's past is killed by a secret organization.
4	"Past Imperfect"	Bill L. Norton	Russel Friend & Garrett Lerner	October 18, 2002	10-02-102
A woman's body is found in a 30-year-old barrel. The police look up the owner of the corresponding vineyard, who bears an uncanny resemblance to John, looking as he does now, but 30 years ago. The body may be his mother, and John helps catch the killer, who may be his father.
5	"John Deux"	Félix Enríquez Alcalá	Geoffrey Neigher	October 25, 2002	10-02-104
Another man is found in the Puget Sound. John visits him in the hospital, and the man seems to recognize him before John is thrown out. The man then disappears, and John looks for him. A rogue doctor has illegally harvested the man's organs, and Frank saves John before the same can happen to him. Also, another man who seems to know something of John's past is killed.
6	"Low Art"	Dwight H. Little	Gretchen J. Berg & Aaron Harberts	November 1, 2002	10-02-105
Doe's trust of Karen is called into question after she is suspected of stealing an art piece.
7	"Mind Games"	Frederick King Keller	Adele Lim and Russel Friend & Garrett Lerner	November 8, 2002	10-02-106
A mother and child show up on Doe's doorstep, claiming he is the father.
8	"Idaho"	Henry Bronchtein	Brandon Camp & Mike Thompson	November 15, 2002	10-02-107
A series of events lead Doe to Idaho, where he meets apparent family friends. However, all is not what it seems.
9	"Manifest Destiny"	Leslie Libman	Timothy J. Lea	December 6, 2002	10-02-108
After John decides to take a holiday, a vicar on his flight is poisoned. John must discover the murderer's identity before more people are killed.
10	"The Mourner"	Mimi Leder	Matt Pyken & Michael Berns	December 13, 2002	10-02-109
John is trapped in a battle of wits with "The Mourner," a serial killer who leaves a sympathy card with the bodies of his victims.
11	"John D.O.A."	Michelle MacLaren	Matt Pyken & Michael Berns	January 10, 2003	10-02-110
The concluding episode to The Mourner.
12	"Tone Dead"	Randall Zisk	Brandon Camp & Mike Thompson and Gretchen J. Berg & Aaron Harberts	January 17, 2003	10-02-111
John investigates the murder of a DJ.
13	"Family Man"	Bryan Spicer	Geoffrey Neigher	January 31, 2003	10-02-112
After a string of kidnappings, Doe's unique talents are needed to track down the culprit.
14	"Ashes to Ashes"	Mimi Leder	Brandon Camp & Mike Thompson	February 14, 2003	10-02-114
When Karen is kidnapped, John finds himself brought back to Horseshoe Island.
15	"Psychic Connection"	Ian Sander	Gretchen J. Berg & Aaron Harberts	March 7, 2003	10-02-115
Skeptical Doe teams up with a psychic to solve a case.
16	"Illegal Alien"	Henry Bronchtein	Russel Friend & Garrett Lerner	March 14, 2003	10-02-113
After a US astronaut is shot dead in the woods outside Seattle, John investigates the theory that he may have been abducted by aliens.
17	"Doe or Die"	David Straiton	Russel Friend & Garrett Lerner and Brandon Camp & Mike Thompson	March 21, 2003	10-02-117
A rogue agent threatens to unleash Smallpox upon the country.
18	"Save As... John Doe"	Keith Samples	Gretchen J. Berg & Aaron Harberts and Brandon Camp & Mike Thompson	March 28, 2003	10-02-116
Missing artificial intelligence research may have a direct connection to Doe's past.
19	"Shock to the System"	Bobby Roth	David Manson and Gretchen J. Berg & Aaron Harberts and Brandon Camp & Mike Thompson	April 4, 2003	10-02-118
Doe loses his encyclopedic mind after he is struck by lightning. He is also challenged by a serial killer at this time.
20	"Remote Control"	Paul Shapiro	Gretchen J. Berg & Aaron Harberts	April 18, 2003	10-02-119
Doe discovers the Seneca Institute, where "fallen geniuses" are being conditioned with psychic abilities.
21	"The Rising"	Mimi Leder	Brandon Camp & Mike Thompson	April 25, 2003	10-02-120
The series reaches a shocking finale as John uses his analytic abilities to find the Phoenix organization.

== Syndication ==
On January 20, 2006, the series was syndicated to the Sci-Fi channel.

== Reception ==
On Metacritic, the series has a score of 65 out of 100 based on 22 reviews, indicating "generally favorable reviews". On Rotten Tomatoes, the series has an approval rating of 73% with an average rating of 7/10 based on 26 reviews, with a critical consensus stating: "John Doe overcomes its somewhat dubious premise with an alluring sense of mystery and a nuanced performance from Dominic Purcell." Phil Gallo of Variety wrote, "It's so stylishly executed, with Mimi Leder's direction, a crisp script and magnetic lead by Dominic Purcell, that the John Doe indeed has a solid identity."

== See also ==
- Akashic records
- Blindspot (TV series)
- Coronet Blue
- Kyle XY
