= Russel Friend =

American television writer and producer

- Born: United States
- Occupations: Television writer, producer
- Years active: 1998–present

Russel Friend is an American television writer and producer who served as an executive producer on the Fox series House, for which he won a Writers Guild of America Award in 2010 for co-writing the episode "Broken". He often works with his writing partner Garrett Lerner.

== Television career ==
Friend's writing career began on the CBS crime series Martial Law, after which he served as a writer and producer on several series through the late 1990s until the early 2000s, including FreakyLinks, Roswell, John Doe, Boston Public, LAX and Smallville. In 2005, he and Lerner joined the writing staff of the medical mystery series House. Their first episode, "Acceptance", was the premiere of the second season. At the start of the fourth season, Friend became an executive producer. He was also a Consulting Producer and writer on Glee.

== Filmography ==
| Year | Title | Credited as | | | | Network | Notes |
| Year | Title | Creator | Writer | Executive Producer | Producer | Network | Notes |
|---|---|---|---|---|---|---|---|
| 1998–1999 | Martial Law | No | Yes (3) | No | No | CBS | |
| 1999 | The Strip | No | Yes (2) | No | Yes | UPN | Story Editor (3 episodes) |
| 2000–2001 | FreakyLinks | No | Yes (3) | No | No | Fox | |
| 2001–2002 | Roswell | No | Yes (2) | No | Yes | The WB, UPN | Executive Story Editor (2 episodes) |
| 2002–2003 | John Doe | No | Yes (5) | No | Yes | Fox | Supervising Producer (10 episodes) |
| 2002 | Smallville | No | Yes (1) | No | No | The WB | Episode: "Redux" |
| 2003–2004 | Boston Public | No | Yes (3) | No | Yes | Fox | Supervising Producer (Season 4) |
| 2004–2005 | LAX | No | Yes (4) | Yes | No | NBC | Co-executive Producer (10 episodes) |
| 2005–2012 | House | No | Yes (18) | Yes | No | Fox | Co-executive Producer (seasons 2–3); Executive Producer (seasons 4-8) |
| 2012–2014 | Glee | No | Yes (4) | Yes | Yes | Fox | Consulting producer (season 4); Executive Producer (season 5) |
| 2015 | Battle Creek | No | Yes (2) | Yes | No | CBS | |
| 2017 | Dirk Gently's Holistic Detective Agency | No | Yes (2) | No | Yes | BBC America (United States); Netflix (International) | Consulting producer (season 2) |
| 2018 | Altered Carbon | No | Yes (2) | Yes | No | Netflix | Executive Producer (season 1) |
| 2018 | Rise | No | Yes (1) | Yes | No | NBC | Co-executive Producer |
| 2020–2021 | Home Before Dark | No | Yes (4) | Yes | No | Apple TV+ | |
| 2021–2022 | Ordinary Joe | Yes | Yes (13) | Yes | No | NBC | Co-created with Garrett Lerner |
| 2023 | La Brea | No | Yes (1) | No | Yes | NBC | Consulting producer (season 2) |
| 2022–2024 | Walker | No | Yes (5) | Yes | No | The CW | |
| 2025–present | Doctor Odyssey | No | Yes (2) | Yes | No | ABC | Co-executive Producer (season 1) |

== Awards and nominations ==
In 2010, Friend was the recipient of the Writers Guild of America award for the House season six premiere "Broken", which he shared with Garrett Lerner, David Foster and David Shore. Four years running he was nominated for a Primetime Emmy Award for his work on House.
