= Finding Judas =

- House episode
- Episode no.: Season 3 Episode 9
- Directed by: Deran Sarafian
- Written by: Sara Hess
- Original air date: November 28, 2006

Guest appearances
- David Morse as Detective Michael Tritter; Paula Cale as Edie Hartman; Christopher Gartin as Rob Hartman; Alyssa Shafer as Alice Hartman; Jodi Long as the judge

Episode chronology
← Previous "Whac-A-Mole"	Next → "Merry Little Christmas"
- House season 3

"Finding Judas" is the ninth episode of the third season of House and the fifty-fifth episode overall. The episode aired on Fox on November 28, 2006.

== Plot ==
While at a carnival with her father, six-year-old Alice starts screaming hysterically. Each time the doctors perform a test on Alice, her skin reacts as if she has allergies to everything, even after they do surgery for gallstones. House suspects an infection and recommends broad-spectrum antibiotics, but Cuddy (elected guardian of the kid to decide best treatment when the divorced parents can't decide on anything) decides on Metronidazole. Alice keeps getting worse and Cuddy runs a charcoal hemoperfusion, during which Alice develops a clot in her arm. Foreman and Cuddy operate on her and remove the clot, during which time her temperature rises dangerously. With no ice packs in the room, Cuddy decides to take her into the shower, whereupon House berates her and says that it was good that she failed to be a mom, "because you suck at it."

House, on a controlled amount of pills rather than a free prescription due to Cuddy, concludes the kid has necrotizing fasciitis, and decides her only chance for survival is amputation of the infected limbs. Chase, playing with a laser pointer, realizes that Alice has erythropoietic protoporphyria (an allergy to lights that made her get worse every time she was put under surgery), but House ignores the diagnosis and punches him in the face. House, embarrassed by his tantrum and lack of understanding, realizes that Chase is right.

After the surgery is stopped, Chase enters the doctors lounge, visibly stressed. Chase tells Wilson that he cannot stand the situation anymore, and that he's become impatient with waiting for House's approval and abruptly leaves the room. In the final scene, Wilson is shown visiting Tritter, who earlier had the accounts of Cameron and Foreman frozen temporarily in an attempt to try to get one of them to rat on him (Chase, however, had lied about having his accounts frozen). Wilson asks for his "thirty pieces of silver", a reference to the price for which Judas betrayed Jesus.

== Awards ==
Lisa Edelstein and David Morse submitted this episode for consideration in their behalf in the categories of "Outstanding Supporting Actress in a Drama Series" and "Outstanding Guest Actor in a Drama Series" for the 2007 Emmy Awards.
