= Paul Attanasio =

American screenwriter and producer (born 1959)

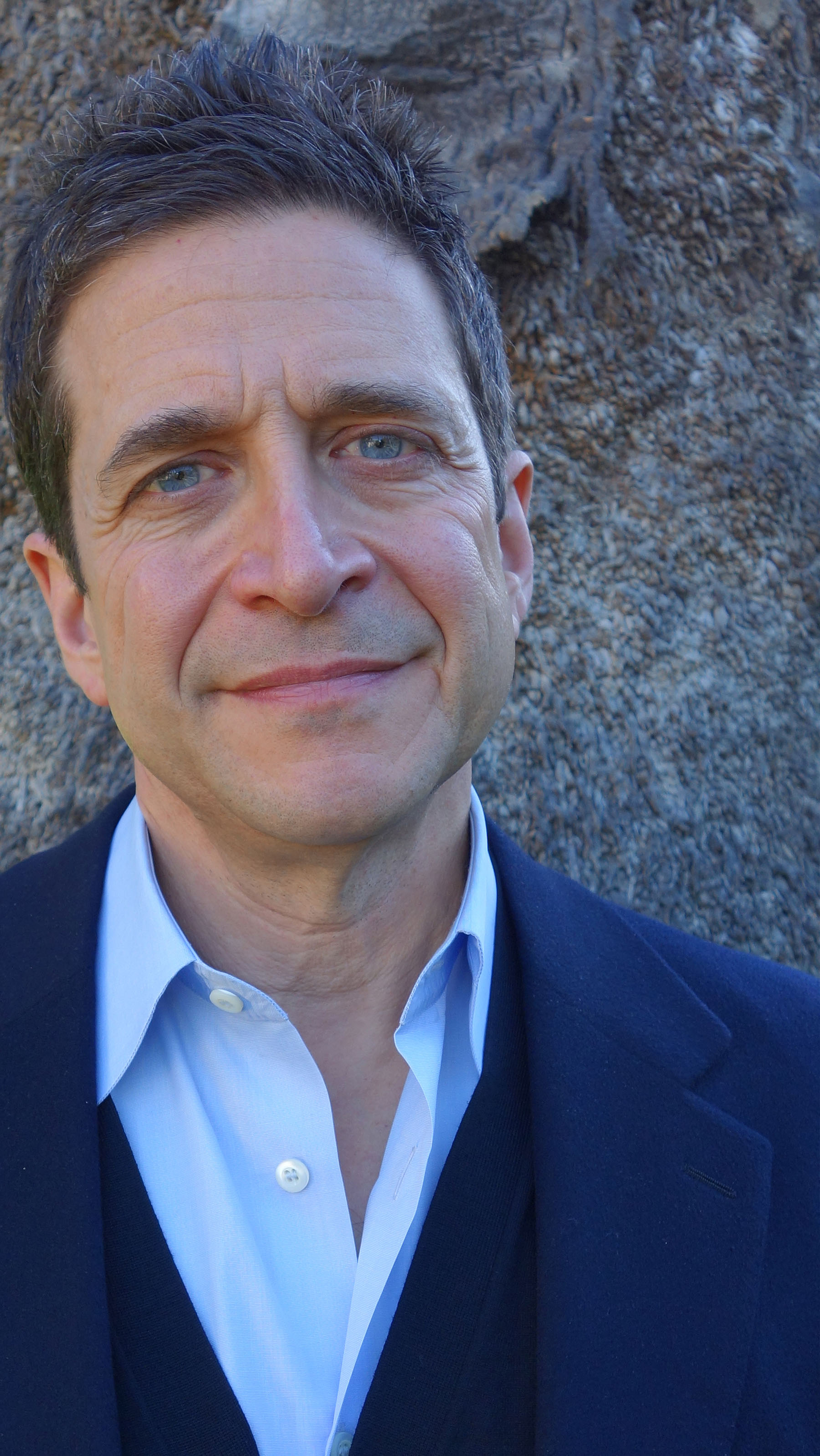
- Attanasio in 2015
- Born: Paul Albert Attanasio; November 14, 1959 (age 66); New York City, U.S.
- Occupations: Screenwriter; producer
- Spouse(s): Katie Jacobs (divorced); Amanda Benefiel
- Children: 3, including Annabelle
- Relatives: Mark Attanasio (brother)

Paul Albert Attanasio (born November 14, 1959) is an American screenwriter and producer. He has twice been nominated for the Academy Award for Best Adapted Screenplay, for Quiz Show (1994) and Donnie Brasco (1997).

== Early life ==
Paul Albert Attanasio was born in the New York City borough of the Bronx on November 14, 1959, the son of real estate broker Connie and commercial consultant Joseph Attanasio. His great-grandparents were Italian immigrants from Positano in Campania. His older brother, Mark Attanasio, became a businessman and principal owner of the Milwaukee Brewers. Attanasio grew up in the Pelham Bay section of the Bronx, and later in Tenafly, New Jersey, where he graduated from Tenafly High School in 1977, where he played tennis and participated in several school programs. He is a 1981 graduate of Harvard College, where he lived in Currier House, and earned his Juris Doctor degree at Harvard Law School in 1984.

== Career ==
Attanasio was a film critic for The Washington Post from 1984 to 1987. He started writing for television with the CBS sitcom Doctor Doctor and the NBC crime drama series Homicide: Life on the Street, for which he holds a "created by" credit.

In 1995, Attanasio won a BAFTA Award for Best Adapted Screenplay for his work on Quiz Show. He later wrote the screenplays for the thriller Disclosure, the gangster thriller Donnie Brasco, the science fiction thriller Sphere, and the political thrillers The Sum of All Fears and The Good German. While he was making films, he started Heel & Toe Films, with a first-look production pact at Paramount Pictures on July 17, 1998.

In 2000, Attanasio returned to television as an executive producer of and writer for the medical drama Gideon's Crossing, as well as the pilot for R.U.S.H. On September 10, 2001, the Heel & Toe Films production company had signed a deal with Studios USA. In 2004, Attanasio, alongside his then-wife and business partner Katie Jacobs and David Shore, pitched what would become House, of which he was credited as an executive producer. He also co-created Bull and created Tommy, which premiered in 2016 and 2020, respectively.

In 2017, it was confirmed that Attanasio would be writing and executive producing a new Amazon Video series titled Tong Wars.

== Personal life ==
Attanasio and his ex-wife, producer and director Katie Jacobs, have a son named John and two daughters named Annabelle (who became an actress) and Grace. They continue to run their production company Heel & Toe Films together. Attanasio is now married to artist Amanda Benefiel.

In 2013 John, then aged 16, was filmed driving a Chevrolet Camaro his father bought for him as a birthday gift. John is seen shouting homophobic slurs at another driver in the video, and claiming his own vehicle is "a million dollar car" – in reality it was worth under $60,000.

== TV appearances ==
Attanasio was featured in The Dialogue interview series. In an interview with producer Mike DeLuca, he describes how he went from lambasting movies as a "snotty" Washington Post film critic to developing rewarding creative partnerships with Oscar-winning directors Robert Redford, Barry Levinson, and Steven Soderbergh.

== Filmography ==
=== Writer ===
- Quiz Show (1994)
- Disclosure (1994)
- Donnie Brasco (1997)
- Sphere (1998)
- The Sum of All Fears (2002)
- The Good German (2006)

=== Uncredited rewrites ===
- Speed (1994)
- Air Force One (1997)
- Armageddon (1998)
- Patch Adams (1998)
- Town & Country (2001)
- The Bourne Ultimatum (2007)
- The Fighter (2010)

=== Creator ===
- Homicide: Life on the Street (1993–1999)
- Gideon's Crossing (2000–2001)
- House (2004–2012, uncredited)
- Bull (2016–2022)
- Tommy (2020)
