= Katie Jacobs =

American producer

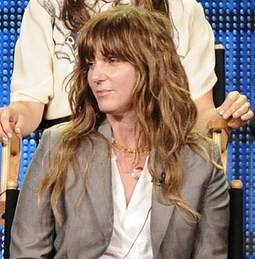
- Jacobs in August 2009
- Born: October 17, 1970 (age 55)
- Occupations: Producer; director
- Years active: 1991–present
- Spouse: Paul Attanasio (divorced)
- Children: Annabelle Attanasio

Katie Jacobs (born October 17, 1970) is an American television producer and director.

== Career ==
Jacobs produced the Fox series House and Century City. She made her directorial debut on House, directing two episodes of the third season.

== Personal life ==
Jacobs and her ex-husband, screenwriter and producer Paul Attanasio, have a son named John and two daughters named Annabelle (who became an actress) and Grace. They continue to run their production company Heel & Toe Films together.

== Selected filmography as producer ==
=== Film ===
Year	Title	Role
1991	29th Street	Associate producer
1992	Consenting Adults	Co-producer
1993	Fatal Instinct	
1994	Getting Even with Dad	
1998	A Cool, Dry Place	
TBA	Girls Like Us	

=== Television ===
Year	Title	Role	Notes
1995	A Father for Charlie	Executive producer	Television film
2000−2001	Gideon's Crossing	Executive producer	
2002	R.U.S./H.	Executive producer	Television film
2004	Century City	Executive producer	
2010	Nurse Jeffrey	Executive producer	
2004−2012	House	Executive producer	
2013	I Am Victor	Executive producer	Television film
2016	Dr. Del	Executive producer	Television film

=== Director ===
Year	Title	Notes
2007−09	House	
2010	Nurse Jeffrey	
2016	Dr. Del	Television film
2018	Damnation	
