= List of House cast members =

For more detailed character information, see List of House characters.

Below is a list of actors and actresses that are or were part of the cast of the American drama television series House.

The show's main stars have included, at some point, Hugh Laurie, Lisa Edelstein, Robert Sean Leonard, Omar Epps, Jesse Spencer, Jennifer Morrison, Peter Jacobson, Olivia Wilde, Kal Penn, Amber Tamblyn, Odette Annable, and Lo Mutac (Note: Credited as Charlyne Yi).

== Cast ==
| Starring |

| Recurring/Guest |

| No appearances |

| Character | Season | | | | | | | |
| Character | Season One (2004–2005) | Season Two (2005–2006) | Season Three (2006–2007) | Season Four (2007–2008) | Season Five (2008–2009) | Season Six (2009–2010) | Season Seven (2010–2011) | Season Eight (2011–2012) |
=== Main cast ===
| Dr. Gregory House | Hugh Laurie | Hugh Laurie | Hugh Laurie | Hugh Laurie | Hugh Laurie | Hugh Laurie | Hugh Laurie | Hugh Laurie |
| Dr. Lisa Cuddy | Lisa Edelstein | Lisa Edelstein | Lisa Edelstein | Lisa Edelstein | Lisa Edelstein | Lisa Edelstein | Lisa Edelstein | |
| Dr. James Wilson | Robert Sean Leonard | Robert Sean Leonard | Robert Sean Leonard | Robert Sean Leonard | Robert Sean Leonard | Robert Sean Leonard | Robert Sean Leonard | Robert Sean Leonard |
| Dr. Eric Foreman | Omar Epps | Omar Epps | Omar Epps | Omar Epps | Omar Epps | Omar Epps | Omar Epps | Omar Epps |
| Dr. Robert Chase | Jesse Spencer | Jesse Spencer | Jesse Spencer | Jesse Spencer | Jesse Spencer | Jesse Spencer | Jesse Spencer | Jesse Spencer |
| Dr. Allison Cameron | Jennifer Morrison | Jennifer Morrison | Jennifer Morrison | Jennifer Morrison | Jennifer Morrison | Jennifer Morrison | | Jennifer Morrison |
| Dr. Lawrence Kutner | | | | Kal Penn | Kal Penn | | | Kal Penn |
| Dr. Chris Taub | | | | Peter Jacobson | Peter Jacobson | Peter Jacobson | Peter Jacobson | Peter Jacobson |
| Dr. Remy "Thirteen" Hadley | | | | Olivia Wilde | Olivia Wilde | Olivia Wilde | Olivia Wilde | Olivia Wilde |
| Martha M. Masters | | | | | | | Amber Tamblyn | Amber Tamblyn |
| Dr. Jessica Adams | | | | | | | | Odette Annable |
| Dr. Chi Park | | | | | | | | Lo Mutuc |
=== Recurring characters ===
| Edward Vogler | Chi McBride | | | | | | | |
| Stacy Warner | Sela Ward | Sela Ward | | | | | | Sela Ward |
| Det. Michael Tritter | | | David Morse | | | | | |
| Dr. Amber Volakis | | | | Anne Dudek | Anne Dudek | | | Anne Dudek |
| Rachael Taub | | | | Jennifer Crystal Foley | Jennifer Crystal Foley | Jennifer Crystal Foley | Jennifer Crystal Foley | Jennifer Crystal Foley |
| Lucas Douglas | | | | | Michael Weston | Michael Weston | | |
| Dr. Darryl Nolan | | | | | | Andre Braugher | | Andre Braugher |
| Sam Carr | | | | | | Cynthia Watros | Cynthia Watros | |
| Dominika Petrova | | | | | | | Karolina Wydra | Karolina Wydra |
=== Unsuccessful applicants for fellowship ===
| Dr. Jeffrey "Big Love" Cole | | | | Edi Gathegi | | | | |
| Henry "Scooter" Dobson | | | | Carmen Argenziano | | | | |
| Dr. Travis "Grumpy" Brennan | | | | Andy Comeau | | | | |
| Dr. Jody Desai | | | | Meera Simhan | | | | |
| Doctor #15A | | | | Melinda Dahl | | | | |
| Doctor #15B | | | | Caitlin Dahl | | | | |
| Dr. Samira Terzi | | | | Michael Michele | | | | |
=== Family and friends ===
| Mark Warner | Currie Graham | Currie Graham | | | | | | |
| Col. John House | | R. Lee Ermey | | | R. Lee Ermey | | | |
| Blythe House | | Diane Baker | | | Diane Baker | | | Diane Baker |
| Rodney Foreman | | Charles S. Dutton | Charles S. Dutton | | | | | |
| Rachel Cuddy | | | | | Unknown | Unknown | Kayla Colbert | |
| Rachel Cuddy | | | | | Unknown | Unknown | Rylie Colbert | |
| Rachel Cuddy | | | | | Unknown | Unknown | Emily Hahn | |
| Juan "Alvie" Alvarez | | | | | | Lin-Manuel Miranda | | |
| Arlene Cuddy | | | | | | | Candice Bergen | |
| Julia Cuddy | | | | | | | Paula Marshall | |
| Ruby | | | | | | | Zena Grey | Zena Grey |
=== Other hospital personnel ===
| Dr. Lim | Kenneth Choi | | | | | | | |
| Dr. Wells | Al Espinosa | Al Espinosa | | | | | | |
| Dr. Lawrence Hourani | Maurice Godin | | | Maurice Godin | | Maurice Godin | Maurice Godin | |
| Dr. Ron Simpson | Ron Perkins | Ron Perkins | Ron Perkins | | | Ron Perkins | Ron Perkins | Ron Perkins |
| Nurse Brenda Previn | Stephanie Venditto | Stephanie Venditto | Stephanie Venditto | | | | | |
| Nurse Regina | | | | | Tracy Vilar | Tracy Vilar | Tracy Vilar | Tracy Vilar |
| Nurse Sandy | | | | | | Christina Vidal | | |
| Sanford Wells | | | | | | Nigel Gibbs | Nigel Gibbs | |
| Dr. Riggin | | | | | | | Brian Huskey | |
=== Minor characters ===
| Ali | | | Leighton Meester | | | | | |
| Lawyer Howard Gemeiner | | | Kadeem Hardison | | | | | |
| Janice Burke | | | | | Lori Petty | | | |
| Emily | | | | | | | Noelle Bellinghausen | Noelle Bellinghausen |
| Anita | | | | | | | | Yaya DaCosta |
