= Ron Perkins =

American actor

- Born: March 29, 1961 (age 64); St. Louis, Missouri, United States
- Occupation: Actor
- Years active: 1963–present

Ron Perkins (born March 29, 1961) is an American actor. He is known for his role as Mendel Stromm in Spider-Man (2002). He also appeared in The Prestige (2006) as the manager of a hotel visited by Hugh Jackman's character in Colorado Springs, as well as nine episodes of Fox TV series House and four episodes of Heroes in 2008.

Perkins also played the role of Fred Nicholson in the 2011 police action-adventure game, L.A. Noire.

== Filmography ==
=== Film ===
Year	Title	Role	Notes
1981	Endless Love	Patient	
1981	Prince of the City	Virginia Trooper	
1989	Troop Beverly Hills	Salesman	
1989	Wired	Record Producer	
1990	Welcome Home, Roxy Carmichael	Will Groom	
1994	I'll Do Anything	Victor	
1997	Volcano	Fire Chief	
1998	Ronin	Man with the Newspaper	
2000	Reindeer Games	Ice Fisherman	
2002	Spider-Man	Mendel Stromm	
2002	Simone	Studio Executive #3	
2006	The Prestige	Hotel Manager	
2009	The Perfect Game	Little League Official	
2014	Cesar Chavez	Grower Jack	
2016	Rules Don't Apply	Senator Ferguson	
2018	Don't Worry, He Won't Get Far on Foot	Dr. Katz	
2021	Moxie	U-Copy Clerk	
2021	Being the Ricardos	Macy	

=== Television ===
Year	Title	Role	Notes
1988	Dance 'til Dawn	Photographer	Television film
1988	L.A. Law	Randall Lemoyne	Episode: "Dummy Dearest"
1988–1989	Roseanne	Pete Wilkins	7 episodes
1989	Murphy Brown	Man In Crowd	Episode: "And So He Goes"
1989	Perfect Strangers	Mr. Yates	Episode: "The 'King' and I"
1989	Dynasty	Middle Aged Man	Episode: "Here Comes the Son"
1989	CBS Schoolbreak Special	2nd Testifier	Episode: "Frog Girl: The Jenifer Graham Story"
1989	My Two Dads	Frank	Episode: "Story in Development"
1989	The Neon Empire	Real Estate Man	Television film
1990	The Operation	Harold Block	Television film
1990	Family of Spies	Arnie Davis	2 episodes
1990	Jake and the Fatman	Maitre d'	Episode: "By Myself"
1990	The Fresh Prince of Bel-Air	O'Donnell	Episode: "Courting Disaster"
1990	Doogie Howser, M.D.	Al	Episode: "TV or Not TV"
1991	Dead on the Money	Bland	Television film
1991, 1992	Baby Talk	Mr. Coleman	2 episodes
1992	The New WKRP in Cincinnati	Maury Bass	Episode: "Number One Fan"
1992	Secrets	Phil Gallagher	Television film
1992	A Child Lost Forever: The Jerry Sherwood Story	James Essling	Television film
1993	Married... with Children	Doctor	Episode: "A Little Off the Top"
1994	Northern Exposure	Trooper	Episode: "A Bolt from the Blue"
1995	Ed McBain's 87th Precinct: Lightning	Meyer Meyer	Television film
1995	American Gothic	Harlan Jeeters	Episode: "A Tree Grows in Trinity"
1995	The Price of Love	Ken	Television film
1996	The Siege at Ruby Ridge	Dwight Stanfield	Television film
1996	The Secret She Carried	Roy Cicero	Television film
1997	Diagnosis: Murder	Russ Anderson	Episode: "Murder in the Air"
1997	George Wallace	Nicholas Katzenbach	Miniseries
1998	Spy Game	Dr. John Russell	Episode: "Necessity Is the Mother of Infection"
1999	Storm of the Century	Peter Godsoe	2 episodes
1999	Lansky	Moses Polakoff	Television film
2000	Felicity	Dr. Martin	Episode: "True Colors"
2001	The Huntress	Ben Ainsley	Episode: "With Great Powers"
2002	Firestarter: Rekindled	Special Agent Pruitt	2 episodes
2002	Path to War	Air Force Colonel	Television film
2002	NYPD Blue	David Bender	Episode: "Death by Cycle"
2003	Carnivàle	Carroll Templeton	Episode: "After the Ball Is Over"
2003	Rent Control	Gene	Television film
2004	Plainsong	Lloyd Crowder	Television film
2004	CSI: Crime Scene Investigation	Dean	Episode: "What's Eating Gilbert Grissom?"
2004	ER	Mr. Elmore	Episode: "Shot in the Dark"
2005	American Dreams	Frank Powers	3 episodes
2005	Medium	Bank Manager	Episode: "Light Sleeper"
2005–2011	House	Dr. Ron Simpson	9 episodes
2006	In Justice	Craig Zagala	Episode: "Pilot"
2006	Invasion	Man	Episode: "The Key"
2006	Without a Trace	Dr. Levine	Episode: "Requiem"
2007	Pandemic	Dr. Chuck Westley	Miniseries
2007	Las Vegas	Calvin Doyle	Episode: "The Glass Is Always Cleaner"
2008	Heroes	Doctor	4 episodes
2009	Parks and Recreation	George	Episode: "Rock Show"
2010	Mad Men	Jim Hartsdale	Episode: "Public Relations"
2010	Grey's Anatomy	Roy Henley	2 episodes
2011	Criminal Minds: Suspect Behavior	Reverend Sands	Episode: "Here Is the Fire"
2012	Game Change	Bill McInturff	Television film
2012	Veep	Sam Finnigan	Episode: "Chung"
2012	Longmire	Insurance Agent	Episode: "A Damn Shame"
2012	The Mentalist	Park Ranger	Episode: "Red Sails in the Sunset"
2013	Private Practice	Tom Peterson	Episode: "Good Fries Are Hard to Come By"
2014	Scandal	Judge Henry Sparks	Episode: "Inside the Bubble"
2015–2018	Modern Family	Judge Katz	3 episodes
2017	Code Black	Bill Chislett	2 episodes
2017	Brockmire	Abortion Doctor	Episode: "Road Trip"
2019	The High Life	Levis Gold	Episode: "Pilot"
2020	Dirty John	Judge Edgar Russell	3 episodes
