= Hack (TV series) =

American crime drama television series

- Genre: Crime drama
- Created by: David Koepp
- Starring: David Morse; Andre Braugher; Matthew Borish; George Dzundza; Donna Murphy; Matt Czuchry; Jacqueline Torres; JoAnna Rhinehart; Paul Adelstein; Bebe Neuwirth
- Theme music composer: Stephen Phillips; Tim Paruszkiewicz
- Composer: Jay Gruska
- Country of origin: United States
- Original language: English
- No. of seasons: 2
- No. of episodes: 40

Production
- Executive producers: Thomas Carter; Gavin Polone; David Shore; Robert Singer
- Producers: Nan Bernstein Freed; Mark A. Baker
- Cinematography: Craig DiBona; Sharone Meir
- Editors: John Axelrad; Erik Whitmyre
- Running time: 60 minutes
- Production companies: Pariah Television; CBS Productions; Big Ticket Television

Original release
- Network: CBS
- Release: September 27, 2002 – March 13, 2004

Hack is an American crime drama television series created by David Koepp that aired on CBS in the United States from September 27, 2002, to March 13, 2004, having 40 episodes broadcast over two seasons. The series centers on former Philadelphia police officer Mike Olshansky (David Morse), who leaves the force after being accused of corruption and works as a taxi driver.

== Premise ==
Mike Olshansky, a Philadelphia police officer, leaves the force after being accused of corruption. Although the charges were never clearly proven, Olshansky, riddled with guilt, considers it his duty to make up for his past wrongs by helping those the police will not help. While working as a taxi driver, Olshansky saves many lives and people by going above and beyond the call of duty, becoming a kind of heroic vigilante.

He receives "inside" help from within the police force from his ex-partner Marcellus Washington, who often comes close to risking his own career. Meanwhile, he tries to repair his relationships and rebuild his life after losing his marriage, his son's admiration, his professional identity and his reputation.

== Cast ==
Cast listed by number of episodes in which they appeared

- David Morse as Mike Olshansky
- Andre Braugher as Marcellus Washington
- Matthew Borish as Mikey Olshansky
- George Dzundza as Father Tom Grzelak (Season 1)
- Donna Murphy as Heather Olshansky (Season 1)
- Matt Czuchry as Jamie Farrel (Season 2)
- Jacqueline Torres as Liz Garza (Season 2)
- JoAnna Rhinehart as Deborah Washington
- Paul Adelstein as Aldo Rossi
- Bebe Neuwirth as Faith O'Connor (Season 1)
- Gregg Edelman as Ryan Ambrose
- Cindy Katz as Bettina Corwin
- Cameron Ball as Ashton Washington

== Production ==
The series was produced by The Thomas Carter Company, Pariah, Big Ticket Television and CBS Productions. David Morse said of his role as Olshansky; "I think I can really live with Olshansky. We can go a lot of places. And as an actor, being in this kind of production is pretty unheard of. I didn’t even think it was possible. To actually go home every day and see my kids is a great thing... I like being a dad. I like going to the grocery store and cooking every night." Filming took place on location in Philadelphia.

Hack would go on to become one of the last series to air on Saturdays in the United States for over a decade, as during the series' tenure, networks began to remove first-run scripted programming from the prime-time slot on Saturdays. (Note: Scripted programming returned to Saturdays in 2017 with the series Ransom, also on CBS.)

== Broadcast ==
The show also aired in the United Kingdom on ITV3, being only one of two original dramas to be shown on the channel's launch night on November 1, 2004. The final four episodes of the first season never aired on ITV3, as the network allowed the broadcast rights to lapse before they were shown; however, both seasons later aired in their entirety on CBS Drama and CBS Action, beginning with the first season on February 10, 2015. Episodes were broadcast weekdays at 10:00pm.

The series also in Australia on Network Ten, France on M6 and Russia on Fox Crime. In the United States, the series re-ran on Crime & Investigation, AXS TV, Universal TV and GetTV. On GetTV, episodes aired at 3:00 pm weekdays from April 24, 2017. Both series were also available for streaming on Netflix, but have since been removed.

== Release ==
On March 8, 2016, CBS Home Entertainment released Hack: Season 1 on DVD in Region 1 via Amazon.com's CreateSpace program. This is a Manufacture on Demand (MOD) release, available exclusively through Amazon.com.

== Episodes ==
Season	Episodes	Originally released	
Season	Episodes	First released	Last released
1	22	September 27, 2002	May 2, 2003
2	18	September 27, 2003	March 13, 2004

=== Season 1 (2002–03) ===
No. overall	No. in season	Title	Directed by	Written by	Original release date	Prod. code
1	1	"Pilot"	Thomas Carter	David Koepp	September 27, 2002	62032-001
A minister enlists Mike's help in finding his runaway daughter who may have been lured to Philadelphia by an Internet child predator.
2	2	"Favors"	Thomas Carter	David Koepp	October 4, 2002	62032-002
Mike helps a desperate gambler who owes money to a bookie, and Marcellus requests his old partner's help in tracking down a suspected killer.
3	3	"Domestic Disturbance"	David Platt	Lawrence Kaplow	October 11, 2002	62032-004
Mike sets a trap for an abusive policeman whose wife and daughter have fled the violence of their home environment and taken refuge at Saint Victor's, but finds that things are not as simple as they appear on the surface.
4	4	"My Alibi"	Michael Fields	Liz Friedman	October 18, 2002	62032-005
Mike is accused of a shooting, forcing Mikey into the uncomfortable position of lying on his behalf to provide him with an alibi - and prompting a stinging outburst from Grizz.
5	5	"My Brother's Keeper"	Harry Winer	Thomas L. Moran	October 25, 2002	62032-003
Mike decides his friend Vanessa's brother Teddy needs to get off drugs, and enlists Marcellus to help, convincing him they can kill two birds with one stone by nabbing a dealer at the same time, but their efforts ultimately prove fruitless.
6	6	"Slippery Slope"	Robert Singer	Frank Renzulli	November 1, 2002	62032-007
Mike takes a job working for a loan shark, but soon realises he is out of his depth.
7	7	"Husbands and Wives"	Fred Gerber	Story by : Lynne E. Litt & Liz Friedman & Lawrence Kaplow; Teleplay by : Thomas L. Moran & Leonard Dick	November 8, 2002	62032-009
Soon after taking a job driving for local gangster Jack Shannon, Mike realises he has made a big mistake and quits. His ex-boss attempts to entice him back by offering to call in a favour and restore his tarnished reputation.
8	8	"Songs in the Night"	Félix Enríquez Alcalá	Randy Anderson	November 15, 2002	62032-008
When a homeless man passes away in the back of Olshansky's taxi, the cabbie decides to locate his family.
9	9	"Bad Choices"	Philip Sgriccia	Leonard Dick	November 22, 2002	62032-006
Mike helps a naked man find the prostitute who robbed him of his clothes, money and wedding ring.
10	10	"All Night Long"	Elodie Keene	Eugenie Ross-Leming & Brad Buckner	December 6, 2002	62032-010
Mike endures a hectic night when he tries to return $10,000 to a man who left it in the back of a taxi, having accepted the money to help an immigrant mother find her lost child.
11	11	"Obsession"	Fred Gerber	Liz Friedman & Thomas L. Moran	December 20, 2002	62032-011
A woman enlists Mike as a bodyguard, explaining that she is being followed - though her stalker has never been seen. The couple begin an illicit affair, but when the former cop decides it has to end, someone takes a shot at him.
12	12	"A Dangerous Game"	Dan Lerner	George Schenck & Frank Cardea	January 10, 2003	62032-012
Mike tries to help a Department of Justice employee whose sister has been kidnapped by a hitman seeking information about a banker in the witness protection programme, who is a key part of the prosecution's case against a money-laundering drug dealer.
13	13	"Death of Innocence"	Philip Sgriccia	Story by : Lynne E. Litt & Leonard Dick; Teleplay by : Lynne E. Litt & Lawrence Kaplow	January 17, 2003	62032-013
Mike's attempts to mend fences with his father meet with a cool reception and Marcellus's new partner takes some getting used to.
14	14	"Forgive, But Don't Forget"	Bobby Roth	David Ehrman	January 31, 2003	62032-014
Mike realises the importance of spending more time with his son in the wake of the divorce, while Grizz is surprised by the reappearance of an old flame and Marcellus gets a golden opportunity to put his corrupt behaviour behind him.
15	15	"Brothers in Arms"	Alex Zakrzewski	Brad Buckner & Eugenie Ross-Leming	February 7, 2003	62032-015
Marcellus and his team search for Mike's kidnapper, who is threatening to kill his captive at the same time as his brother is executed by the state.
16	16	"Black Eye"	David Jones	Steven Smith	February 14, 2003	62032-016
Mike rekindles a high school romance while trying to help an old flame's schizophrenic sister.
17	17	"Third Strike"	Kristoffer Tabori	George Schenck & Frank Cardea	February 21, 2003	62032-017
A parolee who witnessed a murder tells Mike that the police have arrested an innocent man, sending him on the trail of the real killer.
18	18	"Sinners and Saints"	Bill Norton	Liz Friedman	March 14, 2003	62032-018
Heather asks Mike to investigate when a doctor attempts to cover up an error which caused a patient's death and the hospital refuses to take disciplinary action. However, the accusations lose Heather her job and Mike must face the prospect of her moving away with their son.
19	19	"Signature"	Michael Zinberg	Lynne E. Litt	April 4, 2003	62032-019
Mike incurs his father's wrath when he enlists Marcellus' help in an attempt to free a man he wrongly sent to prison. He also has mixed feelings when he learns that Heather is dating Ryan, who is lavishing fatherly affection on Mikey.
20	20	"All Others Pay Cash"	Philip Sgriccia	David Ehrman	April 18, 2003	62032-020
Mike takes care of his ailing father, while Grizz's growing attraction to Beth, coupled with what he sees as the bishop's lack of confidence and support, prompts him to consider leaving the priesthood.
21	21	"True Lies"	Fred Gerber	Thomas L. Moran	April 25, 2003	62032-021
As Mike's trial date draws nearer, he investigates allegations that Marcellus had been accepting bribes for years.
22	22	"The Squeeze"	Robert Singer	Lawrence Kaplow	May 2, 2003	62032-022
Despite Marcellus's recent betrayals, Mike agrees to help him find out why he's being framed for murder.

=== Season 2 (2003–04) ===
No. overall	No. in season	Title	Directed by	Written by	Original release date	Prod. code
23	1	"See No Evil"	Robert Singer	Eugenie Ross-Leming & Brad Buckner	September 27, 2003	62032-023
Mike hopes moving house will help him make a fresh start, but soon finds himself helping a man who witnessed a quadruple murder committed by federal agents.
24	2	"Hidden Agenda"	Philip Sgriccia	David Ehrman	October 4, 2003	62032-026
Mike and Marcellus help an innocent man falsely accused of being a terrorist by a rogue FBI agent - but Jamie's well-meaning efforts jeopardise everything.
25	3	"Presumed Guilty"	David Platt	George Schenck & Frank Cardea	October 11, 2003	62032-024
Mike agrees to help clear the name of a man wrongly accused of murder, while Marcellus undergoes minor surgery - and ends up getting shot.
26	4	"Collateral Damage"	Michael Zinberg	Steven Smith	October 18, 2003	62032-025
Mike manages to identify the man responsible for shooting Marcellus, but the case takes a further deadly twist when another attempt is made on his friend's life.
27	5	"Out of the Ashes"	Kristoffer Tabori	Liz Friedman	October 25, 2003	62032-027
A traumatised woman sets out to track down and kill the gang who attempted to rape her, convinced it's the only way to prevent them carrying out further attacks.
28	6	"My Fare Lady"	Robert Singer	Eugenie Ross-Leming & Brad Buckner	November 1, 2003	62032-028
Mike falls in love with a woman who lost her memory following an attempt on her life and helps her piece together the details of her past. Meanwhile, Jamie poses as Marcellus for an online flirtation.
29	7	"The Looking Glass"	Ed Bianchi	Lawrence Kaplow	November 8, 2003	62032-029
On the anniversary of his brother's death, Jamie meets with Richard in an attempt at reconciliation - but instead finds himself investigating the murder of his estranged father's lover. Mike tries to discover what evidence Marcellus has on the homicide without revealing Richard's affair.
30	8	"Blind Faith"	Rick Rosenthal	David Ehrman	November 15, 2003	62032-030
A murder witness asks Mike to protect her from a crooked cop determined to ensure she never testifies, and Marcellus moves out of the family home as his marital problems continue.
31	9	"To Have and Have Not"	Rod Hardy	Steven Smith	November 22, 2003	62032-031
Mike tries to help a teenage prostitute escape the clutches of her pimp, and when Liz is reluctant to help, Jamie tries to convince her otherwise. Marcellus strikes a deal with a loan shark to arrest his competition in return for Cal's release from his crew.
32	10	"Dial 'O' for Murder"	Chad Lowe	George Schenck & Frank Cardea	December 13, 2003	62032-032
Liz asks Mike to investigate the death of her firefighter friend's girlfriend, which leads him into a confrontation with an old enemy.
33	11	"Gone"	Philip Sgriccia	David Morse	December 20, 2003	62032-033
An assassin with a grudge against Mike returns to Philadelphia and takes Mike Jnr hostage. In exchange for the boy, he wants the ex-cop to locate his next target - a Russian mob boss who's gone into hiding. In desperation, he turns to Marcellus for help, while Liz combs the scene of the kidnapping for clues.
34	12	"Calibrated Arguments"	David Straiton	Lawrence Kaplow & Liz Friedman	January 17, 2004	62032-034
Mike becomes a local hero after killing a mugger in self-defence, but struggles to come to terms with his new-found notoriety. Matters are only made worse when the mother of his attacker decides to sue him. Jamie starts a new job, but worries it is too dangerous and begins carrying a gun during his shifts.
35	13	"Double Exposure"	Vincent Misiano	Eugenie Ross-Leming & Brad Buckner	January 24, 2004	62032-035
Marcellus learns his wife Deborah has been seeing another man, and Mike investigates claims that some police officers are failing to take action over a spate of hate crimes against homosexuals.
36	14	"Fog of War"	Philip Sgriccia	David Ehrman	February 7, 2004	62032-036
Mike pulls out all the stops to help his suicidal cousin, a war veteran suffering from post-traumatic stress disorder.
37	15	"Extreme Commerce"	Chad Lowe	Steven Smith	February 14, 2004	62032-037
Mike reluctantly agrees to help Liz track down an ex-client's missing child and uncovers an illegal adoption ring trafficking stolen babies. Marcellus realises his jealousy toward his ex-wife's new lover has got out of hand.
38	16	"Misty Blue"	J. Miller Tobin	George Schenck & Frank Cardea	February 28, 2004	62032-039
Mike discovers one of his passengers has left her mobile phone in his cab and sets out to return her property - only to discover the owner has mysteriously disappeared.
39	17	"One for My Baby"	Robert Singer	Mary Hanes	March 6, 2004	62032-038
Olshansky reminisces about a case where he searched for a missing hospital patient who disappeared while suffering with an inoperable brain tumour, only to learn that the man's wife was having an affair with her husband's doctor.
40	18	"The Reckoning"	Jim Pohl	Story by : Lawrence Kaplow & Liz Friedman; Teleplay by : Lawrence Kaplow and Brad Buckner & Eugenie Ross-Leming	March 13, 2004	62032-040
A drug dealer convicted on Mike and Marcellus's trumped-up evidence is released from prison and comes looking for revenge, endangering Liz and Jamie.
