= David Shore =

Canadian television writer (born 1959)

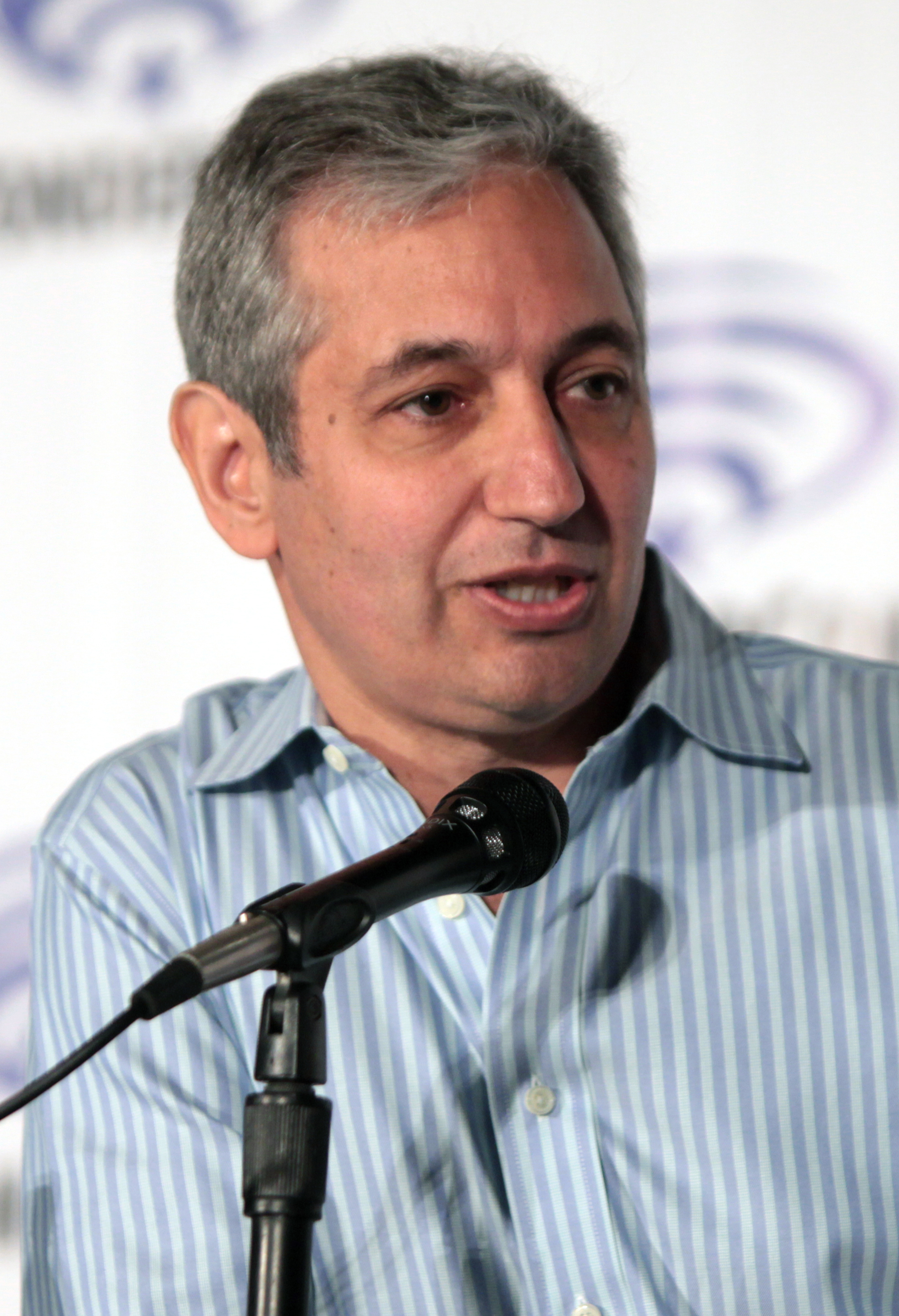
- Shore at the 2016 WonderCon
- Born: David Ian Shore; July 3, 1959 (age 67); London, Ontario, Canada
- Education: The University of Western Ontario; University of Toronto
- Occupations: Writer; director; producer
- Spouse: Judy
- Children: 3
- Relatives: Raphael Shore (brother); Marvin Shore (father)

David Ian Shore (born July 3, 1959) is a Canadian television writer. Shore worked on Family Law, NYPD Blue and Due South. He created the series House and co-created Battle Creek with Vince Gilligan. Shore adapted the South Korean series The Good Doctor into an American show with the same name.

== Early life ==
Shore was born in London, Ontario, Canada, to Cecile Shore and Marvin Shore, a politician. His younger twin brothers, Ephraim Shore and Raphael Shore, are Aish HaTorah rabbis.

After graduating from A. B. Lucas Secondary School with distinction, he subsequently attended the University of Western Ontario for an undergraduate degree, and the University of Toronto for his law degree in 1982. Following his education he initially worked as a municipal and corporate lawyer in his native Canada before he moved to Los Angeles to break into television.

On June 20, 2018, Shore received an honorary degree in law from the University of Western Ontario.

== Career ==
=== Television ===
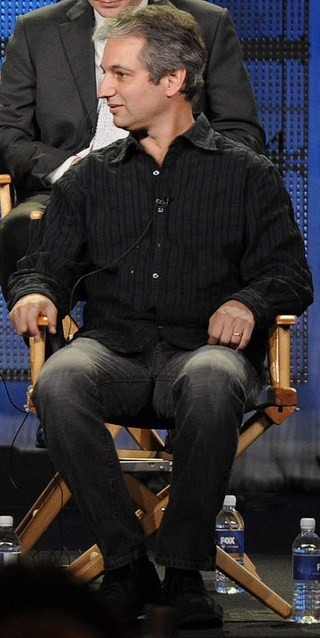
Shore in 2009

Shore wrote for the television series Due South — about another Canadian transplanted in America, albeit a member of the Royal Canadian Mounted Police — before he became a producer on the ABC drama NYPD Blue. His work on that series was nominated for two Emmy Awards.

Shore moved on to the series Family Law, Hack, and Century City, but these were not commercial successes.

==== House ====
In 2003, producer Paul Attanasio — who had previously worked with NBC on such shows as Homicide: Life on the Street and Gideon's Crossing — approached Shore to request a procedural, as he knew the network was looking for another one to follow up on the success of Law & Order and to imitate CBS's success with CSI and NCIS. Attanasio's idea was to apply the police procedural genre to a show about medicine. While in most procedurals the characters are secondary to the mystery, Shore decided that a medical procedural should place the mystery secondary to the hero. He therefore conceived of a hero similar to the iconic detective Sherlock Holmes.

That hero was Dr. Gregory House, the main character of House, played (with an American accent) by the British actor, comedian, and musician Hugh Laurie. Although NBC took a pass on the series, Fox picked it up, and by the end of the first season, it was their biggest new hit of 2004–05. Shore wrote or co-wrote five episodes of that first season, including its pilot and the Season One pre-finale, "Three Stories", in which he intricately wove the stories of three patients, while also revealing the reason for Dr. House's limp and Vicodin addiction. The latter of these won the 2005 Emmy for Outstanding Writing for a Drama Series. Shore made his directorial debut on the series House directing the Season Two finale "No Reason". Due to the success of House, Shore was granted a generous contract for fourth, fifth, and sixth seasons. The sixth season began with a two-hour season premiere titled "Broken", which he co-wrote. Shore and his co-writers won the Writers Guild of America Award for episodic drama at the February 2010 ceremony for the premiere.

House was renewed for a seventh season, which began airing on September 20, 2010, as well as an eighth and final season.

==== After House ====
In 2009, Shore finished production of the short-lived police TV show Winters starring Famke Janssen.

In February 2013, Entertainment Weekly reported that Shore would write for an upcoming ABC television show titled Doubt, about "a 'charming low-rent' lawyer battling his demons" starring Steve Coogan.

In August, 2015, Amazon Video released a pilot episode for Sneaky Pete, a show Shore and Bryan Cranston created. The first season of Sneaky Pete was exclusively released in its entirety on Amazon Video on January 13, 2017.

In 2019, as WGA co-chair, Shore joined forces with WGA members in firing their agents as part of the WGA's stand against the ATA and the practice of packaging. In May 2021, he and his Shore Z Productions company renewed his first look deal with Sony.

== Filmography ==
The numbers in directing and writing credits refer to the number of episodes.

Key
†	Denotes television programs that have not yet aired.

Title	Year	Credited as				Network	Notes
Title	Year	Creator	Director	Writer	Executive producer	Network	Notes
The Untouchables	1994	No	No	Yes (1)	No	Syndication	
Due South	1994–98	No	Yes (1)	Yes (7)	No	CTV	Program consultant (season 1: 8 episodes); Story editor (season 1: 14 episodes)
The Hardy Boys	1995	No	No	Yes (1)	No	Syndication	
Traders	1996	No	No	Yes (5)	No	Global Television Network	Supervising producer (season 1)
The Practice	1997	No	No	Yes (2)	No	ABC	Story editor (season 1); Executive story editor (season 1: 5 episodes, season 2)
NYPD Blue	1997	No	No	Yes (1)	No	ABC	
Law & Order	1997–99	No	No	Yes (7)	No	NBC	Producer (season 8); Supervising producer (season 9)
The Hunger	1997	No	No	Yes (1)	No	Sci Fi Channel; The Movie Network	Anthology series
The Outer Limits	1997	No	No	Yes (1)	No	Showtime	Anthology series
Beggars and Choosers	1999–2000	No	No	Yes (4)	No	Showtime	Consulting producer (season 1)
Family Law	1999–2002	No	No	Yes (21)	Yes	CBS	Executive producer (Pilot, seasons 2–3); Co-executive producer (season 1)
Hack	2002–04	No	No	No	Yes	CBS	
Century City	2004	No	No	Yes (1)	No	CBS	Consulting producer (8 episodes)
House	2004–12	Yes	Yes (2)	Yes (19)	Yes	Fox	
The Rockford Files	2010	Yes	No	No	Yes	NBC	Unsold pilot
Doubt	2013	Yes	No	Yes	Yes	ABC	Unsold pilot
Battle Creek	2015	Yes	No	Yes (4)	Yes	CBS	
Sneaky Pete	2015	Yes	No	Yes	Yes	Amazon Prime Video	Left the project after the initial Pilot.
Houdini & Doyle	2016	No	No	No	Yes	Fox; ITV; Global	
The Good Doctor	2017–2024	Developer	Yes (3)	Yes (15)	Yes	ABC	
Accused	2023–2024	No	No	No	Yes	Fox	Anthology series

== Awards and nominations ==
Year	Award	Category	Nominee(s)	Result	Ref.
2005	Primetime Emmy Award	Outstanding Writing for a Drama Series	David Shore (For House, S01E21 – "Three Stories")	Won	
2018	Humanitas Prize	60-Minute Category	David Shore (For The Good Doctor, S01E01 – "Burnt Food")	Won	
