= List of awards and nominations received by House =

House
Awards and nominations
Award	Wins	Nominations
AFI Awards	1	1
Artios Awards	0	3
ASC Awards	0	2
Australian Film Institute Awards	0	1
British Academy Television Awards	0	1
BMI Film & TV Awards	7	7
C.A.S. Awards	0	2
CoLA	1	1
DGA Awards	0	1
Edgar Allan Poe Awards	0	1
Golden Globe Awards	2	9
Golden Nymph	1	1
Golden Reel Awards	3	7
Goldene Kamera	1	1
HPA Award	0	1
Humanitas Prize	2	7
Lupus Research Institute Loop Awards	1	1
NAACP Image Awards	3	12
Primetime Emmy Awards	5	25
Peabody Awards	1	1
PEN Literary Awards	0	1
People's Choice Awards	9	13
Premios Ondas	1	1
PGA Awards	0	2
Prism Awards	1	10
Saturn Awards	0	1
Satellite Awards	5	7
Screen Actors Guild Awards	2	7
SOC Awards	0	1
Teen Choice Awards	1	16
TCA Awards	2	7
TP de Oro Awards	3	5
WGA Awards	2	4
Young Artist Awards	2	9

Totals (Note: Certain award groups do not simply award one winner. They acknowledge several different recipients, have runners-up, and have third place. Since this is a specific recognition and is different from losing an award, runner-up mentions are considered wins in this award tally. For simplification and to avoid errors, each award in this list has been presumed to have had a prior nomination.)
- Wins: 56
- Nominations: 169

House is an American television medical drama that originally ran on the Fox network for eight seasons, from November 16, 2004 to May 21, 2012. The show centers around Dr. Gregory House (Hugh Laurie), a drug-addicted, unconventional, misanthropic medical genius who leads a team of diagnosticians at the fictional hospital in New Jersey. Throughout its run, the show has been widely popular with audiences, and has been well received by the critics community.

As a result, by the end of its run, the show had been nominated 169 times for awards presented by American organizations, including at least ten times each for the Primetime Emmy Awards, Teen Choice Awards, People's Choice Awards, NAACP Image Awards, and Prism Awards. It won the awards a total of 56 times, which included multiple wins also at the Golden Globe Awards, Young Artist Awards, BMI Film & TV Awards, Satellite Awards, Golden Reel Awards, TCA Awards, Screen Actors Guild Awards, Humanitas Prizes, and WGA Awards.

The show has been very successful internationally also, being aired in 2008 in a total of 66 countries, and with audience of over 81.8 million worldwide, it was the most watched television show on the globe that year. As a result, it received ten nominations for international awards, including once for a BAFTA TV Award (U.K.) and for a Golden Nymph (won, Monaco).

Hugh Laurie, who portrays the title character, has been nominated for an award 38 times, winning 14 of them. Omar Epps has been nominated eight times, winning three awards, while Olivia Wilde has been nominated five times for an award. Besides the show's cast members, the writers and producers of the show have also been nominated for various awards; writer, show-runner, executive producer and director David Shore, has received ten nominations for his work on the show, winning three times.

== Emmy Awards ==
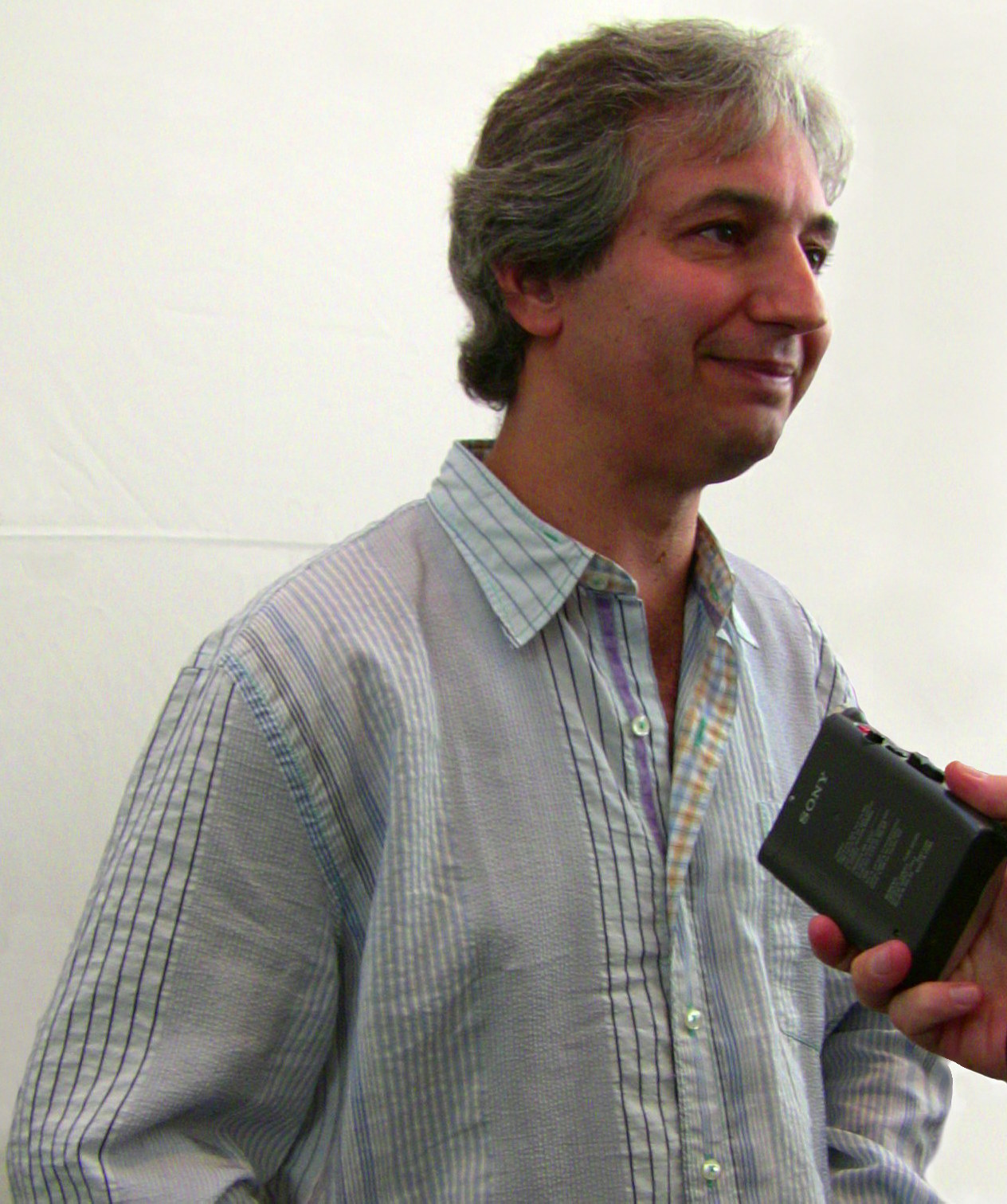
David Shore has won one Emmy Award in 2005.

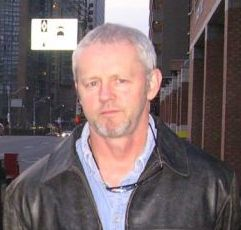
David Morse has received one Emmy Award nomination in 2007.

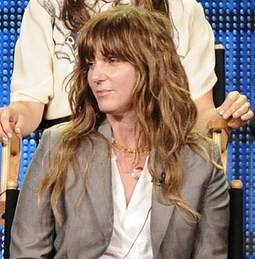
Katie Jacobs was co-nominated for an Emmy Award twice.

The Emmy Awards have been awarded annually since 1949 by the Academy of Television Arts & Sciences to honor excellence in television. They are considered to be one of the four major awards in America for the performing arts — together with the Academy Awards (film), Tony Awards (theatre) and Grammy Awards (music). House has been nominated for Primetime Emmy Awards, which are given to honor excellence in acting and writing in primetime television, as well as Creative Arts Emmys, which are presented in recognition of technical and other related areas in American television programming.

After its first season run in 2005, House received five Emmy Award nominations, of which three were for Creative Arts Emmys. It failed to gain a nomination for Outstanding Drama Series but did, however, win the award for Outstanding Writing for a Drama Series. The show did get nominated for Outstanding Drama Series in 2006, 2007, 2008, and 2009, but did not manage to win the award in either of these four nominations. In 2006 House was nominated for four Emmys, but failed to win. Next year, the show received four nominations, and won a Creative Arts Emmy for make-up. The following year, at the 60th Primetime Emmy Awards, the show, again, received four nominations but only received one Primetime Emmy Award, for director Greg Yaitanes for Outstanding Directing in a Drama Series. House received another three nominations in 2009 and in 2010, and two more nominations in 2011. However, it only won two Creative Arts Emmy Awards for sound mixing in 2009 and 2011, and failed to win any nominations altogether in 2012 for its final season.

Hugh Laurie, who portrays the title character has been nominated for the Primetime Emmy Award for Outstanding Lead Actor in a Drama Series for every season except the second and the last one. Despite the six nominations, Laurie has never won the award, which has been regarded by some critics in the entertainment industry as among the biggest snubs in the award's history.

=== Primetime Emmy Awards ===
Year	Category	Nominee(s)	Episode	Result
2005	Outstanding Lead Actor in a Drama Series	Hugh Laurie	"Detox"	Nominated
2005	Outstanding Writing for a Drama Series	David Shore	"Three Stories"	Won
2006	Outstanding Drama Series	^{See below}	N/A	Nominated
2007	Outstanding Drama Series	^{See below}	"Half-Wit"	Nominated
2007	Outstanding Lead Actor in a Drama Series	Hugh Laurie	"Half-Wit"	Nominated
2007	Outstanding Guest Actor in a Drama Series	David Morse	"Finding Judas"	Nominated
2008	Outstanding Drama Series	^{See below}	"Frozen"	Nominated
2008	Outstanding Lead Actor in a Drama Series	Hugh Laurie	"House's Head"	Nominated
2008	Outstanding Directing in a Drama Series	Greg Yaitanes	"House's Head"	Won
2009	Outstanding Drama Series	^{See below}	N/A	Nominated
2009	Outstanding Lead Actor in a Drama Series	Hugh Laurie	"Under My Skin"	Nominated
2010	Outstanding Lead Actor in a Drama Series	Hugh Laurie	"Broken"	Nominated
2011	Outstanding Lead Actor in a Drama Series	Hugh Laurie	"After Hours"	Nominated

^2006 "Outstanding Drama Series" Nominees: Katie Jacobs, David Shore, Bryan Singer, Thomas L. Moran, Russel Friend, Garrett Lerner, Doris Egan, David Semel, Matt Witten, Gerrit van der Meer & Lawrence Kaplow.
^2007, 2008 and 2009 "Outstanding Drama Series" Nominees: David Shore, Katie Jacobs, Paul Attanasio, Bryan Singer, Daniel Sackheim, Russel Friend, Garrett Lerner, Thomas L. Moran, Doris Egan, Lawrence Kaplow, Gerrit van der Meer, Peter Blake & Leonard Dick.

=== Creative Arts Emmys ===
Year	Category	Nominee(s)	Episode(s)	Result
2005	Outstanding Music Composition for a Series (Dramatic Underscore)	Christopher Hoag	"Pilot"	Nominated
2005	Outstanding Main Title Design	Matt Mulder, Jake Sargeant, Dan Brown & Dave Molloy	N/A	Nominated
2005	Outstanding Casting for a Drama Series	Amy Lippens	N/A	Nominated
2006	Outstanding Single-Camera Sound Mixing for a Series	Gerry Lentz, Rich Weingart & Russell C. Fager	"Euphoria (Part 1)"	Nominated
2006	Outstanding Casting for a Drama Series	Amy Lippens & Stephanie Laffin	N/A	Nominated
2006	Outstanding Art Direction for a Single-Camera Series	Derek R. Hill & Danielle Berman	"Autopsy", "Distractions" & "Skin Deep"	Nominated
2007	Outstanding Prosthetic Makeup for a Series, Miniseries, Movie or a Special	Dalia Dokter, Jamie Kelman & Ed French	"Que Sera Sera"	Won
2008	Outstanding Music Composition For A Series (original Dramatic Score)	Jon Ehrlich & Jason Derlatka	"Guardian Angels"	Nominated
2009	Outstanding Sound Mixing For A Comedy Or Drama Series (one Hour)	Von Varga, Richard Weingart & Gerry Lentz	"House Divided"	Won
2010	Outstanding Sound Mixing For A Comedy Or Drama Series (one Hour)	Von Varga, Juan Cisneros, Rich Weingart & Gerry Lentz	"Epic Fail"	Nominated
2010	Outstanding Stunt Coordination	Jim Vickers	"Brave Heart"	Nominated
2011	Outstanding Sound Mixing For A Comedy Or Drama Series (one Hour)	Von Varga, Juan Cisneros, Joseph DeAngelis & Brad North	"Bombshells"	Won

== BMI Film & TV Awards ==
The BMI Film & TV Awards are presented annually by Broadcast Music Incorporated to the composers of music featured in successful films, TV series and programs. Three composers from House, Robert Del Naja, Grant Marshall and Andrew Vowles, have received the award every year between 2005 and 2011.

Year	Category	Nominees	Result
2005	Television Music Award	Robert Del Naja, Grant Marshall & Andrew Vowles	Won
2006	Television Music Award	Robert Del Naja, Grant Marshall & Andrew Vowles	Won
2007	Television Music Award	Robert Del Naja, Grant Marshall & Andrew Vowles	Won
2008	Television Music Award	Robert Del Naja, Grant Marshall & Andrew Vowles	Won
2009	Television Music Award	Robert Del Naja, Grant Marshall & Andrew Vowles	Won
2010	Television Music Award	Robert Del Naja, Grant Marshall & Andrew Vowles	Won
2011	Television Music Award	Robert Del Naja, Grant Marshall & Andrew Vowles	Won

== Golden Globe Awards ==
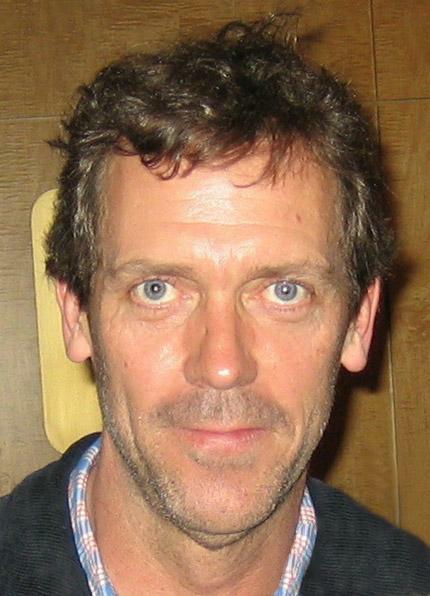
Hugh Laurie has won two Golden Globes and was nominated four more times.

The Golden Globe Awards are awarded annually by the Hollywood Foreign Press Association "to honor the best achievements in film and television." House has been nominated for a total of nine. The show has won two Golden Globes, which were for Hugh Laurie in the Best Performance by an Actor in a Television Series – Drama category in 2006 and 2007. Laurie has been nominated four more times between 2008 and 2011, while the series was also nominated in the category Best Drama Series in 2008, 2009, and 2010.

Year	Category	Nominee	Result
2006	Best Performance by an Actor in a Television Series – Drama	Hugh Laurie	Won
2007	Best Performance by an Actor in a Television Series – Drama	Hugh Laurie	Won
2008	Best Performance by an Actor in a Television Series – Drama	Hugh Laurie	Nominated
2008	Best Television Series – Drama	N/A	Nominated
2009	Best Performance by an Actor in a Television Series – Drama	Hugh Laurie	Nominated
2009	Best Television Series – Drama	N/A	Nominated
2010	Best Performance by an Actor in a Television Series – Drama	Hugh Laurie	Nominated
2010	Best Television Series – Drama	N/A	Nominated
2011	Best Performance by an Actor in a Television Series – Drama	Hugh Laurie	Nominated

== Golden Reel Awards ==
The Golden Reel Awards are presented annually by the Motion Picture Sound Editors to sound editors. House has been nominated in various categories seven times, and has won three.

Year	Category	Nominee(s)	Episode	Result
2005	Best Sound Editing in Television Short Form – Sound Effects & Foley	Barbara Issak, Craig Rosevear & Brad North	"Paternity"	Nominated
2006	Best Sound Editing in Television Short Form – Dialogue and Automated Dialogue Replacement	Barbara Issak, Brad North & Jackie Oster	"Autopsy"	Won
2008	Best Sound Editing: Dialogue and ADR for Short Form Television	Brad North, Jackie Oster, Tiffany S. Griffith, Alex Parker & Kirk Herzbrun	"Human Error"	Won
2010	Best Sound Editing – Short Form Sound Effects and Foley in Television	^{See below}	"Epic Fail"	Won
2010	Best Sound Editing – Long Form Dialogue and ADR in Television	Brad North, Jackie Oster	"Broken"	Nominated
2010	Best Sound Editing – Best Sound Editing: Long Form Sound Effects and Foley in Television	Brad North, Luis Galdames, Rich Thomas, Michael Lyle, Paul Stevenson & Matt Mondrick	"Broken"	Nominated
2012	Best Sound Editing in Television Short Form – Sound Effects & Foley	^{See below}	"Bombshells"	Nominated

^2010 "Short Form Sound Effects and Foley in Television" Nominees: Craig Rosevear, Matthew Mondrick, Luis Galdames, Kirk Herzbrun, Alex Parker, Paul Stevenson, Harry Woolway, Michael Lyle, Rich Weingart & Brad North.

^2012 "Best Sound Editing in Television Short Form – Sound Effects & Foley" Nominees: Kirk Herzbrun, Alex Parker, Matthew Mondrick, Joe DeAngelis, Harry Woolway, Paul Stevenson, Brad North, Craig Rosevear, Luis Galdames & Michael Lyle.

== Humanitas Prizes ==
The Humanitas Prizes are awarded each year for film and television writing intended to promote human dignity, meaning, and freedom. House has been nominated six times for the 60 Minute Teleplay category and has won once. In 2012, the show received the Goodbye with Love Humanitas Prize, being the first recipient of this new award honoring long-running series that have ended.

Year	Category	Nominee(s)	Episode	Result
2005	60 Minute Teleplay	David Shore	"Everybody Lies"	Nominated
2005	60 Minute Teleplay	Sara B. Cooper	"Damned If You Do"	Nominated
2006	60 Minute Teleplay	David Shore	"Three Stories"	Won
2007	60 Minute Teleplay	Doris Egan	"House vs. God"	Nominated
2009	60 Minute Teleplay	David Hoselton	"Unfaithful"	Nominated
2011	60 Minute Teleplay	Russel Friend, Garrett Lerner & Peter Blake	"Help Me"	Nominated
2012	Goodbye with Love	David Shore	N/A	Won

== NAACP Image Awards ==
The NAACP Image Awards are presented annually by the American National Association for the Advancement of Colored People to honor outstanding people of color in film, television, music, and literature. The show has received 12 nominations in total, including seven for Omar Epps in the "Outstanding Actor in a Drama Series" and the "Outstanding Supporting Actor in a Drama Series" categories.

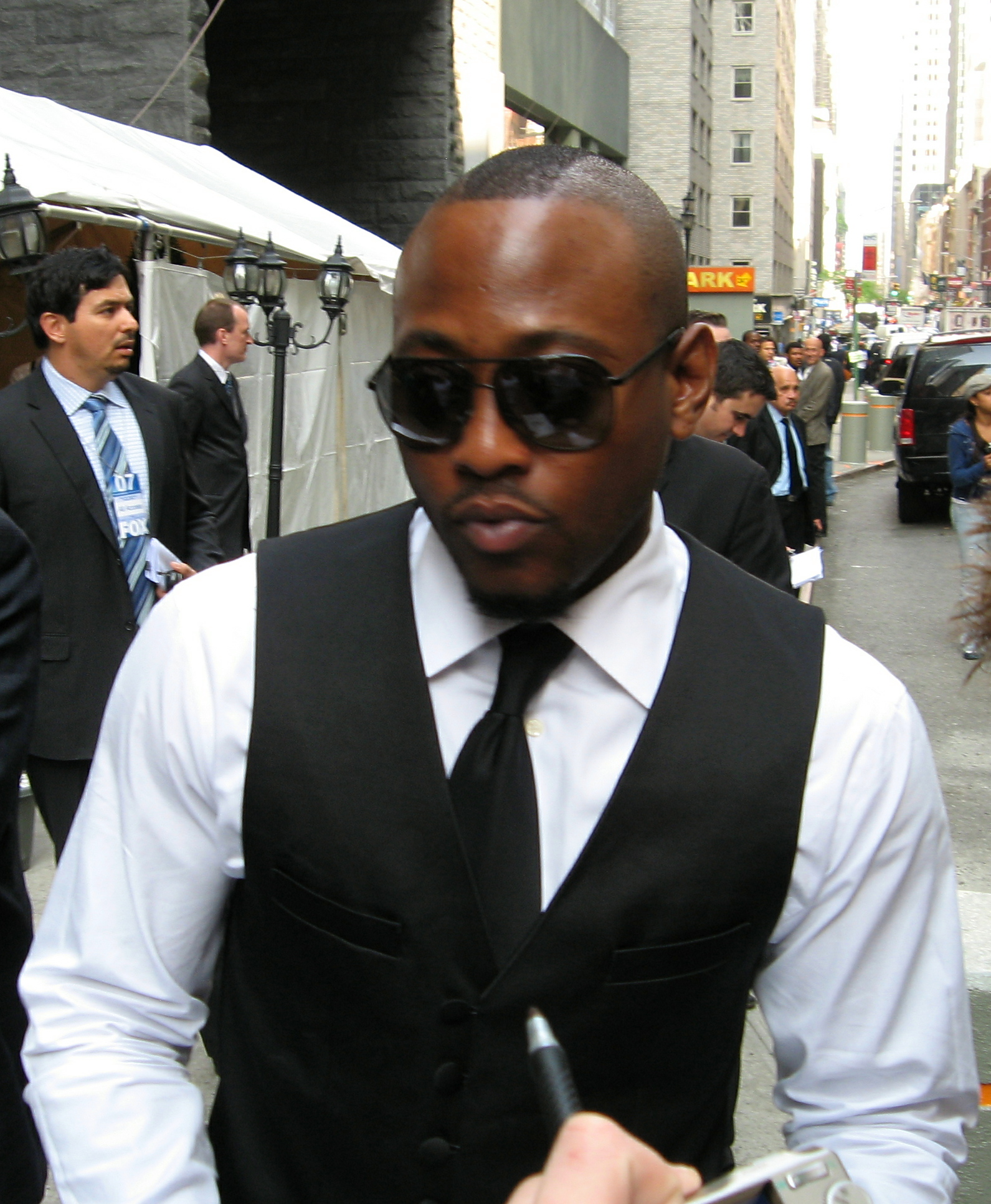
Omar Epps has received seven NAACP Image Award nominations and has won three.

Year	Category	Nominee(s)	Result
2005	Outstanding Supporting Actor in a Drama Series	Omar Epps	Nominated
2006	Outstanding Actor in a Drama Series	Omar Epps	Nominated
2006	Outstanding Drama Series	N/A	Nominated
2007	Outstanding Supporting Actor in a Drama Series	Omar Epps	Won
2008	Outstanding Drama Series	N/A	Nominated
2008	Outstanding Supporting Actor in a Drama Series	Omar Epps	Won
2009	Outstanding Actor in a Drama Series	Omar Epps	Nominated
2009	Outstanding Drama Series	N/A	Nominated
2009	Outstanding Writing in a Dramatic Series	Liz Friedman & Sara Hess for episode: "Lucky Thirteen"	Nominated
2010	Outstanding Writing in a Dramatic Series	Sara Hess for episode: "The Greater Good"	Nominated
2012	Outstanding Supporting Actor in a Dramatic Series	Omar Epps	Nominated
2013	Outstanding Supporting Actor in a Dramatic Series	Omar Epps	Won

== People's Choice Awards ==
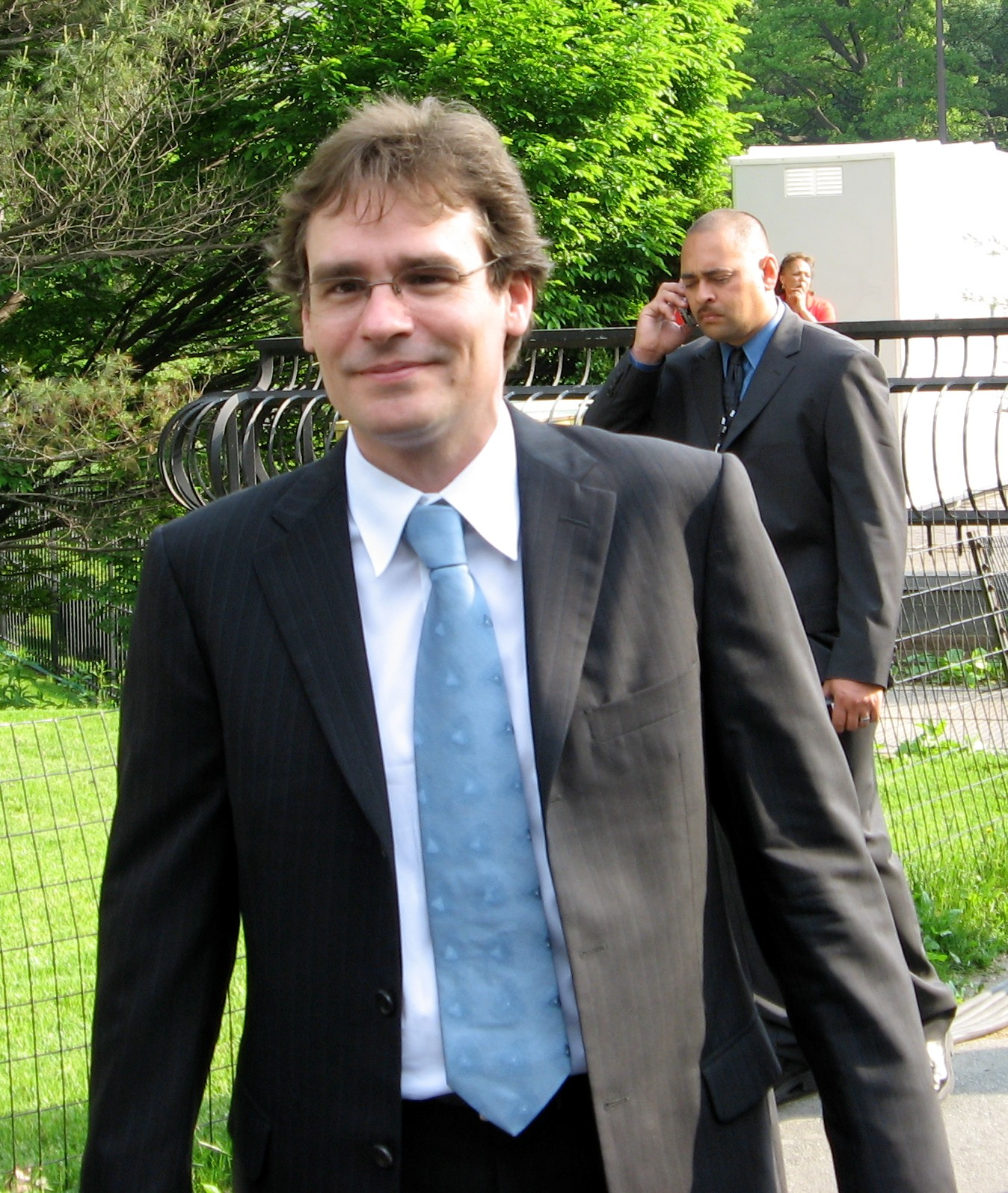
Robert Sean Leonard was nominated for a People's Choice Award in 2011.

The People's Choice Awards are voted by fans online to recognize the people and the work of popular culture. House has received 13 nominations, winning nine.

Year	Category	Nominee	Result
2007	Favorite TV Drama	N/A	Nominated
2008	Favorite TV Drama	N/A	Won
2009	Favorite TV Drama	N/A	Won
2009	Favorite Male TV Star	Hugh Laurie	Won
2010	Favorite TV Drama	N/A	Won
2010	Favorite Male TV Star	Hugh Laurie	Won
2011	Favorite TV Drama	N/A	Won
2011	Favorite TV Drama Actor	Hugh Laurie	Won
2011	Favorite TV Drama Actress	Lisa Edelstein	Won
2011	Favorite TV Doctor	Hugh Laurie	Won
2011	Favorite TV Doctor	Robert Sean Leonard	Nominated
2012	Favorite TV Drama	N/A	Nominated
2012	Favorite TV Drama Actor	Hugh Laurie	Nominated

== Prism Awards ==
The PRISM Awards are awarded annually by the Entertainment Industries Council to honor artists for accurate portrayal of substance abuse, addiction and mental health in entertainment programming. House has been nominated ten times, winning in 2007 for "TV Drama Series Multi-Episode Storyline".

Year	Category	Nominee(s)	Result
2006	Performance in a Drama Series Episode	Hugh Laurie	Nominated
2006	TV Drama Episode	"Hunting"	Nominated
2007	TV Drama Series Multi-Episode Storyline	House’s Addiction for episodes: "Fools for Love”, ”Que Sera Sera”, ”Finding Judas”, ”Merry Little Christmas"	Won
2007	Performance in a Drama Series, Multi-Episode Storyline	Hugh Laurie	Nominated
2008	Drama Series Multi-Episode Storyline	“Words and Deeds” & “One Day, One Room”	Nominated
2010	Performance in a Drama Episode	Hugh Laurie	Nominated
2010	Drama Series – Mental Health	"Simple Explanation"	Nominated
2011	Drama Series – Mental Health	"Massage Therapy"	Nominated
2012	Drama Series Episode – Substance Use	"After Hours"	Nominated
2012	Drama Series Episode – Substance Use	"The Fix"	Nominated

== Satellite Awards ==
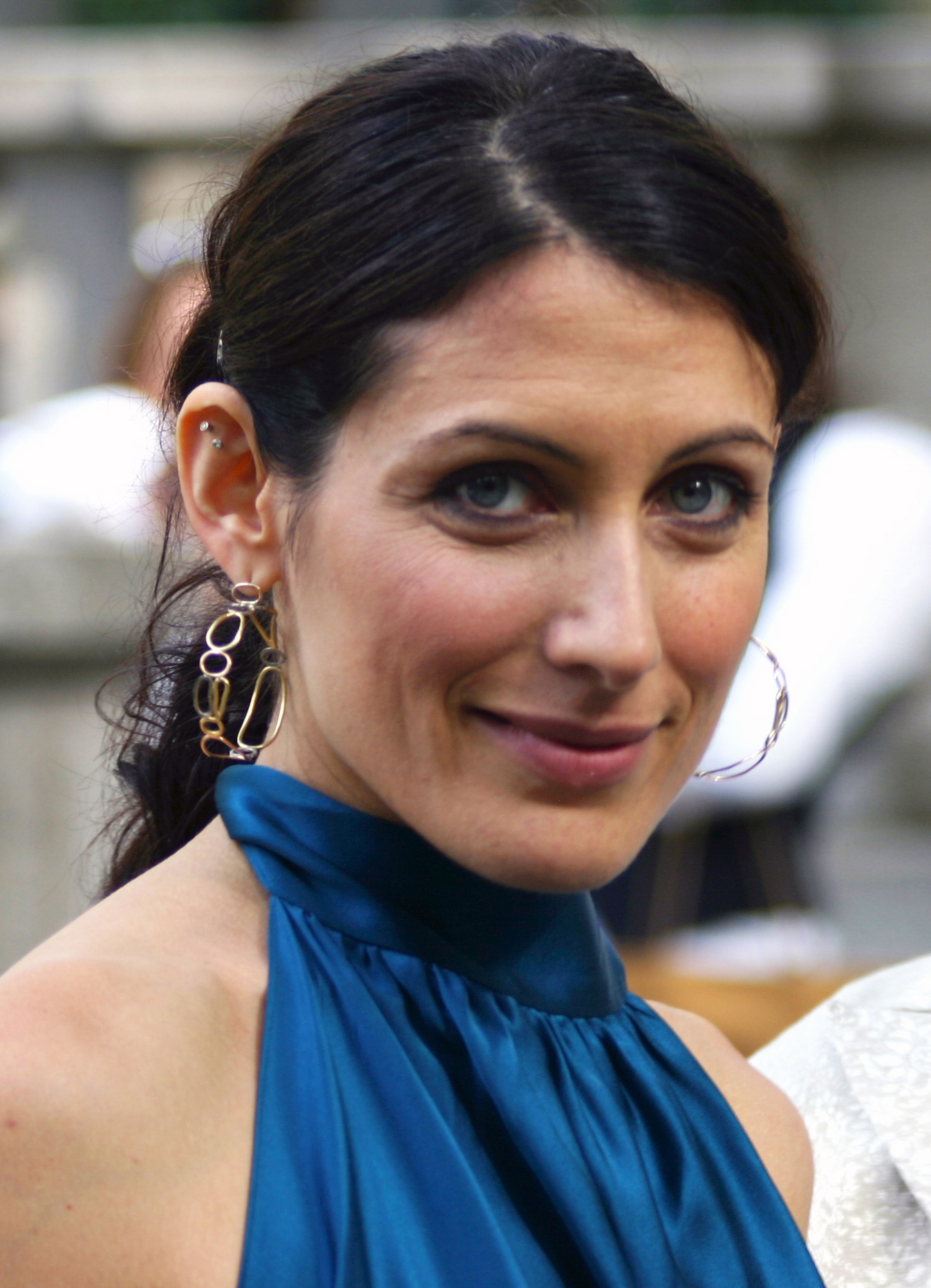
Lisa Edelstein received a Satellite Award in 2005.

The Satellite Awards are presented annually by the International Press Academy to the "best of the entertainment industry". House has won five awards, Including Best Drama series in 2005 and 2006.

Year	Category	Nominee	Result
2005	Outstanding TV Series – Drama	N/A	Won
2005	Outstanding DVD Release of a Television Show	Season One	Nominated
2005	Outstanding Lead Actor in a Television Series – Drama	Hugh Laurie	Won
2005	Outstanding Actress in a Supporting Role in a Series, Mini-Series or Motion Picture Made for Television	Lisa Edelstein	Won
2006	Outstanding Lead Actor in a Television Series – Drama	Hugh Laurie	Won
2006	Outstanding TV Series – Drama	N/A	Won
2007	Outstanding Lead Actor in a Television Series – Drama	Hugh Laurie	Nominated

== Screen Actors Guild Awards ==
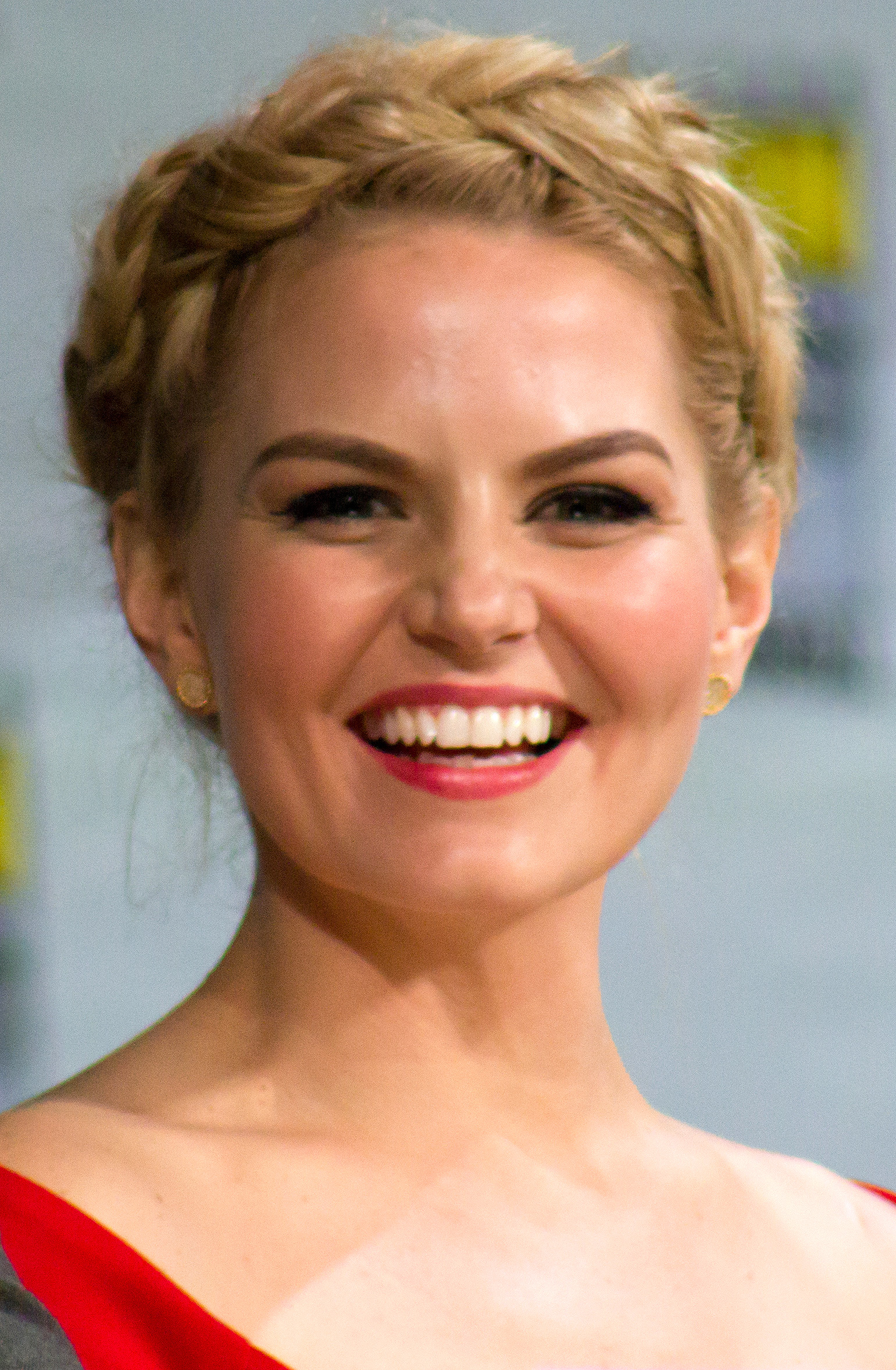
Jennifer Morrison was co-nominated for a Screen Actors Guild award in 2009.

The Screen Actors Guild (SAG) honors its members annually with awards for outstanding acting in film and television. House has been nominated for seven awards, six of which were for Hugh Laurie for Outstanding Performance by a Male Actor in a Drama Series, winning two of them.

Year	Category	Nominee(s)	Result
2006	Outstanding Performance by a Male Actor in a Drama Series	Hugh Laurie	Nominated
2007	Outstanding Performance by a Male Actor in a Drama Series	Hugh Laurie	Won
2008	Outstanding Performance by a Male Actor in a Drama Series	Hugh Laurie	Nominated
2009	Outstanding Performance by a Male Actor in a Drama Series	Hugh Laurie	Won
2009	Outstanding Performance by an Ensemble in a Drama Series	^{See below}	Nominated
2010	Outstanding Performance by a Male Actor in a Drama Series	Hugh Laurie	Nominated
2011	Outstanding Performance by a Male Actor in a Drama Series	Hugh Laurie	Nominated

^2009 "Outstanding Performance by an Ensemble in a Drama Series" Nominees: Lisa Edelstein, Omar Epps, Peter Jacobson, Hugh Laurie, Robert Sean Leonard, Jennifer Morrison, Kal Penn, Jesse Spencer & Olivia Wilde.

== Teen Choice Awards ==
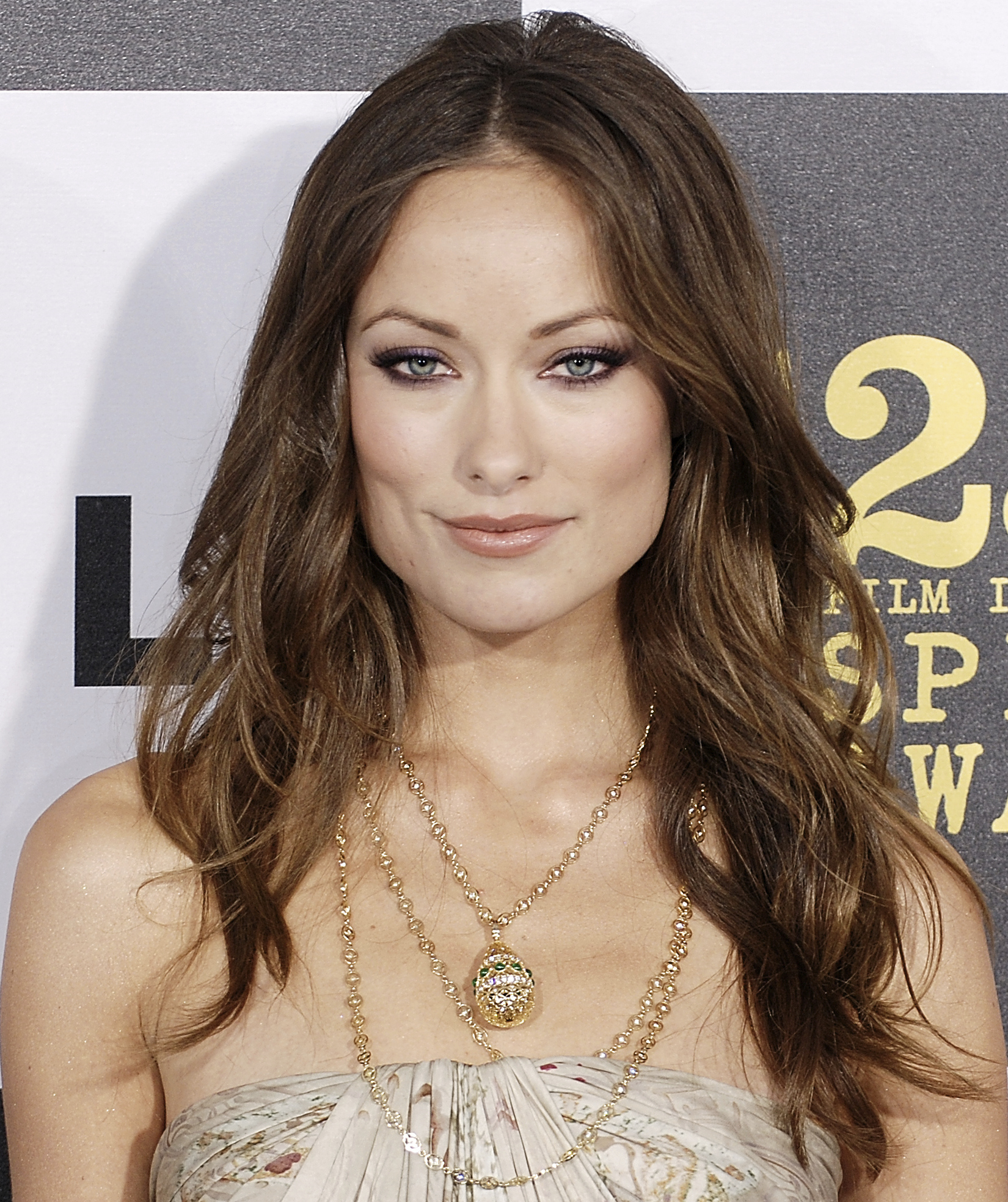
Olivia Wilde was nominated for a Teen Choice Award on four occasions.

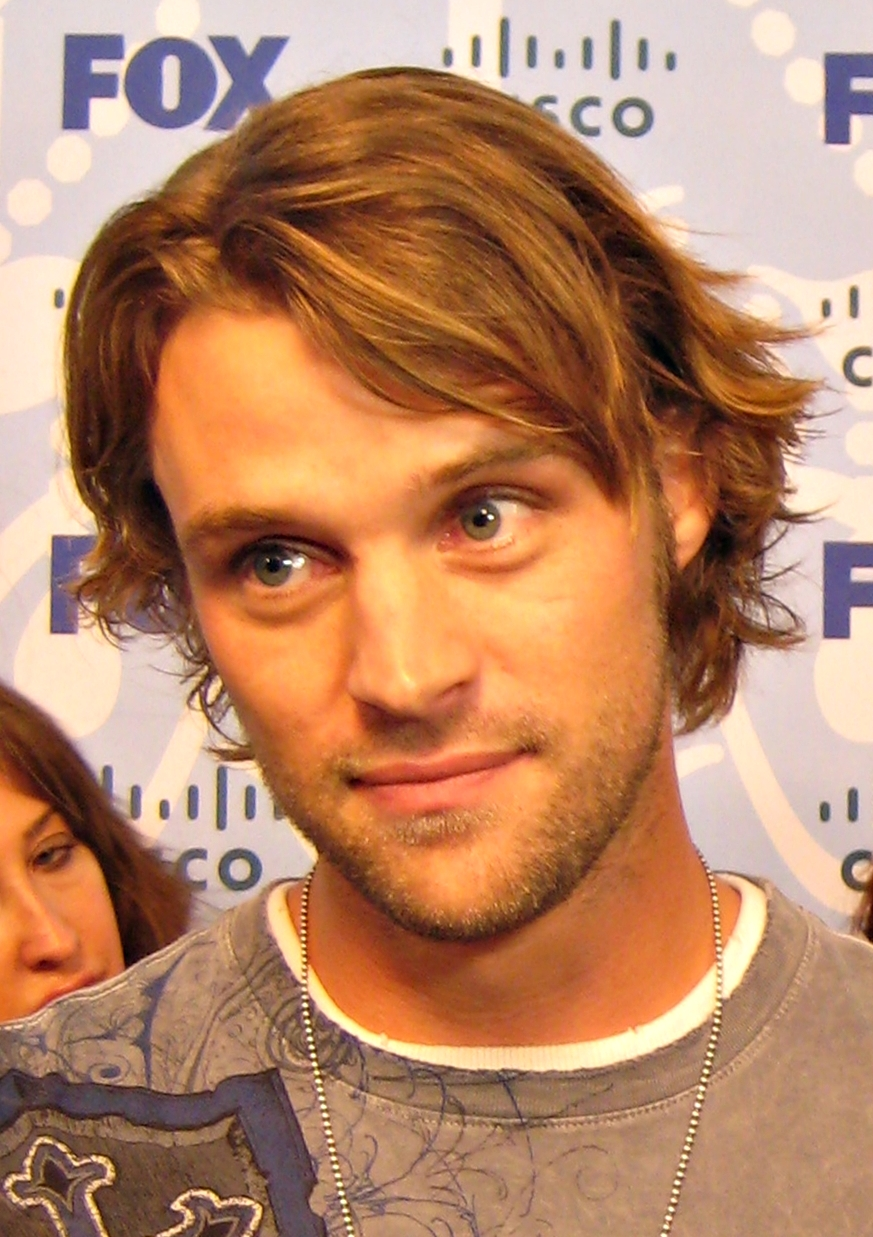
Jesse Spencer was nominated for a Teen Choice Award in 2005.

The Teen Choice Awards are voted on by teenagers online and honor the year's biggest achievements in television, film, music, sports and fashion. House has received 16 nominations, including four for Olivia Wilde, and three for Hugh Laurie. Laurie has won in 2007 for the Teen Choice Award for Choice TV Actor: Drama.

Year	Category	Nominee	Result
2005	Choice TV Show: Drama	N/A	Nominated
2005	Choice TV Breakout Show	N/A	Nominated
2005	Choice TV Breakout Performance – Male	Jesse Spencer	Nominated
2006	TV – Choice Drama/Action Adventure Show	N/A	Nominated
2006	TV – Choice Actor	Hugh Laurie	Nominated
2007	Choice TV Actor: Drama	Hugh Laurie	Won
2007	Choice TV Show: Drama	N/A	Nominated
2008	Choice TV Breakout Star Female	Olivia Wilde	Nominated
2008	Choice TV Show: Drama	N/A	Nominated
2009	Choice TV Actress: Drama	Olivia Wilde	Nominated
2009	Choice TV Show: Drama	N/A	Nominated
2010	Choice TV Actress: Drama	Olivia Wilde	Nominated
2010	Choice TV Show: Drama	N/A	Nominated
2011	Choice TV Actor: Drama	Hugh Laurie	Nominated
2011	Choice TV Actress: Drama	Olivia Wilde	Nominated
2011	Choice TV Show: Drama	N/A	Nominated

== TCA Awards ==
The TCA Awards are presented annually by the Television Critics Association for outstanding achievements in television. House has been nominated seven times, twice for Outstanding Achievement in Drama. Laurie has been nominated four times, winning twice in 2005 and 2006.

Year	Category	Nominee	Result
2005	Individual Achievement in Drama	Hugh Laurie	Won
2005	Outstanding New Program of the Year	N/A	Nominated
2005	Outstanding Achievement in Drama	N/A	Nominated
2006	Individual Achievement in Drama	Hugh Laurie	Won
2006	Outstanding Achievement in Drama	N/A	Nominated
2007	Individual Achievement in Drama	Hugh Laurie	Nominated
2009	Individual Achievement in Drama	Hugh Laurie	Nominated

== Writers Guild of America Awards ==
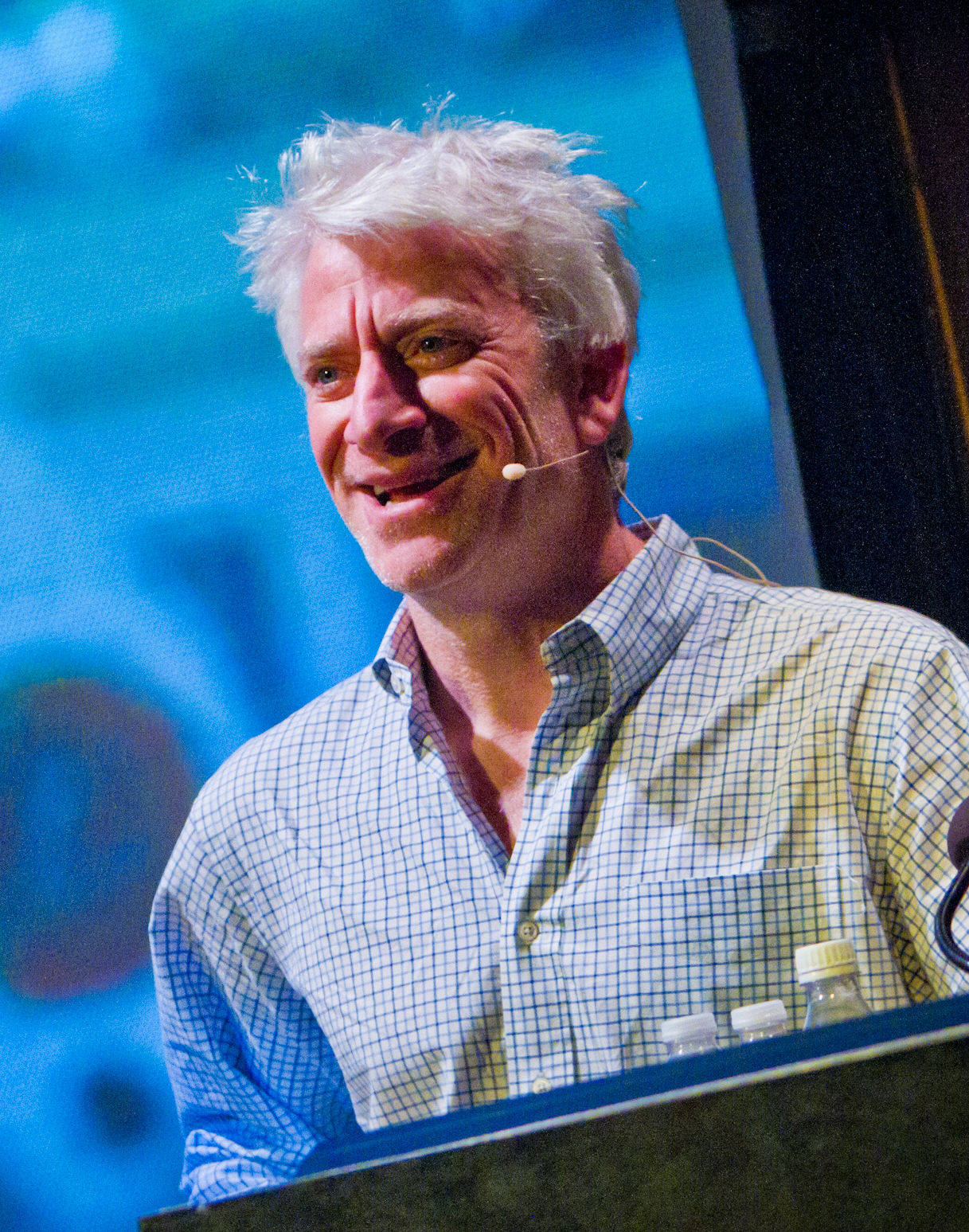
Lawrence Kaplow has won a Writers Guild of America Award in 2006.

The Writers Guild of America presents annual awards for outstanding achievements in film, television, and radio. House has been nominated for four awards in the Episodic Drama category, winning in 2006 and in 2010.

Year	Category	Nominee(s)	Episode	Result
2006	Episodic Drama	Lawrence Kaplow	"Autopsy"	Won
2009	Episodic Drama	Doris Egan & Leonard Dick	"Don't Ever Change"	Nominated
2010	Episodic Drama	Russel Friend, Garrett Lerner, David Foster & David Shore	"Broken part 1 & 2"	Won
2011	Episodic Drama	Russel Friend, Garrett Lerner & Peter Blake	"Help Me"	Nominated

== Young Artist Awards ==
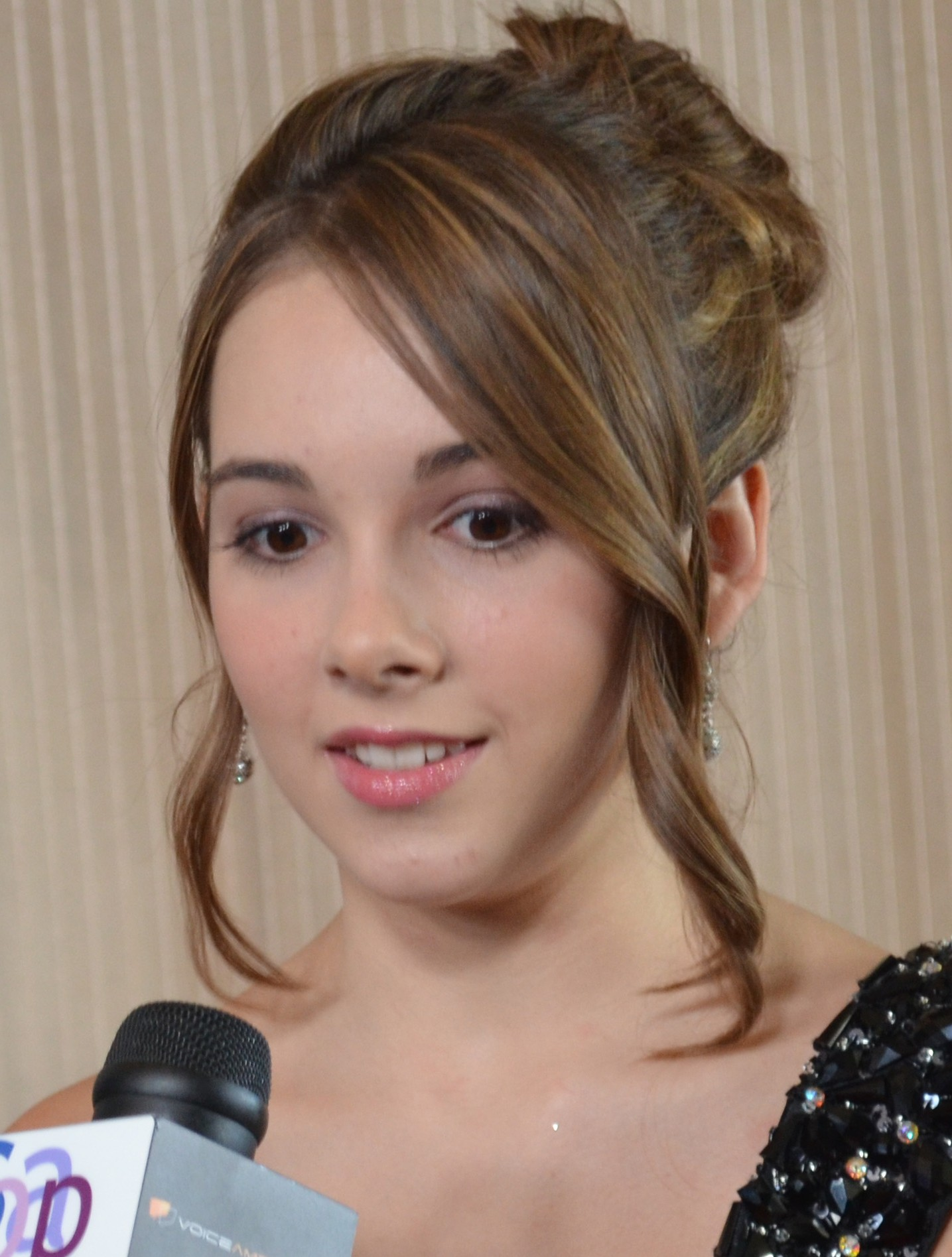
Haley Pullos has won a Young Artist Award Award in 2012.

The Young Artist Awards are presented annually by the Young Artist Foundation to recognize excellence of youth performers. Actors have been nominated nine times for their performances on House, winning two awards.

Year	Category	Nominee	Result
2006	Best Performance in a Television Series (Comedy or Drama) – Guest Starring Young Actress	Jennifer Stone for episode:"Heavy"	Nominated
2007	Best Performance in a TV Series (Comedy or Drama) – Guest Starring Young Actor	Skyler Gisondo	Nominated
2008	Best Performance in a TV Series – Guest Starring Young Actress	Bailee Madison for episode:"Act Your Age"	Nominated
2009	Best Performance in a TV Series – Guest Starring Young Actor	Nathan Gamble	Nominated
2010	Best Performance in a TV Series – Guest Starring Young Actor 13 and Under	Andy Scott Harris	Nominated
2011	Best Performance in a TV Series – Guest Starring Young Actress 11–15	Callie Thompson	Nominated
2012	Best Performance in a TV Series – Guest Starring Young Actor 11–13	Austin Michael Coleman	Won
2012	Best Performance in a TV Series – Guest Starring Young Actor 11–13	Haley Pullos	Won
2012	Best Performance in a TV Series – Guest Starring Young Actress Ten and Under	Shyloh Oostwald	Nominated

== Other U.S. awards ==
House has been nominated for awards at various Guild and society ceremonies. Show creator David Shore also received an award from the Lupus Foundation of America, for raising awareness for Lupus, a disease mentioned frequently on the show. The American Film Institute selected the show as one of the best television programs of 2005. The same year, House received a Peabody Award for achievement in electronic media, it also received two PGA Award nominations in 2006 and 2007.

"House has redefined the medical television show. No longer a world where an idealized doctor has all the answers or a hospital where gurneys race down the hallways, House's focus is on the pharmacological—and the intellectual demands of being a doctor. The trial-and-error of new medicine skillfully expands the show beyond the format of a classic procedural, and at the show's heart, a brilliant but flawed physician is doling out the prescriptions—a fitting symbol for modern medicine."

— American Film Institute judges

Year	Award	Category	Nominee(s)	Result
2005	AFI Awards	Television Program	N/A	Won
2005	Artios Awards	Best Dramatic Pilot Casting	Amy Lippens, Coreen Mayrs & Heike Brandstatter	Nominated
2006	Artios Awards	Best Dramatic Episodic Casting	Amy Lippens	Nominated
2008	Artios Awards	Outstanding Achievement in Casting – Television Series – Drama	Amy Lippens & Stephanie Laffin	Nominated
2006	ASC Awards	Outstanding Achievement in Cinematography in Episodic TV Series	Gale Tattersall for episode: "Meaning"	Nominated
2008	ASC Awards	Outstanding Achievement in Cinematography in Episodic TV Series	Gale Tattersall for episode: "House's Head"	Nominated
2008	Cinema Audio Society Awards	Outstanding Achievement in Sound Mixing for Television Series	Gerry Lentz & Rich Weingart for episode: "Last Resort"	Nominated
2009	Cinema Audio Society Awards	Outstanding Achievement in Sound Mixing for Television Movies and Mini-Series	Rich Weingart & Gerry Lentz for episode: "Broken"	Nominated
2009	California on Location Awards	Assistant Location Manager of the Year – Television (Teamsters Local 399)	Kim Crabb	Won
2005	DGA Awards	Outstanding Directorial Achievement in Dramatic Series' – Night	Paris Barclay for episode: "Three Stories"	Nominated
2007	Edgar Allan Poe Awards	Best Television Episode Teleplay	Thomas L. Moran for episode: "Clueless"	Nominated
2010	HPA Awards	Outstanding Sound – Television	Brad North, Joe DeAngelis, Luis Galdames & Jackie Oster	Nominated
2006	Lupus Research Institute Awards	Loop Award	David Shore	Won
2005	Peabody Awards	Achievement in electronic media	N/A	Won
2010	PEN Literary Awards	Teleplay	Peter Blake for episode: "The Tyrant"	Nominated
2006	PGA Awards	Television Producer of the Year Award in Dramatic Episodic	David Shore & Katie Jacobs	Nominated
2007	PGA Awards	Television Producer of the Year Award in Dramatic Episodic	David Shore, Katie Jacobs & Daniel Sackheim	Nominated
2005	Saturn Awards	Best Television Release on DVD	Season One	Nominated
2011	SOC Awards	Camera Operator of the Year Award	Anthony Gaudioz	Nominated

== International awards ==
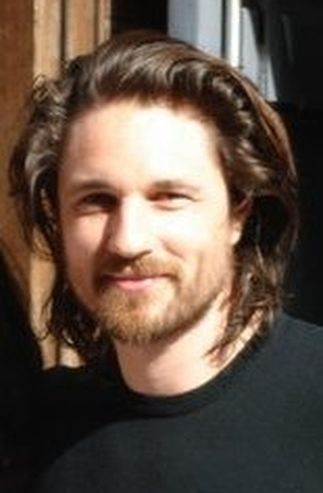
Martin Henderson was nominated for Australian Film Institute Awards in 2009.

House has been nominated for awards at various festivals and society ceremonies outside of United States for the best foreign or international TV series. These include a British Academy Television Awards nomination in 2007, and winning the "Golden Nymph" award at Monte-Carlo Television Festival in 2009. The show has also received nominations from the German Goldene Kamera, and the Spanish "TP de Oro" and "Premios Ondas," while Martin Henderson has received a nomination by the Australian Film Institute for the International Award for the best actor for his appearance in the episode "Painless".

Year	Organization, Country	Award	Category	Nominee	Result
2009	Australian Film Institute, Australia	AFI International Award	Best Actor	Martin Henderson	Nominated
2007	BAFTA, United Kingdom	British Academy Television Award	Best International	David Shore	Nominated
2009	Goldene Kamera, Germany	Audience Camera	Best US Series	Hugh Laurie	Won
2009	Monte-Carlo Television Festival, Monaco	Golden Nymph	Best International Drama TV Series	N/A	Won
2011	Premios Ondas, Spain	Television Award	Best Foreign Fiction Series	N/A	Won
2006	TP de Oro, Spain	TP de Oro Award	Best Foreign Series	N/A	Won
2007	TP de Oro, Spain	TP de Oro Award	Best Foreign Series	N/A	Won
2008	TP de Oro, Spain	TP de Oro Award	Best Foreign Series	N/A	Won
2009	TP de Oro, Spain	TP de Oro Award	Best Foreign Series	N/A	Nominated
2010	TP de Oro, Spain	TP de Oro Award	Best Foreign Series	N/A	Nominated
