= House season 6 =

House
- Season 6
- House Season 6 DVD cover
- Starring: Hugh Laurie; Robert Sean Leonard; Lisa Edelstein; Omar Epps; Jennifer Morrison; Jesse Spencer; Peter Jacobson; Olivia Wilde
- No. of episodes: 22

Release
- Original network: Fox
- Original release: September 21, 2009 – May 17, 2010

Season chronology
- ← Previous; Season 5 Next → Season 7

The sixth season of House premiered on September 21, 2009, with a two-hour premiere filmed at the Greystone Park Psychiatric Hospital in New Jersey. In the United Kingdom, the season began airing on Sky 1 and Sky 1 HD on October 4, 2009. Season six featured 22 episodes, two fewer than usual. It is the first season of House to feature Hugh Laurie as the only original cast member in all episodes, and the last season to feature Jennifer Morrison as a main cast member. It was fairly well received by critics, scoring 77 on Metacritic.

== Cast and characters ==
=== Main cast ===
- Hugh Laurie as Dr. Gregory House
- Robert Sean Leonard as Dr. James Wilson
- Lisa Edelstein as Dr. Lisa Cuddy (episodes 3–22)
- Omar Epps as Dr. Eric Foreman (episodes 3–22)
- Jennifer Morrison as Dr. Allison Cameron (episodes 3–8 and 17)
- Jesse Spencer as Dr. Robert Chase (episodes 3–22)
- Peter Jacobson as Dr. Chris Taub (episodes 3 and 8–22)
- Olivia Wilde as Dr. Remy 'Thirteen' Hadley (episodes 3–5 and 8–22)

=== Recurring cast ===
- Michael Weston as Lucas Douglas
- Jennifer Crystal Foley as Rachel Taub
- Andre Braugher as Dr. Darryl Nolan
- Cynthia Watros as Dr. Sam Carr
- Lin-Manuel Miranda as Juan "Alvie" Álvarez
- Patrick Price as Nurse Jeffrey Sparkman
- Tracy Vilar as Nurse Regina
- Christina Vidal as Nurse Sandy
- Vernee Watson-Johnson as Nurse Smits
- Maurice Godin as Dr. Lawrence Hourani
- Ron Perkins as Dr. Ron Simpson
- Nigel Gibbs as Sanford Wells

=== Guest cast ===
Ray Abruzzo, Sasha Alexander, Eva Amurri, Curtis Armstrong, Annabelle Attanasio, Alexandra Barreto, Neill Barry, Angela Bettis, Jolene Blalock, Dennis Boutsikaris, Roger Aaron Brown, Sarah Wayne Callies, Samuel Carman, Willie C. Carpenter, Larry Cedar, Nick Chinlund, Shelly Cole, Bianca Collins, Joseph Culp, Vicki Davis, Alex Désert, Megan Dodds, Denise Dowse, Shane Edelman, Ethan Embry, Mark Damon Espinoza, Kim Estes, Nick Eversman, Rob Evors, Celia Finkelstein, Cali Fredrichs, Andrea Gabriel, Holly Gagnier, Adam Garcia, Troy Garity, Beau Garrett, Marcus Giamatti, Carl Gilliard, Ben Giroux, Jeremy Howard, JD Jackson, James Earl Jones, Orlando Jones, Sarah Jones, Paul Keeley, Doug Kruse, John Lacy, Katherine LaNasa, Andrew Harrison Leeds, Ana Lenchantin, Riki Lindhome, Eric Lutes, Tanner Maguire, Joshua Malina, David Marciano, James McCauley, Da'Vone McDonald, Doug McKean, Zoe McLellan, Jamie McShane, Gonzalo Menendez, David Monahan, Jonathan Murphy, Garikayi Mutambirwa, Trever O'Brien, Marnette Patterson, Artemis Pebdani, Jack Plotnick, Franka Potente, Esteban Powell, Laura Prepon, Anthony Tyler Quinn, Wes Ramsey, Kim Rhodes, Derek Richardson, Adam Rothenberg, Freda Foh Shen, Jon Seda, Noah Segan, China Shavers, Patrick St. Esprit, David Strathairn, Lee Tergesen, Desean Terry, Dale E. Turner, Bernardo Verdugo, Rick D. Wasserman, Charlie Weber and Jessica Whitaker.

== Episodes ==
No. overall	No. in season	Title	Directed by	Written by	Original release date	US viewers (millions)
111	1	"Broken" (Note: Aired as a two hour premiere in the U.S., Canada and Australia, but as two separate episodes in other countries such as the United Kingdom)	Katie Jacobs	Russel Friend & Garrett Lerner & David Foster & David Shore	September 21, 2009	17.13
112	2	"Broken"	Katie Jacobs	Russel Friend & Garrett Lerner & David Foster & David Shore	September 21, 2009	17.13
House begins a detox program at Mayfield Psychiatric Hospital to get the Vicodin out of his system in an attempt to control his hallucinations. House being House, he tries to fool the doctors by not taking his medicine pretending he is getting better, but soon realizes that he has deep underlying issues. He starts his treatment and plans to leave the facility once he is clean, but he is strong-armed into staying by his attending physician, Dr. Darryl Nolan (Andre Braugher). Dr. Nolan agrees to write a recommendation to reinstate House's medical license only if House agrees to further treatment. When House is moved to a new ward in the hospital, he develops a close relationship with his new roommate, Alvie (Lin-Manuel Miranda), and Lydia (Franka Potente), a frequent visitor who helps House bend the rules. House asks Alvie to help him uncover incriminating information about Dr. Nolan that would allow him to blackmail his way out of the treatment center and convinces Lydia to loan him her car to sneak out a delusional patient in an attempt by House to undermine Dr. Nolan's course of treatment. But when devastating events ensue, House is humbled into reluctantly accepting help. After the delusional patient jumps off of a building, House decides that he needs to face himself and accept treatment from Dr. Nolan. He kisses Lydia at a party, Dr. Nolan helps him figure out what the kiss meant. After a catatonic patient, Lydia's sister-in-law, is cured, Lydia and her family decide to move to Arizona. House is eventually deemed healthy enough to leave Mayfield. As he does so, Alvie looks over his friend through a window. Inspired, he goes to a doctor, and requests meds, which he had not been taking, wanting to get better. Absent: Lisa Edelstein as Lisa Cuddy, Omar Epps as Eric Foreman, Jesse Spencer as Robert Chase, Jennifer Morrison as Allison Cameron, Peter Jacobson as Chris Taub, and Olivia Wilde as Remy Hadley
113	3	"Epic Fail"	Greg Yaitanes	Sara Hess & Liz Friedman	September 28, 2009	14.71
House returns and has surprising news for Cuddy; on the advice of his therapist, Dr. Darryl Nolan, he's quitting his job; an ailing video game creator (Rick D. Wasserman) opts for treatments suggested by people on the Internet rather than listening to the team, which is now being run by Foreman. Taub quits saying he only wanted this job to work with House. In the end, House wants to go back to his job in diagnosing, to help him ignore his leg pain. We learn that he is the one who solved Foreman's case. In the end Foreman fires Thirteen saying continuing to work together might drive them apart. Final diagnosis: Fabry disease
114	4	"The Tyrant"	David Straiton	Peter Blake	October 5, 2009	13.74
The team treats a controversial African dictator named Dibala (James Earl Jones) who has fallen ill while coming to America to give a speech at the United Nations. Meanwhile, Wilson tries to make amends with a feuding neighbor. Fearing a planned genocide, Chase purposely mixes up the blood tests with that of a body in the morgue, causing Dibala to be treated for the wrong illness. The dictator is killed, leaving Chase and Foreman guilty. Final diagnosis: Blastomycosis (Dibala) and Phantom limb (Murphy) Absent: Peter Jacobson as Chris Taub
115	5	"Instant Karma"	Greg Yaitanes	Thomas L. Moran	October 12, 2009	13.50
A wealthy businessman (Lee Tergesen) brings his son (Tanner Maguire), who is suffering from inexplicable stomach pains, to Princeton Plainsboro and insists on having Dr. House handle the case. The father of the patient believes the karmic penalty of his financial success is that he is victim to personal tragedy, and that the answer to his son's medical mystery lies in a reverse of fate rather than medical treatment. Meanwhile, Foreman and Chase prepare to present information on the Dibala case. Final diagnosis: Primary Antiphospholipid syndrome Absent: Peter Jacobson as Chris Taub
116	6	"Brave Heart"	Matt Shakman	Lawrence Kaplow	October 19, 2009	11.65
Cameron pushes the team to treat a man (Jon Seda) whose father, grandfather and great-grandfather have all died of a sudden heart attack before the age of 40, but House is reluctant to take the case without distinctive symptoms. Meanwhile, Chase is haunted by his actions in the Dibala case. Final diagnosis: Intracranial berry aneurysm of the brain stem Absent: Peter Jacobson as Chris Taub and Olivia Wilde as Remy Hadley
117	7	"Known Unknowns"	Greg Yaitanes	Matthew V. Lewis & Doris Egan	November 9, 2009	13.31
After a wild night out, a teenage girl (Annabelle Attanasio) is brought to Princeton Plainsboro with severely swollen appendages. The team must work to diagnose the young girl, who is less than honest about what happened the night she fell ill. As her condition worsens, she becomes unable to distinguish fact from fiction. Meanwhile, Cuddy, Wilson and House spend a weekend away from the hospital to attend a medical conference, but things don't go as planned when House's private investigator, Lucas Douglas (Michael Weston), returns. Final diagnosis: Vibrio vulnificus and haemochromatosis Absent: Peter Jacobson as Chris Taub and Olivia Wilde as Remy Hadley
118	8	"Teamwork"	David Straiton	Eli Attie	November 16, 2009	12.67
After House's medical license is reinstated, he reclaims his role as Head of Diagnostics in time to treat Hank Hardwick (Troy Garity), an adult film star admitted to Princeton-Plainsboro for pulsating eye pain. Eventually, the team find out that threadworm actually helped the patient by keeping Crohn's disease in control. So, the treatment is to drink a cup of water with threadworm. Meanwhile, Cuddy is reminded that Princeton-Plainsboro is not conducive to healthy personal relationships. At the end of the episode, Cameron leaves the team and Chase. Final diagnosis: Strongyloides and Crohn's disease
119	9	"Ignorance Is Bliss"	Greg Yaitanes	David Hoselton	November 23, 2009	11.95
On the eve of Thanksgiving, House and the team take on the case of James Sidas (Esteban Powell), an exceptionally brilliant physicist and author who traded his successful career for a job as a courier. For the ailing patient, intelligence is a miserable burden that has prompted depression and addiction, and this, coupled with myriad strange symptoms, nearly stumps the team. Meanwhile, the doctors at Princeton-Plainsboro wrestle with strained personal relationships. Final diagnosis: Thrombotic thrombocytopenic purpura complicated by dextromethorphan abuse and multiple accessory spleens Absent: Jennifer Morrison as Allison Cameron (Note: From this episode forward, Morrison is absent from the rest of the season, since her character is written off (although she returned in the episode Lockdown). Despite this, she is credited up to the episode Baggage.)
120	10	"Wilson"	Lesli Linka Glatter	David Foster	November 30, 2009	13.25
An old friend and former patient (Joshua Malina) of Wilson's experiences paralysis in his left arm during a hunting trip. Wilson takes this case himself. House thinks his friend has leukemia like before, however Wilson stays optimistic until the worst happens. Now he is forced to make radical decisions. Cuddy continues her search for real estate. Final diagnosis: Acute lymphoblastic leukemia Absent: Jennifer Morrison as Allison Cameron
121	11	"The Down Low"	Nick Gomez	Sara Hess & Liz Friedman	January 11, 2010	12.25
The team treat a man (Ethan Embry) who associates with drug dealers after he collapses during a sale, however the man refuses to reveal personal information to the team because it might incriminate him. Foreman's teammates conspire to convince him that his salary is less than theirs. Wilson buys a new condo, and House and Wilson are both flirting with Nora (Sasha Alexander), an attractive new neighbor in their building who thinks that House and Wilson are in a committed relationship. Final diagnosis: Hughes–Stovin syndrome Absent: Jennifer Morrison as Allison Cameron
122	12	"Remorse"	Andrew Bernstein	Peter Blake	January 25, 2010	14.21
The team takes on the case of Valerie (Beau Garrett), an attractive executive experiencing random episodes of excruciating pain. House agrees to take the case based on Valerie's looks, and while treating her, the men on the team are charmed by Valerie's beauty and personality, with Thirteen looking beyond the superficial to try to discover a link to her illness. Meanwhile, House uncharacteristically attempts to alleviate his conscience by reaching out to a former medical school colleague (Ray Abruzzo) he wronged. Final diagnosis: Psychopathy secondary to Wilson's disease Absent: Jennifer Morrison as Allison Cameron
123	13	"Moving the Chains"	David Straiton	Russel Friend & Garrett Lerner	February 1, 2010	13.38
House and the team rush to treat an ailing college American football star (Da'Vone McDonald) in time for the patient to compete in NFL tryouts. But when the patient experiences an onslaught of varied and unusual symptoms, the team has trouble reaching a consensus on how to effectively treat him in time. Meanwhile, Foreman's brother Marcus (Orlando Jones) makes a surprise visit to the hospital. Final diagnosis: Paraneoplastic syndrome secondary to melanoma Absent: Jennifer Morrison as Allison Cameron
124	14	"5 to 9"	Andrew Bernstein	Thomas L. Moran	February 8, 2010	13.60
During a day in the life of Princeton-Plainsboro's Dean of Medicine, Dr. Lisa Cuddy, the inner workings of the hospital are seen through her eyes. This day proves to be especially trying as Cuddy wrestles with myriad hospital issues and staff disputes that test her perseverance and skills as an administrator, all while juggling issues in her personal life. Absent: Jennifer Morrison as Allison Cameron
125	15	"Private Lives"	Sanford Bookstaver	Doris Egan	March 8, 2010	12.82
The team treats a famous blogger (Laura Prepon) for sudden coagulopathy, but finds her difficult to treat when she insists on discussing all procedures and doctors on her blog. Meanwhile, House and Wilson learn secrets about each other and go speed dating along with Chase. Final diagnosis: Whipple's disease Absent: Jennifer Morrison as Allison Cameron
126	16	"Black Hole"	Greg Yaitanes	Lawrence Kaplow	March 15, 2010	11.37
House and team tries to diagnose a high school senior (Cali Fredrichs) suffering from blackouts and hallucinations, and are forced to take a controversial approach. Meanwhile, Wilson attempts to furnish his new condo, and Taub brings his personal life into the workplace. Final diagnosis: Cerebellar schistosomiasis delayed hypersensitivity allergy Absent: Jennifer Morrison as Allison Cameron
127	17	"Lockdown"	Hugh Laurie	Story by : Eli Attie & Peter Blake; Teleplay by : Russel Friend & Garrett Lerner & Peter Blake & Eli Attie	April 12, 2010	10.80
When the hospital is sent into lockdown mode due to a missing infant, all of the doctors must remain where they are, leaving Foreman and Taub in the file room, Wilson and Thirteen in the cafeteria playing truth or dare, House in a room with a patient (David Strathairn), and Chase with his ex-wife, Cameron, as Cuddy tries to help police locate the infant.
128	18	"Knight Fall"	Juan J. Campanella	John C. Kelley	April 19, 2010	10.82
The diagnostics team takes on the case of a man roleplaying as a knight (Noah Segan) who collapses at the end of a duel during a Renaissance Fair, leading Foreman and Thirteen to head to the fair to investigate. Meanwhile, House learns that Wilson's newest girlfriend is his ex-wife, and tries all means to ruin the relationship in order to protect his friend from being hurt again. Final diagnosis: Anabolic steroid abuse accelerated by hemlock poison Absent: Jennifer Morrison as Allison Cameron
129	19	"Open and Shut"	Greg Yaitanes	Liz Friedman & Sara Hess	April 26, 2010	10.86
A woman in an open marriage (Sarah Wayne Callies) suddenly becomes ill during a date with her boyfriend; House tests Wilson and Sam's relationship. Taub's wife gives him permission to have relationships with other women. Final diagnosis: Henoch–Schönlein purpura Absent: Jennifer Morrison as Allison Cameron
130	20	"The Choice"	Juan J. Campanella	David Hoselton	May 3, 2010	9.98
The team takes on the case of an ailing groom-to-be (Adam Garcia) who harbors undisclosed secrets from a previous relationship. As his fiancée (Eva Amurri) tries to get answers to her many questions, a frustrated team winnows down the possibilities. Meanwhile, House spends extracurricular time with his Princeton Plainsboro colleagues, performing a karaoke rendition of a Gladys Knight & the Pips classic with Foreman and Chase. Final diagnosis: Arnold–Chiari malformation Absent: Jennifer Morrison as Allison Cameron
131	21	"Baggage"	David Straiton	Doris Egan & David Foster	May 10, 2010	9.48
House tells Dr. Nolan about the case of a woman (Zoe McLellan) suffering from both amnesia and another mystery condition. But Dr. Nolan believes that something else is troubling House — including the fact that Wilson is kicking him out of their home. Final diagnosis: Allergic reaction to tattoo ink. Absent: Jennifer Morrison as Allison Cameron
132	22	"Help Me"	Greg Yaitanes	Russel Friend & Garrett Lerner & Peter Blake	May 17, 2010	11.06
After a crane collapse buries a woman (China Shavers) beneath rubble, House must split his time between staying with her and diagnosing the crane operator (Doug Kruse), who passed out. But when she dies despite his best efforts, House must avoid the temptation to relapse on Vicodin—until Cuddy admits her love for him. Final diagnosis: Fat embolism due to amputation (Hannah); Arachnoid cyst on lower spine (Jay)

== Home media ==
=== DVD ===
Set details				Special features	
Country	North America	United Kingdom	Australia	Bonus Featurettes: Before "Broken"; A Different POV - Hugh Laurie Directs; New Faces in a New House; A New House for House; Episode Commentary; "Broken" by Katie Jacobs, Russel Friend and Garrett Lerner; "5-to-9" by Lisa Edelstein and Thomas L. Moran; "Wilson" by Robert Sean Leonard and David Foster, M.D.	
# episodes	22			Bonus Featurettes: Before "Broken"; A Different POV - Hugh Laurie Directs; New Faces in a New House; A New House for House; Episode Commentary; "Broken" by Katie Jacobs, Russel Friend and Garrett Lerner; "5-to-9" by Lisa Edelstein and Thomas L. Moran; "Wilson" by Robert Sean Leonard and David Foster, M.D.	
Aspect ratio	1.78:1			Bonus Featurettes: Before "Broken"; A Different POV - Hugh Laurie Directs; New Faces in a New House; A New House for House; Episode Commentary; "Broken" by Katie Jacobs, Russel Friend and Garrett Lerner; "5-to-9" by Lisa Edelstein and Thomas L. Moran; "Wilson" by Robert Sean Leonard and David Foster, M.D.	
Running time	969 minutes	929 minutes		Bonus Featurettes: Before "Broken"; A Different POV - Hugh Laurie Directs; New Faces in a New House; A New House for House; Episode Commentary; "Broken" by Katie Jacobs, Russel Friend and Garrett Lerner; "5-to-9" by Lisa Edelstein and Thomas L. Moran; "Wilson" by Robert Sean Leonard and David Foster, M.D.	
Audio	Dolby Digital 5.1			Bonus Featurettes: Before "Broken"; A Different POV - Hugh Laurie Directs; New Faces in a New House; A New House for House; Episode Commentary; "Broken" by Katie Jacobs, Russel Friend and Garrett Lerner; "5-to-9" by Lisa Edelstein and Thomas L. Moran; "Wilson" by Robert Sean Leonard and David Foster, M.D.	
Subtitles	English SDH, Spanish	English SDH	English	Bonus Featurettes: Before "Broken"; A Different POV - Hugh Laurie Directs; New Faces in a New House; A New House for House; Episode Commentary; "Broken" by Katie Jacobs, Russel Friend and Garrett Lerner; "5-to-9" by Lisa Edelstein and Thomas L. Moran; "Wilson" by Robert Sean Leonard and David Foster, M.D.	
# of discs	5	6	6	Bonus Featurettes: Before "Broken"; A Different POV - Hugh Laurie Directs; New Faces in a New House; A New House for House; Episode Commentary; "Broken" by Katie Jacobs, Russel Friend and Garrett Lerner; "5-to-9" by Lisa Edelstein and Thomas L. Moran; "Wilson" by Robert Sean Leonard and David Foster, M.D.	—N/a
Region	1 (NTSC)	2 (PAL)	4 (PAL)	Bonus Featurettes: Before "Broken"; A Different POV - Hugh Laurie Directs; New Faces in a New House; A New House for House; Episode Commentary; "Broken" by Katie Jacobs, Russel Friend and Garrett Lerner; "5-to-9" by Lisa Edelstein and Thomas L. Moran; "Wilson" by Robert Sean Leonard and David Foster, M.D.	
Rating	NOT RATED	15	M	Bonus Featurettes: Before "Broken"; A Different POV - Hugh Laurie Directs; New Faces in a New House; A New House for House; Episode Commentary; "Broken" by Katie Jacobs, Russel Friend and Garrett Lerner; "5-to-9" by Lisa Edelstein and Thomas L. Moran; "Wilson" by Robert Sean Leonard and David Foster, M.D.	
Release date	August 31, 2010	September 27, 2010	November 3, 2010	Bonus Featurettes: Before "Broken"; A Different POV - Hugh Laurie Directs; New Faces in a New House; A New House for House; Episode Commentary; "Broken" by Katie Jacobs, Russel Friend and Garrett Lerner; "5-to-9" by Lisa Edelstein and Thomas L. Moran; "Wilson" by Robert Sean Leonard and David Foster, M.D.	

=== Blu-ray ===
Set details				Special features
Country	North America	United Kingdom	Australia	Bonus features: Featurettes: Before "Broken"; A Different POV - Hugh Laurie Directs; A New House for House; New Faces in a New House; Crazy Cool Episode - Epic Fail; Episode Commentary; "Broken" by Katie Jacobs, Russel Friend and Garrett Lerner; "5-to-9" by Lisa Edelstein and Thomas L. Moran; "Wilson" by Robert Sean Leonard and David Foster, M.D.; U-Control - A Beginner's Guide to Diagnostic Medicine; BD-Live; My Scenes; Pocket Blu
# episodes	22			Bonus features: Featurettes: Before "Broken"; A Different POV - Hugh Laurie Directs; A New House for House; New Faces in a New House; Crazy Cool Episode - Epic Fail; Episode Commentary; "Broken" by Katie Jacobs, Russel Friend and Garrett Lerner; "5-to-9" by Lisa Edelstein and Thomas L. Moran; "Wilson" by Robert Sean Leonard and David Foster, M.D.; U-Control - A Beginner's Guide to Diagnostic Medicine; BD-Live; My Scenes; Pocket Blu
Aspect ratio	1.78:1			Bonus features: Featurettes: Before "Broken"; A Different POV - Hugh Laurie Directs; A New House for House; New Faces in a New House; Crazy Cool Episode - Epic Fail; Episode Commentary; "Broken" by Katie Jacobs, Russel Friend and Garrett Lerner; "5-to-9" by Lisa Edelstein and Thomas L. Moran; "Wilson" by Robert Sean Leonard and David Foster, M.D.; U-Control - A Beginner's Guide to Diagnostic Medicine; BD-Live; My Scenes; Pocket Blu
Running time	N/A			Bonus features: Featurettes: Before "Broken"; A Different POV - Hugh Laurie Directs; A New House for House; New Faces in a New House; Crazy Cool Episode - Epic Fail; Episode Commentary; "Broken" by Katie Jacobs, Russel Friend and Garrett Lerner; "5-to-9" by Lisa Edelstein and Thomas L. Moran; "Wilson" by Robert Sean Leonard and David Foster, M.D.; U-Control - A Beginner's Guide to Diagnostic Medicine; BD-Live; My Scenes; Pocket Blu
Audio	DTS-HD Master Audio 5.1 English audio			Bonus features: Featurettes: Before "Broken"; A Different POV - Hugh Laurie Directs; A New House for House; New Faces in a New House; Crazy Cool Episode - Epic Fail; Episode Commentary; "Broken" by Katie Jacobs, Russel Friend and Garrett Lerner; "5-to-9" by Lisa Edelstein and Thomas L. Moran; "Wilson" by Robert Sean Leonard and David Foster, M.D.; U-Control - A Beginner's Guide to Diagnostic Medicine; BD-Live; My Scenes; Pocket Blu
Subtitles	English SDH, Spanish subtitles			Bonus features: Featurettes: Before "Broken"; A Different POV - Hugh Laurie Directs; A New House for House; New Faces in a New House; Crazy Cool Episode - Epic Fail; Episode Commentary; "Broken" by Katie Jacobs, Russel Friend and Garrett Lerner; "5-to-9" by Lisa Edelstein and Thomas L. Moran; "Wilson" by Robert Sean Leonard and David Foster, M.D.; U-Control - A Beginner's Guide to Diagnostic Medicine; BD-Live; My Scenes; Pocket Blu
# of discs	5	5	—N/a	Bonus features: Featurettes: Before "Broken"; A Different POV - Hugh Laurie Directs; A New House for House; New Faces in a New House; Crazy Cool Episode - Epic Fail; Episode Commentary; "Broken" by Katie Jacobs, Russel Friend and Garrett Lerner; "5-to-9" by Lisa Edelstein and Thomas L. Moran; "Wilson" by Robert Sean Leonard and David Foster, M.D.; U-Control - A Beginner's Guide to Diagnostic Medicine; BD-Live; My Scenes; Pocket Blu
Rating	NOT RATED	15	—N/a	Bonus features: Featurettes: Before "Broken"; A Different POV - Hugh Laurie Directs; A New House for House; New Faces in a New House; Crazy Cool Episode - Epic Fail; Episode Commentary; "Broken" by Katie Jacobs, Russel Friend and Garrett Lerner; "5-to-9" by Lisa Edelstein and Thomas L. Moran; "Wilson" by Robert Sean Leonard and David Foster, M.D.; U-Control - A Beginner's Guide to Diagnostic Medicine; BD-Live; My Scenes; Pocket Blu
Region	A (NTSC)	B (PAL)		Bonus features: Featurettes: Before "Broken"; A Different POV - Hugh Laurie Directs; A New House for House; New Faces in a New House; Crazy Cool Episode - Epic Fail; Episode Commentary; "Broken" by Katie Jacobs, Russel Friend and Garrett Lerner; "5-to-9" by Lisa Edelstein and Thomas L. Moran; "Wilson" by Robert Sean Leonard and David Foster, M.D.; U-Control - A Beginner's Guide to Diagnostic Medicine; BD-Live; My Scenes; Pocket Blu
Release dates	August 31, 2010	September 27, 2010	August 18, 2010	Bonus features: Featurettes: Before "Broken"; A Different POV - Hugh Laurie Directs; A New House for House; New Faces in a New House; Crazy Cool Episode - Epic Fail; Episode Commentary; "Broken" by Katie Jacobs, Russel Friend and Garrett Lerner; "5-to-9" by Lisa Edelstein and Thomas L. Moran; "Wilson" by Robert Sean Leonard and David Foster, M.D.; U-Control - A Beginner's Guide to Diagnostic Medicine; BD-Live; My Scenes; Pocket Blu
