= Ignorance Is Bliss (House) =

- House episode
- Episode no.: Season 6 Episode 9
- Directed by: Greg Yaitanes
- Written by: David Hoselton
- Original air date: November 23, 2009

Guest appearances
- Michael Weston as Lucas Douglas; Esteban Powell as James Sidas; Vicki Davis as Dara Sidas; Jennifer Crystal Foley as Rachel Taub; Larry Cedar as Ed Beringer; Andrea Gabriel as Ronnie; Patrick Price as Nurse Jeffrey Sparkman

Episode chronology
← Previous "Teamwork"	Next → "Wilson"
- House season 6

"Ignorance Is Bliss" is the ninth episode of the sixth season of the American television series House. It aired on Fox on November 23, 2009.

== Plot ==
On the eve of Thanksgiving, House and the team take on the case of James Sidas (Esteban Powell), a brilliant physicist (IQ 178 – very gifted / very superior), the youngest person to ever graduate MIT, who traded his career to be with his wife (IQ 87 – low average / below average).

The team suspects he has TTP, but the splenectomy they perform does not improve his situation, ruling that condition out. It is revealed that depression as a teenager due to loneliness as a child prodigy led him to attempt suicide, and House realizes that the ribs he broke back then made his spleen split into several parts, which is why the procedure had no effect – it was TTP all along.

The remaining symptoms are explained after the discovery of his use of DXM (mixed with alcohol to prevent brain damage), which he used to reduce his intellect. As Sidas regains his intellect by not abusing the addictive medicine, he begins work in applied physics, drawing a schematic for a toroidal helicon plasma device.

He becomes dismayed that he cannot relate to his wife with his natural intellect. House, relating to his situation, helps "lobotomize Einstein" by giving him back his meds, as James wishes to be dumb and happy rather than smart and miserable.

House tries to break up Lucas and Cuddy at Thanksgiving dinner. However, Cuddy gives him the wrong address on purpose to stop him from messing up the evening. Afterwards, House breaks into Lucas' home, faking a drunken stupor, tells Lucas about how much he wants to be with Cuddy. Cuddy arrives the next morning at House's apartment, lying about how she and Lucas had split up. Later in the episode, House finds out she lied after she did not accept free tickets he offered her.

Meanwhile, Chase wants to be left alone to deal with the fact that Cameron left, but everybody keeps on wanting to comfort him. As a result, Chase ends up punching House in the face. He later apologizes and tells House it was his means of keeping the others away.

Taub has problems with his wife, because she thinks that, at the age of 40, he's still doing an intern's job instead of having his own private practice. Taub convinces her that he confronted House for keeping him from Thanksgiving dinner by showing her a picture of House's beaten-up face (by Chase), claiming he was responsible, which soothes her.

== Reception ==
Zack Handlen of The A.V. Club graded the episode a B.

== See also ==
- Nurse Jeffrey
