= Michael Weston =

American television and film actor (born 1973)

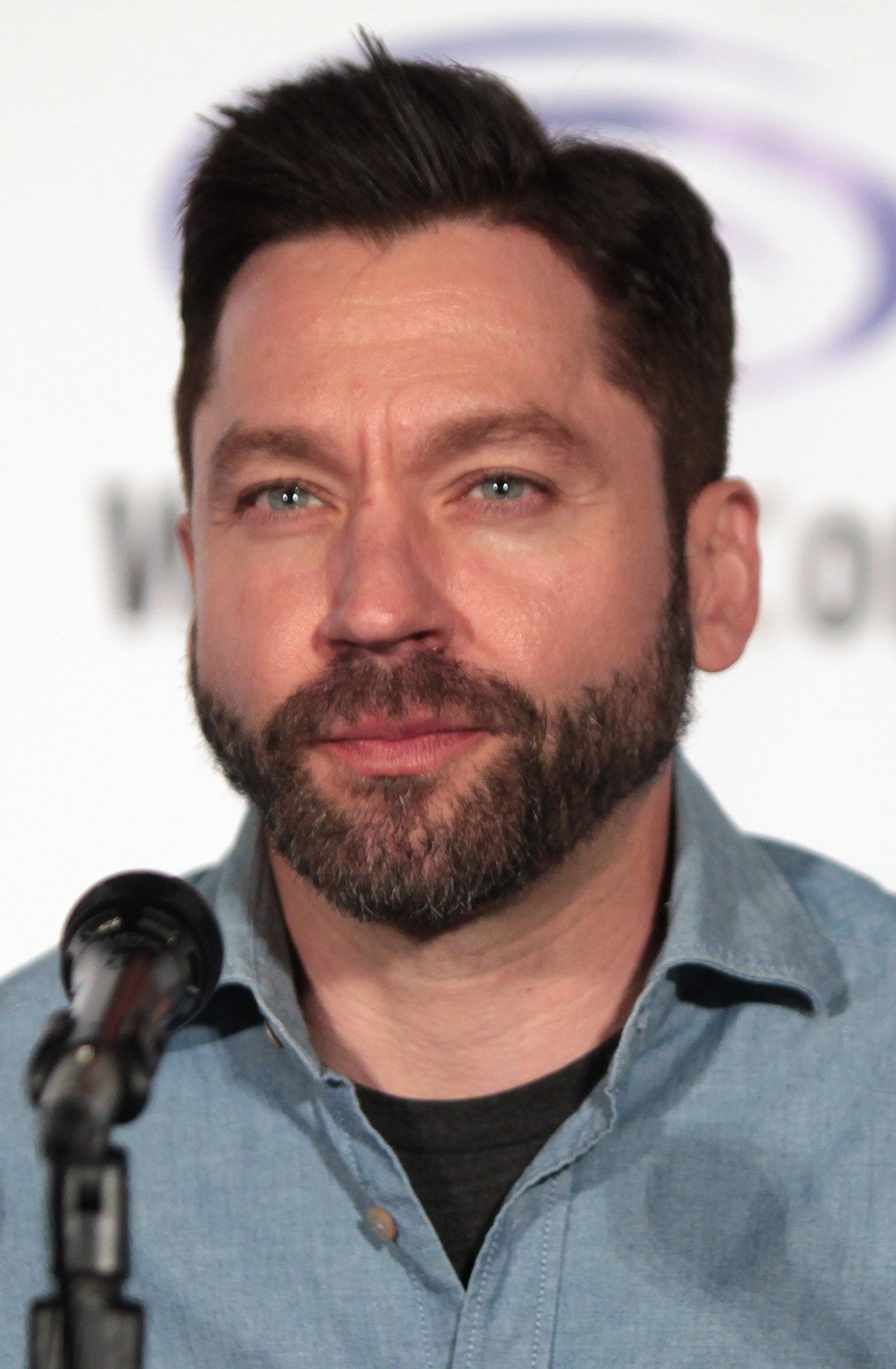
- Weston in 2016
- Born: Michael Rubinstein; October 25, 1973 (age 53); New York, New York, U.S.
- Occupation: Actor
- Years active: 1998–present
- Spouse: Priscilla Ahn (m. 2010)
- Children: 2
- Parent(s): John Rubinstein; Judi West

Michael Weston (born Michael Rubinstein, October 25, 1973) is an American television and film actor. His best-known roles are the private detective Lucas Douglas in House, the deranged and sadistic kidnapper Jake in Six Feet Under, and Private Brian Dancer in Scrubs, as well as Harry Houdini in Houdini & Doyle.

== Early life ==
Michael Rubinstein was born in New York City, the son of actors John Rubinstein and Judi West. His paternal grandfather was Polish-Jewish piano virtuoso Arthur Rubinstein. He is also the great-grandson of Polish conductor Emil Młynarski, the founding conductor of the Warsaw Philharmonic Orchestra and principal conductor of the Royal Scottish National Orchestra.

== Acting career ==
Weston holds a degree in Theater and Arts from Northwestern University, and in 2000 he changed his surname to "Weston" as there was already a "Michael Rubinstein" in the Screen Actors Guild. Weston is a good friend and former roommate of actor Zach Braff and has appeared in several features with him; including Getting to Know You (1999), Garden State, Wish I Was Here and The Last Kiss, and in a multi-episode arc as an injured soldier on Braff's television show Scrubs. Weston has also appeared as Simon Marsden, Olivia Benson's half-brother on Law & Order: Special Victims Unit.

Weston appeared in the fifth season of House as a private investigator named Lucas Douglas hired by Dr. Gregory House; he reappeared in season six. Series creator David Shore planned a spinoff show with Weston's character as the lead in 2008, but the show never went into production.

Weston appeared in the Gerard Butler action film Gamer in 2009. He made a guest appearance on White Collar and Burn Notice (in which the main character, Michael Westen, has a name very similar to his). In 2012, he starred in the A&E television movie Coma.

In 2016, he appeared as Harry Houdini in Houdini & Doyle.

== Personal life ==
Weston has been married to musician Priscilla Ahn since 2010.

== Filmography ==
=== Film ===
Year	Title	Role	Notes
1999	Getting to Know You	Jimmy	
2000	Coyote Ugly	Danny	
2000	Sally	Bugs	Credited as Michael Rubinstein
2000	Lucky Numbers	Larry	
2000	Cherry Falls	Ben	
2002	Wishcraft	Brett Bumpers	
2002	Hart's War	Pfc. W. Roy Potts	
2002	Evil Alien Conquerors	Kenny	
2004	Helter Skelter	Bobby Beausoleil	Television movie
2004	Garden State	Kenny	
2005	The Dukes of Hazzard	Deputy Enos Strate	
2006	The Last Kiss	Izzy	
2007	Wedding Daze	Ted	
2008	Pathology	Dr. Gallo	
2009	State of Play	Hank	
2009	Crank: High Voltage	Paramedic	
2009	Gamer	The producer	
2010	Love, Wedding, Marriage	Gerber	
2011	The Brooklyn Brothers Beat the Best	Jim	
2012	Liberal Arts	Miles	
2013	Expecting	Casey	
2014	Wish I Was Here	Jerry	
2015	See You in Valhalla	Don Burwood	
2015	Gravy	Anson	
2017	The Mad Whale	Tobias	
2018	Speed Kills	Shelly Katz	
2020	Adam	Ross	
2023	Bark	Nolan	

=== Television ===
Year	Title	Role	Notes
1998	Night Man	Rudy	Episode: "Chrome II"
2003	Frasier	Ice Sculptor	Episode: "Daphne Does Dinner"
2004	Monk	Morris	Episode: "Mr. Monk and the Employee of the Month"
2004–2005	Six Feet Under	Jake	Episodes: "That's My Dog" "Coming And Going" "Untitled" "All Alone"
2006	ER	Rafe Hendricks	Episodes: "Twenty-One Guns" "Bloodline"
2006	Saved	Tim Reston	Episode: "The Lady & the Tiger"
2007, 2014	Psych	Counselor Adam Hornstock	Episode: "Cloudy...Chance of Murder" "Remake A.K.A. Cloudy... With a Chance of Improvement"
2007	Scrubs	Private Brian Dancer	Episodes: "His Story IV" "My Perspective" "My Therapeutic Month" "My Fishbowl"
2007, 2012, 2019	Law & Order: Special Victims Unit	Simon Marsden	Episodes: "Philadelphia" "Florida" "Screwed" "Child’s Welfare" "Murdered at a Bad Address"
2008–2010	House	Lucas Douglas	Episodes: "Not Cancer" "Adverse Events" "Lucky Thirteen" "Known Unknowns" "Teamwork" "Ignorance Is Bliss" "Remorse" (cameo) "Moving the Chains" "5 to 9" "Knight Fall"
2009	CSI: Crime Scene Investigation	Ryan Morton; Tripp Linson; Carsten	Episode: "Kill Me If You Can"
2009	NCIS: Los Angeles	LAPD Detective John Quinn	Episode: "The Debt"
2009	Supernatural	(young) Charlie	Episode: "Criss Angel Is a Douchebag"
2009	Burn Notice	Spencer	Episode: "Signals and Codes"
2010	The Good Guys	Carson	Episode: "The Getaway"
2011	CSI: NY	Frank Waters	Episode: "Means to an End"
2012	White Collar	David Cook	Episode: "Diminishing Returns"
2012	Coma	Peter Arno	4 hour TV movie Based on the 1977 novel by Robin Cook
2013	The Office	Roger	Episode: "Moving On"
2014	Those Who Kill	Space Cowboy	Episodes: "Insomnia"; 1.9 "Untethered" "Surrender"
2015	Elementary	Oscar	Episodes: "For All You Know" "A Controlled Descent"
2016	Houdini & Doyle	Harry Houdini	Season 1
2017	Rosewood	Owen Panitch	Episode: "Bacterium & the Brothers Panitch"
2017	Hawaii Five-0	Oliver Mathus	Episode: "Mohala I Ka Wai Ka Maka O Ka Pua"
2018–2019	The Resident	Gordon Page	Season 2
2019	Into the Dark	Lonnie	Episode: "Treehouse"
2020–2021	Home Before Dark	Frank Briggs Jr.	Main Role
2026	Grey's Anatomy	Quinn Durston	Episode: "Take Me to the River"
