= The Down Low =

- House episode
- Episode no.: Season 6 Episode 11
- Directed by: Nick Gomez
- Written by: Sara Hess & Liz Friedman
- Original air date: January 11, 2010

Guest appearances
- Ethan Embry as Mickey; Sasha Alexander as Nora; Nick Chinlund as Eddie

Episode chronology
← Previous "Wilson"	Next → "Remorse"
- House season 6

"The Down Low" is the eleventh episode of the sixth season of House. It aired on Fox on January 11, 2010.

== Plot ==
When drug dealer Mickey (Ethan Embry) mysteriously collapses while negotiating a sale, his partner-in-crime, Eddie (Nick Chinlund), accompanies him to Princeton Plainsboro for treatment. But with a major deal pending, Mickey is not forthcoming with the necessary personal information the team needs to treat him. As Mickey's condition worsens, the team resorts to old-fashioned detective work to solve the case. Eddie takes Thirteen to a warehouse to inspect the drugs for clues; they are nearly caught, but Thirteen pretends to be a prostitute and they get away with it.

Thirteen, Chase, and Taub attempt to play a practical joke on Foreman. Thirteen leaves a phony paystub showing she earns more than Foreman on the floor where he finds it. When Foreman complains to Chase and Taub, they confirm that they earn as much as Thirteen. Thirteen also borrows an expensive watch to reinforce the joke. Foreman protests the apparent disparity in pay to Cuddy, but she refuses to negotiate, noting that Foreman does not have another offer to bargain with. Foreman later tells his coworkers that he is going to leave after this case and the three of them confess the joke to Cuddy and ask her to pay him extra out of their pay checks to keep him from resigning. She agrees, then tells them that Foreman has said nothing to her about leaving. As they leave Cuddy's office Foreman laughs at their gullibility.

Meanwhile, House and Wilson compete for the affection of a new neighbor, Nora (Sasha Alexander). House makes her think that they are a gay couple. When Wilson tries to explain that it's one of House's schemes, Nora misinterprets the situation and thinks that Wilson is jealous that she is spending time with House. Finally, at a restaurant, Wilson announces his "marriage proposal" to House. The plan works and she ends up resenting both of them.

House bugs Mickey's room to find out any useful secrets. When he is unable to, he realizes the signal is jammed because Mickey has a bug of his own in the room. Mickey is in fact an undercover cop terrified of being caught. He has been spying for 16 months. He is uncooperative because he fears blowing his cover and losing the case on a big cocaine dealer. House eventually realizes Mickey's disease is Hughes–Stovin syndrome, an untreatable autoimmune disease that creates multiple aneurysms. Thirteen comforts him saying he did the right thing not blowing the case because there was nothing they could have done, no matter what he said.

As Mickey dies in his wife's (Bonnie Kathleen Ryan) arms, Eddie and the drug dealers are arrested. As they're caught, Eddie realizes the truth about Mickey, and is visibly hurt. Earlier in the episode, Mickey had the choice of letting Eddie stay at his bedside and not get caught, or of sending him to the drug deal and get caught. Mickey chose to do his duty as a cop, but before Eddie left, Mickey apologized to him, knowing what was coming.

In the apartment, Wilson tells House that Nora regards them as "dirtbags". Wilson expresses a grudge for the sofa and begins singing "One", causing House to tell him he'll punch him in the face. Wilson tells him he'll stop if House brings it back.

"No chance", House says.

Wilson then continues singing much to House's dismay.

== Music ==
- "Maggot Brain" by Funkadelic
- "Sway" by Dean Martin
- "One" by the cast of A Chorus Line (Wilson sings this in the last few seconds of the episode).

== Reception ==
Zack Handlen of The A.V. Club graded "The Down Low" a B+.

IGN called some of the storylines very entertaining.
