= Remorse (House) =

- House episode
- Episode no.: Season 6 Episode 12
- Directed by: Andrew Bernstein
- Written by: Peter Blake
- Original air date: January 25, 2010

Guest appearances
- Michael Weston as Lucas Douglas; Beau Garrett as Valerie; Shane Edelman as Bill; Ray Abruzzo as Lorenzo Wibberly; Joseph Culp as Russ Smith; James McCauley as Norris

Episode chronology
← Previous "The Down Low"	Next → "Moving the Chains"
- House season 6

"Remorse" is the 12th episode of the sixth season of House. It aired on Fox on January 25, 2010.

== Plot ==
An attractive 27-year-old business consultant experiences intermittent episodes of excruciating ear pain. House is intrigued by the fact that Valerie (Beau Garrett) is very attractive while her husband is not.

While treating her ear pain, caused by supraventricular tachycardia, the men on the team are charmed by Valerie's beauty and personality. Only Thirteen looks beyond her superficial traits. During the half hour fMRI test, Valerie's brain bypasses the emotional centers and she uses the language sections of the brain to answer the questions, indicating that she knows what emotions are but does not feel them herself. Thus, Thirteen discovers that the patient is a psychopath. Valerie admits she drugged her co-worker to get him fired. She had been sleeping with him every Thursday; in exchange she got credit for his best work. She claims she is the same as other people except she openly admits it. More complications appear.

Throughout the differentials, Thirteen and Foreman continuously argue. House tells them to "have sex, fight, or quit," as he is tired of their bickering.

Following up on clues from a conversation with Thirteen, Valerie's husband finds out his wife was not attending weekly evening classes as claimed. Valerie counters with a sexual harassment complaint to the medical licensing board. Thirteen returns to verbally assault Valerie, but Foreman enters and removes her from the room and convinces her to ignore it. He also apologizes for firing her, and says he hopes they can work together again. Then he is paged because Valerie begins to spit up blood. Taub thinks it is primary hepatic fibrosis, so the team starts her on steroids.

Thirteen runs into Valerie's sister. Her sister recounts that the Valerie protected her from their abusive father and mentions Valerie started displaying antisocial behavior at puberty. Thirteen sees a connection to Wilson's disease. After removing Valerie's nail polish to reveal blue fingernail beds (confirming copper accumulation), Valerie is started on chelation therapy.

Valerie insults her husband, saying that he is pathetic for loving her even after learning what she is. The husband, distraught, leaves. Thirteen reasons that Valerie would not have done that if she was still a psychopath. The treatment has cured her psychopathy, and she begins to feel emotions again. When Thirteen asks her what she feels, she replies that she does not know, but it hurts, indicating she is experiencing guilt for having manipulated her husband (and pushing him away as a result) but is not familiar with the sensation. Thirteen replies that "it will".

House also uncharacteristically reaches out to a former medical school colleague named Wibberly (Ray Abruzzo) he wronged. House had exchanged a medical school assignment with one Wibberly wrote to test a hypothesis a professor was going to give him a bad grade regardless of the quality of his work. Wibberly originally claimed he got a failing grade, triggering a series of events and forcing him out of medical school. Reportedly now working in a low-paid job, he was selling his home to pay bills. When House tried to give him a check to help with expenses, Wibberly admitted he got an A+ for the paper, had a successful medical practice but lost his money to a gambling habit. House drops the check in Wibberly's mailbox at the end of the episode anyway. Wilson points out that House has chosen to apologize to Wibberly because he has not seen him for years, much easier than saying sorry to Wilson or Cuddy.

At the end, Thirteen helps Foreman decipher and transcribe Taub's handwritten notes. While Foreman types, Thirteen looks at him with a softer expression. House heads for Cuddy's office and stops in front of the door when he sees Lucas and Cuddy happily looking at something on their laptop. House turns around and leaves.

== Music ==
- "Why Try to Change Me Now", written by Cy Coleman, sung by Fiona Apple

== Reception ==
Zack Handlen of The A.V. Club graded the episode a B−, writing, "Valerie's mental illness just seems a little too controlled, a little too cool, somehow. Like Hopkins' Lecter, she's what we secretly wish crazy people were like—Machiavellian monsters who always make it to the final reel."
