= Help Me (House) =

- House episode
- Episode no.: Season 6 Episode 22
- Directed by: Greg Yaitanes
- Written by: Peter Blake; Russel Friend; Garrett Lerner
- Original air date: May 17, 2010

Guest appearances
- China Jesusita Shavers as Hanna; Doug Kruse as Jay Dolce; Jamie McShane as Captain McCreaney; Desean Terry as Charles

Episode chronology
← Previous "Baggage"	Next → "Now What?"
- House season 6

"Help Me" is the 22nd episode and season finale of the sixth season of the American medical drama House. It first aired on Fox on May 17, 2010. The episode covers a crane collapse in which House tries to save one of the victims, Hanna, who is trapped in rubble. "Help Me" was positively received by critics.

== Plot ==
After a crane collapse buries a woman beneath rubble, House must split his time between staying with her and diagnosing the crane operator who passed out. House discovers that Cuddy is engaged now, which leads him to a fight with her. The woman who House is trying to save dies of fat embolism after her leg is amputated, despite his best efforts. House must avoid the temptation to relapse on Vicodin—until Cuddy admits her love for him.

== Production ==
This episode was shot entirely using Canon EOS 5D Mark II cameras. These digital SLR cameras are primarily designed for still-picture photographs, but are one of the first to include high-definition video recording capability. These allowed the production team to work in very tight spaces, using minimal lighting, while also offering a very shallow depth of field putting the backgrounds out of focus, and making the work very challenging for the focus pullers. Original plans only included some scenes to be shot digitally, but eventually the Canon 5D cameras were used for the entire episode.

After successfully using the cameras for scenes on the episode "Lockdown", director of photography Gale Tattersall convinced producers to film an entire episode using the cameras. The episode was filmed using a wide variety of lenses, on loan from Canon. Motion stabilization rigs were also used to make the cameras more like motion picture cameras.

== Reception ==
=== Ratings and viewership ===
The episode was watched by 11.06 million American viewers, the 17th highest watched program of the week. Between the 18–49 age category, the show received 5.6 million viewers and was the 9th most watched program of the week for that category. The program, broadcast by Global Total, was watched by 2.55 million Canadians, making it the 4th highest watched program of the week in Canada.

=== Critical response ===
Jonah Krakow of IGN rated the episode 9.5 out of 10, calling it "fantastic". Jonah Krakow praised the episode's pacing and drew similarities to "5 to 9".

Zack Handlen of The A.V. Club gave the episode a B rating. Handlen wrote: "'Help Me' is strong, no question. I cared about the Patient Of The Week for the first time in a very long while ... Plus, as familiar as so much of this was ... it was done well, and Hugh Laurie was so strong, that it really made Hanna's fate matter."

Screenrant.com reviewed the episode very positively, calling it a "beautiful masterpiece in both acting and writing, but also a refreshing return to basics".
