= 5 to 9 =

- House episode
- Episode no.: Season 6 Episode 14
- Directed by: Andrew Bernstein
- Written by: Thomas L. Moran
- Original air date: February 8, 2010

Guest appearances
- Michael Weston as Lucas Douglas; Tracy Vilar as Nurse Regina; Maurice Godin as Dr. Lawrence Hourani; Patrick St. Esprit as Atlantic Net CEO Keith Tannenbaum; Celia Finkelstein as Gail; Mark Espinoza as Head Pharmacist Stan; JD Jackson as Lawyer Ronald Westbrook; John Lacy as Dr. Dave Thomas; Ron Perkins as Dr. Ron Simpson; Nigel Gibbs as Sanford Wells; Anthony Tyler Quinn as Eli Morgan; Jeremy Howard as Oscar Silva; Kim Estes as Hall; Bernardo Verdugo as Martín Acevedo

Episode chronology
← Previous "Moving the Chains"	Next → "Private Lives"
- House season 6

"5 to 9" is the fourteenth episode of the sixth season of House. It aired on Fox on February 8, 2010.

This episode provides a viewpoint into the hospital's operations from Dean of Medicine Lisa Cuddy, who faces off against a large medical insurer. Simultaneously, a pharmacy technician is caught stealing drugs, and House wants to use malaria to treat a cancer patient.

== Plot ==
Cuddy rises early in the morning to find Lucas is not in her bed. She quickly goes about her morning of tending to a sick Rachel as she tries to get ready. The nanny Marina arrives to deal with the baby, and Cuddy is about to leave for work when Lucas arrives after an all-night stakeout. Although she's late, stressed, and tired, she agrees to a morning quickie. Lucas "finishes" before she does and so now Cuddy is late, stressed, tired, and frustrated.

When Cuddy arrives at the hospital, she rushes to deal with a problem in the pharmacy. Then she goes to check into the O.R., where Dr. Hourani, mid-surgery, complains that House had bribed the plant to turn up the air conditioner to hurry him up so House's diagnostic team could use the O.R., and subsequently, he threatens to file a charge if it harms his patient's well-being.

Cuddy arrives late to her meeting with insurance executive Eli Morgan, and presents the hospital's final offer. Eli rejects it and Cuddy plays hardball by claiming to terminate their contract with his company. She gives him until 3 p.m. to accept her offer.

Cuddy goes into the hospital board meeting and gives them the news that she does not have a contract with the insurance company. The board members are unhappy, but she defends her decision. She is confident that Eli will give in, but it is made clear that she will be fired if her plan fails.

When a doctor does not show up for clinic duty, Cuddy fills in. She deals with a cancer patient whose oncologist will not give him a prescription for breast milk, which he is sure has cancer-fighting qualities, so that he can get his reimbursement. Cuddy refuses, and the patient walks out calling her a bitch. When finished with this unpleasant encounter, Cuddy is told by Nurse Regina that the vascular surgeon called in a replacement with no privileges.

A lawyer waiting in Cuddy's office alerts her that he is suing the hospital and Chase because of Chase's unauthorized reattachment of his client's thumb. Cuddy checks in with Chase, who says that, although his patient wanted the cheapest option, he performed the reattachment surgery anyway, noting that the thumb is a vital digit, and the patient, being a carpenter, would have been worse off without it.

Cuddy confronts Gail, the pharmacy technician who was stealing the ephedrine to lose weight. She apologizes for forging pharmaceutical orders and begs for a second chance. Cuddy does not report the crime to the DEA, but fires Gail.

At lunchtime, Cuddy asks Wilson for his advice on the insurance company, and Wilson suggests she consult House, who is, according to Wilson, the "master manipulator who always gets what he wants." She brings her salad back to her office but House is there. He wants to treat his cancer patient with malaria because he claims it is the cheapest way to deliver hypothermia.

Lucas visits Cuddy at the hospital and lets her know that Rachel does not have a fever. Cuddy goes to a restaurant where the CEO of the insurance company is having lunch. She appeals to him about PPH's proposal and she threatens to defame his greed in front of the press. The CEO does not budge.

The hospital's pharmacist lets Cuddy know that pharm tech Gail had stolen ten cases of ephedrine. Cuddy realizes that this was not about losing some weight. Eli comes to Cuddy's office on orders from the CEO, who has agreed to an eight percent increase. She demands the twelve she asked for, but Eli says they will never agree to such a preposterous number. He suggests she take the deal on the table.

Cuddy sits in a stairwell alone to think. When she emerges, House is waiting at the door. Cuddy finally asks House's advice about taking the insurance company's reply with eight percent. He questions why she would put her job on the line to prove a point.

Cuddy sees that it is now three o'clock, the deadline she gave to the insurance company. There is still no counter offer. She addresses the gathered hospital board members and doctors about terminating the contract. PPH will no longer accept patients from the insurance company. The room fills with buzz.

Foreman announces that they have a liver match for their patient. Yet House does not want to use Dr. Hourani for the surgery. House wants Chase to do it in order to prove to the doubting Dr. Thomas that Chase was his department's best surgeon. Cuddy interrupts House's massage and orders him to get his department under control.

Cuddy tries to rationalize with the lawyer and his client with the reattached thumb. She proposes that if they drop the lawsuit, the hospital will resubmit the claim and pay half his deductible. The man says he cannot pay. He thinks he would be in better shape without his thumb and its medical bills. Cuddy explains that her doctors do good work and deserve to be paid. The lawyer threatens to go to court. Cuddy refuses to back down and retaliates by threatening that the hospital would counter-sue and get paid, even if it means taking the man's house.

Cuddy gets paged to the pre-op area where Foreman and Thirteen are trying to break up a fistfight between Chase and Dr. Thomas. She makes them stop and summons them to her office, but she deals with the duplicitous pharm tech first. Gail is no longer the sobbing victim. Gail is prepared to lie to get out of her crime.

Exasperated, Cuddy is sitting in her car in the parking lot when House comes. Cuddy confesses that she thought the insurance company was the one who was bluffing. House knows she will not quit because the hospital matters to her. He also says he thinks Gail is a sociopath, and that he had said nothing about it to Cuddy because he thought she might come in handy one day, which gives Cuddy an idea.

Cuddy appeals to Gail to admit the truth. Gail calls her an idiot, and says that she began stealing six months after she was hired. Cuddy takes the flower that was sitting on her desk and hands it to Nurse Regina. She explains that Lucas gave her the hidden microphone inside of it, and instructs Regina to pass the recording of Gail's admission to the DEA. With one victory today, Cuddy goes to turn in her resignation to the board.

Marina finally calls to tell Cuddy that Rachel is better, causing her to miss the elevator. The insurance representative arrives, but this time he gives a shocked Cuddy her twelve percent increase from the insurance company with congratulations, which makes her shout with joy.

As Cuddy packs up for the night, she sees a check on her desk. The thumb replacement patient has delivered the first installment of his payment for the surgery. Cuddy rips up the check with a smile. The final cut shows Cuddy lying in bed with Rachel and Lucas, apparently reflecting a moment of peace in her busy day. Suddenly, Cuddy's pager starts to beep.

== Music ==
- The song that plays during Cuddy's morning routine in the teaser is "Break Up the Concrete" by The Pretenders.
- The song played at the end of the episode, overlaid with clips of a thrilled Cuddy (due to the insurance deal) is called "Shine On" by Eric Bibb.

== Reception ==
"5 to 9" was watched by 13.60 million American viewers. It was the third most-watched show on Fox in the week of broadcast, and the fifteenth across all channels. Viewership was up 840,000 on the season average of 12.76 million. Neal Justin, television critic of the Star Tribune, selected the episode amongst his recommended viewing for the week. Justin commented that "Edelstein's well-balanced performance may finally get her some Emmy love." TV Overmind's Brittany Frederick was pleased to have a House episode centered on Cuddy, observing that "too many early episodes merely had her show up for one line and then leave." Writing for The Star-Ledger, critic Alan Sepinwall noted that he had largely ceased reviewing House, but felt that the episode "was of an order of magnitude so much better than most of this season that [he] felt it deserved mention". Sepinwall praised Edelstein's acting and the episode's "day-in-the-life" format, citing "5 to 9" as proof that "there are still really strong elements to this series." Jonah Krakow of IGN rated "5 to 9" 9.2/10, signifying an "outstanding" episode. Kraków compared it positively to the earlier season six episode "Wilson", which similarly varied from the show's traditional format by depicting events from the perspective of House's friend James Wilson. He deemed the episode "amazing", calling it a "great showcase" for Edelstein and suggesting that a show centered on Cuddy could be a viable House spin-off. Kraków also observed the increased depth of characterization given to Cuddy, writing: "For years she's been portrayed as a cat's toy for House to bat around, but that's because we've never seen things through her eyes. As it turns out, she's a much more complicated character, and by the end of the episode, we learned beyond a shadow of a doubt why she's in charge."

In contrast to Kraków, Zack Handlen of The A.V. Club felt that "Wilson" was the more successful of the two episodes, observing that while "Wilson" increased understanding of the episode's central character, "In "5 to 9," we get more face time with Cuddy, and she's less of a cypher than usual, but her true nature remains tantalizingly out of reach." Handlen commented that the episode had some good scenes, but ultimately did little to advance the show, grading it "B". TV Squad's Jonathan Toomey raised similar issues, noting that "'5 to 9' wasn't a bad episode (in many ways, it felt like a back-door pilot for Cuddy), but it was, in a word, pointless." Toomey wrote that "At the end of the day, '5 to 9' doesn't really add anything to the world of House, and its outside-the-box attempt at being different just ended up being forgettable."
