= Lucky Thirteen (House) =

- House episode
- Episode no.: Season 5 Episode 5
- Directed by: Greg Yaitanes
- Written by: Liz Friedman & Sara Hess
- Original air date: October 21, 2008

Guest appearances
- Michael Weston as Lucas Douglas; Angela Gots as Spencer

Episode chronology
← Previous "Birthmarks"	Next → "Joy"
- House season 5

"Lucky Thirteen" is the fifth episode of the fifth season of House and the ninety-first episode overall. It aired on Fox on October 21, 2008.

== Plot ==
Spencer, a woman with whom Thirteen is having a one-night stand, has a seizure at Thirteen's apartment. Thirteen accompanies her to Princeton-Plainsboro Teaching Hospital where House and the team take the case. House remains more focused on Thirteen's bisexuality and finds the situation an opportunity to delve into her personal life. House and Foreman go to Thirteen's apartment to search for drugs that might have caused Spencer's illness.

Thirteen suspects that the woman's illness is related to her drug use, but she then finds out that the woman has a long medical history and has seen several doctors over the past few years, along with discovering that she only slept with Thirteen to get to House, who had previously rejected her as a patient. Foreman confronts Thirteen about her current hard-partying lifestyle, warning her that it is sending her life and job into a downward spiral.

After Cuddy catches Thirteen with a terrible hangover, she wants Thirteen to submit to a drug test. After preventing Thirteen from having to be tested, House fires her for missing the differential diagnosis. Despite being technically unemployed and off the case, Thirteen remains at the hospital. When it is determined Spencer's illness, Lymphangioleiomyomatosis, is fatal, Thirteen volunteers to tell her. Later, House asks Thirteen if Spencer cried when she heard the bad news. Thirteen says no. House then determines the true cause of the girl's illness based upon her inability to produce tears, a symptom of her illness, candidiasis secondary to Sjögren's syndrome.

When Thirteen is able to prove her loyalties at the end of the episode, House rehires her, although Thirteen discovers that her firing was merely a game of House's to see if she would grow close with the patient. At the end of the episode, Thirteen continues with her risky habits, partying with another woman.

It is also revealed that Cuddy is adopting a baby, after House follows Wilson to a baby store and sees her there. When House learns that Cuddy had Wilson be her character reference for the adoption agency, House repeats the phrase "If you're happy, I'm..." for the second time in this episode before walking away.

== Music ==
Songs featured in this episode include "Cheap and Cheerful" by The Kills, "Could We Survive" by Joseph Arthur, and "Dark Road" by Annie Lennox.

== Reception ==
Zack Handlen, reviewing for The A.V. Club, noted some apprehension about how Thirteen's bisexuality would be handled, but concluded it was handled appropriately. James Chamberlin, writing for IGN, found the medical scenario implausible: "The medical consultants failed miserably this week, likely being overridden by the writers."
