= Broken (House) =

- House episodes
- Episode nos.: Season 6 Episodes 1 and 2
- Directed by: Katie Jacobs
- Written by: Garrett Lerner; Russel Friend; David Shore; David Foster
- Original air date: September 21, 2009

Guest appearances
- Franka Potente as Lydia Bohm; Lin-Manuel Miranda as Juan "Alvie" Álvarez; Megan Dodds as Dr. Beasley; Derek Richardson as Steve Alkateen / Freedom Master; Curtis Armstrong as Richter; Andrew Harrison Leeds as Dr. Medina; Angela Bettis as Susan; Jack Plotnick as Hal / Connor; Artemis Pebdani as Diane; Alex Désert as Jay-Bird; Kim Rhodes as the flirting woman at the fundraiser; Dale E. Turner as Duane "Stomp" Milbrett; Ana Lenchantin as Annie "Silent Girl" Bohm; Andre Braugher as Dr. Darryl Nolan

Episode chronology
← Previous "Both Sides Now"	Next → "Epic Fail"
- House season 6

"Broken" is the title for the first and second episode of the sixth season of the television series House. The two-part season premiere was first broadcast on Fox on September 21, 2009. The narrative follows series protagonist Dr. Gregory House (Hugh Laurie) as he overcomes his Vicodin addiction and psychological problems at Mayfield Psychiatric Hospital.

Receiving season-high ratings, the episode garnered positive reviews from critics. The performance of Hugh Laurie was also applauded.

== Plot ==
House awakens in the Mayfield Psychiatric Hospital after suffering through the painful effects of Vicodin withdrawal. He asks to leave knowing that they legally cannot keep him because he voluntarily committed himself. However, Dr. Nolan (Andre Braugher) refuses to sign a recommendation that he is able to return to practicing medicine. House resigns himself to staying at the hospital and getting his clearance. He meets his bipolar roommate, Alvie (Lin-Manuel Miranda), and begrudgingly participates in group therapy with Dr. Beasley. He also meets and is intrigued by Lydia (Franka Potente), a woman who plays piano for her sister-in-law Annie (Ana Lenchantin), an unresponsive patient in the ward who was a cellist.

House attempts to be kicked out by making the patients' and workers' lives miserable, starting by humiliating the patients by deducing their problems during a group therapy session but only succeeds in being placed in solitary confinement. House then goads his fellow patients into creating havoc in the ward over not being allowed table tennis paddles, but Dr. Nolan calms them by giving them the paddles. From the hospital window, House sees Dr. Nolan get into a car with a woman. House convinces Alvie to break into Nolan's office to get information on him, but Alvie finds nothing useful. House then phones Wilson to ask for help blackmailing Nolan, but Wilson refuses, saying that Nolan had warned him that House may try to do something like this and that he should let Nolan do his job. House starts to adjust to life inside the institution. His only respite is Lydia's regular visits, during which they talk and discuss music.

A new patient named Steve (Derek Richardson), who insists on the name "Freedom Master", believes he is a superhero that can fly. During one of his episodes, the doctors drug him into a catatonic state. House is infuriated by this, and, with Lydia's help, kidnaps Steve and takes him to a carnival. House and Steve go on a wind tunnel ride which makes it appear as if they are really flying. Steve is overjoyed, but then actually believes he can fly and jumps off a parking structure. With Steve badly injured, Dr. Nolan tells House he cannot possibly treat someone so uncooperative. As Nolan leaves, however, House softly calls him back and says, "I need help." He begins therapy with Nolan and House says, "I want to get better." House takes his medication for the first time, and tells Alvie that his new plan is to cooperate, much to the chagrin of Alvie, who feels betrayed.

Nolan brings House a suit and has him mingle at the hospital's fund-raising party. His assignment is to make connections with strangers. It is difficult for House at first, but then he has fun toying with people. Lydia becomes his accomplice and before she leaves, she kisses House.

House discusses the kiss with Nolan. Lydia is married. He also feels guilty about what happened to Steve, and Nolan tells him to apologize personally. During group therapy, Dr. Beasley suggests the patients put on a talent show. House has an idea of how to help Steve, who had been trying to "save" the silent girl, Annie, with a music box confiscated in the nurse's station. Steve calls it her "voicebox". House convinces Beasley to allow them to get the music box, but Dr. Nolan comes in to break up the group and wheels Steve away, saying that House was "trying to fix, instead of moving on."

House rebuffs Lydia because he knows that, in the end, someone will get hurt. House is given a day pass by Dr. Nolan who requests his presence. He arrives at a hospital to find Nolan at the bedside of his dying father; a tearful Nolan asks House for a consultation. House has nothing to add to the diagnosis, confirming that Nolan Sr.'s condition is terminal. House accuses Nolan of having no one else to turn to but his own patient (House himself). Nolan tells House that he does not need him to make deductions, and House realizes that what he needs is company, so he stays and sits in silence.

When House returns to Mayfield, he finds Lydia upset over her sister-in-law. He apologizes and dances with her. They find an empty room and have sex.

The residents hold a talent show. House does not participate at first, but is coaxed into helping Alvie when he cannot finish his rap on stage.

House apologizes to Steve, and as he wheels him away, Steve breaks his silence and gives the silent Annie the music box he was holding. For the first time, she speaks to say "thank you." Lydia arrives and House takes her in to see the group watching her sister-in-law playing "Bach's Cello Suite No. 1" on the cello.

After learning that Annie is being released from Mayfield, House goes to Nolan's office to confront him. Dr. Nolan tells House that Lydia and her husband are taking Annie to a rehab facility in Arizona. House demands an overnight pass, and over Nolan's objections he goes to see Lydia at her home. He is startled when Lydia's young son answers the door. House wants her to stay, and Lydia says she wants to but ends up asking House to leave. Back in the Mayfield parking lot, House talks to Dr. Nolan about his feelings, which, in conjunction with House getting close enough to someone to be hurt in the first place, convinces him that House deserves the recommendation to the medical board, showing that he learned to talk about his problems instead of abusing Vicodin and deserves his medical license back.

Mayfield gives House a good-bye party with House even shoving his face into the cake, surprising everyone in the room, and House is discharged and gets on a bus back to Princeton, sitting at the back of the bus where it's revealed he's also wearing a t-shirt Alvie had earlier, one that has a big smiley face on it. After the departure of House, Alvie decides he wants to get better and goes back on his medication.

== Production ==
Greystone Park Psychiatric Hospital was used for exterior shots of the hospital. Actors Franka Potente and Derek Richardson, who had one series of scenes together in this episode, started dating afterward and married in 2012.

== Reception ==
The episode was well received by critics. Metacritic reported generally favorable reviews with a score of 77/100 based on 8 reviews. The show earned a 9.5 rating out of 983 votes on TV.com. Entertainment Weekly stated "a trite, untrue mental-illness mystery insults the show's high IQ, but doesn't diminish the opener's capture-the-imagination thesis: that a redeemed House can be just as compelling as a rude House." Mary McNamara of the Los Angeles Times said "the episode has a few sentimentality issues (any plot point involving a music box walks a very fine line), but it doesn't matter much because the characters are so vivid they even outshine House at times, which can only be good for him." Alan Sepinwall from The Newark Star-Ledger praised the episode saying "for one night, this is the best House, and its leading man, have been in a long time." The episode also won for Best Episodic Drama at Writers Guild of America Awards 2009.

=== Rating ===
In its original broadcast, "Part One" was viewed by an estimated 16.5 million viewers, with "Part Two" bringing in approximately 17.25 million viewers. Compared to the rest of the sixth season, the episodes became the highest-rated in front of "Epic Fail", which received only 14.44 million viewers.

The two-hour season premiere garnered the top Nielsen Ratings on the first night of the broadcast networks' premiere week. The show averaged a 6.7/16 with 17.1 million viewers. The rating was a significant rise from the previous year's season premiere, which averaged a 5.6/16 and 14.4 million viewers.

4.43 million Canadians watched this episode, making it the most viewed program of the week.
