= Wilson (House episode) =

- House episode
- Episode no.: Season 6 Episode 10
- Directed by: Lesli Linka Glatter
- Written by: David Foster
- Original air date: November 30, 2009

Guest appearances
- Joshua Malina as Tucker; Katherine LaNasa as Melissa; Marnette Patterson as Ashley; Christina Vidal as Nurse Sandy; Willie C. Carpenter as Del Wilson; Jessica Whitaker as Emily

Episode chronology
← Previous "Ignorance Is Bliss"	Next → "The Down Low"
- House season 6

"Wilson" is the tenth episode of the sixth season of House. It aired on Fox on November 30, 2009. In contrast to the usual storylines focused on Gregory House, this episode is centered on James Wilson and a day in his life.

== Plot ==
Gregory House wakes James Wilson from sleep at 6:30 a.m. by playing his guitar and singing "Faith" by George Michael. House asks why Wilson is not getting ready for work, and Wilson explains that he is taking a day off and going hunting with a friend. Wilson returns to bed but House reminds him that Wilson’s hunting partner is not a friend but a "self-important jerk" who consistently misnames Wilson (who always goes by “James”) as “Jim”.

Wilson’s hunting companion is a former leukemia patient, Tucker, who credits Wilson with saving his life five years earlier. He wants to reward "Jim" in various ways (such as taking Wilson hunting) for saving his life. They follow a ritual of sticking an empty chemotherapy bag onto a tree, Wilson labeling it with the number of years Tucker has been free of cancer, and Tucker shooting the bag. Wilson turns away, using a hunting whistle to try to attract turkeys, when Tucker suddenly misfires, narrowly missing Wilson's head. Wilson turns around alarmed, finding Tucker on the ground, complaining he cannot move his arm.

Tucker is summarily taken to the hospital for diagnostic tests. Initially, Wilson diagnoses the man with transverse myelitis after noticing that Tucker's girlfriend has a cold sore, the virus of which, if transmitted to Tucker, could be the cause of his sudden-onset paralysis. Wilson prescribes acyclovir, feeling proud of his "House-like" diagnostic coup. House, however, bets Wilson $100 that Tucker’s cancer has recurred, which Wilson refuses to believe. Tucker is discovered to have acute lymphoblastic leukemia, a different form of leukemia than he was previously treated for (the chemotherapy treatment of which possibly caused/complicated this new recurrence). The cancer seems treatable, but Tucker does not initially respond to treatment. During the treatment process, irrespective of House's warning, Wilson decides to employ a double dose of chemotherapy, which cures the cancer but leads to severe liver damage. Wilson is horrified to realize that without a transplant, Tucker has about twenty-four hours to live.

House informs Wilson of a recently admitted motorcycle accident victim who might be a potential donor, but his sister, an Asian woman who appears to be a member of Mahikari, is unwilling to allow the organ donation because she does not want to violate his remains before burial. After visiting the sister at home and unsuccessfully trying to convince her, Wilson learns that it is too late anyway as the accident victim’s liver has already degraded beyond usefulness.

Remembering Wilson had donated blood to him before, Tucker realizes his friend would be a compatible donor and impinges on their friendship by pleading for Wilson to donate a portion of his own liver to save Tucker’s life. While Wilson feels that to do so would violate his professional ethics, he considers complying due to a sense of guilt over prescribing the double dose of chemotherapy that destroyed Tucker’s liver. House finds it asinine how that Wilson is blaming himself for treating his patient's cancer.

After seeing how Tucker had reunited with his estranged family in light of his dire situation and wishing to extend this time for him, Wilson finally relents to his friend's plea and plans to go ahead with the operation to donate a portion of his liver. Before the operation, Wilson asks House to be there for the operation. House refuses; "If you die, I'm alone,” House tells Wilson. As Wilson is being anesthetized, he sees House enter the viewing area above and smiles. After the operation, however, Tucker reverts to his selfish old ways, and tells Wilson, "The person you want when you're dying isn't the same person you want when you're living." Now that he is going to live, Tucker reveals he is summarily casting his family aside again to pursue another new love interest, one even younger (almost the same age as his own daughter). This makes Wilson lose respect for him.

Meanwhile, the relationship between Lisa Cuddy and Lucas Douglas continues, shown from Wilson's point of view. Cuddy wants to buy a new house through Wilson's realtor ex-wife, Bonnie, and is seeking House's approval, also indirectly through Wilson. Complaining that Cuddy has hurt him, House schemes to interfere with the relationship, again through Wilson. Later, Wilson takes House to the fancy new loft apartment that Cuddy wanted to buy, and tells House that Wilson bought it instead after Bonnie disclosed Cuddy's bid, allowing Wilson to beat Cuddy’s offer. Wilson explains that he did so because Cuddy had hurt his friend House and "deserved to be punished". Wilson and House also needed a bigger place to live in, "with space for a larger refrigerator!"

== Music ==
- "Faith" (by George Michael) performed by Hugh Laurie
- "A Slow Parade" by A.A. Bondy

== Critical response ==
Zack Handlen of The A.V. Club rated the episode A−, saying he really enjoyed the episode and was excited not because of big moments or shocking revelation but rather because of how well the friendship of House and Wilson was played.
