= China Shavers =

American actress (born 1977)

- Born: June 16, 1977 (age 49)
- Other name: China Jesusita Shavers
- Occupation: Actress
- Years active: 1996–present

China Shavers (born June 16, 1977) is an American actress best known for her supporting roles as Brooke Harper on the high school drama Boston Public and as Dreama on the supernatural sitcom Sabrina, the Teenage Witch.

== Career ==
Shavers had a recurring role on the TV series ER. Her guest-star appearances include roles in Beverly Hills, 90210, The District, Girlfriends and Sleeper Cell, among others. She appeared in films like National Lampoon's Adam & Eve, The Glass House, Not Another Teen Movie and Dorm Daze 2.

== Filmography ==
Film
Year	Title	Role	Notes
2000	Scary Movie	Shorty's Date	Uncredited
2001	The Glass House	E.B.	
2001	Not Another Teen Movie	North Compton Cheerleader	
2005	National Lampoon's Adam & Eve	Sarah	
2008	Killer Pad	Shirley	Uncredited
2010	Beginners	Shauna	
2021	Judas and the Black Messiah	College Student	

Television
Year	Title	Role	Notes
1996	Harambee!	Shanora	Movie
1997	New York Undercover	Dana Herrington	Episode: "Fade Out"
1998	Felicity	R.A. #5	Episode: "Drawing the Line: Part 1"
1999	Any Day Now	Shanice	Episode: "Trust Me"
1999	V.I.P.	Cheryl	Episode: "Val on the Run"
1999	Beverly Hills, 90210	Linda Barret	Episode: "Bobbi Dearest"
1999–2000	Sabrina, the Teenage Witch	Dreama	Recurring Cast: Season 4
2000	The District	Alicia Ray	Episode: "Pot Scrubbers"
2001	When Billie Beat Bobby	Basketball Girl	Movie
2001–03	Boston Public	Brooke Harper	26 episodes
2005	Sleeper Cell	Nichelle	Episode: "Immigrant"
2005–06	ER	Olivia Evans	7 episodes
2006	Twenty Questions	Angela Selfridge	Movie
2006	National Lampoon's Dorm Daze 2	Robin Daniels	Video
2007	Girlfriends	Alicia	Episode: "Time to Man Up"
2007	Without a Trace	Rhonda Brewer	Episode: "Baggage"
2010	Saving Grace	Maya Taylor	Episode: "Let's Talk"
2010	House	Hanna	Episode: "Help Me"
2019	The Twilight Zone	Air Marshal	Episode: "Nightmare at 30,000 Feet"
