= Esteban Powell =

American actor

- Occupation: Actor
- Years active: 1993–present

Esteban Powell is an American actor.

He attended the High School for the Performing and Visual Arts in Houston, a magnet school of the Houston Independent School District. He was cast in the role of Carl Burnett in the 1993 Richard Linklater film Dazed and Confused.

Since, he has appeared in the films Hysteria - The Def Leppard Story, Drake Bell: The Untitled Project (A Teaser), Runaways, Paper Cut, and Shiloh Falls among others. He has appeared in episodes of Beverly Hills, 90210, Touched by an Angel, CSI: Crime Scene Investigation, Reba, Dawson's Creek, Charmed, Gilmore Girls, House, In Plain Sight, and Monk. In 2000-2001, he played Jargon in Level 9. He co-starred in the A&E Network series The Cleaner, which ran for two seasons from 2008 to 2009.
