= The Choice (House) =

- House episode
- Episode no.: Season 6 Episode 20
- Directed by: Juan J. Campanella
- Written by: David Hoselton
- Original air date: May 3, 2010

Guest appearances
- Cynthia Watros as Dr. Sam Carr; Adam Garcia as Ted Taylor; Eva Amurri as Nicole Murray; Jennifer Crystal Foley as Rachel Taub; Jonathan Murphy as Cotter Macklin; Patrick Price as Nurse Jeffrey Sparkman

Episode chronology
← Previous "Open and Shut"	Next → "Baggage"
- House season 6

"The Choice" is the twentieth episode of the sixth season of the American medical drama House and it is the 129th episode overall. It aired on Fox on May 3, 2010. It was written by David Hoselton and directed by Juan J. Campanella. This was the first episode of House since the first seven episodes of season one to garner fewer than 10 million viewers for its initial air date.

== Plot ==
The team takes on the case of an ailing groom-to-be (guest star Adam Garcia) named Ted. He fainted at his wedding after having a round of aphasia (loss of voice). House unexpectedly pokes him with a needle and Ted says "ow." House claims Ted was faking to avoid getting married. However, he has a pleural effusion as he's being discharged.

Thirteen and Taub check where Ted lived before he moved into his fiancée's room, but the owner comes back and sees them. The owner, Cotter, claims to be Ted's ex-boyfriend of three years. The team tests Ted for HIV/AIDS but he's negative. Thirteen talks to him and finds out he had "treatment" to become heterosexual. He had electro convulsion therapy and was injected with many different chemicals. The chemicals could explain the pleural effusion and the ECT could explain the rest. The team thinks the ECT could have caused head trauma. During the EKG, Ted has a heart attack. Foreman decides to do an angiogram to see if it's blocks or bleeds. The team comes in to prep Ted for his angio, but every time he sits up he faints, and he stabilizes when he lies down. House thinks it could be postural orthostatic tachycardia syndrome (POTS), causing his blood pressure to plummet when he's upright.

While Ted is sleeping, Cotter comes to visit, but when he takes Ted's hand, Nicole asks him to leave. Nicole then confronts Ted about exactly who Cotter is. Ted admits he used to think he was gay, but got help and insists he is straight now. At that moment, Ted starts to have a severe headache. This leads House to think infection. Taub suggests cerebral infection, which would explain the headaches and cause POTS. It could also spread to the heart if it's fungal. House orders a spinal tap and says to run the CSF. But Ted tests negative for infections and his headaches get worse. House thinks the spinal tap caused Ted to spring a leak, worsening the headaches. Low pressure in the brain caused the POTS, not the other way around. However, Ted's face twists in a strange way. It's not POTS.

They get Nicole, Ted, and Cotter in the same room to redo Ted's history, hoping this time it will be more accurate. Nicole says Ted sometimes has erectile dysfunction, but Cotter claims they never had such problems. Taub suggests that arterial disease causing acute ischemia could explain the heart, neurological symptoms, and possibly even POTS. The test shows everything's normal with his penis' blood flow, but Ted starts to lactate. Taub suggests a pituitary tumor which could explain his libido and heart issues, and if the tumor's big enough, the headaches and syncope as well. The team checks his prolactin level and MRI his pituitary.

Talking to Wilson, House has an idea. Ted has an Arnold–Chiari malformation, a narrowing in the base of his skull. Ted's therapy caused his brain to swell just enough to plug the opening, cutting off his CSF. His brain pressing against his pituitary caused the other symptoms. He declares that he has chosen the life he wants to lead, that he loves his fiancée and wants to get married. She says she must make her choice and cannot marry him.

Meanwhile, House spends extracurricular time with his Princeton Plainsboro colleagues. Taub invites House to dinner, Thirteen invites him to come with her to a lesbian bar, and House performs a karaoke rendition of "Midnight Train to Georgia" with Foreman and Chase. It's revealed that Wilson has been setting House up for dates with his team members as he's concerned for House's well-being. He pays them to spend time with House so he has someone to be with while Wilson spends time with Sam. It also becomes apparent that House's pain is becoming too much to bear, as he starts turning to alcohol for relief.

The show closes with Cuddy asking House if he would go to dinner with her. She states that she wants to be friends, and House retorts, as the closing remark, that it is the last thing he wants, with the unspoken suggestion that he wants more. The last scene involves House stroking his leg in pain, glancing at ibuprofen before deciding to pull a bottle of alcohol from his desk and drinking.

== Response ==
=== Ratings ===
The episode accumulated 9.982 million US viewers and ranked 22nd in the week.

=== Critical reception ===
The episode was generally positively received.

Unrealityshout.com reviewed the episode very positively and said of it that: "House delivers his punchiest episode in weeks with The Choice. Greg House is at his absolute best when he's firing out acerbic one liners like a sniper with a machine gun full of sarcasm bullets..." but also noted that the sixth season had suffered slightly and that this particular episode redeemed it.

IGN gave the episode an "Impressive" score of 8.4 and noted that: "This was a strong episode filled with many overlapping themes, and unlike last week's mysterious illness which seemed to be cured from out of the blue, this week's diagnosis made for great TV as it was dripping with irony," and said in summary that "there was a lot to like about this episode, depressing as it may have been. The patient-of-the-week story arc was well plotted out and the diagnosis felt justified, albeit cruel."

TVFanatic gave the episode a score of 4.2/5.0 and praised it for being a "solid episode".
