= As Far as the Eye Can See =

Studio album by People in Planes
- Released: 28 March 2006
- Genre: Alternative rock; progressive rock; indie rock; art rock
- Length: 59:19
- Label: Wind-Up Records
- Producer: Dana Austin; Louis Read; Sam Williams

People in Planes chronology
People in Planes EP (2005)	As Far as the Eye Can See (2006)	Acoustic EP (2006)

Professional ratings
Review scores
Source	Rating
AllMusic	3.5/5 stars

As Far as the Eye Can See is the debut album of Welsh alternative rock band People in Planes (or second album overall, as 2002's Splendid Animation was released under the previous band name of Tetra Splendour), released on 28 March 2006. After being dropped by EMI, the band recorded a new album at Wales' Monnow Valley Studio, containing new songs (with newly hired keyboard player Ian Russell) and unreleased Tetra Splendour material.

The music video for the album's first single, "If You Talk Too Much (My Head Will Explode)", was directed by actor Joaquin Phoenix.

In 2008, the track "Light for the Deadvine" was featured in the penultimate scene of "Wilson's Heart", the season finale of the fourth season of the Fox medical drama series House.

== Track listing ==
No.	Title	Length
1.	"Barracuda"	3:51
2.	"For Miles Around (Scratch to Void)"	4:15
3.	"If You Talk Too Much (My Head Will Explode)"	4:32
4.	"Moth"	3:29
5.	"Rush"	3:59
6.	"Token Trapped Woman"	4:30
7.	"Falling by the Wayside"	4:13
8.	"My Black Widow"	4:15
9.	"Light for the Deadvine"	4:27
10.	"Penny"	6:28
11.	"Fire"	4:36
12.	"Narcoleptic"	6:59

== Personnel ==
- Gareth Jones - lead vocals (All tracks), keyboard (All tracks), brass (track 10), guitar
- Peter Roberts – synthesizer (All tracks), guitar (All tracks), brass arrangement (track 10), sampling (All tracks)
- Kris Blight - bass (All tracks)
- John Maloney – drums (All tracks)
- Sam Williams – acoustic guitar (track 3), producer (tracks 1–7, 9–11), fender rhodes (5), audio mixing (1–7, 9–11), brass arrangement (10), remix arrangement (10)

=== Technical personnel ===
- Gregg Wattenberg – production supervisor, A&R
- Jo Hunt – management
- John Davis & The Georgia Sea Island Singers – mastering
- Dan Austin – producer, engineer, mixing (tracks 8, 12, 10- original version)
- Diana Meltzer – A&R
- Louis Read – producer (track 10), engineer (1–7, 9–11), audio mixing (1–7, 9, 11), remixing (10)
- Darren Majewski – coordination, A&R
- Nathan Seabrook – inlay photography
- Jake Beaumont Nesbitt – management
- Emma Jayne Lewis – background vocals (track 5)
- Ted Jensen – mastering

Live keyboard player Ian Russell did not actually feature on As Far As The Eye Can See; he is not credited on the album's liner notes, and all keyboard parts on the album were played by Jones, Roberts and Williams.
