= Beyond the Horizon (People in Planes album) =

Studio album by People in Planes
- Released: September 9, 2008
- Genre: Alternative rock; indie rock; hard rock
- Length: 53:30
- Label: Wind-up
- Producer: Dan Austin; Matt Squire

People in Planes chronology
Acoustic EP (2006)	Beyond the Horizon (2008)	Gung Ho For Info EP (2009)

Professional ratings
Review scores
Source	Rating
AbsolutePunk.net	(86%) link
Allmusic	link

Beyond the Horizon is the second and final album by the Welsh alternative rock band People in Planes (or third album overall, as their first, 2002's Splendid Animation, was released under their previous band name, Tetra Splendour).

People In Planes were in pre-production for their second album for Wind-Up records since they returned from the States in late 2006. They took a period off to rehearse new material and played a string of UK shows in late 2006 and early 2007 where they road-tested new material. New song titles include: "Baked", "Evil With You", "Get On The Flaw", "Human Error", "Better Than Life", "I Wish That You'd Fall Apart" and "Tonight (The Sun Will Rise)" On February 7, 2008 People In Planes released Pretty Buildings, the first song from Beyond The Horizon as an internet download through Myspace and the band's mailing list.

Hey people. I hereby declare People In Planes are back! Our new project was recorded with four different producers in six studios across Wales, England and America, and we've put our entire souls into it. It's been a long wait for all of us, and we're really excited to present this first track to you- "Pretty Buildings". --Gareth, Peter, Kris, John and Ian

The band headed out to SXSW in March to showcase songs from the new album before joining Jupiter One on a co-headlining tour across the States between March and April. Guitarist Peter Roberts blogged from the road on the band's Myspace revealing that the first radio single is set to be M'aidez, M'aidez, due sometime before the end of the first run of shows. On March 26, 2008, the first video from Beyond The Horizon, for the song Pretty Buildings, was released online as a purevolume exclusive. In addition, on this date the splash page of the band's website changed revealing Beyond The Horizon as the title of the album with a tentative release date of Summer 2008.

The first single from Beyond the Horizon, "Mayday (M'aidez)," was made available only on Amazon on May 20, along with "Last Man Standing" and the "Pretty Buildings" video.

== Track listing ==
CD
No.	Title	Writer(s)	Length
1.	"Last Man Standing"	Peter Roberts	4:26
2.	"Mayday (M'aidez)"	Roberts	4:46
3.	"Get on the Flaw"	Roberts	4:26
4.	"Pretty Buildings"	Gareth Jones, Roberts	4:12
5.	"Better Than Life"	Roberts, Natasha Schneider	4:35
6.	"Flesh and Blood"	Roberts	3:34
7.	"Beyond the Horizon"	Roberts	5:17
8.	"Know by Now"	Jones	4:02
9.	"Tonight the Sun Will Rise"	Roberts	3:51
10.	"I Wish You'd Fall Apart"	Roberts	5:28
11.	"Vampire"	Jones	3:45
12.	"Evil with You"	Roberts	5:08

iTunes Bonus Track Version
No.	Title	Length
13.	"Step Out On the Wing" (Bonus Track)	3:35
14.	"Pretty Buildings" (Video)	4:26

== Music video ==
The music video for "Pretty Buildings", the most popular track in the album, was initially uploaded to YouTube on April 4, 2008. It was uploaded again through VEVO on December 2, 2009.

The video starts with a view of a city in a rainy night. The camera enters the window of one of the buildings, where a woman arriving home and sitting on her desk to draw. She picks up a note which reads "Break the silence. It's been waiting for too long". The camera zooms into the note and shows a cartoonized city, zooms into a window, and shows a man sitting at a desk and handcrafting an undefined object from toothpicks and cardboard.

Then, objects such as hammers and scissors are seen spinning in the air, and the camera goes through a window floating in the air, where two people sit at a table with food and a CRT television that shows many televisions inside of it. Then, objects such as scissors and cassette tapes and televisions are seen spinning in the air at a different location.

After that, cutscenes between the earlier two desks are shown, and with letters of words written down by the first woman floating in the air. The table with the television is shown again; the man picks up the television from the table, throws it, and it gets stuck in mid-air and spins. The camera pans out of the window. The video ends with a scene of a city at night, with objects spinning in the air outside.

== Personnel ==
- Dan Austin – producer, engineer
- Kris Blight – bass
- Andy Ellis – mixing
- Michael Halsband – photography
- Ted Jensen – mastering
- Gareth Hughes Jones – Guitar, vocals
- Darren Majewski – A&R
- John Maloney – drums
- Diana Meltzer – A&R
- Mike Mongillo – product manager
- Pete Roberts - Guitar, vocals
- Ed Sherman – art direction
- Matt Squire – producer, engineer
- Gregg Wattenberg – production supervisor, A&R
