= Baggage (House) =

- House episode
- Episode no.: Season 6 Episode 21
- Directed by: David Straiton
- Written by: Doris Egan; David Foster
- Original air date: May 10, 2010

Guest appearances
- Lin-Manuel Miranda as Juan "Alvie" Álvarez; Cynthia Watros as Dr. Sam Carr; Zoe McLellan as Sidney Merrick/Ms. X; David Monahan as Jay Merrick; Carl Gilliard as Dutch Hightower; Paul Keeley as Mr. Harris; Andre Braugher as Dr. Darryl Nolan

Episode chronology
← Previous "The Choice"	Next → "Help Me"
- House season 6

"Baggage" is the twenty-first episode of the sixth season of the American medical drama House. It aired on Fox on May 10, 2010. The episode deals with Dr. Nolan trying to help House by getting him to recount the events of the past week. The critical response was generally positive.

== Plot ==
The episode is set from the viewpoint of House and Dr. Nolan (guest star Andre Braugher), looking into House's past week to try to work out why House is showing signs of being upset and unperceptive.

During the session with Dr. Nolan, House recounts the case of a woman (guest star Zoe McLellan) who arrives at the Princeton Plainsboro emergency room with an unexplained illness and amnesia. While trying to solve the mystery of the woman's illness, House also helps her piece together her identity based on clues such as her running gear.

In the side story about House's private life, Wilson kicks him out of the condo due to his ex-wife Sam moving in with him. Back in his own apartment, House finds his roommate from Mayfield, Juan "Alvie" Alvarez (guest star Lin-Manuel Miranda) has not only occupied the place but also sold several highly valuable items in order to finance some questionable redecoration. Throughout this episode, they spend time retrieving those items. Another theme is Alvie's problems with being recognized as an American citizen because he has lost all documents proving his national background. Ultimately, House solves these problems by faking a DNA test, scientifically linking Alvie to his probably Puerto Rican mother. He also recovers the books sold by Alvie. One of them happens to be a very rare book by Cuddy's great-grandfather.

Back in the medical story, the patient's situation continually worsens, finally looking hopeless. However, when she is moved to the operating theater she happens to be pushed through some UV light, where House spots the remnants of a tattoo and diagnoses her as having an allergic reaction to the ink, with the allergy having been triggered by the patient's regular extreme long-distance running. Based on that diagnosis, her death is averted and a full recovery seems possible.

With Nolan, House realizes that everyone around him is happy and moving in together (Cuddy and Lucas, Wilson and Sam, and even in a way Alvie and his cousin), except him. Even after having taken Dr. Nolan's advice for a year, he still feels miserable. He blames Nolan for his loneliness and accuses him of being nothing more than a faith healer. Enraged, House leaves Dr. Nolan.

== Reception ==
=== Viewership ===
Baggage ranked 27th in viewership.

=== Critical response ===
Critical response was from generally positive to muted, most reviewers noting the change in pace and the similarities to the episode Three Stories.

IGN reviewer Jonah Krakow gave the episode an "Impressive" score of 8.3 and said "This episode itself was well-done even if the main character is tough to root for. I enjoyed the switch in storytelling styles with flashbacks coming from an unreliable narrator, and I loved how Andre Braugher continued his role as both an advocate and adversary to House. It was about time he returned to this show. As for House, it's difficult to watch someone slowly sink into deep depression, especially when he's dug all the holes himself. Regardless of how well-written the episode was, it's frustrating that with one episode left this season, it seems like any progress House made during the first few episodes was all for naught and he's right back where he started." and also negatively noted that: "House is a brilliant character and often hysterically funny, but he's also frustrating as hell."

Unrealityshout.com praised the episode as breaking House tradition and called it a "welcome diversion from the usual format of the show, and a lead-in to the last episode of the series..."

TVfanatic.com gave the episode a 3.5/5 praising the episode but saying that some of it worked and some of it did not, but said that "Overall, it's hard to complain too much when the show leaves its typical, procedural episode set-up. I must give it credit for trying something different and I could also watch Hugh Laurie and Braugher simply exchange home decorating tips for an hour. They're great together.

Zack Handlen of The A.V. Club gave this episode a B rating.
