= House's Head =

- House episode
- Episode no.: Season 4 Episode 15
- Directed by: Greg Yaitanes
- Story by: Doris Egan
- Teleplay by: Peter Blake; David Foster; Russel Friend; Garrett Lerner
- Original air date: May 12, 2008
- Running time: 44 minutes

Guest appearances
- Anne Dudek as Dr. Amber Volakis; Henry Hayashi as the bus driver; Julie Ariola as Nurse Dickerson; Fred Durst as the bartender; Ivana Milicevic as "the answer"

Episode chronology
← Previous "Living the Dream"	Next → "Wilson's Heart"
- House season 4

"House's Head" is the fifteenth episode of the fourth season of House and the eighty-fifth episode overall. It was the first part of the two-part season four finale, the second part being "Wilson's Heart". Co-written by several House producers and directed by Greg Yaitanes, "House's Head" premiered on May 12, 2008, on Fox.

The episode revolves around Dr. Gregory House (Hugh Laurie), who, after being involved in a bus accident, vaguely remembers seeing someone who is "going to die". House tries to trace back his steps throughout the episode to find out the identity of this person. A woman (Ivana Miličević), who claims to be "the answer", guides House through hallucinations about the crash. The episode eventually ends in a cliffhanger.

14.84 million American viewers watched the broadcasting of "House's Head", making House the ninth most-watched program of the week. The episode was submitted for five Primetime Emmy Awards, from which two nominations followed. Greg Yaitanes won the Emmy for "Outstanding Directing for a Drama Series", but Hugh Laurie lost the award in the category "Outstanding Lead Actor in a Drama Series" to Bryan Cranston of AMC's Breaking Bad.

== Plot ==
Dr. Gregory House is getting a lap dance in a strip club when he suddenly realizes he has no memory of the past four hours. Inexplicably, he suddenly knows someone somewhere is dying, and he has no idea who it is. When he leaves the club, he sees that the bus he was traveling on has crashed. Back at Princeton-Plainsboro Teaching Hospital, House is diagnosed with a concussion and post-traumatic retrograde amnesia and orders his team to check the bus driver for a possible seizure that precipitated the crash.

While the team investigates the bus driver's condition, House overdoses on Vicodin and starts to hallucinate. He finds himself back on the bus, where he sees a woman who was not on the bus. However, before House can speak to her, Wilson awakens him to do an MRI on him. When House returns to the bus hallucination, Cuddy is with him. As they discuss the bus driver's possible diseases, House realizes they are in his head and tells Cuddy to accompany the discussion with a striptease. The woman from House's earlier hallucination returns and introduces herself as "the answer". She tells House to look at the bus driver's shuffling feet, which House believes to indicate Parkinson's disease. When the bus driver needs to be intubated due to a possible clot from a pulmonary embolism, House notices the driver's recent dental work. He reasons that an air bubble being accidentally injected into the patient's bloodstream through the gums would explain all the symptoms. House believes the case to be over, but a dream that night causes him to realize that the bus driver is not the patient he saw suffering from symptoms; the crash merely dislodged the air bubble and caused the driver's problems.

In a renewed attempt to retrieve his memory, House has his team re-enact the bus crash. House overdoses on physostigmine and his mind flashes back to the bus scene before the accident. "The answer" keeps asking House what her necklace is made from, until he realizes that it's made of amber. "The answer" transforms into Amber Volakis, and when Wilson and Cuddy manage to resuscitate House from his overdose-induced cardiac arrest, he immediately informs Wilson that Amber was on the bus with him, and was injured in the crash, meaning she was the one who was dying.

== Production ==
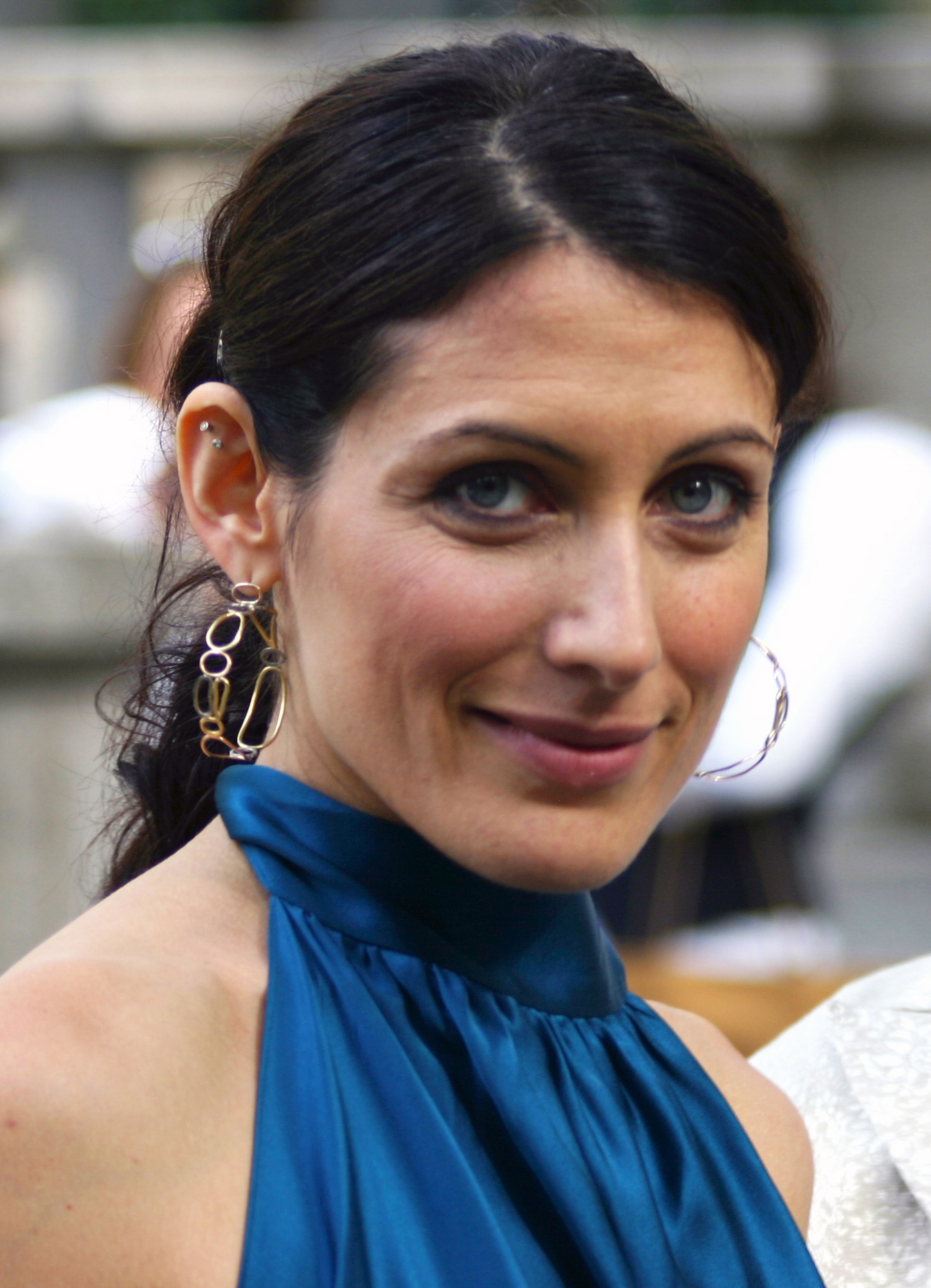
Actress Lisa Edelstein, who plays Dr. Lisa Cuddy, did a striptease in the episode, commenting, "You do it for your own enjoyment".

"House's Head" was the fourth House episode directed by Greg Yaitanes. It was written by Peter Blake, David Foster, Russel Friend, Garrett Lerner and Doris Egan. Executive producer Katie Jacobs said that the season finale was "a little bit different" than the episodes preceding it. "House's Head" was supposed to air after Super Bowl XLII but due to the 2007-2008 WGA Strike the episode was derailed, and the House season 4 episode "Frozen" was aired instead. The T-shirt House wears in the episodes, which shows a skeleton drinking coffee, and says "Coffin Break", was created by a designer named Taavo.

When Lisa Edelstein (Dr. Cuddy) heard she had to do a strip scene in the episode, she called actress Sheila Kelley, wife of Richard Schiff (with whom Edelstein had worked previously on The West Wing and Relativity). Kelley had worked on the film Dancing at the Blue Iguana and Edelstein sought her advice on choreographing the striptease. On the episode itself, Edelstein commented: "It is very interesting what happens in the first half of the finale in terms of learning about how House sees people and getting the world from his point of view entirely". Before the filming of the scene started, Edelstein showed the dance to Hugh Laurie, who, according to Edelstein, was "incredibly supportive, like a cheerleader". Edelstein commented that after the scene was filmed she, "felt beautiful, and it ended up being a really lovely experience".

The whole bus-crash sequence was storyboarded. Greg Yaitanes described stunt-coordinator Jim Vickers as "crucial" for the filming of this sequence. The bus crash scene was filmed in a studio using a big spinning wheel (which Anne Dudek referred to as a "gadget"). This gadget was mainly the back of the bus, and could be turned 360 degrees to increase the authenticity of the scene. For the rest of the bus, a greenscreen was used that surrounded the complete outside of the bus. The shots involving Anne Dudek were filmed at another time, using light effects and people simulating a bus crash experience in the otherwise motionless gadget.

== Reception ==
=== Ratings ===
The episode premiered in the US on May 12, 2008, on Fox. The episode was viewed within five hours of broadcast by 14.84 million viewers, and had a 5.8/14 share of the 18-49 demographic. It was the second most-watched program of the night, beaten only by Dancing with the Stars. In the week from May 11, 2008, to May 18, 2008 "House's Head" was the ninth most-watched program. The show was watched by 15.02 million viewers on Live + SD television. In Australia, the episode aired May 12, 2008, on Network Ten, where it was watched by 1,432,000 viewers, making it the night's second most watched program. It ranked fourth most-watched show in the 18-49 demographic. In Canada, the episode was broadcast on Global Total, also on May 12. It was watched by 2.296 million viewers, making it the week's fourth most watched program, behind Grey's Anatomy and American Idol (Tuesday and Wednesday). 1.7 million viewers watched the episode's first broadcast on United Kingdom's Five on June 26, 2008.

=== Critical reaction ===
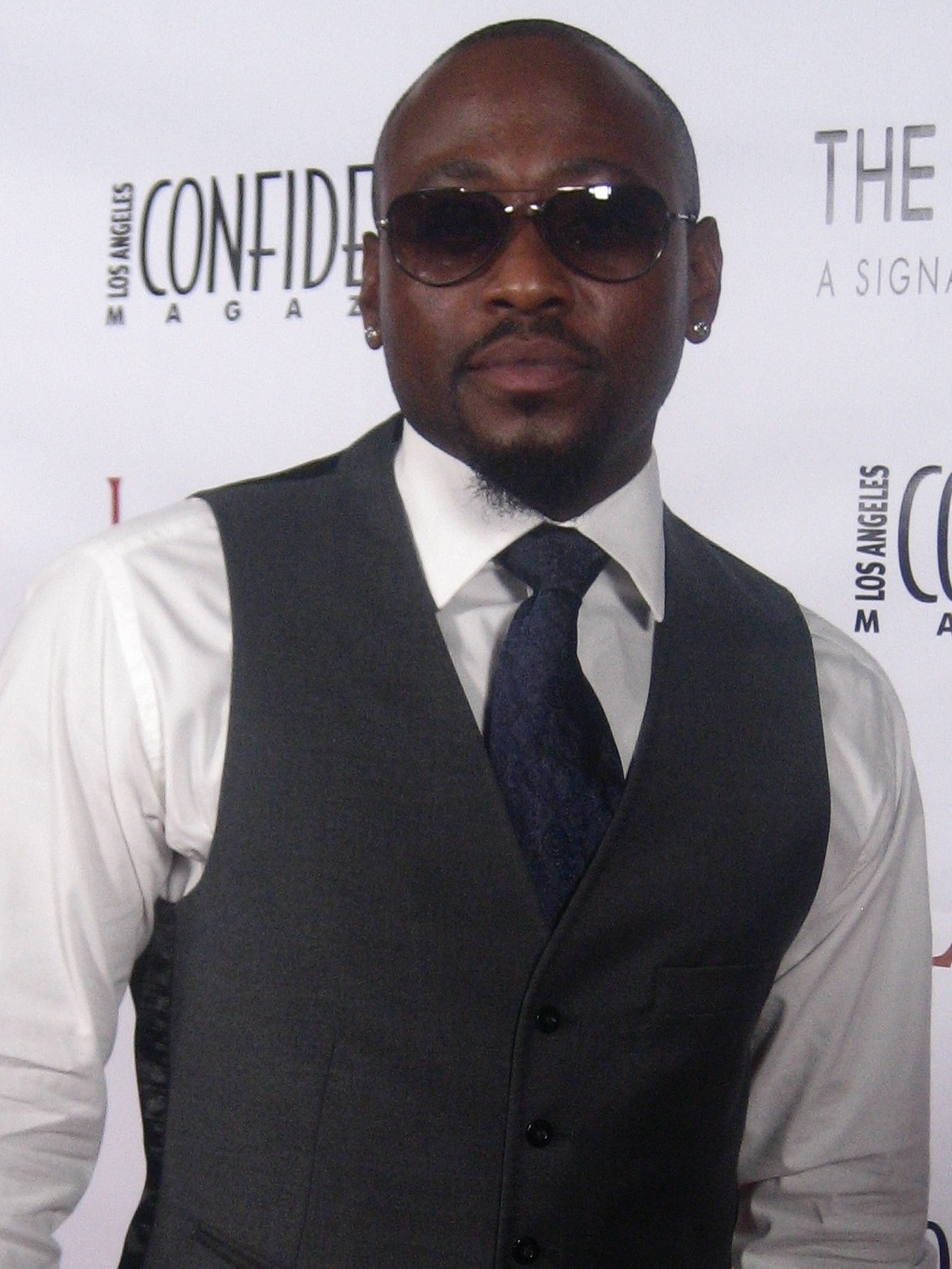
"House's Head" and "Wilson's Heart" are Omar Epps' favorite House episodes.

Overall, "House's Head" was very well received by critics. Sara Morrison, from Television Without Pity, called the moment that House gets back his memory "the best ten minutes of television you might ever see". She was also pleased with the hypnotism scene, because it gave Chase "something to do". Morrison graded the episode with an A+. Michelle Romero, of Entertainment Weekly, said that she can watch "House's Head" twice and get as much out of the second viewing as the first. TV Guide's Gina Dinunno stated: "It's everything I imagined: brilliant, snarky, confusing; even dirty! They did an amazing job at leaving us with the cliffhanger of all cliffhangers as we wait to see what will happen to Amber". Alan Sepinwall, from The Star-Ledger, compared the episode to the House season two finale "No Reason". He, however, also said that the episode had "several issues", mainly the hints towards "the answer" being Amber. On this, Sepinwall commented "House is, at heart, a mystery, and when the show telegraphs the solution, it isn't half as entertaining".

James Chamberlin, of IGN, said that he hoped the second part of the season finale could live up to the first half. He also said that the scenes revolving around "the answer" reminded him of The Matrix. Chamberlin graded the episode with a 9.5 on a ten scale. Barbara Barnett, of Blog Critics, praised both Hugh Laurie's and Lisa Edelstein's acting performances. She also said that, although there were many "memorable moments" in the episode, the scene in which the bus crashed was "intense", "tension-filled" and "heart-stopping". Maureen Ryan of Chicago Tribune's The Watcher stated that, although she did predict the twist about midway through the episode, there were "so many other enjoyable elements" that it didn't bother her. Jennifer Godwin of E! said the episode was "easily one of House's best finales ever". Also, several critics were surprised by Fred Durst's brief cameo as the bartender in House's flashback.

The scene in which Lisa Cuddy did a pole dance was very positively received by critics, Mary McNarma, of the Los Angeles Times, stated that these scenes "in three minutes earned back the price of TiVo". James Chamberlin of IGN stated that he never expected Edelstein to do a striptease, although he had hoped it. In season four DVD commentary, Jesse Spencer, Lisa Edelstein, Anne Dudek, Jennifer Morrison and Omar Epps all stated that "House's Head" and "Wilson's Heart" are their favorite House episodes.

=== Awards ===
Cast members Lisa Edelstein, Jesse Spencer and Hugh Laurie submitted the episode for Primetime Emmy Awards on their behalf. In the categories Outstanding Supporting Actress in a Drama Series (Edelstein), Outstanding Supporting Actor in a Drama Series (Spencer) and Outstanding Lead Actor in a Drama Series (Laurie). Peter Blake, David Foster, Russel Friend, Garrett Lerner and Doris Egan, the writers of the episode, submitted the episode on their behalf for a Primetime Emmy Award for Outstanding Writing for a Drama Series. The episode was also given up for consideration in the category Outstanding Directing for a Drama Series on behalf of director Greg Yaitanes. Hugh Laurie and Greg Yaitanes' submissions both came through as nominations. Yaitanes won the award, but Laurie lost the award to Bryan Cranston for his performance in AMC's Breaking Bad.

== See also ==
- Fantastic Voyage, the subject of a joke by Dr. Taub
