= Middle of Nowhere (2008 film) =

- Theatrical release poster
- Directed by: John Stockwell
- Written by: Michelle Morgan
- Produced by: John Stockwell; Michel Litvak; David Lancaster; Nicole Rocklin
- Starring: Eva Amurri; Susan Sarandon; Anton Yelchin; Justin Chatwin; Willa Holland
- Cinematography: Byron Shah
- Edited by: Tom McArdle
- Music by: Ferraby Lionheart
- Production companies: Bold Films; Louisiana Media
- Distributed by: Image Entertainment
- Release date: September 6, 2008 (Toronto)
- Running time: 95 minutes
- Country: United States
- Language: English

Middle of Nowhere is a 2008 coming-of-age comedy-drama film directed by John Stockwell, written by Michelle Morgan, and starring Susan Sarandon and her real-life daughter, Eva Amurri. It premiered at the 2008 Toronto International Film Festival.

== Plot ==
The film follows Grace (Eva Amurri), a young woman whose irresponsible mother, Rhonda (Susan Sarandon), ruins her daughter's credit rating. Rhonda uses the money to finance Grace's younger sister, Taylor's (Willa Holland), modeling campaign. While working a summer job, Grace meets the lonely Dorian Spitz (Anton Yelchin) and they start selling drugs together for extra cash. A love triangle forms when Dorian is attracted to Grace, who is interested in Ben Pretzler (Justin Chatwin).

== Cast ==
- Eva Amurri as Grace Berry
- Susan Sarandon as Rhonda Berry
- Anton Yelchin as Dorian Spitz
- Justin Chatwin as Ben Pretzler
- Willa Holland as Taylor Elizabeth Berry
- Scott A. Martin as Morris Kraven
- Kenny Bordes as Ryan
- Kyle Clements as Ted

== Production ==
On May 14, 2007, it was announced that John Stockwell would direct the film, with Eva Amurri and Susan Sarandon attached to star and principal photography set to begin in September. On July 10, 2007, Anton Yelchin, Justin Chatwin, and Willa Holland joined the cast.

The film was shot at several locations in Baton Rouge, Louisiana, including the Blue Bayou Water Park and the LSU Quad.
