= List of House characters =

This page is a comprehensive list and description of the various characters who appear, from time to time, in the television series House. The list is divided episode-wise, as well as character-wise, and includes recurring characters, such as Rachel Taub, and Dominika, as well as characters who appear in only a few episodes, such as Juan Alvarez (House) and Steve McQueen (the rat).

== Main characters ==
=== Senior doctors ===
- Dr. Gregory House (Hugh Laurie) – Department Head: Diagnostic Medicine. Dr. Gregory House is a rebellious diagnostician with a double specialty in infectious disease and nephrology. Dr. House utterly lacks a bedside manner and prefers to avoid direct contact with his patients however possible. Due to an infarction in his right thigh, House lost a substantial portion of the muscle in his upper leg and must use a cane to assist with walking (although, where most would hold the cane in the hand opposite the injured leg, House holds the cane on the same side as his injury). As a result, House is also forced to deal with constant physical pain, which he manages through a dependency on the prescription pain medication Vicodin. Although his behavior can border on antisocial, misanthropic or sociopathic, House is viewed as a genius physician whose unconventional thinking and excellent instincts have afforded him a great deal of respect and an unusual level of tolerance from his colleagues and the medical world. House is eventually replaced by Chase after he fakes his death in the series finale, "Everybody Dies."
- Dr. Lisa Cuddy (Lisa Edelstein) – Administration: Dean of Medicine, endocrinologist. Dr. Cuddy attended the University of Michigan for graduate studies, where she first met Gregory House. She has the distinction of being one of the few characters on the show (Dr. Wilson being the other) who can match wits with the silver-tongued Dr. House in conversation (and arguments) and be considered one of his "friends". She often is left to pick up the pieces of House's questionable medical practices. She is also one of the few people who can stand House's hostile manner, strange requests, and his many crude (sometimes nosy) habits. Although she frequently criticizes House's methods, she does trust his decisions to be in the best interest of his patients. Over the course of the show, it is seen that she is one of the few, if not only, people who would hire House at all, due to widespread disapproval of House's results-oriented methods and constant insubordination. A developing arc in season five indicates that she has (and may have always had) very strong feelings for House; in season five's "Saviors" she refuses to answer when asked if she is in love with House, dismissing it as "a ridiculous question." House has described her as a second rate doctor. In season seven, Cuddy and House start dating but she eventually breaks up with him when he starts using Vicodin again during her health scare. She leaves the hospital after House drives his car into her house and she is replaced by Dr. Foreman in the beginning of Season 8.
- Dr. James Wilson (Robert Sean Leonard) – Department Head: Oncology. Dr. Wilson is House's best friend. Wilson is very popular and well-respected by both his colleagues and his patients, making his close friendship with the anti-social House especially puzzling to the other hospital employees. Wilson claims that his job and his "stupid, screwed up friendship" with House are the two most important things to him. He, along with Cuddy, usually finds himself aiding and abetting House's Vicodin addiction and his very eccentric methods. In Season 8, Wilson is diagnosed with cancer. Wilson is said to have 5 months to live. Wilson is one of the few people to know that House faked his death and, along with House, quits his job as a doctor.
- Dr. Eric Foreman (Omar Epps) – Assistant Department Head: Diagnostic Medicine, neurologist; attended Johns Hopkins Medical School. Of all the members of House's staff, it is strongly implied that Foreman performed better than the other fellows academically throughout college and medical school. However, during the pilot, House tells Foreman that a major factor in his hiring was the fact that he was a former juvenile delinquent who once stole cars and had 'street smarts'. As a result, he frequently voices his disapproval of House's rebellious methods and bold decisions. Foreman resigned at the end of Season 3, feeling that the more time he spent with House, the more he became like him. Foreman then took a position as Head of Diagnostic Medicine at New York Mercy Hospital. During that time, he saved a patient's life by going against their protocols, something that House frequently does. Foreman is then told that while he may have saved the patient's life, he cannot be there if he cannot be trusted to obey his senior medical officers. Foreman is then fired. Although he applied at other medical facilities, no one would hire him because of the incident, attributing it to his past association with House. He later returned to Princeton-Plainsboro because Cuddy was the only person willing to hire him after his actions. At the beginning of season 6 he was made Department Head of Diagnostic Medicine after House briefly quit but was back to being a fellow when House got his medical license reinstated. He becomes the Dean of Medicine after the departure of Cuddy in the beginning of season 8.
- Dr. Allison Cameron (Jennifer Morrison) – Department Head: Emergency Medicine, immunologist. Cameron was written as an eager and honest character and the most empathetic of the team. Her character history reveals an early marriage to a victim of thyroid cancer, whose subsequent death had a lasting impact on her. In the first season, she has a flirtatious relationship with House, but eventually embarks upon an on-again, off-again relationship affair with Robert Chase. Cameron resigned at the end of Season 3, but returned in Season 4 as a member of the Princeton-Plainsboro Emergency Room staff. She does eventually marry Chase, although she ends up divorcing him after he intentionally killed a patient who happened to be the genocidal dictator of a war-torn third world country, stating that Chase, like House, had no regard for the sanctity of life. But during a hospital lockdown in which they're stuck in an exam room together, Cameron admits to Chase that she still hadn't gotten past her first husband's death.
- Dr. Robert Chase (Jesse Spencer) – Surgeon, intensive care specialist. Dr. Chase's demeanor appears to have been either influenced or enabled by House, as he has previously displayed a reputation for mocking patients behind their backs, receiving joy in watching House lay into others, finds House's antics more humorous than others do, and repeats House's mantra of "everybody lies" whenever a patient's full disclosure of any required medical history is called into question. Moreover, when suggesting treatments to diagnoses, Chase is arguably the most creative member of House's staff, often proposing unconventional treatments that had not previously been considered, but whose perceived effectiveness is generally agreed upon. Chase was fired by House at the end of Season 3, but was hired as a member of Princeton-Plainsboro's surgical staff in Season 4. He returned as a Diagnostic Fellow in Season 6. He is infamous for his intentional killing of President Dibala, an African dictator the team treated, which ended up destroying his marriage and causing him almost endless amounts of guilt despite him claiming it was the right thing to do, as Dibala would have massacred his Sitibi countrymen had he survived. Chase eventually replaces House as the Director of Diagnostic Medicine after House fakes his death in the series finale, "Everybody Dies."

=== Diagnostic team ===
==== Seasons 1–3 ====
The original diagnostic team consisted of Dr. Cameron, Dr. Chase and Dr. Foreman. While both of their tenures had brief interruptions, Chase and Cameron still appeared semi-regularly on the show. They advise the newer fellows in the Diagnostic Department in seasons 4–5, or participate in cases directly when appropriate.

- Dr. Allison Cameron (Jennifer Morrison)
- Dr. Robert Chase (Jesse Spencer)
- Dr. Eric Foreman (Omar Epps)

==== Seasons 4–5 ====
Following the events of the season 3 finale, House began a long-running competition to select a new diagnostic team, progressively eliminating "contestants" from an original pool of 40 applicants. This story arc ran throughout the first half of season 4, from "The Right Stuff" through "Games". His final team consists of Dr. Foreman and the three successful "contestants": Dr. Taub, Dr. Kutner, and "Thirteen".

- Dr. Eric Foreman (Omar Epps)
- Dr. Lawrence Kutner (Kal Penn) was a sports medicine specialist. Out of all the fellows, Kutner was the most enthusiastic and the one most likely to go along with House in taking risks. In the season 5 episode "Simple Explanation", Kutner died by suicide. Actor Kal Penn needed to depart from the series to work in the Obama Administration, hence his character being written out of the show.
- Dr. Chris Taub (Peter Jacobson) is a plastic surgeon who has proved adept at, like House, working around the "rules" that Cuddy imposes. Ironically, Cuddy suggested that Taub become a member of House's new diagnostic team because his knowledge and combative nature would be able to keep House focused. Though married, he had already cheated on his wife, and has made comments that suggest he would be willing to do so again. After he divorces his wife, he has two illegitimate children, one each with his ex-wife and a nurse at the hospital.
- Dr. Remy "Thirteen" Hadley (Olivia Wilde) is an internist. Her nickname originates in the numbers that House assigned to each of his fellowship applications in "The Right Stuff", with hers being #13. She is noted for the many mysteries surrounding her character.

==== Season 6 ====
- Dr. Gregory House (Hugh Laurie) is a temporary consultant for the Department of Diagnostic Medicine while waiting to be reinstated. He later returns to the position of Head of Department in "Teamwork".
- Dr. Eric Foreman (Omar Epps) is the temporary Head of Diagnostic Medicine between "Epic Fail" and "Known Unknowns".
- Dr. Allison Cameron (Jennifer Morrison) returns temporarily to the diagnostic team between "The Tyrant" and "Teamwork".
- Dr. Robert Chase (Jesse Spencer) returns to the diagnostic team in "The Tyrant".
- Dr. Remy "Thirteen" Hadley (Olivia Wilde) is fired from the diagnostic team in "Epic Fail" and returns in "Teamwork".
- Dr. Chris Taub (Peter Jacobson) quits the team in "Epic Fail" and returns in "Teamwork".

==== Season 7 ====
- Dr. Eric Foreman (Omar Epps)
- Dr. Robert Chase (Jesse Spencer)
- Dr. Chris Taub (Peter Jacobson)
- Dr. Remy "Thirteen" Hadley (Olivia Wilde) (episode 1, episodes 18–23)
- Martha M. Masters (Amber Tamblyn) (episodes 6–19)

==== Season 8 ====
- Dr. Chi Park (Charlyne Yi) (episodes 2–22)
- Dr. Remy "Thirteen" Hadley (Olivia Wilde) (episode 3, 21–22)
- Dr. Jessica Adams (Odette Annable) (episodes 3–22)
- Dr. Robert Chase (Jesse Spencer) (episodes 5–20, 22)
- Dr. Chris Taub (Peter Jacobson) (episodes 5–22)

== Recurring characters ==
=== Edward Vogler ===
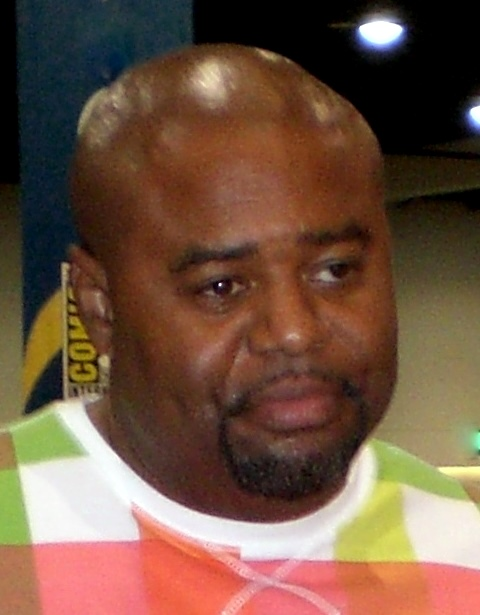
Chi McBride

Edward Vogler (Chi McBride) is the billionaire owner of a pharmaceutical firm and, in a season 1 story arc, became the new chairman of the board of Princeton–Plainsboro Teaching Hospital (PPTH), a position he gained through a $100 million donation to the hospital. Vogler sought to reshape PPTH into a testing facility for his firm's new drugs and saw House's maverick ways and blatant disregard for rules and authority figures as a substantial legal and financial liability. When House refused to conform to Vogler's increasingly capricious demands (including an order for House to fire one of his fellows) and even publicly bashed Vogler's company at a press banquet, Vogler gave the board an ultimatum: fire House, or lose Vogler's grant. After losing Wilson from the board, and a last ditch and impassioned motion from Cuddy for the board members to put the hospital's independence ahead of Vogler's donation, the board voted to retain House, therefore losing Vogler and his $100 million.

Fox demanded a bad guy to be added to the show, a few months before House went on a Christmas hiatus. Shore opposed Fox's request, because he thought adding such a character would be a bad idea. Although Shore thought he managed to convince the producers not to add the character, during his vacation in Israel, he was informed that Jeff Zucker, the head of the Universal studio, had threatened to cut the season short by six episodes unless the character was added. To prevent this from happening, Shore created the character. McBride was hired to film five episodes. However, the producers decided not to extend the character's story arc. In a video, David Shore said: "Chi McBride is so larger than life. He’s literally just a physically imposing person, and we just wanted someone who could really clash with House, somebody who could be emotionally and physically and psychologically imposing as he is and could go head to head with him."

=== Stacy Warner ===
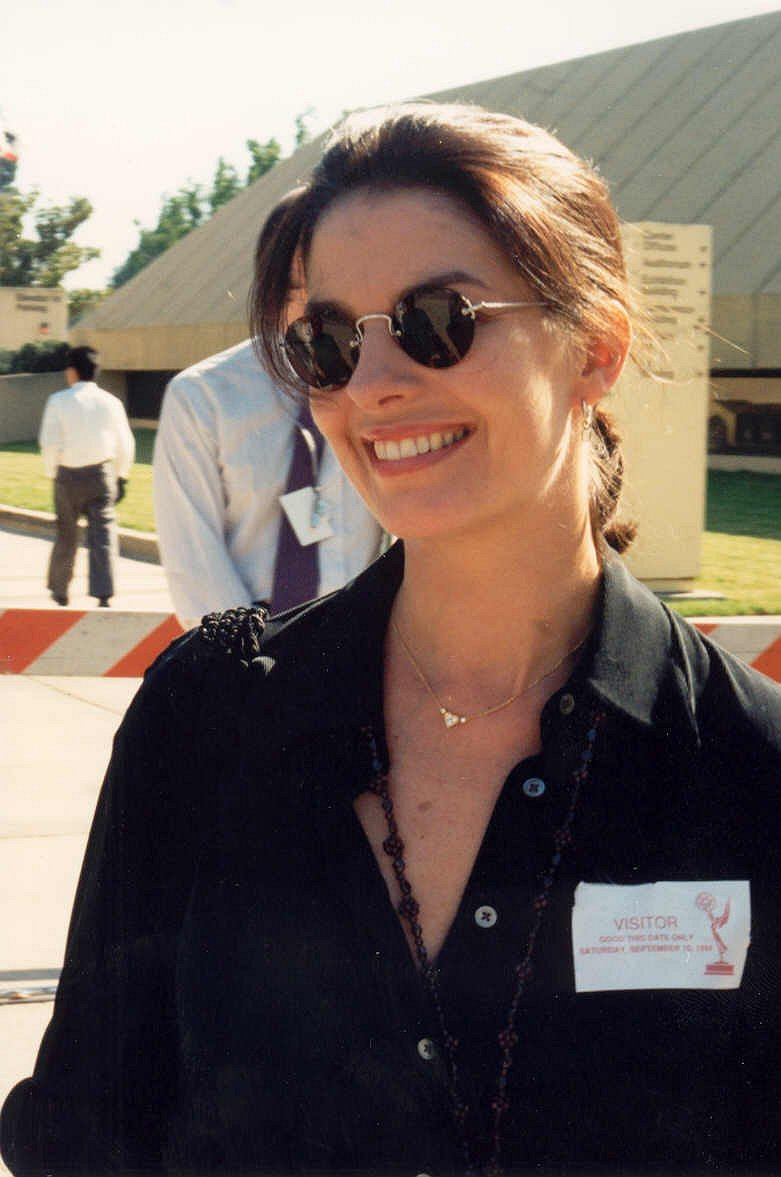
Sela Ward

Stacy Warner (Sela Ward) was Dr. House's former live-in girlfriend (for five years), a Constitutional lawyer and Duke University graduate. Two years after their breakup, she married Mark Warner. She appears in 9 episodes during the run of season 2, taking a job at PPTH (after asking Cuddy to make sure it was okay with House) to be close to her husband during his recovery.

House and Stacy's relationship has been strained due to his relentless attempts to prove she still has feelings for him. Mark aided House's cause by driving a wedge between himself and his wife when he suspects a brewing affair. Mark was eventually proven correct, as Stacy fell for House all over again and they slept together. As Stacy prepared to leave her husband for House, he then rejected her (stating that he could not make her happy, because he could not change). She quit her job at the hospital and went back home to Short Hills with Mark. An enraged Wilson believed House broke her heart not out of guilt for Mark (which is not his modus), but as a last-ditch resort to ensure that House does not allow himself happiness. The aftermath of this botched affair left House in a stark depression. Stacy did not appear on the show again, until the series finale "Everybody Dies".

In the episode "Son of Coma Guy", when playing a questions game with a patient to make a diagnosis, House admitted that he had been in love once. He said they met when she shot him in a game of paintball, Doctors vs Lawyers. Presumably, House was talking about Stacy. When the patient asked if that was the only time he'd ever been in love, House avoided answering and changed the subject.

Stacy made her final appearance, her first in six seasons, in the series finale "Everybody Dies" as both a hallucination of House and an attendee of his funeral. Here, Stacy revealed that she had "never stopped loving" House.

=== Michael Tritter ===
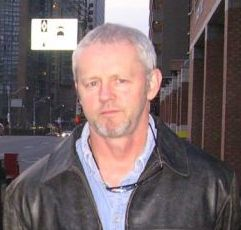
David Morse

Detective Michael Tritter (David Morse) is one of House's clinic patients. After House refuses to run tests at Tritter's request and insults him, Tritter trips House. House agrees to the tests and tells Tritter he has to check his temperature to rule out infection. House proceeds to use a rectal thermometer, and his supposed reason for using the rectal thermometer over a normal mouth thermometer is Tritter's chewing of nicotine gum, since oral readings can be affected by food and drink. House then leaves the room on a pretense with the thermometer still inserted in Tritter's rectum; House intentionally never returns and Tritter endures the rectal thermometer for two hours.

Afterwards, Tritter demands an apology from House for deliberately leaving the thermometer in him. House refuses, apparently spurred on by the patient's attitude, which is as bad as House's. Caught speeding and arrested for possession of allegedly unprescribed medication, House is thrown in jail overnight by Tritter, who searches his house the next week and finds a large amount of Vicodin. He also interviews House's staff looking for inconsistencies in their stories. He proceeds to tighten his vise grip on Wilson by freezing Wilson's bank account, towing his car, and revoking his drug prescription rights because he wants Wilson to testify against House in court.

After Tritter discovers that Wilson refuses to betray House, he moves on to House's assistants, freezing Foreman and Cameron's accounts, before talking to each one of them in turn. Foreman and Cameron refuse to testify in court about House, but when Tritter talks to Chase, he makes it appear to the hospital staff as though they had had a pleasant lunch together. Chase is concerned that this makes Foreman and Cameron think that Chase has told Tritter something, although he had refused to, his only stated reason being that he would lose his job.

Tritter finally succeeds in his goal when Wilson comes to him, requesting "thirty pieces of silver" in a symbolic statement of his decision to betray House, whom he has come to see as spiraling out of control. In the final days leading up to House's trial, House enters rehab. Tritter confronts him in rehab to see if he was really going through with it. When the charges against House were dropped at the trial, because Cuddy fabricated evidence that acquitted House, Tritter wished House good luck and said that he hoped he was wrong about him. Tritter did not appear on the show again.

=== Amber Volakis ===
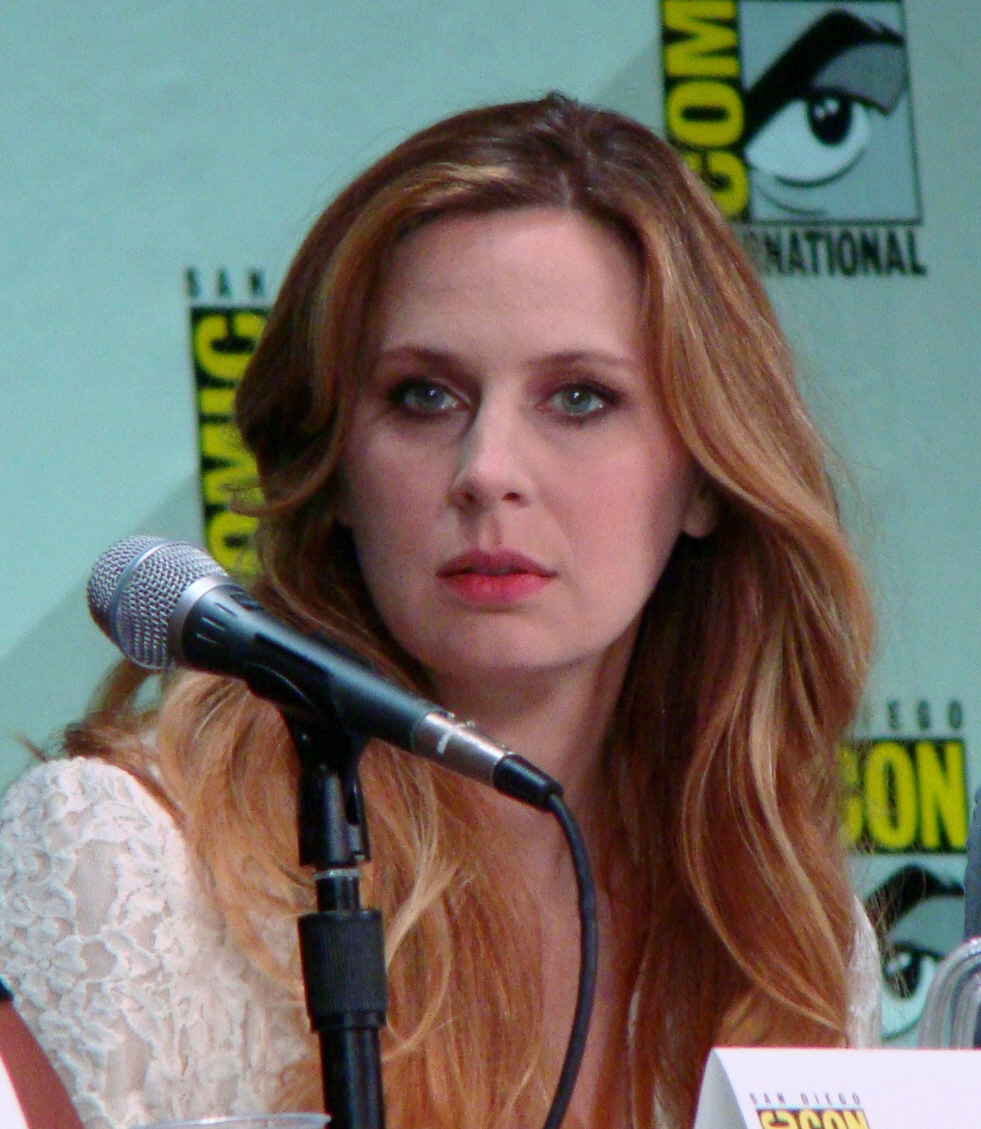
Anne Dudek in 2011

Dr. Amber Volakis (Anne Dudek) is an interventional radiologist featured in the fourth and fifth seasons as House's main antagonist. In House's competition to hire a new team, she is #24. Volakis is willing to do anything to get the job, including acts of dishonesty. This is first seen when she apparently quits the competition and convinces a group of applicants to imitate her, rather than be humiliated by House; she returns moments later admitting it was a ruse to thin the herd. She is subsequently referred to as "Cutthroat Bitch" and "Bitch" by House throughout the season, and is even referred to as such on House's caller I.D. After the characters stop using this nickname, she is still almost always called by her first name, unlike the rest of the characters. She sometimes coerces Chase and Cameron, now reassigned to different departments of the hospital, into helping her. Her persistence and unorthodox approaches initially win her praise, but she is ultimately eliminated because House feels she cannot accept being wrong, something he says she would need to be able to accept on a regular basis if she were to work for him.

Amber returns in "Frozen", when House discovers that she is Wilson's new girlfriend, a fact Wilson had been trying to conceal from House. House and Amber quickly develop an adversarial relationship, bickering over "shared custody" of Wilson. In the two-part season 4 finale (episodes "House's Head" and "Wilson's Heart"), Amber is involved in a bus crash alongside House, who noticed symptoms of an unknown disease in her immediately before the crash. House later realizes that she is suffering from poisoning from her use of flu pills containing amantadine, along with the kidney failure caused by the crash. She dies in Wilson's arms due to multiple organ failure. Amber is absent from only two episodes in the fourth season.

Amber re-appears as House's hallucinated helper at the end of the episode "Saviors," and in the succeeding episode "House Divided," where House continues to see her. She is revealed to have become a part of his unconscious, now risen from his insomnia and his guilt over failing to foresee Kutner's suicide and over her death earlier. House first seeks to shut out his hallucinated friend with sleeping pills, but later engages proactively with her to figure out a case. A misdiagnosis is almost fatal to the patient; as is Chase's case of anaphylactic shock at the bachelor party House throws for him, when Chase licks a stripper unknowingly covered in strawberry flavored body butter, to which he is allergic. House imagines "Amber" may have been trying to murder Chase, he takes the sleeping pill at the end of the episode, but he finds he is still seeing her, and in the next episode "Under My Skin" it appears his hallucinations are due to his use of Vicodin and he must detox. In the season finale, after it is exposed that House hallucinated his detoxification, Amber re-appears.

Amber made her final appearance, her first in three seasons, in the series finale "Everybody Dies", as a hallucination of House and not able to participate in the team.

Critic Kelly Woo, from TV Squad, placed her on #3 on her list of "Seven new characters that worked" just below Lost's Benjamin Linus and Desmond Hume.

=== Lucas Douglas ===
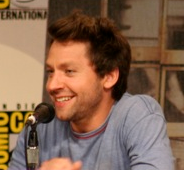
Michael Weston

Lucas Douglas (Michael Weston) is a private investigator. He is hired by House in the fifth-season episode "Not Cancer" to spy on House's team and gain information about them. Among other things, he finds out about a secret bank account started up by Taub's wife of which Taub is unaware. Impressed by his thorough efforts, House decides to put Lucas "on retainer."

Next, in "Adverse Events", House uses Lucas to gain information about Cuddy's personal life. Lucas, though, had also begun to take a romantic interest in Cuddy. In "Lucky Thirteen", House uses him to spy on Wilson because he suspects he was lying about where he was one morning. Lucas finds out that he's dating a hooker and that he's doing drugs. House then figures out Wilson was trying to throw him off because he knew Lucas was following him. It is also revealed that Lucas got the keys to all of his fellows' houses. House also used him to dig up info about Foreman, but could not find anything interesting.

Michael Weston reprises the role of Lucas during season six in the episode "Known Unknowns". Lucas had begun dating Cuddy. In the season 6 finale, Cuddy breaks off her engagement with him and ends their relationship so that she can be with House.

=== Rachel Taub ===
Rachel Taub (Jennifer Crystal Foley) is Chris Taub's wife and has appeared in several episodes, mostly dealing with her husband's infidelity. She reveals to Chris that she is pregnant in the seventh season. In season eight, she wants to move across country with her new boyfriend and her and Taub's daughter, but Taub tries to stop them.

=== Sam Carr ===
Sam Carr (Cynthia Watros) is Wilson's first wife, whom he starts dating again in season six. They break up in season seven.

=== Dominika Petrova ===
Dominika Petrova (Karolina Wydra) and House get married so that she can be allowed to live in the U.S. Dominika first appeared in the season 7 episode "Fall from Grace", where in an effort to make Lisa Cuddy jealous, House announces that he will be marrying Dominika, in order for her to get her green card. Their marriage ceremony takes place in House's apartment, with James Wilson and Lisa Cuddy as witnesses. Although this ceremony causes Cuddy to break down, their ceremony is a success, prompting Dominika to reveal to House that she actually does like him, to which House replies that he doesn't sleep with married women.

Dominika is not seen for almost a season; however, she returns in season 8's "Man of the House", due to her upcoming marriage status interview. In order to successfully appear to be a married couple, House and Dominika spend more time together, learning information about each other's lives. Although they are successful, a slip-up involving Wilson results in their getting caught. However, they make a deal resulting in Dominika being legally obligated to live in House's apartment.

For the next four episodes, House and Dominika grow close and it appears that both of them share some level of romantic affection for one another. Dominika aids House in his efforts to find out more information about his favorite prostitute in "We Need the Eggs" and their relationship only grows stronger, leading House to throw away the letter informing her that she has been approved for U.S. citizenship. In the following episode, "Body & Soul", before Dominika discovers House's deception, she seduces House, revealing the magnitude of her feelings for him. After she learns of his deception, she leaves him, in tears.

Dominika makes her final appearances in the series finale, "Everybody Dies". Here, a hallucination of House reveals his desires regarding love. It is revealed through House's subconscious that it was his desire to enter a true romantic relationship with Dominika, although House never reveals his true feelings to her. She is last seen at House's funeral, delivering a eulogy.

=== Unsuccessful applicants for fellowship ===
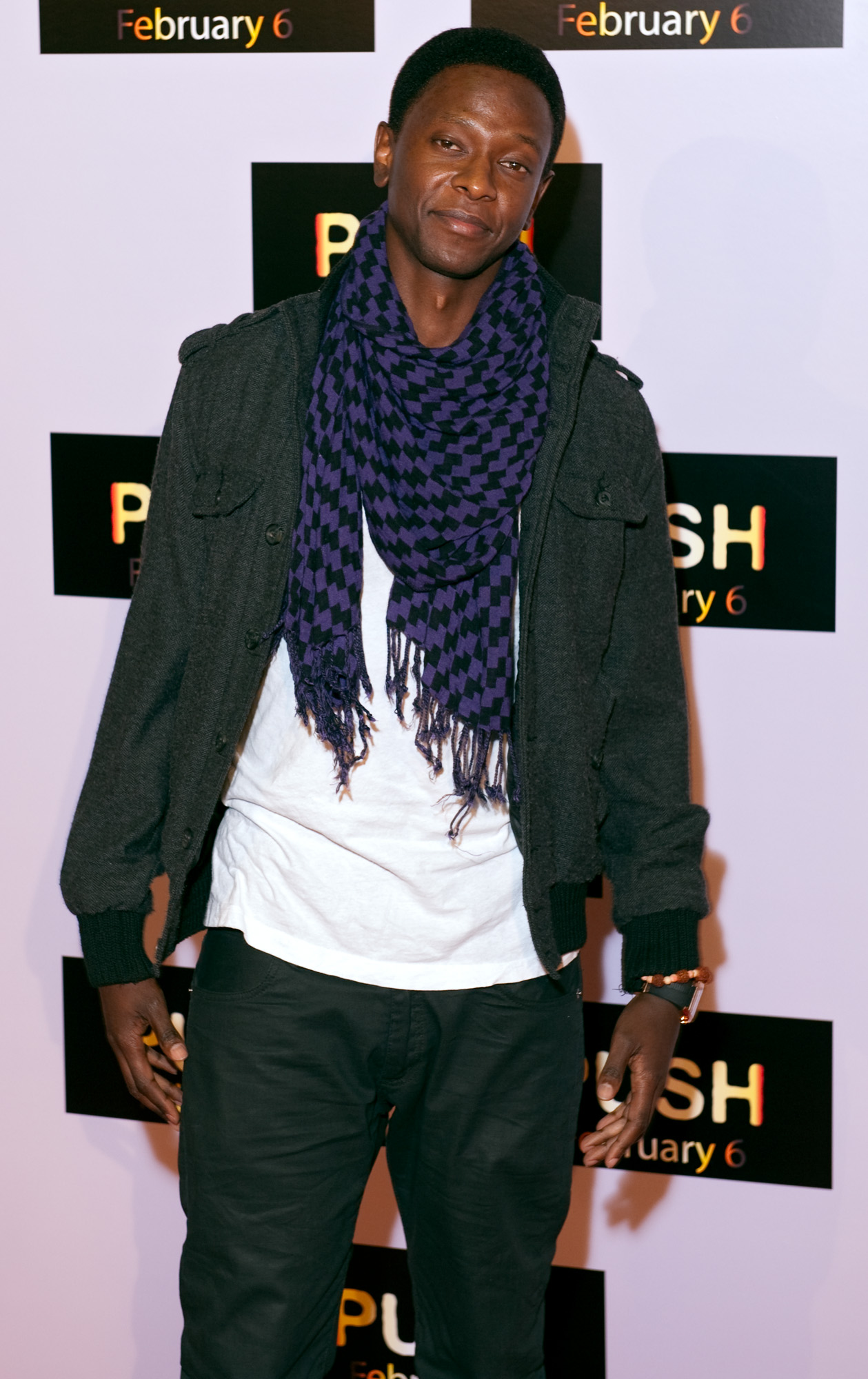
Edi Gathegi

- Dr. Jeffrey Cole (a.k.a. Big Love, Black Mormon) (Edi Gathegi) is #18. A graduate of Brigham Young University, Cole is a practicing Mormon which draws the ire of Dr. House, who is atheist. Cole eventually punches House when House calls Joseph Smith a "horny fraud." This impresses House. Dr. Cole is also African-American, and a surrogate for House's racial epithets towards Dr. Foreman. Cole refused to drop out of the running when Amber deceitfully encouraged candidates to quit rather than be humiliated by Dr. House. Cameron believes Cole is a decent and principled man, and gives him advice on how to gain House's respect. In the episode "Guardian Angels" it is revealed that he is a single father, and does not know where his child's mother is. In the episode "You Don't Want To Know", Kutner mentions that he has babysat for Cole's son. He is nicknamed "Big Love" in reference to HBO's popular series about Utah polygamists. House fires him because he was willing to compromise with Cuddy instead of subverting her authority. His medical specialty is Medical Genetics.
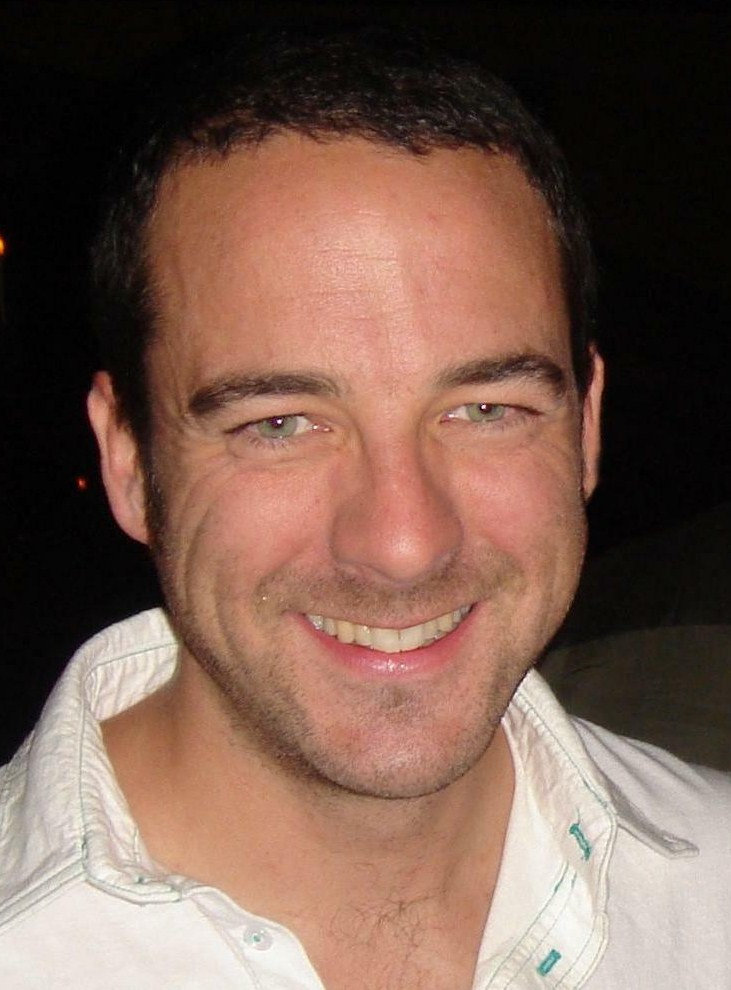
  Andy Comeau
- Dr. Travis Brennan (a.k.a. Grumpy) (Andy Comeau) is an epidemiologist. He is #37. Brennan was invited back for the second round of cuts, and survived again when the females' team was eliminated for failing to properly supervise the patient, resulting in his death. He offered the final (though incorrect) diagnosis of eosinophilic pneumonia of this patient, and House authorized treatment. House nicknames him "Grumpy", and he tends to be gruff and straight to the point. It is revealed he worked with Doctors Without Borders for eight years, making his experience in third world countries provide him more awareness of exotic pathologies. He interviewed for this job to settle down to a life in New Jersey with his fiancée, though from his own testimony and the mirroring of a patient he would rather be back working in third world countries. He was forced to quit in the episode "Whatever It Takes" after House discovered that he was poisoning a patient in order to provoke studies into cures for polio. When House confronted him with this, he told Brennan he had no intention of firing him, but ordered him to quit instead. House gave him a few moments to leave and then had Foreman call the police.
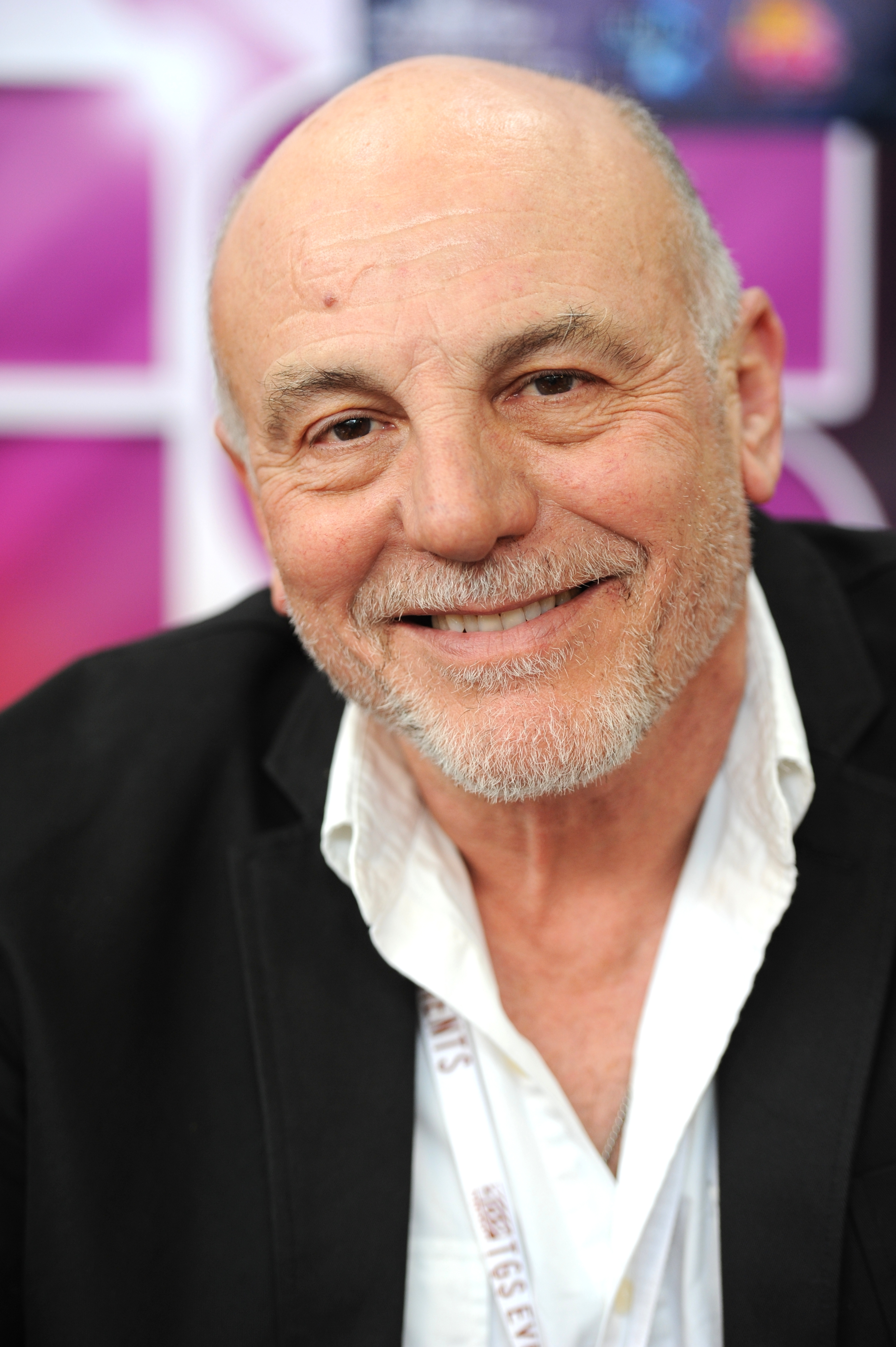
  Carmen Argenziano
- Henry Dobson (a.k.a. Scooter/Ridiculously Old Fraud/Bosley) (Carmen Argenziano) was a former Medical School Admissions Officer. He is #26. Dobson refuses to perform even basic tests on patients, saying that, with his advanced age and the other applicants' inexperience, they have more to prove; however, he shows a very gifted medical mind. House pulls Dobson aside and reveals the truth: Dobson is not even a doctor, and never even graduated from medical school or learned to do medical procedures. Dobson admits that during the 30 years that he worked in the admissions office of Columbia University's medical school, he audited every one of its classes. House, impressed by his gall as well as his knowledge, allows him to stay on to compete for a job as an "assistant". Dobson argues age should not matter (jokingly claiming he is 21) and demonstrates he is as effective as any of the real doctors by finding a way to break into a patient's home to acquire key information and offering a diagnosis of cancer for a patient that House agreed with and scheduled surgery for. However, in "97 Seconds", House does reveal to the remaining team members that one of the remaining "applicants" is not even really a doctor, although they have yet to realize who this is. Ultimately he is dismissed when House finds that Dobson's thought processes are too similar to his own, illustrated when Dobson explains that "you don't need someone to tell you what you're already thinking" before House can explain the dismissal. Nicknamed "Scooter", "Ridiculously Old Fraud", and "Bosley", after the Charlie's Angels character in an episode where House was pretending to be Charlie and the other applicants the Angels.

== Minor characters ==
=== Family members ===
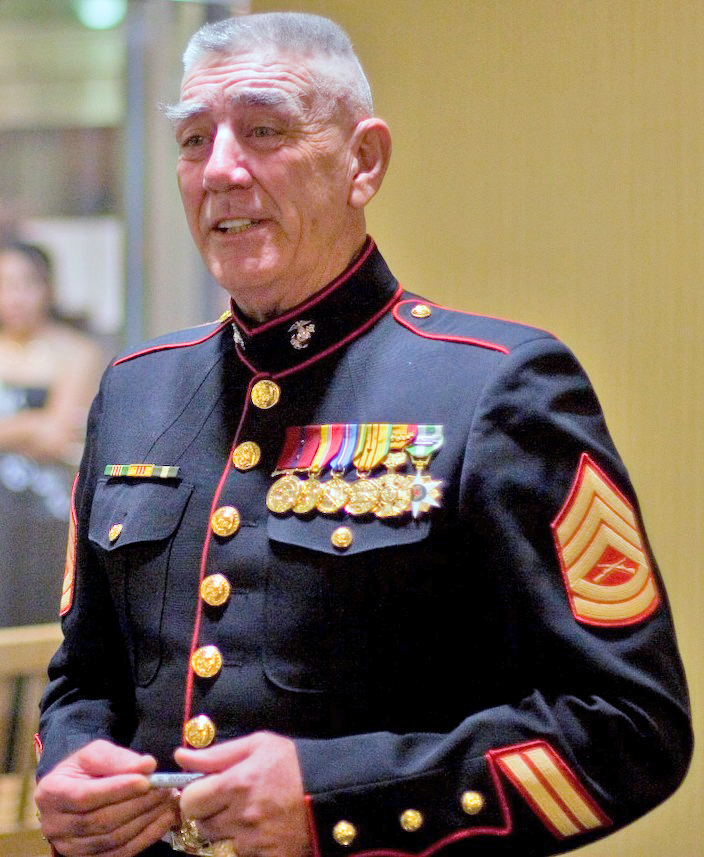
R. Lee Ermey

- John and Blythe House (R. Lee Ermey and Diane Baker) are House's parents. House's mother is notably the only person aside from Wilson, Cuddy and Stacy towards whom he appears to show genuine affection, and although it's implied that he does not keep in regular contact with his parents, he has been seen to phone his mother on Christmas. In episode 2.05 ("Daddy's Boy"), mother Blythe seems to be the standard military housewife, and House calls her a "human polygraph". The character's first name may be a reference to actress Blythe Danner, who played a similar character in The Great Santini. His father John is a retired Marine Corps aviator and is incessantly honest, a trait which House seems to be quite bitter about. According to House, his father is also obsessively punctual, to the point that if he was so much as "two minutes late for dinner, he didn't eat". House's father is hard on him for not dealing with his leg better, telling him "your problem is that you don't know how lucky you are." House's father was stationed in Egypt when House was young, and in Japan when House was a teenager. In episode twelve of season three ("One Day, One Room"), House reveals that his father abused him, making him sleep on the lawn and take ice baths. In episode 5.04, "Birthmarks", John House dies, and House reveals that he does not believe John was his biological father. At the funeral, House delivers a eulogy at his mother's request and he cannot restrain himself from pointing out his father's lack of compassion by referring to the fact that no officers of inferior rank (John House was a Colonel) attended his funeral, only superiors, meaning that he never inspired any respect in his subordinates. House removes skin from John's ear for DNA testing, which confirms his suspicion and seems in part to validate his disdain for his father. Despite the revelation, John's death seems to have moved House; later in the episode in a rare moment of vulnerability, House says to Wilson, "My dad's dead," as though the significance of the event were just sinking in. In "Brave Heart" House attempts to talk to his dead father after Wilson tells him to try it, despite having previously dismissed the idea as stupid. In the episode "Perils of Paranoia" it is revealed that House keeps his father's mameluke dress sword and presentation M1911 pistol in a closet at his apartment.
- Dr. Rowan Chase (Patrick Bauchau) is Dr. Robert Chase's estranged Czech-Australian father and an acclaimed rheumatologist. He left his alcoholic wife and teenage son, and some unspecified time later, remarried. He is seen in one episode, 1.13 ("Cursed"). In episode 2.08 ("The Mistake"), the character was revealed to have died of lung cancer, without ever saying goodbye to his son, and in 2.22 ("Forever"), House concludes from the fact that Robert Chase worked at the neonatal department during his vacation to earn some extra money that he was left out of his father's will. Chase confirms this in later episodes.
- Rodney Foreman (Charles S. Dutton) is Dr. Eric Foreman's religious father. He appears in "Euphoria, Part 2" and "House Training".
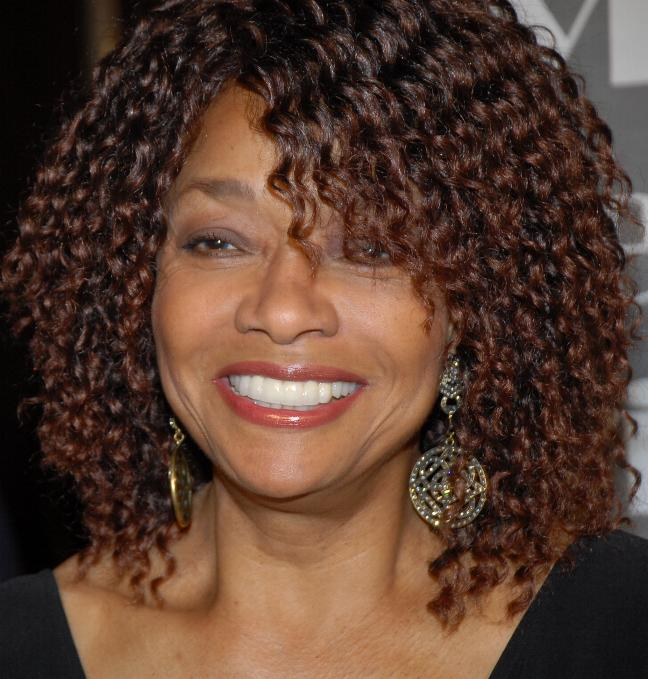
  Beverly Todd
- Alicia Foreman (Beverly Todd) is Dr. Foreman's mother, who has Alzheimer's disease. She appears in "House Training". In "Moving the Chains", it is revealed that she has died.
- Marcus Foreman (Orlando Jones) is Dr. Foreman's estranged older brother, who has led a life of petty crime. He is released from prison in "Moving the Chains", whereupon House immediately gives him a job as his assistant. Eric is infuriated by this move, for although Marcus claims to have changed, Eric has not forgiven his brother for his previous life. Marcus informs House of Mrs. Foreman's death and quits after House reveals this knowledge to Eric. However, the brothers' relationship seems to be somewhat repaired, as Eric offers to help Marcus in finding a new job and invites him to share his home.
- Rachel Cuddy (Kayla and Rylie Colbert) is Lisa Cuddy's adopted daughter.
- Arlene Cuddy (Candice Bergen) is Lisa Cuddy's mother. She appears in the episode "Family Practice".
- Julia Cuddy (Paula Marshall) is Lisa Cuddy's sister.

=== Hospital workers and patients ===
- Hospital Pharmacist (Marco Pelaez) is the hospital pharmacist seen in several early episodes. He was first seen in the episode "Occam's Razor" and was last seen in the episode "One Day, One Room".
- Nurse Brenda Previn (Stephanie Venditto) is the Head Nurse seen in many earlier episodes. She was often snarky toward House and his team. She was first seen in the episode "Kids" and was last seen in the episode "Que Sera Sera".

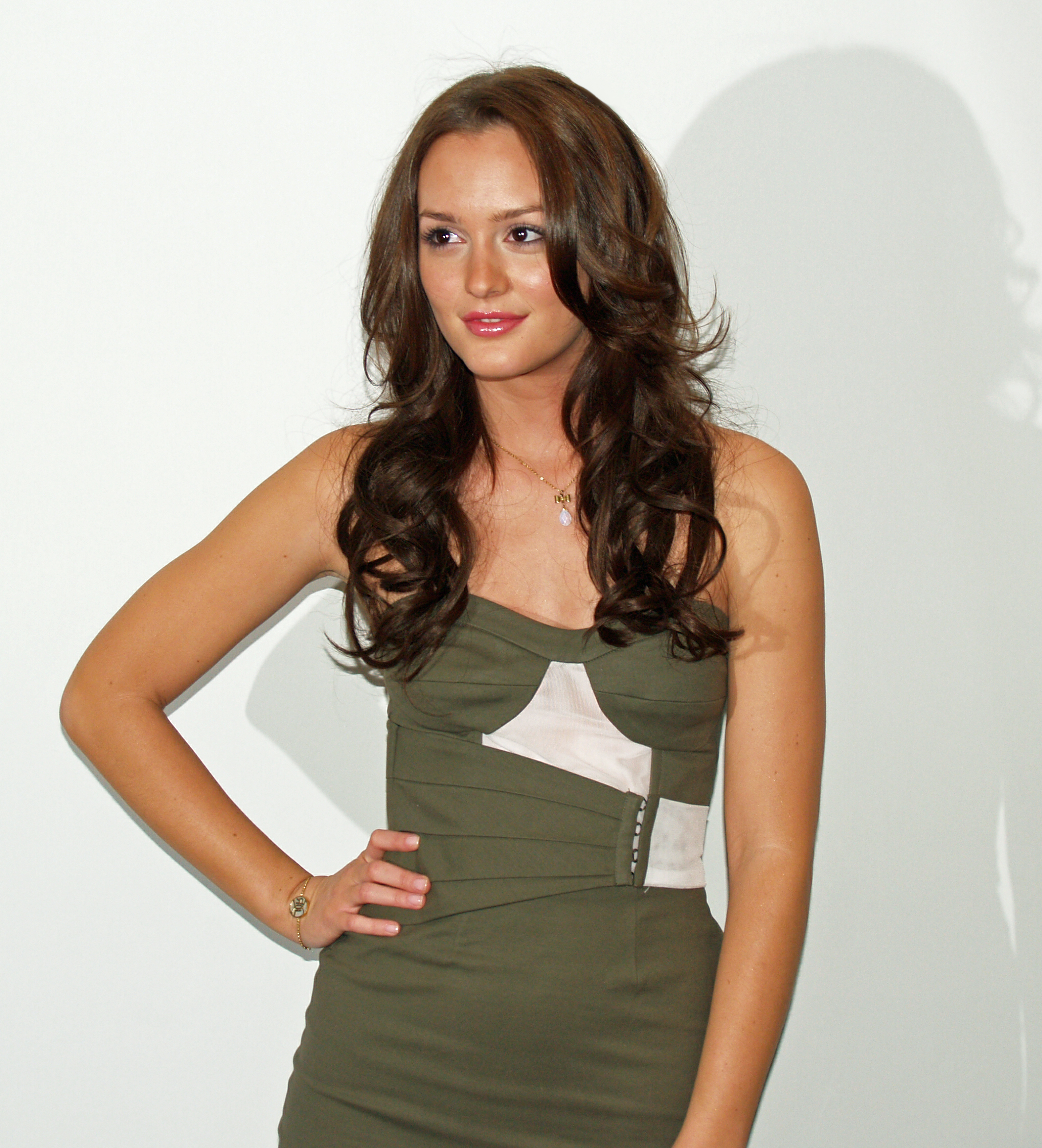
Leighton Meester

- Ali (Leighton Meester) is House's "teenage stalker", a seventeen-year-old whose father was treated by House for a cold during "Informed Consent". She then became obsessed with him, going as far as stalking him during work, and encouraging the two of them to have sex. House recognized her behavior as a symptom and had her treated. The theme would be repeated between Meester and Hugh Laurie (Dr. House) in the 2011 film The Oranges, when Laurie's character enters into an affair with Meester's character, the 20-something daughter of his best friend.
- Steve McQueen (named after the Hollywood actor Steve McQueen) is House's pet rat, which he captured in Stacy's attic in episode 2.07 ("Hunting"). Originally supposed to be exterminating the rat, House granted him reprieve in order to diagnose his odd neck tilt. By the end of the episode House had determined the cause to be mycoplasmosis, aggravated by Stacy's smoking. House has used Steve McQueen for medical experimentation. In Episode 2.21 "Euphoria, Part 2", House uses Steve to do a walk through of the Cop's home and stated that if Steve begins showing symptoms, as House saw it on his webcam, that there was a '"good chance" that he would be hit with a "cane-shaped object", and subsequently dissected. Steve never showed symptoms, however, so House did not end up killing him. Since then, he has been seen in the background in House's apartment during various episodes. It was revealed on the official House website that Steve has since died.
- Dr. Darryl Nolan (Andre Braugher) is a therapist who works at Mayfield Psychiatric Hospital. He was assigned as House's doctor through his recovery process. In "Broken", it is up to him to write the letter to the medical board to get House his license back. House threatens Nolan with civil disobedience, but Nolan found ways to get around House's nonsense. After "Freedom Master" leaps off of a parking garage due to House trying to prove Nolan wrong (he somehow survives but is seriously injured), House changes his ways and begins complying with his treatments. Nolan begins giving House therapy sessions and helps him on the road to recovery. House opens up to Nolan, who teaches him to be able to trust others and get close to somebody. When Nolan's father is dying, he calls House as a second consult, showing his trust in him. House also believes that Nolan has immersed himself so much in his work he has no friends and family and House is the closest he has to a friend. Although House is initially mean to him after confirming Nolan's father is fatally ill, House stays with him as his father dies giving Nolan some comfort which he later thanks House for. After House shows he has connected with Lydia, he agrees to write the letter to get House's job back. He returns in "Epic Fail". In a therapy session with House, he convinces him to try a new hobby with Wilson. After House is still getting pain in his leg despite his new cooking hobby, he recommends he returns to diagnostic medicine, because helping solve a case temporarily relieved his pain.
  In "Baggage", House quits therapy, saying that he took Dr. Nolan's advice for a year, and yet he still feels miserable. He blames Nolan for his loneliness and accuses him of being nothing more than a faith healer.
- Juan "Alvie" Alvarez (Lin-Manuel Miranda) is a psychiatric patient who is House's roommate at rehab in "Broken". Alvie has bipolar disorder, but refuses to take his medication. He has manic episodes and wants to be a rapper. He supports House not taking his medication either. House stood by Alvie throughout his time in rehab, and enjoyed his company (though House never admitted it directly). In "Baggage", House moves out of Wilson's condo to discover that Alvie has been living in his old apartment and selling his belongings in order to buy paint for the walls, which he thought needed to be brighter. Alvie, who had no identification papers, was hiding from U.S. Citizenship and Immigration Services, which suspected he was an illegal immigrant, despite the fact he's Puerto Rican and thus a U.S. citizen. House helped by claiming to be his doctor and producing a "DNA test" that proved Alvie was related to his mother, who had proper documentation.
- Nurse Regina (Tracy Vilar) is a nurse in the hospital's free clinic. Dr. Cuddy and nurse Regina have a rapport and the latter often mocks Cuddy about her interactions with House and the stresses that come with Cuddy's job.
- Doctor Cheng (Keiko Agena) is a pediatrician who appears in the season seven episode, "Unplanned Parenthood". Impressed by her abilities, Taub attempts to have her hired as Thirteen's replacement. She also impresses House by helping him with Rachel using her pediatric skills, and he gives Taub the go ahead to hire her. However, worried that House is messing around with him, Taub delays hiring her, leading her to turn down the offer because his lack of backbone makes him look childish, and she hates working with children.

== Notable guest stars ==
- Robin Tunney — Rebecca Adler (episode 1x01)
- Elizabeth Mitchell — sister Mary Augustine (episode 1x05)
- Dominic Purcell — Ed Snow (episode 1x07)
- Kurt Fuller — Mark Adams (episode 1x08)
- Harry Lennix — John Henry Gilles (episode 1x09)
- Brandy Norwood — cameo (episode 1x09)
- Amanda Seyfried — Pam (episode 1х11)
- Scott Foley – Hank Wiggen (episode 1x12)
- Nestor Carbonell – Jeffrey Reilich (episode 1x13)
- Carmen Electra — cameo (episode 1х21)
- LL Cool J – Clarence (episode 2x01)
- Ron Livingston – Dr. Sebastian Charles (episode 2x04)
- Ryan Hurst — Sam McGinley (episode 2x08)
- Cynthia Nixon - Anica Jovanovich (episode 2x09)
- Michael O'Keefe – Fletcher Stone (episode 2x10)
- Christopher Cousins – Doug (episode 2x12)
- Michelle Trachtenberg – Melinda Bardach (episode 2x16)
- MacKenzie Astin — Alan Alston (episode 2х17)
- Elias Koteas — Jack Moriarty (episode 2х24)
- Joel Grey — Ezra Powell (episode 3х03)
- Alan Rosenberg — Bruce Steinerman (episode 3х08)
- Tory Kittles — Derek Hoyt (episode 3х11)
- Katheryn Winnick — Eve (episode 3х12)
- Kurtwood Smith — Dr. Obyedkov (episode 3х15)
- Tyson Ritter — cameo (episode 3х17)
- Piper Perabo — Honey (episode 3х22)
- Jeremy Renner - Jimmy Quidd (episode 4x09)
- Fred Durst — barman (episode 4х16)
- Felicia Day - Apple (episode 5x02)
- Zeljko Ivanek – Jason (episode 5x09)
- Wood Harris – Lt. Bowman (episode 5x09)
- Evan Peters – Oliver (episode 5x09)
- Evan Jones – Bill (episode 5x09)
- Jay Karnes — Nick Greenwald (episode 5х17)
- Mos Def — Lee (episode 5х19)
- Meat Loaf — Eddie (episode 5х20)
- Franka Potente — Lydia Bohm (episodes 6x01 and 6x02)
- Lin-Manuel Miranda - Juan Alvarez (episodes 6x01, 6x02 and 6x21)
- Jon Seda – Donny (episode 6x05)
- Marcus Giamatti – Jeffrey Keener (episode 6x06)
- Joshua Malina – Tucker (episode 6x09)
- Ethan Embry – Mickey (episode 6x10)
- Nick Chinlund – Eddie (episode 6x10)
- Ray Abruzzo – Lorenzo Whibberly (episode 6x12)
- Adam Rothenberg – Taylor (episode 6x14)
- Dennis Boutsikaris – Arthie (episode 6x15)
- David Strathairn – Nash (episode 6x16)
- Sarah Wayne Callies – Julia (episode 6x18)
- Zoe McLellan — Sidney Merrick (episode 6x20)
- Matthew Lillard — Jack (episodes 7x09)
- Sprague Grayden — Daisy (episodes 7x09)
- David Costabile — Phil (episode 7x20)
- Amy Landecker — Darrien McCurdy (episode 7x22)
- Thom Barry — Dr. Sykes (episode 8x01)
- Michael Massee — Frankie (episode 8x01)
- Jude Ciccolella — Mendelson (episode 8x01)
- Wentworth Miller — Benjamyn Bird (episode 8x03)
- Michael Nouri — Thad Burton (episode 8x04)
- Jeffrey Wright — Dr. Walter Cofield (episode 8x11)
- Jake Weber — Joe Reese (episode 8x13)
- José Zúñiga — Nate Weimann (episode 8x13)
- Michael B. Jordan - (episode 8x14)
- Patrick Stump — Micah (episode 8х17)
