= Wilson's Heart (House) =

- House episode
- Episode no.: Season 4 Episode 16
- Directed by: Katie Jacobs
- Written by: Peter Blake; David Foster; Russel Friend; Garrett Lerner
- Original air date: May 19, 2008

Guest appearances
- Anne Dudek as Dr. Amber Volakis; Dan Desmond as Dr. Richmond; Jennifer Crystal Foley as Rachel Taub; Fred Durst as the bartender

Episode chronology
← Previous "House's Head"	Next → "Dying Changes Everything"
- House season 4

"Wilson's Heart" is the sixteenth episode and season finale of the fourth season of House and the eighty-sixth episode overall. It aired on May 19, 2008, on Fox. It is the second and final part of the two-part fourth season finale, the first part being "House's Head".

== Plot ==
House remains affected by memory loss due to a bus crash that has also severely injured Amber Volakis, Wilson's girlfriend. Amber is being treated at Princeton General Hospital, where the attending physician says she is experiencing tachycardia that can't be explained as a result of the bus crash. House and Wilson have her moved to Princeton-Plainsboro Hospital. In the ambulance, Amber's tachycardia degenerates into v-fib; Wilson demands she be put into protective hypothermia in order to buy time for a proper diagnosis. After further testing, Amber develops multisystem organ failure, including liver and neurological damage.

At Wilson's urging, House agrees to undergo deep brain stimulation to recover his memories of the evening of the bus crash and thereby help diagnose Amber. During the stimulation, House remembers that he was at a bar, too drunk to drive home, and called Wilson for a ride, but Amber came instead. When she wouldn't drink with him, House stormed off and boarded a bus; Amber followed to give him his cane.

During the bus ride, Amber complained that she had the flu, and took a heavy dose of amantadine. The crash caused acute kidney injury, making her kidneys unable to adequately filter out the amantadine, which caused all of her unexplained symptoms. House goes into a seizure while still connected to the deep brain stimulation equipment, and falls into a coma.

The team confirms House's diagnosis of Amber, but her organs are so damaged that she does not qualify for a transplant, so there is nothing they can do to treat her. Wilson weans Amber off anesthesia in order to spend her last moments alive with him. The team comes in one by one to say goodbye to Amber, and after Wilson himself says goodbye, he shuts off Amber's bypass and she dies peacefully in Wilson's arms. Unconscious, House has a vision of Amber, who persuades him not to give up on life and die, telling him, "You can't always get what you want."

Back at the hospital, Thirteen discovers she has inherited Huntington's disease, and House awakens with Cuddy at his side. Taub crawls into bed with his wife, Kutner watches TV alone, and Chase and Cameron meet Foreman in a restaurant. Wilson visits House, but the two just silently stare at each other. Wilson returns home and finds a note Amber left him in their bedroom saying she went to pick up House, and he breaks down in tears.

== Reception ==
The episode increased ratings from the previous week, with 16.358 million viewers tuning in.

== Soundtrack ==
An acoustic version of Massive Attack's "Teardrop," the show's opening theme, can be heard in the middle of the episode in a short montage, by José González.

The song "Re:Stacks" by Bon Iver is used during Amber and Wilson's final moments together.

The song that plays near the end of the episode when House and Amber are on the bus is "Light for the Deadvine" by People in Planes.

The song that plays as House exits the bus until the end of the episode is "Passing Afternoon" by Iron and Wine.
