= People in Planes =

Welsh musical group from 1998 to 2013

- Origin: Porthcawl, Wales
- Genres: Alternative rock; progressive rock; indie rock
- Years active: 1998–2013
- Labels: Wind-up Records, EMI
- Members: Gareth Jones; Pete Roberts; Ian Russell; Kris Blight; John Maloney

People in Planes were a Welsh alternative rock band from Porthcawl, active from 1998 to 2013. They were signed to Wind-up Records. Prior to 2003, they were known as Tetra Splendour (during which time they moved to Cardiff), and before that, they went by the name of Robots in the Sky. Their final name was derived from the band's obsession with air travel, which is also present in their song titles and lyrics.

== History ==
=== Robots in the Sky: 1998–2000 ===
The band began as a four-piece under the name Robots in the Sky. They received assistance under the Community Music Wales scheme (the same organization behind Complete Control Music and the annual Compass Point Festival in Cardiff), and in 2000 they released their début, a red 7" vinyl with two tracks - "E.T.A." and "Muriel's Motorhome". Only 500 copies of the record were made (incidentally, it was also the first ever release on the Complete Control Music label).

This attracted the attention of EMI/Chrysalis' brand new sub-label, Wishakismo, and the band were offered a deal. Fearing legal repercussions from other bands with similar names (most notably Robots in Disguise), the first name-change was implemented and Robots in the Sky became Tetra Splendour (the English translation of a Spanish jazz quartet, Quatro Esplendido).

=== Tetra Splendour: 2000–2005 ===
After signing to Wishakismo, the band headed into Cardiff's Audio Zone recording studio to commence recording of their début album, Splendid Animation. In their brief time as Tetra Splendour, the then-four-piece toured with bands such as Fun Lovin' Criminals, Biffy Clyro and Miss Black America (band), among others, and played the famous Reading Festival in 2002.

On 9 April 2001, the band released their first single as Tetra Splendour - "Mr. Bishi" (on CD and on 7" vinyl, of which only 500 copies were made). It was met with positive reviews (and was, incidentally, the first Wishakismo release). On 1 October 2001, the band released their second single, "De-Rail" (on CD and 7" white vinyl). As the release of the album neared, the band were promoted from Wishakismo to the main roster of EMI/Chrysalis. On this label they released their final single, "Pollenfever", on 25 February 2002—it would be the only Tetra Splendour release to be backed up by a video (which received limited airplay) and a dedicated headline tour.

On 20 May 2002, the band's début album, Splendid Animation, was released.

The album received mixed reviews from the rock press, and many disagreements arose—mainly over Radiohead comparisons and whether or not their "meandering jazzy nonsense" was a good thing. However, the general consensus was that the band had potential, and EMI/Chrysalis allowed them to return to the studio.

While recording new material, EMI was the subject of a management change, which led to the subsequent releases of many bands from their old contracts, including Tetra Splendour.

=== People in Planes and As Far as the Eye Can See: 2005–2008 ===
After being dropped by EMI, the band recorded a new album at Wales' Monnow Valley Studio, containing new songs (with newly hired keyboard player Ian Russell) and unreleased Tetra Splendour material.

In 2005, they released their first single under the name People in Planes, "Talking Heads" (another limited release, being made in a batch of 1,000). The single featured two unreleased Tetra Splendour tracks as B-sides (and being accompanied by a music video, which again received limited airplay). "Talking Heads", which has since been renamed to "If You Talk Too Much (My Head Will Explode)", a line from the song's chorus (a decision Wind-Up made to make the songs more recognizable on the radio), has since had a new video made, shot in an airport, that was directed by actor Joaquin Phoenix. It is also scheduled for re-release as a single.

At the 2005 South by Southwest festival in Austin, Texas, the band met Jeff Klein, with whom they would later tour in June 2005. Shortly after their South By Southwest appearance they were approached by Wind Up Records and in May, the band signed a deal with them.

Their debut album, As Far as the Eye Can See (which has been the speculative title from as early as 2003), was released on March 28, 2006. The single "If You Talk Too Much (My Head Will Explode)" reached #33 on the U.S. Billboard Modern Rock chart. The band toured the United States, opening for Blue October in 2006. The band also features on the soundtrack for the 2006 film John Tucker Must Die (and were also given a cameo in the film itself).

On 23 June 2008, at Trash in Brooklyn, New York, People In Planes mentioned that they had become residents of New York City and were working on getting the correct documentation to make it official. They announced the winner of their cover contest as well and played a rendition of Hall & Oates' song "Maneater".

=== Beyond the Horizon, "People in Planes 3" and break-up: 2008-2013 ===
People In Planes were in pre-production for their second album for Wind-Up records since they returned from the States in late 2006. They took a period off to rehearse new material and played a string of UK shows in late 2006 and early 2007 where they road-tested new material. New song titles include: "Baked", "Evil With You", "Get On The Flaw", "Human Error", "Better Than Life", "I Wish That You'd Fall Apart" and "Tonight (The Sun Will Rise)"

On 7 February 2008 People In Planes released "Pretty Buildings", the first song from Beyond the Horizon as an internet download through MySpace and the band's mailing list.

Hey people. I hereby declare People In Planes are back! Our new project was recorded with four different producers in six studios across Wales, England and America, and we've put our entire souls into it. It's been a long wait for all of us, and we're really excited to present this first track to you- "Pretty Buildings".

--Gareth, Peter, Kris, John and Ian

The band headed out to SXSW in March to showcase songs from the new album before joining Jupiter One on a co-headlining tour with The Toadies across the States between March and April. Guitarist Peter Roberts blogged from the road on the band's Myspace revealing that the first radio single is set to be M'aidez, M'aidez, due sometime before the end of the first run of shows.

On 26 March 2008, the first video from Beyond the Horizon, for the song "Pretty Buildings", was released online as a purevolume exclusive. The video was directed by Walter Robot. In addition, on this date the splash page of the band's website changed revealing Beyond the Horizon as the title of the album with a release date of 9 September 2008.

The song "pretty buildings" was featured in the Swedish-developed obstacle dodging flash game "Metro.Siberia – People in Planes edition" named after the band, which appeared on the front page of Newgrounds.com on April 17, 2008. This significantly contributed to the popularity of the song and the group.

The track "Last Man Standing" taken from the album Beyond the Horizon was featured on the Spike TV mini series UFC Primetime on January 31, 2009, documenting the buildup to UFC 94 Georges St-Pierre vs B.J. Penn The track was used in the closing scene of the last episode.

The band closed out 2008 with a U.S. tour opening for The Toadies.

On 2 June 2009, the Band released "Gung Ho For Info EP", a digital only release featuring the songs "Lay In The Road" and "Baked", which were previously unavailable in the US.

The band blogged on Myspace that their next US single would be "Know By Now", and that the band was working on new material, referred to as People In Planes 3. A radio edit single of "Know By Now" was released in the U.S., but no additional songs have been featured on the single. A Myspace update in late 2009, the band has recorded 8 new songs for the upcoming record.

They supported Biffy Clyro on their European tour during the fall of 2009. They mentioned upcoming new music on a Myspace blog from February 2010, and hinted fans might get an advance glimpse by signing up for their emailing list. Also, People In Planes 3 is either an EP, or an EP will precede their third full-length album. On small tours they've tested some new material. New song titles that have leaked are "For Your Eyes Only", "Sitting", "Right Behind You", "Fade Away", "Wreckage", "Avalanche", "Glorious", and "Silhouette". No official updates from the band since 2010 beside Peter's scattered comments about Susan Boyle.

In August 2011, Steve Osborne reported on his website that he is producing a forthcoming album by People In Planes. No tracks or title were mentioned.

In 2013, it was reported that the band had broken up.

== Band members ==
- Gareth Jones - lead vocals, rhythm guitar (1998–2013)
- Pete Roberts - lead guitar, backing vocals (1998–2013)
- Kris Blight - bass guitar (1998–2013)
- John Maloney - drums, percussion (1998–2013)
- Ian Russell - keyboards (2005–2013)

== Discography ==
=== Studio albums ===
- Splendid Animation (2002), [released under the band name Tetra Splendour]
- As Far as the Eye Can See (2006)
- Beyond the Horizon (2008)

=== Extended plays ===
- People in Planes EP (2005)
- Acoustic EP (2006)
- Gung Ho For Info EP (2009)

=== Other appearances ===
- Instantly Gratified on John Tucker Must Die (O.S.T.) (2006)

=== Singles ===
Title	Year	Peak chart positions			Album
Title	Year	UK	UK Indie	US Alt.	Album
"E.T.A" (Note: "E.T.A" was released under the name Robots in the Sky)	2000	—	—	—	Non-album single
"Mr. Bishi" (Note: "Mr. Bishi" was released under the name Tetra Splendour)	2001	—	—	—	Splendid Animation
"De-rail" (Note: "De-rail" was released under the name Tetra Splendour)	2001	—	—	—	Splendid Animation
"Pollenfever" (Note: "Pollenfever" was released under the name Tetra Splendour)	2002	—	—	—	Splendid Animation
"Talking Heads"	2005	100	32	—	Non-album single
"If You Talk Too Much (My Head Will Explode)"	2006	—	—	33	As Far As The Eye Can See
"Barracuda"	2006	—	—	—	As Far As The Eye Can See
"Falling by the Wayside"	2006	—	—	—	As Far As The Eye Can See
"Mayday (M'aidez)"	2008	—	—	—	Beyond the Horizon
"Pretty Buildings"	2008	—	—	—	Beyond the Horizon
"Last Man Standing"	2009	—	—	30	Beyond the Horizon
"Know By Now"	2009	—	—	—	Beyond the Horizon
"—" denotes a recording that did not chart or was not released.

== In popular culture ==
- "Falling by the Wayside" featured in an episode of The 4400 (series 3 episode 3 - Being Tom Baldwin)
- "Light for the Deadvine" is used in episode 4.16 of the Fox network show House, entitled "Wilson's Heart".
- "Last Man Standing" was featured in the final episode of the UFC Primetime special for Georges St-Pierre and B.J. Penn.
- "Last Man Standing" was featured in a promotional trailer for The Walking Dead season three.
- "Vampire" was featured in the surf movie A Fly in The Champagne about Kelly Slater and Andy Irons.
