= Known Unknowns =

- House episode
- Episode no.: Season 6 Episode 6
- Directed by: Greg Yaitanes
- Written by: Matthew V. Lewis & Doris Egan
- Original air date: November 9, 2009

Guest appearances
- Michael Weston as Lucas Douglas; Annabelle Attanasio as Jordan Retzinger; Marcus Giamatti as Jeffrey Keener; Bianca Collins as Phoebe; Eric Lutes as Derek Retzinger; Holly Gagnier as Michelle Berkley-Retzinger

Episode chronology
← Previous "Brave Heart"	Next → "Teamwork"
- House season 6

"Known Unknowns" is the seventh episode of the sixth season of House and 117th overall. It aired on Fox on November 9, 2009. The team tries to diagnose a teenage girl while House is away at a medical conference with Wilson and Cuddy. At the conference House finds something out about Cuddy.

== Plot ==
After a wild night out, a teenage girl named Jordan (Anna Attanasio) is brought to Princeton Plainsboro with severely swollen appendages. The team must work to diagnose Jordan, who is less than honest about what happened the night she fell ill. House suspects she is suffering from rhabdomyolysis and the fall caused crushed muscles which released toxins that caused swollen joints. But the CT shows no signs of trauma, so House goes in and gets Jordan to pretend to play the drums. Her hands are very weak. House notes that her chart shows low potassium, and rhabdo elevates potassium levels, meaning her potassium had to be extremely low the previous night. This means she can't have climbed stairs, meaning there was no fall. House says something else is causing her low potassium and rhabdo.

Meanwhile, Cuddy, Wilson, and House spend a weekend away from the hospital to attend a medical conference. During an 80s party at the convention, House and Cuddy are dancing and talk about their past at Michigan. They mention how they first met, and the night they slept together. House tells her that the next morning he was going to see her and see where things would go from there, but he got a call from the Dean of his first medical school and found out that he was expelled. After that he didn't see any point to go see her. She leaves him in a haste and later lets him know through Wilson that now she is a mom and she needs someone reliable. When House in turn offers Cuddy to babysit he finds out that she is dating the private investigator Lucas Douglas (Michael Weston) from season five, who is taking care of Cuddy's daughter in place of the babysitter.

Jordan's friend, Phoebe, tells Cameron and Chase what they did the previous night, stating they followed comic book creator Jeffrey Keener (Marcus Giamatti), including going to a restaurant in the building. The food makes Foreman suspect she could be bulimic, which would account for all her symptoms, so Cameron starts her on nutrition supplements and they do a barium swallow to check for mallory weiss tears. However the barium swallow shows no tears, ruling out bulimia. During this test, she has cardiac tamponade - she bleeds around her heart. The team puts her on antiarrythmics. House notes that since her blood pressure dropped during the barium swallow, it can't be a chronic condition. Foreman notes that this leaves just infections and toxins.

As Jordan's condition worsens, she becomes unable to distinguish fact from fiction. Foreman finds this is caused by a bleed in her brain that's affecting her thalamus causing her to lie. Phoebe tells Foreman that he's been told all the places they went. She says the only time they weren't together was when Jordan went to get ice. However, Phoebe only woke when Jordan returned, so the team has no idea what Jordan really did, or how long she was gone for. CCTV tapes show she was gone for only five minutes, and she returned from her trip holding Keener's journal. Cameron and Chase go to Keener's room and ask to search his room for toxins, but he insists she never arrived at his room. This causes Cameron to suspect that Jordan may have been drugged by roofies and raped by Keener. They start her on flumazenil to reduce the effect.

She soon starts to bleed behind her kidneys, so Foreman gives her blood transfusions. Cameron notices that this is similar to a toxic reaction, so they need to find out what toxin is causing it. Cameron suggests drugging her with amobarbital to suppress her thalamus. However, she continues to lie even on the amobarbital. She starts losing blood faster than the team can transfuse. An online search done by Cameron shows that Keener travels with his dog so they treat her for rickettsia.

At the medical conference, Wilson feels remorse after having performed euthanasia on a terminally ill cancer patient by intentionally having told the sequence to the patient's PCA machine to a coworker loud enough for the patient himself to hear, allowing the patient to administer himself a morphine overdose. Wilson plans to give a speech about the incident, although it may severely harm his career. However, House drugs Wilson and makes his speech during the convention in another person's name (instead of Gregory House or James Wilson, House goes by the name Phillip Perlmutter for the whole medical conference). While arguing about this, House has an epiphany about Jordan's condition.

It turns out that Jordan has vibrio vulnificus caused by the vibrio in the oysters Jordan had the previous night. She has hemochromatosis, which gave her a unique susceptibility to vibrio, which was what caused her swollen joints. However, this got attributed to bulimia so she got supplements that had iron in them. The iron stressed her liver, causing the bleeding. This led to more blood transfusions, giving her more blood, causing even more bleeding. The team starts Jordan on high-dose ceftazidime for the vibrio and chelate for the hemochromatosis. Jordan also admits that she never plucked up the courage to knock on Keener's door, so she left his notebook on his doormat. Keener never lied. Later, Wilson also admits that it was irrational to sacrifice his career because of his remorse and thanks House for being a good friend.

Towards the end of the episode, Chase confesses to Cameron that he killed Dibala. The episode ends as Cameron reacts in shock.

== Music ==
- The song playing in the background of the first scene is "Stadium Love" by Metric.
- "The Safety Dance" by Men Without Hats is the first song playing at the 80s party.
- House and Cuddy are dancing to "Time After Time" by Cyndi Lauper at the 80s party.
- "Fuel" by Metallica is played/viewed in a notebook computer, when House first meets the patient in an attempt to recreate the conditions of her disease's original symptoms.

== Reception ==
The episode was the most watched show on Fox TV that week with 13.31 million viewers.
