= Eva Amurri =

American actress (born 1985)

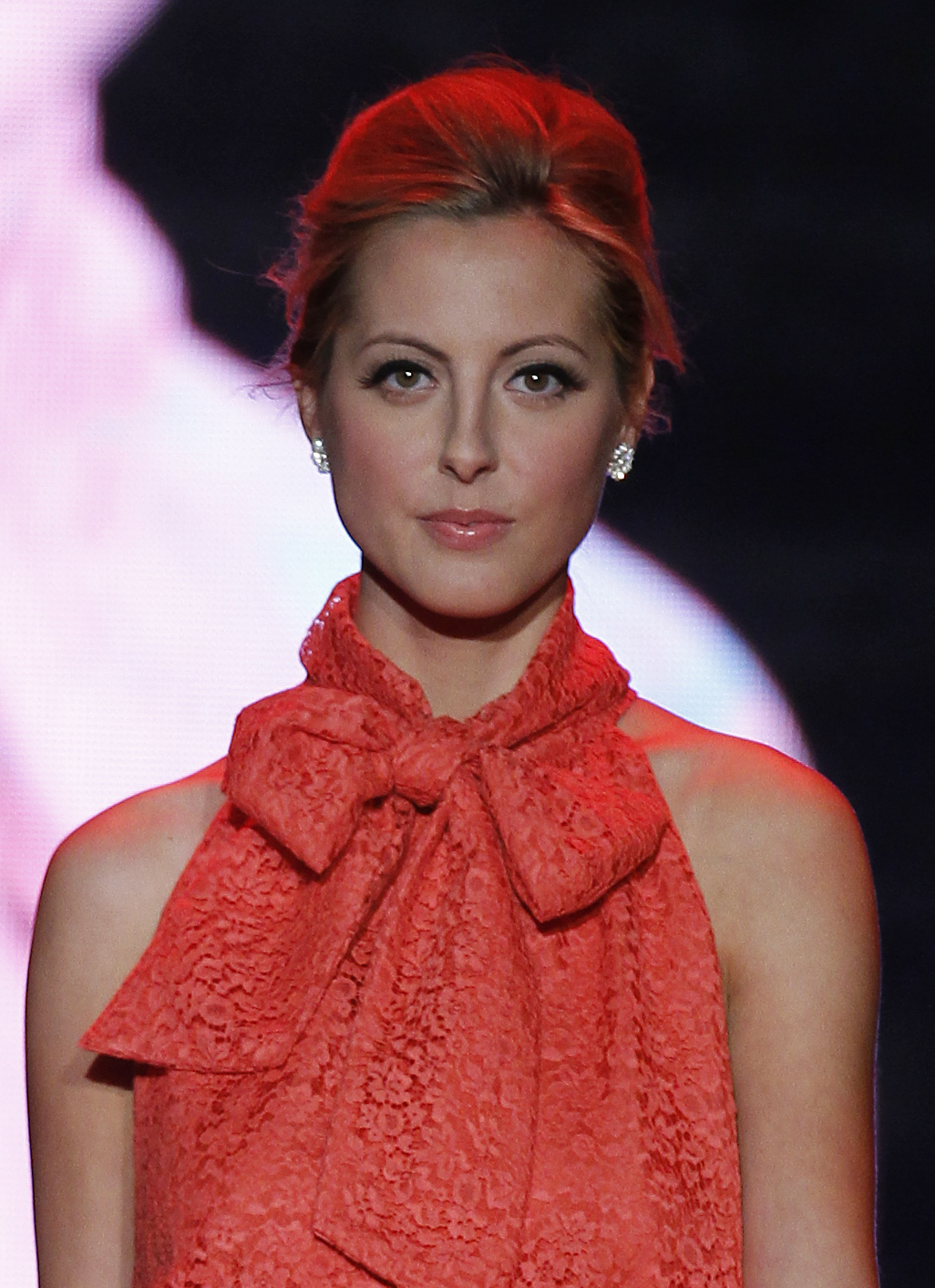
- Amurri in 2011
- Born: March 15, 1985 (age 41); New York City, U.S.
- Other name: Eva Amurri Martino
- Education: Brown University
- Occupations: Actress; blogger
- Years active: 1992–present
- Spouse(s): Kyle Martino (m. 2011; div. 2020) Ian Hock (m. 2024)
- Children: 3
- Parents: Franco Amurri; Susan Sarandon
- Relatives: Antonio Amurri (grandfather); Miles Robbins (half-brother)

Eva Amurri (born March 15, 1985) is an American actress.

== Early life ==
Eva Amurri was born on March 15, 1985, in New York City, to Italian film director Franco Amurri and American actress Susan Sarandon (whose mother's ancestry was Italian). Amurri was raised by her mother and her mother's long-time partner Tim Robbins in Greenwich Village, Lower Manhattan. She has two maternal half-brothers, Jack and Miles, as well as two paternal half-siblings, Leone and Augusta, from her father's marriage to Heide Lund, and two stepsisters, Tallulah and Ruby, from Lund's previous marriage to Lord Antony Isaacs, son of Michael Isaacs, 3rd Marquess of Reading.

She graduated from Saint Ann's School in Brooklyn, New York, and Brown University.

== Career ==
Amurri had a role in the comedy film The Banger Sisters (2002), in which her mother starred, with Amurri playing the daughter of her mother's character. She guest-starred, along with her mother, on an episode of Friends in Season 7 Episode 15 ("The One with Joey's New Brain") in which she is slapped by Sarandon. In 2004, she appeared in Saved!. She guest-hosted Attack of the Show! with Kevin Pereira. In 2009, she had a role in the third season of the Showtime series Californication, where she played Jackie, a stripper, student and love interest of central character Hank Moody (David Duchovny). Amurri played the leading role in the 2008 film Middle of Nowhere.

In 2009, she appeared as Shelly in the episode "The Playbook" of How I Met Your Mother. Amurri starred in the thriller film Isolation, directed by Stephen T. Kay.

In 2010, she appeared in the Fox series House as Nicole in the episode "The Choice". In 2012, she appeared in Happy Madison Productions' That's My Boy as young Mary McGarricle. Her mother also appeared in the film as McGarricle's older self.

Amurri began her popular lifestyle blog "Happily Eva After" in 2015.

== Personal life ==
Amurri married former Major League Soccer player and former NBC Sports broadcaster Kyle Martino in 2011. They have three children. Amurri and Martino separated in 2019, and divorced in the following year. She announced her engagement to chef Ian Hock in 2023; they married in 2024 and live in Westport, Connecticut.

== Filmography ==
=== Film ===
| Year | Title | Role | Notes |
|---|---|---|---|
| 1992 | Bob Roberts | Child in hospital | |
| 1995 | Dead Man Walking | 9-year-old Helen Prejean | |
| 1999 | Anywhere but Here | Girl at Beverly Hills High School | |
| 2002 | Made-Up | Sara Tivey | |
| 2002 | The Banger Sisters | Ginger Kingsley | |
| 2004 | Saved! | Cassandra Edelstein | |
| 2007 | The Education of Charlie Banks | Mary | |
| 2007 | The Life Before Her Eyes | Maureen | |
| 2008 | New York, I Love You | Sarah | Segment: "Randy Balsmeyer" |
| 2008 | Middle of Nowhere | Grace Berry | |
| 2008 | Animals | Jane | |
| 2011 | Isolation | Amy Moore | |
| 2012 | That's My Boy | Young Mary McGarricle | |
| 2013 | AmeriQua | Vicky | |
| 2013 | Stag | Veronica | |
| 2016 | Mothers and Daughters | Gayle | |

=== Television ===
| Year | Title | Role | Notes |
|---|---|---|---|
| 1999 | Earthly Possessions | Teenage girl | Television film |
| 2001 | Friends | Dina Lockhart | Episode: "The One with Joey's New Brain" |
| 2009 | Californication | Jackie | 9 episodes |
| 2009, 2014 | How I Met Your Mother | Shelly | 2 episodes |
| 2010 | Mercy | Sharra Kelly | 2 episodes |
| 2010 | House | Nicole Murray | Episode: "The Choice" |
| 2010 | Childrens Hospital | Lovely Nurse | Episode: "I Am Not Afraid of Any Ghost" |
| 2011 | Fish Hooks | Bleak Molly (voice) | Episode: "The Dark Side of the Fish" |
| 2011, 2013 | New Girl | Beth | 2 episodes |
| 2012 | Guys with Kids | Jennifer Thomas | Episode: "Chris' New Girlfriend" |
| 2013 | The Mindy Project | Lucy | 2 episodes |
| 2014 | Undateable | Sabrina | 8 episodes |
| 2015 | The Secret Life of Marilyn Monroe | Young Gladys Monroe Mortenson | Miniseries |
| 2022 | Monarch | Young Dottie Roman | Recurring role |
