= Marcus Giamatti =

American actor (born 1961)

- Born: Marcus Bartlett Giamatti; October 3, 1961 (age 65); New Haven, Connecticut, U.S.
- Education: Bowdoin College (BA); Yale University (MFA)
- Occupation: Actor
- Years active: 1986–present
- Children: 3
- Father: Bart Giamatti
- Relatives: Paul Giamatti (brother)

Marcus Bartlett Giamatti (born October 3, 1961) is an American actor, musician, writer and director. He is best known for being a regular member of the cast of the CBS drama series Judging Amy. He is a graduate of The Yale School of Drama, receiving the Carole Dye Award for Excellence in Performance.

== Early life ==
Giamatti was born on October 3, 1961, in New Haven, Connecticut, and is the son of Toni Marilyn (née Smith) and former Yale University president and Major League Baseball commissioner A. Bartlett Giamatti, and older brother of actor Paul Giamatti. He attended Foote School, Hopkins School, Bowdoin College in Brunswick, Maine, where he was a member of the Delta Sigma fraternity, and Yale University in New Haven.

== Career ==
Giamatti started his career on the soap opera One Life to Live, but is likely best known for his series regular role on the CBS drama series Judging Amy, where he played the title character's older brother Peter Gray throughout the series' six season run (1999-2005). He has also guest-starred on a number of popular series, such as The X-Files, Homicide: Life on the Street, Monk, The Mentalist, House M.D. and Criminal Minds. He has less frequently appeared in films, which include Mr. and Mrs. Bridge, Necessary Roughness, and the television docudrama Pirates of Silicon Valley.

== Personal life ==
Marcus is married to singer/songwriter Bree Olivea Giamatti (Olivea Watson). Together they have three daughters: Ophelia Rosalee (born in 2009), Floralina Delilah (born in 2012), and Magnolia Pearl (born in 2015).

An accomplished musician, Giamatti plays bass guitar in several bands in Los Angeles, including the alternative folk-rock group Olivea, and the psychedelic jam band Rebel Soul. He is also a session musician and a member of Musicians Local 47.

Giamatti tossed the ceremonial first pitch at the 1989 World Series opener, played in Oakland, California.

From 2010–14, he has guest starred on series including Fringe, The Closer, Revenge, Bones and NCIS: Los Angeles.

He is an associate professor of theatre (tenure track) and head of directing at Temple University in Philadelphia, Pennsylvania, where he teaches acting and directing and regularly directs Temple Theaters productions.

== Filmography ==
=== Film ===
Year	Title	Role	Notes
1990	Mr. & Mrs. Bridge	Gil Davis	
1991	Necessary Roughness	Sargie 'Fumblina' Wilkinson	
1994	Jimmy Hollywood	BMW Preppie	
1994	3 Ninjas Kick Back	Announcer	
1999	Judy Berlin	Eddie Dillon	
2001	The Business of Strangers	Robert	
2007	On the Doll	Uncle Lou	
2010	The Chosen One	Freddy	
2011	Playing Doctor	Spencer	Short film
2014	The Curse of Downers Grove	Rich	

=== Television ===
Year	Title	Role	Notes
1986	Guiding Light	Reverend	Episode dated March 7, 1986
1989	Another World	Jeff	9 episodes
1991	Hunter	Jack Kane	1 episode: "Fatal Obsession: Part 1"
1991	Aftermath: The Test of Love	Luke	TV movie
1992	Quantum Leap	Rick Upfield	1 episode: "Roberto!"
1992–1993	Flying Blind	Ted Sharperson	Main cast 22 episodes
1993	Living Single	Jack Peabody	1 episode: "Full Court Press"
1994	Monty	Principal Newell	1 episode: "The Principal's Interest"
1996	Dream On	Salesman	1 episode: "Hey Diddle Diddle"
1997	Path to Paradise: The Untold Story of the World Trade Center Bombing	Agent Atkinson	TV movie
1998	Cosby	Doctor	1 episode: "The Episode Episode"
1999	Homicide: Life on the Street	Bernard Abrams	1 episode: "Sideshow: Part 2"
1999	Pirates of Silicon Valley	Daniel Kottke	TV movie
1999–2005	Judging Amy	Peter Gray	Main cast 138 episodes
2000	Hamlet	Guildenstern	TV movie
2002	The X-Files	John Gillnitz	1 episode: "Jump the Shark"
2005	Criminal Minds	Dr. Barry Landman	1 episode: "L.D.S.K."
2007	Crossing Jordan	Donald Hagen	1 episode: "Night of the Living Dead"
2007	Cold Case	Larry Kenick	1 episode: "The Good Death"
2007	Tell Me You Love Me	Jeff	3 episodes: "Episode #1.3", "Episode #1.7", "Episode #1.8"
2008	Life	Dave Harris	1 episode: "Black Friday"
2009	Monk	John Keyes	1 episode: "Mr. Monk and the Lady Next Door"
2009	The Mentalist	Gabriel Fanning	1 episode: "A Dozen Red Roses"
2009	Medium	Lane Pauling	1 episode: "The Medium is the Message"
2009	House	Keener	1 episode: "Known Unknowns"
2009	CSI: Crime Scene Investigation	Chevy Cigs	1 episode: "Lover's Lanes"
2010	NCIS	Victor Tillman	1 episode: "Ignition"
2010	Lie to Me	Fentris	1 episode: "Darkness and Light"
2010	Fringe	Ray Duffy	1 episode: Do Shapeshifters Dream of Electric Sheep?"
2010	Look: The Series	Lenny	Main cast 3 episodes
2010	The Defenders	Lawyer #2	1 episode: "Las Vegas vs. Johnson"
2011	Detroit 1-8-7	Vaughn Prince	1 episode: "Ice Man/Malibu"
2011	CSI: Miami	Hugh Parker	1 episode: "Blood Lust"
2011	The Closer	Glen Lynch	1 episode: "Under Control"
2011	The Young and the Restless	Dr. Felix	3 episodes: "Episode #1.9750", "Episode #1.9752", "Episode #1.9755"
2012	Revenge	Dr. Ray Clemons	1 episode: "Grief"
2012	Common Law	Derek Winfield	1 episode: "Ride-Along"
2012	Blue Lagoon: The Awakening	Principal Thomas	TV movie
2012	Vegas	Scotty Garrity	1 episode: "All That Glitters"
2012–2013	NCIS: Los Angeles	CIA Agent Michael Snyder	2 episodes: "Rude Awakenings: Part 2", "Wanted"
2013	Bunheads	Mr. Cramer	1 episode: "Channing Tatum Is a Fine Actor"
2013	Franklin & Bash	Golf Club Owner	1 episode: "Out of the Blue"
2014	Mighty Med	Sonic Shriek	1 episode: "Fantasy League of Superheroes"
2014	Bones	Forrest Wakefield	1 episode: "The Master in the Slop"
2014	Perception	Joel	1 episode: "Curveball"
2014	Mind Games	Jim McKenna	1 episode: "Cauliflower Man"
2014	Starving in Suburbia	Michael	TV movie
2015	Big Time in Hollywood, FL	Detective Jim Zdorkin	2 episodes: "Episode #1.2", "Art Imitates Death"
2015–2016	CSI: Cyber	Artie Sneed	3 episodes: "Hack E.R.", "Gone In 6 Seconds", "404: Flight Not Found"
2017	S.W.A.T	Professor Marc Lasky	1 episode :Radical
2022	Bosch: Legacy	Simon Wakefield	4 episodes: "Pumped", "Message in a Bottle", "Horseshoes and Hand Grenades", "Plan B"
