= Jennifer Crystal Foley =

American actress (born 1973)

- Born: Jennifer Amie Crystal; January 26, 1973 (age 53)
- Other name: Jennifer Foley
- Occupation: Actress
- Years active: 1989–2018
- Spouse: Michael Foley (m. 2000)
- Children: 2
- Father: Billy Crystal

Jennifer Amie Crystal Foley (born January 26, 1973) is an American retired actress. She is best known for her roles as Christie Parker in Once and Again and Rachel Taub on House. She is the daughter of Billy and Janice Crystal.

== Personal life ==
She married her college boyfriend, Michael Foley, in September 2000. They have two daughters, born in 2003 and 2006.

== Filmography ==
=== Film ===
Year	Title	Role	Notes
1994	City Slickers II: The Legend of Curly's Gold	Jogger	
1995	Girl in the Cadillac	Holiday inn salesgirl	
1995	Losing Isaiah	Park nanny	
1995	The American President	Maria	
1995	Dracula: Dead and Loving It	Nurse	
1996	The Making of a Hollywood Madam	Shanna Fleiss	
1997	35 Miles from Normal	Madeleine	
1997	Fathers' Day	Rose	
1997	Don King: Only in America	Hank's secretary	
2001	61*	Pat Maris	
2002	A Midsummer Night's Rave	Lily	
2003	They Would Love You in France		
2007	Bee Movie	Princess	Voice role
2009	Bride Wars	—N/a	Additional voices
2012	Parental Guidance	Cassandra	
2015	The Hunger Games: Mockingjay – Part 2	—N/a	ADR cast
2017	Smurfs: The Lost Village	—N/a	Additional voices
2018	Incredibles 2	—N/a	Additional voices
2018	The Lie	—N/a	Additional voices

=== Television ===
Year	Title	Role	Notes
1989	Billy Crystal: Midnight Train to Moscow	Helen Crystal	Plays her father's mother at the end of the stand-up special
1991	Sessions	Jennifer Crystal	Six-part mini-series
1993	Beverly Hills, 90210	Deborah	3 episodes
1995	ER	Reba	Episode: "Home"
1996	Space: Above and Beyond	Nurse Larlee	Episode: "R & R"
1997	Arli$$	Lisa Levine	Episode: "What Arliss Hath Joined Together"
1997	NYPD Blue	Marlene Blevins	Episode: "All's Well That Ends Well"
1997	Jenny	Female Customer	Episode: "A Girl's Gotta Live in the Real World"
1997	Caroline in the City	Kathy	Episode: "Caroline and the Used Car Salesman"
1998	Cupid	Kathy	Episode: "End of an Eros"
1998	Beyond Belief: Fact or Fiction	Penny	Segment: "Merry-Go-Round"
2000–2001	Once and Again	Christie Parker	17 episodes
2002	The Practice	Kelly Goss	Episode: "M. Premie Unplugged"
2002	Touched by an Angel	Gail	Episode: "Hello, I Love You"
2002	Providence	Krista	Episode: "The Wedding Planner"
2004	Century City	Mrs. Lazak	Episode: "The Face Was Familiar"
2005	Inconceivable	Mommy Shopper	Episode: "Face Your Demon Semen"
2008–2012	House	Rachel Taub	17 episodes
2009	Eureka	Tabitha	Episode: "If You Build It..."
2009	CSI: Crime Scene Investigation	Jennifer Delaney	Episode: "Lover's Lane"
