= Splendid Animation =

Studio album by Tetra Splendour
- Released: 20 May 2002
- Recorded: 2001–2002
- Genre: Alternative rock, indie rock, progressive rock, art rock
- Length: 50:15
- Label: EMI
- Producer: Lenny Franchi

Tetra Splendour chronology
Splendid Animation (2002)	People in Planes EP (2005)

Splendid Animation is the debut album of the Welsh alternative rock band Tetra Splendour (now People in Planes).
It was recorded at Cardiff's Audio Zone recording studio, with the exception of the track "Pollenfever" which was recorded and mixed at Jacobs Studios, Surrey.

== Track listing ==
1. "Landmine" – 5:57
2. "Global Village" – 4:05
3. "E.T.A." – 3:56
4. "Pollenfever" – 4:06
5. "Bless My Soul" – 4:02
6. "Muriel's Motorhome" – 4:10
7. "Mr. Bishi" – 5:23
8. "De-Rail" – 3:43
9. "C.F.C's" – 4:43
10. "In-Flight Manual" – 4:59
11. "Black and Grey" – 5:07

== Personnel ==
- Gareth Jones – vocals, keyboard, guitar, director
- Pete Roberts – lead guitar, backing vocals
- Kris Blight – bass guitar
- John Maloney – drums, percussion
- Jon Astley – mastering
- Steve Davis – engineer, digital editing
- Edward Skinner – violin
- Paul Durrant – producer, mixing
- Lenny Franchi – producer, mixing for the track "Pollenfever"
- Matt Oliver – digital editing, mixing assistant, assistant producer
- Gareth Jones and Pete Roberts wrote all the songs
- Duncan Illing – A&R
