= List of Police Academy cast members =

This is a list of actors and voice actors who appeared in one or more installments of the Police Academy film and television series.

Character	Films							Television series	
Character	Police Academy	Police Academy 2: Their First Assignment	Police Academy 3: Back in Training	Police Academy 4: Citizens on Patrol	Police Academy 5: Assignment Miami Beach	Police Academy 6: City Under Siege	Police Academy: Mission to Moscow	Police Academy	Police Academy: The Series
Character	1984	1985	1986	1987	1988	1989	1994	1988 – 1989	1997 – 1998
Larvell Jones	Michael Winslow	Michael Winslow	Michael Winslow	Michael Winslow	Michael Winslow	Michael Winslow	Michael Winslow	Greg Morton	Michael Winslow
Eugene Tackleberry	David Graf	David Graf	David Graf	David Graf	David Graf	David Graf	David Graf	Dan Hennessey	David Graf
Eric Lassard	George Gaynes	George Gaynes	George Gaynes	George Gaynes	George Gaynes	George Gaynes	George Gaynes	Tedd Dillon	George Gaynes
Moses Hightower	Bubba Smith	Bubba Smith	Bubba Smith	Bubba Smith	Bubba Smith	Bubba Smith		Greg Morton	Bubba Smith
Henry J. Hurst	George R. Robertson	George R. Robertson	George R. Robertson	George R. Robertson	George R. Robertson	George R. Robertson			George R. Robertson
Laverne Hooks	Marion Ramsey	Marion Ramsey	Marion Ramsey	Marion Ramsey	Marion Ramsey	Marion Ramsey		Denise Pidgeon	
Thaddeus Harris	G.W. Bailey	G.W. Bailey (uncredited cameo)		G.W. Bailey	G.W. Bailey	G.W. Bailey	G.W. Bailey	Len Carlson	
Debbie Callahan	Leslie Easterbrook		Leslie Easterbrook	Leslie Easterbrook	Leslie Easterbrook	Leslie Easterbrook	Leslie Easterbrook	Denise Pidgeon	Leslie Easterbrook
Carl Proctor		Lance Kinsey	Lance Kinsey	Lance Kinsey	Lance Kinsey	Lance Kinsey		Don Francks	
Carey Mahoney	Steve Guttenberg	Steve Guttenberg	Steve Guttenberg	Steve Guttenberg				Ron Rubin	
Douglas Fackler	Bruce Mahler	Bruce Mahler	Bruce Mahler			Bruce Mahler			
Chad Copeland	Scott Thomson		Scott Thomson	Scott Thomson					
Zed McGlunk		Bob Goldthwait	Bob Goldthwait	Bob Goldthwait				Dan Hennessey	
Carl Sweetchuck		Tim Kazurinsky	Tim Kazurinsky	Tim Kazurinsky				Howard Morris	
Bud Kirkland		Andrew Paris	Andrew Paris	Andrew Paris					
Ernie Mauser		Art Metrano	Art Metrano					Rex Hagon (as Bouser)	Art Metrano (As Meiser)
Kyle Blankes	Brant von Hoffman		Brant von Hoffman						
Hooker	Georgina Spelvin		Georgina Spelvin						
Kathleen Kirkland-Tackleberry		Colleen Camp		Colleen Camp					Coleen Camp (archive footage)
Tomoko Nogata			Brian Tochi	Brian Tochi					
Thomas "House" Conklin				Tab Thacker	Tab Thacker			Don Francks	
Nick Lassard					Matt McCoy	Matt McCoy			
Leslie Barbara	Donovan Scott								
Karen Thompson	Kim Cattrall								
George Martin	Andrew Rubin								
Pete Lassard		Howard Hesseman							
Vinnie Schtulman		Peter Van Norden							
Karen Adams			Shawn Weatherly						
Cadet Hedges			David Huband						
Claire Mattson				Sharon Stone					
Kyle Ault				David Spade					
Arnie Lewis				Brian Backer					
Mouse					Archie Hahn				
Kate Stratton					Janet Jones				
The Mayor / The Mastermind						Kenneth Mars			
Kyle Connors							Charlie Schlatter		
Katrina Sergeeva							Claire Forlani		
Constantine Konali							Ron Perlman		
Commandant Rakov							Christopher Lee		
Yuri Talinsky							Gregg Berger		
Professor								Emperor Arroyo	
Richard Casey									Matthew Borlenghi
Rusty Ledbetter									Rod Crawford
Dirk Tackleberry									Toby Proctor
Dean Tackleberry									Jeremiah Birkett
Annie Medford									Heather Campbell
Alicia Conchita Montoya Cervantes									Christine Gonzales
Luke Kackley									Tony Longo
Lester Shane									P.J. Ochlan
Stuart Hefilfinger									Joe Flaherty

== Film series ==
Actor	Character	Film(s)
René Auberjonois	Tony (gangster)	5
Brian Backer	Arnie	4
G. W. Bailey	Thaddeus Harris	1, 4, 5, 6, 7
Arthur Batanides	Kirkland	2, 3, 4, 6
Gregg Berger	Talinsky	7
Corinne Bohrer	Laura	4
Billie Bird	Lois Feldman	4
Colleen Camp	Kathleen Kirkland	2, 4
Kim Cattrall	Karen Thompson	1
Leslie Easterbrook	Debbie Callahan	1, 3, 4, 5, 6, 7
Claire Forlani	Katrina	7
George Gaynes	Eric Lassard	1, 2, 3, 4, 5, 6, 7
Bobcat Goldthwait	Zed	2, 3, 4
David Graf	Eugene Tackleberry	1, 2, 3, 4, 5, 6, 7
Gerrit Graham	Ace	6
Steve Guttenberg	Carey Mahoney	1, 2, 3, 4
Archie Hahn	Mouse	5
Ed Herlihy	Dooley	2
Howard Hesseman	Peter 'Pete' Lassard	2
Janet Jones	Kate	5
Tim Kazurinsky	Sweetchuck	2, 3, 4
Lance Kinsey	Proctor	2, 3, 4, 5, 6
Don Lake	Mr. Wig	1
Jerry Lazarus	Sugar	5
Christopher Lee	Alexandrei Nikolaivich Rakov	7
Bruce Mahler	Douglas Fackler	1, 2, 3, 6
Kenneth Mars	Mayor/Mastermind	6
Derek McGrath	Butterworth	4
Matt McCoy	Nick Lassard	5, 6
Art Metrano	Mauser	2, 3
Ed Nelson	Gov. Neilson	3
Andrew Paris	Bud Kirkland	2, 3, 4
Ron Perlman	Konstantine Konali	7
Marion Ramsey	Laverne Hooks	1, 2, 3, 4, 5, 6
George R. Robertson	Henry Hurst	1, 2, 3, 4, 5, 6
Ted Ross	Capt. Reed	1
Andrew Rubin	George Martin	1
Charlie Schlatter	Kyle Conners	7
Debralee Scott	Mrs. Fackler	1, 3
Donovan Scott	Leslie Barbara	1
Bubba Smith	Moses Hightower	1, 2, 3, 4, 5, 6
David Spade	Kyle	4
David Huband	Cadet Hedges	3
Georgina Spelvin	Prostitute	1, 3
Sharon Stone	Claire Mattson	4
Tab Thacker	Tommy "House" Conklin	4, 5
Scott Thomson	Chad Copeland	1, 3, 4
Brian Tochi	Tomoko Nogata	3, 4
Peter Van Norden	Vinnie Schtulman	2
Brant von Hoffman	Kyle Blankes	1, 3
Michael Winslow	Larvell Jones	1, 2, 3, 4, 5, 6, 7

== Animated series ==
Voice actor	Character
Ron Rubin	Carey Mahoney
Greg Morton	Larvell Jones, Moses Hightower
Dan Hennessey	Zed, Eugene Tackleberry
Howard Morris	Sweetchuck, Professor
Don Francks	Tommy "House" Conklin, Proctor
Denise Pidgeon	Laverne Hooks, Debbie Callahan
Len Carlson	Thaddeus Harris
Tedd Dillon	Eric Lassard
Rex Hagon	Mauser (Bouser)
unknown	Kingpin
unknown	Mr. Sleaze
unknown	Auntie Bertha
unknown	Ed
unknown	Ned
unknown	Mayor

== Television series ==
Actor	Character
David Graf	Eugene Tackleberry
Leslie Easterbrook	Debbie Callahan
Bubba Smith	Moses Hightower
Michael Winslow	Larvell Jones
Art Metrano	Mauser (Miser)

== Major characters in films and television series ==
Actor	Voice actor	Character	Role	Film(s)	Animated series	Television series
Michael Winslow	Greg Morton	Larvell Jones	Cadet (1°film); Officer (6 films)	All films	Animated series	Television series
David Graf	Dan Hennessey	Eugene Tackleberry	Cadet (1°film); Officer (6 films)	All films	Animated series	Television series
George Gaynes	Tedd Dillon	Eric Lassard	Commandant	All films	Animated series	Television series
Bubba Smith	Greg Morton	Moses Hightower	Floverist/Cadet (1°film); Officer (2 thru 6 films)	1, 2, 3, 4, 5, 6	Animated series	Television series
Marion Ramsey	Denise Pidgeon	Laverne Hooks	Cadet (1°film); Officer (2 at 6 films)	1, 2, 3, 4, 5, 6	Animated series
George R. Robertson		Henry J. Hurst	Commissioner	1, 2, 3, 4, 5, 6		Television series
Steve Guttenberg	Ron Rubin	Carey Mahoney	Cadet (1°film); Officer/Sergeant (2-4 films)	1, 2, 3, 4	Animated series
Bruce Mahler		Cadet (1°film); Officer (2 at 6 films)	1, 2, 3; 6
Leslie Easterbrook	Denise Pidgeon	Debbie Callahan	Sergeant (1°film); Officer (3 thru 7 films)	1; 3, 4, 5, 6, 7	Animated series	Television series
Scott Thomson	Chad Copeland	Cadet (1°film); Officer (3 and 4 films)
Brant Von Hoffman	Kyle Blankes	Cadet (1°film); Officer (3 films)
G. W. Bailey	Len Carlson	Thaddeus Harris	Lt. (1 and 2°films); Captain (4 thru 7 films; animated series)	1, 2; 4, 5, 6, 7	Animated series
Donovan Scott	Leslie Barbara	Cadet (1°film);
Andrew Rubin	George Martin	Cadet (1°film);
Kim Cattrall	Karen Thompson	Cadet (1°film);
Lance Kinsey	Don Francks	Proctor	Sergeant (2 and 3 films); L.T (4 thru 6 films; animated series)	2, 3, 4, 5, 6	Animated series
Tim Kazurinsky	Howard Morris	Carl Sweetchuck	Shopman (2°film); Cadet (3°film); Officer (4°film; animated series)	2, 3, 4	Animated series
Tab Thacker	Don Francks	Tommy "House" Conklin	C.O.P Programme (4°film); Cadet/Officer (5°film; animated series)	4, 5	Animated series
Matt McCoy		Nick Lassard	Officer	5, 6
