= Police Academy (franchise) =

Series of American comedy films

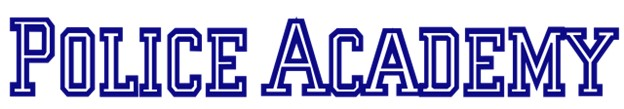
- Official franchise logo
- Original work: Police Academy
- Owners: Warner Bros. (Skydance)
- Years: 1984–present

Films and television
- Films: Police Academy; Police Academy 2: Their First Assignment; Police Academy 3: Back in Training; Police Academy 4: Citizens on Patrol; Police Academy 5: Assignment Miami Beach; Police Academy 6: City Under Siege; Police Academy: Mission to Moscow
- Television series: Police Academy: The Series
- Animated series: Police Academy

Miscellaneous
- Theme park attraction: Police Academy Stunt Show (1994)
- Character(s): List of characters

Police Academy is an American comedy franchise of seven theatrical films and two spin-off television shows. The 1984 film Police Academy followed the premise of a new mayor requiring the local police department to accept all recruits. The film franchise relies heavily on slapstick humor and physical comedy, as the misfit recruits attempt to prove themselves capable of being police officers, succeeding despite their eccentricities. The first four films follow Carey Mahoney (Steve Guttenberg), a repeat offender forced to join the police academy as punishment. The 1994 film Mission to Moscow marked the seventh installment, with cast members George Gaynes, Michael Winslow, and David Graf appearing throughout the film series.

The first film grossed $149.8 million worldwide. While the subsequent films failed to impress critics, they sustained commercial success, grossing $391 million in total. Parallels have been drawn between Police Academy and the British Carry On series, for their common tropes of a returning ensemble cast, frequent use of lowbrow humor, and reliance on sexual innuendo.

Guttenberg announced in September 2018 that a new Police Academy movie was in the works after spending years in development hell.

== Films ==
Overview of Police Academy films
Film	U.S. release date	Director	Screenwriter(s)	Producer(s)
Police Academy	March 23, 1984	Hugh Wilson	Neal Israel, Pat Proft & Hugh Wilson	Paul Maslansky
Police Academy 2: Their First Assignment	March 29, 1985	Jerry Paris	Barry W. Blaustein & David Sheffield	Paul Maslansky
Police Academy 3: Back in Training	March 21, 1986	Jerry Paris	Gene Quintano	Paul Maslansky
Police Academy 4: Citizens on Patrol	April 3, 1987	Jim Drake	Gene Quintano	Paul Maslansky
Police Academy 5: Assignment Miami Beach	March 18, 1988	Alan Myerson	Stephen Curwick	Paul Maslansky
Police Academy 6: City Under Siege	March 10, 1989	Peter Bonerz	Stephen Curwick	Paul Maslansky
Police Academy: Mission to Moscow	August 26, 1994	Alan Metter	Randolph Davis & Michele S. Chodos	Paul Maslansky

=== Police Academy (1984) ===
Police Academy was released in 1984 and directed by Hugh Wilson. The film has a newly elected female mayor announcing a policy requiring the police department to accept all willing recruits. The movie followed a group of misfit recruits in their attempts to prove themselves capable of being police officers and their adventures at the police academy.

=== Police Academy 2: Their First Assignment (1985) ===
In Police Academy 2: Their First Assignment, the newly graduated cadets are sent to one of the worst precincts in the city to improve the conditions. Lt. Mauser undermines their attempts so he can get Capt. Lassard fired and get the position in charge.

=== Police Academy 3: Back in Training (1986) ===
Police Academy 3: Back in Training was released in 1986, and like its predecessor, was directed by Jerry Paris. When the governor of the state announces that budget cuts necessitate the closure of the worst of the two police academies, the officers of the Metropolitan Police Academy, led by Commandant Lassard, work on ensuring it is not theirs. This is hindered by their unusual gang of new cadets.

=== Police Academy 4: Citizens on Patrol (1987) ===
Police Academy 4: Citizens on Patrol, released in 1987 and directed by Jim Drake, involves new recruits being brought in when the officers work with a newly formed Citizens on Patrol group. Harris and Proctor are in charge, though, and plan to dismantle the program. Citizens on Patrol was the final film starring Guttenberg.

=== Police Academy 5: Assignment Miami Beach (1988) ===
Police Academy 5: Assignment Miami Beach, released in 1988, was directed by Alan Myerson. The plot involves the officers attending a police convention in Florida to honor Commandant Eric Lassard as police officer of the decade, wherein he inadvertently switches his sports bag with that of a group of jewel thieves. The thieves try to get it back.

=== Police Academy 6: City Under Siege (1989) ===
The sixth installment, Police Academy 6: City Under Siege, directed by Peter Bonerz, was released in 1989. When the city suffers from a dangerous set of crimes by a gang of jewel thieves, the Metropolitan Police Academy graduates are brought in to do something about it.

=== Police Academy: Mission to Moscow (1994) ===
Police Academy: Mission to Moscow, released in 1994 and directed by Alan Metter, involved the officers going to Russia to help catch an international crime figure.

=== Future ===
A franchise reboot has been in various stages of development hell since September 2003, when the eighth Police Academy film was announced with a tentative release scheduled for 2007. The studio acknowledged the franchise's return after more than thirteen years of absence, Paul Maslansky stated, "I felt it was time to start again. I saw that Starsky & Hutch and a number of other revivals were doing really well. Police Academy has such a great history, so I thought, 'Why not?'" with most of the main cast members set to return. Hugh Wilson was later slated to direct. Leslie Easterbrook (Capt. Debbie Callahan) and Marion Ramsey (Sgt. Laverne Hooks) mentioned that filming for the next Police Academy film was scheduled to commence principal photography mid-2006 to meet its 2007 release. The film was suspended in October 2006, at which point Easterbrook mentioned that the project may be repurposed as a direct-to-DVD sequel. She added that though Warner Bros. wanted to do a new film, they wanted a producer to get independent financing.

In May 2008, Michael Winslow replied to a question about a possible new Police Academy film: "Anything's possible. You've got to hope for Paul Maslansky and those folks over there to put it together. It's up to them. It would be great to see everyone again." In November of the same year, Steve Guttenberg (Sgt. Carey Mahoney) confirmed that 8 was still in development and that he was working on the script with Warner Bros. Guttenberg is slated to direct the film, and stated that all living cast members from the previous installments would return to reprise their roles.

In March 2010, New Line announced plans to revive the Police Academy franchise, with a new film in development with Paul Maslansky attached as filmmaker. Maslansky stated, "It's going to be very worthwhile to the people who remember it and to those who saw it on TV ... It's going to be a new class. We hope to discover new talent and season it with great comedians. It'll be anything but another movie with a numeral next to it. And we'll most probably retain the wonderful musical theme." Later that month, the filmmaker stated that he plans to bring back some of the original cast to train the new recruits. While appearing as a guest on the July 12, 2010, edition of This Morning, Michael Winslow (Sgt. Larvell Jones) confirmed that Police Academy 8 was in active development. In August 2010, Steve Guttenberg revealed a script was being written by David Diamond and David Weissman. In August 2010, actor Bobcat Goldthwait (Officer Zed) released a statement urging Hollywood to reboot the Police Academy series with a new group of actors instead of the original cast members. Goldthwait confirmed that Steve Guttenberg would return and that movie bosses were trying to get Kim Cattrall and Sharon Stone to return for an eighth film, though Goldthwait said he had no desire to return to the series.

By January 2012, New Line Cinema announced that Scott Zabielski would replace Maslansky as the director of the upcoming film. Later in March of the same year, Michael Winslow stated that production of the eighth film tentatively scheduled to commence that November, and that an offer had been made to Shaquille O'Neal to replace the late Bubba Smith as Hightower. In June 2012, Jeremy Garelick was hired to contribute to a rewrite the aforementioned script. In April 2014, Keegan-Michael Key and Jordan Peele, from the sketch show Key & Peele were brought in produce the film. Steve Guttenberg shared his excitement with the project in July 2015, as the project was rumored to be titled Police Academy: Next Generation. In April 2016, the two said that the project was still ongoing and that it was going to be influenced by End of Watch and M*A*S*H. They said that the project would be a "funny take on a grounded, real approach as the Key and Peele way", and noted that it would give them access to talk about what was going on in the landscape at the time. After years of delays, Steve Guttenberg announced in September 2018, that the sequel was once again in active development; stating, "the next Police Academy is coming, no details yet, but it is in a gift bag being readied!" In 2021, when asked about an eight film, Guttenberg replied with "I suspect you haven't seen the last of my Mahoney". In 2026, it was revealed that Key and Peele's reboot had been scrapped in 2014 following the death of Michael Brown, as the studio felt it would be in poor taste to release a comedy film about police officers.

== Television ==
Overview of Police Academy television series
Series	Season	Episodes	First released	Last released	Showrunner(s)	Network(s)
Police Academy	2	65	September 11, 1988	January 28, 1989	Paul Maslansky	Broadcast syndication
Police Academy: The Series	1	26	September 12, 1997	May 25, 1998	Paul Maslansky	Broadcast syndication

=== Police Academy (1988–1989) ===
An animated comedy titled Police Academy, also known as Police Academy: The Animated Series, was produced by Ruby-Spears Productions and Warner Bros. Television. It ran from September 1988 to September 1989, lasting two seasons with 65 episodes produced.

=== Police Academy: The Series (1997–1998) ===
Police Academy: The Series is a 1997 live-action show based on the films, comprising 26 episodes, each one hour. It was produced by Warner Bros. Television and Protocol Entertainment. Michael Winslow reprised his role from the films, and several others made occasional guest appearances.

== Comic books ==
A six-issue series of Police Academy comic books was produced as a spin-off of the animated series beginning in August 1989. The series was published by Marvel Comics, under a "Star Comics Presents" byline.

The series was written by Angelo DeCesare, pencilled by Howard Post, and inked by Jacqueline Roettcher.

== Main cast and characters ==
Overview of Police Academy cast and characters
Character	Films							Television series	
Character	Police Academy	Police Academy 2: Their First Assignment	Police Academy 3: Back in Training	Police Academy 4: Citizens on Patrol	Police Academy 5: Assignment Miami Beach	Police Academy 6: City Under Siege	Police Academy: Mission to Moscow	Police Academy	Police Academy: The Series
Character	1984	1985	1986	1987	1988	1989	1994	1988–1989	1997–1998
Carey Mahoney	Steve Guttenberg	Steve Guttenberg	Steve Guttenberg	Steve Guttenberg				Ron Rubin	
Moses Hightower	Bubba Smith	Bubba Smith	Bubba Smith	Bubba Smith	Bubba Smith	Bubba Smith		Greg Morton	Bubba Smith (guest)
Larvell Jones	Michael Winslow	Michael Winslow	Michael Winslow	Michael Winslow	Michael Winslow	Michael Winslow	Michael Winslow	Greg Morton	Michael Winslow
Eugene Tackleberry	David Graf	David Graf	David Graf	David Graf	David Graf	David Graf	David Graf	Dan Hennessey	David Graf (guest)
Eric Lassard	George Gaynes	George Gaynes	George Gaynes	George Gaynes	George Gaynes	George Gaynes	George Gaynes	Tedd Dillon	George Gaynes (guest)
Laverne Hooks	Marion Ramsey	Marion Ramsey	Marion Ramsey	Marion Ramsey	Marion Ramsey	Marion Ramsey		Denise Pidgeon	
Henry J. Hurst	George R. Robertson	George R. Robertson	George R. Robertson	George R. Robertson	George R. Robertson	George R. Robertson			George R. Robertson (guest)
Debbie Callahan	Leslie Easterbrook		Leslie Easterbrook	Leslie Easterbrook	Leslie Easterbrook	Leslie Easterbrook	Leslie Easterbrook	Denise Pidgeon	Leslie Easterbrook (guest)
Thaddeus Harris	G. W. Bailey			G. W. Bailey	G. W. Bailey	G. W. Bailey	G. W. Bailey	Len Carlson	
Carl Proctor		Lance Kinsey	Lance Kinsey	Lance Kinsey	Lance Kinsey	Lance Kinsey		Don Francks	
Douglas Fackler	Bruce Mahler	Bruce Mahler	Bruce Mahler			Bruce Mahler			
Violet Fackler	Debralee Scott		Debralee Scott						
Bud Kirkland		Andrew Paris	Andrew Paris	Andrew Paris					
Carl Sweetchuck		Tim Kazurinsky	Tim Kazurinsky	Tim Kazurinsky				Howard Morris	
Zed McGlunk		Bobcat Goldthwait	Bobcat Goldthwait	Bobcat Goldthwait				Dan Hennessey	
Chad Copeland	Scott Thomson		Scott Thomson	Scott Thomson					
Kyle Blankes	Brant von Hoffman		Brant von Hoffman						
Kathleen Kirkland		Colleen Camp		Colleen Camp					
Ernie Mauser		Art Metrano	Art Metrano					Rex Hagon	Art Metrano (guest)
Tomoko Nogata			Brian Tochi	Brian Tochi					
Thomas Conklin				Tab Thacker	Tab Thacker			Don Francks	
Nick Lassard					Matt McCoy	Matt McCoy			

== Additional crew and production details ==
Production details of the Police Academy franchise
Title	Crew/Detail					
Title	Composer(s)	Cinematographer	Editor(s)	Production companies	Distributing company	Running time
Police Academy	Robert Folk	Michael D. Margulies	Robert Brown & Zach Staenberg	Warner Bros.: a Warner Communications Company, Paul Maslansky Productions, The Ladd Company	Warner Bros. Pictures	1 hr 36 mins
Police Academy 2: Their First Assignment	Robert Folk	James Crabe	Bob Wyman	Warner Bros.: a Warner Communications Company, Paul Maslansky Productions, The Ladd Company	Warner Bros. Pictures	1 hr 27 mins
Police Academy 3: Back in Training	Robert Folk	Robert Saad	Bud Molin	Warner Bros.: a Warner Communications Company, Paul Maslansky Productions, Jerry Paris Films, Police Academy Productions	Warner Bros. Pictures	1 hr 23 mins
Police Academy 4: Citizens on Patrol	Robert Folk	Robert Saad	David Rawlins	Warner Bros. Inc.: Warner Communications Inc., Paul Maslansky Productions	Warner Bros. Pictures	1 hr 28 mins
Police Academy 5: Assignment Miami Beach	Robert Folk	James Pergola	Hubert C. de la Bouillerie	Warner Bros. Inc.: Warner Communications Inc., Paul Maslansky Productions, Alan Myerson Films	Warner Bros. Pictures	1 hr 30 mins
Police Academy 6: City Under Siege	Robert Folk	Charles Rosher Jr.	Hubert C. de la Bouillerie	Warner Bros. Inc.: a Warner Communications Company, Paul Maslansky Productions	Warner Bros. Pictures	1 hr 24 mins
Police Academy: The Animated Series	Scott Thomas Canfield and John Debney	Director of Animation: Ric Gonzalez	Chip Yaras	Warner Bros. Television, Ruby-Spears Enterprises	Syndication	21 hrs 40 mins (20 mins/episode)
Police Academy: Mission to Moscow	Robert Folk	Ian Jones	Dennis Hill & Suzanne Hines	Warner Bros., Paul Maslansky Productions	Warner Bros. Pictures	1 hr 23 mins
Police Academy: The Series	Ken Harrison, Ken Williams, Karel Roessingh, Jim Guttridge, Daryl Bennett, Ari Wise, and Hal Beckett	Manfred Guthe	Daria Ellerman, Richard Schwadel, and Allyson Boyce	Warner Bros. International Television Productions, Paul Mansky Productions, Goodman/Rosen Productions, Protocol Entertainment	Syndication	26 hrs (60 mins/episode)

== Reception ==
Box office performance of Police Academy films
Film	Release date	Domestic gross	Worldwide gross	Budget
Police Academy	March 23, 1984	$81,198,894	$149,840,000	$4,800,000
Police Academy 2: Their First Assignment	March 29, 1985	$55,600,000	$114,993,000	$7,500,000
Police Academy 3: Back in Training	March 21, 1986	$43,579,163	$107,639,000	$12,239,000
Police Academy 4: Citizens on Patrol	April 3, 1987	$28,061,343	$76,819,000	$17,325,000
Police Academy 5: Assignment Miami Beach	March 18, 1988	$19,510,371	$54,499,000	$13,858,000
Police Academy 6: City Under Siege	March 10, 1989	$11,567,217	$33,190,000	$14,515,000
Police Academy: Mission to Moscow	August 26, 1994	$126,247	$4,300,000	$10,000,000
Total		$239,643,235	$541,280,000	$79,937,000

The films have received overall negative reviews, apart from the first film which had more mixed reviews.

Critical and public response of the Police Academy films
Film	Rotten Tomatoes	Metacritic	CinemaScore
Police Academy	58% (33 reviews)	41 (6 reviews)	—N/a
Police Academy 2: Their First Assignment	32% (19 reviews)	39 (8 reviews)	—N/a
Police Academy 3: Back in Training	36% (11 reviews)	33 (8 reviews)	B+
Police Academy 4: Citizens on Patrol	0% (20 reviews)	26 (8 reviews)	B-
Police Academy 5: Assignment Miami Beach	0% (9 reviews)	18 (10 reviews)	B
Police Academy 6: City Under Siege	0% (9 reviews)	16 (8 reviews)	B-
Police Academy: Mission to Moscow	0% (8 reviews)	11 (4 reviews)	—N/a

== Music ==
- Police Academy: Original Motion Picture Soundtrack
- Police Academy 2: Their First Assignment (Original Motion Picture Soundtrack)
- Police Academy 3: Back in Training (Original Motion Picture Soundtrack)
- Police Academy 4: Citizens on Patrol (Original Motion Picture Soundtrack)
- Police Academy 5: Assignment Miami Beach (Original Motion Picture Soundtrack)
- Police Academy 6: City Under Siege (Original Motion Picture Soundtrack)
- Police Academy: Mission to Moscow (Original Motion Picture Soundtrack)

== Other media ==
=== Video games ===
Two aborted attempts at video game adaptations of the franchise were planned, one by Hasbro for the aborted Control-Vision console, developed by Mark Turmell, and the other was an unlicensed NES game by Tengen.

== See also ==
- Combat Academy
- Moving Violations
- Hamburger: The Motion Picture
- The Last Precinct
- Lavalantula
- Recruits
- Ski Patrol
- Stitches
- Vice Academy
- Weekend Warriors
