= Kathryn Graf =

American actress and playwright

- Occupation: Actress
- Spouse: David Graf (m. 1983; died 2001)

Kathryn Graf is an American actress and playwright.

She guest starred in Police Academy 5: Assignment Miami Beach and has also guest starred in ER and in the Star Trek: Deep Space Nine episode "A Man Alone".

== Personal life ==
She was married to actor David Graf.

== Filmography ==
- Police Academy 5: Assignment Miami Beach (1988) as Stewardess #1
