= Police Academy 3: Back in Training =

1986 film directed by Jerry Paris

- Theatrical release poster by Drew Struzan
- Directed by: Jerry Paris
- Written by: Gene Quintano
- Based on: Characters by: Neal Israel; Pat Proft
- Produced by: Paul Maslansky
- Starring: Steve Guttenberg; Bubba Smith; David Graf; Michael Winslow; Marion Ramsey; Leslie Easterbrook; Art Metrano; Tim Kazurinsky; Bobcat Goldthwait; George Gaynes
- Cinematography: Robert Saad
- Edited by: Bud Molin
- Music by: Robert Folk
- Distributed by: Warner Bros.
- Release date: March 21, 1986
- Running time: 84 minutes
- Country: United States
- Language: English
- Budget: $12 million
- Box office: $107.6 million

Police Academy 3: Back in Training is a 1986 American comedy film directed by Jerry Paris. It is the third installment of the Police Academy franchise and the sequel to Police Academy 2: Their First Assignment.

Despite receiving generally negative reviews, it was an overall box office success, earning $107 million against a budget of $12 million. It is the final directorial effort and film appearance of Jerry Paris, who died 10 days after the films release. The film was followed by Police Academy 4: Citizens on Patrol (1987).

== Plot ==
In an unnamed city, the governor announces that, for budgetary reasons, one of the state's two police academies—run by Commandants Eric Lassard and Ernie Mauser, respectively—is to be closed. Mauser, along with his dim-witted captain, Carl Proctor, conspires with two unscrupulous officers from Lassard's academy, Chad Copeland and Kyle Blankes, to ensure Lassard's institution fails, in exchange for career promotions. Meanwhile, Lassard enlists his current instructors—the glamorous Lieutenant Debbie Callahan, soft-spoken Laverne Hooks, and prankster Larvell Jones—along with a trio of successful former cadets to serve as trainers: the laid-back Carey Mahoney, the towering and strong Moses Hightower, and gun enthusiast Eugene Tackleberry.

New recruits arrive for training, including bumbling Sergeant Douglas Fackler's wife, Violet; the meek Carl Sweetchuck; erratic but reformed ex-gang leader Zed McGlunk, who used to harass Sweetchuck's store; Tackleberry's brother-in-law Bud Kirkland; and the beautiful Karen Adams, whom Mahoney quickly takes a liking to. Mauser transfers Officer Tomoko Nogata, a Japanese exchange officer from Tachikawa, Tokyo, to Lassard's academy, hoping that his ethnicity and broken English will reflect poorly on the institution.

The cadets undergo several weeks of training. Nogata becomes smitten with Callahan, who is impressed by his combat skills. Meanwhile, Sweetchuck, overwhelmed by having to share a room with Zed, decides to quit, until Tackleberry convinces him to stay, promising protection and support. During a training exercise, the recruits' clumsy performance fails to impress the oversight committee evaluating the academies. However, Bud redeems their standing by winning the inter-academy boxing match.

Mauser directs Copeland and Blankes to sabotage the recruits, keeping them sleep-deprived and assigning them premature fieldwork in front of the committee. This leads to a committee member being briefly abducted by Zed's old gang and Violet flipping a police car during a pursuit. Later, when Mauser arrives at a bar to mock Mahoney and the others, they retaliate by applying strong tape over his eyes, which rips off his eyebrows when removed.

Lassard and Mahoney rally the cadets with an uplifting speech, restoring their morale, leading to Karen reciprocating Mahoney's attraction, while Tomoko—following Jones' advice—successfully seduces Callahan. At the policepersons' ball, after being insulted by Proctor, Mahoney enlists an old prostitute friend to trick him into stripping and locking him out of his hotel room. Proctor flees toward the academy but mistakenly stumbles into the Blue Oyster Bar, a notorious gay biker establishment.

Meanwhile, Mauser's sycophantic behavior toward the committee prompts Commissioner Hurst to reveal that Lassard's academy has not impressed the evaluators. Gloating over his apparent victory, Mauser is undercut when Mahoney deceives the committee and attendees by telling them that Mauser suggested basing the final decision solely on the last day's field exercise.

Copeland and Blankes attempt to sabotage the exercise by tampering with the computer system to redirect officers to the wrong locations, but Hooks catches and knocks them out. At the governor's party, a gang of thieves dressed as busboys rob the guests, taking the governor hostage. Mauser's cadets promptly faint upon being threatened by the thieves, but Lassard's cadet Hedges alerts Mahoney, and Lassard and his crew immediately set out to help, while Mauser dismisses the alert as a prank. Mauser's academy is ineffective in reacting to the emergency, but Lassard's squad arrives in time to fight off the thieves and rescue the governor.

The governor shuts down Mauser's academy for failing to stop the robbery at the party, so Lassard's stays open. In the epilogue, Lassard speaks about the academy's gratitude for the "many, many" recruits. The graduating class salutes the camera as the film ends.

== Cast ==
=== Lassard Academy ===
- Steve Guttenberg as Sergeant Carey Mahoney
- Bubba Smith as Sergeant Moses Hightower
- David Graf as Sergeant Eugene Tackleberry
- Michael Winslow as Sergeant Larvell Jones
- Leslie Easterbrook as Lieutenant Debbie Callahan
- Marion Ramsey as Sergeant Laverne Hooks
- Bruce Mahler as Sergeant Douglas Fackler
- George Gaynes as Commandant Eric Lassard
- Scott Thomson as Sergeant Chad Copeland
- Brant von Hoffman as Sergeant Kyle Blankes

=== Mauser Academy ===
- Art Metrano as Commandant Ernie Mauser
- Lance Kinsey as Captain Carl Proctor

=== Lassard's Cadets ===
- Debralee Scott as Cadet Violet Fackler
- Tim Kazurinsky as Cadet Carl Sweetchuck
- Brian Tochi as Cadet Tomoko Nogata
- Andrew Paris as Cadet Bud Kirkland
- Bobcat Goldthwait as Cadet Zed McGlunk
- Shawn Weatherly as Cadet Karen Adams
- David Huband as Cadet Hedges
- Marcia Watkins as Cadet Sarah

=== Mauser's Cadets ===
- R. Christopher Thomas as Cadet Baxter #1
- David James Elliott as Cadet Baxter #2

=== Others ===
- George R. Robertson as Commissioner Henry Hurst
- Ed Nelson as Governor Neilson
- Georgina Spelvin as Hooker
- Arthur Batanides as Mr. Kirkland
- Chas Lawther as Mr. Delaney
- Doug Lennox as Main Bad Guy
- TJ Scott as Robber
- Jerry Paris as Priest

== Production ==
As with other films in the series, the film was shot primarily in Toronto, Ontario, Canada. The city skyline is clearly identifiable in the concluding yacht club scenes. There is also the scene where police recruit Violet Fackler (Debralee Scott) drives a police car up and over a dirt pile out of an alley. At the end of the alley, there is a Toronto Sun paper box. The city grid shown on the computerized dispatch system also shows a map of downtown Toronto streets, with the detail bordering between Trinity, Yonge and Queen streets, and the Gardiner Expressway. In the scene in which Eugene Tackleberry (David Graf) shoots out the television screen with his gun, a Canada Dry soda machine is visible in the background next to a 'C' Plus soda machine, an orange-flavored sparkling beverage that is only sold in Canada.

== Reception ==
=== Box office ===
The film debuted at number one at the box office in the United States. The film grossed $43,579,163 in the United States making it the 17th highest-grossing film of 1986 in the United States. It faced stiff box office competition from many other high-profile comedy films released early that year such as Back To School, Ruthless People, Ferris Bueller's Day Off, Down And Out In Beverly Hills, Legal Eagles, Short Circuit, Running Scared, The Money Pit, Gung Ho, Hannah and Her Sisters, Wildcats and Jo Jo Dancer, Your Life Is Calling. The film grossed $107,639,000 worldwide from a budget of $12 million.

=== Critical response ===
On Rotten Tomatoes, it has an approval rating of 36% based on reviews from 11 critics. On Metacritic, it has a score of 33 out of 100 based on reviews from 8 critics, indicating "generally unfavorable reviews". Audiences polled by CinemaScore gave the film a grade B+.

Variety wrote: "Cast of cartoon misfits is still basically intact and if Police Academy 3 has any charm it's in the good-natured dopeyness of these people. No bones about it, these people are there to laugh at." Kevin Thomas of the Los Angeles Times wrote: "The most you can say for Police Academy 3: Back in Training (citywide) is that it's no worse than Police Academy 2—which was awful."

== Sequel ==
A sequel titled Police Academy 4: Citizens on Patrol, was released in 1987.
