= Just Play Dead =

2026 film by Martin Campbell

- American theatrical release poster
- Directed by: Martin Campbell
- Screenplay by: Dan Gordon
- Produced by: Valentin Dimitrov; Sagiv Diamant; Phil Hunt; Mario Reinach; Moshe Diamant
- Starring: Samuel L. Jackson; Eva Green; María Pedraza
- Cinematography: Giles Nuttgens
- Edited by: Álex Rodríguez
- Music by: Robert Folk
- Production company: Gemstone Films
- Distributed by: Vertigo Releasing (United Kingdom)
- Release dates: 28 August 2026 (United States); 5 October 2026 (United Kingdom)
- Running time: 97 minutes
- Countries: United Kingdom; Bulgaria
- Language: English

Just Play Dead is a 2026 thriller film directed by Martin Campbell and written by Dan Gordon. It stars Samuel L. Jackson, Eva Green, and María Pedraza.

== Cast ==
- Samuel L. Jackson as Jack Wolfe
- Eva Green as Nora Wolfe
- María Pedraza as Bianca
- Eoin Macken as Dani
- Jason Fernández as Chad

== Production ==
In May 2025, it was reported that Samuel L. Jackson, Eva Green, and María Pedraza were starring in a thriller film directed by Martin Campbell and written by Dan Gordon. Principal photography began that month in the Canary Islands. Filming wrapped in mid-November 2025, when Eoin Macken and Jason Fernandez were announced to have joined the cast. Highland Film Group co-financed the film.

In April 2026, it was reported that Robert Folk had composed the score.

== Release ==
Vertical released the film in the United States in select theaters on 28 August 2026, before a digital release on 1 September. Vertigo Releasing released the film in digital platforms across the United Kingdom on 5 October.

== Reception ==
On the review aggregator website Rotten Tomatoes, the film holds an approval rating of 9% based on 11 reviews, with an average rating of 3.4/10.

Andrew Murray of The Upcoming UK wrote, "despite a charismatic turn from Jackson, this deadly cat-and-mouse affair from Casino Royale director Martin Campbell isn’t funny enough to work as a comedy and is too convoluted to generate satisfying thrills." Phil Hoad of The Guardian wrote, "Lacking much mordant snap in the dialogue, and dependent on a trio of over-familiar stereotypes, it’s never quite as funny or sharp as it thinks it is. It has its moments, though."
