= Police Academy 2: Their First Assignment =

1985 film directed by Jerry Paris

- Theatrical release poster by Drew Struzan
- Directed by: Jerry Paris
- Written by: Barry W. Blaustein; David Sheffield
- Based on: Characters by: Neal Israel; Pat Proft
- Produced by: Paul Maslansky; Leonard Kroll
- Starring: Steve Guttenberg; Bubba Smith; David Graf; Michael Winslow; Bruce Mahler; Colleen Camp; Art Metrano; Marion Ramsey; Howard Hesseman; George Gaynes
- Cinematography: James Crabe
- Edited by: Bob Wyman
- Music by: Robert Folk
- Production company: The Ladd Company
- Distributed by: Warner Bros.
- Release date: March 29, 1985
- Running time: 87 minutes
- Country: United States
- Language: English
- Budget: $7.5 million
- Box office: $115 million

Police Academy 2: Their First Assignment is a 1985 American comedy film directed by Jerry Paris. It is the second installment in the Police Academy franchise and the sequel to Police Academy.

Many actors who were in the first film return to reprise their roles. Steve Guttenberg, as Officer Carey Mahoney, the class clown; former American football player Bubba Smith returns as the colossal Moses Hightower; Marion Ramsey is featured again as the soft-spoken Laverne Hooks; David Graf returns as gun-crazy Officer Eugene Tackleberry; Michael Winslow returns as sound effects master Officer Larvell Jones and veteran actor George Gaynes returns as Commandant Eric Lassard. This is the only film in the franchise in which Leslie Easterbrook did not appear as Callahan.

New faces in Police Academy 2 include Howard Hesseman as Captain Pete Lassard (the brother of Police Academy commandant Eric Lassard); Bobcat Goldthwait as Zed McGlunk, the leader of "The Scullions", an obnoxious gang; Art Metrano as Lt. Ernie Mauser; Peter Van Norden as slobbish police dog Officer Vinnie Schtulman; Tim Kazurinsky as hapless business owner Carl Sweetchuck; and Lance Kinsey as Sgt. Carl Proctor. In the film, the Police Academy cadets have graduated and are assigned to the worst precinct in town, where they have to help Captain Pete Lassard fight Zed's gang. The film was followed by Police Academy 3: Back in Training (1986).

== Plot ==
In an unnamed city, serious crime is increasing, particularly in the 16th precinct, which is beset by erratic criminal Zed McGlunk and his violent gang, the Scullions. With the citizens turning against the ineffective, outnumbered, and aging Metropolitan Police, chief Henry Hurst orders precinct Captain Pete Lassard to get the situation under control within 30 days or be replaced, granting him six new officers from the police academy graduating class of 1984: laidback Carey Mahoney, prankster Larvell Jones, gun-fanatic Eugene Tackleberry, gentle giant Moses Hightower, soft-spoken Laverne Hooks and bumbling Douglas Fackler. Seeing an opportunity to take Lassard's position, his Lieutenant, Ernie Mauser, plots to undermine his efforts and the new recruits, alongside his dim-witted partner, Sergeant Carl Proctor.

Tackleberry is reluctantly partnered with Sergeant Kathleen Kirkland, but quickly falls in love with her after realizing they share a passion for firearms. While on patrol, Mahoney and his new partner, the slobby Vinnie Schtulman, respond to an armed robbery at a lamp store owned by businessman Carl Sweetchuck. Chaos ensues when additional officers arrive and mistakenly open fire on each other, allowing the robbers to escape. The confusion leaves the store in ruins, causing $76,813 in damages. Mauser attempts to suspend the officers, but Mahoney's impassioned plea convinces Lassard to give them another chance. Mauser punishes Mahoney by assigning him and Schtulman to patrol a smog-filled road tunnel. In return, Mahoney swaps Mauser's shampoo for an epoxy resin, which glues his hands to his head and leaves him wandering the station naked and pleading for help.

Meanwhile, Zed's gang continues to vandalise and loot the area. Lassard confronts some of Zed's men but ends up outnumbered, spray-painted, and humiliated. Afterward, he gives his officers an inspiring speech, ordering them to take the gang down once and for all. The officers arrest forty-two gang members, sometimes inadvertently. Mauser, seeking to undermine their progress, releases the prisoners, citing improper arrest procedures and excessive force. Mahoney retaliates by arranging for Mauser to undergo a forced body cavity search. Later, Tackleberry and Kirkland go on a date, before professing their love for each other and having sex, after removing their numerous concealed weapons.

On the advice of his brother, Eric, Lassard hosts a street fair to regain public support. Zed's gang arrive and mayhem ensues as the officers are unable to maintain control. The following day, Lassard is removed from the precinct and Mauser is promoted to captain. Mauser suspends Mahoney for the body cavity search, and Schtulman for defending him. The pair plot with Lassard to investigate the gang themselves, sending Mahoney undercover as Jughead, a former member of The Archies gang. Lassard and Schtulman listen in using a concealed Mr. Microphone on Mahoney, as he is taken to the gang's lair in the old abandoned zoo, but he is discovered when the microphone broadcasts a radio advertisement, leading to a knife fight between him and Zed.

Lassard summons every available officer to the zoo, but, hoping to take credit for the arrest, Mauser attempts to infiltrate it himself, resulting in him being trapped hanging upside down. The other officers raid the zoo, leading the gang to panic and attempt to flee, while Lassard, Mahoney, and Laverne confront and arrest Zed and his gang.

Sometime later, the officers, including the reinstated Lassard, Mahoney, and Schtulman, attend the wedding of Tackleberry and Kirkland.

== Cast ==
=== The six new 16th Precinct officers ===
- Steve Guttenberg as Officer Carey Mahoney
- Bubba Smith as Officer Moses Hightower
- David Graf as Officer Eugene Tackleberry
- Michael Winslow as Officer Larvell Jones
- Bruce Mahler as Officer Douglas Fackler
- Marion Ramsey as Officer Laverne Hooks

=== The rest of the 16th Precinct ===
- Colleen Camp as Officer Kathleen Kirkland
- Art Metrano as Lieutenant Ernie Mauser
- Howard Hesseman as Captain Pete Lassard
- Peter Van Norden as Officer Vinnie Schtulman
- Ed Herlihy as Officer Dooley
- Lance Kinsey as Sergeant Carl Proctor

=== Other ===
- George Gaynes as Commandant Eric Lassard
- George R. Robertson as Chief Henry J. Hurst
- Sandy Ward as Sistrunk
- Julie Brown as Chloe
- Tim Kazurinsky as Carl Sweetchuck
- Arthur Batanides as Mr. Kirkland
- Jackie Joseph as Mrs. Kirkland
- Andrew Paris as Bud Kirkland
- Jennifer Darling as The Mayor
- Lucy Lee Flippin as Mom In Car
- Jason Hervey as Brian the Brat in the Car
- Rich Hall as Street Punk
- Jim Reid Boyce as Michael, The Preppy Guy
- Diana Bellamy as Body Cavity Search Nurse

=== The Scullions ===
- Bobcat Goldthwait as Zed McGlunk (billed as Bob Goldthwait)
- Christopher Jackson as "Mojo"
- Church Ortiz as "Flacko"

== Production ==
The first film Police Academy had cost $4.8 million but the second was $7.5 million. Producer Paul Maslansky said the difference was due to filming in Los Angeles rather than Toronto, as in the original. "Shooting in Los Angeles is expensive," he said. "Not because of the city officials; they provide every cooperation. It's the merchants and the property owners who can really hit you. There's so much filming going on that they ask a lot of money for location sites, parking, etc." Maslansky also said "Naturally the actors wanted more money to do the sequel. The above-the- line (principal talent) costs are about a million and a half, and that includes my own fee." He added "We lost some time because I had to change directors after a couple of weeks. But Jerry Paris... has done a great job of catching up."

"I wasn't too sold on doing the sequel," said Steve Guttenberg. "I didn't think the script was as good as the first one. But it has been improved, and after I talked with Paul, I decided to give it another try."

== Reception ==
=== Box office ===
Police Academy 2: Their First Assignment opened on 1,613 screens, grossing $10,675,896 in its opening weekend, setting a record for March. It was the 11th highest-grossing film in the United States in 1985 with a total of $55.6 million. The film grossed $115 million worldwide and made a profit of $20.5 million.

=== Critical response ===
The film received negative reviews. On Rotten Tomatoes, the film has an approval rating of 28% based on 18 reviews. On Metacritic, the film has a score of 39 out of 100 based on reviews from 8 critics, indicating "Generally unfavorable reviews".

Variety wrote: "Follow-up features much of the original's cast but none of its key behind-the-scenes creative talent, save producer Paul Maslansky. Only actor to get any mileage out of this one is series newcomer Art Metrano, as an ambitious lieutenant bent upon taking over the department." Variety had little praise for the film, except "Metrano somehow manages to shine in these murkiest of circumstances, and Michael Winslow has a couple of good moments". Film critic Leonard Maltin gave the movie a BOMB rating (the first of 5 for the series), saying, "There are Dragnet episodes that are funnier than this movie." Siskel & Ebert included it on a 1985 episode of their TV show At the Movies that focused entirely on terrible sequels, though Gene Siskel noted it had two more laughs in it than the 1984 first film did (thereby meaning the sequel had exactly two laughs).

== Sequel ==
A sequel titled Police Academy 3: Back in Training, was released in 1986.
