= Robert Folk =

American composer (born 1949)

- Born: March 5, 1949 (age 77); New York City, New York
- Occupations: Composer, conductor, producer
- Instrument: Orchestra

Robert Elms Folk (born March 5, 1949) is an American film and television composer and conductor who has written over 90 film and television scores, as well as concert works.

== Life and career ==
Robert Folk is a graduate and former faculty member of the Juilliard School in New York City. Since completing his doctorate, Folk has composed and conducted original music for over 90 feature films. His credits include seven Police Academy films, Ace Ventura: When Nature Calls, Nothing To Lose, Tremors (uncredited), The NeverEnding Story II: The Next Chapter, Toy Soldiers, Beastmaster 2: Through the Portal of Time, Kung Pow! Enter the Fist, Boat Trip, Back in the Day, American Pie: Band Camp and most recently, Van Wilder 2 ‘’Just Play Dead’’ Vivaldi.

Among the filmmakers Folk has worked with are Martin Campbell, Roland Joffe, Steve Oedekerk, George Gallo, Gary Sinise, Hugh Wilson, Don Bluth, Jon Davison, Gary Goldman, Steve Rash, David Permut, Gene Quintano, Roger Birnbaum, Ron Underwood, Mark Burg, Thom Mount, Paul Maslansky, George Miller, Fred Zollo, Marty Bregman, Gale Anne Hurd, Marco Weber, Ringo Lam, Jake Eberts and Gary Barber. Folk has also composed numerous concert works including symphonic, vocal and chamber music compositions. His ballet “To Dream of Roses,” composed for the Osaka Worlds Fair, was recorded by the London Symphony Orchestra.

Many of Folk's film scores have been released on compact disc, including Police Academy, The NeverEnding Story II: The Next Chapter, Toy Soldiers, Beastmaster 2: Through the Portal of Time and Maximum Risk.

In 2019, Folk was a guest of honour at the Movie Score Malaga (MOSMA) festival in Spain where selections of his film works were performed in concert by Orquesta Sinfónica Provincial de Málaga.

== Filmography ==
- Savage Harvest (1981)
- The Slayer (1982)
- Police Academy (1984)
- Purple Hearts (1984)
- Bachelor Party (1984)
- Police Academy 2: Their First Assignment (1985)
- Thunder Alley (1985)
- Odd Jobs (1986)
- Police Academy 3: Back in Training (1986)
- Stewardess School (1986)
- Police Academy 4: Citizens on Patrol (1987)
- Can't Buy Me Love (1987)
- Police Academy 5: Assignment Miami Beach (1988)
- Miles from Home (1988)
- Wicked Stepmother (1989)
- Police Academy 6: City Under Siege (1989)
- Happy Together (1989)
- Honeymoon Academy (1989) (Video)
- Tremors (1990) (uncredited)
- The NeverEnding Story II: The Next Chapter (1990)
- Toy Soldiers (1991)
- Beastmaster 2: Through the Portal of Time (1991)
- A Climate for Killing (1991)
- Dragon and Slippers (1991)
- Rock-a-Doodle (1991)
- Loaded Weapon 1 (1993)
- The Princess and the Cobbler (1993)
- Police Academy: Mission to Moscow (1994)
- In the Army Now (1994)
- A Troll in Central Park (1994)
- Trapped in Paradise (1994)
- Ace Ventura: When Nature Calls (1995)
- Theodore Rex (1995)
- The Lawnmower Man 2: Beyond Cyberspace (1996)
- Maximum Risk (1996)
- Rule of Three (1996)
- Booty Call (1997)
- Nothing to Lose (1997)
- Major League: Back to the Minors (1998)
- The Jungle Book: Mowgli's Story (1998) (Video)
- You're Dead... (1999)
- Held Up (1999)
- Thumb Wars (1999)
- All the Queen's Men (2001)
- Kung Pow! Enter the Fist (2002)
- Boat Trip (2002)
- In the Shadow of the Cobra (2004)
- El sol de los venados (2004)
- Back in the Day (2005)
- American Pie Presents: Band Camp (2005) (Video)
- Van Wilder: The Rise of Taj (2006)
- Beethoven's Big Break (2008) (Video)
- Underground (2010)
- Elephant White (2010)
- Silver Cord (2011)
- Vivaldi (2011)
- Havana Heat (2011)
- There Be Dragons (2011)
- The Secret Village (2013)
- The Kid (2015)
- Silent Life (2016)
- Once Upon A Time In Vegas (2023)
- Just Play Dead (2026)

=== Television ===
- Knots Landing (2 episodes, 1982–1983)
- Hart to Hart (4 episodes, 1982–1983)
- Falcon Crest (2 episodes, 1983–1984)
- Faerie Tale Theatre (3 episodes, 1984–1987)
- Tall Tales & Legends (1 episode, 1985)
- Prince of Bel Air (1986)
- Walt Disney's Wonderful World of Color (1 episode, 1986)
- The Twilight Zone (2 episodes, 1986)
- Combat Academy (1986)
- The Room Upstairs (1987)
- Glory Days (1988)
- Jesse Hawkes (1 episode, 1989)
- Mario and the Mob (1992)
- Shadowhunter (1993)
- Sworn to Vengeance (1993)
- Two Fathers: Justice for the Innocent (1994)
- State of Emergency (1994)
- Search and Rescue (1994)
- Family Reunion: A Relative Nightmare (1995)
- National Lampoon's Thanksgiving Family Reunion (2003)

== Awards and nominations ==
Year	Award	Result	Category	Film or series
1996	ASCAP Film and Television Music Awards	Won	Top Box Office Films	Ace Ventura: When Nature Calls
2013	International Film Music Critics Awards	Nominee	Best Original Score for a Drama Film	There Be Dragons
