= List of Police Academy characters =

This article is a list of characters in the Police Academy film and television series.

== Main ==
=== Cadet/Off./Sgt. Carey Mahoney ===
Played by: Steve Guttenberg
Voiced by: Ron Rubin

Cadet/Officer Mahoney is the main character of the first four movies and the animated series. He is a troublemaking, womanizing cad with a heart of gold. His worst habit is retaliating against insults in bizarrely effective ways. For instance, the last straw before his police career was when he was a parking-lot attendant and was forced to park a car for an abusive customer in an otherwise full parking lot. Mahoney put the car into a side-wheelie, crashed it between two cars, and proudly proclaimed, "It fits!". Since his father was a decorated police officer, Mahoney was given the choice of police academy or jail by his father's former boss, Captain Reed, who did not want Mahoney's antics to reflect poorly on his father. Captain Reed told him that they can throw him out, but he cannot quit, and if he does quit, he would be sent to jail. Mahoney tried to get expelled at first, but as he befriended some of the other recruits, he came to love the academy and decided to stay. However, he also ran afoul of Captain Harris and his sidekick Proctor, Captain Mauser, and recruits Copeland and Blankes, all whom disliked his carefree view of life. His knack for getting creative revenge after being humiliated comes into play on several occasions. Despite his womanizing and tendency to break the rules, Mahoney is otherwise a good person willing to go above and beyond to help others regardless of the consequences. Mahoney eventually graduates with an award for bravery in the line of duty. By the third movie, Mahoney is a dedicated officer, who works with and stands up for his cadets and inspires them to work towards achieving their full potential. In the fourth movie, Mahoney successfully lobbies to have two skateboarders, Arnie and Kyle, placed in the Citizens on Patrol program as an alternative to jail time, as they reminded him of what he was like before entering the Academy and how it helped him turn his life around for the better.

Mahoney is also in the animated series, appearing in almost every episode and usually ends up working with Jones. He does not appear in the last three films, and the reason for doing so was never explained in the later films. Steve Guttenberg was offered a role in the fifth film, but he declined, leading the producers to create the character of Nick Lassard as his replacement.

=== Cadet/Off./Sgt./Lt./Capt. Moses Hightower ===
Played by: Bubba Smith
Voiced by: Greg Morton

Featured in all but the seventh film, Hightower was a florist before joining the academy. He is best known for his immense stature and superhuman strength. Hightower practices for his driving test by ripping the front seat out of a compact car (a 1977 Honda Civic owned by Copeland) and steering comfortably from the back seat. However, he is the most humble and soft-spoken of all the characters. Despite his gigantic size, Hightower has sometimes admitted that he lacks self-confidence, such as when he tells Mahoney that he has not driven a car since he was twelve years old, and fears that he will fail out of the police academy if he flunks the driving test. His character often breaks things or uses force to threaten the bad guys. Other examples of him using his strength were when he lifted up the practice squad car with Copeland inside, who had insulted his friend Hooks by calling her a "dumb fat jiggaboo". He can also drop easily into good-cop mode, to gain the trust of crooks he is about to arrest. However, he too graduated from the academy with a decoration for bravery, and eventually made lieutenant after wrestling an alligator, a skill he learned growing up in the bayou, in order to save Harris' life. Hightower also uses German Shepherd police dogs in the 3rd and 4th films, suggesting he got certified as a dog handler.

In the sixth movie, in pursuit of the Wilson Heights Gang, the only time he actually acknowledges himself being angry is when he is almost injured by the largest of the Wilson Heights Gang criminals. When he gets up after having construction-zone items fall on him, Hightower notices that his name pin was displaced and says to himself, "Now I'm mad."

Hightower is also in the series, along with Laverne Hooks. When last seen in the live-action series episode "Dr. Hightower", he has been promoted to the rank of captain, and is presented with the "Alumnus of the Year" award.

=== Cadet/Off./Sgt./Capt. Eugene Tackleberry Sr ===
Played by: David Graf
Voiced by: Dan Hennessey

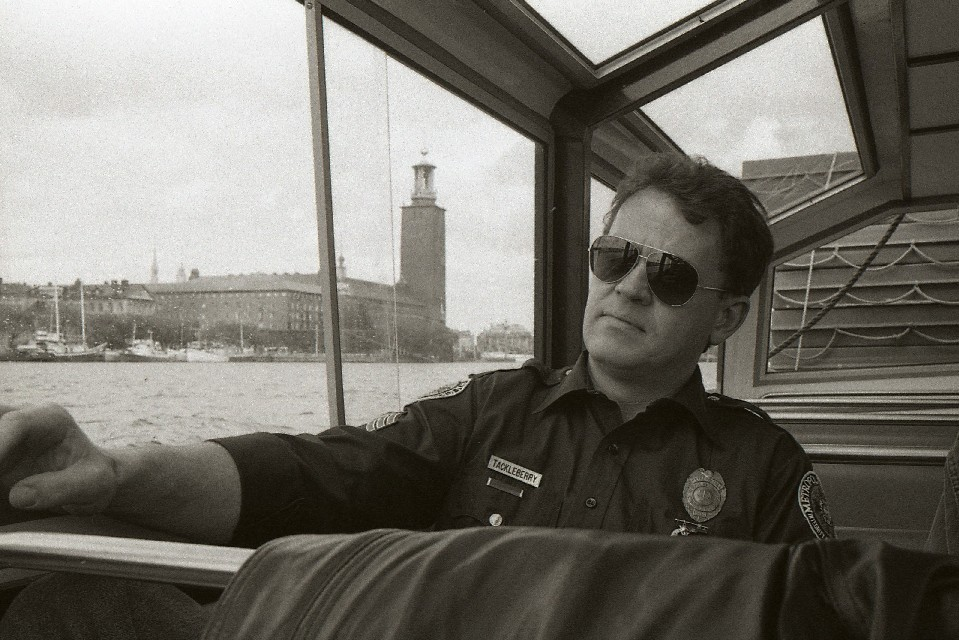
Eugene Tackleberry in Stockholm

Tackleberry is in all seven films and is best known for his love of firearms, the military and direct action. He had been a veteran of the US military and a security guard prior to joining the police academy. He joined the police force to see more action but has a poor grasp of the difference between the military and civilian life. This paramilitary lifestyle was instilled into Tackleberry from home; in the first film, he mentions that his (signature) firearm was given to him by his mother (Harris: "Son, where did you get that gun?" Tackleberry: "My Mom gave it to me."); in the 4th installment, Tackleberry comments that weapons-loving senior citizen, Mrs. Lois Feldman, reminded him of his mother (hinting that his mother may already be dearly departed by this point). Tackleberry is a bit trigger-happy; a tendency which would have had him court-martialed long ago had it not been for the fact that he actually has good aim. Tackleberry was also known for getting the job done, but with overkill and naivete; example being aiding a little old lady who lost her money in a pay phone by shooting it and making a bunch of money fall in his hands, "Can you identify your quarter, Ma'am". Tackleberry also plays the Saxophone very well.

In the second film, which he was assigned to work as a motorcycle policeman, it is revealed that, although Tackleberry exerts an image of toughness and masculinity, he was still a virgin at the age of 28-years-old. However, upon meeting his police partner, a beautiful and equally gun-obsessed woman, Sgt. Kathleen Kirkland (played by Colleen Camp), he falls in love with her. They get married, (driving off in a Bigfoot truck after their wedding), and have a son, Eugene Tackleberry Jr., (featured in the sixth film, played by Daniel Ben Wilson), who is every bit as enthusiastic about all of the same things as his parents. This leads to a series of gags involving the Kirkland family, featuring Eugene's father-in-law and brother-in-law, whose jibes and admonishments are usually punctuated by a good-natured-yet-brutal punch to the jaw; meanwhile, mother and daughter both see the sadistic horseplay as all in good fun.

Tackleberry always carries the biggest side arm he can lay his hands on, usually a .44 Magnum, (his signature sidearm), and has a predilection for using excessively heavy equipment (like a chainsaw for cutting down a tree which a truant boy had fled onto); in the sixth movie, posing undercover as a taxi driver, he scares off a patron trying to hire his cab by brandishing a grenade. He uses military slang such as "affirmative" and "negative", and the military time system. His personal catchphrase is: "...NOW, Mister!" to scare people. In the fifth movie, he went so far as to wade into the ocean off Miami, draw his gun on an invading shark, and order, "Desist, and leave the swimming area NOW, Mister!". He is happiest weighing the benefits of penetration vs. stopping power. Tackleberry is at heart a benevolent person with a tough exterior. He wants to bury his heavy equipment in anyone he encounters; although he did get selfish when he was allowed to test out certain new firearms at the Annual Police Display in Miami, not wanting to share the guns with other officers. He only gave them up when Callahan coaxed him into handing them over, promising Tackleberry that she would "get some of his very own, just as soon as they get home."

This was exacerbated even further in the animated series, where he used a bazooka (a military weapon no police officer would have access to). Tackleberry's bazooka was often used for comical effect rather than destruction: for instance in the opening credits where he uses his bazooka to put the missing dot on the 'i' of the 'police academy' sign after Mahoney remarked it was missing; the collapsing screen serving as transition to the start of the episode. Another example is when working an undercover job as an ice cream salesman, he loads ice cream into his bazooka to cover the escaping crooks in a mess. In the "Team Tack" episode of Police Academy: The Series, Tackleberry was a captain, and mentions his wife Kathleen was one as well. Jones and Tackleberry are the only characters to appear in all of the movies, the animated series and the television series. Also, he is the very first character seen in the first Police Academy film. In the live-action TV series, Tackleberry has 2 nephews, Cadets Dirk & Dean Tackleberry, who idolize him as their role model.

=== Cadet/Off./Sgt. Larvell Jones ===
Played by: Michael Winslow
Voiced by: Greg Morton

Jones was one of the key characters in the series and is famous for making sound effects with his voice. He is one of the characters often remembered from the films, as he uses his vocal ability to make noises to play pranks and deceive both criminals and authority figures. Jones met Mahoney when they were both arrested by cops. Mahoney pulls some strings with Captain Reid to bring Jones with him to the academy. Jones can imitate sounds such as a flat tire, a couple noisily eating fast food, gunfire, and, memorably, a badly dubbed martial arts star. Jones has expertise in martial arts, which he continues to use throughout the series to great success, often mimicking kung fu voice-over, as he does so. Other times he uses his sound-effects ability solely to amuse himself, such as one time at the academy when he imagines himself playing a game of Space Invaders and makes all the known sound effects from that video game. In the sixth movie, he leapt onstage at a nightclub during a blackout (in uniform, declaring, "The Metropolitan Police Department proudly presents... me."), and launched into a string of impressions, thus keeping the audience from rioting. He also has an ability to communicate with parrots, training them to call Captain Harris a "dork". Jones and Tackleberry are the only characters to appear in all of the movies, the animated series and the television series.

The character's vocal ability was an added trait by his actor Michael Winslow, who can make sounds and noises with his voice and mouth in real life. In the animated series, he was partners with Mahoney and in the live action series where he usually visits the academy and help the new cadets out.

=== Cadet/Off. Carl Sweetchuck ===
Played by: Tim Kazurinsky
Voiced by: Howard Morris

Sweetchuck first appeared in the second film, as a shop owner terrorized by Zed and his gang.

In the third film, Sweetchuck decides to join the police force; unfortunately, his former tormentor Zed joins at the same time and in the same class, and the two become mismatched roommates. A stereotypical nerd, Sweetchuck's diminutive size and geeky appearance provided many gags, usually in relation to his physical weakness or as a foil for fellow recruit Zed.

After just a few days, Sweetchuck was unable to take any more of Zed's antics and attempted to leave the academy, but was convinced by Tackleberry to stay. He and Zed eventually got along better as time went on, though Sweetchuck still gets mad at Zed for one thing or the other.

Sweetchuck is in the animated series (along with Zed). He has a brother named Doug. He also becomes Zed's partner in the animated series.

Storefront windows in the first and second film bear the name "Sweedchuk" and "Schewchuk" respectively. Sweetchuck's name is based on that of Police Academy set decorator Steve Shewchuk.

=== Cadet/Off. Zed McGlunk ===
Played by: Bobcat Goldthwait
Voiced by: Dan Hennessey

In the second film, Zed was portrayed as a hyperactive, antisocial gang leader with odd mannerisms, appearance, and taste, but a basically good heart. Many gags are based around Zed's fondness for things that contrast with his wild-man image, such as Family Affair (actually crying at dramatic moments) and Mickey Mouse watches. Another example of his sophomoric behavior was reciting the playground rhyme "Gene, Gene, made a machine" at a formal poetry reading. Zed is almost like a child, admonishing his cronies to "act their age" while they trash a supermarket and thanking the cashier for the "great bargains" (as his gang trundle shopping carts full of food out of the store). When his gang disrupts an anti-crime street fair sponsored by the Mayor, he tells her, "I voted for you!" Zed is arrested at the end of the second film.

In the third film, a reformed Zed (who explains his change of heart by saying, "I used to be a real jerk! But now I'm a people guy!") joins the police force. He often brings trouble to Sweetchuck, who was the subject of harassment during their civilian years. They become roommates while they are both training at the Police Academy, and they manage to get along (to an extent) with each other and in time become friends. Zed suffers from an inability to speak properly and often squeaks or swallows his words. It is also discovered he is immune to the effects of teargas, and apparently even enjoys it. His bad breath and screaming, potent enough to blow down a door, are far more potent weapons than any firearm. He falls in love in the fourth film with Laura, one of the Citizens on Patrol.

Zed is in the animated series (along with Sweetchuck). Several family members make guest appearances: Auntie Bertha, the cousins Ed and Ned, and his hillbilly parents. His surname is McGlunk. In the second film Zed mentions his mother's name was Jughead after Mahoney (undercover) calls himself "Jughead" and says he belongs to a gang called the Archies.

=== Cadet/Off. Thomas "House" Conklin ===
Played by: Tab Thacker
Voiced by: Don Francks

Conklin appeared in movies 4 and 5. He joined the academy first under the COP program in the fourth film, and later became a full-time cop at the start of the fifth film. He is tremendously overweight due to his love of food, and this at times is used as a source of jokes: on the flight to Miami, House changes seats and the plane begins to tilt. When he was a child, Hightower would babysit him and bounce him on his knee: but even the immensely strong Hightower could not recognize the giant House as the same child he once effortlessly lifted. Like Hightower, he is strong, but is not as focused upon it like Hightower.

Conklin appears in the animated series, and he often has Zed and Sweetchuck as his partners. Other times he works with Hooks and Hightower, such as a beach assignment where they go undercover as a civilian family, with House playing the "son" and Hooks and Hightower as the "mom" and "dad".

=== Cadet/Off./Sgt. Laverne Hooks ===
Played by: Marion Ramsey
Voiced by: Denise Pidgeon

Hooks is a diminutive, soft-spoken and unassertive woman with a very high-pitched voice, who often has trouble putting people in line, which continued in the 2nd film. However, she is known for becoming aggressive and authoritative when frustrated or otherwise pushed to her limit, punching people out or pulling her service weapon, screeching the memorable phrase: "Don't move, dirt bag!" The word "dirt bag" is possibly something she inherited from her days in the Police Academy, under the training of then-Lieutenant Harris.

In the third film, Hooks became more confident in herself and is assertive in keeping people in line. She was the first one who quickly figured out that her former classmates, Blankes and Copeland are working with Mauser to shut down the Metropolitan Police Academy to humiliate Lassard, but kept it to herself. Hooks secretly told Cadet Fackler (Debralee Scott) of the men's scheme and making her aware of their plan. Using carefully coded words, they are able to inform Mahoney and the others of the situation with the governor without drawing suspicion to Blankes and Copeland whom were trying to sabotage their efforts. When the men found out too late that Hooks knew the truth of their scheme with Mauser, she knocked out Blankes and Copeland, possibly to pay the latter back for his earlier racist insult. In the fifth film, Hooks is also revealed to be a talented artist, employing this skill as a police sketch artist. In the 6th film, she proves her assertiveness by calling out the attorney for his infractions, including ignoring an officer of the law, tearing up a court summons and parking in a handicapped spot. Hooks proves her point by having his car towed to the impound lot and told the attorney he can have his car back as soon as he paid back the city for his infractions. She appears in the first six films of the franchise and in the animated series. She is seen working with Hightower in the 5th and the 6th films and in the animated series.

=== Sgt./Lt./Capt./D.A. Debbie Callahan ===
Played by: Leslie Easterbrook
Voiced by: Denise Pidgeon

This character is best known for her pure sex appeal, specifically her large breasts, which provided the series with countless sight gags, and penchant for wearing tight fitting clothing. A more serious, grown-up, mature version of Tackleberry, Callahan is portrayed as a stoic, no-nonsense officer who is both physically and sexually aggressive. She along with Harris trained the cadets in the first film, but she does not show the outright hostility towards the cadets that Harris does.

In her role as a teacher to the cadets, she usually gets into situations where after explaining or demonstrating the lesson, she is usually flanked by the male cadets volunteering to be her next test-subject. For example, in the first movie, where she demonstrates self-defense: Leslie Barbara is her test subject, whom she swiftly takes down and sits on his face. When she asks for volunteers, all the male cadets promptly and eagerly volunteer. Another example is in the fourth movie, she teaches a lesson about saving drowning victims, in which she plays the drowning victim: After she dives in the pool, swims to the middle, and surfaces with her breasts showing through her white T-shirt, she asks: "Now, who's going to save me?" Immediately, all the male cadets jump into the pool and swim after her, while she frantically swims away.

She is an avid weightlifter, a martial artist and has a good singing voice. In the first film, she has a relationship with Cadet Martin; in the third and fourth film, she has a relationship with Japanese foreign-exchange cadet, Nogata. She is seen partnered with Tackleberry in the 4th and the 5th films, (keeping him and his gun obsession in line), and in the animated series. She appears in every film except the second, and is promoted to lieutenant and then captain. In the 5th and 6th films, she shows off her martial arts abilities by subduing multiple dirtbags at a single time.

In the Police Academy: The Series episode "Dead Man Talking", Callahan has retired from the Police Force and has been elected District Attorney.

=== Sgt. Nick Lassard ===
Played by: Matt McCoy

Nephew of Eric Lassard (and possibly the son of Capt. Pete Lassard), he appears in the fifth and sixth films. Nick is an officer in the Miami police department in the fifth film where he assumes the role of lead prankster and womanizer, the role held by Mahoney in the previous films. Again assuming this role in the sixth film, he is also portrayed as a skilled gymnast: at the end of Police Academy 6 he escapes injury by swinging on an overpass and landing in a speeding Bigfoot. When the Mastermind took the form of Commissioner Hurst, only Nick wasn't fooled by this and is able to point out the real Hurst from the fake with a Pinocchio test. Mahoney and Nick's characters are very similar, as much as Harris and Mauser, although Lassard shows some more professionalism in his duties, likely respectful of the Lassard family name in law enforcement.

=== Cmndt. Eric Lassard ===
Played by: George Gaynes
Voiced by: Tedd Dillon

Eric Lassard is Commandant, or head, of the Metropolitan Police Academy (sometimes also called the Midcity Police Academy). He is initially not into the politics of the police department. When Chief Hurst and Lieutenant Harris are denouncing the new female mayor's policy change to remove the barriers from academy admissions, he plays along with them and quickly dismisses their comments once they've left the room. A few years later, however, he will initiate a program known as Citizens on Patrol (COP), which is a community outreach course. Lassard featured in all seven films. He is often portrayed as benevolent yet clueless, fond of his pet goldfish and of making many, many long-winded, optimistic speeches about the future of the academy.

=== Lt./Capt. Thaddeus Harris ===
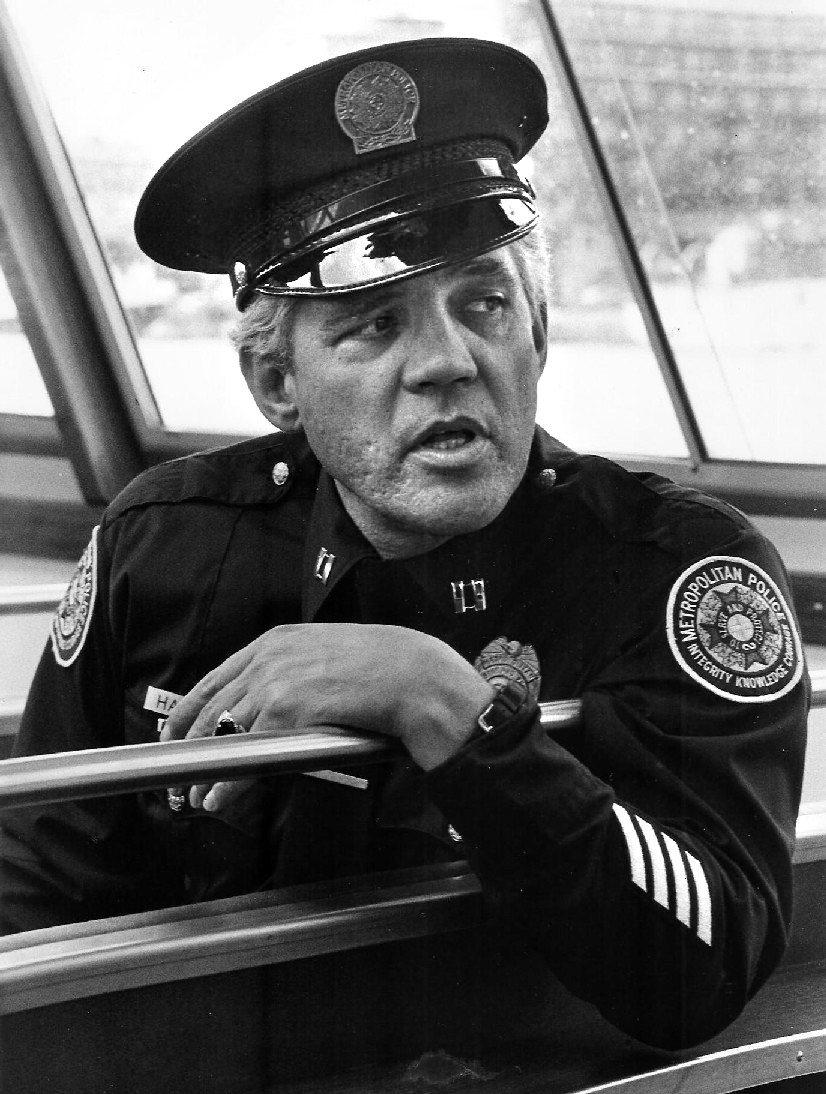
Thaddeus Harris

Played by: G.W. Bailey
Voiced by: Len Carlson

"Mister Nasty" of the police academy, he always attempts to discredit and get rid of Lassard and his men, but ends up being the butt of most of the jokes. Starting with Police Academy 4, he inherits Proctor from Mauser. He generally seems to be success-driven, at the cost of Lassard and his men. Started as lieutenant in the first film but is promoted to captain in other films to come. His catchphrase is: "Move it! Move it! Move it!". He is also deathly afraid of heights, as evidenced in an undercover stakeout in the sixth film, in which his and Proctor's covers are window washers for a high-rise office tower. He derives pleasure from tormenting and belittling his subordinates - first the cadets he instructs at the academy, then Lassard's men whom he outranks. Although he is generally disliked by his colleagues because of his treatment of them, those same people end up rescuing him.

Despite his role as antagonist, some scenes display Harris' genuine desire to see graduates become good cops. His initial dislike of Mahoney is based in part on his belief that he is disrupting the development of people, "who might make pretty good police officers". He heavily favors Blankes and Copeland and recruits them as squad leaders. Later, in the seventh movie, Harris and the rest of the team develop a 'peace' of sorts, with Harris joining them in the rescue attempt of Callahan and providing the team with the necessary equipment to track the criminals. He even demonstrates trust in Tackleberry by requesting he be the one to shoot a locator bullet into the bad guy's car, notably calling him by his nickname "Tack" when doing so.

He works with Proctor in the fourth, fifth, and sixth films and the animated series. In the animated series, Captain Harris is portrayed as gruff but not as sadistic as he was in the movies, and generally more competent. He also seems to take out his dislike of Mahoney through red tape rather than direct action. When Captain Harris was tasked with investigating a string of crimes at the beach, he is also responsible for getting all the officers undercover assignments, to which Mahoney and Jones are assigned to be sanitation workers picking up litter. While Jones accepts his assignment, Mahoney complains that Harris gave them this work to express his dislike of them. A reformed Mauser defends Mahoney and confronts Harris for his actions. He then belittles Harris for taking out his anger on his former cadets out of convenience, rather than disciplinary purposes.

In the animated series episode Police Academy Blues, Harris finally achieves his long-awaited dream of becoming commandant when Lassard is forced to step down, due to the Professor's Supercar being stolen under Lassard's watch. However, Commandant Harris's crowning moment is short-lived, as Mahoney and crew track down and capture the Supercar robbers, ensuring Lassard's reinstatement as commandant, and Harris's demotion to the rank of captain once again.

=== Sgt./Lt./Capt./Cmdr. Carl Proctor ===
Played by: Lance Kinsey
Voiced by: Don Francks

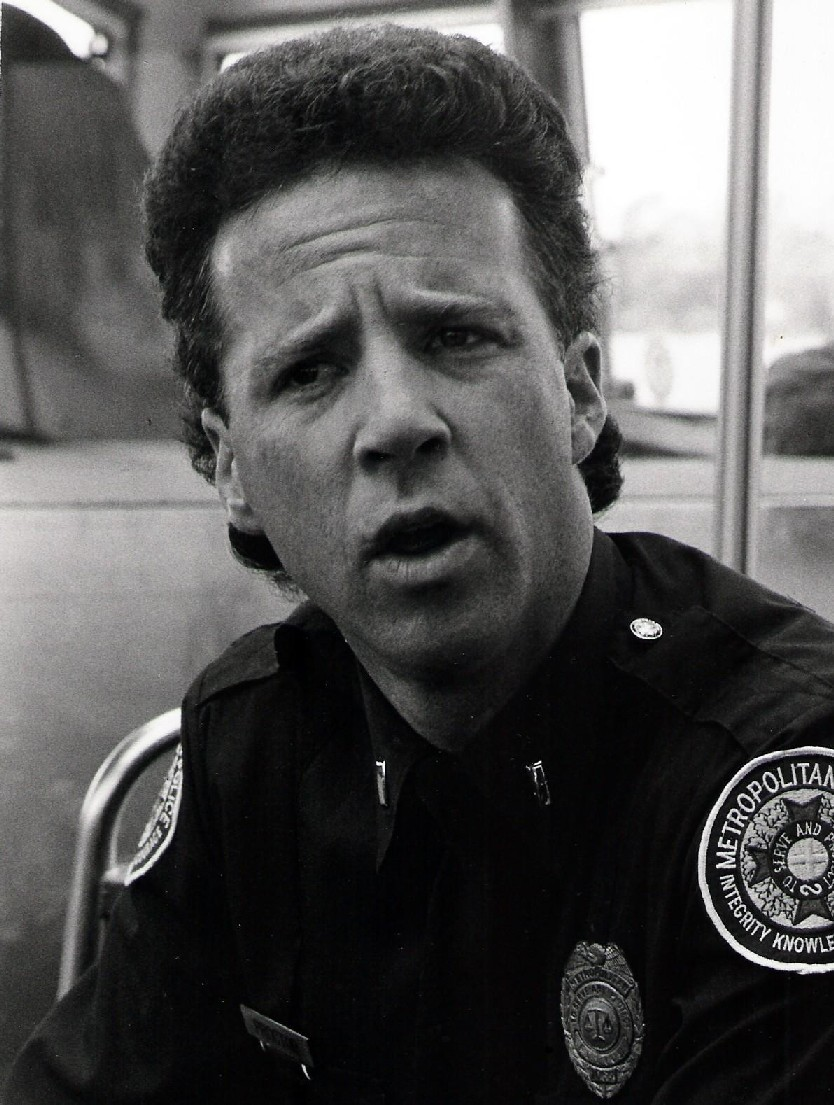
Carl Proctor

Lt. Carl Proctor is a gullible sidekick to Mauser in Police Academy 2 and 3 and Harris in 4, 5 and 6. In his debut in the second movie, he is originally assertive and staunchly supports Mauser but is also a dimwit and in subsequent appearances portrayed even more so. He even disliked Mahoney and his friends and helps Harris or Mauser discredit them. That is why he was part of the butt of Mahoney and his friends pranks on him. In 3, is the second-in-command of Mauser's police academy. Despite losing his job after Mauser's academy is shut down, he gets another job as Captain Harris' underling. Proctor seems to bear the brunt of some of the biggest pranks, such as being lifted by crane while he is inside an outhouse and placed onto the field of a sporting stadium. When Proctor hears the national anthem, he stands up immediately and shocks everyone in the audience. He is generally nicer than Harris or Mauser and is often just following orders, which he mostly manages to screw up. But that is just an act, just like Harris they both think Lassard's men are a joke and mostly he is usually Harris spy to discredit them and throw them off the force. Another aspect of Proctor is his childlike attitude in some adult situations, like when he thought the Blue Oyster Bar was a seafood joint or saying to a bartender, "Could I get a pink—no make it a green—umbrella?" before he introduces himself to a couple of bathing beauties in Florida. Although Proctor has been subject to pranks and slapstick stunts, unlike Harris, he does not appear to show a vicious attitude towards Mahoney and his friends, either because he is too stupid to realize Mahoney was behind the pranks or he is very forgiving. In Police Academy 5, it is revealed that he and Harris are related through the marriage of Proctor's sister and Harris' nephew. He also appears along with Harris in the animated series, in which Proctor is temporarily promoted to Acting Captain in one episode, due to Harris being hospitalized.

=== Lt./Capt./Cmndt./Sheriff Ernie Mauser ===
Played by: Art Metrano
Voiced by: Rex Hagon

Mauser (or Meiser in the series; Bouser in the animated series) is a similar character to Harris, and his role in the movies is essentially the same. Playing a ruthless and demeaning, success-driven officer, Mauser is often the butt of many of the jokes played by Lassard's men. His lackey is Proctor. He appears in Police Academy 2 and 3. In Police Academy 2, he tricks his way into becoming Captain of the Precinct. In the end of the movie, he was demoted back to lieutenant and Pete Lassard was back as captain, since Pete, Mahoney and his friends finally put away Zed's vicious gang behind bars and Pete was reinstated as captain. In Police Academy 3, he is the Commandant of the rival police academy and took advantage of Blankes and Copeland's desire to seek revenge on Lassard for graduating at the bottom of their class. His police academy is eventually dismantled by the state government as his cadets prove to be far less responsive to actual emergencies than Lassard's men.

However, in the animated series, Mauser becomes a good character and is head of the K9 Corps. His attitude towards Mahoney and the others improves drastically. Mauser's attitude towards Harris is similar to Hurst's (in the later films), in that he points out his flaws and belittles Harris for his behavior. Due to Art Metrano's accident in 1989 that left him partially paralyzed, Mauser, now a wheelchair user and County Sheriff, makes his final appearance in the 1997 live-action series episode "Hoop Nightmares". In this episode, it is revealed that Mauser was once a good friend of Eric Lassard's successor, Stuart Hefilfinger, but Mauser apparently harbors some resentment towards Stuart for getting the position of Academy Commandant that Mauser wanted. This episode also finally answers the question of Mauser's first name - Ernie.

== Supporting ==
=== Cadet Leslie Barbara ===
Played by: Donovan Scott

Leslie Barbara is an overweight guy who cannot stand up for himself. He only appears in the first film. Barbara is constantly the victim of extreme practical jokes by a group of bullies who drive an old Mack Teskey truck. At the start of the first film, Barbara and the photo hut he works in (shaped like a camera) are thrown off a bridge into a river. He declares revenge as he is joining the police academy. He has a dog named Princess, who was seen earlier humping Lassard's leg (due to her not being spayed) and causing the then Lt. Harris to confiscate the dog. However, at the academy, Barbara is still subject to some intimidation, mainly from Blankes and Copeland, who try to force Barbara into revealing that Mahoney is hosting a party without authorization. Mahoney senses he's being set up by both Blankes and Copeland and falsely tells him the party is at the Blue Oyster Bar. While at the academy, Barbara eventually learns how to stand up for himself and develops self-defense skills. This comes in handy twice. The first time was against two of his tormenters, Blankes and Copeland. Having enough of their misconduct towards Mahoney by taunting him into fighting them so they can give Harris a reason to expel him, Barbara stands up for him. He takes them by surprise in throwing the first punch by hitting Copeland in the face with a metal lunch tray. After he faints, Blankes got offended and punched Barbara in the face for foiling them, resulting in a fight between Blankes and Mahoney. The second time was during the city riot at the end of the film when he finally faces the bullies who tormented him before becoming a cop, who taunts him again and prepare to attack Barbara. However, he is able to fend them off and put them on their backs. After the fight, Barbara demands the gang return the furniture from the truck back into the house from which they were taking it from and leave. The ringleader soon tells him that the furniture is theirs and were actually moving away from town because of the riot. Barbara mutters, "Oh, sorry", leaves looking a little guilty, but then smiles, with a "sweet revenge" look in his eyes. He is last seen comforting Tackleberry for missing the action.

=== Cadet/Sgt. Kyle Blankes ===
Played by: Brant von Hoffman

Along with Copeland, he is often the comic foil for Mahoney and the other officers. He only appears in the first and third films. He and Copeland are Harris' favorites and he designated them as squad leaders. It was implied that Blankes was also intimidated by Hightower and is seen walking away whistling as the more fearful Copeland got inside the squad car. Just like Proctor, he was Harris and Mauser spies and want to make sure they do whatever it takes to get rid of Lassard's men off the force and discredit them. Like Copeland, Blankes was tricked into going to the Blue Oyster Bar by Mahoney in order to keep them away from the party at the beach. He would wind up there a second time by accident when he and Copeland were trying to avoid rioters after a dangerous thug stole their revolvers. Blankes and Copeland willingly helped Mauser to humiliate Lassard's academy as an attempt at revenge because they graduated at the bottom of their class. One of their schemes was to embarrass Hooks, who was on duty as dispatcher, to sabotage her GPS by turning it into a game of Paperboy. However, Hooks was no fool and she caught on to their scheme quickly. Unbeknownst to them, she and Cadet Fackler were using secret coded words to help Mahoney and the others get to the Governor before Mauser did. Realizing too late she pretended to be fooled, both Blankes and Copeland were knocked out with one double-punch by Hooks.

=== Cadet Kyle Connors ===
Played by: Charlie Schlatter

A cadet whose acrophobia is well known, Kyle Connors only appears in Mission to Moscow. Due to not coming top in his class and failing in his training due to his acrophobia (despite his aspiration to follow in his father and grandfather's footsteps as a Police Officer), he cheated his way into Commandant Lassard's team when he learned it would be heading to Russia. He seems to have been intended as a replacement for Carey Mahoney and Nick Lassard as the lead womanizer, in spite of being somewhat younger than his predecessors. He does have excellent computer skills.

=== Cadet/Sgt. Chad Copeland ===
Played by: Scott Thomson

Chad Copeland starts out as a cadet in the first film, and in his subsequent appearances moves further up the ranks. Upon meeting Hightower the first time at the academy, Copeland immediately is intimidated by him after an earlier (albeit racist) comment he made with Blankes. Initially chosen with Blankes as a cadet leader for Harris' team at the Academy to spy on Mahoney and his friends to get them off the force and discredit them. Copeland is portrayed as a bigot several times in the first movie. He makes a racial insult at Hooks for accidentally running over his feet by calling her "a dumb, fat jigaboo". His intimidation for Hightower grew when he comes down the steps offended by the racial insult enough to flip the car over with Copeland inside (despite Harris and Hooks' pleas to stop). He stays on with the Metropolitan Police, and (with Blankes again) attempts to sabotage Lassard's academy under the guidance of Commandant Mauser. Surprisingly, even though his antics of sabotage were found out by Sgt. Hooks and Cadet Fackler, he is still kept on the force. His attitude on the police beat is that of being overly strict, and tends to antagonize people akin to Captain Harris' attitude. Just like Proctor, he was Harris and Mauser spies and want to make sure they do whatever it takes to get rid of Lassard's men off the force and dis-credit them. He is often fooled into walking into the gay bar, The Blue Oyster. He appears in the first, third and fourth films, and makes a guest appearance in the animated series, as Proctor's assistant in the episode "Proctor, Call A Doctor", and makes a cameo appearance in the episode "Grads On Tour". Like Harris and Mauser, Copeland has also shown contempt for Mahoney, evident when he takes an off-beat approach to handle situations. Near the end of the first movie, Barbara took everyone by surprise and threw the first punch by hitting Copeland in the face with a lunch tray. He is bewildered and confused by Barbara's actions for a few seconds, before fainting. Copeland was later taken by surprise for the second time by Hooks who decked both him and Blankes with a double one punch (possibly to pay Copeland back for the earlier racial insult he made about her).

=== Cadet/Off./Sgt. Douglas Fackler ===
Played by: Bruce Mahler

Bespectacled, mild-mannered and accident-prone police officer, who unknowingly causes injury and havoc to just about everyone and everything in his path. In the first film, he unknowingly starts a chain reaction of events when he discards an apple which hits a biker, causing the biker to accuse a rival gang member (who is holding a bag of apples) of hitting him, which ignites a fight, then culminates into a riot. He appears in the first, second, third, and sixth movies. He is seen driving a station wagon to register at the police academy in the first film, where his wife, Violet, climbs on the hood to discourage him, but he drives with her outside. In a parody of the scene with his wife's reluctance to let him be a policeman, he shows similar opposition to his wife joining the new recruits in the third film, by jumping on the hood of his squad car and riding it from their home to the police academy.

He does not appear in the animated series.

=== Mrs./Cadet Violet Fackler ===
Played by: Debralee Scott

She is the beautiful wife of Douglas Fackler and fiercely opposes her husband's plans to join the police force in the first movie, including attempting to stop his car going to the police academy in any way possible, but Douglas becomes a cop anyway. In the third film, Violet decides to join the academy and becomes a cadet, and now her husband tries to stop her from doing this. She and Hooks cotton onto Blankes and Copeland's involvement with Mauser. After Hooks knocks them out, she tells Violet to inform Mahoney and the other officers where the Governor is being held hostage.

Like her husband, Violet doesn't appear in the animated series.

=== Police Chief/Comm./Cmndt. Henry J. Hurst ===
Played by: George R. Robertson

Initially chief of police, Henry Hurst is later promoted to commissioner. Initially, he is opposed to the new rules from the mayor that the Police Academy should be open to all people, regardless of age, sex, physical ability, etc., sharing the same disgust as the then-Lt. Harris. He comes up with a plan to make all cadets quit by weeding out those who are over the age, obese, too muscular, etc. and orders both Harris and Lassard (who is against it) to implement them. However, after the initial successes of Lassard's academy graduates, he grows to love and respect them, and goes around to special events to promote Lassard's academy and the Metropolitan Police. He is a fair man, but is usually annoyed by Harris or Mauser's antics and does not like to be taken for a ride. He sometimes appears concerned about Commandant Lassard's behavior. Over the course of the story, he develops from an attitude of intolerance to acceptance and wisdom. Because of his acquired wisdom, he can usually point out people whose actions are phony or genuine: In the case of Capts. Mauser and Harris, he usually points out what their intentions are and belittles them for their actions, mainly because both men like to kiss up to him (more prominent with Mauser, while Harris takes a more antagonistic approach).

He does not appear in the animated series, but is substituted by another chief of police. In the live-action series episode, "Cadet of the Year", budget cuts force Commissioner Hurst to take over as commandant of the Police Academy.

=== Cadet/Officer Bud Kirkland ===
Played by: Andrew Paris

Bud is Kathleen's younger brother who enjoys boxing and was on the high school championships. He continued boxing with his father, and they are constantly punching each other out. He appears as a high school graduate in the second film, a cadet in the third film, and an officer in the fourth film; here, he is against his father joining the C.O.P. (Citizens On Patrol) program, citing that, with three members of the family in the police force, it might look like favouritism if he joined too, albeit still as citizens; his father, however, believes that Bud's reluctance for him to join C.O.P. is because he thinks that his father cannot 'cut it'.

Andrew Paris is the real-life son of actor-turned-director Jerry Paris, who directed the second and third films.

=== Off./Sgt./Lt./Capt. Kathleen Kirkland-Tackleberry ===
Played by: Colleen Camp

Kathleen Tackleberry (née Kirkland) is the female version of Eugene Tackleberry: She is a gun fanatic with authoritarian, militaristic manners. She and Tackleberry first meet in the second film, and she's his new partner in motorcycle duty; they first meet, fall in love, and eventually get married, all in the 2nd film. In the 4th film, they're seen attending dinner with her family. In the 6th film, Police Academy 6: City Under Siege, although she isn't seen, it's revealed that she and Eugene now have a son, Eugene Tackleberry, Jr., who's as weapons-happy as his parents (he has his very-own police baton).

In Police Academy: The Series, Tackleberry mentions that he was promoted to captain alongside his wife.

=== Eugene Tackleberry, Jr. ===
Played by: Daniel Ben Wilson

Eugene Tackleberry Jr. is the son of Eugene Tackleberry Sr. and Kathleen Tackleberry (née Kirkland), and a gun fanatic/weapons-happy as his parents (he has his very-own police baton), just like his parents. He appears only in the sixth film, Police Academy 6: City Under Siege.

=== Capt. Pete Lassard ===
Played by: Howard Hesseman

Captain Pete Lassard, brother of Cmndt. Eric Lassard (and possibly the father of Sgt. Nick Lassard), appears as the captain of the 16th Precinct from the second film. This precinct is where the new academy graduates are first posted. Like his brother he is very dedicated to his work and genuinely tries to make the city a safer place to live. After budget cuts and having to deal with old and tired squad members he requests aid from his brother and receives six of his best graduates to help out. He's not opposed to going bare-knuckle against hoodlums, but once got trapped and subsequently spray painted and given a new hairdo by Zed's gang. He hasn't carried live ammo since 1973 apparently.

=== Cadet George Martin ===
Played by: Andrew Rubin

George Martin appears only in the first Police Academy movie. When the movie begins he seems to be a Hispanic heartthrob with a gift for attracting hordes of women. But later in the movie it is revealed that he is fourth generation American of a Spanish-speaking family and actually speaks in an American accent, but plays-up a Spanish accent and changes the pronunciation of his name, (he would pronounce his last name Mar-teen) to get girls. By the end of the first film he would be involved with Callahan.

=== Cadet/Officer Tomoko Nogata ===
Played by: Brian Tochi

He is a Japanese cadet who features in the third and fourth films. "Tomoko" is normally a woman's name in Japanese. Initially a member of Mauser's cadets, he is sent to Lassard's academy almost immediately, due to his "oddities". Once there, he grows attracted to Sgt. Callahan, and the two enter into a relationship. In the fourth movie he appear as an officer of the Japanese police in a congress in London, and later goes with Commandant Lassard to the Academy, where again he gets involved with Callahan.

=== Officer Vinnie Schtulman ===
Played by: Peter Van Norden

An easygoing, overweight policeman who is always eating, not even minding if a candy bar fell on the ground. Officer Schtulman owns a dog, Lou and a cat, which often accompanies him on duty. Schtulman also seems to think throwing a tennis ball to his dog in a busy traffic tunnel is the same as in open rural areas. He becomes Carey Mahoney's first partner in the second film.

=== Cadet Karen Thompson ===
Played by: Kim Cattrall

She is a bored socialite who joins the police force to broaden her horizons and meet people "who aren't like her and her mother." She tells Mahoney that she wants to be a cop because: "I like to dress like a man." She appears only in the first movie. Thompson is best friends with Laverne Hooks and is the only one who understands the soft-spoken woman. She's also Mahoney's first love interest.

== Antagonists ==
=== Unnamed Main Antagonist/Ax Murderer ===
Played by: Doug Lennox

The main antagonist of the first film who was seen in a leather jacket, a T-shirt that says Vassar, beanie and jeans. He was first seen at the end of the open gate, while Blankes and Copeland were busy antagonizing his gang of thugs. Once they got at the end, the man comes out and takes the revolvers out of their hands, forcing Blankes and Copeland on the run from him. The man and his thugs takes Lt. Harris hostage and Mahoney attempts a rescue. It goes awry and the man takes him as a 2nd hostage. He is foiled by Hightower when he fooled him into believing he is a tough thug wanting to help out his fellow criminal. After being knocked out, the man tries to kill Hightower by pulling his own revolver. However, he is easily apprehended by Hooks through a back door to the place Harris and Mahoney are being held hostage.

Credited as "Ax Murderer" in the third film, he is also one of the suspects seen in the police line-up at the 16th Precinct. He is later shown to be the leader of the criminal gang responsible for Governor Neilson's kidnapping at the charity regatta. One of the members of his gang is his mother. He engages the Academy grads in a dramatic boat chase across the harbour, but gets put in his place by Hooks once again.

=== Mack Teskey Truck Gang ===
Played by Marco Bianco (ringleader), Ted Hanlan, F. Braun McAsh and Rob Watson

The gang who are minor antagonists in the first film, but play a role in it. They first appeared in the Teskey Truck they drive in and bully Leslie Barbara due to him having two feminine names. They take him and the photo hut that is shaped like a camera and throw them overboard. They would meet up near the end of the film. Despite the gang's attempts to intimidate him again, Barbara stands up for himself and fights them off. After putting them on their backs, Barbara demanded that the gang return the furniture back in the apartment and leave. The ringleader reveals it's their furniture and were actually packing their own things to move away from town because of the riots. Barbara briefly apologizes and leaves the men on their backs.

=== Tony ===
Played by: René Auberjonois

=== Mouse ===
Played by: Archie Hahn

=== Sugar ===
Played by: Jerry Lazarus

=== Ace ===
Played by: Gerrit Graham

Wilson Heights Gang Member: Ace is an ace when it comes to guns. He is the team's gun specialist opposite to Tackleberry. Ace seems to act like a ladies' man as he seems to acknowledge himself to his female hostages, for example during the bank robbery asking a female "where are you from originally?" Although skilled he is captured by Tackleberry after they both show skill in firearms.

=== Flash ===
Played by: Brian Seeman

Flash is the team's martial artist and acrobat and possibly the team's demolitionist, such proof of him using dynamite and a remote bomb in the power plant. He fights Jones in hand-to-hand combat and proves to have equal skill and strength. Although he wins the fight he is defeated by the shock of Jones imitating a cyborg. Stunned due to this fear, he gets knocked out and apprehended by Jones.

=== Ox ===
Played by: Darwyn Swalve

Ox is the team's muscle and not the most threatening of the team since he takes a calm approach in robberies even asking politely for either the keys or information. Although he is the least dangerous, he was a considerable opponent when he tried to stop Hightower. Due to the amazing strength of both men, they remain for a time in a standoff akin to Indian wrestling until he tells a childish knock-knock joke, to which Hightower replies he draws the line at bad puns and throws Ox to the ground. Hightower then restrains Ox by handcuffing him to a chain link fence, which Ox, despite his strength, does not attempt to break, arguably dismayed over losing the fight.

=== The Mayor / The Mastermind ===
Played by: Kenneth Mars

The Mayor/Mastermind begins a string of crime waves to devalue a part of town that has a high value due to the businesses on that street. He hires three slightly dimwitted henchmen who have certain traits such as strength and agility. He creates plans for small-time robberies and hides his involvement in it.

When he is first introduced as the Mayor, he is furious after the news article detailing the latest robbery done by the Wilson Heights gang. The mayor quickly reprimands Harris for his precinct's slow response and also Hurst for not being strict with the former. Despite trying to argue their case, he points out that because of both Harris and Hurst's slow response, everyone thinks he's incompetent with his job and are leaving town. Under threat by the governor with revocation if he doesn't stop the crime wave and bring the Wilson Heights gang into custody, the Mayor orders them to work with Commandant Lassard and his team to stop the crime wave.

As the Mastermind, he detonates a power plant to send the city into chaos. During this time, crime in the blackout intensifies from local hoods to riots. Once discovered, he tries to eliminate Sgt. Lassard in his hideout before escaping. He commandeers a power utility truck equipped with a cherry picker which Lassard hops aboard to pursue Mastermind. During the chase through the darkened streets, Mastermind takes control of the Basket Override and tries to either kill Lassard or knock him off. During the bridge development Mastermind tries once more to kill Lassard by trying to knock his head off with the bridge, but fails due to Lassard's gymnastic skills.

Once the chase ends, they head into a building which houses Hurst's office. In this scene, he takes the form of Hurst in order to fool his pursuers. However, Sgt. Lassard isn't fooled and is able to point out the real Hurst from the fake with a Pinocchio test. Once it is discovered that he was the mayor, he confesses to Harris' unwitting involvement as his informant and the billions of dollars he could've made from his scam. The Mayor's title is revoked and he is arrested along with his henchmen.

=== Konstantin Konali ===
Played by: Ron Perlman

== Other ==
=== Professor ===
Voiced by: Howard Morris

He is a genial scientist. He appears only in the animated series.

=== Auntie Bertha ===
She is Zed's aunt. She appears only in the animated series, along with the cousins Ed and Ned. In the episode "Little Zed & Big Bertha" they are criminals, but in the episode "Wheels of Fortune" they become cops.

=== Captain Reed ===
Played by: Ted Ross

A senior police officer and old friend of Mahoney's father, Reed made his ultimatum clear for him to straighten up by going to the academy or face jail time. When he found out about Mahoney's scheme to perform terribly and get himself expelled as a loophole, he made a deal with Lassard as means to make him stay there full term. Reed was there and was happy at Mahoney's change and commend Capt. Harris for helping turn him around.
