= Police Academy: The Series =

American-Canadian TV sitcom (1997–1998)

- Title card
- Genre: Sitcom; Police comedy
- Created by: Paul Maslansky
- Based on: Police Academy characters by Neal Israel & Pat Proft
- Developed by: Gerald Sanoff
- Starring: Matt Borlenghi; Tony Longo; Rod Crawford; Christine Gonzales; Toby Proctor; Heather Campbell; Jeremiah Birkett; P. J. Ochlan; Joe Flaherty; Michael Winslow
- Theme music composer: Ari Wise; Jim Guttridge
- Composer: Hal Beckett
- Countries of origin: United States; Canada
- Original language: English
- No. of seasons: 1
- No. of episodes: 26

Production
- Executive producers: Paul Bronfam; Steven S. Levitan; Paul Maslansky; Gary Goodman; Barry Rosen
- Running time: 60 minutes
- Production companies: Paul Maslansky Productions; Goodman/Rosen Productions; Protocol Entertainment; Warner Bros. International Television Production

Original release
- Network: Syndicated (US); CTV (Canada)
- Release: September 22, 1997 – May 25, 1998

Police Academy: The Series is a sitcom series that was a spin-off sequel to the Police Academy series of films. Michael Winslow was the only actor from the Police Academy films to have a recurring role on the show, although several of the film's cast made occasional guest appearances. The series was written by Paul Maslansky and produced by James Margellos and Gary M. Goodman and aired in syndication from September 27, 1997, until May 23, 1998.

== Cast ==
- Matt Borlenghi as Cadet Richard Casey (26 episodes), who is similar to Carey Mahoney and Nick Lassard. Like Mahoney, Casey is a repeat offender who chose the Academy instead of jail.
- Rod Crawford as Sergeant Rusty Ledbetter (19 episodes), who is similar to Harris and Mauser; he wants to discredit Casey and his friends to get them thrown out of the academy.
- Toby Proctor as Cadet Dirk Tackleberry (20 episodes) who is a nephew of Eugene Tackleberry, who is Dirk's idol.
- Jeremiah Birkett as Cadet Dean Tackleberry (20 episodes) who is a nephew of Eugene Tackleberry, who is Dean's idol.
- Heather Campbell as Cadet Annie Metford (20 episodes)
- Christine Gonzales as Alicia Conchita Montoya Cervantes (17 episodes)
- Tony Longo as Cadet Luke Kackley (19 episodes) who is similar to House Conklin and Moses Hightower.
- P. J. Ochlan as Cadet Lester Shane (20 episodes), who is similar to Proctor; as Ledbetter's assistant, he spies on Casey and his friends in an attempt to discredit them and throw them out of the academy.
- Joe Flaherty as Commandant Hefilfinger (20 episodes) who is similar to Eric Lassard; he is Lassard's successor as head of the academy.
- Michael Winslow as Sergeant Larvell Jones (13 episodes)

=== Recurring cast ===
- Larke Miller as Kendall Jackson (14 episodes)
- Tanya Wright as Cassandra Cunningham (7 episodes)

=== Guest stars ===
- Leslie Easterbrook as District Attorney Debbie Callahan (episode 5)
- Kenneth Mars as Dr. Quackenbush (episode 9), who played a central role as the Mayor in Police Academy 6: City Under Siege
- Art Metrano as Mauser (named in this show as Sheriff Meiser) (episode 14)
- George Gaynes as Commandant Eric Lassard (episode 15)
- Bubba Smith as Captain Moses Hightower (episode 16)
- Dom DeLuise as The voice of Zeus (episode 17)
- David Graf as Captain Eugene Tackleberry (episode 21)
- Colleen Camp appears as Sergeant Kathleen Kirkland-Tackleberry through archive footage (episode 21)
- George R. Robertson as Commissioner Hurst (episode 22)
- Tim Kazurinsky as Arnold Fliegel (episode 23), who played Carl Sweetchuck in the second through fourth installments of the film series.

== Episodes ==
No.	Title	Directed by	Written by	Original release date
1	"Is Only Academy"	Mark Jean	Gerald Sanoff	September 22, 1997
2	"Put Down That Nose"	Burt Brinckerhoff	Kathy Slevin	September 29, 1997
3	"Ain't Nothin' But a Hound"	Jim Drake	Simon Muntner	October 6, 1997
4	"Two Men and a Baby"	Jim Drake	Howard Nemetz	October 13, 1997
5	"Dead Man Talking"	Ray Austin	Doug Molitor	October 20, 1997
6	"Mummy Dearest"	Mark Jean	Michael Gleason	October 27, 1997
7	"No Sweat, Sweet"	Burt Brinckerhoff	Howard Nemetz	November 3, 1997
8	"All at Sea"	Tibor Takacs	Michael Sloan	November 10, 1997
9	"Les Is More"	Mark Jean	Eva Almos	November 17, 1997
10	"If I Were a Rich Cop"	Ray Austin	Kathy Slevin	November 24, 1997
11	"Shopping with the Enemy"	Tibor Takacs	Kathy Slevin	December 1, 1997
12	"Luke...Warm"	Donald Shebib	Dan Wilcox	January 26, 1998
13	"The Truth Ain't What It Used to Be"	Donald Shebib	Alan Moskowitz & Scott Redman	February 2, 1998
14	"Hoop Nightmares"	Ray Austin	Alan Daniels	February 9, 1998
15	"Lend Me Your Ears"	Mark Jean	Alan Moskowitz & Scott Redman	February 16, 1998
16	"Dr. Hightower"	Christopher Hibler	Bill Taub	February 23, 1998
17	"Bring Me the Turtle of Commandant Hefilfinger"	Mark Jean	Alan Moskowitz & Scott Redman	March 2, 1998
18	"Karate Cops"	Allan Harmon	Kathy Slevin	March 30, 1998
19	"A Horse of Course"	Ray Austin	Alan Schwartz	April 6, 1998
20	"Mr. I.Q."	Donald Shebib	Michael Gleason	April 13, 1998
21	"Team Tack"	Robert Radler	John Wayne Topping	April 20, 1998
22	"Cadet of the Year"	Ray Austin	Rick Drew	April 27, 1998
23	"Got Insurance?"	Mark Jean	Alan Moskowitz & Scott Redman	May 4, 1998
24	"Angel on My Back"	Ron Oliver	Michael Gleason	May 11, 1998
25	"Lend Me Your Neck"	Ron Oliver	Michael Gleason	May 18, 1998
26	"Rich No More"	Gary M. Goodman	Alan Daniels	May 25, 1998
