= David Graf =

American actor (1950–2001)

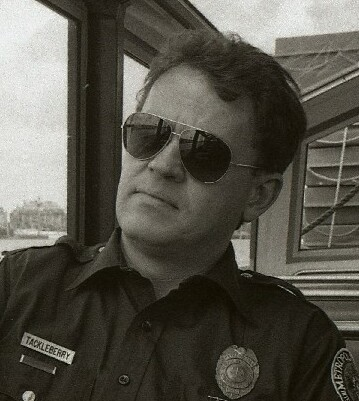
- Graf in 1989
- Born: Paul David Graf; April 16, 1950; Lancaster, Ohio, U.S.
- Died: April 7, 2001 (aged 50); Phoenix, Arizona, U.S.
- Resting place: Forest Rose Cemetery
- Occupation: Actor
- Years active: 1981–2001
- Spouse: Kathryn Graf (m. 1983)
- Children: 2

Paul David Graf (April 16, 1950 – April 7, 2001) was an American actor, best known for his role as Sgt. Eugene Tackleberry in the Police Academy series of films.

== Early life and education ==
Graf was born in Lancaster, Ohio and graduated from Lancaster High School in 1968. He studied theatre at Otterbein College in Westerville, a suburb of Columbus, Ohio, where he graduated in 1972. He attended graduate school at The Ohio State University until 1975, when he dropped out to pursue his acting career.

== Acting career ==
Graf made his first television appearance as a contestant on the game show The $20,000 Pyramid in December 1979, where he teamed with actress Patty Duke. He would later appear on subsequent versions of the show as a celebrity contestant, twice with Duke. As a struggling actor in the early 1980s, he also took small roles in popular TV shows, including M*A*S*H, The Dukes of Hazzard, Airwolf, Hardcastle and McCormick and The A-Team.

He made his film debut in 1981 when he played Gergley in the drama Four Friends. Graf later played the trigger-happy Eugene Tackleberry in the 1984 comedy Police Academy, and starred in each of the sequels. In 1986, Graf had a role as Councilman Harlan Nash on the short-lived sitcom He's the Mayor. In 1990, Graf appeared in the final two episodes of the series Beauty and the Beast. In 1992, Graf returned to play a minor role as a police officer again for the comedy series Seinfeld during its fourth-season episode "The Ticket" and also appeared on Night Court. He played Tackleberry for the final time in a guest appearance on the short-lived Police Academy: The Series. Also in November 1992, Graf appeared on Family Matters where he played Sgt. Shiska.

Graf made various guest appearances following his role in the Police Academy series, including a recurring role in The West Wing, several appearances in Star Trek: Voyager episode ("The 37s") and Star Trek: Deep Space Nine. In the latter series, he played a Klingon called Leskit in the fifth-season episode "Soldiers of the Empire".

Graf was Lt. Weismann in the movie Suture in 1993 and Ralph Brinker in the Disney Channel movie Brink! in 1998.

Graf made a guest appearance in an episode of the short-lived ABC sitcom Teen Angel as a camp leader for Steve Beauchamp's little sister Katie, in the 1997–1998 season. In 2000, he made an appearance on The Amanda Show as a paramedic who accidentally swapped pagers with Amanda Bynes. He also made an appearance on Lois and Clark: The New Adventures of Superman season 2 episode 20 as a reporter for the Daily Planet.

Graf had a small role in 1995's The Brady Bunch Movie, portraying Alice's boyfriend Sam Franklin, the butcher. In 1996, Graf made a guest appearance in Promised Land, which was a spinoff of Touched by an Angel. He played the role of a grieving husband whose wife died while working for a company and he went there trying to find answers to her death.

Graf guest starred in several episodes of ABC's sitcom Step By Step in the 1990s. He also starred in the second episode of the third season of ABC's Home Improvement as angler Chuck Norwood. Some of his last acting performances were two guest appearances as The Pentagon staff member Colonel Chase in the series The West Wing ("The Drop-In" and "The Portland Trip") and as Jacques Douche in the Son of the Beach TV series episode "Grand Prix". Graf's last acting role was the Nickelodeon sitcom The Amanda Show, just three months before his death.

== Screen Actors Guild ==
Besides his acting, Graf was a representative of the Screen Actors Guild. As well as serving as a Hollywood union rep, he was on SAG's national board, TV-theatrical steering committee, and national disciplinary review committee. Graf sought fair treatment for his fellow actors and actresses, which included efforts for better working conditions for the acting community.

== Personal life ==
Graf married Kathryn Graf in 1983. They had two sons.

== Death ==
While attending his brother-in-law's wedding in Phoenix, Arizona, on April 7, 2001, Graf died from a sudden heart attack at the age of 50. He is buried at Forest Rose Cemetery in Lancaster, Ohio.

== Filmography ==
Year	Title	Role	Notes
1981	Four Friends	Gergley	
1981	The Dukes of Hazzard	Maury	Season 3, Ep. 22 "The Canterbury Crock"
1982	M*A*S*H	Lt. Spears	Season 10, Ep. 14 "A Holy Mess"
1983	Voyagers	Sgt. Mike	Season 1, Ep. 14 "Sneak Attack"
1983	The A-Team	Cooper	Season 2, Ep. 4 "Bad Time on the Border"
1984	Police Academy	Cadet Eugene Tackleberry	
1984	Irreconcilable Differences	Bink	
1984	Airwolf	Billie	Season 2, Ep. 1 "Sweet Britches"
1985	Police Academy 2: Their First Assignment	Sgt. Eugene Tackleberry	
1986	Police Academy 3: Back in Training	Sgt. Eugene Tackleberry	
1987	Police Academy 4: Citizens on Patrol	Sgt. Eugene Tackleberry	
1987	Love at Stake	Nathaniel	
1987	Night Court	Horace "Hondo" Jenkins	Season 5, episode 6 "Mac's Dilemma"
1988	Police Academy 5: Assignment Miami Beach	Sgt. Eugene Tackleberry	
1989	Police Academy 6: City Under Siege	Sgt. Eugene Tackleberry	
1990	The Outsiders	Jake	Season 1, Episode 13 "Union Blues"
1990	Elvis	Bob Neal (promoter)	4 episodes
1991	Without a Pass	White Officer - 1990	
1991	Quantum Leap	Sheriff Nolan	Season 3, Ep 16 "Southern Comforts"
1992	Family Matters	Sergeant Shishka	1 episode
1992	Seinfeld	Cop #2	1 episode
1993	American Kickboxer 2	Howard	
1993	For Their Own Good	Miles	
1993	Suture	Lt. Weismann	
1993	Home Improvement	Chuck Norwood	Season 3 Ep.2 "Aisle See You in My Dreams"
1994	Guarding Tess	Lee Danielson	
1994	Police Academy: Mission to Moscow	Sgt. Eugene Tackleberry	
1994	Roseanne: An Unauthorized Biography	Tom Arnold	TV movie
1995	Fist of Legend		English version, Voice
1995	Dragon Kid		Voice
1995	Star Trek: Voyager	Fred Noonan	"The '37s"
1995	The Brady Bunch Movie	Sam Franklin	
1996	Hijacked: Flight 285	Alcoholic	
1996	Citizen Ruth	Judge Richter	
1996	Martin	Officer Hayes	
1997	Step by Step	Dave	Season 6, Ep. 4 "Just Say Maybe"
1997	Star Trek: Deep Space Nine	Leskit	Season 5, Ep. 21 "Soldiers of the Empire"
1998	Brink!	Ralph Brinker	
1999	Touched by an Angel	Dewey Burton	Season 5, Ep. 18 "Anatomy Lesson"
1999	JAG	John Newman	Season 4, Ep. 18 "Shakedown"
2000	Rules of Engagement	ARG Commander	
2000	The Cactus Kid	Charles	
2000	Arli$$	Col. Sadowski	
2000	Becker	Lloyd Martin	Season 2, Ep. 21 "Sight Unseen"
2000	Diagnosis Murder	John	Season 7, Ep. 21 "Swan Song"
2000–2001	The West Wing	Colonel Chase	"The Drop-In" and "The Portland Trip"
