= George R. Robertson =

Canadian actor (1933–2023)

- Born: April 20, 1933; Brampton, Ontario, Canada
- Died: January 29, 2023 (aged 89); Toronto, Ontario, Canada
- Occupation: Actor
- Years active: 1968–2017

George Ross Robertson (April 20, 1933 – January 29, 2023) was a Canadian actor perhaps best known for his roles in the first six Police Academy films and the film JFK.

== Career ==
Robertson was born in Canada in 1933, in the family Stuart Harold Robertson (1900—1973) and Mary (heé Kidd) Robertson (1899—1984). He is best known for portraying Henry J. Hurst in the Police Academy franchise. He portrayed Hurst in the films: Police Academy (1984), Police Academy 2: Their First Assignment (1985), Police Academy 3: Back in Training (1986), Police Academy 4: Citizens on Patrol (1987), Police Academy 5: Assignment Miami Beach (1988), and Police Academy 6: City Under Siege (1989). Like most of his police academy co-stars, he did not return for the seventh and final film in the franchise, Police Academy: Mission to Moscow (1994), although, he did guest appear in the Police Academy sitcom, which aired from 1997 to 1998.

He guest-starred on an episode of The Twilight Zone (1980s version). He also played Dick Cheney in The Path to 9/11. Robertson had 80 acting credits to his name.

== Death ==
Robertson died in Toronto, Ontario on January 29, 2023, at the age of 89.

== Awards ==
In 1993, Robertson was awarded the Margaret Collier Award.

In 2004, he won the Humanitarian Award at the Gemini Awards.

Robertson appeared in three films that were nominated for the Academy Award for Best Picture: 1970's Airport, 1979's Norma Rae and JFK in 1991.

== Filmography ==
Year	Title	Role	Notes
1968	Rosemary's Baby	Lou Comfort	Uncredited
1969	Marooned	VIP	Uncredited
1970	Airport	Richard Stout - Passenger	Uncredited
1973	U-Turn	Tennis pro	
1973	Paperback Hero	Burdock	
1979	Norma Rae	Farmer	
1981	The Amateur	U.S. Consul	
1982	Murder by Phone	George Lord	
1984	Police Academy	Chief / Commissioner Henry Hurst	
1985	Police Academy 2: Their First Assignment	Chief / Commissioner Henry Hurst	
1986	Police Academy 3: Back in Training	Chief / Commissioner Henry Hurst	
1987	Police Academy 4: Citizens on Patrol	Chief / Commissioner Henry Hurst	
1988	Police Academy 5: Assignment Miami Beach	Chief / Commissioner Henry Hurst	
1989	The Twilight Zone	Gen. Greg Slater	TV series, 1 episode
1989	Police Academy 6: City Under Siege	Commissioner Henry Hurst	
1991	Deceived	Adrienne's Father	
1991	JFK	White House Man	
1995	National Lampoon's Senior Trip	President Davis	
1996	Holiday Affair		
1997	Murder at 1600	Mack Falls	
2012	Still Mine	Chester Jones	
