= Alan Myerson =

American film and television director (born 1940)

- Born: July 1, 1940 (age 86)
- Occupations: Film and television director
- Notable work: Private Lessons
- Children: Lincoln Myerson (son)

Alan Myerson (born July 1, 1940) is an American film and television director known for such projects as Private Lessons.

== Career ==
Myerson began working in theatre in New York City, then directing The Second City in Chicago. He co-founded the improvisational comedy troupe The Committee in San Francisco in 1963. He directed films in the 1970s and 1980s, and has directed over 200 television episodes for shows such as Ally McBeal, Boston Public, Friends, Boy Meets World, The Larry Sanders Show, Picket Fences, Miami Vice, Laverne & Shirley, Rhoda, The Bob Newhart Show, and Busting Loose. He has taught acting at UC Berkeley, SF State, and directing at Maine Media Workshops. He is an adjunct professor at the University of Southern California, and has received nominations for Emmy, DGA, and CableACE awards.

== Personal life ==
His has a son, Lincoln Myerson, who is an improvisational performer.

== Filmography ==
=== As director ===
- Steelyard Blues (1973)
- Private Lessons (1981)
- Bayou Romance (1982)
- Police Academy 5 (1988)

=== As actor ===
- Funnyman (1967) - Seymour, Electronics Man
- Billy Jack (1971) - O.K. Corrales
- Police Academy 5 (1988) - Cigar Smoker

== Selected television credits ==
- The TVTV Show (1976)
- Michael Nesmith in Television Parts (1985)
- Hi Honey – I'm Dead (1991)
- Bad Attitudes (1991)
- Boy Meets World (1993–2000)
- The Larry Sanders Show (1994-1998)
- Ned & Stacey (1995)
- Friends (1996)
- Holiday Affair (1996)
