= Paul Maslansky =

American film producer and writer (1933–2024)

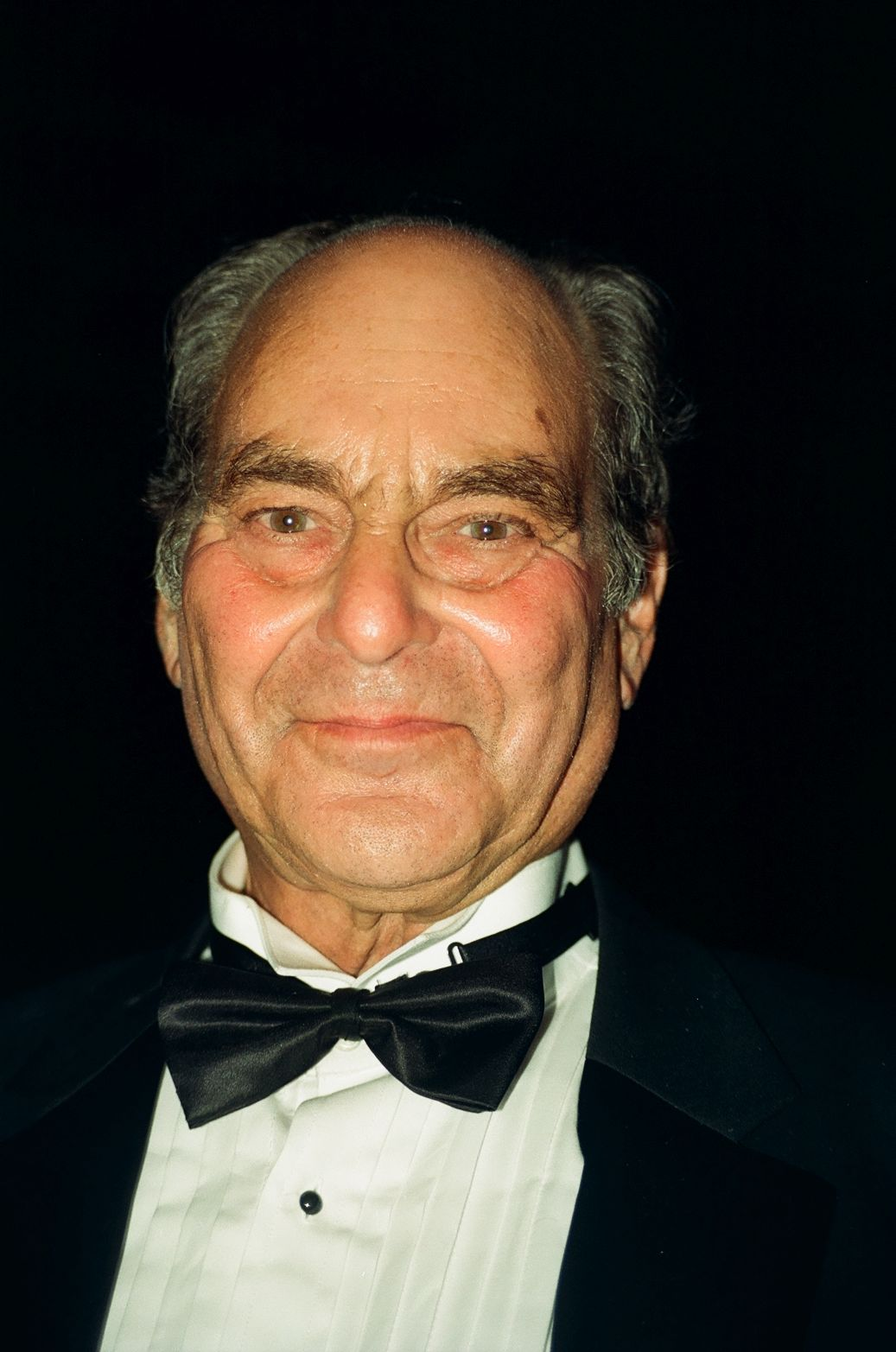
- Maslansky in 1999
- Born: Paul Marc Maslansky; November 23, 1933; New York City, U.S.
- Died: December 2, 2024 (aged 91); Los Robles, California, U.S.
- Occupations: Producer, writer
- Years active: 1964–2024

Paul Marc Maslansky (/məˈzlænski/ mə-ZLAN-skee; November 23, 1933 – December 2, 2024) was an American film producer and writer best known for the Police Academy franchise, and directing the Blaxploitation horror film Sugar Hill (1974).

== Early life ==
Maslansky was born in Harlem, New York, on November 23, 1933. He played jazz for a living while briefly attending law school in New York. He graduated from Washington & Lee University in Lexington, Virginia, in 1954.

== Career ==
Maslansky had 41 film credits as producer or executive producer. His first production credit was for 1964's Castle of the Living Dead, which starred Christopher Lee. Initially, Maslansky used his middle initial in his credits, though this was later dropped. Maslansky worked throughout the 1960s and 1970s as producer, notable credits include Race with the Devil, Damnation Alley, The Villain, and Love Child. He also directed the Blaxploitation Southern Gothic horror film Sugar Hill (1974).

Maslansky was nominated for a Primetime Emmy Award for the 1978 series King.

Maslansky had a breakthrough hit with Police Academy in 1984. From a budget of $4.1 million, the film grossed $155 million and spawned a film franchise and television series Police Academy: The Series, which Maslansky wrote.

He frequently made cameo appearances in the Police Academy movies.

Maslansky's notable credits following Police Academy include 1985's Return to Oz, 1990's The Russia House and Fluke in 1995.

The Lenfest Center for the Art's 'Maslansky Rehearsal Hall' in Lexington is named after him.

== Death ==
Maslansky died in Los Robles, California, on December 2, 2024, aged 91.

== Filmography ==
Maslansky was a producer in all films unless otherwise noted.

=== Film ===
Year	Film	Credit	Notes
1964	Castle of the Living Dead		
1966	The She Beast		
1970	Eyewitness		
1972	Death Line		
1974	Sugar Hill		
1974	Miracles Still Happen	Associate producer	Uncredited
1975	Race with the Devil	Executive producer	
1975	Hard Times	Executive producer	
1976	The Blue Bird		
1977	Damnation Alley		
1978	Circle of Iron		
1979	When You Comin' Back, Red Ryder?	Co-producer	
1979	Hot Stuff	Executive producer	
1979	The Villain	Executive producer	
1979	Scavenger Hunt	Co-producer	
1980	Ruckus		
1981	The Salamander		
1982	Love Child		
1984	Police Academy		
1984	Big Truck and Sister Clare	Executive producer	
1985	Police Academy 2: Their First Assignment		
1985	Return to Oz		
1986	Police Academy 3: Back in Training		
1987	Police Academy 4: Citizens on Patrol		
1988	Police Academy 5: Assignment Miami Beach		
1989	Police Academy 6: City Under Siege		
1989	Honeymoon Academy		Direct-to-video
1990	Ski Patrol	Executive producer	
1990	The Russia House		
1993	Cop and a Half		
1994	Police Academy: Mission to Moscow		
1995	Fluke		
2017	Death of the Sheik	Executive producer	
TBA	Coming Through Slaughter		
TBA	Police Academy		
TBA	The First Force	Executive producer	

As writer

Year	Film	Notes
1964	Castle of the Living Dead	
1984	Police Academy	Uncredited

As an actor

Year	Film	Role	Notes
1975	Race with the Devil	Road Worker in Cowboy Hat	Uncredited
1978	Circle of Iron	Student at Temple	Uncredited
1986	Police Academy 3: Back in Training	Man #4 in Police Line-up	Uncredited
1987	Police Academy 4: Citizens on Patrol	Retirement Home Warden	Uncredited
1988	Police Academy 5: Assignment Miami Beach	Homeless Man at Museum	Uncredited
1989	Police Academy 6: City Under Siege	Man at Precinct Payphone	Uncredited
2021	Silent Life	Adolph Zukor	

Production manager

Year	Film	Role
1963	Jason and the Argonauts	Unit manager
1969	The Red Tent	Executive in charge of production

As director

Year	Film
1974	Sugar Hill

Second unit director or assistant director

Year	Film	Role	Notes
1975	Race with the Devil	Second unit director	Uncredited

Miscellaneous crew

Year	Film	Role
1964	The Long Ships	Assistant to producer

=== Television ===
Year	Title	Credit	Notes
1974	The Gun and the Pulpit		Television film
1978	King		
1987	CBS Schoolbreak Special	Executive producer	
1988	Police Academy	Executive producer	
1997–98	Police Academy: The Series	Executive producer	

As writer

Year	Title
1997–98	Police Academy: The Series

As an actor

Year	Title	Role	Notes
1997–98	Police Academy: The Series	Grumpy Man at Table Grumpy Man in Convertible	Uncredited
