= Brant von Hoffman =

American film and television actor

- Born: United States
- Occupation(s): Film and television actor
- Years active: 1981–2004

Brant von Hoffman is an American former film and television actor. He is best known for playing Cadet/Sgt. Kyle Blankes in the films Police Academy and Police Academy 3: Back in Training.

== Life and career ==
Von Hoffman was born in the United States. He began his screen career in 1981, appearing in the ABC drama television series 240-Robert. The next year, he played as Bennett in an episode of the ABC sitcom television series Laverne & Shirley.

Later in his career, Von Hoffman guest-starred in television programs including Riptide, The John Larroquette Show, Lottery!, Hunter and Home Improvement. He also appeared in films such as Police Academy, Police Academy 3: Back in Training, The Further Adventures of Tennessee Buck (as Ken Manchester), Dudley Do-Right, Guilty by Association and Rustlers' Rhapsody.

Von Hoffman retired from acting in 2004, last appearing in the Fox satirical sitcom television series Arrested Development.
