= Police Academy 5: Assignment Miami Beach =

1988 film by Alan Myerson

Police Academy 5: Assignment: Miami Beach
- Theatrical release poster by Carl Ramsey
- Directed by: Alan Myerson
- Written by: Stephen Curwick
- Based on: Characters by: Neal Israel; Pat Proft
- Produced by: Paul Maslansky
- Starring: Bubba Smith; David Graf; Michael Winslow; Leslie Easterbrook; Marion Ramsey; Janet Jones; Lance Kinsey; Matt McCoy; G. W. Bailey; George Gaynes
- Cinematography: James Pergola
- Edited by: Hubert C. de la Bouillerie
- Music by: Robert Folk
- Distributed by: Warner Bros.
- Release date: March 18, 1988
- Running time: 90 minutes
- Country: United States
- Language: English
- Budget: $14 million
- Box office: $54.5 million

Police Academy 5: Assignment: Miami Beach is a 1988 American comedy film directed by Alan Myerson. It is the fifth installment in the Police Academy franchise, released on March 18, 1988. The film was given a PG rating for language and ribald humor.

Steve Guttenberg was unable to star in this film due to scheduling conflicts with filming Three Men and a Baby. The filmmakers decided instead to cast Matt McCoy as new character Sergeant Nick Lassard. It was followed by Police Academy 6: City Under Siege (1989).

== Plot ==
Captain Thaddeus Harris finally finds a way to become Commandant of the Police Academy; the incumbent Commandant Eric Lassard is past due for mandatory retirement. Meanwhile, Lassard is chosen as "Police Officer of the Decade," he brings his favorite graduates—Sgts. Moses Hightower, Larvell Jones, Eugene Tackleberry and Laverne Hooks, Lt. Debbie Callahan, and new graduate Officer Thomas "House" Conklin—to the National Police Chiefs Convention in Miami Beach to celebrate with him. His retirement is postponed until after his return. While there, they meet his nephew, Sgt. Nick Lassard of the Miami Police Department. Lassard unwittingly takes a bag belonging to jewel thieves containing stolen diamonds.

As the jewel thieves try to get the bag back, Captain Harris tries to prove to Commissioner Hurst he should replace Commandant Lassard, the usual hijinks ensue, including Lassard trying to guess the annual procedural demonstration. When the jewel thieves kidnap Commandant Lassard, he goes willingly, thinking it part of the convention. A negotiation is botched by Captain Harris, getting himself captured as well. Armed with airboats, jet skies and martial arts training, a chase across the Everglades ensues to rescue the oblivious Commandant and takedown the criminals.

In a standoff with the smugglers, Nick explains to his uncle it is not a demonstration and that his kidnappers are in fact real criminals. Upon hearing this, Lassard promptly disarms and subdues his assailant Tony Stark to the amazement of all the officers. At a ceremony at the end of the film, Commissioner Hurst announces that Commandant Lassard will be allowed to continue his duties as Commandant until he sees fit to retire, and Hightower is promoted to Lieutenant for saving Harris's life during the rescue.

Lassard is seen proudly graduating the new class. As revenge for Harris' earlier sabotage against his uncle, Nick intentionally moves the chair away from Harris. Lt. Carl Proctor tries to help him, but kicks the chair too hard and sending both it and Harris on a collision into the drum set. As the police marching band walks off in parade, Harris is seen screaming for Proctor's help.

== Cast ==
=== The Police Force ===
- Michael Winslow as Sergeant Larvell Jones
- David Graf as Sergeant Eugene Tackleberry
- Bubba Smith as Sergeant Moses Hightower
- Marion Ramsey as Sergeant Laverne Hooks
- Leslie Easterbrook as Lieutenant Debbie Callahan
- Tab Thacker as Officer Thomas 'House' Conklin
- George Gaynes as Commandant Eric Lassard
- G. W. Bailey as Captain Thaddeus Harris
- Lance Kinsey as Lieutenant Carl Proctor
- George R. Robertson as Commissioner Henry Hurst
- Matt McCoy as Sergeant Nick Lassard
- Janet Jones as Officer Kate Stratton

=== Others ===
- René Auberjonois as Tony Stark
- Archie Hahn as "Mouse"
- James Hampton as Mayor of Miami
- Ed Kovens as Dempsey
- Scott Weinger as Shark Attack Kid
- Julio Oscar Mechoso as Shooting Range Cop
- Joe Del Campo as Convention Man
- Jerry O'Connell as Beach Kid
- Paul Maslansky as Homeless Man
- Graham Smith as Custody Sergeant S. Chlong

== Production ==
Filming was temporarily suspended when Hurricane Floyd hit southern Florida in October 1987. Fontainebleau Miami Beach was also used as film location for the films Scarface, Goldfinger, Tony Rome and The Bellboy.

The movie's script and some promotional materials list René Auberjonois' character Tony with the full name Tony Stark. The surname was edited because Warner Bros. found out that Tony Stark was a registered trademark by Marvel for the use in their Iron Man comic book.

== Reception ==
=== Box office ===
Police Academy 5: Assignment Miami Beach debuted at number 1 at the box office when it opened on March 18, 1988, with a weekend gross of $6,106,661. It would go on to earn a domestic box office total of $19,510,371 and $54,499,000 worldwide.

=== Critical response ===
On Rotten Tomatoes, the film has a 0% rating based on nine reviews. On Metacritic, the film has a score of 18% based on reviews from 10 critics, indicating "Overwhelming dislike". Audiences polled by CinemaScore gave the film a grade B.

Gene Siskel of the Chicago Tribune gave the film zero stars, reporting, "I didn't laugh once during the entire film—not at the slapstick, not at the humor, which is pitched at the preschool level." His fellow Tribune critic Dave Kehr awarded one star out of four, describing the gags as "blunt and literal." Caryn James of The New York Times wrote that "the formula is pretty long in the tooth by now, and all the extra turns of plot can't disguise that." Michael Wilmington of the Los Angeles Times thought the film was an improvement over the previous three sequels but that the jokes were still "nothing special." Rita Kempley of The Washington Post called it a "fifth-rate rehash of the rather wonderful original." Nige Floyd of The Monthly Film Bulletin called it "the feeblest to date. Neither the picture-postcard setting nor the bungling jewel thieves add anything to the standard formula, while 'guest star' cops Nick Lassard and Kate Stratton hardly make up for the departure of regulars Steve Guttenberg and Bobcat Goldthwait."

== Sequel ==
A sequel titled Police Academy 6: City Under Siege was released in 1989.

== See also ==
- List of films with a 0% rating on Rotten Tomatoes
