= Police Academy: Mission to Moscow =

1994 film directed by Alan Metter

- Theatrical release poster
- Directed by: Alan Metter
- Written by: Randolph Davis; Michele S. Chodos
- Based on: Characters by: Neal Israel; Pat Proft
- Produced by: Paul Maslansky; Leonid Vereshchagin
- Starring: George Gaynes; Michael Winslow; David Graf; Leslie Easterbrook; Claire Forlani; Ron Perlman; Christopher Lee; Charlie Schlatter; G. W. Bailey
- Cinematography: Ian Jones
- Edited by: Dennis Hill; Suzanne Hines
- Music by: Robert Folk
- Distributed by: Warner Bros.
- Release dates: June 17, 1994 (United Kingdom); August 26, 1994 (United States)
- Running time: 83 minutes
- Country: United States
- Languages: English; Russian
- Budget: $10 million
- Box office: $4.3 million

Police Academy: Mission to Moscow is a 1994 American action comedy film starring George Gaynes, Michael Winslow, David Graf and Claire Forlani (in her feature film debut). The film was directed by Alan Metter and written by Randolph Davis and Michele S. Chodos. The film is the seventh and final installment in the Police Academy franchise, and sequel to Police Academy 6: City Under Siege, with cast members Gaynes, Winslow and Graf appearing in all seven films.

== Plot ==
Russian mafia boss Konstantine Konali is laundering money under the guise of a legitimate business: a highly addictive video game that allows him to bring down almost any security system controlled by a computer on which the game has been played, with a string of major robberies as the result.

Desperate to apprehend Konali, Russian Commandant Alexandrei Nikolaivich Rakov sends for help from America. Rakov decides to bring in someone he met at a police convention, Commandant Eric Lassard.

Lassard briefs his team about the mission in Russia, then they head to Moscow. Along with Lassard in Moscow are Sergeant Larvell Jones, Sergeant Eugene Tackleberry, Captain Debbie Callahan, Cadet Kyle Connors and Captain Thaddeus Harris.

As they plan to capture Konali, he has devised a new scheme: to create an even more addictive version of the game, which can bring down any computer security system in the world, including the systems that protect the databases which belong to world powers.

== Cast ==
=== Officers on the Mission to Moscow ===
- Michael Winslow as Sergeant Larvell Jones
- David Graf as Sergeant Eugene Tackleberry
- Leslie Easterbrook as Captain Debbie Callahan
- George Gaynes as Commandant Eric Lassard
- G. W. Bailey as Captain Thaddeus Harris
- Charlie Schlatter as Cadet Kyle Connors

=== The Russians ===
- Christopher Lee as Commandant Aleksandr Nikolaevich Rakov
- Ron Perlman as Konstantin Konali
- Claire Forlani as Sergeant Katrina Sergeeva
- Gregg Berger as Lieutenant Yuri Talinsky
- Alexander Skorokhod as President Boris Yeltsin
- Vladimir Dolinsky as Bellboy
- Maria Vinogradova as Old Woman
- Nikolai Pastukhov as Head of The Family
- Allyn Ann McLerie as Irina Petrovskaya
- Lonnie Burr as Gay Moscovite

=== Others ===
- Richard Israel as Adam Sharp
- Pamela Guest as Lindsay
- Stuart Nisbet as Ed
- David St. James as News Director

== Production ==
The shooting of the film took place in Russia in the fall of 1993. According to the behind-the-scenes featurette Underneath the Mission, included on the DVD release, this was one of the first American-produced comedy films to be allowed to film in post-Soviet Russia itself, with scenes filmed involving the Bolshoi Ballet and on Red Square. Production was temporarily halted due to the October 1993 constitutional crisis and the damaged White House is clearly visible in one scene. Despite the conflict, production was allowed to resume with one of the first scenes after the conflict being filmed at Moscow's Sheremetyevo International Airport. According to an interview with Michael Winslow, in the Underneath the Mission featurette, the scene where Larvell Jones performs bike tricks involved him wearing a wireless microphone in order to pick up his comedic sound effects. Unknown to the production crew, the frequency used by the microphone was the same as that used by the military, resulting in officials descending upon the film crew (though the incident ended on friendly terms, says Paul Maslansky).

== Reception ==
=== Box office ===
Mission to Moscow was released on June 17, 1994, in the United Kingdom on 211 screens and grossed £192,222 ($295,000) for the weekend, finishing in third place. In Germany it was released on June 18, 1994, on 346 screens and grossed 1,212,651 Deutsche Mark ($734,940) finishing at the top of the box office in its opening 4-day weekend. In Sweden it was released the same week on 24 screens and finished in second place. From the three territories, it grossed $1.11 million. It opened two weeks later in the Netherlands, Brazil and Helsinki where it placed second, third and first respectively and then in Paris on July 14 where it placed third. It grossed over $2.5 million in Germany; $900,000 in the United Kingdom; $180,000 in the Netherlands; $220,000 in Sweden; and $320,000 in Brazil. Including initial grosses from Finland and France, the film grossed over $4.2 million internationally.

It did not see a wide release in the United States and Canada. Unlike all the other Police Academy films, Warner Bros. Pictures only released the film in a token, limited run, grossing a scant $126,247 in the U.S. and Canada, making it the least successful movie in the series.

=== Critical response ===
On Rotten Tomatoes the film has an approval rating of 0% based on reviews from eight critics. On Metacritic the film has a score of 11% based on reviews from 4 critics, indicating "overwhelming dislike". According to film historian Leonard Maltin, "If the United States and Soviet Union were still at odds, this film would make a great weapon...it could bore people to death."

== See also ==
- List of films with a 0% rating on Rotten Tomatoes
