= Police Academy 6: City Under Siege =

1989 film by Peter Bonerz

- Theatrical release poster by Morgan Weistling
- Directed by: Peter Bonerz
- Written by: Stephen Curwick
- Based on: Characters by: Neal Israel; Pat Proft
- Produced by: Paul Maslansky
- Starring: Bubba Smith; Michael Winslow; David Graf; Marion Ramsey; Leslie Easterbrook; Lance Kinsey; Bruce Mahler; Kenneth Mars; Matt McCoy; G. W. Bailey; George Gaynes
- Cinematography: Charles Rosher Jr.
- Edited by: Hubert C. de la Bouillerie
- Music by: Robert Folk
- Distributed by: Warner Bros.
- Release date: March 10, 1989
- Running time: 84 minutes
- Country: United States
- Language: English
- Budget: $15 million
- Box office: $33.2 million

Police Academy 6: City Under Siege is a 1989 American comedy crime film starring Bubba Smith, David Graf and Michael Winslow. It was directed by Peter Bonerz and written by Stephen Curwick, based on characters created by Neal Israel and Pat Proft. The sixth installment in the Police Academy franchise, it is the sequel to Police Academy 5: Assignment Miami Beach. The film was given a PG rating for violence and language. This was the fifth and last Police Academy sequel to be released in the year immediately following the previous installment of the series. It would take five years until the release of the following film, Police Academy: Mission to Moscow. Police Academy 6: City Under Siege was also the last film in the series to feature Bubba Smith, Marion Ramsey, Bruce Mahler, Lance Kinsey and George R. Robertson as Moses Hightower, Laverne Hooks, Douglas Fackler, Carl Proctor and Commissioner Henry Hurst respectively.

== Plot ==
In the city, the police are investigating a series of robberies along the old 51 bus route in the area of the city known as Wilson Heights. Captain Thaddeus Harris and Lt. Carl Proctor stake out a jewellery store, but the Wilson Heights gang, composed of Ace, a skilled gunman, Flash, an acrobatic martial artist, and Ox, a strong man, manage to elude capture.

In his office, the mayor is furious with the latest crime spree and reprimands Harris and Commissioner Henry Hurst for his precinct's slow response. The governor is involved now, therefore, has brought in a special team led by Commandant Eric Lassard to stop the robberies. The mayor orders Harris and Hurst to work with Lassard to apprehend the gang. Lassard assembles a seven-man team consisting of gentle-giant Moses Hightower, weapon-crazy Eugene Tackleberry, human beatbox Larvell Jones, passive-aggressive Laverne Hooks, tough and hot Debbie Callahan, accident-prone Douglas Fackler, and Lassard's nephew, Nick from Miami.

At the site of the gang's latest robbery, a bank, the police academy team discovers clues that suggest that the Wilson Heights gang are being orchestrated by some other shadowy figure. After canvassing the neighborhood for any information on the Wilson Heights gang with little success, Nick stumbles upon a paper reporting a priceless diamond heading to a museum, and gets an idea to use it as bait. However, the robbers nab the diamond anyway by cutting a hole in the truck using a laser and escaping through the sewer system. Nick then decides to go undercover to get information regarding a possible hideout, but Harris insists on going instead, and botches the job after Proctor accidentally knocks him over the balcony. Lassard and his men are later suspended after jewelry from the gang's last robbery is found in Lassard's office, pending an investigation.

The team decides to clear his name by investigating and solving the crimes themselves. Having Hooks access data files from a computer, Nick deduces that the robberies are occurring along the old bus line in the city, thus intentionally lowering property values in that part of the city prior to the announcement of a new replacement line system. They also learn that someone must be leaking information to the criminals, which is why they are always one step ahead of the police.

The police academy force finds and does battle with the Wilson Heights criminals during a citywide blackout, Tackleberry taking down Ace, Jones defeating Flash, and Hightower beating Ox, while Nick chases the leader. A pursuit follows, which leads to Hurst's office, where they find Hurst. But, after the real Hurst arrives, Hightower unmasks the fake Hurst to reveal that the mastermind has been the mayor all along. Caught, the mayor admits that Harris has been unwittingly leaking information during his daily meetings with him, and how he could have made billions off the properties if it hadn't been for Lassard and his team. Hurst then apologizes to Lassard and reinstates him and his team, and a plaque is given to honor the officers' bravery the next day.

The movie ends with Harris being flown away by a bunch of balloons attached to his chair during the ceremony; thanks to Lassard.

== Cast ==
=== The Police Force ===
- Matt McCoy as Sergeant Nick Lassard
- Michael Winslow as Sergeant Larvell Jones
- David Graf as Sergeant Eugene Tackleberry
- Bubba Smith as Lieutenant Moses Hightower
- Marion Ramsey as Sergeant Laverne Hooks
- Leslie Easterbrook as Lieutenant Debbie Callahan
- George Gaynes as Commandant Eric Lassard
- G. W. Bailey as Captain Thaddeus Harris
- Lance Kinsey as Lieutenant Carl Proctor
- George R. Robertson as Commissioner Henry Hurst
- Bruce Mahler as Sergeant Douglas Fackler

=== Others ===
- Kenneth Mars as The Mayor
- Gerrit Graham as "Ace"
- Brian Seeman as "Flash"
- Darwyn Swalve as "Ox"
- Sippy Whiddon as M.G.
- Daniel Ben Wilson as Eugene Tackleberry Jr.
- Billie Bird as Mrs. Stanwyck
- Arthur Batanides as Mr. Kirkland
- Greg Collins as SWAT Leader
- Anna Mathias as Bank Teller
- Melle Mel as Rap Man
- Peter Elbling as Store Manager
- Allison Mack as Little Girl
- Roberta Haynes as Bus Passenger
- Dean Norris as Cop
- Charlie Adler as Mastermind (voice)
- Paul Maslansky as Payphone Man

== Production ==
Police Academy 6: City Under Siege was filmed in Los Angeles, California.

Some of the landmarks and people in the film reference Toronto, the city where most of the first four Police Academy films were filmed. The police station is called Oakdale Police Station, referencing the Oakdale area of Toronto which a small area between the western intersections of Highway 400 and Finch Avenue, extending to just south of Sheppard Avenue, and east just past Jane Street. This is often referred to as part of the Downsview area of Toronto. Additionally, the criminal organization behind the crime wave in the city is called the Wilson Heights Gang, a reference to Wilson Heights Boulevard, a street in the Downsview area. The specific area itself is called Wilson Heights as well.

== Reception ==
=== Critical response ===
On Rotten Tomatoes, the film has a 0% rating based on nine reviews, just like its two most recent predecessors. On Metacritic, the film has a score of 16% based on reviews from 8 critics, indicating "Overwhelming dislike". Audiences polled by CinemaScore gave the film a grade B−.

Pete Hammond in Leonard Maltin's Movie Guide gave Police Academy 6: City Under Siege a BOMB rating, writing that "This entry is only—repeat only—for those who thought Police Academy 5 was robbed at Oscar time". The DVD/Video Guide by Mick Martin and Marsha Porter gave the first two Police Academy films 2 stars out of 5; and each subsequent film received a Turkey (their lowest score). Chris Hicks of the Deseret News observed that "No. 6 has a bit less emphasis on vulgarity, indicating that the filmmakers know where their primary audience is—in grade school."

Variety wrote: "Director Peter Bonerz and writer Stephen J. Curwick (the latter taking his second Academy shift) both cut their teeth on TV sitcoms, and it shows. Rarely has a film cried out so desperately for a laughtrack." Richard Harrington of The Washington Post wrote: "In Police Academy 6: City Under Siege, the humor (kind word, that one) vacillates between the soporific and the moronic."

Johanna Steinmetz wrote in the Chicago Tribune:

Police Academy 6 quite literally is a genre in the throes of advanced old age. Its rhythm is weighted with the leisure of time to fill, its humor doled out from a fixed income of predictable gags.

This is a far cry from the brash upstart that was Police Academy 1, with its pell-mell pace and crude laughs. And it`s a further cry from the Keystone comedies whose spirit the Police Academy producers are always trying to invoke.

[...]

It`s worth noting, too, that Police Academy 6 is not the repository for raunch that it`s predecessors were. This movie is so studiously inoffensive that even Walt Disney probably would have been comfortable with it. (But he would have picked up the pace.)

Chris Wellman of the Los Angeles Times:

The official title is Police Academy 6: City Under Siege, but the conspiracy theorists among us and those who remember The Omen can surmise just what that’s short for--Police Academy 666 is more like it. This is comedy so insidious it could scarcely be less than diabolically inspired; to know these 84 minutes is to know an endless living death.

The mild PG rating is hardly indicative of the horrors within. There are no stars to replace the long-departed Steve Guttenberg, just a dizzying stream of supporting players left over from previous manifestations of the P.A. series.

[...]

Directing this episode is Peter Bonerz, whom many will remember as a likable ‘70s sitcom actor with the same fondness with which they remember the former Cat Stevens. (Bob Newhart Show rerun-boycott, anyone?)

=== Box office ===
The film performed poorly at the US box office, opening on March 10, 1989, in second place behind Lean on Me with an opening weekend gross of $4,032,480. It was the first Police Academy film not to place first in the US weekend box office. It ultimately took in a low total of $11,567,217 in the US and Canada and $33,190,000 worldwide.

== Sequel ==
A sequel titled Police Academy: Mission to Moscow, was released in 1994.

== See also ==
- List of films with a 0% rating on Rotten Tomatoes
