= Martin Olson =

American director, producer and writer (born 1956)

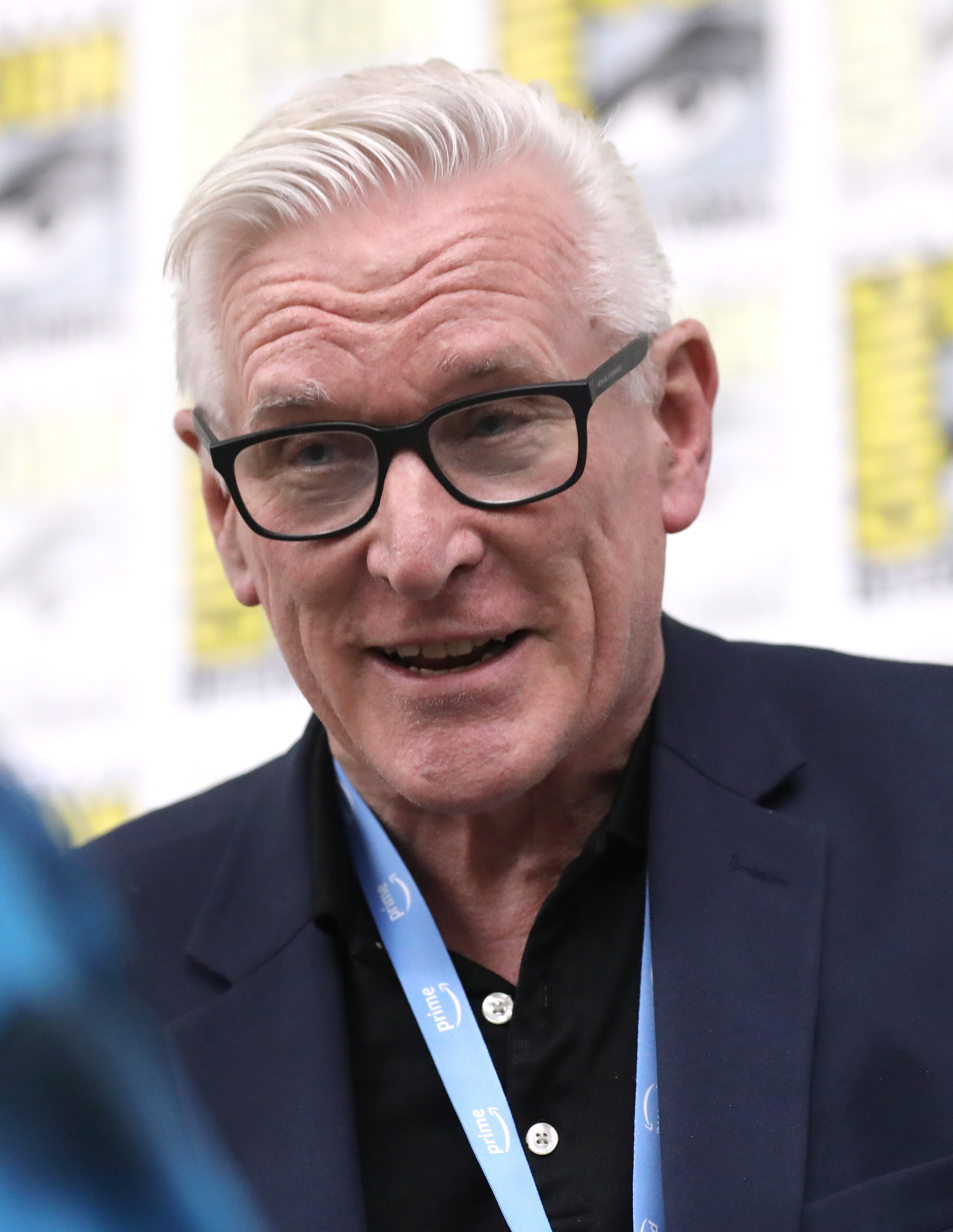
- Olson in 2023
- Born: April 2, 1956 (age 70); Boston, Massachusetts, U.S.
- Occupations: Comedy writer, television producer, author, composer
- Children: 2, including Olivia Olson
- Writing career
- Years active: 1975–present

Martin Olson (born April 2, 1956) is an American comedy writer, television producer, author and composer. He is known for his unusual subject matter, and is an original member of the Boston Comedy Scene. He is the father of writer-songwriter Olivia Olson.

Olson has received six Emmy nominations, five for television writing and one for song writing. Olson also received two Ace Awards for television writing.

== Background ==
Martin Olson is from Boston, Massachusetts. His brother, Thomas Olson, is a film and stage actor. His adopted daughter Olivia Olson is a singer-songwriter, actress, and author. Olson decided to be a comedy writer as a boy when he saw comedian Brother Theodore ranting and raving on The Merv Griffin Show. Before his death in 2001, Theodore became a fan of Olson's first book, Encyclopædia of Hell (Feral House, 2011), and wrote a quote for the book cover.

== Career ==
Olson began writing for comedians before there were any comedy clubs in Boston. As a young man, he sent batches of jokes to Rodney Dangerfield, which were always returned with the same polite note scrawled at the bottom, "Sorry, Marty!" (according to his agent's press kit, years later when writing for Penn & Teller in Las Vegas, Olson produced comedy bits with Dangerfield and the two became friends). Olson first sold comedy material to the hosts of local "Gong Shows", which began his career as a comedy writer.

=== Boston Comedy ===
Tonight Show comedian Sean Morey opened a comedy school where producers Paul Barclay and Bill Downes met Olson and decided to start a comedy showcase at Boston's Charles Theater on Wednesday nights, the first comedy club in Boston in 1977. There Olson became house piano player and performed as a comedian with an absurdist deadpan act, playing the guitar and hosting other comedians as his eccentric guests. Olson worked for or wrote with the comedians who became his friends, including Sean Morey, Lenny Clarke, Bobcat Goldthwait, Joe Alaskey, Don Gavin, Barry Crimmins, Steven Wright, Jimmy Tingle, Denis Leary, Steve Sweeney, Kevin Meaney and Kevin Nealon.

Olson and comedian Lenny Clarke became roommates in Harvard Square; comedians from all over the country stayed with them while performing in Boston comedy clubs. Olson wrote for Clarke, who was the most popular comedian in Boston. Their apartment became known as The Barracks, a legendary hub of comedy and depravity that was the subject of a television special on Boston comedy in the 1980s, and also of the award-winning documentary on the Boston comedy scene When Standup Stood Out (2006) directed by filmmaker-comedian Fran Solomita.

When comedian, writer and political satirist Barry Crimmins started the second comedy club in the Boston area called the Ding Ho, Olson became piano player and with writer Jim Harris created Lenny Clarke's Late Show, a late-night comedy series on TV-38 hosted and co-written by Clarke. This bizarre, two-hour weekly monster movie show attracted a small but dedicated cult following. After two years Olson and Clarke were fired for airing two controversial segments ("News for Negroes" and "The Mentally Challenged Faith Healer" featuring Bobcat Goldthwait).

=== Olson and the West Coast comedy scene ===
Olson took his tapes from the show and drove cross-country to San Francisco with comedian Don Gavin. There, by coincidence, the 1980 San Francisco Comedy Competition was starting up, which offered a first prize of $10,000. Olson helped Gavin audition and make it into the finals. There Olson met his future wife Kay Furtado, a writer who had been flown to San Francisco to coach another comedian in the competition. A year later they were married in a ceremony in San Francisco by comedian Michael Pritchard, attended by all of the local comedians. Olson and his wife moved to Los Angeles where they raised two children, Casey Olson and Olivia Olson.

=== Writing and directing ===
In Los Angeles, Olson was head writer for several HBO comedy specials, staff writer for the Screen Actors Guild Awards for three years, co-wrote (with Kevin Meaney) an award-winning series for Comedy Central in London and was head writer or staff writer for many animated series voiced by his comedian friends, notably Rocko's Modern Life for Nickelodeon. He was head writer for the first season of the Disney animated series Phineas and Ferb.

While staff writer for Rocko's Modern Life, Olson's office was next to that of Stephen Hillenburg, his friend who years later would create SpongeBob SquarePants. Olson read The Intertidal Zone, an educational comic book hosted by a sea sponge character, which Hillenburg had written and illustrated. Olson enthusiastically encouraged Hillenburg to create an underwater television series like the book, which became the SpongeBob series.

Olson wrote, co-wrote or directed a number of off-beat stage plays in Los Angeles, including "The Head", "The Idiots", "I Never Knew My Father", "1958", "Torn", "The Ron Lynch Show", "The Bob Rubin Experience" and "Cold Black Heart" at various theaters, including the Comedy Central Stage, the HBO Theater and the Steve Allen Theater in Hollywood. Olson and his writing partner comedian Jeremy Kramer were head writers for Fox's Comic Strip Live, for Screen Actors Guild Awards for three years, and for the animated series The Twisted Tales of Felix the Cat. Olson was also producer of Penn & Teller's FX variety series Penn & Teller's Sin City Spectacular.

With the help of his literary agent Annette Van Duren, Olson sold comedy screenplays to DreamWorks, United Artists, Touchstone Pictures, and Warner Bros. He wrote the satirical book Encyclopaedia of Hell, and sold the film rights to Warner Bros. through Andrew Lazar of Mad Chance Productions. With Ken Kaufman and Howard Klausner, Olson co-wrote the final draft of the screenplay adaptation of his book for WB under a new title, D-Men.

Olson collaborated with many writers and artists: with special effects director Phil Tippett on the screenplay for Veronica's Daughter, with writer-director Bobcat Goldthwait on the screenplay Sightings for United Artists, with writer-comedian Rob Schneider on the screenplay Family Disorder for Touchstone, with writer-comedian Kevin Nealon on the screenplay Late Bloomer, with director Ken Locsmandi on the story and screenplay for Bronson Beak, and with sci-fi novelist Robert Sheckley on the screen adaptation of his wonderful novel Dimension of Miracles. Olson was a contributing story writer ("Additional Writing By") and songwriter for Disney's TV film Phineas and Ferb the Movie: Across the 2nd Dimension. Olson also adapted the novel The Man Who Was Thursday, by G. K. Chesterton, as a screenplay for Andrew Lazar of Mad Chance.

In 2016, Olson was staff writer for Disney's Milo Murphy's Law, and in 2017 co-wrote the story for Nickelodeon's animated film Rocko's Modern Life: Static Cling, a highly anticipated revival of Nickelodeon's cult-classic series Rocko's Modern Life.

=== Acting ===
As an occasional actor, Olson has guest-starred in live-action sequences in SpongeBob SquarePants ("Mermaid Man and Barnacle Boy V" and "Swamp Mates"), in "Don't Watch This Show" by director-comedian Bobcat Goldthwait, in the documentary When Standup Stood Out by filmmaker Fran Solomita, and on The Tonight Show playing an Indian yogi with comedian Bobcat Goldthwait. Olson also plays Hunson Abadeer aka "The Lord of Evil" on Cartoon Network's Adventure Time and his real-life daughter Olivia Olson voices the role of his character's daughter, Marceline the Vampire Queen. Olson also appears in videos by his friends Garfunkel and Oates, Melinda Hill, Katie Schwartz, Adam Scott Franklin and Rich Dorato.

=== Music and songwriting ===
Olson is a twice-Emmy-nominated songwriter, and an Annie-nominated songwriter, having written or co-written over three hundred and fifty songs produced for television or film. He has appeared as a singer on several television shows, including SpongeBob SquarePants and Phineas and Ferb. His satirical songs were regularly featured on many television series, including London Underground (Comedy Central), Rocko's Modern Life (Nickelodeon), Get That Puss Off Your Face (HBO), Camp Lazlo (CN), Penn and Teller's Sin City Spectacular (FX), The Twisted Tales of Felix the Cat (CBS), Phineas and Ferb and Milo Murphy's Law (both for Disney). Along with over three hundred songs for Disney TV, Olson wrote eight songs for Disney's TV film Phineas and Ferb the Movie: Across the 2nd Dimension and four songs for the Disney+ film Phineas and Ferb the Movie: Candace Against the Universe. Olson and his friend director Bobcat Goldthwait also co-wrote the theme song for Don't Watch This Show (Cinemax).

At Disney Studios, with songwriting partners Dan Povenmire and Swampy Marsh, Olson co-wrote songs with Bobby Lopez, co-writer of Broadway's The Book of Mormon and Disney's Frozen. Olson also co-wrote five songs with Povenmire and Marsh for their film Dick! The Musical. Olson, Povenmire and Marsh also wrote a song for Disney's Milo Murphy's Law with Grammy-winning songwriter Mike Stoller, and several songs with Kate Micucci of Scrubs and Garfunkel and Oates.

Olson has had his songs performed by a diverse list of artists, including Clay Aiken, Chaka Khan, Jack Jones, "Weird Al" Yankovic, Kenny Loggins, Kate Pierson of The B-52's, Fee Waybill of The Tubes, Michael McKean of Spinal Tap, Wayne Brady of Whose Line Is It Anyway?, Jack McBrayer of 30 Rock, Malcolm McDowell, Jaret Reddick of Bowling for Soup, Richard O'Brien of The Rocky Horror Show, French Stewart, Ian McKellen, Joey Lawrence, Ashley Tisdale, Christian Slater, Sheena Easton, Carmen Carter, Jemaine Clement of Flight of the Conchords, Robbie Wyckoff, Tom Kenny of SpongeBob, Allison Janney, Big Bad Voodoo Daddy and his daughter, singer-songwriter Olivia Olson.

Olson first collaborated with songwriter Jeff Root on four home studio albums in the 1970s.

Olson's latest CD was written and recorded with his daughter Olivia Olson (July 2013) and called The Father-Daughter Album of Unspeakable Beauty, released at Comicon SD 2013, and their new album, Hey I'm Not Dead Yet, has a release date at Comicon NYC 2021 (delayed due to covid).

=== Books ===
Olson's encyclopedic satire Encyclopaedia of Hell is published by Feral House (July 2011); the film rights were bought by Warner Bros. through producer Andrew Lazar for Mad Chance. The French edition was published in 2016 by Les Editions Lapin, Paris. His notorious children's book The Adventure Time Encyclopaedia (July 2013), published by Abrams Books, reached #5 on the New York Times Best-Seller List. His latest Abrams book, The Enchiridion/Marcy's Super-Secret Scrapbook, was cowritten with his daughter Olivia Olson, and released at Comicon NYC 2015.

His fourth book is The Conquest of Heaven, a mystical history book from the future, and a breakdown of the paradoxical Secrets of the Universe, written by demons and angels. Conquest is a sequel to his first book from Feral House.

Olson also wrote two unpleasant collections of poems, Hitler's Dog and Imaginary History of Reality, which are available for free DL.

== Awards ==
Olson has six Emmy Nominations, five for TV writing and one for songwriting:

- Olson, Martin. 2016 Prime Time Emmy Nomination/Outstanding Animated Program – "Phineas & Ferb".
- Olson, Martin. 2014 Prime Time Emmy Nomination/Outstanding Short Form Animated Program – "Phineas & Ferb".
- Olson, Martin. 2012 Prime Time Emmy Nomination/Outstanding Short Form Animated Program – "Phineas & Ferb".
- Olson, Martin. 2010 Emmy Nomination/Songwriting – "Phineas & Ferb".
- Olson, Martin. 2009 Prime Time Emmy Nomination/Outstanding Special Class - Short Form Animated Program – "Phineas & Ferb".
- Olson, Martin. 2008 Emmy Nomination/Songwriting – "Phineas & Ferb".

== Selected publications ==
- Olson, Martin (2005). IQ 83. Martin Olson.
- Olson, Martin (2011). Encyclopaedia of Hell. Feral House. ISBN 978-1936239047.
- Olson, Martin (2013). Adventure Time Encyclopaedia. Abrams Books. ISBN 978-1419705649.
- Olson, Martin (2010). Imaginary History of Reality – Selected Poems. Martin Olson.
- Sheckley, Robert; Olson, Martin (2007). On the Good Ship Mandelbrot. Martin Olson.

== Screenwriting ==
=== Television ===
- Lenny Clarke’s Late Show (1980)
- The New Adventures of Beans Baxter (1987)
- The Power of Choice - PBS (1988)
- Monsters (1989)
- Little Dracula (1991)
- Comic Strip Live (1992–1993)
- Rocko's Modern Life (1993–1996)
- The Twisted Tales of Felix the Cat (1995–1996)
- Captain Simian & the Space Monkeys (1996–1997)
- Extreme Ghostbusters (1997)
- Monster Farm (1998)
- Mad Jack the Pirate (1998)
- Penn & Teller's Sin City Spectacular (1998–1999)
- Gadget & the Gadgetinis (2003)
- Camp Lazlo (2005)
- Phineas and Ferb (2007–2015, 2025–present)
- The Twisted Whiskers Show (2009)
- Johnny Test (2011)
- Wild Grinders (2012)
- Milo Murphy's Law (2016–2019)

=== Films ===
- Elf Bowling: The Great North Pole Elf Strike (2007)
- Phineas and Ferb the Movie: Across the 2nd Dimension (2011) (Additional Writing By)
- We Wish You a Merry Walrus (2014)
- Rocko's Modern Life: Static Cling (2019)
