= Bobcat Goldthwait =

American comedian and actor (born 1962)

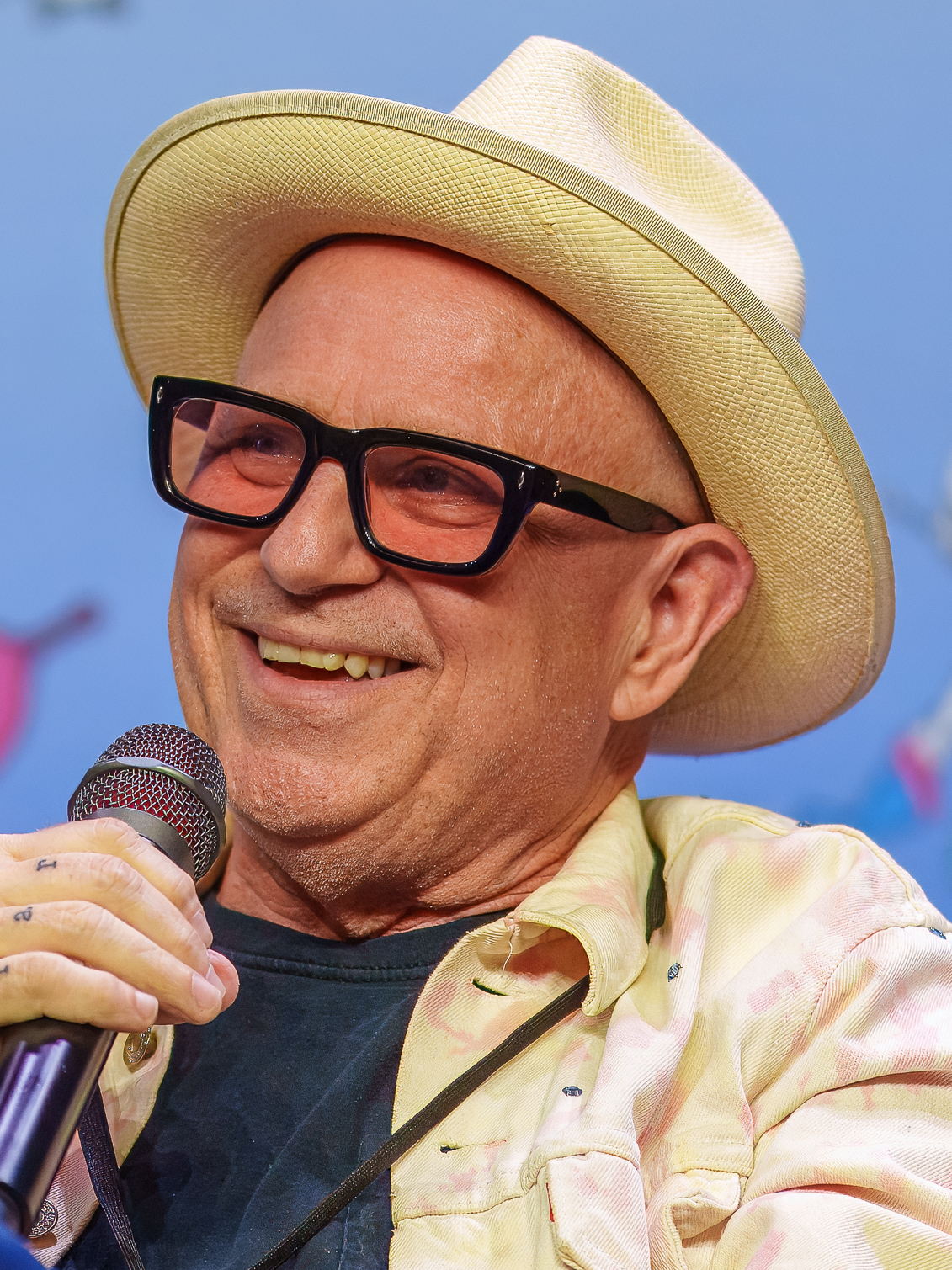
- Goldthwait at GalaxyCon San Jose in 2025
- Born: Robert Francis Goldthwait; May 26, 1962 (age 64); Syracuse, New York, U.S.
- Occupations: Stand-up comedian; actor; director; screenwriter
- Years active: 1980–present
- Spouses: Ann Luly (m. 1986; div. 1998) Sarah de Sa Rego (m. 2009; div. 2014) Pollyanna McIntosh (m. 2024)
- Partner: Nikki Cox (1997–2005)
- Children: 2

Comedy career
- Medium: Stand-up; film; television
- Genres: Anti-humor; black comedy; blue comedy; character comedy; cringe comedy; political satire
- Subjects: American politics; everyday life

Robert Francis "Bobcat" Goldthwait (born May 26, 1962) is an American comedian, actor, director, and screenwriter. He is known for his black comedy stand-up act, delivered through an energetic stage persona with an unusual raspy and high-pitched voice. He came to prominence with his stand-up specials An Evening with Bobcat Goldthwait—Share the Warmth and Bob Goldthwait—Is He Like That All the Time? and his acting roles, including Zed in the Police Academy franchise and Eliot Loudermilk in Scrooged. Since 2012, he has been a regular panelist on the radio-quiz show Wait Wait... Don't Tell Me!.

Goldthwait has written and directed a number of films and television series, most notably the black comedies Shakes the Clown (1991), in which he also starred, Sleeping Dogs Lie (2006), World's Greatest Dad (2009), God Bless America (2011), and the horror film Willow Creek (2013); episodes of Chappelle's Show, Jimmy Kimmel Live! (2004–07), and Maron (2013–15); and several stand-up specials, including Patton Oswalt: Tragedy Plus Comedy Equals Time (2014).

He has also worked extensively as a voice actor, with voice roles in Capitol Critters (1992–95), Hercules (1997), and Hercules: The Animated Series (1998–99), and has provided the voice of Pop Fizz in the Skylanders video game series since the character's debut in 2012's Skylanders: Giants.

== Early life ==
Robert Francis Goldthwait was born on May 26, 1962, in Syracuse, New York, the son of Kathleen Ann (née Welch), a department store employee, and Thomas Lincoln Goldthwait, a sheet metal worker. He was raised in a working-class Catholic family.

At an early age, Goldthwait decided on a career as a comedian, inspired by enjoying making his friends laugh. During his time at St. Matthew's Grammar School, Goldthwait would host performances for his friends regularly, among them being future voice actor Tom Kenny. Goldthwait would experiment with new content, and developed a strong liking for props.

I had nuns for all my grammar school, and there I was just told that I was not funny and that I was fat—it was just my first dealings with critics, actually. And I really did. I had like a nun telling me I was fat. It's no wonder as an adult I had "manorexia" for, like, ten years. And then in high school I still went to a Catholic school but I had these teachers that were kind of very encouraging. You know, Tom Kenny and myself were doing stand-up comedy when we were fifteen. I remember in physics class falling asleep, and the physics teacher going "Well, you know, they did a show last night, and they're on another journey," and the guy was cool with it, you know? And I had an English teacher that was the same way: Santo Berlotti, who was very encouraging of me writing and stuff.

In 1980, Goldthwait and Kenny graduated from Bishop Grimes Junior/Senior High School in East Syracuse, New York. They formed a comedy troupe called The Generic Comics. In their mid-teens, they saw an ad for an open-mic night in Skaneateles that featured comedian Barry Crimmins with the moniker "Bear Cat". He and Kenny went to the event and performed under the monikers Bobcat and Tomcat, respectively, as a tribute to Crimmins. Early in his career, Goldthwait also co-wrote with Martin Olson, who is listed as writer on his first two comedy specials Share the Warmth and Don't Watch This Show.

In 1985, he co-starred in the George Carlin HBO television series Apt. 2C of which only the pilot episode was ever made.

== Career ==
=== Stand-up ===
Goldthwait became recognized as a solo stand-up comedian and had a record "Meat Bob" and two televised concert specials in the 1980s: An Evening with Bobcat Goldthwait —Share the Warmth and Bob Goldthwait —Is He Like That All the Time? He became known for his unique brand of comedy, which combines elements of political satire and often bizarre or unsettling black comedy.

In the 1990s, Goldthwait and Robin Williams appeared on the same bill together, but not as a comedy team, using the names Jack Cheese and Marty Fromage. Later, Goldthwait used the name Jack Cheese when he appeared in Tapeheads. When Williams made a cameo as Mime Jerry in Goldthwait's Shakes the Clown, he was billed as Marty Fromage.

Q: Tell me a little bit about Jack Cheese and Marty Fromage.
A: Well, all that was is Robin and I would perform sometimes—like, sometimes I would perform as Jack Cheese, and honestly, this is twenty years ago, when me showing up at a club would actually be something you'd have to keep on the downlow. Now, you put my real name there, and there's still plenty of empty seats. So it's when Robin and I would go out here in the Bay Area and do comedy, and we would just be performing under fake names just because of other concert obligations and stuff. So it was just so we could go out and write, yeah. (2009)

During the fall of 1993, Goldthwait performed stand-up material as an opening act for Nirvana on what would be their final North American tour. He had been selected for the slot due to frontman Kurt Cobain being a fan of his comedy, and the two developed a friendship over the course of the tour. He also appeared in a promo video for the band's album In Utero and once fooled an interviewer during a phone interview, impersonating Dave Grohl. At midnight on New Year's Eve 1993, Goldthwait rappelled nude from a catwalk of the stage at the Oakland Coliseum as Kurt Cobain led a countdown.

Goldthwait filmed a half-hour HBO special in 1995, and another comedy album in 2003 I Don't Mean to Insult You, But You Look Like Bobcat Goldthwait and in 2004 his stand-up was featured in Comedy Central's animated series Shorties Watchin' Shorties.

=== Acting ===
Goldthwait has appeared in several films. His first major role was Zed in the Police Academy franchise. He starred in One Crazy Summer, Burglar, Scrooged, and Hot to Trot. In 1992, Goldthwait directed, wrote, and starred in Shakes the Clown. He also made an appearance as a writer in Radioland Murders.

In 1985, Goldthwait appeared in Twisted Sister's official video to "Leader of the Pack" and "Be Chrool to Your Scuel" from Come Out and Play.

In 1992, Goldthwait appeared as a guest-co-host of the second episode of The Ben Stiller Show. He appeared as a relative of Peggy Bundy on the Married... with Children show where he and his wife dropped one of their numerous offspring on the Bundys. Later in 1992, Goldthwait was a guest star as an excitable and peculiar psychiatrist in the second episode, season one of the sitcom, Golden Palace (starring Betty White, Rue McClanahan, Estelle Getty, Don Cheadle, and Cheech Marin).

=== Talk show guest appearance controversies ===
In 1993, Goldthwait appeared on Late Night with Conan O'Brien, where he tossed furniture and ran around the set, then into the audience.

In April 1994, as a guest on one of the last episodes of The Arsenio Hall Show, Goldthwait became demonstrably upset that the program was being canceled. At the time, it was widely believed that Paramount Studios had refused to renew Hall's contract because Late Night with David Letterman was moving to CBS, and Goldthwait took his anger out on Paramount. He stood on the set's couch, spray-painted "Paramount Sucks" on a glass wall, and threw video equipment around the studio. Hall was forced to try to restrain Goldthwait and security was called to the set.

On May 9, 1994, Goldthwait appeared on The Tonight Show with Jay Leno, where he briefly lit the guest chair on fire using lighter fluid and a lighter. As a result, he became the first Tonight Show guest to be charged with a crime for what he did on the show. He was fined $2,700 plus the cost of the chair ($698); he was also required to tape several public-service announcements about fire safety. Despite banishment rumors, Leno invited Goldthwait to appear seven days later for a bit with Goldthwait buried up to his neck in dirt.

In August 1994, these incidents were the basis of the plot of his subsequent appearance on The Larry Sanders Show, in which the fictional talk show hires him in the hope of improving the show's ratings if he does another stunt.

These incidents also inspired a MadTV pseudo-PSA on fire safety.

=== Later work ===
Goldthwait was in four episodes of Space Ghost Coast to Coast: "Bobcat", "Surprise", "Anniversary", and an uncredited appearance in the episode "Kentucky Nightmare".

One of the most recognizable features of Goldthwait's performances is his voice. He has voiced characters on the television series Capitol Critters (1992), The Moxy Show (1993–1995), Unhappily Ever After (1995–1999), The Tick (1995), Hercules, Hercules: The Animated Series (1998–1999), Lilo & Stitch: The Series (2003–2006), and Buzz Lightyear of Star Command (2000). Goldthwait has also appeared as himself hosting the comedy quiz show Bobcat's Big Ass Show (1998). Goldthwait was also a semi-regular guest in the later seasons of the Tom Bergeron-version of Hollywood Squares in 1998.

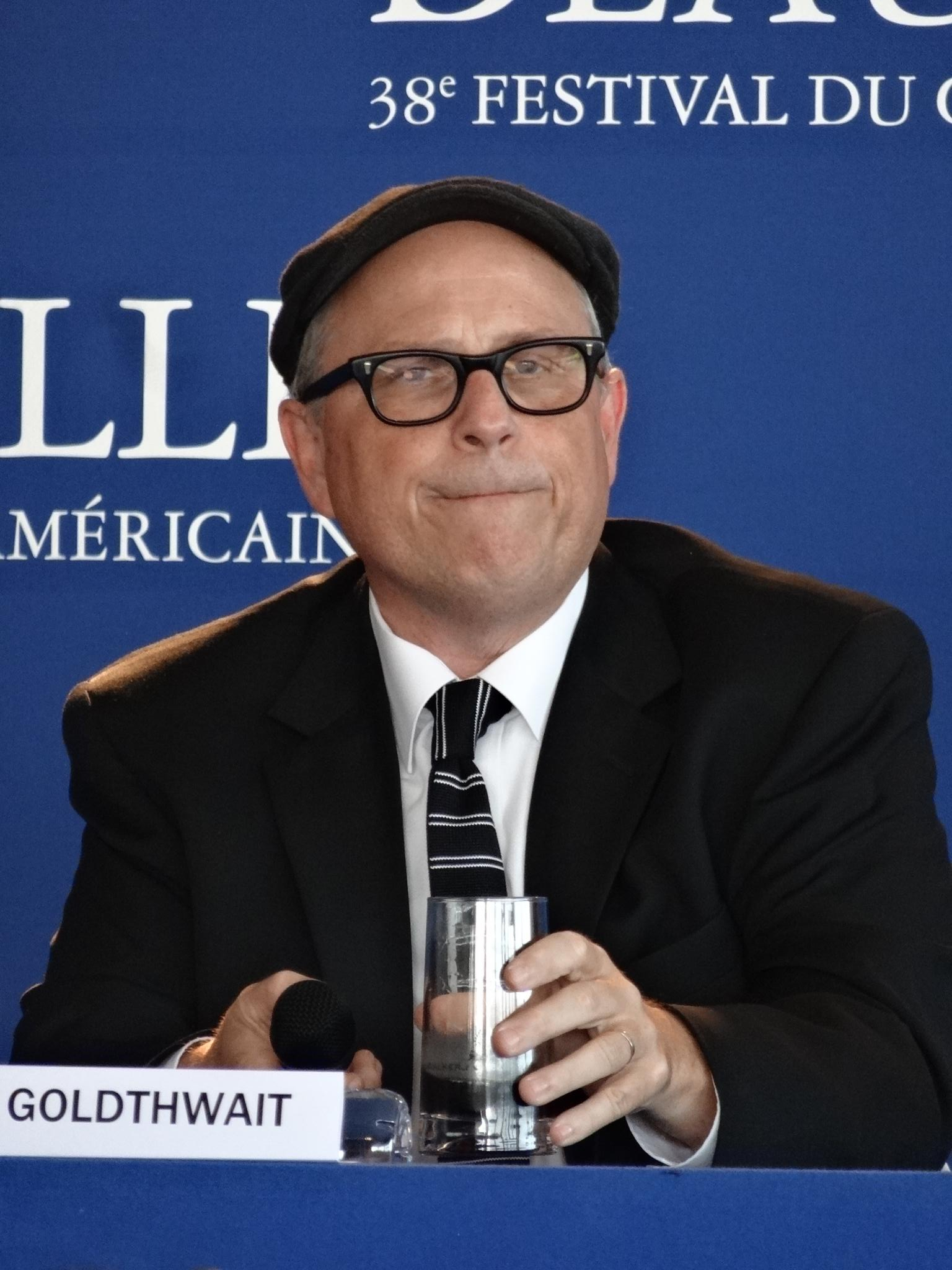
Goldthwait at the Festival du Cinema Americain, Deauville, in 2012

Goldthwait was a featured guest on the August 20, 2009, episode of Adam Carolla's podcast. And on August 26, 2009, he returned to guest on Jimmy Kimmel Live! with old friend Robin Williams, during which he revealed a tattoo on his buttocks of an anthropomorphized cymbal with a mustache and slanted eyes (a pun on the Chinese symbol tattoo).

Goldthwait appeared in September 2010 on an episode of LA Ink, where shop owner Kat Von D gave him a tattoo of a potato, impaled on a fork, on his upper right arm. Goldthwait chose the design to remind himself of where he came from and to tell close friends and family that he had not lost his sense of humor. He also displayed his older tattoo of a cymbal with a moustache on his buttocks.

Goldthwait appeared on the May 4, 2012, episode of Real Time with Bill Maher. Goldthwait was a voice guest in Season 4 of Adventure Time, voicing Ed in the episode "Web Weirdos". Goldthwait appeared on NPR's Wait Wait... Don't Tell Me! on May 12, 2012, to talk about his film God Bless America and play the game "Not My Job" (he won). He then made his debut as one of the show's panelists on the July 14, 2012.

In 2012, he voiced a character known as Pop Fizz, an overexcited gremlin chemist with the ability to drink his potion and become a rampaging monster, for the hit video game series Skylanders, starting with Skylanders: Giants. Pop Fizz appeared in Skylanders: SWAP Force as Super Gulp Pop Fizz, Skylanders: Trap Team as Fizzy Frenzy Pop Fizz, and Skylanders: Superchargers as Big Bubble Pop Fizz. He later reprised the role of Pop Fizz in the 2016 Netflix series Skylanders Academy. The show ended in 2018.

=== Directing ===
Goldthwait began directing Jimmy Kimmel Live! in 2004. While there, ratings for the show increased to over 2 million viewers per night, and jumped 50% with teens; however, in May 2006 Goldthwait left to pursue his film career. Goldthwait maintains contact with Kimmel and still directs for television and film. He returned to directing segments for Jimmy Kimmel Live! in the summer of 2007.

==== Shakes the Clown ====
Shakes the Clown is a dark comedy about a birthday-party clown (Goldthwait) in the grip of depression and alcoholism, who is framed for murder. Different communities of clowns, mimes and other performers are depicted as clannish, rivalrous subcultures obsessed with precedence and status. This was Goldthwait's bitter satire of the dysfunctional standup comedy circuit he knew as a performer.

==== Windy City Heat ====
Windy City Heat is a made-for-TV reality film chronicling an elaborate prank on aspiring actor Perry Caravello, who is made to believe he has been cast in the starring role of an eponymously titled action movie about a Chicago sports detective. The film premiered on Comedy Central to underwhelming ratings but has since accrued the status of an underground cult classic.

==== Sleeping Dogs Lie ====
Goldthwait's third feature film Sleeping Dogs Lie (originally titled Stay) starring Melinda Page Hamilton was in the 2006 Sundance Film Festival and was part of the "Independent Dramatic Features" competition. Sleeping Dogs Lie is about a youthful, impulsive instance of oral sex performed on a dog which opens the door to a black comedy about the complexities of honesty. It was also nominated for the Grand Jury Prize in the "Dramatic Features" category. The film was bought by Roadside Attractions & Samuel Goldwyn Films at the 2006 Sundance Film Festival for the North American rights to the film, and was released on October 20, 2006. Gaumont bought the international rights to the film. It was released on February 21, 2007, by Gaumont in France, and on March 16, 2007, in the UK. On May 4, 2007, it was presented as John Waters' annual selection of a favorite film within Maryland Film Festival.

==== World's Greatest Dad ====
Goldthwait's fourth feature film, World's Greatest Dad, was released on July 24, 2009, on video-on-demand providers before its limited theatrical release on August 21. It starred Robin Williams, Daryl Sabara, and Alexie Gilmore. The web site for the 2009 Sundance Film Festival described it as a "lusciously perverse, and refreshingly original comedy that tackles love, loss, and our curious quest for infamy". Roger Ebert of the Chicago Sun-Times gave World's Greatest Dad 3 out of 4 stars, but commented that the material could have been even darker in its satire, and he questioned whether it was the director's intention.

==== God Bless America ====
God Bless America premiered at the 2011 Toronto International Film Festival and screened within Maryland Film Festival 2012.

==== Willow Creek ====
Willow Creek premiered at the 2013 Independent Film Festival of Boston and screened within such festivals as Maryland Film Festival. The film made its debut on the West Coast at the Arcata Theatre Lounge in Arcata, California, on May 31, 2013, near its filming location of Willow Creek, California.

On July 20, 2013, Willow Creek had its international premier at the Fantasia Festival in Montreal.

In 2017, American Bigfoot, Goldthwait's short documentary about the Ohio Bigfoot Conference featured Alexie Gilmore and Bryce Johnson of Willow Creek.

==== Call Me Lucky ====
In 2015, Goldthwait premiered Call Me Lucky, his documentary on the life and work of comedian/activist Barry Crimmins, at the Sundance Film Festival.

==== Joy Ride ====
In August 2019, Goldthwait and fellow comedian Dana Gould set out to film their two-person stand-up show, but the project was postponed when the pair were in an auto accident on the way to the first performance. After recovering, they were able to film four shows in February 2020. Joy Ride was released in October 2020 and received a 100% from Rotten Tomatoes.

=== Misfits & Monsters ===
On July 11, 2018, Goldthwait's anthology television series Bobcat Goldthwait's Misfits & Monsters premiered on truTV.

== Personal life ==
Goldthwait's marriage to his first wife Ann Luly lasted from 1986 to 1998. In 1997, he was engaged to Nikki Cox. Goldthwait was married to his second wife, Sarah de Sá Rêgo, from 2009 to 2014. He married Pollyanna McIntosh in 2024.

In 2011, he was the best man at Robin Williams' third wedding.

Goldthwait says he has not consumed drugs or alcohol since he was 19.

== Awards and honors ==
Goldthwait's film Windy City Heat won a Comedian Award for Best Comedy Film at Montreal's Just for Laughs Film Festival in 2009.

In June 2015, Bobcat Goldthwait was named "Filmmaker on the Edge" at the 17th Annual Provincetown International Film Festival. John Waters presented the prize.

== Discography ==
- Meat Bob (1988) Chrysalis Records
- I Don't Mean to Insult You, but You Look Like Bobcat Goldthwait (September 23, 2003, Comedy Central Records)
- You Don't Look the Same Either (May 8, 2012, Comedy Central Records)
- Soldier for Christ (2023, Pretty Good Friends Records)

== Filmography ==
=== Film ===
==== As director ====
Year	Title	Notes
1991	Shakes the Clown	also writer
2003	Windy City Heat	documentary
2006	Sleeping Dogs Lie	also writer
2009	World's Greatest Dad	also writer
2011	God Bless America	also writer
2013	Willow Creek	also writer
2015	Call Me Lucky	documentary
2017	American Bigfoot	documentary
2021	Joy Ride	documentary

==== As performer/himself ====
Year	Title	Character\Notes
1984	Massive Retaliation	Deputy
1985	Police Academy 2: Their First Assignment	Zed
1986	Twisted Sister: Come Out and Play	Store Clerk & Teacher
1986	Police Academy 3: Back in Training	Cadet Zed
1986	One Crazy Summer	Egg Stork
1987	Burglar	Carl Helfer
1987	Police Academy 4: Citizens on Patrol	Zed
1988	Hot to Trot	Fred P. Chaney
1988	Tapeheads	Billed as Jack Cheese; Don Druzel
1988	Scrooged	Eliot Loudermilk
1989	Cranium Command	Adrenal Gland
1989	Meet the Hollowheads	Billed as Jack Cheese; Cop #1
1990	Little Vegas	
1991	Shakes the Clown	Shakes the Clown
1993	Freaked	Sockhead as Tourist / Sockhead (voice)
1994	Radioland Murders	Wild Writer
1995	Destiny Turns on the Radio	Mr. Conally
1996	Back to Back	Psycho
1997	Sweethearts	Charles
1997	Dog's Best Friend	
1997	Hercules	Pain (voice)
1998	Rusty: A Dog's Tale	Jet the Turtle (voice)
2000	Lion of Oz	The Silly Oz-Bul (voice)
2000	G-Men from Hell	Buster Lloyd
2001	Blow	Mr. T
2002	Mickey's House of Villains	Video; Pain (voice)
2002	Hansel and Gretel	Troll (voice)
2003	Grind	Bell Clerk
2005	A Halfway House Christmas	Narrator (voice)
2006	Leroy & Stitch	Nosy (voice)
2006	Sleeping Dogs Lie	Roy Orbison (uncredited)
2008	Goldthwait Home Movies	Short film; Robert Goldthwait
2009	World's Greatest Dad	The Limo Driver (uncredited)
2017	American Bigfoot	Himself (cameo)
2018	Henchmen	Jackalope (voice)
2021	Joy Ride	Himself; documentary

=== Television ===
Year	Title	Credit				Notes
Year	Title	Actor	Director	Writer	Producer	Notes
1985	Apt 2C	Yes				TV pilot by George Carlin; Bobby, neighbor
1986	The Vidiots	Yes				TV film; Herman Kraylor
1987	An Evening with Bobcat Goldthwait: Share the Warmth	Yes		Yes		Comedy special; Himself
1990–96	Tales from the Crypt	Yes				2 episodes Billy Goldman / Wolf (voice)
1992	Married... with Children	Yes				Episode: "Magnificent Seven"; Zemus
1992	The Golden Palace	Yes				Episode: "Promotional Considerations"; Gordon McRay Cosay
1992, 1995–96	Capitol Critters	Yes				13 episodes; Muggle
1993	Are You Afraid of the Dark?	Yes				Episode: "The Tale of the Final Wish"; Sandman
1993	Herman's Head	Yes				Episode: "Jay Is for Jealousy"; Suzie's Jealousy
1993	Eek! The Cat	Yes				Episode: "It's a Very Merry Eek's-mas"; Blizten (voice)
1993–95	The Moxy Show	Yes		Yes		Moxy (voice)
1994	The John Larroquette Show	Yes				Episode: "The Big Slip"; Boss's Nephew
1994	Dave's World	Yes				Episode: "Sorry Seems to Be the Hardest Word"
1994–95	Duckman	Yes				2 episodes Cinque / Wino / Indian
1994–2001	Space Ghost Coast to Coast	Yes				4 episodes; Himself
1995	ER	Yes				Episode: "Feb 5, '95"; Mr. Conally
1995	Beavis and Butt-Head	Yes				2 episodes; Bum
1995	Out There	Yes				TV film; Cobb
1995–99	Unhappily Ever After	Yes		Yes		Mr. Floppy
1996	Living Single	Yes				2 episodes; Mugger
1996	Arli$$	Yes				Episode: "How to Turn a Minus Into a Plus"; Himself
1996	The Tick	Yes				Episode: "The Tick vs. Education"; Uncle Creamy (voice)
1997	Dr. Katz, Professional Therapist	Yes				Episode: "Studio Guy"; Bob (voice)
1997	Mad TV					1 episode; Host
1997	Sabrina, the Teenage Witch	Yes				Episode: "Oh What a Tangled Spell She Weaves"; Merlin
1998	Hollywood Squares					Himself
1998	The Simpsons	Yes				Season 9 Episode 15: " The Last Temptation of Krust"
1998	The Army Show	Yes				Episode: "Have I Got a Deal for You"; Used Car Salesman
1998–99	Hercules: The Animated Series	Yes				22 episodes; Pain (voice)
1998–99	Penn & Teller's Sin City Spectacular	Yes				2 episodes
2000	Strip Mall		Yes			
2000	Buzz Lightyear of Star Command					5 episodes; XL (voice)
2000–03	The Man Show		Yes			42 episodes (additional segments)
2001–02	House of Mouse	Yes				5 episodes; Pain (voice)
2002–03	Crank Yankers	Yes	Yes			Steven Goldstein (voice)
2003	That '70s Show	Yes				Episode: "The Battle of Evermore"; Eli
2003	Chappelle's Show	Yes	Yes			Directed 4 episodes; Himself
2003	CSI: Crime Scene Investigation	Yes				Episode: "Last Laugh"; Michael Borland
2003	Windy City Heat	Yes	Yes			TV film; The Director
2003–06	Lilo & Stitch: The Series	Yes				4 episodes; Nosy (voice)
2004	Non-Denominational All-Star; Celebrity Holiday Special		Yes			
2004–07	Jimmy Kimmel Live!		Yes			Directed 267 episodes; Himself
2007	Random! Cartoons	Yes				Episode: "Squirly Town"; Zoopie
2009	Back at the Barnyard	Yes				Episode: "Halloween Special"; Hockey Mask Bob (voice)
2009	Just for Laughs			Yes		Episode: "Gerry Dee"
2010	Important Things with Demetri Martin		Yes			Directed 8 episodes
2010	I Confess	Yes				TV film; Bishop Goldthwarp
2010	That's How We Do It!		Yes			Comedy special
2011–12	Fish Hooks	Yes				2 episodes; "Fish Santa/Roy and Bea's Pillow" (voices)
2012	Bobcat Goldthwait: You Don't Look the Same Either.			Yes		Comedy special; Himself
2012	Adventure Time	Yes				Episode: "Web Weirdos"; Ed (voice)
2012	Randy Cunningham: 9th Grade Ninja	Yes				Episode: "Stank'd to the Future/Wave Slayers"; Dickie (voice)
2013	Regular Show	Yes				Episode: "The Heart of a Stuntman"; Johnny Crasher (voice)
2013	Aqua Teen Hunger Force	Yes				Episode: "Storage Zeebles"; Zingo (voice)
2013	Maron	Yes	Yes			Episode: "Projections"; Himself; Directed 11 episodes
2013–20	Bob's Burgers	Yes				Episode: "Christmas in the Car"; Gary (voice) & Episode: "Drumforgiven"; Dino (voice)
2014	Patton Oswalt: Tragedy Plus Comedy Equals Time		Yes			Comedy special
2014	Morgan Murphy: Irish Goodbye				Yes	Comedy special
2014	Robert Kelly: Live at the Village Underground		Yes		Yes	Comedy special
2015	Community		Yes			Episode: "Basic Crisis Room Decorum"
2015	Eugene Mirman: Vegan on His Way to the Complain Store		Yes			Comedy special
2015	Marc Maron: More Later		Yes			Comedy special
2016	Cameron Esposito: Marriage Material		Yes			Comedy special
2016	Gary Gulman: It's About Time		Yes		Yes	Comedy special
2016	Iliza: Confirmed Kills		Yes			Comedy special
2016	Those Who Can't		Yes			Directed six episodes
2016	Future-Worm!	Yes				Episode: "Meetiversary/Steak Starbolt/The Very Hungry Killa-Pillah" role: Dr. Wolfman (voice)
2016–18	Skylanders Academy	Yes				Role: Pop Fizz (voice)
2017	Patton Oswalt: Annihilation		Yes			Comedy special
2017	Love You More		Yes	Yes	Yes	Amazon Pilot Season Episode 1
2018	Bobcat Goldthwait's Misfits & Monsters		Yes	Yes	Yes	Television series
2018	Spy Kids: Mission Critical	Yes				Episode: "Secrets & Spies"; JT/The Worm (voice)
2019	Summer Camp Island	Yes				Role: Oscar (Sasquatch Monk's voice)
2019	Ron Funches: Giggle Fit		Yes			
2020	AJ and the Queen		Yes			Episode: "Columbus"
2021	DC Super Hero Girls	Yes				
2021–22	He-Man and the Masters of the Universe	Yes				Television series Role: Gary the Dragonfly (voice)
2023	The Patrick Star Show	Yes				Episode: "A Root Galoot"; Role: Shmandrake, Baby Shmandrake (voice)

=== Video games ===
Year	Title	Role	Notes
1993	LINKS 386 Pro	Golf commentary	
1995	Cartoon Network 'Toon Jam!	Moxy	
1997	Hercules	Pain	
1998	Disney's Animated Storybook: Hercules	Pain	
2000	Buzz Lightyear of Star Command	XL	
2012–2016	Skylanders	Pop Fizz	
2026	Mewgenics	Cats	Creature role
