= Call Me Lucky =

- Official poster
- Directed by: Bobcat Goldthwait
- Produced by: Charlie Fonville; Clinton Trucks
- Starring: Barry Crimmins; Patton Oswalt; David Cross; Steven Wright; Baratunde Thurston; Mike Donovan; Lenny Clarke; Jimmy Tingle; Jack Gallagher; Martin Olson; Margaret Cho; Marc Maron
- Cinematography: Bradley Stonesifer
- Edited by: Jeff Striker
- Music by: Lo Mutuc
- Production company: Type 55 Films
- Distributed by: MPI Media Group
- Release date: August 7, 2015
- Running time: 106 minutes
- Country: United States
- Language: English

Call Me Lucky is a 2015 American documentary film directed by Bobcat Goldthwait about the life of satirist, author, and performer Barry Crimmins.

== Synopsis ==
Call Me Lucky details the life of stand-up comedian and activist Barry Crimmins, from his roots in upstate New York to his work as a political satirist and advocate. The film celebrates Crimmins' courage and dedication to truth-telling, highlighting his fight against child pornography on the Internet. Crimmins is portrayed as an influential figure in the Boston stand-up comedy scene, known for his profane and angry rants, primarily targeting the U.S. government and the Catholic Church. The documentary reveals that his rage stems from his childhood sexual abuse, a traumatic experience that fuels his activism. A significant moment in the film is Crimmins' testimony at a 1995 congressional hearing, where he confronts an AOL executive about the company's failure to regulate pedophile activity in its chat rooms.

== Production ==
Filming began in January 2014 in Boston and Crimmins' home in upstate New York. Principal photography wrapped in August 2014.

== Reception ==
The film premiered on January 7, 2015, at the Sundance Film Festival in the Documentary Competition program. It went on to play over a dozen festivals around the US and was released theatrically on August 7, 2015.

Review aggregator Rotten Tomatoes reports that 85% of 26 film critics have given the film a positive review, with a rating average of 7.6 out of 10.

AV Club critic Mike D'Angelo wrote "If it accomplishes nothing else, the new documentary Call Me Lucky should bring some welcome attention to a man who's been under the radar for the past few decades, mostly by his own design." Stephen Holden of the New York Times wrote "An earnest homage that also honors Mr. Crimmins's crusade to drive child pornography off the Internet."
