= When Stand Up Stood Out =

- DVD cover
- Directed by: Fran Solomita
- Written by: Fran Solomita
- Produced by: Chad Sahley
- Starring: Fran Solomita; Lenny Clarke; Janeane Garofalo; Bob Goldthwait; Denis Leary; Paula Poundstone; Colin Quinn; Steven Wright
- Distributed by: THINKFilm (DVD)
- Release date: 2003
- Running time: 78 minutes
- Country: United States
- Language: English

When Stand Up Stood Out is a documentary film by former Boston comedian Fran Solomita which chronicles the explosive popularity of the Boston Stand-up comedy scene in the 80s and early 90s. It was released on DVD on June 20, 2006 by THINKFilm, the distributor behind the documentary The Aristocrats.

== Synopsis ==
Produced by Chad Sahley, the film portrays the smart yet gritty comedy of Boston, a veritable melting pot of people of very different backgrounds: the multi-ethnic working class and the hip, learned college crowd. In an interview for the film, Solomita commented that "Those two things right next to each other created an odd vibe - really smart people who also understand a dollar earned. The comedy just sort of percolated."

Along with its joyful 'insider' look at comedy (Solomita performed at the Ding Ho for 2 years in his youth), the film also explores the darker side of the scene. Cocaine, the glamor drug of choice of the 1980s, was a problem in the circles of performers and club owners. Equally bad was the cut-throat competition between the clubs themselves.

One of the film's most gripping sequences is the story of Steven Wright's appearance on The Tonight Show on 6 August 1982. Apparently, Carson was so impressed with Wright that he invited him to sit down on the couch, an occurrence almost unheard of for first time guests. The event is presented as a boiling point; when the brash, rowdy, innovative Boston scene of the early 80s finally broke into the national spotlight.

== Features ==
The film features original footage from two of the Boston area's most renowned comedy clubs: The Comedy Connection in Quincy Market, and the club which operated at The Ding Ho in Inman Square in Cambridge. Some of this footage was obtained via one of the film's producers, Doug Miller, who worked for Channel 5 and frequented the comedy clubs with his camera. Still other footage from the era came courtesy of DJ Hazard.

Also notable are the interviews with many comics who got their start in Boston, including Kevin Meaney, Denis Leary, Steven Wright, Janeane Garofalo, Bobcat Goldthwait, Paula Poundstone, Don Gavin, Kenny Rogerson, Jimmy Tingle, Barry Crimmins, and Lenny Clarke at locations which include The Comedy Studio and The Comedy Connection.
