= Dorst (surname) =

Dorst is a surname of Dutch origin (meaning thirst), and may refer to:

- Christopher Dorst (born 1956), American water polo player
- Doug Dorst (early–21st c.), American novelist, short story writer, and creative writing instructor
- H. Dorst (mid–20th c.), Indonesian football player
- Jean Dorst (1924–2001), French ornithologist.
- Marybeth Linzmeier Dorst (born 1963), American swimmer
- Tankred Dorst (1925–2017), German playwright and storyteller

== See also ==
- Durst (surname)
