= New Amsterdam (2008 TV series) =

American drama television series

- Intertitle for New Amsterdam
- Genre: Drama; Fantasy; Police procedural
- Created by: Allan Loeb; Christian Taylor
- Starring: Nikolaj Coster-Waldau; Alexie Gilmore; Stephen Henderson; Zuleikha Robinson; Susan Misner
- Composer: Mychael Danna
- Country of origin: United States
- Original language: English
- No. of seasons: 1
- No. of episodes: 8

Production
- Executive producers: Allan Loeb; David Manson; Christian Taylor; Leslie Holleran; Steven Pearl; Lasse Hallström
- Producers: Margo Myers Massey; Barry Pullman; Michael Hausman
- Running time: 43 minutes
- Production companies: Sarabande Productions; Scarlet Fire Productions; Hallstrom Holleran Productions; Regency Television

Original release
- Network: Fox
- Release: March 4 – April 14, 2008

New Amsterdam is an American drama television series which aired for eight episodes in 2008 on Fox. The series starred Nikolaj Coster-Waldau as "John Amsterdam" (real name Johann van der Zee), an immortal Dutch man born in 1607, who has lived in New York City on and off since he was 14 years old, and who 'partners' with a female homicide detective in the present day. The series was nominated for an Emmy for Main Title Design.

== Premise and plot ==
John Amsterdam (Nikolaj Coster-Waldau) is an NYPD homicide detective who is 400 years old, but has the appearance of a 35-year-old. He was a Dutch soldier in Manhattan in the year 1642, when he stepped in front of a sword to save the life of a Native American girl during the massacre of her tribe. The girl in turn rescued Amsterdam by weaving a spell that conferred immortality upon him. It was also prophesied that he would not age until he finds his one true love, and only then will he become whole and ready for mortality. Flashbacks in different episodes of the show reveal Amsterdam's centuries of life since, using many names, though usually retaining "John", marked by loss as his friends, lovers, children (63), and dogs gradually grow old and die. Amsterdam is a recovering alcoholic who regularly attends Alcoholics Anonymous meetings, having remained sober since 1965. In his lifetime he has joined the Army three times, in addition to the Coast Guard, Marines, and Navy. He stated that he never joined the Air Force because he "doesn't like heights". He has taught history at a university, served as a physician during the American Civil War, was a furniture maker at the turn of the 20th century, a portrait painter just before the outbreak of World War I, and by 1941 an attorney. At some point he attended Columbia University and served in the CIA. (See below for a detailed timeline.)

New Amsterdam cast (L–R): Henderson, Robinson, Coster-Waldau & Gilmore

Amsterdam's quest to find his "true love" drives the series. But in each episode as a policeman he has crimes to solve, which he does using his deep and often personal knowledge of history, depicted as flashbacks. Though estranged from and unknown to most of his many descendants, except his 65-year-old son Omar, he tries to keep track of them and aids them when possible.

The title sequence is a time lapse series of images of the place where Amsterdam received his "gift", from the forests and Native American camps of the 17th century which evolves into modern Times Square in the city of New York.

== Cast and characters ==
- Nikolaj Coster-Waldau as John Amsterdam, a New York homicide detective (badge number 9298)^{E-4} who will become mortal again after he finds his one true love. As a side effect of the immortality ritual, John has a rare Native American blood type (R_{Z}R_{Z}), with lethal levels of lead (120 μg/dL).^{E-1} His blood also clots quickly, with a platelet level ten times normal, despite very low levels of factor VIII.^{E-4} Later Dr. Dillane speculates that he may have pluripotent stem cells.^{E-8} He was born Johann van der Zee on June 1, 1607, in Amsterdam, Holland.^{E-2} Amsterdam is only the latest of the aliases John has used, changing identities as often as once a decade.^{E-4}
- Zuleikha Robinson as Eva Marquez, Amsterdam's new partner. She attended SUNY Binghamton.^{E-2} Her brother is also a police officer,^{E-1} and her father is police Chief Eddie Marquez.^{E-6} Her mother is a history teacher at Queens College.^{E-3}
- Alexie Gilmore as Dr. Sara Millay Dillane, a Cornell graduate who lives in the West Village, within walking distance of St. Francis Hospital where she is an emergency room physician.^{E-3} Dr. Dillane pronounces Amsterdam dead after a heart attack, and he is convinced that she is "the one" (his soulmate). This is complicated by the revelation that she has been married for four years to Robert Camp, although they are currently separated.^{E-4} Sara initiates a divorce because her husband was having an ongoing affair.^{E-6}^{/}^{E-7}
- Stephen Henderson as Omar York, who owns a jazz club named Omar's: Bar–Grill, and is John's 65-year-old son with schoolteacher Lily Rae Brown,^{E-2} an African American woman. He is named after Omar Khayyám.

== Episodes ==
No.	Title	Directed by	Written by	Original release date	Prod. code
1	"Pilot"	Lasse Hallström	Story by : Allan Loeb & Christian Taylor; Teleplay by : Christian Taylor	March 4, 2008	101
The series premiere introduces a brilliant New York homicide detective with a profound secret: he is immortal. In response to a heroic action, John Amsterdam will not age a day until he finds "the one." He has had many lives as he has roamed the city of New York for the past 400 years searching for his one true love. Amsterdam's new partner, Eva Marquez, can't wait to be transferred out of homicide, but in the meantime she has to put up with a truly know-it-all partner. Omar is the only one who knows Amsterdam's secret and he's got one of his own. In this episode, a murdered socialite causes John Amsterdam to cross paths with his past and it nearly kills him.
2	"Golden Boy"	John David Coles	David Manson	March 6, 2008	102
Amsterdam and Eva investigate the suspicious death of a student at a prestigious New York City private school which leads to the revelation of a twisted "affair." One of Amsterdam's biggest secrets is revealed, when Amsterdam flashes back to 1941.
3	"Soldier's Heart"	Bobby Roth	Eric Overmyer	March 10, 2008	103
A homeless Gulf War veteran confesses to the grisly murder of a controversial psychiatrist, but Amsterdam is skeptical. While reviewing the psychiatrist's soon-to-be published book, Amsterdam contemplates the reliability of memories and the reasons people bury them. Could the motive for this murder lie in the psychiatrist's own research? The murder also brings Amsterdam closer to finding "the one" who he believes will unlock his heart and make him mortal. Though he's certain the sparks he feels are real, he encounters the unexpected.
4	"Honor"	Ken Girotti	David Manson	March 17, 2008	104
John Amsterdam is called in to investigate the rape of an Indian fashion designer, Amartya Vikram, who is reluctant to testify against her attacker. She finally does so over the objections of her conservative family, but the rapist, Phillip Long, is freed on a technicality. After Long apparently murders Amartya for revenge, John must ensure the killer is brought to justice while dealing with memories of his own past and another time he confronted a rapist in the year 1813.
5	"Keep The Change"	Jim McKay	John Mankiewicz	March 24, 2008	105
John and Eva investigate the death of a homeless man whose best friend believes that his overdose was actually a homicide. They uncover a mysterious connection between the new homeless shelter and an expensive guitar (a Gibson L-00 once belonging to Robert Johnson) the dead homeless man kept in his locker. Meanwhile, John remembers when he struggled with addictions and entered a 12-step program back in 1964 after passing out drunk one too many times and ending up in the psych ward. Also, Sara begins to believe that John is hiding a secret from her.
6	"Legacy"	John David Coles	Barry Pullman	March 31, 2008	106
When police find a bullet-ridden body in an apartment in Chinatown, where Donald Chen leads New York's Tong gang. John and Eva are called to investigate, and it is revealed that John knows that Chen's great-grandfather was a police informant. The deceased young man's striking similarity to Roosevelt—a son John lost contact with c. 1912—prompting him to take a personal interest in the case. The search for the killer leads John to the Spoors, a violent crime family headed by Roosevelt's descendants. The discovery makes John question the actions of his past and the reverberating consequences they have on those around him.
7	"Reclassified"	Jean de Segonzac	Eric Overmyer	April 7, 2008	108
John becomes fixated on granting the dying wish of his first partner, Andy Gleason, who is slowly wasting away from leukemia caused by a bullet lodged in his heart. Andy wants the unknown shooter brought to justice before he dies, but the case is more convoluted than anyone originally believes. Memories of John's beginnings as a homicide detective help him not only piece together clues to his friend's case, but also prompt John to realize he may be nearing the end of his quest for love and mortality. However, he embarks down a precarious path as his investigation leads to altercations with the Russian mafia and culminates with a shocking end.
8	"Love Hurts"	Matthew Penn	Story by : David Manson & Ashley Gable; Teleplay by : David Manson	April 14, 2008	107
In the season finale John, still recovering from his recent gunshot wound, and Eva investigate the death of a drowned woman. The death might be related to a string of robberies of wealthy men linked to a dating service. The case causes John to flashback to his life in 1927 when as a grifter, he stole jewelry from his lover. Upset over still being apparently immortal, John breaks it off with Sara Dillane.

== Production ==
New Amsterdam was created by Allan Loeb and Christian Taylor, who also served as executive producers alongside David Manson, Leslie Holleran, Steven Pearl and Lasse Hallström. The latter also directed the pilot. Produced by Laha Films, Regency Television, Sarabande Productions and Scarlet Fire Entertainment, the series was greenlit and given a thirteen-episode order on May 11, 2007. The series was scheduled to premiere in the fall of 2007, consequently airing on Tuesday nights at 8:00/7:00c on Fox, but it was held as a mid-season replacement and began airing in March 2008.

On Tuesday, October 16, 2007, an article in The Hollywood Reporter stated that production on New Amsterdam had been stopped for an indefinite period, with "seven episodes of the series in the can". The article also mentioned that Fox decided to review the series and then decide whether or not to order new episodes, something that the article writer asserted was considered to be unlikely. A pre-air version of the Pilot episode was leaked onto internet file-sharing services on December 2, 2007.

On January 23, 2008, Fox resumed airing commercials for the show stated "coming soon". Following the premiere another preview episode aired on March 6, 2008 (at 9:00 pm/8:00 PM Central), before the series moved to its regular timeslot on March 10, 2008. The series also aired on Global in Canada. Global ran the first episode one hour before the U.S. broadcast, and the second episode one day before the U.S. broadcast.

On May 11, 2008, it was announced that Fox had decided to cancel New Amsterdam. The show was nominated for a 2008 Emmy Award for Main Title Design, but lost to Mad Men.

== Timeline ==
Date	Episode	Events
1607, June 1	2	Johann van der Zee is born on June 1, 1607, in Amsterdam, the Netherlands.^{E-2}
1620	5	Johann comes to the New World at age 14.^{E-5} (This is inconsistent by one year with his given birth date.)
1642	1, 3	Johann is stabbed through the heart saving the life of a native girl. She and the women shaman of her Lenape^{E-3} village (located at present day Times Square)^{E-1} save his life, and in so doing make him immortal. He will not die or age until after he finds "the one", his soul mate.^{E-1}
c. 1760s	3	John teaches history at Columbia University during the period in which it is called King's College.^{E-3}
c. 1776–1781	4	John serves with Whitcomb's Rangers during the Revolutionary War.^{E-4}
1812	4	The Ursulines arrive in New York from Cork.^{E-4}
1813	4	John is a coachman in the Bronx for Andrew Durst who forcibly deflowers his female servants; including Fanny, who had been preserving her virginity for John. John kills Durst in a duel and, because the latter was of a higher social class, the protagonist abandons his identity for a time.^{E-4}
c. 1850	1, 7	John takes the first of around 160 pictures—each dated with the year taken—covering the development of what is later called Times Square.^{E-7} (Pictures shown include: 1878–80, 1890, 1893, 1899–1903, 1906–07, 1911–12, 1915, 1925–26, 1932, 1935, 1937, 1941, 1943, 1945, 1948, 1950, 1955, 1959, 1977–78, 1980–1982, 1985, 2006, & 2007. Years shown to be missing include: 1891–92, 1908–10, 1913–14, 1933–34, 1936, 1942, 1946–47, 1949.)^{E-1}
1862, September 17	3	John is a Union Army surgeon at the Battle of Antietam during the American Civil War. He is assisted by Walt Whitman, who gives John a first edition of Leaves of Grass.^{E-3}
1865, April	5	John helps chase down John Wilkes Booth.^{E-5}
late 19th century	5	John has a relationship with Emily Dickinson.^{E-5}
c. 1891	2	John marries, and has a daughter named "Em" (short for Maggie).^{E-2}
1893	6	John takes on the alias "Dutch" Amsterdam, a painter, and marries again, this time to Samantha.^{E-6}
1894	6	Roosevelt "Rosie" Amsterdam, son of Dutch and Samantha, is born.^{E-6}
1900	6	During the wars between the Hip Sing Tong and the Four Brothers, a Mr. Chen was a police informant.^{E-6}
c. 1900	5	Stanford White designed the Dillane mansion, "the biggest private house on Park Avenue".^{E-5}
c. 1900	1	John knows the actress Sarah Bernhardt at the "turn of the 20th century."^{E-1}
1903	1	As J. G. Benwaar, John is a well known furniture maker.^{E-1}
1912 / 1913	6	Dutch and his family are living in Greenwich Village. His wife and son leave Dutch after he has an affair with one of his models, Alice Crayborn.^{E-6} (John's family tree says they left in 1912, an on-screen title dates the event to 1913.)^{E-6}
1913	2	Lily Rae Brown is born.^{E-2}
c. 1917	5, 8	John fights in France during World War I.^{E-5} He is wounded and undergoes contrology therapy during his recovery and rehabilitation.^{E-8}
1920s	1	The Penmar is a speakeasy during prohibition, and John is a regular.^{E-1}
1927	8	"Johnny on the Spot" is running scams near Hell Gate as a grifter, his thieving is destroying a new relationship with actress Olivia Behrendt (formerly Paula Dorn from Grand Rapids, Michigan).^{E-8}
1930s	1	John, using the name Charlie, is dating a painter named Julianne. She paints his image into a mural named The Lover's Sacrifice in the Presidential Suite at the Davenshire Hotel.^{E-1}
1941	2	As John York, Esq. ("born" January 6, 1904, in New York City), he is practising law, and having a secret relationship with Lily Rae Brown. John's secretary is his daughter Em. The Rubaiyat of Omar Khayyam is one of his favorite books, and his dog is named "Twenty nine." Under pressure from her father, Lily later breaks off the affair. York joins the army and is assigned to the "Big Red One".^{E-2}
1942	2	John and Lily have a son they name Omar, and they get married.^{E-2}
1944 June	1	During the Invasion of Normandy John temporarily loses his hearing when a shell explodes "too close for comfort."^{E-1}
1945	2	Lily Rae York dies.^{E-2}
After 1947	6	John serves in the CIA for 10 years.^{E-6}
c. 1950s	5, 6	During the Cold War John blackmails his superior in a government agency.^{E-5}^{E-6}
1957	1	Thelonious Monk buys one of John's desks, after a show with Coltrane.^{E-1}
1964 February	5	John, working as a night club comedian, drinks enough to kill a normal human and ends up in a mental institution. After leaving, he enters Alcoholics Anonymous, and when his AA sponsor Frank dies unexpectedly of a heart attack (93 days after Ruby shoots Oswald), John confesses his secrets to Omar instead.^{E-5}
1965	1	John has his last drink, beginning 15,495 days of sobriety as of the pilot episode.^{E-1}
1967, July 17	1	Coltrane dies, still mad at John.^{E-1}
2002, February	4, 5, 7	John takes on the John Amsterdam alias.^{E-4}^{E-5} He joins the NYPD because of the September 11, 2001 attacks and achieves the rank of Detective in the shortest time in NYPD history.^{E-7}

As of the pilot, John has had 609 girlfriends, a few wives, and 63 children. His current dog is Thirty-six.^{E-1}^{/}^{E-5} John keeps a detailed family tree of all his wives and known descendants.^{E-6} His military service includes "the Army three times, Marines, Navy, Coast Guard...not the Air Force - don't like heights."^{E-3}

John's descendants shown or mentioned in the series include:

- John's daughter, Maggie (born c. 1891), known as "Em". In 1941 she is working as John's secretary.^{E-2}
- John's son, Roosevelt "Rosie" Amsterdam (born 1894).^{E-6}
  - Rosie's son, Theo Spoor. The retired boss of one of New York's mob families.^{E-6} The Spoor family owns Dutch's Painting of Alice, which they keep at the Spoor Brewery.^{E-6}
    - Theo's grandson, Nicholas Spoor. The current boss of the mob family, and an FBI informant.^{E-6}
    - Theo's grandson, Piers Spoor. Murdered by Nicholas to hide the FBI details.^{E-6}
    - Theo's grandson, Alex Spoor. Murdered by Nicholas to hide the FBI details.^{E-6}
- John's son, Omar York (born 1942).^{E-1}
  - Omar's daughter, Hallie.^{E-2}
    - Hallie's young son, Corey.^{E-2}

== Reception ==
No.	Episode	Air date	Rating	Share	Rating/share (18–49)	Viewers (millions)	Rank: Timeslot	Rank: Night	Rank: Overall
1	"Pilot"	March 4, 2008	8.2	12	4.5/11	13.47	1	2	6
2	"Golden Boy"	March 6, 2008	6.2	10	3.5/8	10.12	2	4	15
3	"Soldier's Heart"	March 10, 2008	5.5	8	2.5/6	8.78	3	6	20
4	"Honor"	March 17, 2008	4.5	7	2.3/6	7.30	4	10	37
5	"Keep The Change"	March 24, 2008	3.8	6	2.0/5	6.19	4	11	52
6	"Legacy"	March 31, 2008	4.3	6	2.1/5	6.63	4	10	43
7	"Reclassified"	April 7, 2008	4.6	7	2.2/5	7.44	4	—N/a	37
8	"Love Hurts"	April 14, 2008	4.2	6	2.1/5	6.77	4	12	43

== Works with a similar premise ==
The background idea behind the show, a present-day immortal who changes aliases to avoid detection, has been used elsewhere. After hearing about the upcoming series, author Pete Hamill alleged that the show has similarities to the plot of his 2003 novel, Forever, but producer David Manson claimed he had no knowledge of the book until after filming had wrapped.

Other productions with similar foundations are the 2007 film The Man from Earth (written in 1998); the ongoing Highlander franchise, which began in 1986; Forever Knight, a 1992 Canadian show about a vampire detective (which includes in each episode a flashback to previous years); and Forever, a U.S. television series that aired in 2014. The premise was used as early as 1969, in the Star Trek episode "Requiem for Methuselah".

An unrelated 2007 book also called New Amsterdam, by the fantasy and science fiction writer Elizabeth Bear, features an immortal vampire detective partnering with a forensic sorcerer to solve occult crimes in an alternate universe. Many of the issues John deals with are covered by Robert A. Heinlein's Lazarus Long series of books, specifically the melancholy of immortality and the sense of loss that accumulated through the death of loved ones (after Time Enough for Love).
