= Jason Stewart =

Jason Stewart may refer to:

- Jason Stewart (American football) (born 1980), American football defensive tackle
- Jason Stewart (runner) (born 1981), New Zealand middle-distance runner
- Jason Stewart (film editor) (born 1971), American film editor

== See also ==
- Jason Stuart (disambiguation)
