= Willow Creek (film) =

- Theatrical release poster
- Directed by: Bobcat Goldthwait
- Written by: Bobcat Goldthwait
- Produced by: Sarah de Sa Rego; Aimee Pierson
- Starring: Alexie Gilmore; Bryce Johnson
- Cinematography: Evan Phelan
- Edited by: Stephen Thurston; Jason Stewart
- Production company: JerkschoolProductions
- Distributed by: Dark Sky Films
- Release dates: April 29, 2013 (BIFF); June 6, 2014 (United States)
- Running time: 80 minutes
- Country: United States
- Language: English

Willow Creek is a 2013 found footage horror film written and directed by Bobcat Goldthwait. It stars Alexie Gilmore and Bryce Johnson as a couple who venture into the woods of Willow Creek, California, in search of material for their documentary on Bigfoot lore.

== Plot ==
Set in Humboldt County, California, Jim (Bryce Johnson), a stout believer in Bigfoot, and his girlfriend Kelly (Alexie Gilmore), a skeptic, travel to Six Rivers National Forest in Northern California, where Jim plans to shoot his own Bigfoot footage at the site of the Patterson–Gimlin film.

The two stop at Willow Creek, the Bigfoot capital of the world, where Jim interviews various locals about Bigfoot. At a restaurant, they notice a missing woman on a poster on the wall. While heading into the forest in search of the Patterson–Gimlin filming location, they encounter a man who angrily tells them to leave, but Jim and Kelly ignore him. They set a camp in the middle of the woods and go for a swim. Upon their return, they find the camp trashed. That evening, Jim proposes to Kelly, but feeling that it is too soon, decides they should move in together instead and they go to sleep.

That night they are awakened by mysterious sounds echoing through the woods, and whooping vocalizations. Cowering inside their tent, they can hear large creatures moving about outside, pushing into and investigating the tent, as well as the distant sound of a woman crying. The noises grow closer and something hits their tent. Scared, the couple decides to leave at dawn. In the morning as they try to return home, Jim discovers a clump of gray fur. They wander for hours in circles through the thick woods while hearing the same noises they heard the night before. During the night, Jim and Kelly encounter the woman from the missing person poster in Willow Creek, nude. An unseen creature attacks them, killing Jim and abducting Kelly, whose cries for help are heard in the distance. The movie ends with three whooping vocalizations.

== Cast ==
- Alexie Gilmore as Kelly
- Bryce Johnson as Jim
- Peter Jason as an ex-Forest Ranger (credited as Ranger Troy Andrews)
- Laura Montagna as Missing Woman
- Bucky Sinister as Angry Man at Road
- Timmy Red as Ukulele Singer
- Steven Streufert as himself
- Shaun L. White Guy Sr. as herself
- Nita Rowley as herself
- Tom Yamarone as himself

== Production ==
Bobcat Goldthwait has said the following about the making of the film:

"This one was self-financed. We just went out and did it. It was very guerrilla style. I did have a lot of laughs on this one. The craziness of all of us camping out together. Even though all the movies I make are pretty down and dirty, this one was the smallest."

"I wrote a treatment and an outline. It was an 11-hour drive up to Willow Creek. During that drive, we just discussed the backstory and what the characters would be like, all that kind of stuff. Then once we got there, we had to film right away. People were nervous we wouldn't be able to make this whole movie in a week. I wanted to make sure I got the right locations. About a half a year before this, I took a 1400-mile roadtrip where I drove all around California going to all the Bigfoot hotspots."

"The whole crew and actors were about seven total. But then we had a couple of guys who were Bigfoot experts and they went out with us."

"People were on a need-to-know basis. I didn't explain that to the locals you see in the first half of the movie because I just wanted them to be natural, so they just did some interviews with the actors, and I let the actors drive it."

== Release and reception ==
The film was premiered at the 2013 Independent Film Festival Boston, and subsequently screened within such festivals as Maryland Film Festival.

Willow Creek has received generally positive reviews from critics. Review aggregation website Rotten Tomatoes gives the film a score of 80% based on 60 reviews. The website's consensus states: "Writer-director Bobcat Goldthwait's first foray into horror doesn't break any new ground, but it does wring fresh terror from a well-worn genre formula—and offers a few nasty laughs in the bargain." Metacritic, which uses a weighted average, assigned the film a score of 62 out of 100, based on 16 critics, indicating "generally favorable" reviews.
