= Amy Stewart (writer) =

American author

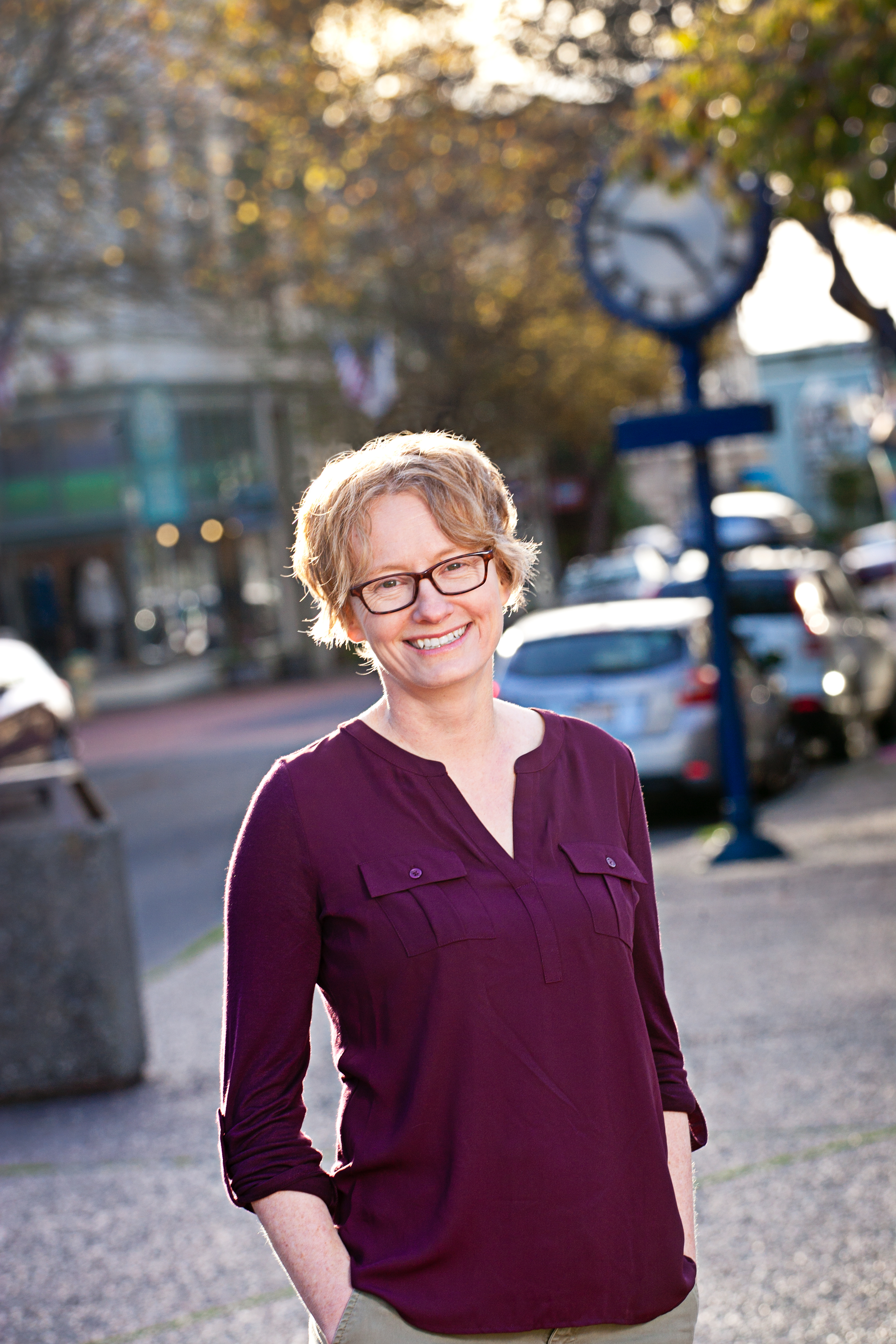
- Occupation: Writer
- Writing career
- Period: 2001–present
- Notable works: Wicked Plants and The Drunken Botanist
- Website: amystewart.com

Amy N. Stewart is an American author best known for books on horticulture and the natural world.

== Biography ==
Stewart grew up in Arlington, Texas, with her father, the musician Vic Stewart, who toured with Doc Severinsen’s road band; her mother, Dee Stewart, who had a career in public relations; and her younger brother, Jason Stewart, who is a film and television editor. She graduated from Arlington High School and received a B.A. degree in anthropology and a master's in community and regional planning (MSCRP) from the University of Texas at Austin. Stewart was a co-founder of the gardening blog Garden Rant.

She currently lives in Portland, Oregon.

Her poison plant garden in Eureka was included in Popular Mechanics's list of the 18 strangest gardens in the world.

== Books ==
- From the Ground Up: The Story of a First Garden. Algonquin Books (2001) ISBN 1-56512-240-2; St. Martin's Press (2001) ISBN 978-0-312-28767-2. A memoir of the author's experiences gardening in Santa Cruz, California.
- The Earth Moved: On the Remarkable Achievements of Earthworms (2004). Algonquin Books ISBN 1-56512-468-5. A natural history of the earthworm. This book earned the author a fellowship from the National Endowment for the Arts.
- Flower Confidential: The Good, the Bad, and the Beautiful (2008). Algonquin Books ISBN 978-1-56512-603-9. A survey of the global flower business. This book appeared on the extended New York Times bestseller list on March 4, 2007.
- Wicked Plants: The Weed That Killed Lincoln's Mother and Other Botanical Atrocities (2009). Algonquin Books ISBN 978-1-56512-683-1. Illustrated by Briony Morrow-Cribbs. A compendium of poisonous, invasive, and illegal plants. This book reached #8 on the New York Times bestseller list.
- Wicked Bugs: The Louse That Conquered Napoleon's Army & Other Diabolical Insects (2011). Algonquin Books ISBN 978-1-56512-960-3. Illustrated by Briony Morrow-Cribbs. A compendium of poisonous, painful, and invasive insects.
- The Drunken Botanist: The Plants That Create the World's Great Drinks (2013). Algonquin Books. ISBN 978-1-61620-046-6. Winner of the International Association of Culinary Professionals Judge's Award in 2014.
- Girl Waits With Gun (2015). Houghton Mifflin Harcourt. ISBN 978-0-544-40991-0. An historical novel based on the lives of Constance Kopp and her sisters Norma and Fleurette.
- Lady Cop Makes Trouble (2016). Houghton Mifflin Harcourt ISBN 978-0-544-40994-1. Second book in the Kopp Sisters series; a sequel to Girl Waits With Gun. Constance Kopp tracks down an escaped prisoner.
- Miss Kopp’s Midnight Confessions (2017). Houghton Mifflin Harcourt ISBN 978-0-544-40999-6. Third book in the Kopp Sisters series; Stewart addresses the practice of arresting young women on morality charges.
- Miss Kopp Just Won't Quit (2018). Houghton Mifflin Harcourt. ISBN 978-1-328-73651-2. The fourth book in the Kopp Sisters series follows Constance Kopp and her sisters during a contentious local election.
- Kopp Sisters on the March (2019). Houghton Mifflin Harcourt. ISBN 978-0-358-29964-6. In the fifth book in the Kopp Sisters series, Constance, Norma, and Fleurette go to a National Service School.
- Dear Miss Kopp (2021). Houghton Mifflin Harcourt. ISBN 978-0-358-09312-1. The sixth Kopp Sisters book, an epistolary novel set during World War I.
- Miss Kopp Investigates (2021). Houghton Mifflin Harcourt. ISBN 978-0-358-09311-4. In the seventh book in the Kopp Sisters series, the trio become private detectives.
