= Joey Pang =

Joey Pang (born in 1979 in Yunnan, China) is a female Chinese Tattoo artist based in Hong Kong, SAR China.

== Credibility ==
She is credited for having pioneered a specific brush-stroke technique that more closely mirrors the painting lines found within Chinese art. She is further known for her detailed painting aesthetics alongside color and layering techniques seen throughout her Asian mythology and abstract tattoo work.

== Career ==
Joey Pang trained in cosmetics, graphic design, Chinese painting, Chinese calligraphy, Thangka, and Japanese art before moving into tattooing. She studied body art for four years in Thailand, New Zealand, Switzerland, and China before founding her private studio, Tattoo Temple, in 2006. Her artwork and exhibitions have been featured on CNN, AP, Al Jazeera, Thomson Reuters, The Travel Channel, and numerous other media as well as industry-specific publications. In 2014, Joey Pang was featured in an international advertising campaign for Heineken / Tiger Beer. She is known to have tattooed multiple celebrities including Lewis Hamilton as well as Hong Kong's Candy Lo.

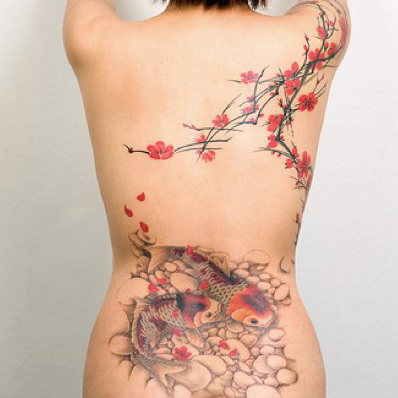

Pang has been involved in commercial design projects including collaborative collections with Indigo Living Hong Kong producing 'tattooed furniture', New Era, OA 1710, Tree Labs, Siglo, the Hong Kong Tourism Board, Legend Fighting Championship, and the Hong Kong Parkour Association.

== Tattoo Temple closure ==
Joey Pang suddenly closed down Tattoo Temple in early 2017 after splitting up with her husband and business partner Chris Anderson. Some customers flew from overseas to attend their tattoo sessions only to discover the studio had been closed down. Many customers have reported being unable to recover deposits paid in advance. Deposits for sessions started at $3500HKD (USD$450) with reported deposits lost as high as $17500HKD (USD$2251).

Anderson, who screened Pang's clients and handled her bookings before their separation told customers seeking compensation that he ended his relationship with the studio. He refuses to accept any liability for deposits paid by Pang's customers. On October 12, 2017 the Customs and Excise Department in Hong Kong reported a current investigation after stating they had arrested a 35-year-old male director "of a tattoo parlor suspected to have wrongly accepted payment" as well as that a Central-based studio had "failed to provide services to its customers who had paid for tattoo services." Meanwhile confused clients have created a Facebook group called "Where is Joey Pang?" to share their experience of lost money, undelivered and unfinished tattoos as well as complaints made to the customs department.

As of late September 2017, she said she had rebranded herself as "XinZhai Tatt Arts" and cited depression after her divorce and debt for her disappearance. The website is no longer active.
