= Sleeping Dogs Lie (2006 film) =

2006 American romantic black comedy film

- Theatrical release poster
- Directed by: Bobcat Goldthwait
- Written by: Bobcat Goldthwait
- Produced by: Martin Pasetta
- Starring: Melinda Page Hamilton; Bryce Johnson; Geoff Pierson; Colby French; Jack Plotnick; Bonita Friedericy
- Cinematography: Ian S. Takashi
- Edited by: Jason Stewart
- Music by: Gerald Brunskill
- Production company: HareBrained Films
- Distributed by: Roadside Attractions; Samuel Goldwyn Films
- Release dates: January 21, 2006 (Sundance); September 21, 2007 (United States)
- Running time: 88 minutes
- Country: United States
- Language: English
- Box office: $638,627

Sleeping Dogs Lie (originally titled Stay and released in the United Kingdom as Sleeping Dogs) is a 2006 American romantic black comedy film written and directed by Bobcat Goldthwait. It stars Melinda Page Hamilton as a woman whose relationships are damaged when she reluctantly reveals that she committed an act of bestiality with her dog while in college.

The film has been cited as a favorite by filmmaker John Waters, who presented it as his annual selection at the 2007 Maryland Film Festival.

== Plot ==
In college, 18-year-old Amy impulsively gave her dog, Rufus, oral sex. Eight years later, she lives a seemingly ordinary life as a schoolteacher and is engaged to nice-guy John. When John suggests complete honesty, Amy lies and tells him that she had a lesbian experience with her best friend Linda. On a trip to her parents' house, Amy finally relents to John's badgering and tells him. The next morning, Dougie, Amy's drug-addicted brother who had overheard the conversation, spills the beans at the breakfast table, and much to her parents' shock, Amy admits that he is right. Amy and John leave, as her father will not speak to her and her mother says that she is ashamed.

Once back, Amy and John's relationship is strained. Despite all their attempts to fix things, one night while drunk, John calls her a "dog-blowing cunt" and Amy decides to leave. She shacks up with Linda and her boyfriend Carl but leaves due to their noisy lovemaking. With the help of her co-worker Ed, Amy finds a new apartment and begins a relationship with Ed after he learns that his wife has been cheating on him.

After Amy's mother dies of an aneurysm, Amy returns home and reconciles with her father, who gives her a letter her mother had written her prior to her death. Amy and Ed visit Dougie in prison to inform him of their mother's death. He instantly begins to blame Amy, who leaves quickly before Ed can figure out what Dougie is trying to say. Sometime later, Ed and his wife are trying to work things out and Amy realizes her feelings for Ed. As it does not work out between Ed and his wife, Amy and he became a couple. Ed thinks he has discovered Amy's secret; she was pregnant and engaged to John but got an abortion and her parents were incensed. Amy decides to go with the lie, thus letting "sleeping dogs lie."

== Cast ==
- Melinda Page Hamilton as Amy
- Bryce Johnson as John
- Geoff Pierson as Donald, Amy's father
- Colby French as Ed
- Jack Plotnick as Douglas "Doug/Dougie"
- Bonita Friedericy as Amy's mother
- Brian Posehn as Randy, Dougie's dealer
- Morgan Murphy as Linda
- Steve Agee as Carl
- Bobcat Goldthwait as Roy Orbison

== Reception ==
Review aggregator website Rotten Tomatoes reported a 66% approval rating with an average rating of 6.2/10 based on 53 reviews. The website's consensus reads, "Though Sleeping Dogs Lie treats its subject and characters humanely, it's unable to overcome the low-budget production and Bobcat Goldthwait's pedestrian directing." Metacritic, which uses a weighted average, assigned the film a score of 63 out of 100, based on 13 critics, indicating "generally favorable" reviews.

The New York Times said in its review, "“Sleeping Dogs Lie” doesn't pretend to be more than it is: a blunt, provocative comedy sketch whose visual look is almost as bare as that of an episode of the underappreciated Home Box Office series “Lucky Louie.” The acting, especially by Ms. Hamilton, is better than serviceable. Almost everyone in the movie has a pet dog leering in the background."
