= Jason Stuart (disambiguation) =

Jason Stuart is an American actor and comedian.

Jason Stuart may also refer to:

- Jason Stuart (musician)

== See also ==
- Jason Stewart (disambiguation)
