= Shakes the Clown =

1992 American film

- Theatrical release poster
- Directed by: Bobcat Goldthwait
- Written by: Bobcat Goldthwait
- Produced by: Paul Colichman; Ann Luly-Goldthwait
- Starring: Bobcat Goldthwait; Blake Clark; Paul Dooley; Kathy Griffin; Florence Henderson; Tom Kenny; Adam Sandler; Scott Herriott; LaWanda Page; Jack Gallagher; Robin Williams
- Cinematography: Bobby Bukowski; Elliot Davis
- Edited by: J. Kathleen Gibson
- Music by: Tom Scott
- Distributed by: IRS Media
- Release dates: August 28, 1991 (Boston); March 13, 1992 (US)
- Running time: 87 minutes
- Country: United States
- Language: English
- Budget: $1.4 million
- Box office: $115,103

Shakes the Clown is a 1991 American black comedy film, written and directed by Bobcat Goldthwait, who performs the title role. It also features Julie Brown, Blake Clark, Paul Dooley, Kathy Griffin, Florence Henderson, Tom Kenny, Adam Sandler, Scott Herriott, LaWanda Page, Jack Gallagher, and a cameo by Robin Williams as Mime Jerry using the pseudonym "Marty Fromage".

The film is a satire of performance art and portrays different communities of clowns and other performers as clannish, rivalrous subcultures obsessed with precedence and status. Goldthwait made the film as a satire of the dysfunctional standup comedy circuit at the time he was first starting out as an entertainer. The film was widely panned upon its release, but in recent years, it has since become a cult classic, with particular focus on how the film handled the serious topic of alcoholism.

== Plot ==
In the fictional town of Palukaville, Shakes is a talented but cynical and alcoholic birthday-party clown. After his father died, Shakes was raised by his father's friend, Owen Cheese, who gave Shakes his job as a clown. At the local clown bar, the Twisted Balloon, Shakes is excited because he auditioned to be the host of a children's clown show on television called the Big Time Cartoon Circus, after its original host, Peppy, was forced into retirement due to a lewd act. Shakes is irate when he learns that he has been passed over for the position in favor of Binky, a cocaine-addicted clown who is a neurotic and vindictive psychopath.

Shakes's clown friends, Dink and Stenchy are concerned that he drinks too much and often encourage him to quit. On top of that, his alcoholism is damaging his relationship with his girlfriend Judy, a waitress in the Twisted Balloon and an aspiring professional bowler. Shakes continually denies the extent of his alcoholism until Cheese finally orders Shakes to sober up, or be fired. Shakes wants to make his father figure proud and is able to get through alcohol withdrawals, and for a time, seems to be doing well. However, Shakes suffers a relapse at a birthday party and trashes the house in a drunken rampage until he is knocked out by the child's mother.

Shakes returns to the bar later that night, where Cheese angrily fires him for upsetting the party guests. Abusive and heavily intoxicated, Shakes passes out and is put in the back room. Cheese decides to give Shakes another chance, and when he attempts to find him, instead comes across Binky, his sad clown friends, HoHo and Boots, and two drug-selling rodeo clowns, Ty and Randi, doing cocaine. Cheese is shocked and angered over the drugs, and a panicked Binky beats him to death with Shakes' juggling club in a fit of rage. Binky frames the unconscious Shakes for the murder.

Shakes goes on the run. Convinced of his innocence, Judy, Dink and Stenchy decide to help Shakes clear his name. Until he can find the truth, Shakes goes into hiding, posing as a hated mime in a class taught by the domineering Jerry the Mime. Shakes is concerned deep down that he may have actually committed the murder while blacked out and forgot. Later, Shakes, Dink and Stenchy go to a rodeo clown bar called the Broken Saddle, where they learn from the rodeo clowns that Cheese was actually murdered by Binky. Meanwhile, Binky attempts to rape Judy, who again rebuffs his advances. Binky again gets nervous and accidentally admits to Cheese's murder. Binky knows that he cannot let Judy leave with this information, so he kidnaps her and takes her to the studio where he attempts to kill her live on the air with throwing knives to make it look like an accident.

The rodeo clowns are arrested for their involvement, and Shakes, Dink and Stenchy fight Boots and HoHo, which ends with one of the clowns shooting Shakes. Shakes survives, as his flask stopped the bullet. Shakes, Dink and Stenchy arrive at the studio and fight Binky just in time to save Judy, and Binky is arrested for his crimes. Grateful that he saved her life, Judy gets back together with Shakes, and he promises her that he will stop drinking. Some time passes, and Shakes is shown attending an Alcoholics Anonymous meeting, sharing with the others that he is still sober and is proud of his accomplishment. With Binky in jail, Shakes is now the new host of the TV show, which proves to be a big hit with children. Shakes, Dink and Stenchy are the stars of the show and entertain the audience by chasing Jerry the Mime.

== Cast ==
- Bobcat Goldthwait as Shakes the Clown
- Julie Brown as Judy
- Adam Sandler as Dink the Clown
- Blake Clark as Stenchy the Clown
- Tom Kenny as Binky the Clown
- Paul Dooley as Owen Cheese
- Kathy Griffin as Lucy
- Robin Williams (as Marty Fromage) as Mime Jerry
- Paul Kozlowski as HoHo the Clown
- Dan Spencer as Boots the Clown
- Jeremy Kramer as Detective Boar
- Jack Gallagher as Officer Crony
- Bruce Baum as Ty the Rodeo Clown
- Greg Travis as Randi the Rodeo Clown
- Florence Henderson as The Unknown Woman
- Scott Herriott as Floor Director
- LaWanda Page as Female Clown Barfly
- Martin Charles Warner as Male Clown Barfly
- Johnny Silver as Clown Tailor
- Tim Kazurinsky as First Party Dad
- Sydney Lassick as Peppy the Clown
- Tony V. as Broken Saddle Bouncer
- Joel Murray as Milkman

== Reception ==
Shakes the Clown was not a financial success, earning an estimated $115,103 in ticket sales against an estimated budget of $1.4 million.

Critical reaction to the movie was mixed: Leonard Maltin gave it his lowest rating, while Betsy Sherman of The Boston Globe called it "the Citizen Kane of alcoholic clown movies". Roger Ebert gave the film two out of four stars, writing that while some isolated scenes were "very funny" the plot was scattered and the performances often seemed under-rehearsed. The film has a 43% rating on Rotten Tomatoes based on 21 reviews, with the consensus; "Shakes the Clown has a handful of memorable moments, but they're scattered in a movie whose best ideas were left undeveloped on their way to the screen."

Motion picture critic and historian Leonard Maltin gave STC a "BOMB" rating (his lowest), declaring it "An excruciating mishmash...Aimless and crude, this one induces more headaches than laughs."

The film was nominated for Worst Picture at the 1991 Stinkers Bad Movie Awards but lost to Nothing but Trouble.

In an interview with Conan O'Brien, Goldthwait revealed that Martin Scorsese had defended the movie from detractors. When a film critic derided the movie in order to make a point about good and bad movies, Scorsese revealed, "I like Shakes the Clown. Haven't you heard? It's the Citizen Kane of Alcoholic Clown Movies!"

== In popular culture ==
- A sample from this movie was used in the song "Interloper" by the heavy metal band Slipknot.
- The song "Binky the Doormat" by R.E.M., from the album New Adventures in Hi-Fi, is titled after a supporting character of this movie.
- In the song "Daddy Took Me to the Zoo (Theme from Dads)" by The Bogmen the movie is referenced in the line "We ended late with Shakes The Clown."
- The song "Goin' South" by Lagwagon opens with the sound bite "Binky have you ever been kicked in the head by a bull?" from the White Powdery Beef scene of the film between Binky and the Rodeo Clowns.
