= Surfer, Dude =

- Theatrical release poster
- Directed by: S.R. Bindler
- Written by: Mark Gustawes; George Mays; S.R. Bindler; Cory Van Dyke
- Produced by: Gus Gustawes; Mark Gustawes; Matthew McConaughey
- Starring: Matthew McConaughey; Alexie Gilmore; Scott Glenn; Jeffrey Nordling; Willie Nelson; Woody Harrelson; Sarah Wright
- Cinematography: Elliot Davis
- Edited by: Nancy Richardson
- Music by: Blake Neely
- Distributed by: Anchor Bay Entertainment
- Release date: September 5, 2008
- Running time: 85 minutes
- Country: United States
- Language: English
- Budget: $6 million
- Box office: $52,132

Surfer, Dude is a 2008 American comedy film directed by S.R. Bindler and starring Matthew McConaughey.

Woody Harrelson claims the film is the most "non-work" he has ever done. McConaughey and Harrelson, who previously appeared together in EDtv, later co-starred in HBO's True Detective.

== Premise ==
Surfer, Dude is the story of Steve Addington, a soul-searching surfer who experiences an existential crisis when no waves come for over a month. While the waves are not arriving, producers are trying to get him to join a reality show. He refuses joining the show because his main focus is surfing and he keeps searching for the waves along the coast of California. The waves end up coming back a month later.

== Cast ==
- Matthew McConaughey as Steve Addington
- Alexie Gilmore as Danni Martin
- Scott Glenn as Alister Greenbough
- Jeffrey Nordling as Eddie Zarno
- Nathan Phillips as Baker Smith
- Willie Nelson as Farmer Bob
- Woody Harrelson as Jack Mayweather
- Zachary Knighton as Brillo Murphy
- Ramón Rodríguez as Lupe La Rosa
- John Terry as Mercer Martin
- Sarah Wright as Stacey
- Todd Stashwick as Vic Hayes
- Travis Fimmel as Johnny Doran
- K. D. Aubert as April May
- Malena Maestas as Jack Mayweather’s Daughter
- Anaisa Maestas as Jack Mayweather’s Daughter

== Soundtrack ==
- "Star-Spangled Banner" – Performed by Matthew McConaughey and Blake Neely
- "Mother" – Xavier Rudd
- "Chasing the Dream" – Daniel Heath
- "Thump It" – Daniel Heath
- "Too Far Away" – Potent
- "This Is My Life" – Psideralica
- "Este Amor" (carnival version) – Bermudez Triangle
- "The High" – Deep Sonic
- "No Pants Required" – Nekal B.
- "Too Tired to Quit" – Nekal B.
- "Hip Hop Misfits" – The Dirty Heads
- "Coastline Journey" – Mishka
- "Virgin Lust" – Higore
- "Run and Play" – Potent
- "Come Let Go" – Xavier Rudd
- "Fuk It" – Xavier Rudd
- "3rd Eye Vision" – Mishka

== Reception ==
The film was critically panned upon release.

On review aggregator website Rotten Tomatoes, with 18 reviews, the film has a approval rating of 0%. At Metacritic the film has an average score of 16 out of 100 based on reviews from 6 critics.

Michael Ordona of the Los Angeles Times stated that "The film is awash in doobies and breasts, clichéd cinematic language and clumsy exposition. It's reminiscent of the stoner-culture movies of the late '60s and early '70s but without the naive fun." Stephen Farber of The Hollywood Reporter dismissed it as "[A] lackluster vanity production."
