= Barry Crimmins =

American political satirist (1953–2018)

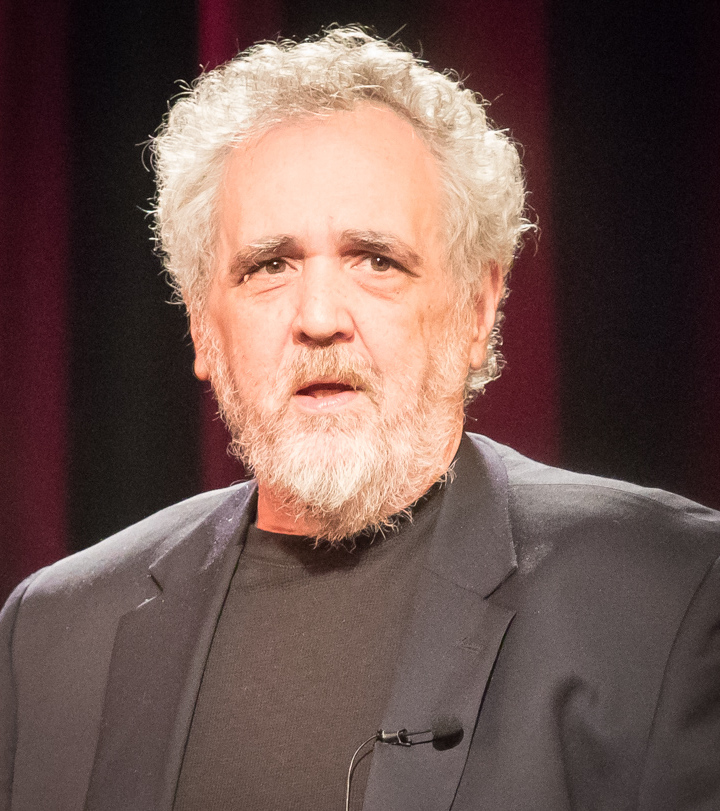
- Crimmins performing in January 2017
- Born: July 3, 1953; Kingston, New York, U.S.
- Died: February 28, 2018 (aged 64); Syracuse, New York, U.S.
- Occupations: Political satirist, comedian, activist
- Years active: 1971–2018
- Spouse: Helen Lysen (m. 2017)
- Website: barrycrimmins.org

Barry Francis Crimmins (July 3, 1953 – February 28, 2018) was an American stand-up comedian, political satirist, activist, author, Air America Radio writer and correspondent, and comedy club owner.

== Early life ==
Crimmins was born in Kingston, New York, to Margaret Hooe and Phillip Crimmins, a traveling salesman. When he was six, his family moved to Skaneateles, New York.

After graduating from high school in 1971, he started performing stand-up comedy at Under the Stone and later moved to Boston, Massachusetts, to pursue his comedic career.

== Career ==
=== Comedy clubs ===
In 1979, in Cambridge, Massachusetts, Crimmins co-founded The Ding Ho Comedy Club, at a Chinese Restaurant near Inman Square. His productions there included performances by comedians Steven Wright, Paula Poundstone, Bobcat Goldthwait, Kevin Meaney, Jimmy Tingle and many others.

In the 1980s, in Boston, Crimmins co-founded the comedy club, Stitches.

=== Writing and comedy ===
Crimmins' satirical writing and comedy routines focused on the need for political and social change. In the 1990s, in a more serious vein, he led a crusade against images of child abuse on the Internet, calling for police investigation of Internet service providers. He received the "Peace Leadership Award" from Boston Mobilization for Survival, and was honored by Community Works with the "Artist for Social Change Award" for his years of activism. Howard Zinn presented him with "The Courage of Conscience Award" from Wellesley College and The Life Experience School at The Peace Abbey in Sherborn, Massachusetts.

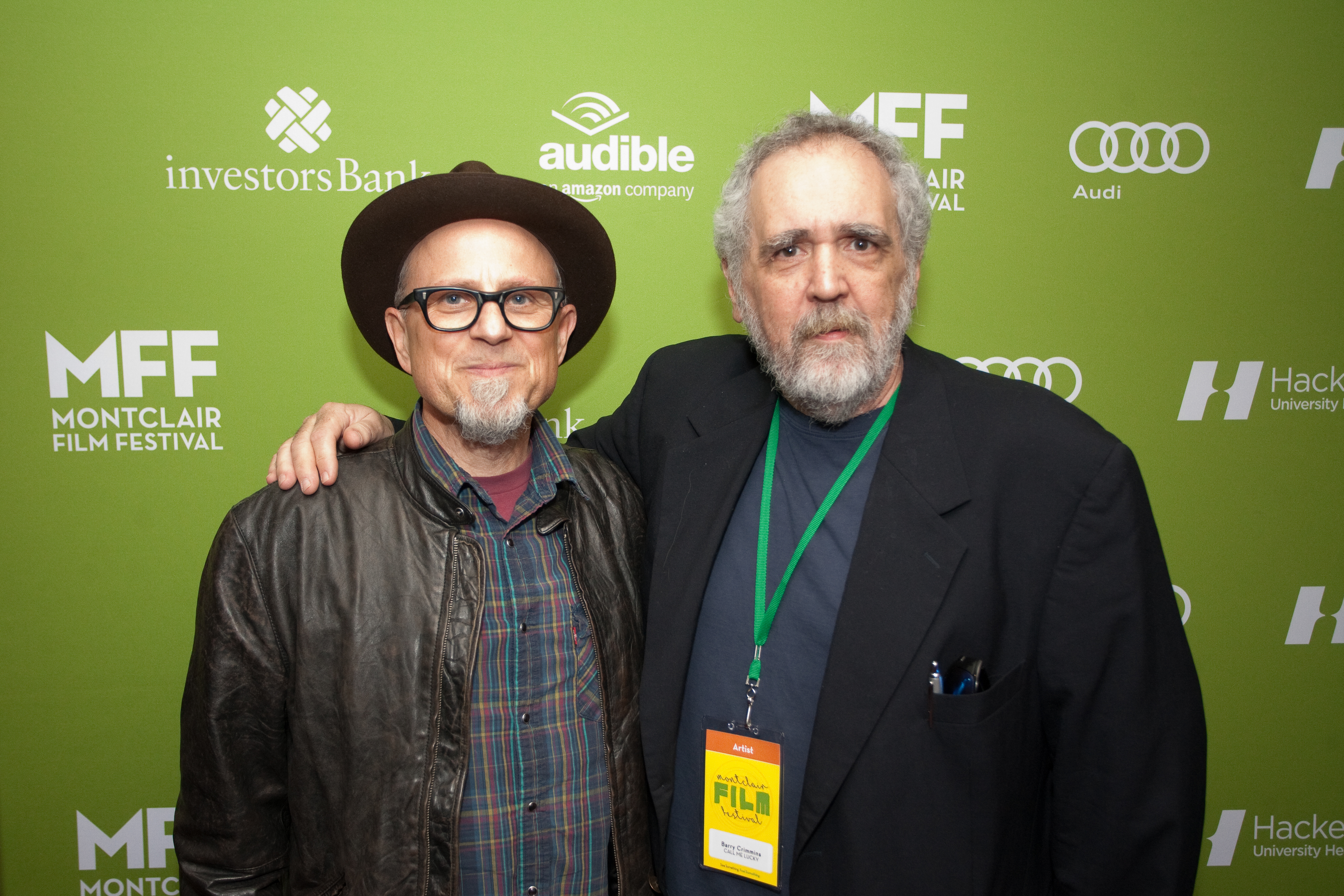
Crimmins with Bobcat Goldthwait in May 2015

Crimmins was featured on the podcast WTF with Marc Maron in 2013, discussing his personal life and career as a political activist and his role in the Boston comedy scene. In 2016, between performances in London, he appeared on Stuart Goldsmith's podcast The Comedian's Comedian.

=== Film and television ===
Crimmins was featured in a number of film and television appearances, including When Stand Up Stood Out (2003), The Smothers Brothers Comedy Hour (1988–1989), and The Young Comedians All-Star Reunion (1986). He released two albums: Strange Bedfellows on A&M Records and Kill the Messenger on Green Linnet. His articles were regularly published in the Boston Phoenix among other publications.

Crimmins's life and work in comedy and politics were the subjects of a documentary entitled Call Me Lucky (2015) directed by Bobcat Goldthwait.

On June 4, 2016, Crimmins shot a special, Whatever Threatens You, in Lawrence, Kansas for Louis C.K.'s production company Pig Newton.

== Activism ==
Crimmins survived sexual abuse as a child, and later became an anti-pedophilia activist. He began to expose online pedophilia in the 1990s, when he lived in Lakewood, Ohio. He spent hours in AOL chat rooms devoted to exposing predators, posing as a 12-year-old boy named "Sean."

In 1995, after turning his evidence over to the FBI, he testified before the United States Congress in 1995 about pedophilia on the internet, and how laws on child abuse images needed to be enforced. AOL eventually shut down the chat rooms dedicated to pedophilia and child abuse images.

In 2016, Crimmins endorsed Senator Bernie Sanders for President of the United States during the 2016 Democratic Party presidential primaries.

In 2017, in the wake of the #MeToo campaign, Crimmins voiced support of the movement and called for increased awareness of harassment in the workplace.

== Personal life ==
Crimmins married Helen Lysen, a photographer and font designer, in August 2017 in Chicago. They resided in Syracuse, New York. In January 2018, he was diagnosed with cancer and described the prognosis as "not very good". A few months earlier, Helen was diagnosed with stage four non-Hodgkin lymphoma.

Crimmins died of cancer on February 28, 2018, in Syracuse at the age of 64. His wife Helen reported his death from his Twitter account on March 1, saying, "Barry passed peacefully yesterday with Bobcat and I. He would want everyone to know that he cared deeply about mankind and wants you to carry on the good fight. Peace."

== Works ==
- Never Shake Hands with a War Criminal. New York: Seven Stories Press. 2004. ISBN 9781609800185.
