= Bobcat's Big Ass Show =

- Genre: Game show
- Created by: Eric Waddell
- Presented by: Bobcat Goldthwait
- Narrated by: Eric Waddell
- Country of origin: United States

Production
- Producers: Deboriah Dupree; Jamie Hammons; Anthony Ross; Kathy Sutula; Eric Waddell
- Running time: 30 Minutes
- Production company: Stone Stanley Productions

Original release
- Network: FX
- Release: 1998 – 1999

Bobcat's Big Ass Show is an American game show that aired on FX in 1998. Hosted by comedian Bobcat Goldthwait and announced by Eric Waddell, the series was based on a concept created by Waddell and packaged by Stone Stanley Productions. The show features contestants competing in stunts.

== First part ==
The first part of the show featured contestants playing three games mainly based on Truth or Dare? Two contestants participated in each game; the winner of that game (as determined by audience applause) would become one of three finalists in a final round; the three losers of each game, as well as the two losers of the final round (collectively referred to in-show as "big ass losers") would be subjected to humiliation backstage.

One example of a stunt involved toy animals, and it was up to the contestant to act out getting chomped by the animal on the face (the stunt's name as an example was "When Animals Attack").

== Second part ==
The second part involved the three winners of each game, with each contestant begging and pleading to the audience why he or she wanted to go on the grand prize vacation. Each contestant "begged" for six seconds, and after each contestant was finished pleading, the audience cheered depending on how each contestant did. The contestant with the most enthusiastic response from the audience went on to the bonus round.

== Bonus round ==
Called "Guess My Secret!", the bonus round featured the contestant wearing a helmet while the five losers of the show each told Bobcat three secrets, one of which was true, and it was up to Bobcat and the audience to guess. (Ultimately, Bobcat and the audience would arrive at the correct answers; a disclaimer at the end noted that Bobcat had been given the secrets before the show.) After that, the contestant removed the helmet. Bobcat read the three possible secrets for each loser; if the contestant answered incorrectly, they would have to wait until Bobcat re-read the remaining untried possibilities before trying again. The contestant had 60 seconds (as displayed on a computerized pink wine glass that tilted from side-to-side like a pendulum) to correctly guess all five secrets, and success won the trip; if the contestant failed, each of the losers received a small prize.
