= Chinese character tattoo =

Tattoos of Chinese characters in calligraphic style

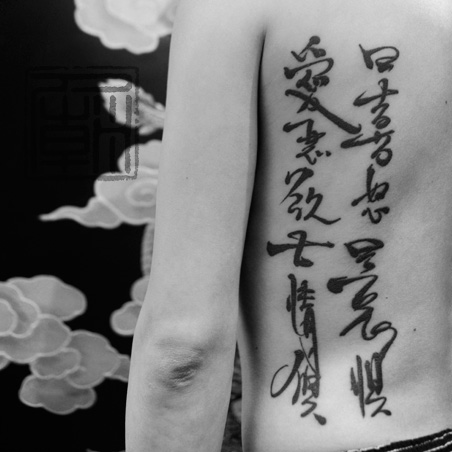
Cursive Chinese calligraphy

Chinese character tattoos, also called Hanzi tattoos, are tattoos of Chinese characters. They are sometimes in Chinese calligraphic script, a stylized, artistic form of writing.

== History ==
In pre-modern China, textual tattoos were used as a punishment for criminals. Criminals would get textual tattoos on their cheeks and foreheads of the crime that they committed and would therefore have their crime on display for the rest of their lives.

== Contemporary ==
Tattoos of Chinese characters and Japanese kanji are common in the modern Western world. They started becoming popular in the late 1980s or early 1990s among non-Asian Americans. Some celebrities have them, such as Britney Spears and David Beckham, along with professional basketball and football players. Often the characters used are ungrammatical, meaningless, or incorrectly drawn, as neither the tattoo artist nor the recipient understand the languages. Some tattoo artists use an incorrect reference sheet to try to translate English letters into Chinese characters.

Asian Americans, Asian New Zealanders and other people with Asian ancestry sometimes choose to get tattoos with Chinese, Japanese, or Korean characters that reflect their heritage. Joey Pang, a Chinese-born tattoo artist in Hong Kong, has specialized in Chinese calligraphy tattoos for Chinese customers.

== See also ==
- 2000s in fashion
