= Jason Stewart (film editor) =

American film editor

- Born: 1971
- Occupation: Film editor

Jason Stewart (born 1971) is an American film and television editor best known for his work on independent films and reality television. He has edited three films that have shown at the Sundance Film Festival: World's Greatest Dad, Sleeping Dogs Lie, and Douchebag.

Stewart, the younger brother of the writer Amy N. Stewart graduated from the Academy of Art University in San Francisco with a degree in film. He moved to Los Angeles and began a career editing reality television shows and two films by Bobcat Goldthwait.

== Films ==
- Cornhole: The Movie (2010) - editor
- World's Greatest Dad (2009) - editor. Film starring Robin Williams and directed by Bobcat Goldthwait.
- Ocean of Pearls (2008) - editor
- Sleeping Dogs Lie (2006) - editor. Directed by Bobcat Goldthwait.

== Television ==
- Minute to Win It - Supervising editor, three episodes.
- My Dad Is Better Than Your Dad - Editor, three episodes.
- Are You Smarter Than a 5th Grader - Editor, 28 episodes.
- The Voice - Editor, 21 episodes.
