= Alexie Gilmore =

American actress

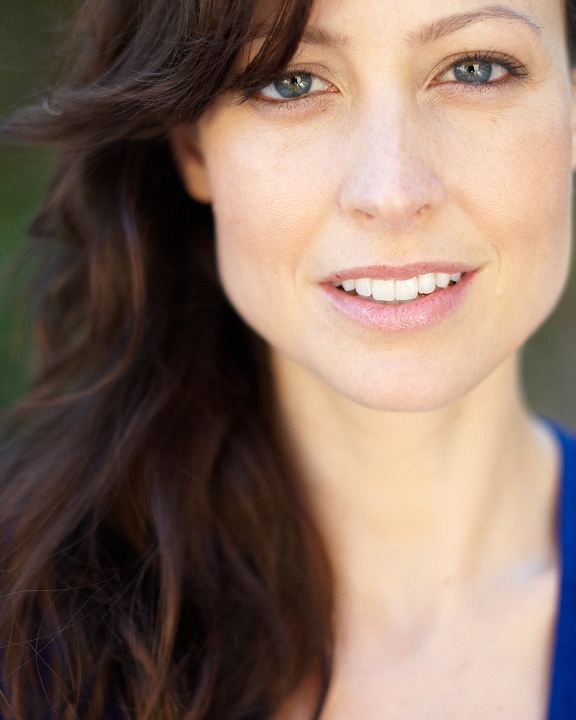
- Gilmore in 2009
- Born: Manhattan, New York City, U.S.
- Education: Tenafly High School; DeSales University
- Occupation: Actress
- Years active: 2000–present
- Known for: New Amsterdam

Alexie Gilmore is an American actress. She is known for her role as Dr. Sara Dillane on the Fox drama series New Amsterdam (2008). She has appeared in films such as The Babysitters (2007), Definitely, Maybe (2008), Surfer, Dude (2008), World's Greatest Dad (2009), Labor Day (2013), and There's Always Woodstock (2014). She also made several guest appearances as Devon Atwood, the ex-wife of Elijah Mundo on the CBS crime drama series CSI: Cyber (2015).

== Early life ==
Gilmore was born in Manhattan and moved to Tenafly, New Jersey, where she attended Tenafly High School. Gilmore attended Allentown College, which is now DeSales University, in Center Valley, Pennsylvania.

== Filmography ==
Year	Title	Role	Notes
2000	Lisa Picard Is Famous	Featured	Film debut
2005	Nicky's Game	Tatiana	Short film
2005	The Anger Eater	Liz	Short film
2006	Find Love	She	
2006	Cosa Bella	Belle	Short film
2006	The Devil Wears Prada	Clacker	Uncredited
2007	Descent	Seline	
2007	I Do & I Don't	Cheryl Murphy	
2007	The Babysitters	Jill	
2008	Definitely, Maybe	Olivia	
2008	Surfer, Dude	Danni Martin	
2008	The 27 Club	Anna	
2009	Frank the Rat	Sue	
2009	Mercy	Chris	
2009	World's Greatest Dad	Claire Reed	
2011	Brief Reunion	Lea	
2011	God Bless America	Morning Show Host	
2012	2nd Serve	Sherry	
2012	Fairhaven	Angela	
2012	Sexy Daddy	Rachel	Short film
2013	Carlos Spills the Beans	Rebecca	
2013	Labor Day	Marjorie	
2013	Willow Creek	Kelly	
2014	There's Always Woodstock	Sally	
2016	Woman Child	Malynn Winecott	Short film
2017	Espionage Tonight	Elizabeth Geary	
2018	The Art of Satisfaction	Naomi	Short film

=== Television ===
Year	Title	Role	Notes
2005	Rescue Me	Dawn	Episode: "Happy"
2006	Conviction	Kelly Kovacs	Episode: "Indebted"
2006	Love Monkey	Mary Dee Johnson	Episode: "The One That Got Away"
2006	Hope & Faith	Amber	Episode: "Jay Date"
2007	Law & Order: Criminal Intent	Regan Hanson	Episode: "Privilege"
2008	Wainy Days	Tamara	Episode: "Sublet"
2008	New Amsterdam	Dr. Sara Dillane	Main role
2009	Cupid	Sarah 'Sweet Jane' Porter	Episode: "Left of the Dial"
2009	Nurse Jackie	Amy Greenfield	Episode: "Pupil"
2009	Grey's Anatomy	Sarah Freemont	Episode: "Invasion" (part one of crossover)
2009	Private Practice	Sarah Freemont	Episode: "Right Here, Right Now" (part two of crossover)
2010	Medium	Gretchen Morgan	Episode: "An Everlasting Love"
2010	Ghost Whisperer	Julie Kale	Episode: "Implosion"
2010	Burn Notice	Claire Baruchel	Episode: "Dead or Alive"
2011	Svetlana	Monica	Episode: "Water-Board Certified"
2011	House	Ainsley Barton	Episode: "Risky Business"
2012	Hawaii Five-0	Vanessa Palmer	Episode: "Pa Make Loa"
2012	CSI: Crime Scene Investigation	Linda Burns	Episode: "Pick and Roll"
2013	90210	Elizabeth McManus	Episode: "#realness"
2014	Castle	Anita Miller	Episode: "Room 147"
2014	Believe	Sarah	Episode: "Bang and Blame"
2014	Legends	Serena Milloy	Episodes: "Quicksand", "Iconoclast", "Wilderness of Mirrors"
2014	Person of Interest	Rachel Farrow	Episode: "The Cold War"
2015	Maron	Linda	Episode: "Steel Johnson"
2015	The Grinder	Vanessa Gerhart	Episode: "Little Mitchard No More"
2015	CSI: Cyber	Devon Atwood	Episodes: "Fire Code", "Ghost in the Machine", "Shades of Grey"
2016	Lopez	Sheila	Episodes: "George Takes a Hike", "Down ad Drought in Beverly Hills", "George's Party"
2017	Bones	Cornelia Mills	Episode: "The Tutor in the Tussle"
2017	Get Shorty	Charlene	Episodes: "A Man of Letters", "Epinephrine"
2017	Lethal Weapon	Marla Weir	Episode: "Fools Rush In"
2017	The Magicians	Cindy Gaines	Episode: "The Rattening"
2019	Bull	Lena Crawford	Episode: "Safe and Sound"
2019–2020	Tacoma FD	Hunter's Mom	Episodes: "On the Hot Seat", "A Christmas Story"
2022	Magnum P.I.	Nora Simmons	Episode: "Evil Walks Softly"
