= New Era Park, Sacramento, California =

Neighborhood in Sacramento, California, United States

Coordinates: 38.5832°N 121.4765°W

New Era Park is a neighborhood in Sacramento, California. Its southern border is the middle of E Street, the American River is its northern border while 29th Street and 16th Street serve as eastern and western borders of the district. The majority of the area of Sutter's Landing Park sits inside the New Era neighborhood. As of 2007, the park contains some pedestrian trails and a skateboard park inside the old recycling plant, but is for the most part unimproved. Eventually the city plans on siting a number of sports fields and multiuse spaces within the park, and will connect it to the American River bicycle and running path to the west once rights-of-way with Blue Diamond and other industrial neighbors can be worked out.

== B Street Theater ==
The B Street Theater is one of the key features of the New Era Park district. Timothy Busfield, an actor from The West Wing and Studio 60 on the Sunset Strip helped start the theater with the help of his older brother Buck in 1991.

== New Era Community Garden ==
New Era Community Garden is located on a plot, in a cul de sac on 26th and C streets. The neighborhood has gone through many obstacles to get the garden started and it has flourished immensely. You can see the garden anytime and there may still be plots available if you are interested in contributing to the garden.
