= Cartoon Network 'Toon Jam! =

- Developer: Turner Interactive
- Platform: Windows
- Release: 1995

Cartoon Network 'Toon Jam!, also known as Toon Jam, is a 1995 video game developed by Turner Interactive.

== Gameplay ==
The player acts as the director of a cartoon music video, choosing sets, music, props, and characters from Cartoon Network properties such as the Jetsons, Magilla Gorilla, and Tom and Jerry. Guided by Moxie, the player assembles the production through the game's menu-driven interface and then watches the selected characters perform animated dances using the chosen elements, with the available customization centered on combining different actors, settings, music, and props into a finished music-video sequence.

== Reception ==
Computer Game Review recommended Toon Jam for the entire family. The Birmingham News found Toon Jam to have no educational value or music appreciation potential. CNET called Toon Jam frustrating and ultimately pointless.
