= Durst (surname) =

Durst is a surname of German origin (meaning thirst), and may refer to:

- Cedric Durst (1896–1971), American outfielder in Major League Baseball
- Douglas Durst (born 1944), American businessman, New York real estate investor, and developer
- Fred Durst (born 1970), American singer from American metal band Limp Bizkit
- Hans-Peter Durst (born 1958), German para cyclist
- Joseph Durst (1882–1974), American real estate developer
- Kathryn Durst, Canadian artist
- Matthias Durst (1815–1875), Austrian violinist and composer
- Mose Durst (born 1939), American author, educator, and former national president of the Unification Church
- Nora Durst, a character in The Leftovers TV series
- Richard Durst (born 1945), American educator, president of Baldwin-Wallace College in Berea, Ohio
- Robert Durst (1943–2022), American businessman, millionaire, and convicted murderer
- Seymour Durst (1913–1995), American inventor of the National Debt Clock
- Stephanie Durst (born 1982), American sprinter
- Will Durst (born 1952), American political satirist

== See also ==
- Dorst (surname)
