= H. Dorst =

Indonesian footballer

Personal information
- Place of birth: Dutch East Indies
- Position: Defender

Senior career*
Years	Team	Apps	(Gls)
193?—1939	Sidolig Bandung		
1939—194?	VIOS Batavia		

International career
- Dutch East Indies
- * Club domestic league appearances and goals

H. Dorst was an Indonesian football defender who played for the Dutch East Indies in the 1938 FIFA World Cup. He also played for Sidolig Bandung and VIOS Batavia. Dorst is deceased.
