= Melinda Page Hamilton =

American actress

- Born: New York City, U.S.
- Education: Princeton University (BA); New York University (MFA)
- Occupation: Actress
- Years active: 1997–present
- Children: 1

Melinda Page Hamilton is an American actress, best known for her role as Odessa Burakov in the Lifetime comedy-drama series Devious Maids, and for her leading role in the independent film Sleeping Dogs Lie (2006). She has had recurring roles on Desperate Housewives, Mad Men, and Big Love.

== Life and career ==
Hamilton was born in New York City. She attended Princeton University and later the Tisch School of the Arts in New York University. She starred in a number of theatre productions, including as the title character in the original stage production of Cornelia, written by Mark V. Olsen. She made her television debut in the episode of NBC legal drama Law & Order in 1997, and as of 2003, began playing regular guest-starring roles in shows including Star Trek: Enterprise, Nip/Tuck, Ghost Whisperer, Criminal Minds, The Closer, Castle, NCIS, Modern Family, and True Blood. Her memorable 2003 Star Trek: Enterprise role of Feezal, the alien scientist and second wife of Doctor Phlox, explored the concept of polyamory.

She had a supporting role in the 2004 film Promised Land, and the lead role in the 2006 film Sleeping Dogs Lie. She also appeared in the films Corporate Affairs (2008), Not Forgotten (2009), and God Bless America (2011).

On television, she had recurring roles in the ABC comedy-drama series Desperate Housewives as Sister Mary Bernard, a nun pursuing a married man, and on the AMC period drama Mad Men, as Anna Draper, polio survivor and widow of the man whose identity Don Draper stole in Korea. She also guest-starred on Grey's Anatomy and its spin-off Private Practice, and on several of the shows in the CSI franchise: CSI: Crime Scene Investigation CSI: NY, and CSI: Miami. She also appeared in HBO drama series Big Love from 2009 to 2010.

In 2013, Hamilton appeared as Odessa Burakov in the first two seasons of the Lifetime comedy-drama series Devious Maids, for which she adopted a Russian accent. In 2015, she had recurring roles in the USA Network series Dig, and the SundanceTV drama, Rectify.

She had the recurring role of Special Agent Telesco in the ABC Drama series How to Get Away with Murder. She also appeared in the Amazon Prime Video series The Peripheral.

== Filmography ==
=== Film ===
Year	Title	Role	Notes
2004	Promised Land	Marisa	
2006	Sleeping Dogs Lie	Amy	Nominated - Gotham Independent Film Award for Breakthrough Actor
2007	Driftwood	Blaire Farrow	Short film
2008	Corporate Affairs	Chris	
2009	Not Forgotten	Deputy Mindy	
2009	The Horseman	Abigail Cooper	Short film
2011	God Bless America	Alison	
2020	M.O.M. (MOTHERS OF MONSTERS)	Abbey Bell	

=== Television ===
Year	Title	Role	Notes
1997	Law & Order	Jane Spoonser	Episode: "Denial"
2003	Star Trek: Enterprise	Feezal	Episode: "Stigma"
2004	CSI: Miami	Julie Bryant	Episode: "Slow Burn"
2004	Everwood	Mary Kelly	Episode: "There Is a Reaction"
2004	Medical Investigation	Sarah Doyle	Episode: "Alienation"
2005	Numb3rs	Jennifer Nash	Episode: "Soft Target"
2005	Nip/Tuck	Colleen Eubanks	Episode: "Hannah Tedesco"
2005	CSI: NY	Kayla Stanfield / Tara Stanfield	Episode: "Bad Beat"
2005–2006	Desperate Housewives	Sister Mary Bernard	Three episodes
2005–2007	Cold Case	Janie Stillman	Episodes: "Revenge" and "Blood on the Tracks"
2007	Raines	Connie Webb	Episode: "5th Step"
2007	Ghost Whisperer	Jane Taylor	Episode: "Holiday Spirit"
2008	Criminal Minds	Claire Bates	Episode: "The Instincts"
2008	Without a Trace	Dr. Sally Moss	Episode: "Push Comes to Shove"
2008–2010	Mad Men	Anna Draper	Recurring role
2009	The Closer	Beth Gibson	Episode: "Good Faith"
2009	The Mentalist	Katie	Episode: "Crimson Casanova"
2009	Castle	Diana Harris	Episode: "Nanny McDead"
2009	Private Practice	Donna Keating	Episode: "What You Do for Love"
2009	Bones	Georgia Hartmeyer	Episode: "The Goop on the Girl"
2009–2010	Big Love	Malinda	Recurring role
2010	NCIS	Vanessa Tillman	Episode: "Ignition"
2010	The Glades	Sara Weston	Episode: "Cassadaga"
2010	Grey's Anatomy	Dr. Jennifer Stanley	Episode: "That's Me Trying"
2011	CSI: Crime Scene Investigation	Jody Cambry	Episode: "The List"
2011	Law & Order: LA	Attorney	Episode: "Angel's Knoll"
2012	Modern Family	Sandy	Episode: "Election Day"
2012	True Blood	Jill Steeler	Episode: "Whatever I Am, You Made Me"
2012	Vegas	Ginny	Episode: "Estinto"
2013–2014	Devious Maids	Odessa Burakov	Recurring role
2014	Hart of Dixie	Marian	Episode: "Star of the Show"
2014	NCIS: New Orleans	Alexandra Schwartz	Episode: "Watch Over Me"
2014	Killer Women	DEA Agent	Episode: "Queen Bee"
2014	Masters of Sex	Anne Palmateer	Episode: "Kyrie Eleison"
2015	Dig	Sandra	Recurring role
2015	Jane the Virgin	Alexis Falco	Episode: "Chapter Eighteen"
2015	iZombie	Dr. Maddy Larson	Episode: "Astroburger"
2015	The Whispers	Ms. Bellings	Episode: "X Marks the Spot"
2015	True Detective	Gena's Attorney	Episode: "Other Lives"
2015	Rectify	Therapist	Episode: "Thrill Ride"
2016	Grimm	Joan Vark	Episode: "The Believer"
2017–2018	Damnation	Connie Nunn	Main cast
2017–2019	How to Get Away with Murder	Claire Telesco	Recurring role
2020	Mrs. America	Mary Frances	Recurring role, miniseries
2020	Messiah	Anna Iguero	Recurring role
2020	Dirty John	Kerry Wells	Episode: "Perception Is Reality"
2022–present	The Peripheral	Ella	Main cast
2024	High Potential		Episode: "Dirty Rotten Scoundrel"
