= Don Gavin =

American stand-up comedian and actor

- Born: West Roxbury, Massachusetts, United States

Comedy career
- Medium: Stand-up, television, film
- Genres: Observational comedy, satire, black comedy, sarcasm
- Subjects: American culture, everyday life, human behavior, pop culture

Don Gavin is an American stand-up comedian and actor best known for such films and television series as Shallow Hal and Dr. Katz, Professional Therapist.

In 1989, Gavin made an appearance on an episode of the Australian variety TV show Hey Hey It's Saturday.

In 2020, he appeared on episode 1,418 of The Joe Rogan Experience.
