= Jimmy Tingle =

American comic and actor

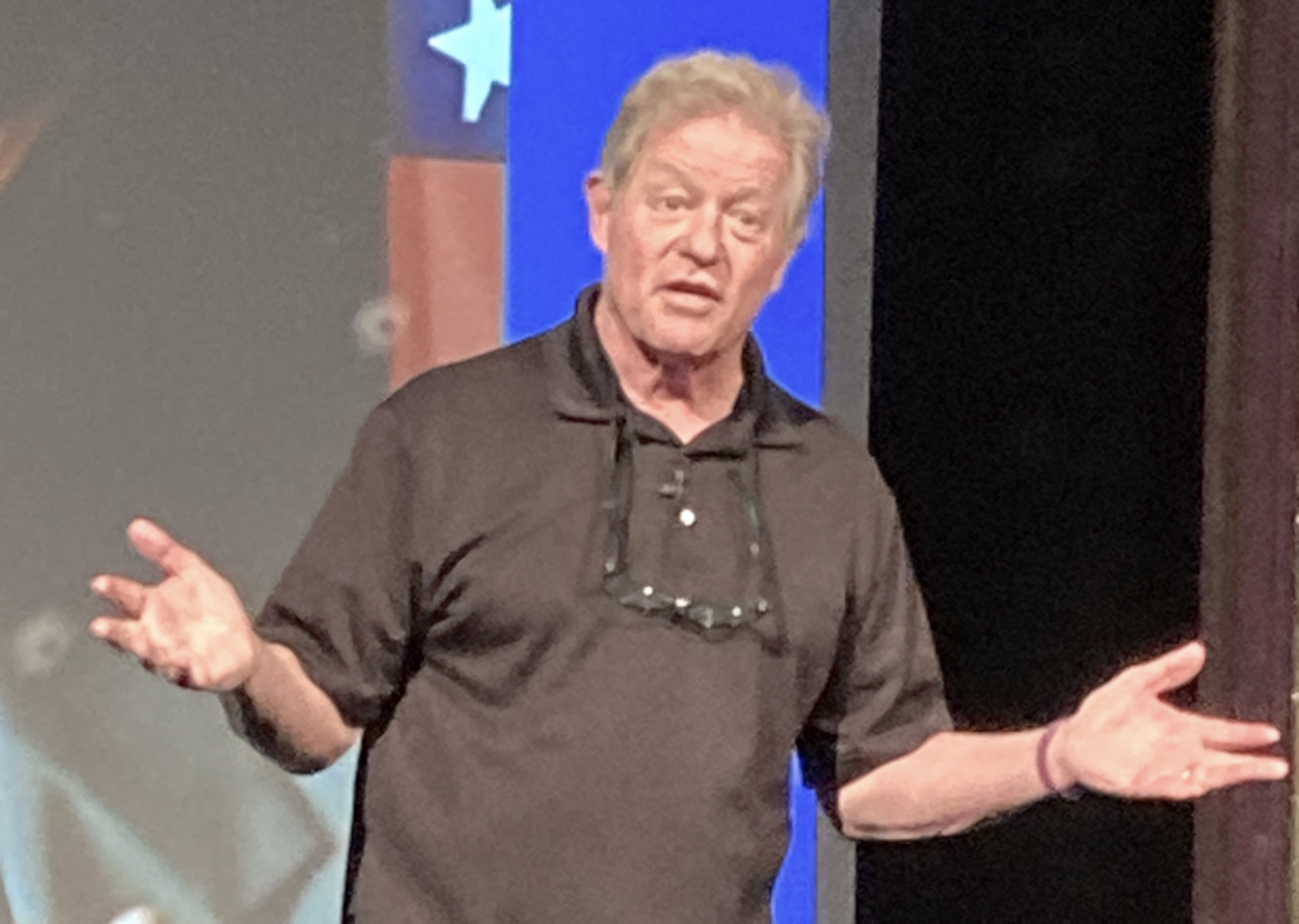
- Tingle in 2024

Personal details
- Born: April 9, 1955 (age 71) Cambridge, Massachusetts, U.S.
- Party: Democratic
- Education: University of Massachusetts, Dartmouth (BA); Harvard University (MPA)

Jimmy Tingle (born April 9, 1955) is an American comic and occasional actor.

== Life and career ==
Tingle was the American correspondent for David Frost’s show for PBS and the BBC, The Strategic Humor Initiative. He completed two seasons with 60 Minutes II on CBS as the humorist/commentator in the Andy Rooney spot. He worked as a contributor and satirist for MSNBC and has appeared on Tough Crowd with Colin Quinn, The Tonight Show, Larry King's Weekend, and Late Night with Conan O'Brien, The Late Late Show with Tom Snyder, The American Comedy Awards, as well as his own HBO comedy special.

Tingle appeared as a television talk show host in Chris Rock’s film, Head of State. Other film credits include the role of the neighborhood bartender in Next Stop Wonderland, a priest in Boondock Saints, and a restaurant owner in By the Sea. Tingle also starred in the International Emmy Award-winning documentary on art censorship, Damned in the U.S.A. produced by Channel 4 in the United Kingdom for its Without Walls arts series, in partnership with Channel Thirteen in New York. He co-starred in the PBS Travels series special "America with the Top Down" and appeared in But Seriously and But Seriously '94, Showtime documentaries featuring prominent social satirists from Lenny Bruce to the present. As political satirist, practitioner of non-violence and activist, Tingle received the Peace Abbey Courage of Conscience Award for his efforts to support peace and social change and through whom, humor and satire help in combating destructive elements in society.

Tingle has the rare distinction of winning the prestigious “Best of Boston” award as both a performer in 2001 in the “stand up comedy” category and as a producer in 2007 for Jimmy Tingle’s OFF BROADWAY Theater. His theatrical credits include writing and starring in four different one person shows, all of which were directed by Larry Arrick. Jimmy Tingle's Uncommon Sense, The Education of an American Comic received stellar reviews during a nine-week engagement at the American Place Theater in New York City and continued to succeed brilliantly at the Hasty Pudding Theater in Cambridge, MA becoming the longest running one person show in that theater's history. The show made its Los Angeles debut at the Coast Playhouse in 1998 and was nominated by The L.A. Weekly for "best male solo performance" for their 20th Annual Theater Awards. Uncommon Sense was followed by Jimmy Tingle in the Promised Land (2002) and Jimmy Tingle’s American Dream (2005), which is currently in production to be released as a film.

He has hosted events such as Newton Has Talent.

=== Jimmy Tingle's Off-Broadway Theater ===
From 2002 to 2007 he served as owner, principal performer and producing director of Jimmy Tingle's OFF BROADWAY Theater in Somerville, Massachusetts, which presented over 200 productions and/or co productions from the worlds of comedy, music, theater, television, radio, political events and kids shows during its five years of existence. In August 2007 JTOB was voted “Best of Boston" in "Theater Alternative" category by Boston Magazine.

=== Education ===
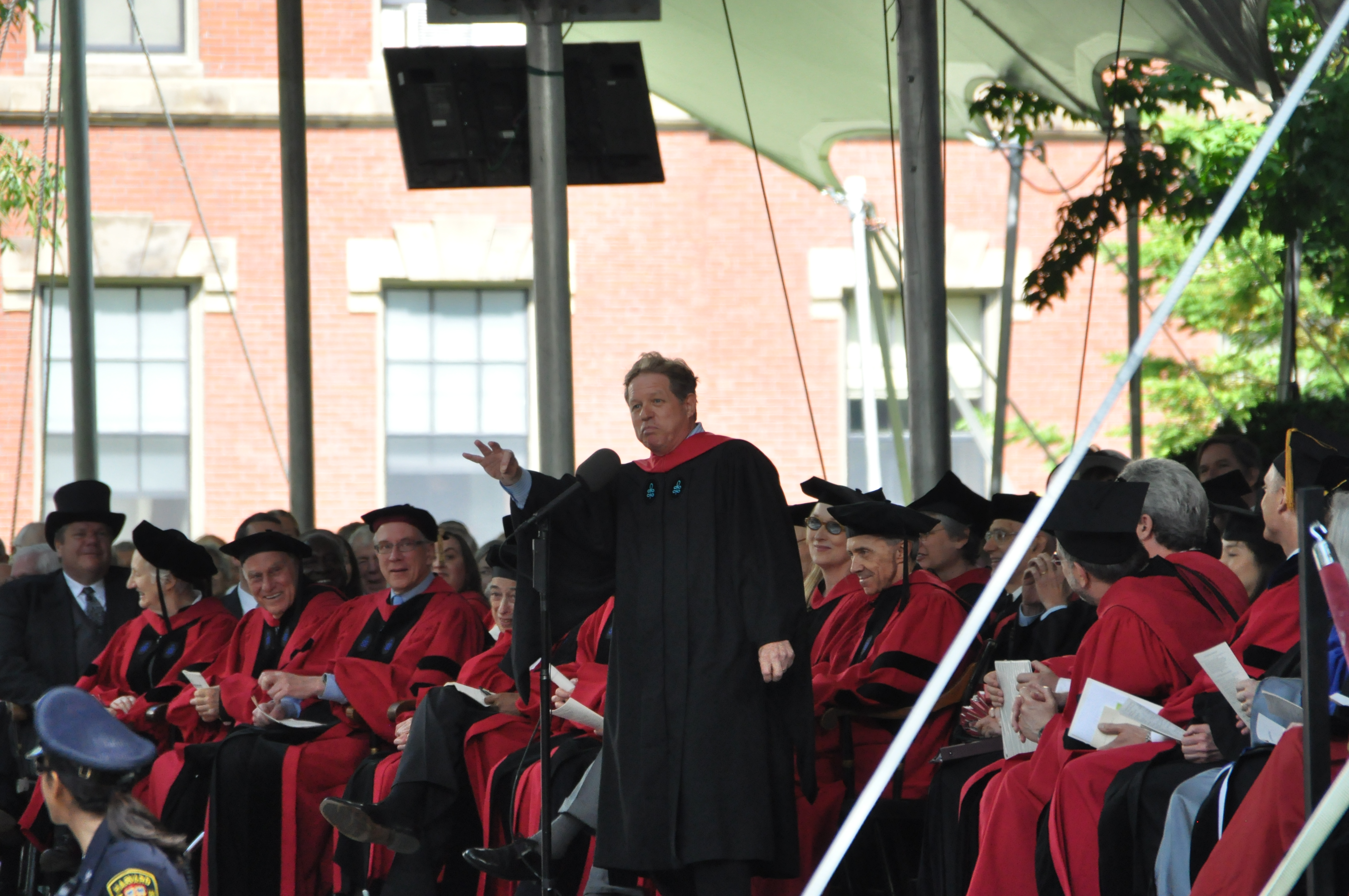
Jimmy Tingle giving the English address at Harvard University Graduate School's 2010 commencement

A 1977 graduate of Southeastern Massachusetts University (now UMass Dartmouth) with a degree in history, Tingle returned to school, earning a master's degree from the Harvard Kennedy School in 2010; he was selected to give an address at Harvard's commencement ceremony that year.

=== Politics ===
Tingle is a member of the Democratic Party. In October 2017, he announced that he would run for the office of Lieutenant Governor of Massachusetts. In the Democratic primary election held on September 4, 2018, Tingle was defeated by attorney Quentin Palfrey.

== Filmography ==
- "CBC Winnipeg Comedy Festival" .... Himself (1 episode, 2008)
- "Mock the Week" .... Himself (1 episode, 2007)
- Boomtown (2005)
- The Strategic Humor Initiative (2003) (TV) .... Himself
- Head of State (2003) (as James Tingle) .... Talk-show host
- By the Sea (2002) .... Julian
- 60 Minutes II (1999) TV series .... Himself - Correspondent (unknown episodes, 1999–2000)

... aka 60 Minutes (USA: new title)
... aka 60 Minutes Wednesday (USA: new title)

- The Boondock Saints (1999) .... The Priest
- Next Stop Wonderland (1998) .... Lowrey the Bartender
- Travels "America with the Top Down" (1992)... Himself
- "One Night Stand" .... Himself (1 episode, 1991)

Episode dated April 6, 1991 (1991) TV episode .... Himself

- Damned in the U.S.A. (1991) .... Himself

... aka Damned in the USA (USA: video box title)

- The 4th Annual American Comedy Awards (1990) (TV) .... Himself
