= House season 5 =

House
- Season 5
- Season 5 DVD cover
- Starring: Hugh Laurie; Lisa Edelstein; Omar Epps; Robert Sean Leonard; Jennifer Morrison; Jesse Spencer; Peter Jacobson; Kal Penn; Olivia Wilde
- No. of episodes: 24

Release
- Original network: Fox
- Original release: September 16, 2008 – May 11, 2009

Season chronology
- ← Previous; Season 4 Next → Season 6

The fifth season of House, also known as House, M.D., premiered September 16, 2008 and ended May 11, 2009. It began to air in a new time slot from September to December: Tuesday 8:00 pm. Starting January 19, 2009, House moved to Mondays at 8:00 pm.

== Cast and characters ==
=== Main cast ===
- Hugh Laurie as Dr. Gregory House
- Lisa Edelstein as Dr. Lisa Cuddy
- Omar Epps as Dr. Eric Foreman
- Robert Sean Leonard as Dr. James Wilson (episodes 1–2 and 4–24)
- Jennifer Morrison as Dr. Allison Cameron (episodes 1, 4–13, 15 and 19–24)
- Jesse Spencer as Dr. Robert Chase (episodes 1–13, 15 and 17–24)
- Peter Jacobson as Dr. Chris Taub
- Kal Penn as Dr. Lawrence Kutner (episodes 1–20 and 24)
- Olivia Wilde as Dr. Remy 'Thirteen' Hadley

=== Recurring cast ===
- Anne Dudek as Dr. Amber Volakis
- Jennifer Crystal Foley as Rachel Taub
- Michael Weston as Lucas Douglas
- Lori Petty as Janice Burke
- Diane Baker as Blythe House
- R. Lee Ermey as John House
- Tracy Vilar as Nurse Regina

=== Guest cast ===
Becky Baeling, Ed Brigadier, Darcy Rose Byrnes, Colleen Camp, Julia Campbell, Michael Leydon Campbell, B. K. Cannon, Clare Carey, Marcus Chait, Faune A. Chambers, Jake Cherry, Tim Colon, Jack Conley, Felicia Day, Mos Def, Mary Jo Deschanel, Marika Dominczyk, Taylor Dooley, Treshelle Edmond, Susan Egan, Sherilyn Fenn, Erika Flores, John Forest, Nathan Gamble, Angela Gots, Judy Greer, Brad Grunberg, Wood Harris, Christine Healy, Martin Henderson, Ashton Holmes, Željko Ivanek, Evan Jones, Elaine Kagan, Eric Kaldor, John Kapelos, Jay Karnes, Dominic Scott Kay, Diarra Kilpatrick, Sarah Knowlton, Alix Korey, Joanna Koulis, Ryan Lane, Meat Loaf, Todd Louiso, Alexandra Lydon, Phyllis Lyons, Meaghan Martin, Lindsey McKeon, Breckin Meyer, Devon Michaels, Christopher Moynihan, Becky O'Donohue, Scott Paulin, Evan Peters, Drew Powell, Nick Puga, David Purdham, Samantha Quan, Ben Reed, Carl Reiner, Emily Rios, Tim Rock, Jamie Rose, Alex Schemmer, Judith Scott, Samantha Shelton, Kyle Red Silverstein, Jimmi Simpson, Alex Sol, Maria Thayer, Jake Thomas, Sarah Thompson, Lucas Till, Jamie Tisdale, Bitsie Tulloch, Natasha Gregson Wagner, Christine Woods, Salvator Xuereb, Liza Colón-Zayas and Vanessa Zima.

== Reception ==
Reception for season 5 met with generally positive reviews, and holds a Metacritic score of 77 out of 100, based on ten reviews, indicating "generally favorable" reviews. It also holds a 100% approval rating on aggregate review website Rotten Tomatoes, with an average score of 8.1 based on nine collected reviews.

== Episodes ==
No. overall	No. in season	Title	Directed by	Written by	Original release date	US viewers (millions)
87	1	"Dying Changes Everything"	Deran Sarafian	Eli Attie	September 16, 2008	14.77
Two months have passed since Amber Volakis's shocking death. Unable to cope, Wilson resigns from the hospital, while Cuddy desperately tries to get him and House to repair their shattered friendship. Meanwhile, Thirteen struggles with her own diagnosis of Huntington's and helps to treat an executive assistant (Christine Woods) with a similar personality to her own. Final diagnosis: Diffuse leprosy of Lucio and Latapí
88	2	"Not Cancer"	David Straiton	David Shore & Lawrence Kaplow	September 23, 2008	12.38
An organ donor's organs are responsible for the deaths of several patients, and the team works against the clock to save the last two recipients. Meanwhile, House hires private detective Lucas (Michael Weston) to spy on Wilson, as well as his team, during the differentials. Final diagnosis: Transplanted cancer stem cells Absent: Jennifer Morrison as Allison Cameron
89	3	"Adverse Events"	Andrew Bernstein	Carol Green & Dustin Paddock	September 30, 2008	12.98
A painter's (Breckin Meyer) undiagnosed illness begins to affect his work, but he is unable to see his art is suddenly grotesque. He is brought to Princeton-Plainsboro Hospital, though he claims that he is getting better. House grows suspicious when he learns that the painter was fearful of a test involving the injection of a dye. It is later revealed that he is on three separate drug trials, which he was hiding from his girlfriend. Meanwhile, House continues to use Lucas to obtain information about his team and to learn more about Cuddy's personal life. Final diagnosis: Food Bolus Bezoar complicated by massive experimental pharmaceutical drug intake Absent: James Wilson (Robert Sean Leonard) and Allison Cameron (Jennifer Morrison) were mentioned, but did not appear
90	4	"Birthmarks"	David Platt	Doris Egan & David Foster	October 14, 2008	13.27
House is coerced into going to his father's funeral despite his protests. His team takes on the case of a young woman (Samantha Quan) who collapsed while in China searching for her birth parents. House works with the team via cell phone, while Wilson drives him—reluctantly—to the funeral. House's phone is taken by a cop mid-diagnosis and the team must decipher House's last statement. Meanwhile, the story of how House and Wilson met for the first time is revealed. Final diagnosis: Metal pins in brain (from attempted infanticide) displaced by a magnet.
91	5	"Lucky Thirteen"	Greg Yaitanes	Liz Friedman & Sara Hess	October 21, 2008	13.09
Thirteen takes a woman (Angela Gots) with whom she had a one-night stand to Princeton-Plainsboro after the woman has a seizure in Thirteen's apartment. House and the team take on her case, House using it as an opportunity to explore Thirteen's personal life. Thirteen ends up finding out the patient only slept with her to get to House, who had been rejecting the woman as a patient for many years. Meanwhile, Lucas continues on Wilson's trail. Final diagnosis: Candidiasis secondary to Sjögren syndrome
92	6	"Joy"	Deran Sarafian	David Hoselton	October 28, 2008	13.50
The team take on the case of a middle-aged man (Salvator Xuereb) who has been experiencing recurring blackouts, time lapses and sleepwalking. They soon find out that the man's 12-year-old daughter (Joanna Koulis) has also been experiencing sleepwalking spells. The man's condition deteriorates and his daughter also begins to experience more symptoms. Meanwhile, House finds out Cuddy is going to adopt a baby that is due in two weeks. However, the birth mother (Vanessa Zima) has a strange rash on her arm, so Cuddy takes on her case as both a doctor and a potential mother. Final diagnosis: Familial Mediterranean fever (Jerry and Samantha) and pulmonary hypoplasia (Joy)
93	7	"The Itch"	Greg Yaitanes	Peter Blake	November 11, 2008	13.06
An agoraphobic man (Todd Louiso) falls ill and refuses to leave his home to be treated at the hospital. Therefore, House and the team go to his home to figure out what might be wrong. Cameron takes charge of the case as she had treated the patient in the past and she and the team figure out ways to treat him at his home. However, the patient's condition worsens and it becomes difficult to treat him at his home. House and the team plan to get the man into the hospital for surgery without causing any problems. Meanwhile, Cameron and Chase attempt to work through issues in their relationship, and House deals with an annoying itch he cannot seem to scratch, with Wilson making his own analogies about the problem. Final diagnosis: Lead poisoning from shards of a bullet
94	8	"Emancipation"	Jim Hayman	Pamela Davis & Leonard Dick	November 18, 2008	13.26
The team takes on the case of a 16-year-old factory manager (Emily Rios) who collapsed when her lungs suddenly filled with fluid while at work. The teenager informs House and team that she has been an emancipated minor ever since her parents died. Meanwhile, Foreman asks for House's permission to work on a clinical trial and House rejects his proposal. In an effort to prove himself capable of working without House's supervision, Foreman takes on his own pediatric case, but when the unexplained illness brings the child (Kyle Red Silverstein) to the brink of death, Foreman is left questioning his ability to work free from House's custody. Final diagnosis: Acute promyelocytic leukemia and arsenic poisoning (Sophia) and Iron poisoning (Jonah)
95	9	"Last Resort"	Katie Jacobs	Story by : Matthew V. Lewis; Teleplay by : Matthew V. Lewis & Eli Attie	November 25, 2008	12.88
A man (Željko Ivanek) takes over Cuddy's office and holds House, Thirteen, and several patients hostage, demanding a diagnosis. To make sure that the doctors are not going to sedate him, he forces Thirteen to act as a guinea pig for his treatments. House has to find a way to end the standoff before Thirteen becomes seriously ill, and before SWAT start their assault. Final diagnosis: Melioidosis
96	10	"Let Them Eat Cake"	Deran Sarafian	Russel Friend & Garrett Lerner	December 2, 2008	12.52
A fitness guru (Samantha Shelton) known for her "natural" lifestyle collapses while shooting an infomercial. Meanwhile, Thirteen participates in a clinical drug trial for Huntington's disease led by Foreman; Kutner operates an online medical-advice clinic under House's name; and Cuddy moves into House's office while hers is being repaired, much to House's dismay. Final diagnosis: Hereditary coproporphyria (Emmy) and Malingering (Deedee, paid by House)
97	11	"Joy to the World"	David Straiton	Peter Blake	December 9, 2008	14.05
A troubled teen (B. K. Cannon) collapses during her high-school Christmas program; Foreman and Thirteen learn more about each other as they work together on the Huntington's disease drug trial; House gives and receives holiday gifts, leading to team speculation; and Cuddy receives a gift as well. Final diagnosis: Post-partum eclampsia
98	12	"Painless"	Andrew Bernstein	Thomas L. Moran & Eli Attie	January 19, 2009	15.03
At Cameron's urging, the team takes the case of a suicidal man (Martin Henderson) who suffers from excruciating chronic pain—pain that mirrors House's. Meanwhile, Cuddy discovers that caring for her new foster baby leaves her little time to run the hospital; and Foreman and Thirteen continue to explore their complicated relationship as they work together on their Huntington's disease drug trial. Final diagnosis: Abdominal epilepsy
99	13	"Big Baby"	Deran Sarafian	Lawrence Kaplow & David Foster	January 26, 2009	15.69
Cuddy decides to spend more time at home to take care of her new foster baby and gives Cameron the responsibility of overseeing House. The team treats a special education teacher (Erika Flores) whose seemingly inherent goodness is actually a pathology. Foreman must make a potentially dangerous decision about Thirteen's participation in his drug trial. Final diagnosis: Patent ductus arteriosus
100	14	"The Greater Good"	Lesli Linka Glatter	Sara Hess	February 2, 2009	14.87
House and the team take on the case of a woman (Judith Scott) who collapsed in the middle of a cooking class. When they learn that the patient gave up her career as a highly renowned cancer researcher in order to pursue her own personal happiness, the members of the team question their own happiness (or lack thereof). Meanwhile, Thirteen begins to suffer serious and life-threatening reactions to her experimental Huntington's disease clinical drug trial, and Cuddy retaliates against House and gives him a taste of his own medicine. Final diagnosis: Ectopic endometriosis Absent: Jesse Spencer as Robert Chase, Jennifer Morrison as Allison Cameron
101	15	"Unfaithful"	Greg Yaitanes	David Hoselton	February 16, 2009	14.20
When a priest (Jimmi Simpson) who runs a homeless shelter sees a bleeding Jesus hovering at his doorstep, he is admitted to the ER. House takes on the case as a distraction for the team while he confronts Foreman and Thirteen about their relationship. The team soon learns the priest had been involved in a molestation scandal that caused him to lose his faith. However, just as they are about to dismiss his case, the patient's condition takes a drastic turn for the worse, and House grapples with his past and his own personal beliefs. Final diagnosis: Alcoholism and Wiskott–Aldrich syndrome
102	16	"The Softer Side"	Deran Sarafian	Liz Friedman	February 23, 2009	14.86
The team encounters a teenage boy (Dominic Scott Kay) who collapsed from severe pelvic pain after playing basketball. The boy was born with a condition called genetic mosaicism (46, XX/XY), or both male and female DNA, and the boy's parents inform House and the team that the boy is unaware of his condition. They chose a gender for him when he was born and raised him accordingly. However, when his condition worsens and his life is threatened, the parents wonder whether they made the right decision. Meanwhile, Cuddy and Wilson suspect something is wrong with House when he starts acting way too nice. Final diagnosis: Kidney dysfunction secondary to dehydration and Nephrogenic Systemic Fibrosis Absent: Jesse Spencer as Robert Chase, Jennifer Morrison as Allison Cameron
103	17	"The Social Contract"	Andrew Bernstein	Doris Egan	March 9, 2009	12.38
House and the team take on the case of Nick Greenwald (Jay Karnes), a book editor who loses his inhibitions and starts insulting co-workers at a dinner party one night before falling ill. The team realizes Nick has frontal lobe disinhibition, which has caused him to lose his filter and vocalize all of his innermost thoughts, resulting in extremely insulting outbursts. As Nick's free speech leads to some amusing and insightful comments regarding the team, he must deal with the consequences of being unable to lie to his wife and everyone else important in his life. Meanwhile, House suspects Wilson and Taub are keeping something from him when he catches them both in a lie. Final diagnosis: Autoimmunity secondary to Doege-Potter syndrome Absent: Jennifer Morrison as Allison Cameron
104	18	"Here Kitty"	Juan J. Campanella	Peter Blake	March 16, 2009	13.13
Nursing-home worker Morgan (Judy Greer) fakes illness to get House's attention after the home's pet cat, Debbie, sleeps next to her. It seems that Debbie only pays a visit to people if they are about to die and does so with alarming accuracy. While House dismisses Morgan as a nut job, he is intrigued by her theory on the kiss-of-death cat, and sets out to disprove it. When Morgan falls seriously ill, he and the team are forced to get to the bottom of both mysteries. Meanwhile, Taub struggles with his finances and reconnects with an old high school friend at the clinic whose business successes present Taub with an entrepreneurial opportunity he had not previously considered. Final diagnosis: Appendiceal Carcinoid Absent: Jennifer Morrison as Allison Cameron
105	19	"Locked In"	Dan Attias	Russel Friend & Garrett Lerner & David Foster	March 30, 2009	12.51
House is injured in a motorcycle accident in New York and finds himself in bed next to a patient (Mos Def) suffering from complete paralysis from a bicycling accident. As House transfers the patient to Princeton to determine what's wrong with him, Wilson tries to find out why House was in New York in the first place. Final diagnosis: Locked-in syndrome secondary to Leptospirosis
106	20	"Simple Explanation"	Greg Yaitanes	Leonard Dick	April 6, 2009	13.29
An older woman, Charlotte (Colleen Camp), who has been taking care of her husband Eddie (Meat Loaf) for the last six months, is rushed to Princeton-Plainsboro for treatment after collapsing at Eddie's deathbed from respiratory failure. The case is further complicated as Eddie's condition improves while Charlotte's deteriorates. Meanwhile, the team tries to deal with their grief over Kutner's sudden suicide. Final diagnosis: Visceral leishmaniasis (Charlotte) and Blastomycosis (Eddie)
107	21	"Saviors"	Matthew Penn	Eli Attie & Thomas L. Moran	April 13, 2009	12.19
Staff at Princeton-Plainsboro, particularly House and the team, try to deal with Kutner's recent suicide while Cameron presents House with the case of an environmentalist (Tim Rock) who collapsed in the middle of a protest. Meanwhile, Cameron cancels a trip that Chase had planned for them and spends the next few days avoiding him for a surprising reason. Final diagnosis: Sporotrichosis
108	22	"House Divided"	Greg Yaitanes	Matthew V. Lewis & Liz Friedman	April 27, 2009	11.69
A deaf 14-year-old boy, Seth (Ryan Lane), collapses in the middle of a wrestling match after "hearing" explosions. House suffers from lack of sleep, which causes him to hallucinate that Amber is with him, helping him to solve the case. House also plans Chase's bachelor party — much to the dismay of Cameron — with the help of Amber. But House soon realizes that Amber is dangerous, and that she is not helpful to the case when Cuddy calls him to let him know that his diagnosis was wrong. The team goes to the hospital after the bachelor party ends suddenly to figure out what is wrong with their patient — after they sober up. Final diagnosis: Sarcoidosis
109	23	"Under My Skin"	David Straiton	Pamela Davis & Lawrence Kaplow	May 4, 2009	12.05
House and the team are given the challenging case of a ballerina (Jamie Tisdale) whose lungs collapse during a rehearsal. After first facing the prospect of never dancing again, the ballerina's future seems even more grim when the treatment causes her skin to fall off. House must solve this daunting puzzle while going to desperate measures to cure his hallucination; he continues to suffer from a severe lack of sleep and is still haunted by Amber. While enlisting Wilson's help to diagnose himself, he is willing to do the unthinkable to make his visions stop. Final diagnosis: Gonorrhea (Penelope) and Vicodin addiction (House)
110	24	"Both Sides Now"	Greg Yaitanes	Doris Egan	May 11, 2009	12.74
House and the team are intrigued by Scott (Ashton Holmes), a man who has undergone a corpus callosotomy procedure to treat epilepsy. Due to this, both sides of his brain are at war for dominance over the body resulting in him having Alien Hand Syndrome where he can't control his left arm. At the same time Cuddy and House try to deal with their relationship after spending the night at his apartment. The next day, House tells Wilson that he has stopped taking drugs and had sex with Cuddy, to which Wilson responds "Wow". But he also tells him that Cuddy may be repressing her feelings for him, and is trying to avoid him. Finally House realizes that his night with Cuddy and her helping him to stop his addiction to Vicodin was all an elaborate hallucination. With his hallucinations spiraling out of control, House is forced to go into a mental health facility after becoming unable to tell fantasy from reality. Final diagnosis: Propylene glycol toxicity (Scott), Pancreatic tumor (Eugene Schwartz) and Psychosis (House)

== Home media ==
Set details				Special features
Country	North America	United Kingdom	Australia	Bonus Featurettes: House Meets a Milestone: The 100th Episode; Keeping It Real: Accuracy in Writing; Dr. Mom: Cuddy's Storyline; Anatomy of a Teaser; House Guests: Casting the Show; Episode Commentary; "Locked In" with Writer/Producer David Foster and Writers/Executive Producers Russel Friend & Garrett Lerner
# episodes	24			Bonus Featurettes: House Meets a Milestone: The 100th Episode; Keeping It Real: Accuracy in Writing; Dr. Mom: Cuddy's Storyline; Anatomy of a Teaser; House Guests: Casting the Show; Episode Commentary; "Locked In" with Writer/Producer David Foster and Writers/Executive Producers Russel Friend & Garrett Lerner
Aspect ratio	1.78:1			Bonus Featurettes: House Meets a Milestone: The 100th Episode; Keeping It Real: Accuracy in Writing; Dr. Mom: Cuddy's Storyline; Anatomy of a Teaser; House Guests: Casting the Show; Episode Commentary; "Locked In" with Writer/Producer David Foster and Writers/Executive Producers Russel Friend & Garrett Lerner
Running time	1060 minutes	1017 minutes		Bonus Featurettes: House Meets a Milestone: The 100th Episode; Keeping It Real: Accuracy in Writing; Dr. Mom: Cuddy's Storyline; Anatomy of a Teaser; House Guests: Casting the Show; Episode Commentary; "Locked In" with Writer/Producer David Foster and Writers/Executive Producers Russel Friend & Garrett Lerner
Audio	Dolby Digital 5.1			Bonus Featurettes: House Meets a Milestone: The 100th Episode; Keeping It Real: Accuracy in Writing; Dr. Mom: Cuddy's Storyline; Anatomy of a Teaser; House Guests: Casting the Show; Episode Commentary; "Locked In" with Writer/Producer David Foster and Writers/Executive Producers Russel Friend & Garrett Lerner
Subtitles	English, Spanish	—N/a	none	Bonus Featurettes: House Meets a Milestone: The 100th Episode; Keeping It Real: Accuracy in Writing; Dr. Mom: Cuddy's Storyline; Anatomy of a Teaser; House Guests: Casting the Show; Episode Commentary; "Locked In" with Writer/Producer David Foster and Writers/Executive Producers Russel Friend & Garrett Lerner
# of discs	5	6		Bonus Featurettes: House Meets a Milestone: The 100th Episode; Keeping It Real: Accuracy in Writing; Dr. Mom: Cuddy's Storyline; Anatomy of a Teaser; House Guests: Casting the Show; Episode Commentary; "Locked In" with Writer/Producer David Foster and Writers/Executive Producers Russel Friend & Garrett Lerner
Region	1 (NTSC)	2 (PAL)	4 (PAL)	Bonus Featurettes: House Meets a Milestone: The 100th Episode; Keeping It Real: Accuracy in Writing; Dr. Mom: Cuddy's Storyline; Anatomy of a Teaser; House Guests: Casting the Show; Episode Commentary; "Locked In" with Writer/Producer David Foster and Writers/Executive Producers Russel Friend & Garrett Lerner
Rating	NOT RATED	18	M	Bonus Featurettes: House Meets a Milestone: The 100th Episode; Keeping It Real: Accuracy in Writing; Dr. Mom: Cuddy's Storyline; Anatomy of a Teaser; House Guests: Casting the Show; Episode Commentary; "Locked In" with Writer/Producer David Foster and Writers/Executive Producers Russel Friend & Garrett Lerner
Release date	August 25, 2009	October 5, 2009	September 29, 2009	Bonus Featurettes: House Meets a Milestone: The 100th Episode; Keeping It Real: Accuracy in Writing; Dr. Mom: Cuddy's Storyline; Anatomy of a Teaser; House Guests: Casting the Show; Episode Commentary; "Locked In" with Writer/Producer David Foster and Writers/Executive Producers Russel Friend & Garrett Lerner
