= List of actors who have played Santa Claus =

This is a list of actors who have played Santa Claus in film and on television, including voice acting roles. This does not count actors whose characters have dressed as Santa Claus. For example, Dan Castellaneta would not be included in this list for voicing Homer Simpson, a character who dressed up as a mall Santa in the pilot episode of The Simpsons. Roles are live action unless appearing in an animated TV special, animated series, or animated film, in which cases they are voice acting roles.

Actor	Film/TV	Media type	Year
Tim Allen	The Santa Clause	film	1994
Tim Allen	The Santa Clause 2	film	2002
Tim Allen	The Santa Clause 3: The Escape Clause	film	2006
Ed Asner	The Story of Santa Claus	animated TV film	1996
Ed Asner	Elf	film	2003
Ed Asner	Christmas on the Bayou	film	2013
Ed Asner	Elf: Buddy's Musical Christmas	animated TV special	2014
Fred Astaire	The Man in the Santa Claus Suit	TV film	1979
Richard Attenborough	Miracle on 34th Street	film	1994
Steve Bacic	Deck the Halls	TV film	2005
Alec Baldwin	Rise of the Guardians	animated film	2012
Leedham Bantock	Santa Claus	film	1912
Don Beddoe	Bewitched, season 4 episode Humbug Not to Be Spoken Here	TV series	1967
Michael Bell	The Powerpuff Girls: 'Twas the Fight Before Christmas	animated TV special	2003
Brian Blessed	The Amazing World of Gumball, season 2 episode Christmas	animated TV series	2012
Brian Blessed	Sooty, season 2 episode Pranks and Presents	TV series (live action)	2013
Brian Blessed	Danger Mouse, season 1 episode The Snowman Cometh	animated TV series	2015
Beau Bridges	The Christmas Secret	TV film	2009
Lloyd Bridges	In the Nick of Time	TV film	1991
Jim Broadbent	Arthur Christmas	animated film	2011
Jim Broadbent	Get Santa	film	2015
Jim Broadbent	Aldi Christmas Launch Advert	advertisement	2020
George Buza	A Christmas Horror Story	film	2015
Sebastian Cabot	Miracle on 34th Street	TV film	1973
John Call	Santa Claus Conquers the Martians	film	1964
Bruce Campbell	The Librarians, episode "And Santa's Midnight Run"	TV series	2014
Douglas Campbell	Once Upon a Christmas	TV film	2000
Art Carney	The Twilight Zone, episode "The Night of the Meek"	TV series	1960
Art Carney	The Great Santa Claus Switch	film	1970
Art Carney	The Night They Saved Christmas	TV film	1984
Jay Clark	Santa and the Ice Cream Bunny	film	1972
Oliver Clark	Ernest Saves Christmas	film	1988
Andy Clyde	The Pepsi-Cola Playhouse	TV series	1954
Andy Clyde	Studio 57	TV series	1955
Tim Conway	Saving Santa	animated film	2013
James Cosmo	The Chronicles of Narnia: The Lion, the Witch and the Wardrobe	film	2005
James Cosmo	The Santa Incident	TV film	2010
Brian Cox	That Christmas	animated film	2024
Bryan Cranston	The Santa Claus Brothers	animated TV special	2001
Hume Cronyn	Santa and Pete	TV special	1999
Peter Cullen	Christmas Comes to Pac-Land	animated TV special	1982
Andy Devine	Batman, season 2 episode The Duo is Slumming	TV series	1966
Dileep	My Santa	film	2019
Bob Dorough	The Clarks		1991
Charles Durning	It Nearly Wasn't Christmas	TV special	1989
Charles Durning	Mrs. Santa Claus	TV special	1996
Charles Durning	Elmo Saves Christmas	TV special	1996
Charles Durning	Mr. St. Nick	TV special	2002
Charles Durning	A Boyfriend for Christmas	TV special	2004
Kort Falkenberg	The Super Mario Bros. Super Show!, episode Santa Claus Is Coming to Flatbush	TV series	1989
Robert Fliss	Mighty Morphin Power Rangers season 3 episode, I'm Dreaming of a White Ranger	TV series	1995
Stan Francis	Rudolph the Red-Nosed Reindeer	animated TV special	1964
Paul Frees	Frosty the Snowman	animated TV special	1969
Paul Frees	The First Easter Rabbit	animated TV special	1976
Paul Frees	Rudolph's Shiny New Year	animated TV special	1976
Paul Frees	Nestor, the Long-Eared Christmas Donkey	animated TV special	1977
Nick Frost	Doctor Who, episode "Last Christmas"	TV episode	2014
Paul Giamatti	Fred Claus	film	2007
Mel Gibson	Fatman	film	2020
Bill Goldberg	Santa's Slay	film	2005
John Goodman	Rudolph the Red-Nosed Reindeer: The Movie	animated film	1998
John Goodman	The Year Without a Santa Claus	film (live action)	2006
John Goodman	It's a SpongeBob Christmas!	animated TV special	2012
A. Cameron Grant	I Love Lucy Christmas Show	TV series	1956
Richard Griffiths	A Muppets Christmas: Letters to Santa	TV special	2008
Michael Gross	Becoming Santa	TV film	2015
Steve Guttenberg	Single Santa Seeks Mrs. Claus	film	2004
Edmund Gwenn	Miracle on 34th Street	film	1947
Alan Hale, Jr.	Gilligan's Island, season 1 episode Birds Gotta Fly, Fish Gotta Talk	TV series	1964
Tom Hanks	The Polar Express	animated film	2004
David Harbour	Violent Night	film	2022
Nigel Hawthorne	Call Me Claus	TV film	2001
Isaac Hayes	The Pullmans		1993
Bob Holt	The Bear Who Slept Through Christmas	animated TV special	1973
William Hootkins	Like Father, Like Santa	TV film	1998
David Huddleston	Santa Claus: The Movie	film	1985
Edward Ivory	The Nightmare Before Christmas	animated film	1993
Peeter Jakobi	Rare Exports: A Christmas Tale	film	2010
Kevin James	Elmo's Christmas Countdown	TV film	2007
Bob Joles	Uncle Grandpa, episode "Christmas Special"	animated TV series	2014
James Earl Jones	Recess Christmas: Miracle on Third Street	animated TV special	2001
Cecil Kellaway	Bewitched, season 1 episode "A Vision of Sugar Plums"	TV series	1964
Jay Brazeau	Noelle	film	2019
Phil LaMarr	Foster's Home for Imaginary Friends, episode “A Lost Claus”	animated TV series	2005
Bill Lewis	Defending Christmas	TV film	1993
Sal Lizard	The Box	film	2009
John Malkovich	Santabear's High Flying Adventure	animated TV film	1987
Dakin Matthews	The Big Bang Theory, season 6 episode "The Santa Simulation"	TV series	2012
Paul Maxey	The Magical World of Disney, episode "Holiday Time at Disneyland"	TV series	1962
Chuck McCann	A Very Retail Christmas	TV film	1990
Bruce McGill	Family Guy, season 9 episode Road to the North Pole	animated TV series	2010
Matt McKenna	American Dad!, Episodes: S 6 Ep 8: For Whom the Sleigh Bell Tolls (2010); S 8 Ep 6: Minstrel Krampus (2012); S 14 Ep 7: Ninety North, Zero West (2016); S 15 Ep 1: Santa, Schmanta (2017)	animated TV series	Multiple
Mark Mitchell	The Munsters' Scary Little Christmas	TV film	1996
Thomas Mitchell	The Miracle on 34th Street	TV film	1955
Jose Elias Moreno	Santa Claus	film	1959
Robert Morse	Teen Titans Go! vs. Teen Titans	animated TV film	2019
Ferdinard Munier	Babes in Toyland	film	1934
Ferdinard Munier	Lake Placid Serenade	film	1944
Ferdinard Munier	Road to Utopia	film	1946
Richard Mulligan	The Twilight Zone, episode "Night of the Meek"	TV series	1985
Leslie Nielsen	All I Want For Christmas	film	1991
Leslie Nielsen	Santa Who?	TV film	2000
Dick O'Neill	The Fresh Prince of Bel-Air, season 5 episode "Reality Bites"	TV episode	1994
Trey Parker	The Spirit of Christmas	animated short film	1995
Bert Parnaby	The Lion, the Witch and the Wardrobe	TV series	1988
Austin Pendleton	Christmas with the Kranks	film	2004
Phil Pierce	A Bad Moms Christmas	film	2017
Richard Riehle	The Hebrew Hammer	film	2003
Richard Riehle	The Search for Santa Paws	film	2010
Richard Riehle	A Very Harold & Kumar 3D Christmas	film	2011
Mickey Rooney	Santa Claus Is Comin' to Town	animated TV special	1970
Mickey Rooney	The Year Without a Santa Claus	animated TV special	1974
Mickey Rooney	Rudolph and Frosty's Christmas in July	animated TV special	1979
Mickey Rooney	The Happy Elf	animated TV special	2005
Mickey Rooney	A Miser Brothers' Christmas	animated TV special	2008
Jan Rubeš	One Magic Christmas	film	1985
Kurt Russell	The Christmas Chronicles	film	2018
Kurt Russell	The Christmas Chronicles 2	film	2020
Will Sasso	Finding Mrs. Claus	TV film	2002
Douglas Seale	Amazing Stories, season 1 episode "Santa '85"	TV series	1985
Douglas Seale	Ernest Saves Christmas	film	1988
William Shatner	Eek! The Cat, season 2 episode "It's a Very Merry Eek's Mas"	animated TV series	1993
William Shatner	Gotta Catch Santa Claus	animated TV special	2008
Peter Shukoff	Epic Rap Battles of History, season 2 episode "Moses vs. Santa Claus"	YouTube video series	2012
J. K. Simmons	Klaus	animated film	2019
J. K. Simmons	Red One	film	2024
Hal Smith	The Flintstones, season 5 episode Christmas Flintstone	animated TV series	1964
Hal Smith	The Brady Bunch, season 1	TV series (live action)	1969
Hal Smith	Santa and the Three Bears	animated TV special	1970
Hal Smith	A Christmas Story	animated TV special	1972
Hal Smith	A Flintstone Christmas	animated TV special	1977
Hal Smith	Casper's First Christmas	animated TV special	1979
Hal Smith	Yogi's First Christmas	animated TV special	1980
Hal Smith	Midnight Patrol: Adventures in the Dream Zone	animated TV series	1990
Hal Smith	Bonkers	animated TV series	1993
Hal Smith	The Town Santa Forgot	animated TV special	1993
Donavon Stinson	A Fairly Odd Christmas	TV film	2012
Donavon Stinson	Santa Hunters	film	2014
Paul Sorvino	Santa Baby 2: Christmas Maybe	TV film	2009
Jim Staahl	Grandma Got Run Over by a Reindeer	animated TV film	2001
Fred Tatasciore	Scooby Doo! Haunted Holidays	animated film	2012
Ricky Tomlinson	Robbie the Reindeer: Hooves of Fire	animated TV special	1999
Dick Van Patten	A Mouse, a Mystery and Me	TV film	1987
Dick Van Patten	The Santa Trap	TV film	2002
Robert Wagner	Northpole	TV film	2014
Frank Welker	A Chipmunk Christmas	animated TV special	1981
Frank Welker	A Wish for Wings That Work	animated TV special	1991
George Wendt	Santa Baby	film	2006
George Wendt	Santa Buddies	film	2009
John Wheeler	Step by Step, season 7 episode "Too Many Santas"	TV series	1997
John Wheeler	Single Santa Seeks Mrs. Claus	TV film	2004
John Wheeler	Meet the Santas	TV film	2005
Keith Wickham	Thomas & Friends, episode "Last Train For Christmas"	animated TV series	2014
Biff Wiff	I Think You Should Leave with Tim Robinson	TV series	2021
Jonathan Winters	Santa vs. the Snowman	animated TV special	1997
Ed Wynn	Miracle on 34th Street	TV film	1959

== See also ==
- Santa Claus in film
