= Simple Explanation =

- House episode
- Episode no.: Season 5 Episode 20
- Directed by: Greg Yaitanes
- Written by: Leonard Dick
- Original air date: April 6, 2009

Guest appearances
- Colleen Camp as Charlotte Novack; Mary Jo Deschanel as Julia Kutner; Ed Brigadier as Richard Kutner; Meat Loaf Aday as Eddie Novack

Episode chronology
← Previous "Locked In"	Next → "Saviors"
- House season 5

"Simple Explanation" is the 20th episode of the fifth season of House. It first aired on Fox on April 6, 2009.

== Plot ==
As Eddie Novack (Meat Loaf) lies on his deathbed, his wife Charlotte is stricken with respiratory failure. The team takes Charlotte's case and wheels Eddie into her room, as he seems to gain strength when he sees her suffering. Foreman suggests that she has melioidosis. The team start her on an IV drip and aciclovir, which works, until she starts gasping. Thirteen suggests polyserositis, so the team starts Charlotte on indomethacin. Taub does an echo-cardiogram on Eddie to see if his heart's improving, but it isn't.

Kutner does not show up for work, and House dispatches Thirteen and Foreman to check his apartment. Thirteen finds Kutner's body; he has died by suicide. The team must then try to save Charlotte while struggling to make sense of Kutner's death. House, Thirteen and Foreman go to see Kutner's parents, but House blames the parents and leaves. Taub seems to show little interest in Kutner's death. Cuddy tells the team she's hired a grief counselor and offers them time off. She then goes to talk to Wilson, who hasn't been with House yet. Wilson goes with House to Kutner's home. House looks around and finally suspects that someone murdered Kutner. House suspects it was the same person who killed Kutner's birth parents.

House eventually realizes Charlotte feigned her illness, but then her liver fails. She then tries to take her own life by overdosing so that Eddie can have her heart. Foreman takes time off.

The team manages to stabilize Charlotte, but the drugs she took damaged her liver. House gets Cameron to convince Eddie to do a partial liver transplant. With his failing heart, he's bound to die on the table. Then they can give his whole liver to Charlotte, which is what she needs, not part of one. House gets Cameron to convince Eddie to do this. He wants to say goodbye to her, but Cameron notes she would never agree to this if she knew what would happen. As Eddie signs off on the transplant, Cameron notices nodules on Eddie's fingers, which could indicate that his condition might be curable. Meanwhile, House finds out that the murderer of Kutner's birth parents died of an aneurysm two months before. Eddie still wants to proceed with the liver donation, but Taub reveals to Charlotte that Eddie can be cured. House realizes Charlotte was in Rio without telling Eddie, where she contracted visceral leishmaniasis. The team starts her on antimony.

Before Cuddy leaves for the funeral, Taub says that they diagnosed Charlotte too late and she will die. Cuddy offers Taub a ride which he refuses. Cuddy says that Charlotte's death bought them more time to save Eddie and to transplant her heart which will give her death meaning, but Taub says it won't. Taub stays with Charlotte and Eddie until she dies. He then walks out into the corridor and breaks down crying. House goes to Kutner's apartment to look for an explanation. The rest of the team attend Kutner's funeral.

== Production ==
Kutner's suicide was scripted due to actor Kal Penn's decision to accept the position of Associate Director of the White House Office of Public Liaison in President Barack Obama's administration.

== Release ==
Leading up to the premiere of "Simple Explanation", Fox aired commercials suggesting that the episode would contain a major event, calling the episode, "beyond words".

=== Critical reception ===
Kutner's death was criticized in The Star-Ledger, with columnist Alan Sepinwall arguing that the death was pointless, and seemingly written only to create a "very special episode." The A.V. Club praised the episode for its surprising twist, but also claimed that the sudden death of a major character for no discernible reason was "a dramatic cheap shot". Entertainment Weekly commended the show's handling of the death, believing that it was presented in a dramatically effective and realistic manner.
