= When Will I Be Loved (disambiguation) =

When Will I Be Loved is a 1960 single by The Everly Brothers covered in 1975 by Linda Ronstadt.

When Will I Be Loved may also refer to:

- When Will I Be Loved?, a 1990 television film directed by Michael Tuchner
- When Will I Be Loved (film), a 2004 film directed by James Toback
