= Digital Juice =

Digital Juice may refer to:

- Digital Juice, Inc., a company that produces stock multimedia content.
- Digital Juice (anime), a 2002 DVD of short animations produced by Studio 4°C
- djuice
