= Aliens vs. Avatars =

2011 science fiction "mockbuster" film

- Directed by: Lewis Schoenbrun
- Written by: Keith Parker; Kenny White
- Story by: Ted Chalmers
- Produced by: Ted Chalmers; David S. Sterling; Charlie Vaughn
- Starring: Jason Lockhart; Cassie Fliegel; Dylan Vox
- Cinematography: Art Butler
- Edited by: Lewis Schoenbrun
- Music by: Jason Peri
- Production company: Tomcat Films
- Release date: September 20, 2011
- Running time: 80 minutes
- Country: United States
- Language: English

Aliens vs. Avatars is a 2011 American science fiction film directed by Lewis Schoenbrun. The film is a mockbuster of Alien vs. Predator and Avatar. The film follows the intergalactic battle between a quarrelsome alien race and shape-shifting extraterrestrials, while six college friends find themselves in the middle of the interstellar war. The film stars Jason Lockhart, Kim Argetsinger, Dylan Vox, Georgina Totentino, Marlene Mc'Cohen and Ginny You. Aliens vs. Avatars was released onto video, DVD and TV on September 20, 2011. As of 2021, the film's distributor, Summer Hill Entertainment, refers to the film as "Alien vs. Alien".

== Cast ==
- Jason Lockhart as Tyler
- Kim Argetsinger as Jesse
- Cassie Fliegel as Ava
- Dylan Vox as Jake
- Marlene Mc'Cohen as Tiffany
- Ginny You as Dana
- Georgina Tolentino as Crystal

== Production ==
The film was shot in Los Angeles, California in the summer of 2010. At the time, its director, Lewis Schoenbrun, was completing post-production work for the film The Amazing Bulk. Shoenbrun considered Aliens vs. Avatars to be a more difficult film to produce, mostly due to multiple shooting locations.

== Release and reception ==
Aliens vs. Avatars did not receive a theatrical release, and was released directly to video, DVD, and television on September 20, 2011. In 2011, it was Schoenbrun's most widely released film.

Horror film blogger Baron Craze panned the movie, saying "[The production's contributors] contribute to an inept dialogue of half baked thoughts, concepts, and Swiss cheese drivel. [...] While cheap effects work for straight-up b-movies, it still needs some fun, and entertainment factor, [...] however this film miss every grade, and contains a laundry list of problems, namely boredom. Similarly, another reviewer named Richard Scheib called it "a marginally better made film of the type that is usually shot on a camcorder over successive weekends by teenage wannabes." The film apparently was better received on the home video market in Japan, with at least one personal reviewer giving it 5/5 stars, saying "At the times in our lives when things get too hectic, we need an utterly useless Z-movie like this to give us time to decompress. There is a price for this kind of pick-me-up that's needed every once in a while. That price is only 500 yen."

In 2012, Aliens vs. Avatars' production studio Tomcat films sued hundreds of "John Doe" defendants in US federal court for allegedly illegally downloading the film in 2012, a suit which has been called a case of copyright trolling.
