= John Wheeler (actor) =

American actor (1930–2026)

- Born: Johnnie Lee Wheeler Jr. June 20, 1930; Corsicana, Texas, U.S.
- Died: February 6, 2026 (aged 95); Claremont, California, U.S.
- Occupation: Actor
- Years active: 1958–2005
- Spouse: Helen Wheeler (m. 1959; death 2013)

Johnnie Lee Wheeler Jr. (June 20, 1930 – February 6, 2026) was an American actor, best known as the singing restaurant manager in the classic 1971 "You Deserve A Break Today" McDonald's commercial featuring singing employees singing as they clean and get the restaurant ready to open. He graduated from the University of the Pacific in 1952 with a Bachelor of Music degree. Wheeler died at his home in Claremont, California, on February 6, 2026, at the age of 95.

== Filmography ==
=== Film ===
Year	Title	Role	Notes
1968	Live a Little, Love a Little	Workman	Uncredited
1969	Sweet Charity	Dancer	
1969	The Good Guys and the Bad Guys	Bumper	Uncredited
1969	Tell Them Willie Boy Is Here	Newman	
1970	Move	Brown Package	
1971	Support Your Local Gunfighter	Croupier	
1973	Vice Squad Women	Detective Ray Farnum	
1974	Mame	Judge Bregoff	
1974	Newman's Law	Eastman's dinner guest	Uncredited
1974	Big Bad Mama	Lawyer	
1977	Bad Georgia Road	Dub Douchette	
1978	Sgt. Pepper's Lonely Hearts Club Band	Mr. Fields	
1979	The North Avenue Irregulars	Clothier	
1979	The Apple Dumpling Gang Rides Again	Conductor	
1980	Seed of Innocence	Tammer	
1981	Separate Ways	Worker #1	
1987	Banzai Runner	Hawkins	
1987	Cold Steel	Mahoney	
1995	Apollo 13	Reporter	

=== Television ===
Year	Title	Role	Notes
1958	Wonderful Town	Officer Lonigan	Television film
1960	Golden Child	Caller	Television film
1967	Star Trek: The Original Series	Gav	Episode: "Journey to Babel"
1968, 1971	Bonanza	Hill / Bartender	2 episodes
1960	Death Valley Days	John Burke	Episode: "Green Is the Color of Gold"
1969	The Outsider	Montana	Episode: "Handle with Care"
1969	The Silent Gun	Second Townsman	Television film
1969–1971	Green Acres	Various roles	4 episodes
1970	Then Came Bronson	Herb Perry	Episode: "A-Pickin' An' A-Singin'"
1970	Mannix	Second Zoo Attendant	Episode: "A Ticket to the Eclipse"
1970–1974	The Brady Bunch	Various roles	3 episodes
1971–1975	The Odd Couple	Various roles	4 episodes
1972	Mission: Impossible	Crowley	Episode: "Bag Woman"
1972	Columbo	Client of 'Eve Babcock'	Episode: "The Most Crucial Game"
1972	Adam-12	Wilbur	Episode: "The Vendetta"
1972–1973	Love, American Style	Bailiff	4 episodes
1974	Here's Lucy	Mr. Blake	Episode: "Meanwhile, Back at the Office"
1974	Happy Days	Mr. Crenshaw	Episode: "The Deadly Dares"
1974	Honky Tonk	Bank Manager	Television film
1974	Emergency!	Felix	Episode: "Nagging Suspicion"
1975	Gunsmoke	Waiter	Episode: "I Have Promises to Keep"
1976	The Waltons	Leonard Gormley	Episode: "The Test"
1976	Van Dyke and Company	Mr. Haley	Episode #1.9
1977	The Richard Pryor Special?	Security Guard	Television film
1978	With This Ring	Bell Captain	Television film
1978	Kate Bliss and the Ticker Tape Kid	Telegraph Operator	Television film
1978	Rescue from Gilligan's Island	Studio Guard	Television film
1978	The Rockford Files	Cliff	Episode: "Kill the Messenger"
1978	CHiPs	Wally	Episode: "Return of the Turks"
1978	Rhoda	Harvey	Episode: "The Date in the Iron Mask"
1979	The Wild Wild West Revisited	Henry	Television film
1980	It's a Living	Customer	Episode: "Fallen Idol"
1982	Dallas	Apartment Manager	Episode: "Goodbye, Cliff Barnes"
1982	The Dukes of Hazzard	Mr. Rhuebottom	4 episodes
1983	Simon & Simon	Burt	Episode: "The Skeleton Who Came Out of the Closet"
1986	Hotel	Cab Driver	Episode: "Undercurrents"
1988	The Golden Girls	Patron	Episode: "Mister Terrific"
1989	Night Court	Mr. Perine	Episode: "From Snoop to Nuts: Part 2"
1989	The Hollywood Detective	Jack	Television film
1989, 1990	Life Goes On	Announcer / Coach McNuiffy	2 episodes
1990	The Bradys	Joe Fletcher	Episode: "The Brady 500"
1990	Good Grief	Skippy	Episode: "Cub Scouts and Horses & Whiskers on Kittens"
1991	Lucy & Desi: Before the Laughter	William Frawley	Television film
1991	True Colors	Head Monk	Episode: "Splendor in the Basement"
1991	Runaway Father	Judge Ciglio	Television film
1992	Baby Talk	Minister	Episode: "Scenes from a Marriage"
1994	Lois & Clark: The New Adventures of Superman	Shop Owner	Episode: "Madame Ex"
1994	ER	Mr. Resnick	Episode: "Going Home"
1996	Mrs. Santa Claus	Man in Santa Suit	Television film
1997	L.A. Heat	Jonathan Quincy	Episode: "Daybomber"
1997	Step by Step	Santa	Episode: "Too Many Santas"
1998	Team Knight Rider	Barber	Episode: "Home Away from Home"
1998	Beverly Hills, 90210	Greg Redborn	Episode: "All That Glitters"
2001	The Huntress	Harry	Episode: "The Quest: Part 1"
2004	Single Santa Seeks Mrs. Claus	Santa Claus	Television film
2005	Meet the Santas	Santa Claus	Television film
