= Al Schwartz (producer) =

American television producer (born 1932)

- Born: Allen Schwartz; January 3, 1932 (age 93); Chicago, Illinois, U.S.
- Occupation(s): Television producer, director
- Years active: 1953–present
- Spouse: Jayne Boyd Knoerzer
- Children: Scott; Jill; Wendy

Allen "Al" Schwartz (born January 3, 1932) is an American television producer who has produced a variety of shows in association with Dick Clark. He is best known for producing award shows such as the American Music Awards and the Golden Globe Awards. Shows that he co-produced were nominated for Daytime Emmy Awards three times and for a Primetime Emmy Award once.

== Early life ==
Schwartz was born January 3, 1932, in Chicago, Illinois, where he attended Lowell Grammar School and Roosevelt High School. After graduating from Wright Junior College in 1951, he attended the University of Wisconsin–Madison. At the University of Wisconsin, Schwartz was a student in the first television class created at the university, president of the Entertainers Guild, served on the Executive Board of The Haresfoot Club, and appeared in Haresfoot show productions.

== Career ==
After graduating from the University of Wisconsin in 1953 with a B.S. degree, Schwartz was hired in July by the then-new WKOW-TV, an ABC-affiliated television station in Madison, Wisconsin. At the station, he hosted two daily television shows: "Al's Pals," a children's show in the afternoon, and "Club 27," a late night show featuring University and professional talent.

Schwartz was drafted into the United States Army in 1954 as a private and served until 1956. He was assigned to special services Armed Forces Far East to variety shows for officer and non-commissioned officer clubs. In 1955, he was designated as a liaison to Ed Sullivan, an American entertainment writer and television host. Part of his service involved introducing Sullivan to military and Japanese talent on Sullivan's trip to Tokyo that year.

After his tour of duty in the army, Schwartz resumed his television career by joining WBBM-TV, a CBS owned-and-operated television station located in Chicago, Illinois. Initially hired in as a stage manager, Schwartz advanced through positions such as associate director, director, and producer. He was the stage manager for the historic first debate between Richard Nixon and John F. Kennedy in 1960. For the station, Schwartz directed Cyrano D'Bergerac and International Hour - American Jazz as well as documentaries such as Women in Prison and The Unwed Mother. He was nominated for an Emmy for directing the 1963 The Ghost of Mr Kicks with Oscar Brown, Jr. While in Chicago, Schwartz studied at The Second City, an improvisational comedy enterprise that originated in the Old Town, Chicago neighborhood. He also appeared as a stand-up comic at The Chesterfield Supper Club, The Black Orchid, the Gate of Horn, and the Small World with Bill Daily and Ann Elder.

In October 1963, Schwartz married Jayne Boyd Knoerzer, one of the first two original Doublemint Twins. They went on to have three children.

In 1964, Schwartz partnered with Hal Wallace to form Schwartz Wallace Productions. Together they produced Emmy award documentaries such as The Many Moods of Ravinia, The Sound of Ravinia with Japanese conductor Seiji Ozawa, and The World of Andrew Wyeth hosted by American film and stage actor Henry Fonda. In 1968, Schwartz traveled to California to produce and direct The John Gary Show in Hollywood. The next year, he returned to Hollywood to direct the ABC television series "What's It All About World?" starring Dean Jones. From 1969 to 1973, Schwartz produced and directed shows for Allen Ludden, Sid & Marty Krofft's Far Out Space Nuts and Wonderbug, and Donny & Marie (1976 TV series).

In 1973 he began working for American radio and television personality Dick Clark, an association that lasted more than 30 years until his retirement as a senior vice president at Dick Clark Productions. Together they produced shows such as NBC's Dick Clark's Good Ol Days, My Three Sons, Thanksgiving Reunion with The Partridge Family (1977). Schwartz went on to create The Man in the Santa Claus Suit, a 1979 TV-Movie starring dancer Fred Astaire as Santa Claus. Their productions of the Soap Opera Digest Awards were nominated for the Daytime Emmy Award for Outstanding Special Class Program in 1988, 1989, and 1990. Schwartz's production of the 64th Annual Golden Globe Awards was nominated for a Primetime Emmy for Outstanding Special Class Program in 2007.

Through the Academy Awards, Schwartz traveled around the world producing special Academy Awards segments in Tokyo, Paris, London, New York, Calcutta, Sri Lanka, and at the NASA White Sands Test Facility in White Sands, New Mexico. In 2013, Schwartz produced Masters of Illusion, a magic-based television series for Associated Television International.

In 2004, he was named to the board of directors of the Museum of Broadcast Communications in Chicago.
