= Saving Angelo =

Saving Angelo is a 2007 Dominic Scott Kay-directed short film based on the true events of a white boxer that he and his family rescued in 2003. All promotions and earnings went to animal charity projects.

In January 2007, Kay filed a lawsuit claiming that producer Conroy Kanter "unfairly demanded creative control and distribution rights" for the film. The suit was settled out of court with Kay receiving "full ownership and control" of the film, along with a $20,000 donation to Crusades for Animals.

== Credited cast ==
Actors/Actresses	Role
Dominic Scott Kay	Danny
Eric Close	Dad
Kevin Bacon	Brent
Julie Gonzalo	Receptionist
Dana Barron	Mom
Conroy Kanter	Veterinarian 1
Christopher Close	Veterinarian 2
Scott Kay	Fireman
Ryan King	Vet Tech
Kuma (dog)	Angelo

=== Awards and nominations ===
Award	Year	Category	Result	Cast/Crew
Young Artist Award	2007	Best Performance in a Short Film - Young Actor	Nominated	Dominic Scott Kay
Jury Award	2008	Best Short Film	Won	Dominic Scott Kay
