= As Good as Dead (1995 film) =

- Genre: Thriller; Drama; Mystery
- Written by: Larry Cohen
- Directed by: Larry Cohen
- Starring: Crystal Bernard; Judge Reinhold; Traci Lords
- Music by: Patrick O'Hearn
- Country of origin: United States
- Original language: English

Production
- Executive producer: Artie Mandelberg
- Producer: Larry Cohen
- Production location: San Diego
- Cinematography: Billy Dickson
- Editor: Neil Mandelberg
- Running time: 91 minutes
- Production companies: CMN Pictures; Wilshire Court Productions; Larco Productions; Paramount Television

Original release
- Network: USA Network
- Release: May 10, 1995

As Good as Dead is a 1995 American television film written, produced, and directed by Larry Cohen. The psychological thriller, originally broadcast on USA Network on May 10, 1995, stars Crystal Bernard, Judge Reinhold and Traci Lords. The film was released on VHS in 1998.

== Plot ==
Nicole is a makeup artist with an ulcer. She befriends Susan at a club. Susan harbors a sadness over the death of her mother and the fact that her father left when she was two years old. Nicole takes Susan to her house where she shows her the location of the spare key and lends her some clothes. Nicole invites Susan to a party at a fancy house where she admits to Susan that she spent time in jail for shoplifting. After drinking alcohol her ulcer flares up and Susan drives her to the hospital. Nicole does not have insurance so they use Susan's name and insurance to sign her in.

Susan takes medical leave from work. She calls the hospital for information about the patient checked in under her name but the staff refuses to give her any information. She calls her office to check her voicemail but is informed that "Susan Warfield" died in the hospital. She finds that her apartment has been rented and her belongings have been repossessed.

Susan learns that Nicole's body was taken from the hospital and cremated at a ceremony paid for by a man claiming to be her brother "Aaron Warfield" even though Susan has no brothers. Her ATM card is rejected so she takes a bus to Nicole's apartment and begins wearing her clothes. She learns that the death was due to a transfusion of the wrong type of blood and fears that she could be accused of manslaughter for having given incorrect medical information so she assumes Nicole's identity completely and visits the lawyer, who says that he is suing for $10 million for negligence and tells her where "Aaron Warfield" is staying in a hotel.

At the hotel, she finds the room of the wrong Warfield and encounters her own father Edgar Warfield, whom she has never met but recognizes from an old wedding photograph. Edgar confirms that "Aaron Warfield" is his son (therefore her half-brother) and warns her to stay away from him because he does not treat women well. She confronts him about the daughter he never knew and he says that he returned to town for her funeral and met up with Aaron, who was already in town. She leaves her phone number as "Nicole" and returns to the hospital, where she learns that a technician named Eddie Garcia was fired for entering the blood type as B− instead of A−, though Eddie argues that he saw someone watching him enter the computer access code and that person must have used it to change the data.

A police car turns on its sirens when it sees Susan driving Nicole's car because Nicole had a warrant due to several unpaid parking tickets. While escaping Susan nearly runs into a car driven by a pianist named Ron, who shows great interest in her and asks her to dinner. After dinner she finds that someone has broken into her apartment through the front door and Ron offers to stay in case the intruder returns. Susan tells him about the half-brother and lets him repair the door but does not let him stay the night so Ron sleeps in his car and sees a man snooping around the house in the night but the man escapes.

The next day Ron and Susan to the hotel to get a picture of Aaron to show to Eddie Garcia. She is surprised that Ron is given the key to Aaron's room simply by asking for it. In the room Susan finds a picture of Edgar with a man she believes to be Aaron. She insists on showing the picture around the hospital alone while Ron goes to Eddie Garcia's apartment, where Ron explains that he can relate to Eddie because he was also fired from a hospital for stealing drugs. Eddie tries to escape, but Ron catches him and throws him off the fire escape to his death.

Ron picks Susan up from the hospital and drives her to Eddie's place, where they find police surrounding the building and are told that Eddie committed suicide. The attorneys inform Edgar Warfield of the suicide and that the hospital is willing to settle because it appears to be an admission of guilt. Edgar calls Susan and arranges to meet her to scatter the ashes over the ocean before his flight departs.

Ron becomes suspicious because of Susan's avoidance of the police, so Susan invents a story for her new persona "Nicole" about being a convicted shoplifter. Ron urges her to confess more, but she convinces him to rush to the meeting with Edgar. On the ride there, he accuses her of using Susan for her money and of trying to shake down the family to get some of the insurance money, revealing that he is Aaron Warfield and caused the death of Susan because she refused to lend him money. He is also jealous of his father Edgar's closer relationship with his physical therapist Henry, the man shown in the photograph with him, and proposes that they join forces to take Edgar's money. Susan refuses to join him and runs over to Edgar, confessing to him that she is Susan. Completely losing it, Aaron declares his intention to kill both Susan and Edgar and attempts to throw Susan off a cliff into the ocean. Edgar pulls them back from the brink and Aaron attempts to throw his father off the edge as well. Susan finally stops him by throwing Nicole's ashes in Aaron's eyes, blinding him, and as a result, Aaron himself ends up accidentally stumbling and falling off the edge of the cliff to his death. Susan loses her job but avoids felony charges and finally gets a chance to get to know her father.

== Cast ==
- Crystal Bernard as Susan Warfield
- Judge Reinhold as Ron Holden/Aaron Warfield
- Traci Lords as Nicole Grace
- Carlos Carrasco as Eddie Garcia
- George Dickerson as Mr. Edgar Warfield
- Daniel McDonald as Thomas A. Rutherford
- Ivonne Coll as Mexican woman
- Scott Williamson as Dr. Sullivan
- Jerry Bernard as Funeral Director
- Thomas Prisco as Hospital Technician
- Daniel Shriver as Roger
- Myrna Niles as Mrs. Connor
- Kathleen Marshall as Crosswell Receptionist

== Production ==
Larry Cohen chose Traci Lords for the role of Nicole Grace against the producers' wishes. Rod Taylor was considered for the role of Edgar Warfield but was ultimately not chosen because his salary demands exceeded the budget, even though Cohen offered to cover part of it from his own salary. The film was shot in San Diego in about two weeks and a half.

== Release ==
The British Board of Film Classification gave the film a PG rating without any cuts.

== Reception ==
Tony Scott of Variety.com called the film "filled with possibilities longing to be realized" and complained that "San Diego is being used as L.A.’s stand-in."

Jon Abrams of dailygrindhouse.com called it "an entertaining little ride that works as a low-key version of Cohen’s ‘80s thrillers like SPECIAL EFFECTS and PERFECT STRANGERS."

In a negative review for obsessivemovienerd.com, Matt Wedge wrote, "As Good as Dead is obvious and mostly lackluster. But it’s also a sad project for what it represents: the final film written, produced, and directed by Larry Cohen."
