= Cassie Fliegel =

American actress and screenwriter

- Born: 1984 (age 41–42); Cambridge, Massachusetts
- Education: Harvard University

Cassie Fliegel (born 1984) is an American actress and news anchor.

== Education ==
Fliegel attended high school at Cambridge Rindge and Latin School in Cambridge, Massachusetts and pursued a higher education at Harvard University. At Harvard, she majored in English studies and acted in several plays at the American Repertory Theater.

== Selected filmography ==
=== Television ===
- L.A. Forensics (2007)
- Greek (2007)
- The Office (2008)
- Raising the Bar (2009)
- Nip/Tuck (2009)

=== Film ===
- Don't Look in the Cellar (2008)
- The 41-Year-Old Virgin Who Knocked Up Sarah Marshall and Felt Superbad About It (2010)
- Kissing Strangers (2010)
- The Tommyknockerz (2011 short)
- Aliens vs. Avatars (2011)
- Night of the Dead (2012)
