= Locked In (House) =

- House episode
- Episode no.: Season 5 Episode 19
- Directed by: Dan Attias
- Written by: Russel Friend; Garrett Lerner; David Foster
- Original air date: March 30, 2009

Guest appearances
- Faune Chambers as Molly; John Kapelos as Dr. Kurtz; Mos Def as Lee

Episode chronology
← Previous "Here Kitty"	Next → "Simple Explanation"
- House season 5

"Locked In" is the nineteenth episode of the fifth season of House. It aired on Fox on March 30, 2009. Large portions of the episode are shown from the perspective of the patient, who retains consciousness but lacks the ability to move. After discovering the patient in an emergency room while being treated for injuries related to a motorbike crash, House's team move the patient to Princeton Plainsboro and attempts to diagnose him. During the course of treatment, the team discovers several medically relevant secrets about the patient. Other plot points focus on Wilson's attempts to discover why House was in Middletown, New York when he crashed, Wilson's new relationship, and the resolution of Taub's resignation from the previous episode.

== Plot ==
House is injured in a motorcycle accident in Middletown, New York, and finds himself in bed next to a patient (Mos Def) suffering from locked-in syndrome after a bicycling accident. His attending doctor diagnoses brain death, and suggests transplanting his heart into another patient. House notices the patient following the doctors with his eyes, and is immediately interested in taking up his case. Thirteen suggests a well-placed tumor, so the team does an MRI. House sees a lesion on the scan. However, the patient's attending thinks the patient has an infection and has him on antibiotics. House tells the patient if he has cancer, the antibiotics could kill him. However, they could almost kill him, in which case it would confirm that the patient doesn't have an infection. Just then, the patient seizes. Communicating through blinking, the patient requests transfer to Princeton Plainsboro.

The team plans to do a brain biopsy on the new patient, but he loses his eyelid movement in the operation, and with that, his only way to communicate with the doctors. Dr. Taub suggests they should use a brain–computer interface for communication with the patient. It takes the patient a while, but he finally manages to shift the arrow up, showing he's still mentally present. Communicating via yes or no (up for yes and down for no) on the computer, the team takes the patient's history. He claims he did not visit St. Louis, contradicting his wife. Because he is unable to explain himself, his wife concludes that he has had an affair. Further investigation reveals that the patient has stayed at a friend's home, in order to maintain the facade of a successful business. Unbeknownst to his wife, he was moonlighting as a janitor, where he was exposed to cadmium, leading the team to believe that he has heavy metal poisoning.

Thirteen notices that he has a tear in the epithelial cells in his eye, and a fluorescein stain reveals ulcerative keratitis. Cameron suggests the team does a lumbar puncture, noting that polys (polymorphonuclear leukocytes) would mean it's varicella, and lymphs, Behçet's. During the lumbar puncture however, the patient crashes. They bring him back, but his foot starts to itch, which he manages to communicate to the team after several questions. This indicates liver failure. Thirteen suggests that the dying liver released toxins which led to locked-in syndrome. Foreman suggests that the liver, kidney and eye point towards sclerosing cholangitis. House orders a biopsy to confirm.

As the team gets ready to perform the biopsy, Kutner notices a rash on Thirteen's wrist, where some of the patient's urine had spilled. He deduces that it is a rash due to leptospirosis, which was transferred from rats, living in the basement where the patient had stayed. Sure enough, the patient has a paper cut on his index finger. The treatment is started, and Kutner manages to get the patient to lift a finger. The patient gradually regains control of his body, and thanks House, who has gone to the patient's room to retrieve a recorder which he's been using to listen in on his team from under the patient's pillow.

Meanwhile, Wilson gets curious as to why House was in Middletown. At the end of the episode, Wilson finds out that House was there to see a psychiatrist, and confronts him on the issue. House reluctantly acknowledges Wilson's accusation, but says he is not going to continue any further sessions. The episode ends with Wilson predicting House will end up alone, and showing that House's vision blurs in a similar fashion to the "locked-in" patient as he looks towards Wilson.

Foreman also tells the patient that he bought his first girlfriend a silver necklace and she never wore it, so he never bought his girlfriends jewelry again, until he met Thirteen. He bought her a bracelet, but again, she doesn't appear to be wearing it. Later during the liver biopsy, Kutner asks Thirteen why she's not wearing her bracelet. Foreman says he didn't realize she was wearing it at all, and Thirteen questions why Kutner noticed but not Foreman.

== Medical aspects ==
Sequence of the diagnoses:

- Herpes, varicella, or CMV infection
- Stroke, cancer, or infection
- Tumor with paraneoplastic syndrome
- Marchiafava–Bignami disease
- Epstein-Barr virus, malaria, picornavirus or rotavirus
- Neurosyphilis
- Heavy metal poisoning
- Varicella or Behçet's disease
- Sclerosing cholangitis
- Leptospirosis

Sequence of symptoms and possible causes:

- Locked-In Syndrome
- Seizure in response to antiviral medication
- Alcohol use
- Loss of ability to blink after a brain biopsy
- Cadmium dust found in a work area
- Ulcerative keratitis
- Cardiac arrest
- Itchy foot
- Liver failure
- Rash developed as a result of exposure to the patient's urine
- Proximity to rats infected with Leptospirosis

Sequence of tests and treatments:

- Antivirals administered at the ER where the patient was found
- MRI
- Brain biopsy
- Chelation therapy
- Fluorescein dye
- Antibiotics

The final diagnosis was Leptospirosis, caught due to proximity to infected rats in the patient's work environment. Leptospirosis shut down the immune system during its incubation period of 2 to 4 weeks, which left his body defenseless temporarily.

Treatment for the final diagnosis was antibiotics and malaria inhibitors.

== Reception ==
AV Club's Zach Handlen gives this episode a B+. Large portions of the episode are shown from the locked in patient's perspective, and Handlen states, "Basically, what we have here is a typical ep, delivered in an atypical fashion."
