= Last Resort (House) =

- House episode
- Episode no.: Season 5 Episode 9
- Directed by: Katie Jacobs
- Story by: Matthew V. Lewis
- Teleplay by: Matthew V. Lewis; & Eli Attie
- Original air date: November 25, 2008

Guest appearances
- Wood Harris as SWAT Chief Tactical Officer Bowman; Tracy Vilar as Nurse Regina; Evan Peters as Oliver; Evan Jones as Bill; Marcus Chait as Mitch; Alex Sol as Larry; Sarah Thompson as Nikki; Natasha Gregson Wagner as Sandra; Željko Ivanek as Jason

Episode chronology
← Previous "Emancipation"	Next → "Let Them Eat Cake"
- House season 5

"Last Resort" is the ninth episode of the fifth season of House and the ninety-fifth episode overall. It aired on Fox on November 25, 2008. This episode is an "extended episode" as it runs for an extra seven minutes (excluding ads), taking the total episode's length without ads to 50 minutes.

== Plot ==
A gun-wielding man named Jason takes House, Thirteen, a nurse, and several patients hostage in Cuddy's office. The man claims to be sick with a long undiagnosed illness and demands medical attention from the best doctor in the hospital. With a room full of already sick patients, House must use them as guinea pigs to assure the hostage-taker that the medications he is administering to him are legitimate.

As Cuddy and the rest of House's team communicate with House over the phone to run tests and offer possible diagnoses, they ponder the possibility that everyone in Cuddy's office could wind up dead. With one hostage already shot, Thirteen wagers her own already diminished health as she simultaneously receives the experimental treatments the hostage-taker patient is receiving as he wants to make sure they are not sedatives.

At one point, House gets the gun in order to do a CT scan, but gives it back afterwards in order to continue the standoff and the search. After receiving medicine for Cushing's syndrome, Thirteen develops kidney failure. This gives House a clue as Jason's kidneys are not failing and the team realizes that some of the drugs he had previously been given must be protecting his kidneys.

Next the team believes that it is melioidosis, but Jason's medical history says he has not been to tropical climates. When pressed, he says he's never traveled farther south than Florida. House calls him an idiot, as Florida's climate does in fact qualify as a tropical one, and sends for a drug to treat the disease. Jason sends House out in exchange for the drug and demands that Thirteen take the injection first. Thirteen's suicidally reckless behavior comes to a head as she is faced with taking a drug that certainly will kill her due to her kidney failure. She breaks down, pleading that she doesn't want to die, and at the last second, Jason grabs the syringe and injects himself as the SWAT team blows the wall down and storms the room.

Outside, as Jason is arrested, House signals him to take a deep breath and let it out, and as he is able to do it, the diagnosis of melioidosis is confirmed. After nearly dying, Thirteen asks Foreman to admit her into a clinical trial for a potential Huntington's treatment, after having turned down his offer to get her in at the beginning of the episode.

At the end of the episode, Cuddy is looking around at her destroyed office when House enters. They argue over who is to blame, him for being so obsessed with solving the case that he gave the man back the gun, or her for doing everything he told her.

== Music ==
This episode featured the song "Between The Lines" (feat. Bajka) by British musician, producer and DJ, Bonobo, "Herzog" by Chris Clark, as well as "Glue of the World" by Four Tet, "It's Not The Same" by Yppah and "A Chronicle of Early Failures Pt. One" by The Dead Texan.

== Reception ==
James Chamberlin from IGN writes "House has always let his selfish curiosity over-take rationale judgment." He also wrote that there was very little humor.

== See also ==
- Chvostek sign
