= Dr. Chopper =

- The DVD cover for Dr. Chopper.
- Directed by: Lewis Schoenbrun
- Written by: Ian Holt
- Produced by: Mark Headley; Miranda Kwok; Tanya York
- Starring: Ed Brigadier; Chelsey Crisp; Costas Mandylor
- Cinematography: Andrew Parke
- Edited by: Lewis Schoenbrun
- Distributed by: York Entertainment
- Release date: August 2, 2005
- Running time: 86 minutes
- Country: United States
- Language: English

Dr. Chopper is a 2005 American horror film directed by Lewis Schoenbrun. The plot centers on five young friends who, while heading for vacation at a family cabin, encounter a notorious motorcycle-riding serial killer Dr. Fielding (Ed Brigadier) and his two cannibalistic female assistants, who murder and dismember people in search of body parts which Dr. Chopper uses as replacements for his own in order to extend his life.

== Cast ==
- Ed Brigadier as Dr. Fielding / Dr. Chopper
- Chelsey Crisp as Jessica
- Costas Mandylor as Terrell
- Robert Adamson as Nick
- Chase Hoyt as Reese
- Ashley McCarthy as Tamara
- Benjamin Keepers as Robert
- Elisa Schuyler as Melanie
- Rose Swim as Leslie
- Thomas Carlton as Detective Tubman

== Reception ==
The film received very negative reviews.

The film does have some form of a cultish fanbase, internet film critic Danny Price for Icons of Fright cites it as one of his favourite B-Movies of all time in the Schlock Value column of Icons of Fright, his comments are made in the columns debut edition in December 2007. Matt McAllister of Total Sci-Fi gave it 2/10 and called it an "Inept slasher with little to offer even the least discerning horror fan."
