= Crystal Bernard =

American singer-songwriter and actress (b. 1961)

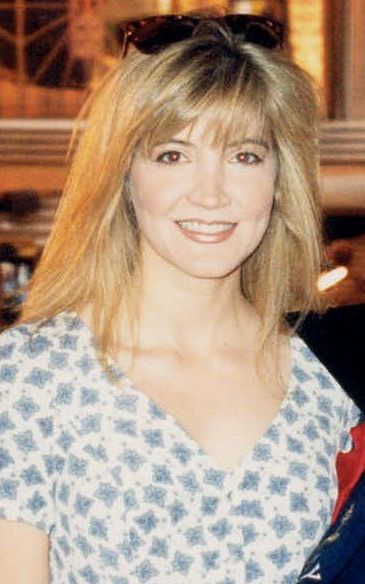
- Bernard at the 1994 Emmy rehearsal
- Born: Crystal Lynn Bernard; September 30, 1961 (age 64); Garland, Texas, US
- Occupations: Singer-songwriter, actress
- Years active: 1982–2008

Crystal Lynn Bernard (born September 30, 1961) is a retired American singer-songwriter and actress, best known for her roles as Helen Chappel-Hackett on the sitcom Wings (1990–1997), Amy on It's a Living (1985–1989), and K.C. Cunningham on Happy Days (1983–1984).

== Early life ==
Born in Garland, Texas, to televangelist Jerry Wayne Bernard and teacher Gaylon Fussell. Bernard became an entertainer at a young age, singing gospel songs with her older sister, Robyn, also an actress. One recording of the two that has survived from those years is a song called "The Monkey Song" on Feudin' Fussin' and Frettin', recorded when Crystal was eight years old. The recording is from a 1972 Thomas Road Baptist Church service led by Jerry Falwell. In addition to Robyn, she also has two younger sisters.

Bernard studied acting at Alley Theatre while growing up in Houston, Texas. She attended Spring High School and continued her education at Baylor University, studying acting and international relations, but not graduating.

== Career ==
=== Television ===
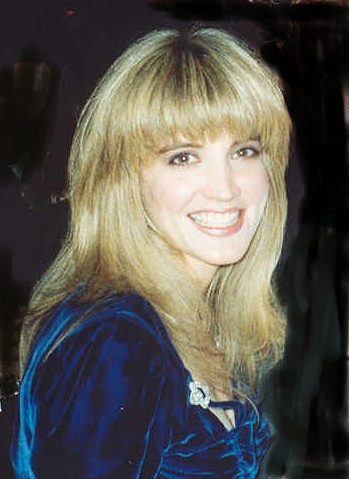
Bernard at the 1991 Emmy Awards

Bernard got her start in prime time television on the sitcom Happy Days, playing K.C. Cunningham during season 10 (1982–83). Then, after various guest appearances on other series, she joined the cast of the resurrected, syndicated version of the sitcom It's a Living, playing waitress Amy Tompkins. In 1989, she starred in a television pilot, Chameleons, created by Glen A. Larson. She played Shelley, a self-proclaimed crazed heiress who discovers that her eccentric millionaire uncle Jason Carr has been murdered. She sets out on a quest to find the truth behind his murder.

She played strong-willed airport lunch counter operator and cellist Helen Chappel Hackett on the sitcom Wings for the series entire eight season duration (1990–97). In 1999, she starred in the television movie To Love, Honor and Betray opposite David Cubitt and James Brolin.

=== Film ===
Early in her film career, she appeared in Young Doctors in Love (1982), along with her Happy Days co-star Ted McGinley. She starred in Deborah Brock's Roger Corman-produced horror film Slumber Party Massacre 2 (1987). Later, her work included a role in the film Jackpot (2001) and starring roles in Welcome to Paradise (2007) and Grave Misconduct (2008), the latter of which being her final acting role before retirement. She also starred in two Hallmark Channel movies, Single Santa Seeks Mrs. Claus (2004) and its sequel, Meet the Santas (2005).

=== Theatre ===
Bernard has appeared in these stage productions since the end of Wings:

- 1999: a Los Angeles production of Crimes of the Heart
- 2001: a 1999 Marquis Theatre revival of Annie Get Your Gun wherein she was the last in a series of actresses to play Annie Oakley
- 2005: West Coast premiere of Barbra's Wedding, starring opposite Daniel Stern (who also wrote the play) at the Falcon Theatre in Burbank, California

=== Music ===
In addition to acting, Bernard has a music career as a singer-songwriter. Albums include The Girl Next Door (1996) and Don't Touch Me There (1999). The latter includes a gospel track she recorded with her father and one sung with country artist Billy Dean.

She co-wrote the song "If I Were Your Girl" with Rhett Lawrence, which appeared on Paula Abdul's album Head over Heels (1995). She also co-wrote the song "Come To Me" on the debut self titled album of Angie & Debbie Winans (1993).

Bernard sang a duet with Peter Cetera called "(I Wanna Take) Forever Tonight", released on Cetera's album One Clear Voice (1995). The single peaked at No. 22 on the Billboard Adult Contemporary chart and No. 86 on the Hot 100.

She sang a duet with Jim Messina called "Watching the River Run".

She appeared in the 1989 video for "Birdhouse in Your Soul" by They Might Be Giants.

== Filmography ==
Film
| Year | Title | Role | Notes |
|---|---|---|---|
| 1982 | Young Doctors in Love | Julie | |
| 1984 | Master Ninja II | Carrie Brown | |
| 1987 | Slumber Party Massacre II | Courtney Bates | |
| 1999 | Gideon | Jean MacLemore | |
| 2001 | Jackpot | Cheryl | |
| 2007 | Welcome to Paradise | Debbie Laramie | Christian drama film |
Television
| Year | Title | Role | Notes |
| 1982 | Gimme a Break! | Kelly | Episode: "Hot Muffins" |
| 1982–83 | Happy Days | K.C. Cunningham | 16 episodes |
| 1983 | Fantasy Island | Ally Miller | Episode: "The Devil Stick/Touch and Go" |
| 1983 | High School U.S.A. | Anne-Marie Conklin | Television film |
| 1983/85 | The Love Boat | Wendy 'Minerva' Pryor / Susie Epshaw | 2 episodes |
| 1984 | The Master | Carrie Brown | Episode: "State of the Union" |
| 1985–89 | It's a Living | Amy Tompkins | 93 episodes |
| 1989 | My Two Dads | Liz Schaefer | Episode: "The Courtship of Nicole's Fathers" |
| 1989 | Paradise | Laura Clark | Episode: "A Proper Stranger" |
| 1989 | Chameleons | Shelly | Television film |
| 1990 | Without Her Consent | Marty | Television film |
| 1990 | When Will I Be Loved? | Julie Weston | Television film |
| 1990–97 | Wings | Helen Chappel-Hackett | 172 episodes |
| 1992 | Lady Against the Odds | Dol Bonner | Television film |
| 1993 | Miracle Child | Lisa Porter | Television film |
| 1994 | Siringo | Kaitlin Mullane | Television film |
| 1995 | As Good as Dead | Susan Warfield | Television film |
| 1996 | Dying to Be Perfect: The Ellen Hart Peña Story | Ellen Hart Peña | Television film |
| 1997 | Just Shoot Me! | Herself | Episode 3 "Secretary's Day" |
| 1999 | The Secret Path | Marie Foley | Television film |
| 1999 | A Face to Kill For | Allison Bevens | Television film |
| 1999 | To Love, Honor and Betray | Melissa Brennan | Television film |
| 2003 | According to Jim | Lisa Christie | Episode: "The Ring" |
| 2004 | Single Santa Seeks Mrs. Claus | Beth Sawtelle | Hallmark Channel film |
| 2005 | Meet the Santas | Beth Sawtelle | Hallmark Channel film |
| 2008 | Grave Misconduct | Julia London | Television film |

== Discography ==
=== Albums ===
| Title | Album details | Peak chart positions | |
| Title | Album details | US Country | US Heat |
|---|---|---|---|
| Girl Next Door | Release date: October 29, 1996; Label: River North | 47 | 36 |
| Don't Touch Me There | Release date: February 2, 1999; Label: River North | — | — |
"—" denotes releases that did not chart

=== Singles ===
| Year | Single | Peak positions | | | Album |
| Year | Single | US Country | US AC | US | Album |
|---|---|---|---|---|---|
| 1995 | "(I Wanna Take) Forever Tonight" (with Peter Cetera) | — | 22 | 86 | One Clear Voice |
| 1996 | "Have We Forgotten What Love Is" | 56 | — | — | Girl Next Door |
| 1997 | "State of Mind" | 70 | — | — | Girl Next Door |
| 1997 | "You're Gonna Miss a Whole Lotta Love" | — | — | — | Girl Next Door |
| 1999 | "Don't Touch Me There" | — | 25 | — | Don't Touch Me There |
| 1999 | "Hey" | — | — | — | Don't Touch Me There |
"—" denotes releases that did not chart

=== Music videos ===
| Year | Video | Director |
|---|---|---|
| 1995 | "I Wanna Take Forever Tonight | |
| 1996 | "Watching the River Run"' with Jim Messina | |
| 1996 | "Have We Forgotten What Love Is" | Steven R. Monroe |
| 1997 | "State of Mind" | Steven R. Monroe |
| 1999 | "Hey" | Steven R. Monroe |
