= Robyn Bernard =

American actress (1959–2024)

- Born: May 26, 1959; Gladewater, Texas, U.S.
- Died: c. March 12, 2024 (aged 64); San Jacinto, California, U.S.
- Occupation: Actress
- Years active: 1981–2002
- Known for: Portraying Terry Brock on General Hospital
- Relatives: Crystal Bernard (sister)

Robyn Bernard (May 26, 1959 – c. March 12, 2024) was an American actress.

== Early life and career ==
Bernard was born on May 26, 1959, in Gladewater, Texas. She portrayed bit roles in Simon & Simon, Whiz Kids, and The Facts of Life. From 1984 to 1990, Bernard portrayed Terry Brock on General Hospital. Bernard's last credit was in Voices from the High School (2002). Bernard attended Spring High School where she was Homecoming Queen, and studied at Baylor University, but did not graduate. Her credits also includes Tour of Duty. She portrayed herself in The New Hollywood Squares, Hour Magazine, and Win, Lose or Draw.

== Personal life and death ==
Bernard was the elder sister of singer and actress Crystal Bernard.

Bernard was found dead in a field in San Jacinto, California, on March 12, 2024, at age 64. A representative of the Riverside County Sheriff's Department said that the investigation was ongoing, but there was no evidence of suspicious circumstances. Autopsy results showed Robyn died of acute alcohol intoxication.
