= The Amazing Bulk =

2012 film by Lewis Schoenbrun

- DVD cover
- Directed by: Lewis Schoenbrun
- Written by: Keith Schaffner
- Story by: Keith Schaffner; Jeremiah Campbell
- Produced by: Lewis Schoenbrun; David S. Sterling
- Starring: Jordan Lawson; Shevaun Kastl; Terence Lording; Juliette Angeli; Jed Rowen; Randal Malone
- Cinematography: Dennis Devine
- Edited by: Lewis Schoenbrun; Brinda Demeterio
- Music by: Mark Dunnett
- Production company: Laybl Productions
- Distributed by: Wild Eye Releasing
- Release date: April 17, 2012
- Running time: 76 minutes
- Country: United States
- Language: English
- Budget: $14,000

The Amazing Bulk is a 2012 American independent direct-to-video superhero parody film directed and co-produced by Lewis Schoenbrun, starring Jordan Lawson, Shevaun Kastl, Terence Lording, Juliette Angeli, Jed Rowen and Randal Malone. It is a parody of the 2008 film The Incredible Hulk. The plot follows a research scientist who injects himself with an experimental serum, which inadvertently results in him gaining the ability to transform into a giant, purple-skinned humanoid monster whenever he gets angry.

Produced by Laybl Productions and released on April 17, 2012, by Wild Eye Releasing, it garnered notoriety due to its settings and visuals consisting of almost entirely reused stock imagery, graphics, and video purchased from various websites. Shunning the convention that film productions should feature original music, The Amazing Bulk takes numerous works of classical music for its soundtrack, including pieces by Richard Strauss, Johann Strauss II, Pyotr Tchaikovsky and others.

On April 5, 2021, an ebook titled The Return of the Amazing Bulk was published on Amazon Prime by Atom Mudman Bezecny, serving as a sequel to it as it follows Howard as he seeks a cure to return to his normal self while also having to battle a supervillainess named Pam Demic.

== Plot ==
Government research scientist Henry "Hank" Howard has been commissioned by General Darwin to develop a serum that will enhance the user's strength and longevity. Howard wishes to marry Darwin's daughter Hannah, but Darwin sternly refuses to give him his blessing until he gets results from the serum test. He goes on a date with Hannah to a carnival. They then take the subway, wherein a mugger approaches them at gunpoint and steals Howard's wallet and the ring he plans to propose to Hannah with. Howard attempts to fight the mugger, but is overpowered. Hannah expresses her concern for Howard's sudden bravery; to hide the intended proposal, Howard says that the mugger took a flash drive containing information about the serum.

Meanwhile, mad scientist Dr. Werner von Kantlove has been destroying famous monuments and landmarks and executing his own henchmen when they disagree with him. He reveals his plan to blow up the Moon using a Saturn V rocket to his dim-witted wife.

Desperate to prove the serum's effectiveness, Howard injects himself with it, turning him into a giant purple humanoid, the Bulk. He kills the mugger and runs off as police arrive to the scene, and they notice purple blood on the ground. Detectives Ray Garton and Lisa Tuttle find Howard's wallet and return it to him the next day. Garton deduces that Howard is responsible for the mugger's death. They watch as Howard returns to the scene of the crime and transforms into the Bulk. The Bulk goes on a rampage throughout the city as the detectives pursue him. The Bulk sends cars flying through the air, with one of them landing on Tuttle and crushing her to death. Garton shoots at the Bulk, who grabs and destroys a news helicopter. The Bulk morphs back into Howard and is arrested by Garton.

Darwin visits Howard, injects him with a sedative, and takes him to a secret facility, where he performs some experiments on Howard to analyse the results of the serum. Darwin tells Howard that he will give him both permission to marry Hannah and an antidote if he agrees to take down Kantlove. Kantlove's rocket launches and its payload lands on the moon successfully. However, he finds that a monkey has hacked the lander. Being dropped at his castle via helicopter, Howard transforms into the Bulk and kills all of Kantlove's guards, his wife, and then Kantlove himself.

The Bulk turns back into Howard and calls Darwin, but Darwin reveals that the project was funded by Kantlove itself, who wanted to use the serum to cure his erectile dysfunction. After the government stopped funding it, and Howard proved the serum's potency, he decided that Kantlove was no longer needed and used Howard to eliminate him. Darwin declares his plan to use the serum to create a super-human soldier army and sends the military to execute Howard. Howard turns into the Bulk and a lengthy chase ends with a nuclear bomb being dropped on the Bulk. Hannah comes in and Darwin tells her that Howard died saving the world from Kantlove.

Hannah wakes up to discover Howard at her house, having survived the bombing. He proposes to her, and Hannah accepts. Howard tries to warn Hannah about Darwin's true nature, but she doesn't believe him. Darwin sees that Howard has survived, and the two break into a struggle and fall off a balcony to their seeming deaths. Hannah visits Howard's grave and leaves a rose there. A drunken Garton arrives at the grave. He begins to urinate on it, and the Bulk's fists strike his head.

== Cast ==
- Jordan Lawson as Henry "Hank" Howard / Bulk:
  A government research scientist who has been commissioned to develop a serum to increase strength and longevity. When Howard successfully creates the serum, he injects himself with it, causing him to transform into the Bulk, a giant purple humanoid, when angered.
- Shevaun Kastl as Hannah Darwin:
  Howard's girlfriend.
- Terence Lording as General Darwin:
  Hannah's father, who is against Howard marrying his daughter. He is the one who commissioned Howard to develop the serum.
- Randal Malone as Dr. Werner von Kantlove:
  A villain who has been destroying famous monuments with torpedoes from his castle.
- Juliette Angeli as Lolita Kantlove:
  Kantlove's wife.
- Jed Rowen as Detective Ray Garton:
  A detective who pursues Howard and the Bulk.
- Deirdre V. Lyons as Detective Lisa Tuttle:
  A detective working alongside Garton.

== Production ==
=== Development ===
Director Lewis Schoenbrun was researching stock computer-generated imagery for the production of a low-budget horror mockbuster of Spider-Man, starring a female protagonist. When discussing with a producer the idea of making a comic book film featuring large amounts of green screen, he instead decided to create a parody of the character the Hulk. Several characters have parallels with Marvel Comics characters associated with the Hulk mythos; Henry Howard with Bruce Banner, General Darwin with General Ross, and the Bulk with the Hulk.

=== Writing ===
The script was completed over a span of four months, while finding all the CGI elements, along with creating storyboards, occurred over the course of six months. All of its settings and transitions, as well as much of its imagery, are stock graphics and backgrounds taken from numerous websites, including eBay, Digital Juice, Inc., and TurboSquid.

=== Financing and filming ===
The project was financed by Schoenbrun himself. Principal photography, which cost $6,000, took place over a period of five days. The entire film was shot on a green screen stage in California. Audio mixing cost $3,000, Color correction cost $1,000, and another $4,000 went towards CGI, software, and its composer, among other elements. The score, composed by Mark Daniel Dunnett, also features classical music from composers like Beethoven, Strauss, Brahms, and Tchaikovsky, and including some slapstick comedy elements reminiscent of Looney Tunes, Betty Boop and MGM cartoons.

== Influences ==
As a fan of director Stanley Kubrick, Schoenbrun included numerous references to Kubrick's works throughout The Amazing Bulk, including a scene of satellites in space reminiscent of 2001: A Space Odyssey; furthermore, the names of the characters Dr. Werner von Kantlove and his assistant Lolita allude to the Kubrick films Dr. Strangelove and Lolita.

== Release ==
The Amazing Bulk was originally released on DVD on April 17, 2012, by Tomcat Films. It went out of print, but was subsequently rediscovered, repackaged, and released on DVD and digital platforms worldwide by independent label Wild Eye Releasing on May 19, 2015.

== Reception ==
A staff writer for the website Horror Society found it to be absurd and incomprehensible, saying that "the way the film was shot makes it utterly impossible to follow it the way a film should be followed." Film critic Rob Rector criticized the apparent laziness of the filmmakers, stating that it seems they "stumbled across a bunch of free clipart on the internet and decided to weave it together as a backdrop for the film". In a 2018 article, Screen Rant editor Joseph Walter described the film as "a mockbuster based on 2008's The Incredible Hulk".

Felix Vasquez Jr. of Cinema Crazed berated its effects and designs, remarking that the filmmakers may well have "whipped together a movie out of Windows 95 clip art, Microsoft Paint, an old HD camera someone owned, and a lot of green screens in under a week at the director's loft somewhere in California". James DePaolo of the website WickedChannel called it "The Room of superhero movies" and wrote that it "is quite possibly one of the best worst films ever made". Andrea Beach of Common Sense Media gave it one out of five stars, summarizing it thus: "Lowbrow, violent superhero spoof is just plain bad."

In response to the criticisms, director Schoenbrun has stated that The Amazing Bulk is supposed to belong in the same vein as films like Who Framed Roger Rabbit, and that most critics "just don't get the concept of live action people in a comic book world". He also responded to a video criticizing the movie made by YouTuber I Hate Everything, telling the creator "I welcome all comments good & bad!" and that his reviews "give independent films exposure which they so desperately need." I Hate Everything responded, thanking Schoenbrun for being a good sport.
