= Lewis Schoenbrun =

American filmmaker and editor (born 1958)

- Born: September 21, 1958 (age 68); Plainfield, New Jersey, U.S.
- Occupation: Filmmaker
- Years active: 1987–present

Lewis Andrew Schoenbrun (born September 21, 1958) is an American filmmaker and editor.

== Early life and career ==
Schoenbrun became a fan of director Stanley Kubrick at age nine, when he watched the film 2001: A Space Odyssey. At eleven years old, Schoenbrun shot short films with his father's super 8 film camera, and received his own camera from his parents at the age of thirteen. In the 1970s, during his time at a university, he worked at a PBS station in Atlanta, Georgia, and later spent a year working with Tela Moving Images, a production company in Springfield, Massachusetts. During his time with the production company, he used a Moviola to edit a documentary film about a trip to Kenya, Africa that he went on with a group of aspiring astronomers.

In the late 1980s, Schoenbrun acted as an assistant editor on the films Mystic Pizza and UHF. After directing several direct-to-video films in the 2000s, Schoenbrun and a producer wanted to make an adaptation of the comic book hero Spider-Man, starring a female protagonist. In the summer of 2010, having instead chosen to create a parody film of the character the Hulk, Schoenbrun financed and directed the film The Amazing Bulk in Los Angeles, California. He remained in Los Angeles to work on the film's post-production and to shoot the film Aliens vs. Avatars.

He currently teaches at the International Academy of Film and Television in Cebu, Philippines.

== Selected filmography ==
=== As director ===
- Dr. Chopper (2005)
- Slaughterhouse Phi: Death Sisters (2006)
- Queen Cobra (2007)
- Aliens vs. Avatars (2011)
- The Amazing Bulk (2012)

=== As editor ===
- Mystic Pizza (1988, as assistant editor)
- UHF (1989, as first assistant editor)
- The Mark of Dracula (1997)
- Children of the Living Dead (2001)
- Ghost Dog: A Detective Tail (2003)
- Tower of Blood (2005)
- Dr. Chopper (2005)
- Slaughterhouse Phi: Death Sisters (2006)
- Queen Cobra (2007)
- Aliens vs. Avatars (2011)
- The Amazing Bulk (2012)
