= Here Kitty =

- House episode
- Episode no.: Season 5 Episode 18
- Directed by: Juan J. Campanella
- Written by: Peter Blake
- Original air date: March 16, 2009

Guest appearances
- Judy Greer as Nurse Morgan West; Christopher Moynihan as Neil Zane

Episode chronology
← Previous "The Social Contract"	Next → "Locked In"
- House season 5

"Here Kitty" is the eighteenth episode of the fifth season of House. It aired on Fox on March 16, 2009. The episode guest stars Judy Greer as a care home nurse who panics that the home's cat cuddling with her is a bad omen implying she will soon die. Although she feigns an illness to gain admittance, hoping to be examined pre-emptively, an actual life-threatening condition soon surfaces.

== Plot ==
Episode starts with House building a Rube Goldberg machine while Cuddy interrupts him. Nursing-home worker Morgan fakes an illness to get House's attention after the home's pet cat, Debbie, sleeps next to her. It seems that the cat only visits people if they are about to die and does so with alarming accuracy (similar to real-life cat Oscar). While House dismisses Morgan as faking, he is intrigued by her theory on the kiss-of-death cat, and sets out to disprove it (by making a trial for the cat with 3 coma patients, one of them a firefighter that, later in the episode, dies). When Morgan falls seriously ill (and therefore, doesn't suffer from Münchausen syndrome), he and the team are forced to get to the bottom of both mysteries. Ruling out multiple illnesses, House observes Debbie sitting on his warm computer and determines the cat is attracted to warmth. This explains the "death visits", because of the heat coming from the warming blankets on the patients.

House diagnoses Morgan with a carcinoid tumor of the appendix, interrupting the brain surgery she was about to undergo at the time. After a brief discussion on her willingness to sacrifice all on a crazy suspicion, she remarks that William Miller, the preacher that House had compared her with previously, had many followers, but even after being proven wrong about the second coming again and again, his congregation went on to found the Seventh-day Adventist Church. House states that this was just because his followers were as deluded as the preacher. Morgan simply says, "Maybe he just gave them something to live for." House ponders her statement for an instant, says "Feel better," and leaves.

Meanwhile, Taub struggles with his finances and reconnects with an old high school friend at the clinic whose business successes present Taub with an entrepreneurial opportunity he had not previously considered. Taub decides to pursue this opportunity and tells House of his resignation. At first House refuses it, prompting Taub to ask why. House merely replies, "It avoids the whole thing where you panic, run back and grovel, and then I punish you and take you back." Taub leaves, and House calls after him to bring donuts when he comes back the next day. Preparing to invest all his money remaining after a previous financial crisis, Taub arrives for a meeting with his friend, only to be confronted by a sympathetic secretary 15 minutes later to say that the friend was arrested and was actually a con artist who only worked as a temp at the company. Shocked, he takes his money and leaves. Taub returns to the hospital with the box of doughnuts he was told to bring back when he returns as per House's prediction and sits resignedly at the table. Debbie the cat then appears on his table. In one of the dialogues House mimics a famous quote from Goldfinger: "No Mr. Bond, I expect you to die".

During the diagnoses of Morgan, House ridicules Kutner about his superstitious nature, and tests him with classics such as opening an umbrella indoors and walking under a ladder. House goes as far as to fake an illness. Towards the end of the episode, House sits down at his desk to build a toy car track similar to the one he was working on in the opening sequence, only to spring up upon realizing his chair is soaked with urine. House orders Kutner to pay for the dry cleaning and storms out, leading Thirteen to question why Kutner is still alive after a prank like that, and to marvel at the fact that he got the cat to urinate on the chair. As he walks out, Kutner replies, "Yeah. A cat." His ironic tone prompts Thirteen to realize that it was Kutner's own urine on House's chair much to Thirteen's own disgust.

== Music ==
- The song that plays at the beginning of the episode is "Stranglehold" by Ted Nugent. Also House mentions Ted Nugent's Cat Scratch Fever in one of the dialogues with Foreman.
- The song that plays at the end of the episode is "I'm Not Drowning" by Steve Winwood, from the album Nine Lives.
- "I Cain't Say No" - from the musical Oklahoma!.

== Reviews ==
The reviews for Here Kitty were generally mixed. Barbara Barnett of Blogcritics wrote that "there was much to enjoy" and that the episode was generally humorous and light-hearted, especially House childishly teasing Kutner, but the "goading" of Taub was cruel and unnecessary. James Chamberlin of IGN gave the episode an overall "decent" rating of 7.3, but butchered it by describing it as "another poor House vs. God episode". Among other things, he stated the disappointment in House's rationalization of the cat's behavior, but praised the House-Kutner pranks, as well as Taub's scam story.
