= Children of the Living Dead =

2001 film by Tor Ramsey

- U.S. DVD Cover
- Directed by: Tor Ramsey
- Written by: Karen Lee Wolf
- Produced by: Karen Lee Wolf
- Starring: Tom Savini; Marty Schiff; Damien Luvara; Jamie McCoy; Sam Nicotero
- Cinematography: Bill Hinzman
- Edited by: Lewis Schoenbrun; Tom Dubensky
- Music by: Alan Howarth
- Distributed by: Artisan Entertainment
- Release date: October 9, 2001
- Running time: 90 minutes
- Country: United States
- Language: English
- Budget: $500,000

Children of the Living Dead is a 2001 American zombie film written and produced by Karen Lee Wolf, directed by Tor Ramsey and executive produced by John A. Russo. Russo had previously developed a colorized version of Night of the Living Dead (1968) for the film's 30th anniversary and would add additional scenes to it. Children of the Living Dead was made as a sequel to this version of the film. It was released direct-to-video on October 9, 2001.

Children of the Living Dead was shot in Pittsburgh and Ohio. Director Tor Ramsey said that production was difficult, with Russo and producer and screenwriter Karen Wolf having him hire many of their friends as crew members. Both Russo, and actor make-up artist Tom Savini have later spoken negatively about the film.

== Plot ==
Serial killer and serial rapist Abbott Hayes disappears from the morgue and becomes the leader of several waves of zombies that attack his home town. Fourteen years after the last zombie attack, a businessman relocates bodies from a local cemetery to pave the way for progress, but sets in motion Abbott's next undead assault.

== Cast ==
- Marty Schiff as Deputy Randolph
- Damien Luvara as Matthew Michaels
- Jamie McCoy as Laurie Danesi
- Sam Nicotero as Dusty
- Tom Savini as Deputy Hughes
- Heidi Hinzman as Candy Danesi
- Philip Bower as Joseph Michaels
- Tom Stoviak as Gregg Peters
- A. Barrett Worland as Abbott Hayes
- Justin Krauss as Steve
- Macey Schiff as Young Laurie

== Production ==
Children of the Living Dead was produced by John Russo, who had released a colorized version of Night of the Living Dead for its 30th anniversary, which included additional scenes and was colorized. Children of the Living Dead was intended to be a sequel to the 30th anniversary version of the film. It was shot in Pittsburgh and Ohio with principal photography beginning on July 7, 2000, with a budget of $500,000. The screenplay in the film was written by the daughter of executive producer Joseph Wolf, Karen Lee Wolf who also produced the film. Make-up artist on the film Vincent Guastini described the head zombie in the film, Abbott Hayes, as "the Nosferatu of zombies" giving him long fingernails and glowing blue eyes. Along with acting in the film, Savini also coordinated the stunts.

Director Tor Ramsey felt the production was difficult, with producers Russo and Karen Wolf telling him to cast many of their friends as crew members rather than the people he originally had in mind. Russo stated that when he signed on to it, Joe Wolf was financing the film and stated that Wolf felt his screenplay for the film was great and that he had intentions to direct it. Russo stated that Wolf then came to him saying he wanted to do his daughter's script which Russo described as "horrible." Russo declared that he "wanted to resign every day but I couldn't because these people would've lost a summer's worth of work. We hoped for the best and hoped it’d get revised and instead it’s a piece of crap. I call it The Living Abomination of Children." In an interview with Tom Savini about his career, he referred to the film as "the biggest piece-of-shit movie ever made" and that his lines were dubbed. Savini echoed what Ramsey stating that the "producer on the show as an idiot. I think her father gave her that movie as a present, and she didn't know what the hell she was doing." and that "the film shouldn't even be on the shelves of video stores."

== Release ==
Children of the Living Dead was released directly to video on October 9, 2001, on VHS and DVD by Artisan.

== Reception ==
The film received negative reviews from critics. Contemporary reviews included, Pete Sankey of Rue Morgue stated the film had no "blood, no action, nothing impressive at all" and that the entire film was dubbed and "it seems as little effort as possible was made to get the sound in sync with the lip movements." Sankey concluded that the film was a "coma-inducing, incomprehensible mess." An unnamed reviewer in Fangoria opined that "It's hard to tell what the primary problem is here: the awful actors, the nickel-and-dime budget or the wretched, childish script; let's call it a three-way tie." The reviewer went on to state that Abbott Hayes "wears what looks like a store-bought Halloween mask and gloves". A retrospective review from Peter Dendle in The Zombie Movie Encyclopedia, Volume 2 had him declare the film as "Wretched and hopeless", finding the film "dismal, boring, and unnecessarily complicated, all at once."

Russo called it the worst film that he had worked on, and said that he was often tempted to resign from the production. Savini has also been dismissive of the film; in an interview, he said that it was originally meant to be a serious horror film but turned out horrible.
