= Wallenda (film) =

2012 drama film

Wallenda is a 2012 drama film set in the 1920s focusing on high-wire patriarch Karl Wallenda's beginnings working in the circus.

== Plot ==
Youthful Wallenda (Marlon Wrede) does everything that it takes to be the best high-wire patriarch, but has moments of doubt and not feeling good enough. Later on in the story, he gains enough courage to take on his destiny of performing on the high-wire with the help of some friends.

== Cast ==
- Marlon Wrede as Karl Wallenda
- Clement von Franckenstein as Louis Weitzmann
- Sylvianne Chebance as Margareta
- Ed Brigadier as Theater Owner

== Production ==
VW Scheich directed and wrote this film with Uyen K. Le.

VW Scheich served as a producer for this film.

Wallenda predominantly used a green screen for its scenes.

During the post-production stage, over 300 CG artists, along with VW Scheich, created CG elements and backgrounds for the film. One of the 3D artists was Tyrone Evans Clark.

Gresham Lochner and Kevin Williams are the VFX post producers.

Shawn Hull was the Art Director and Ronnie Cleland was the Lead Texture Artist for this production.

The film was created by the production house named RareForm Pictures.

== Release ==
Wallenda had its world premiere on Friday, March 23, 2012, at the Cleveland International Film Festival.

The film was released to the public on November 17, 2016, on VOD / Digital release.

== Accolades ==
Wallenda is a winner of the Golden Crescent Award for best film at the 2012 Charleston International Film Festival.

It was officially selected for the 2012 San Antonio Film Festival.
