= Dominic Scott Kay =

American actor, director (born 1996)

- Born: 1995 or 1996 (age 30–31); Los Angeles, California, U.S.
- Occupations: Actor; director; entrepreneur; singer
- Years active: 2002–present

Dominic Scott Kay (born 1995 or 1996) is an American actor, director, entrepreneur, and singer.

== Career ==
Kay is best known for his work as the voice of Wilbur in Charlotte's Web, and in the post-credits scene of Pirates of the Caribbean: At World's End as Henry Turner, the son of Will Turner (Orlando Bloom) and Elizabeth Swann (Keira Knightley). Kay played Tom Cruise's son in Steven Spielberg's Minority Report, and Adam in Snow Buddies. He also appeared on season five of the American edition of The Voice.

Kay directed and wrote a short film starring Kevin Bacon called Saving Angelo, a story based on the true events of an abandoned dog left for dead on the side of the road which he and his family rescued in 2003. Kay wrote and directed another short film, Grandpa's Cabin.

== Personal life ==
Kay is an entrepreneur and owns multiple entertainment companies as well as an animal-lover and a StarPower Ambassador for Starlight Children's Foundation.

== Filmography ==
Film
Year	Film	Role	Notes
2002	Minority Report	Younger Sean Anderton	
2003	They Call Him Sasquatch	Boy	
2003	Mindcrime	Boy	
2004	Single Santa Seeks Mrs. Claus	Jake Sawtelle	Television film
2004	Guarding Eddy	Young Boy	
2004	Love's Enduring Promise	Mattie LaHaye	Television film
2004	Angel in the Family	Frankie	Television film
2005	Loverboy	Paul Stoll – Age 6	
2005	Fathers and Sons	Elliott – Age 4	Television film
2005	Meet the Santas	Jake Sawtelle	Television film
2006	Midnight Clear	Jacob	
2006	The Wild	Young Samson	Voice
2006	Charlotte's Web	Wilbur	Voice
2006	Air Buddies	Buddha	Voice
2007	Cake: A Wedding Story	Ryan	
2007	Charlotte's Web: Flacka's Pig Tales	Flacka	Voice
2007	The Dukes	Brion	
2007	Pirates of the Caribbean: At World's End	Henry Turner	Credited as "Young Will Turner"
2007	Saving Angelo	Danny	Also director and writer
2007	Grampa's Cabin	Jake	Also director and writer
2008	Snow Buddies	Adam Bilson	
2008	Front of the Class	Young Brad Cohen	
2011	The Little Engine That Could	Richard	Voice
2011	Cousin Sarah	Andrew	
Television
Year	Title	Role	Episode
2002	Power Rangers Wild Force	Scotty	Episode: "The End of the Power Rangers: Part 2"
2003	Oliver Beene	Young Oliver Beene	Episode: "A Day at the Beach"
2003	Oliver Beene	Young Oliver Beene	Episode: "Dancing Beene"
2004	Oliver Beene	Young Oliver Beene	Episode: "Disposa-Boy"
2004	Oliver Beene	Young Oliver Beene	Episode: "Fallout"
2006	Without a Trace	Eli	Episode: "Check Your Head"
2007	NCIS	Carson Taylor (born Carson Matthews)	Episode: "Lost and Found"
2008	Hallmark Hall of Fame	Young Brad Cohen	Episode: "Front of the Class"
2009	House M.D.	Jackson Smith	Episode: "The Softer Side"
Video games
Year	Title	Role	Note
2007	The Tuttles: Madcap Misadventures	Zach Tuttle	Voice

== Awards and nominations ==
Year	Award	Category	Film	Result
2003	Young Artist Award	Best Performance in a Feature Film – Young Actor Age Ten or Under	Minority Report	Nominated
2005	Young Artist Award	Best Performance in a TV Movie, Miniseries or Special – Leading Young Actor	Single Santa Seeks Mrs. Claus	Nominated
2007	Young Artist Award	Best Performance in a Short Film – Young Actor	Saving Angelo	Nominated
2007	Young Artist Award	Best Performance in a Voice-Over Role – Young Actor	Charlotte's Web	Won
2008	Young Artist Award	Best Performance in a TV Series – Guest Starring Young Actor	NCIS	Nominated
2008	Young Artist Award	Best Performance in a Short Film – Young Actor	Grandpa's Cabin	Nominated
2008	Jury Award	Best Short Film	Saving Angelo	Won
(Source: IMDb.com)
