= When Will I Be Loved? =

- VHS cover
- Genre: Drama
- Written by: Nancy Sackett
- Directed by: Michael Tuchner
- Starring: Stefanie Powers; Katherine Helmond; Crystal Bernard
- Music by: Brian Keane
- Country of origin: United States
- Original language: English

Production
- Executive producers: Winifred Gorlin; Gladys Nederlander
- Producer: Michael Tadross
- Production location: Atlanta, Georgia
- Cinematography: William Wages
- Editor: David Campling
- Running time: 95 minutes
- Production companies: Nederlander Television & Film Productions

Original release
- Network: NBC
- Release: December 3, 1990

When Will I Be Loved? is a 1990 television film directed by Michael Tuchner. The film focuses on three women of different backgrounds, portrayed by Stefanie Powers, Katherine Helmond, and Crystal Bernard, who help each other going through divorce.

== Plot ==
Maxie Howard (Stefanie Powers) is a high powered business woman who works in the fashion industry, as does her husband Jerry (Kevin Conway). They were once happily married, but when her fall collection of 1987 became a great success and Jerry's did not, their marriage became unstable, which was even worsened when Maxie walked into her husband in bed with another woman. A weekly visit to a counselor proves to be unsuccessful, which inspires Maxie to file for divorce with one of the best attorneys in New York, Martin Ransil (Josef Sommer).

Meanwhile, shy, dependent and insecure Barbara Patterson (Katherine Helmond) gave up her career as a school teacher to marry (Michael Tolan), who is never at home. When she is not occasionally working as a tour guide in a museum, she struggles with the lack of her husband's presence, and she starts to suspect that he has an affair. After he cancels another meeting with her, she Barbara decides that she has had enough and files for divorce at Ransil. When Eric is informed about this, he reveals that his mysterious behavior is due to the financial crisis of his company, which market holdings were hit hard on Black Monday, years earlier. Despite the financial troubles, Barbara is delighted that her husband is not committing adultery.

At another place in New York, young Julie Weston (Crystal Bernard) is a nurse, pregnant with her husband Ron Weston's baby. Ron (Christopher Meloni) has been coping with a gambling addiction for a while, and when she is informed that she can no longer pay rent because of her husband, she is fed up and visits Ransil as well. There, she walks into Maxie and Barbara, and the three women immediately become friends. Ron later promises to change his life, and convinces Julie to give him another chance. Maxie is unable to understand why Barbara and Julie are not proceeding with the divorce, and calls them naive for believing their husbands.

It soon turns out that Maxie's suspicion is not unnecessary, as Ron continues his gambling habits and Eric is having an affair with his secretary Mary Winters (Rebecca Wackler), and is the father of her illegitimate child. One night, Eric mysteriously leaves the house. Barbara follows him, and finds out about Mary and her baby. Humiliated, she turns to Maxie for comfort. Meanwhile, Julie makes a discovery as well, about Ron's continuing gambling problems. She leaves him, and accepts Barbara's offer to move in with her.

Refusing to be victims any longer, Maxie, Barbara and Julie give each other make-overs and start going out again. Barbara is encouraged to return to school and get her degree, in order to start the career that she longed for, for years. Eric longs for her to take him back, but she has become a strong woman since the divorce and rejects him. Maxie realizes that she has never been in love more with her husband since the divorce, and reconciles with him. With the help of Maxie and Barbara, Julie gives birth to a child. Ron oversees this and expresses his interest in saving his marriage. Julie, however, decides to stay a single parent until he is able to prove that he is a stable husband.

== Cast ==
- Stefanie Powers as Maxine "Maxie" Howard
- Katherine Helmond as Barbara Patterson
- Crystal Bernard as Julie Weston
- Michael Tolan as Eric Patterson
- Josef Sommer as Martin Ransil
- Christopher Meloni as Ron Weston
- Kevin Conway as Jerry Howard
- Rebecca Wackler as Mary Winters
- Renee DeLong and Lucille DeLong as Restaurant Patrons (extras)

== Production ==
Katherine Helmond had "a great deal of empathy" with the character that she portrayed, because she had seen women becoming the possession of their husbands in real life. Another reason why she liked the script, was that it dealt with three women who ordinarily would never interfere with each other, becoming friends.
