= Steve Guttenberg =

American actor, author, businessman, producer, and director (born 1958)

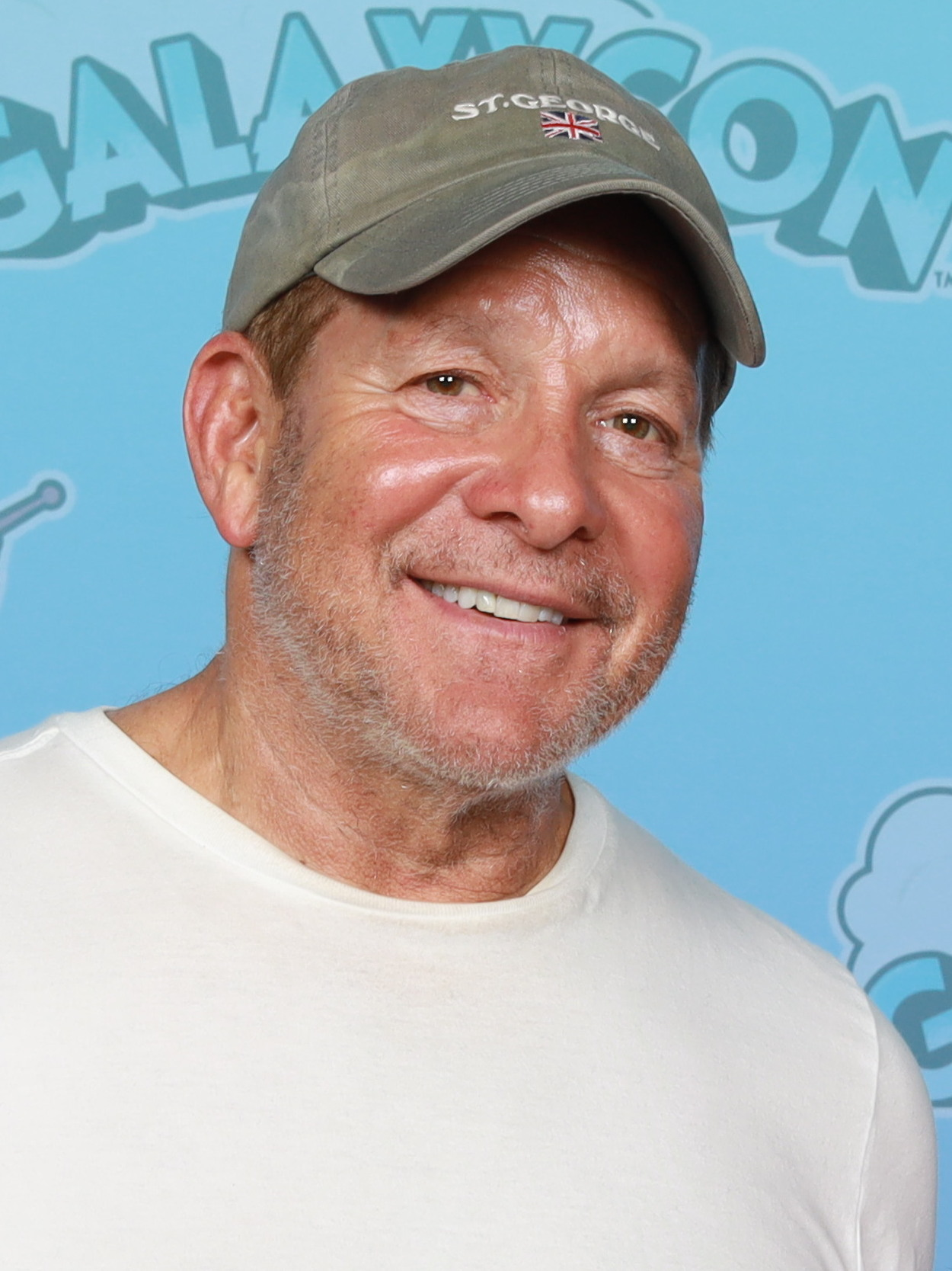
- Guttenberg at GalaxyCon Richmond in 2026
- Born: Steven Robert Guttenberg; August 24, 1958 (age 68); Brooklyn, New York City, U.S.
- Occupations: Actor; author; businessman; producer; director
- Years active: 1977–present
- Spouses: Denise Bixler (m. 1988; div. 1992) Emily Smith (m. 2019; div. 2025)

Steven Robert Guttenberg (born August 24, 1958) is an American actor, author, businessman, producer, and director. He is known for playing Carey Mahoney in the Police Academy films from 1984 to 1987 and for playing Michael Kellam in the box office hit Three Men and a Baby (1987) and its 1990 sequel. Guttenberg also acted in the feature films Diner (1982), Cocoon (1985), Short Circuit (1986), The Bedroom Window (1987), The Big Green (1995), and A Novel Romance (2011).

On television, he started his career in the CBS sitcom Billy (1979). He has had recurring guest roles as Woody Goodman in the teen mystery series Veronica Mars (2005–2006), Wayne Hastings, Jr. in the HBO dramedy series Ballers (2017), and Dr. Katman in the ABC sitcom The Goldbergs (2017–2023). He was a contestant during season 6 of the dance competition series Dancing with the Stars (2008).

== Early life and education ==
Guttenberg was born on August 24, 1958 in Brooklyn, New York City, and is Jewish. He is the only son (he has two sisters) of Ann Iris (née Newman), a surgical assistant, and Jerome Stanley Guttenberg, an electrical engineer. Stanley served in the Army's 82nd Airborne Division and was an Army Ranger. His godfather is actor Michael Bell. Steve had a Jewish upbringing in the Flushing neighborhood of the borough of Queens. In 1976, he graduated from Plainedge High School after his family moved from Queens to North Massapequa. While still in high school, Guttenberg attended a summer program at the Juilliard School and studied under John Houseman. During that time, he auditioned for and won a part in an off-Broadway production of The Lion in Winter.

After high school, Guttenberg attended the University at Albany, SUNY for a year. When he left SUNY, Guttenberg moved to California to pursue an acting career. His parents gave him $300 and said he had two weeks to find a job. Within two weeks, he was cast in a Kentucky Fried Chicken commercial playing opposite Colonel Sanders.

Guttenberg has said that he became observant after moving to Los Angeles, where he began attending synagogue on Friday evenings and Saturdays.

== Career ==
=== 1970s: Early roles ===
After playing an uncredited bit part in the suspense film Rollercoaster, Guttenberg had his first screen credit in the TV movie Something for Joey (1977). Next he played the starring role in the 1977 high school comedy The Chicken Chronicles, set in Beverly Hills in 1969. He played a significant role in the 1978 film The Boys from Brazil, based on the Ira Levin bestseller, and guest-starred on Family. Guttenberg starred in the short-lived TV series Billy (1979), based on Billy Liar.

=== 1980s–1990s: Career breakthrough with Police Academy and Three Men and a Baby ===
In 1980, a Coca-Cola commercial featured him trying to help a non-English-speaking woman fix a flat bicycle tire. He starred in the TV movie To Race the Wind (1980) playing blind lawyer Harold Krents, and in the same year, he starred in the Nancy Walker-directed Can't Stop the Music, a semi-autobiographical movie about the disco group Village People. Guttenberg played Jim Craig in the TV movie Miracle on Ice (1981). He appeared in Barry Levinson's Diner (1982) and starred in another short-lived TV series No Soap, Radio (1982). Guttenberg starred in the action-comedy The Man Who Wasn't There (1983) and had a supporting part in the post-apocalyptic television movie The Day After (1983).

In 1984, Guttenberg played the lead role in Police Academy. It grossed $8.5 million in its opening weekend and over $149 million worldwide, against a budget of $4.5 million; it is the most successful movie in the film franchise which it launched. He became a busy star over the next four years, appearing in nine starring roles, tying with Gene Hackman for busiest actor.In 1985, Police Academy was quickly followed by a sequel, Police Academy 2: Their First Assignment. That year, Guttenberg also played the romantic male lead in Ron Howard's Cocoon, which was also a commercial success.

In 1986, Guttenberg played Pecos Bill in an episode of Tall Tales & Legends, then was in Police Academy 3: Back in Training. Also in 1986, he starred in Short Circuit opposite Ally Sheedy, another very popular film. Guttenberg then made Police Academy 4: Citizens on Patrol, his last Police Academy Film, which was a commercial success, but was panned by film critics, holding a rare 0% on review aggregator Rotten Tomatoes.

Guttenberg had the biggest financial success of his career to date with Three Men and a Baby (1987), starring opposite Tom Selleck and Ted Danson. The film became the biggest American box office hit of 1987, surpassing Fatal Attraction, and eventually grossing $167 million in the United States and Canada, and $240 million worldwide. The film won the 1988 People's Choice Award for Favorite Comedy Motion Picture. Around this time, Guttenberg also starred in the thriller The Bedroom Window, directed by Curtis Hanson; he had a cameo in the science fiction film Amazon Women on the Moon; he supported Michael Caine and Sally Field in the comedy film Surrender; and he acted in a sequel to Cocoon titled Cocoon: The Return (1988), which was a commercial disappointment. In 1989, Guttenberg appeared in the Michael Jackson music video "Liberian Girl".

In 1990, he reunited with Selleck and Danson for Three Men and a Little Lady (1990). That year, he also replaced Timothy Hutton in the lead role of Prelude to a Kiss at the Helen Hayes Theatre on Broadway. He also performed in London's West End, where he starred in The Boys Next Door. He appeared in the world stage premiere production of Furthest From the Sun, which Woody Harrelson directed and co-authored. He directed "Love Off Limits" for CBS Schoolbreak Special in 1993. In 1995, he acted in The Big Green, and he was among the ensemble in Home for the Holidays, and starred in It Takes Two with Kirstie Alley and Mary-Kate and Ashley Olsen. In 1997, Guttenberg starred in Zeus and Roxanne, Casper: A Spirited Beginning and alongside Kirsten Dunst in Disney's Tower of Terror, based on the attraction at Disney World. In 1998, he acted in action films, Airborne and Overdrive, as well as the comedy Home Team.

=== 2000s–2020s: Continued work on screen and stage ===
His first film as director/producer/co-screenwriter/star was P.S. Your Cat Is Dead (2002), a film adaptation of a novel and Broadway play by James Kirkwood, Jr. Guttenberg starred in Mojave Phone Booth (2006) as Barry, and Making Change as Trafton. In Single Santa Seeks Mrs. Claus and then its sequel Meet the Santas, he played the starring role of Nick. He had a recurring role in the 2005–2006 season of the television series Veronica Mars as Woody Goodman, a wealthy businessman and community leader. He appeared as a lead in the NBC made-for-TV remake of The Poseidon Adventure (2005), playing Richard Clarke, a failing writer having an affair with a massage therapist. He guest-starred in a 2007 episode of Law & Order: Criminal Intent. He appeared in an According to Jim episode, "Two for the Money", in 2008. In the same year, Guttenberg released a video titled "Steve Guttenberg's Steak House" on Will Ferrell's Funny or Die website. Guttenberg joined the 2008 spring season dancing on Dancing with the Stars with professional dancer Anna Trebunskaya, and was eliminated third, on April 1.

A video which appeared to show Guttenberg jogging nearly naked through Central Park in New York City was released online in 2008. During an interview on the British talk show The Paul O'Grady Show, Guttenberg said that he made the video for Will Ferrell's Funny or Die website, but then decided to release it virally "as if it were real" as part of a challenge for the show. Guttenberg became the Guinness World Record Holder for preparing the most hot-dogs in one minute.

Guttenberg starred in the Cinderella pantomime at Churchill Theatre in Bromley (Greater London), playing the Baron (father of Cinderella) in 2008. Celebrating his involvement, the local Empire Cinema screened Police Academy on November 19. He introduced the film and answered questions.

Guttenberg played himself in a 2010 episode of the Starz comedy Party Down. He appeared on Broadway from late 2011 to early 2012 in Woody Allen's one-act play Honeymoon Hotel, which was part of the show Relatively Speaking. Guttenberg was on History Channel's 2015 miniseries Sons of Liberty playing Jack Bonner. In 2015, he was on SyFy Channel's Lavalantula and was featured in an episode of Community, "Intro to Recycled Cinema", which aired on Yahoo Screen. In 2020, he appeared on Holey Moley II: The Sequel. He also starred in the Lifetime film How to Murder Your Husband: The Nancy Brophy Story where he portrayed Daniel Brophy.

In 2025, Guttenberg starred in the Lifetime film Kidnapped by a Killer: The Heather Robinson Story in which he portrayed John Edward Robinson.

== Production company ==
Guttenberg's production company, Mr. Kirby Productions, is named after Gerald J. Kirby, his high-school drama teacher.

In 1995, Guttenberg was name-checked in The Simpsons episode "Homer the Great" in the song "We Do", whereby a fictional ancient secret society called the Stonecutters (a parody of the Freemasons) claim it was them that made Guttenberg a star. He was reportedly flattered by the reference.

== Personal life ==
=== Marriage and relationships ===
Guttenberg married model Denise Bixler on September 30, 1988. They separated in June 1991 and divorced in 1992. Guttenberg lived with WCBS-TV reporter Emily Smith starting in 2014. They were engaged on Christmas Day 2016 and married on January 19, 2019. The couple divorced in 2025.

=== Los Angeles wildfire rescue efforts ===
On January 8, 2025, Guttenberg was among the various citizens who have been volunteering their time helping first responders as devastating wildfires raged across the Los Angeles area of Southern California. Guttenberg even went unnoticed by the local media when interviewed. "This is the time for us to remember that we're part of a community" Guttenberg said and that people "have to help each other and be kind to each other. If you see somebody who needs help, help them. Ask them what they need." In an interview with CNN, Guttenberg said that he hadn't "seen anything like this in my entire life, and I don’t think many people have." Guttenberg also discussed helping to rescue pets belonging to a neighbor who happened to be out of town as the fires raged.

== Philanthropy ==
Guttenberg is involved with charities whose goal is to improve opportunities for the homeless and for young people. In 2016, a trust in his honor was established to provide support services to the homeless population of Los Angeles. The Entertainment Industry Foundation, Hollywood's charity arm, selected Guttenberg to be Ambassador for Children's Issues for his work on behalf of children and the homeless. At the 2016 New York Walk to Fight Lymphedema & Lymphatic Diseases in Brooklyn, Guttenberg announced, via a pre-recorded message, that he had joined the Lymphatic Education & Research Network's (LE&RN) Honorary Board.

== Acting credits and accolades ==
The sixth Fire Island Golden Wagon Film Festival held annually, honored Guttenberg with the 2008 Tony Randall Lifetime Achievement Award for his work in the entertainment industry, as well as his community service. The award was created in tribute to the first Golden Wagon honoree, Tony Randall; it is given to a member of the entertainment industry who embodies the same love of Fire Island, independent spirit, and community service which Randall shared.

Guttenberg received a star on the Hollywood Walk of Fame in 2011. In 2014, he received a key to the city from Miami Beach Mayor Philip Levine for his work with Fun Paw Care, raising awareness for animal rights.

== Bibliography ==
- The Guttenberg Bible – A memoir published in May 2012 by Thomas Dunne Books
- The Kids from D.I.S.C.O. (September 2014)
