= Oscar (therapy cat) =

Cat in Rhode Island

Oscar (c. 2005 – February 22, 2022) was a therapy cat who lived in the Steere House Nursing and Rehabilitation Center in Providence, Rhode Island, United States. He came to public attention in 2007 when he was featured in an article by geriatrician David Dosa in the New England Journal of Medicine. According to Dosa, Oscar appeared able to predict the impending death of terminally ill patients by choosing to nap next to them a few hours before they died. Hypotheses for this ability include that Oscar was picking up on the lack of movement in such patients or that he could smell biochemicals released by dying cells.

Oscar's abilities were also the subject of Dr. Dosa's 2010 book, Making Rounds with Oscar: The Extraordinary Gift of an Ordinary Cat. Oscar died at the age of 17, on February 22, 2022, accompanied by friends, after a brief illness.

== Background ==
Oscar was a therapy cat that was one of six cats adopted in 2005 by the Steere House Nursing and Rehabilitation Center in Providence, Rhode Island. Steere House, which bills itself as a "pet friendly" facility that allows a variety of pets to visit and reside there, is a 41-bed unit that treats people with end-stage Alzheimer's, Parkinson's disease and other illnesses, most of whom are generally unaware of their surroundings. Oscar was described as generally aloof and "not a cat that's friendly to people", sometimes, for example, hissing at people when he wanted to be left alone.

=== Death prediction ===
After Oscar had been at Steere House for around six months, staff noticed that Oscar often chose to nap next to resident patients who died within several hours of his arrival. It seemed to staff as if Oscar was trying to comfort and provide company to people as they died.

Joan Teno, a physician at Steere House, clarified that "it's not that the cat is consistently there first. But the cat always does manage to make an appearance, and it always seems to be in the last two hours."

After Oscar accurately predicted 25 deaths, staff started calling family members of residents as soon as they discovered him sleeping next to a patient in order to notify them and give them an opportunity to say goodbye before the impending death.

Oscar made international headlines in 2007 after the New England Journal of Medicine published an article about him by Steere House geriatrician Dr. David Dosa.

As of 2015, it was believed that Oscar accurately predicted 100 deaths.

=== Possible explanations ===
Teno and Dosa hypothesized that Oscar was responding to the smell of chemicals released when someone died or some other odor emitted during death.

CBS News consulted several animal specialists who had various hypotheses, such as that Oscar might have smelled some chemical that is released just before death and his attendance in rooms with that odor may have been a learned behavior, or that he was picking up on the stillness and lack of movement in the room rather than a smell.

Some have argued that Oscar did not have an ability to predict death, and that this was a case of confirmation bias.

== In popular culture ==
- A February 2009 installment of the comic strip Crankshaft depicted a cat named Barney who had this ability. He correctly foresees the death of character Lucy McKenzie.
- In 2009, the 18th episode in the 5th season of the TV show House, "Here Kitty", involved a cat that had predicted numerous deaths by curling up next to dying person's bedside.
- In 2010, a feature film was announced as being in development, based on Dosa's book.
- In 2010, Oscar was featured in episode 104 of Discovery Channel's show Weird or What?.
- In 2013, in Stephen King's Doctor Sleep, a sequel to The Shining, grown-up Dan Torrance is aided at a hospice by a prescient cat named Azzie, who can sense when people are about to die. King stated in an interview that Oscar served as an inspiration to the story.
- In 2014, the comedy film Just Before I Go features a cat seen curling up next to Greta's dying grandmother.
- Seattle-based punk rock band Tacocat wrote a song about him entitled "Oscar".
- In 2015, Oscar inspired a children's book, Oscar il gatto custode, written by Chiara Valentina Segré and illustrated by Paolo Domeniconi, published by the Italian publisher Camelozampa. The book was then published by Ragged Bears in the UK and by Gibbs-Smith in North America, with the title Oscar the guardian cat.
- In 2016, Season 27, Episode 13, "Love Is in the N2-O2-Ar-CO2-Ne-He-CH4", of The Simpsons, Homer visits his father Abe at the Springfield Retirement Castle where the residents are afraid of "the cat that can tell if you're dying". A scene includes a retiree in a walker in front of the home dropping dead on the sidewalk when the cat walks in front of him and screeches.

== See also ==
- Emotional support animal
- Fred the Undercover Kitty
- List of individual cats
