= Single Santa Seeks Mrs. Claus =

2004 American TV movie by Harvey Frost

- Written by: Pamela Wallace
- Directed by: Harvey Frost
- Starring: Steve Guttenberg; Crystal Bernard; Dominic Scott Kay
- Theme music composer: Mark Watters
- Country of origin: United States
- Original language: English

Production
- Producers: Brian Gordon; Erik Olson
- Cinematography: Dane Peterson
- Editor: Craig Bassett
- Running time: 96 minutes

Original release
- Release: 2004

Single Santa Seeks Mrs. Claus is a 2004 film starring Steve Guttenberg, Crystal Bernard and Dominic Scott Kay.

A sequel, Meet the Santas, was released in 2005.

== Plot ==
A single mother whose faith in love died with her former husband learns that Christmas miracles can still happen in director Harvey Frost's warmhearted tale of winter magic. Beth Sawtelle (Crystal Bernard) is a devoted single mother and advertising executive whose current campaign could put her on the fast track to the big time. The holiday season is here, and in order to sell the latest in video game technology, Beth's campaign needs the perfect Santa Claus. As Beth burns the midnight oil night after night and attempts to convince her young son Jake (Dominic Scott Kay) never to have faith in fantasies, the wistful young man pens a letter to Santa asking for a new dad for the holidays. It seems that up in the North Pole the time has come for Saint Nick to pass along the seasonal responsibilities to his son Nick (Steve Guttenberg), but in order to take the position, Nick must have a Mrs. Claus before Christmas Eve. Upon receiving the Christmas request from young Jake, Nick sets his sights on Los Angeles, and Beth Sawtelle in particular. Despite his best intentions, it's going to take more than a Christmas miracle to convince the dejected widow that love can still conquer all.

== Cast ==
- Steve Guttenberg - Nick Claus
- Crystal Bernard - Beth Sawtelle
- Dominic Scott Kay - Jake Sawtelle
- Armin Shimerman - Ernest
- Kristen Alderson - Savannah Sawtelle
- Wendy Braun - Amy
- Sebastian Tillinger - Hennesy
- Mackenzie Fitzgerald - Jocelyn
- Kelley Hazen - Joanie
- Cody Arens - Christian
- Robin Shorr - Meredith
- John Wheeler - Santa Claus
- Taffy Wallace - Coach
- Samantha Bennet - Marilyn
- Ashlynn Bernard - Young Beth Sawtelle
- Katia Coe - Holly
- Marcia Ann Burrs - Mrs. Claus
- Miranda Gibson - Emily
- Hanna Wilbur - Deaf Girl
- Austin Miles - Mail Santa
- Clement Von Franckenstein - Sir John
- Darby Stanchfield - Store Clerk
- Diane Robin - Woman Customer
- Erik Carr - Connor
- Alison McMillan - Mom of Deaf Girl
- Frank Sharp - Tree Seller
- Thomas Calabro - Andrew West

== See also ==
- List of Christmas films
- Santa Claus in film
