= Digital Juice, Inc. =

Former Royalty-free media company

- Company type: Private
- Industry: Royalty-free content
- Founded: Ocala, Florida (1992 as Dimension Technologies Media Group)
- Founder: David Hebel
- Defunct: January 2024

Digital Juice, Inc was an American company providing royalty-free content for professional video, print, and presentations. The company sold packaged content products direct to customers in CD-ROM, DVD-ROM and digital download formats. Founded in 1992, the company was originally based out of Ocala, Florida. Digital Juice had its office in Florida. Digital Juice also had various LLC-registered companies in New Mexico.

== History ==
The company was founded in 1992 by David Hebel under the name Dimension Technologies Media Group as a developer of third-party products for the Video Toaster. In 1995 the company released Club Toaster which was a monthly CD-ROM based product for the Amiga. The product contained animated backgrounds, still graphics, music, photos, articles, and product reviews. By 1997 Dimension Technologies was looking to move from developing for the Amiga and instead focus on Windows and Mac based content. The company renamed itself in 1997 to Digital Juice after the release of their first non-Amiga based product, Digital Juice for PowerPoint.

In February 2003, Digital Juice introduced their own online network called Digital Juice Television. Initially limited to simple product demos and trade show coverage, it expanded in early 2006 to include several new series involving tutorials and training videos.

In October 2007, Digital Juice finalized acquisition of The Ballistic Pixel Labs.

Due to the death of Hebel in November 2023, Digital Juice ceased operations in January 2024, along with its related brands.

== Awards and distinctions ==
In 2002, the company received the top award, out of 250 nominees, in the "New Business" category from the University of Tampa's John H Sykes School of Business.
