= Ed Brigadier =

American actor (1949–2012)

- Born: October 16, 1949; Cleveland, Ohio, U.S.
- Died: February 26, 2012 (aged 62); Los Angeles, California. U.S.
- Occupation: Actor
- Years active: 1992–2012

Ed Brigadier (October 16, 1949 – February 26, 2012) was an American actor immortalized as the gruesome motorcycle-riding title character in the cult slasher film, Dr. Chopper (2005). Brigadier made many other appearances in film and television on such shows as House, Nip/Tuck, Scrubs, Alias, How I Met Your Mother and Malcolm in the Middle. He appeared many times on The History Channel, most memorably as Philippe de Rigaud Vaudreuil in the miniseries The War That Made America - The Story of the French and Indian War, and acted on stage in such plays as The Imaginary Invalid, A Servant of Two Masters, and A Midsummer Night's Dream.

== Military work ==
In the 1980s, Brigadier spent time in Berlin, Germany working for the U.S. Army Recreation Services as a director for the community theater there. He performed in and directed Arsenic and Old Lace while there.

== Death ==
Brigadier died as a result of suicide.

== Filmography ==
=== Film ===
Year	Title	Role	Notes
1994	Tafelspitz	Mr. Larry Hitchcock	Credited as Edward Brigadier
2001	Mockingbird Don't Sing	Mr. Manning	
2002	Plugged In		Short Film
2004	Strange Fruit	Arnold West	Uncredited
2005	Dr. Chopper	Dr. Chopper	Direct-to-video
2006	The Oh in Ohio	Fridtjof Knudsen	
2007	Manband! the Movie	Old Man	
2007	The Wedding Video	Grandpa	
2007	Sister's Keeper	House Servant	
2007	The Jane Austen Book Club	Pastor	
2008	Haunted Echoes	Jay	Direct-to-video
2009	She Alien	Professor Timothy Wells	
2009	Alien Ecstasy	Professor Timothy Wells	
2009	Smile Pretty	Landlord	
2010	Anderson's Cross	Umpire	
2011	eCupid	Maitre 'D	
2012	Wallenda	Theatre Owner	Short Film; final film role

=== Television ===
Year	Title	Role	Notes
1992	Heimat 2: Chronicle of a Generation		Episode: "Die Zeit der vielen Worte"; credited as Edward Brigadier
1992	Terror Stalks the Class Reunion		TV movie; credited as Edward Brigadier
1993	The Last U-Boat	Staatssekretär Hobbes	TV movie; credited as Edward Brigadier
1996	Walker, Texas Ranger	Chaplain Carberry	Episode: "Break-In"
1996	Humanoids from the Deep	Doctor	TV movie
1997	Profiler	ICU Doctor	2 episodes
1999	Ally McBeal	Foreman	Episode: "Sex, Lies and Politics"
1999	7th Heaven	Chairperson	Episode: "We the People"
2002	Malcolm in the Middle	Man	Episode: "Forbidden Girlfriend"
2004	Alias	Reynard Kauffman	Episode: "Resurrection"
2004	Bet Your Life	Cashier	TV movie; uncredited
2004–2005	Gilmore Girls	Robert the Valet	4 episodes
2005	Scrubs	Barber	Episode: "My Boss's Free Haircut"
2005	Untold Stories of the E.R.	Reenactment	Episode: "Call the Code"
2005	Bitter Sweet	Mr. Barnett	TV movie
2006	The War That Made America	Governor General Vaudreil	TV documentary
2006	Nip/Tuck	Manager	Episode: "Willy Ward"
2007	Aliens Gone Wild	Professor Timothy Wells	TV movie
2007	Pushing Daisies	Minister	2 episodes
2008	Boston Legal	Foreman	Episode: "Mad About You"
2008	My Name Is Earl	Joe	Episode: "No Heads and a Duffle Bag"
2008	The Girl from Outer Space	Professor Wells	TV movie
2009	Star-ving	The Priest	Episode: "Starving... Literally"
2009	House	Richard	Episode: "Simple Explanation"
2010	Victorious	Maury	Episode: "The Birthweek Song"
2010	How I Met Your Mother	Waiter	Episode: "Robots vs. Wrestlers"
2010	Big Time Rush	Sebastian	Episode: "Big Time Concert"
2010	Jonas	German Speaking Tourist	Episode: "Band of Brothers"
2011	Pretend Time	Man in Court	Episode: "Show Me on the Doll"
