= Meet the Santas =

- Written by: Pamela Wallace
- Directed by: Harvey Jones
- Starring: Steve Guttenberg; Crystal Bernard; Dominic Scott Kay; Armin Shimerman; Mariette Hartley
- Theme music composer: Mark Watters
- Country of origin: United States
- Original language: English

Production
- Producers: Albert T. Dickerson III; Jeff Kloss
- Cinematography: James W. Wrenn
- Running time: 96 minutes
- Production company: Hallmark Entertainment

Original release
- Network: Hallmark Channel
- Release: December 17, 2005

Meet the Santas is an American television film starring Steve Guttenberg and Crystal Bernard. It premiered on Hallmark Channel in 2005. It is a sequel to 2004's Single Santa Seeks Mrs. Claus. As of 2010, it is shown in the 25 Days of Christmas programming block on ABC Family.

== Plot ==
Nicholas Claus (Steve Guttenberg) and Beth Sawtelle (Crystal Bernard) get ready to marry on Christmas Eve.

== Cast ==
- Steve Guttenberg as Nicholas Claus
- Crystal Bernard as Elizabeth "Beth" Sawtelle
- Dominic Scott Kay as Jake Sawtelle
- Armin Shimerman as Ernest
- Mariette Hartley as Joanna Hardcastle
- Parker McKenna Posey as Poppy Frost

== See also ==
- List of Christmas films
- Santa Claus in film
