= Zach Staenberg =

American film editor (b. 1954)

Zach Staenberg ACE
- Born: August 1951 (age 74); United States
- Occupations: Film editor; producer
- Years active: 1983–present
- Organization: American Cinema Editors

Zach S. Staenberg, A.C.E. (born August 1951) is an American film editor and producer, best known for his work on action films and the Matrix Trilogy. Staenberg won an Academy Award and two ACE Eddie Award for the editing of The Matrix (1999) and for HBO's Gotti (1996) for which he was also nominated for an Emmy. The Matrix films were written and directed by the Wachowskis, with whom Staenberg has had an extended collaboration dating from 1996. He also works with directors Andrew Niccol, Robert Harmon, and John Woo.

Staenberg has been elected to membership in the American Cinema Editors.

== Filmography ==
=== Feature films ===
Year	Title	Functioned as		Director	Notes
Year	Title	Editor	Other	Director	Notes
1981	The Chosen	Yes		Jeremy Kagan	Assistant editor
1981	The Woman Inside	Yes		Joseph Van Winkle	Assistant editor
1984	Police Academy	Yes		Hugh Wilson	
1984	Once Upon a Time in America	Yes		Sergio Leone	U.S. re-edited version
1985	Rustlers' Rhapsody	Yes		Hugh Wilson	
1987	Stripped to Kill	Yes		Katt Shea	With Bruce Stubblefield
1988	Blackout	Yes		Doug Adams	
1991	Eyes of an Angel	Yes		Robert Harmon	
1993	Nowhere to Run	Yes		Robert Harmon	
1996	Bound	Yes		The Wachowskis	
1998	Phoenix	Yes		Danny Cannon	
1999	The Matrix	Yes		The Wachowskis	
2001	Antitrust	Yes		Peter Howitt	
2003	The Matrix Reloaded	Yes		The Wachowskis	
2003	The Matrix Revolutions	Yes		The Wachowskis	
2005	Lord of War	Yes		Andrew Niccol	
2007	Mongol	Yes		Sergei Bodrov	
2008	Speed Racer	Yes		The Wachowskis	With Roger Barton
2008	City of Ember	Yes		Gil Kenan	
2010	Bunraku	Yes		Guy Moshe	
2011	In Time	Yes		Andrew Niccol	
2013	Ender's Game	Yes		Gavin Hood	With Lee Smith
2014	Good Kill	Yes		Andrew Niccol	
2015	Blackhat	Yes		Michael Mann	Additional editor
2017	Sand Castle	Yes		Fernando Coimbra	
2017	Once Upon a Time in Venice	Yes		Mark Cullen	
2018	Pacific Rim: Uprising	Yes		Steven S. DeKnight	
2020	Ava	Yes		Tate Taylor	
2021	American Night	Yes	Yes	Alessio Della Valle	Also co-producer
2023	Silent Night	Yes	Yes	John Woo	Also co-producer
2024	The Killer	Yes		John Woo	

=== Short films ===
Year	Title	Functioned as		Director	Notes
Year	Title	Editor	Other	Director	Notes
1983	China Lake	Yes	Yes	Robert Harmon	Also associate producer
1983	End of the Rainbow	Yes	Yes	Laszlo Papas	Also associate producer
2022	Glitch		Yes	Rebecca Berrih	Associate producer

=== Television ===
Year	Title	Functioned as		Director	Notes
Year	Title	Editor	Other	Director	Notes
1991	Great Performances	Yes	Yes	Luis Valdez	Episode: "La pastorela"; also associate producer
1991	Conagher	Yes		Reynaldo Villalobos	Television film
1994	The Cisco Kid	Yes		Luis Valdez	Television film
1996	Gotti	Yes		Robert Harmon	Television film
1997	Weapons of Mass Distraction	Yes		Stephen Surjik	Television film
2000	The Crossing	Yes		Robert Harmon	Television film

== Awards and nominations ==
Award	Year	Category	Work	Result
Academy Award	2000	Best Film Editing	The Matrix	Won
American Cinema Editors Award	1997	Best Edited Two-Hour Movie for Non-Commercial Television	Gotti	Won
American Cinema Editors Award	2000	Best Edited Feature Film – Dramatic	The Matrix	Won
British Academy Film Award	2000	Best Editing	The Matrix	Nominated
Primetime Emmy Award	1997	Outstanding Single-Camera Picture Editing for a Limited Series or Movie	Gotti	Nominated

In 2012, The Matrix was listed as the 25th best-edited film of all time in a 2012 survey of members of the Motion Picture Editors Guild.
