= Police Academy 4: Citizens on Patrol =

1987 film by Jim Drake

- Theatrical release poster by Drew Struzan
- Directed by: Jim Drake
- Written by: Gene Quintano
- Based on: Characters by: Neal Israel; Pat Proft
- Produced by: Paul Maslansky
- Starring: Steve Guttenberg; Bubba Smith; Michael Winslow; David Graf; Tim Kazurinsky; Sharon Stone; Marion Ramsey; Lance Kinsey; Leslie Easterbrook; Colleen Camp; G. W. Bailey; Bobcat Goldthwait; George Gaynes
- Cinematography: Robert Saad
- Edited by: David Rawlins
- Music by: Robert Folk
- Distributed by: Warner Bros.
- Release date: April 3, 1987
- Running time: 87 minutes
- Country: United States
- Language: English
- Budget: $17 million
- Box office: $76.8 million

Police Academy 4: Citizens on Patrol is a 1987 American comedy film. It is the fourth installment in the Police Academy franchise. It was released on April 3, 1987, and is the sequel to Police Academy 3: Back in Training (1986).

A group of Police Academy graduates are sent to train a group of newly recruited civilian officers. The original Police Academy cast reprise their roles in the film. Capt. Thaddeus Harris (G. W. Bailey), not seen since the first installment, returns as the film's nemesis. In Police Academy 2 and 3, Capt./Commandant Ernie Mauser (played by Art Metrano) filled that role, but Metrano asked to be replaced for the remainder of the series after filming the third film. This was the last Police Academy film to feature Steve Guttenberg as Carey Mahoney. This film also stars a young David Spade in his feature film debut, as well as featuring a brief appearance from pro skateboarder Tony Hawk as Spade's double in a skateboarding scene. The film was a commercial success, but was panned by film critics. It was followed by Police Academy 5: Assignment Miami Beach (1988).

== Plot ==
Commandant Eric Lassard decides the police force is overworked and understaffed, so he comes up with the idea of recruiting civilian volunteers to work side by side with his officers in a program called "Citizens On Patrol" (COP).

Carey Mahoney and his friends Moses Hightower, Larvell Jones, Eugene Tackleberry, Zed McGlunk, Carl Sweetchuck, Laverne Hooks, and Debbie Callahan are in charge of training the civilians. The civilians include the enormous Tommy "House" Conklin (who Hightower used to babysit), gung-ho senior citizen Lois Feldman, Tackleberry's own father-in-law Mr. Kirkland, and skateboarding delinquents Kyle Rumford and Arnie Lewis. The latter pair were caught by Captain Thaddeus Harris, and the judge was about to throw the book at them until Mahoney speaks to the judge to let Arnie and Kyle join the COP program as alternative punishment. The judge agrees, and the boys are joined by their attorney, Milt Butterworth.

Believing "the concept of citizens doing police work is asinine", Harris is determined to see the COP program fail and take over Lassard's job at the academy. When Lassard leaves on an overseas conference, Harris, and his right-hand man Lt. Carl Proctor, are put in charge of the academy and Harris immediately plots to make the COP volunteers quit and leave police work to officers.

The volunteers, however, do well in their training. Mrs. Feldman excels in firing Tackleberry's .44 Magnum, and they bond amicably (she reminds him of his mother). In training in water safety and drowning victim rescue, Zed rescues a cadet and gains a love interest, a reporter/photographer Laura, who has come to view Lassard's COP program and becomes attracted to Zed. Unfortunately, Harris ruins the moment, insulting them both and inspiring Zed to replace Harris' deodorant with mace, which burns his armpits. Despite pranks pulled on him during training, Harris is still determined to make the Citizens on Patrol program fail.

Jones learns that volunteers House, Kyle and Arnie feel ready to go out and arrest criminals, so he, Mahoney, Hightower, and Tackleberry prank the boys, locking them in a prisoner transport van with Hightower, who is posing as a Voodoo practitioner who reanimates Tackleberry's "dead" brother, as a Jason Voorhees-esque maniac with a chainsaw to make them take training more seriously. Later, after Harris yells at Zed again, calling him a disgrace, Laura comforts him, saying she thinks he is perfect.

After COP volunteers accidentally foil an undercover police sting, the program is suspended, much to Harris' delight. Mahoney believes he did it on purpose to shut down the COP program, paying him back by putting superglue on the mouthpiece of Harris' bullhorn, semi-permanently sticking the mouth guard to its rims. Sometime later, Harris gives some prominent citizens a tour of his precinct when Proctor is tricked into releasing every inmate at the precinct 19 jail, including a team of ninjas and Zack. After the criminals imprison Harris and his guests, they escape into the street, only to run into Mrs. Feldman, who immediately informs the Lassard academy.

When Lassard's officers hear of the jailbreak, COP volunteers are dispatched with the regular officers to catch the escaped felons. Sergeant Tackleberry foils a robbery with the help of Mrs Feldman. Lieutenant Debbie Callahan and Nogata, her patrol partner, who is romantically involved with her, are driving around the harbour when they spot a hijacking in progress, so they go aboard the ship. Suddenly, a gang of hiding ninjas emerge, but Larvelle Jones also appears out of nowhere. Although the bad guys outnumber several times over, the three highly trained officers give all dangerous fugitives a good beating. After a balloon chase, they eventually manage to recapture all the criminals. Meanwhile, House, Kyle, Arnie, and Butterworth save Harris and Proctor from drowning in the river after their attempt (and failure) to participate in the chase, and Zed impresses his girlfriend Laura by saving Sweetchuck's life after they both fall out of a plane in mid-air. Several of the police chiefs who witness Lassard's program in action congratulate and compliment him on the program and his officers, much to Harris' dismay.

== Cast ==
=== Staff at The Academy ===
- Steve Guttenberg as Sergeant Carey Mahoney
- Bubba Smith as Sergeant Moses Hightower
- Michael Winslow as Sergeant Larvell Jones
- David Graf as Sergeant Eugene Tackleberry
- Tim Kazurinsky as Officer Carl Sweetchuck
- Leslie Easterbrook as Lieutenant Debbie Callahan
- Marion Ramsey as Sergeant Laverne Hooks
- George Gaynes as Commandant Eric Lassard
- George R. Robertson as Commissioner Henry Hurst
- Bobcat Goldthwait as Officer Zed McGlunk
- G. W. Bailey as Captain Thaddeus Harris
- Lance Kinsey as Lieutenant Carl Proctor
- Brian Tochi as Officer Tomoko "Elvis" Nogata
- Colleen Camp as Sergeant Kathleen Kirkland-Tackleberry
- Andrew Paris as Officer Bud Kirkland

=== C.O.P. Program ===
- Derek McGrath as Milt Butterworth
- Scott Thomson as Sergeant Chad Copeland
- Billie Bird as Mrs. Lois Feldman
- David Spade as Kyle Rumford
- Brian Backer as Arnie Lewis
- Tab Thacker as Tommy "House" Conklin
- Corinne Bohrer as Laura

=== Others ===
- Sharon Stone as Claire Mattson
- Randall "Tex" Cobb as Zack
- Michael McManus as Todd
- Arthur Batanides as Mr. Kirkland
- Jackie Joseph as Mrs. Kirkland
- Jack Creley as Judge
- Kay Hawtrey as Poetess
- TJ Scott as Bank Robber
- Paul Maslansky as Retirement Home Warden
- Ed Hsing as Ninja
- Mark Kubota as Ninja
- Wilson Khoa as Ninja
- Harold Kojima as Ninja
- Glenn Kwann as Ninja
- Brian Sakamoto as Ninja
- James Wong as Ninja
- Jean Frenette as Ninja
- Wayne Chabrol as Ninja
- Cameo appearances by skateboarders Steve Caballero, Chris Miller, Tommy Guerrero, Lance Mountain, Mike McGill, and Tony Hawk.

== Music ==
Motown Records issued a soundtrack album on record and cassette; until 2013, this was the only film of the series to have a soundtrack album released.

1. "Rock the House" - Darryl Duncan (5:29)
2. "It's Time to Move" - S.O.S. Band (3:19)
3. "Dancin' Up a Storm" - Stacy Lattisaw (3:29)
4. "Let's Go to Heaven in My Car" - Brian Wilson (3:30)
5. "The High Flyers (Police Academy Theme - Montage)" - Robert Folk (2:04)
6. "Citizens on Patrol" - Michael Winslow and the L.A. Dream Team (4:16)
7. "Rescue Me" - Family Dream (4:54)
8. "I Like My Body" - Chico DeBarge (3:56)
9. "Winning Streak" - Garry Glenn (3:12)
10. "Shoot for the Top" - Southern Pacific (2:46)

== Reception ==
=== Box office ===
The film debuted at number one in the United States weekend box office and would go on to gross a total of $28,061,343. It grossed $76,819,000 worldwide.

=== Critical response ===
On the review aggregator website Rotten Tomatoes, 0% of 19 critics' reviews are positive, with an average rating of 2.8/10. The website's consensus reads: "Utterly, completely, thoroughly and astonishingly unfunny, Police Academy 4: Citizens on Patrol sends a once-innocuous franchise plummeting to agonizing new depths." Metacritic, which uses a weighted average, assigned the film a score of 26 out of 100, based on 8 critics, indicating "generally unfavorable" reviews. Audiences polled by CinemaScore gave the film a grade B−.

Janet Maslin of The New York Times wrote: "The Police Academy series seems to shoot for an ever younger crowd. The optimum viewer for Police Academy 4: Citizens on Patrol would be a 10-year-old boy. Even better, it would be a whole pack of them. That's not to say the film isn't funny; it means only that the sense of humor being addressed is very specific. Stay away if drawing room farce is what you're after."

Kevin Thomas of the Los Angeles Times wrote: "What’s so amazing about the Police Academy movies is that they keep being made even though they stopped being funny after the hilarious original. We’re now up to No. 4, and the most you can say for it is that it is the teeniest bit better, not quite so crass as the last two. [...] There might have been some comic possibilities in this, but writer Gene Quintano strays widely from the premise to toss out, hit-and-miss fashion, a series of pranks involving much slapstick humor and culminating in some aerial tomfoolery involving hot-air balloons and a pair of ancient biplanes. Unfortunately, the film never takes flight itself."

The film was nominated for a Golden Raspberry Award for Worst Original Song for the song "Let's Go to Heaven in My Car" at the 8th Golden Raspberry Awards. It was the only film in the entire Police Academy film series to receive a Golden Raspberry Award nomination of any sort.

== Sequel ==
A sequel titled Police Academy 5: Assignment Miami Beach, was released in 1988.

== See also ==
- List of films with a 0% rating on Rotten Tomatoes
