= Rustlers' Rhapsody =

1985 film by Hugh Wilson

- Theatrical release poster
- Directed by: Hugh Wilson
- Written by: Hugh Wilson
- Produced by: David Giler; Walter Hill
- Starring: Tom Berenger; G. W. Bailey; Marilu Henner; Fernando Rey; Andy Griffith
- Cinematography: José Luis Alcaine
- Edited by: Zach Staenberg; Colin Wilson
- Music by: Steve Dorff
- Distributed by: Paramount Pictures
- Release date: May 10, 1985 (United States)
- Running time: 88 minutes
- Language: English
- Budget: $5.5 million
- Box office: $6,090,497

Rustlers' Rhapsody is a 1985 American comedy–Western film. It is a parody of many Western conventions, most visibly of the singing cowboy films that were prominent in the 1930s and the 1940s. The film was written and directed by Hugh Wilson, who was supposedly inspired by working at CBS Studio Center, the former Republic Pictures backlot. It stars Tom Berenger as a stereotypical good-guy cowboy, Rex O'Herlihan, who is drawn out of a black-and-white film and transferred into a more self-aware setting. Patrick Wayne, son of Western icon John Wayne, co-stars, along with Andy Griffith, Fernando Rey, G.W. Bailey, Marilu Henner and Sela Ward.

Henner was nominated for a Golden Raspberry Award for Worst Supporting Actress.

== Plot ==
The concept of the film is explained in a voiceover wondering what it would be like if one of the old Rex O'Herlihan films were to be made today. At that point, the scene shifts from black and white to color and the soundtrack changes from mono to surround sound.

As a consequence of this paradigm shift, Rex O'Herlihan, a "singing cowboy", is the only character aware of the plot outline. He explains that he "knows the future" inasmuch as "these Western towns are all the same" and that it's his "karma" to "ride into a town, help the good guys, who are usually poor for some reason, against the bad guys, who are usually rich for some reason, and ride out again." Rex's knowledge is also connected to the unspecified "root" vegetables he digs up and eats.

On his high-stepping horse Wildfire, Rex rides into the town of Oakwood Estates, walks into a saloon and meets Peter, the town drunk. In exchange for a free drink, Peter explains the background: the town, and especially the sheep herders ("nice enough, but they smell God-awful"), are being terrorized by the cattle ranchers, headed by Colonel Ticonderoga. Also there is Miss Tracy, the traditional 'prostitute with a heart of gold'. A local sheriff is "a corrupt old coward who takes his orders from the Colonel."

Blackie, the foreman at Rancho Ticonderoga, swaggers into the bar with two of his henchmen and shoots one of the sheepherders, then the town's real-estate agent. Miss Tracy objects, and when she is verbally abused by one of Blackie's henchmen, Rex intervenes. Blackie draws on Rex after he threatens to "shoot in the hand" anyone drawing on him – and duly delivers on that threat. The disabled Blackie orders his two henchmen Jim and Jud to kill Rex, but in firing hurriedly, they shoot Blackie in the back instead. Rex then shoots both in the hand and orders them to remove Blackie's corpse.

Peter exchanges his drunk suit for a sidekick outfit, catches up with Rex and is reluctantly accepted. (Rex has sworn off sidekicks as they keep dying.) At the singing cowboy's campsite, Peter finds not one but two women there eager to get to know Rex a little better, Miss Tracy and the Colonel's daughter Miss Ticonderoga.

The Colonel goes for help to the boss of the railroad men – who wear dusters. "We should stick together. Look what we have in common: we're both rich, we're both power-mad, and we're both Colonels — that's got to count for something!" But Rex outwits the Bad Guys because he knows their every move before they do. Then the Colonels import "Wrangler" Bob Barber, apparently another Good Guy. Bob discomposes Rex in their first meeting by attacking Rex's claim to be the "most good Good Guy" and pointing out that a Good Guy has to be "a confident heterosexual". "I thought it was just a heterosexual", Rex objects. "No, it's a confident heterosexual", responds Bob.

Rex backs down from the shootout. On his way out of town, while preparing to change roles to that of a sidekick, Rex explains to Peter that he rides into town, kisses the girls and rides out again. "That's all: I just kiss 'em. I mean, this is the 1880s. You gotta date and date and date and date and sometimes marry 'em before they…you know."

Bob reports that Rex is finished as a Good Guy. Nevertheless, the Colonels, over Bob's objection, arrange for Peter to be bushwhacked. This rouses Rex to round up the sheep herders and face down Bob and the rancher/railroad combine. Bob is revealed as not a Good Guy at all because, after all, he is a lawyer. Rex shoots him by finishing him off for good.

Colonel Ticonderoga makes the peace. He apologizes to Rex and throws a party at Rancho Ticonderoga, after which Rex and Peter (who survived because Rex had him wear a bulletproof vest) ride off together into the sunset.

== Cast ==
- Tom Berenger as Rex O'Herlihan
- G.W. Bailey as Peter
- Marilu Henner as Miss Tracy
- Andy Griffith as Colonel Ticonderoga
- Fernando Rey as Railroad Colonel
- Sela Ward as Miss Ticonderoga
- Brant von Hoffman as Jim
- Christopher Malcolm as Jud
- Jim Carter as Blackie
- Paul Maxwell as Sheepherder #1
- Manuel Pereiro as Sheepherder #2
- Margarita Calahorra as Sheepherder's Wife
- Billy J. Mitchell as Doctor
- John Orchard as Sheriff
- Emilio Linder as Saloon Sheepherder
- Alan Larson as Bartender
- Thomas Abbot as Saloon Owner
- Elmer Modlin as Real Estate Broker
- Patrick Wayne as Bob Barber
- Hugh Wilson as Complaining John

== Production ==
The film was a passion project of director Hugh Wilson, who grew up loving Westerns he would see at the Saturday afternoon matinee. He was able to make it after the success of Police Academy (1984). In the mid-1980s, there was a brief revival in the popularity of the Western, with the studios making films like Pale Rider, Lust in the Dust and Silverado (1985). In May 1984, it was announced Wilson would direct the film for Paramount.

"This isn't really a send up", said Wilson. "We're playing it very straight. We loved those old films and we really are trying to say something about them, like how can the hero keep changing his shirt?" Wilson wanted George Gaynes to play a lead role but the actor was unable to due to his role on Punky Brewster.

Shooting took place in Almería, Spain, in October 1984. The film used sets that had once been featured in Sergio Leone films. Patrick Wayne was hired to appear in the film mid-shoot after the producers were unhappy with the performance of another actor already cast in the part of Bob Barber. Wayne later described it as "probably the best acting I've done on film."

== Reception ==
=== Box office ===
The film was a box office disappointment.

=== Critical ===
Rustlers' Rhapsody received negative reviews from critics, with many saying it paled in comparison to Mel Brooks' Blazing Saddles. Writing in The New York Times, Vincent Canby thought Wilson had ignored the "genuinely funny" idea that Rex O'Herligan (Tom Berenger) might be caught in a time warp. The Los Angeles Times called it "a joy." The Chicago Tribune called it a parody film in search of a good joke.

On the review aggregator website Rotten Tomatoes, 15% of 13 critics' reviews are positive. Audiences polled by CinemaScore gave the film an average grade of "C+" on an A+ to F scale.

=== Awards ===
Marilu Henner was nominated for a Golden Raspberry Award for Worst Supporting Actress for her performances in this film and Perfect at the 6th Golden Raspberry Awards.

== Home media ==
Rustlers' Rhapsody was released on VHS cassette in by CIC Video. In 2025, Kino Lorber released the film on Blu-ray. The Blu-ray features an audio commentary with filmmaker Max Allan Collins and film historian Heath Holland. The Blu-ray also includes the original theatrical trailer.
