= Leslie Easterbrook =

American actress

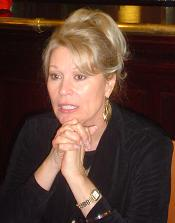
- Easterbrook in 2006
- Born: July 29, 1949 (age 77); Los Angeles
- Occupations: Actress; producer
- Years active: 1978–present
- Spouses: Victor Holchak (m. 1979; div. 1988) Dan Wilcox (died 2024)

Leslie Easterbrook (born July 29, 1949) is an American actress and producer. She played Sgt./Lt./Capt. Debbie Callahan in the Police Academy films and Rhonda Lee on the television series Laverne & Shirley.

== Early life ==
Leslie Easterbrook was born July 29, 1949 in Los Angeles. Her mother moved with her to Lincoln, Nebraska to live closer to her relatives, but soon after was institutionalized in an asylum. Easterbrook was adopted when she was nine months old by Carl Easterbrook, a music professor, and Helen Easterbrook, an English teacher at the University of Nebraska at Kearney, who raised her in Arcadia, Nebraska. She attended and graduated from Kearney High School and Stephens College.

== Career ==
Easterbrook appeared in about a dozen feature films and over 300 television episodes.

One of her earlier successes was in 1980 as Rhonda Lee beginning with season six of Laverne & Shirley. The role of Rhonda was part of the show's change of locale from Milwaukee to Burbank, California. While playing the role of Rhonda, she appeared as a panelist on Match Game taped on 27 September 1981.

Easterbrook performed as Debbie Callahan in the Police Academy film series. She told author Paul Stenning:

The funny thing is, that's not me at all. I'd never played tough. I'd played all kinds of things, but I'd never played someone who's intimidating or someone that was aggressive sexually. I was of a size that I never played the girl who got the guy. I wondered how I could do it. But I did. I went for the audition and I scared the producer and the director and then they backed up in their chairs and I went, "Oh no, now I really blew it. I scared them". So I left the audition upset. I didn't get to read the script until I got the part. I thought it was outrageous and so funny.

Easterbrook appeared in Private Resort, Murder, She Wrote, Diagnosis: Murder, Hangin' with Mr. Cooper, Baywatch, Matlock, Hunter, and The Dukes of Hazzard. In 2005, she replaced Karen Black as Mother Firefly in Rob Zombie's The Devil's Rejects, the sequel to the 2003 horror film, House of 1000 Corpses. In 2007, she played security guard Patty Frost in Rob Zombie's remake of Halloween. In 2008, she played Betty in the thriller/horror film House. In 2010, she starred in The Afflicted. She also appeared on Ryan's Hope as Devlin Kowalski. Her voice work has been featured in several projects, including Batman: The Animated Series and Superman: The Animated Series.

Easterbrook, an accomplished vocalist, sang the National Anthem at Super Bowl XVII which landed her starring roles in musicals on Broadway and throughout the country. In Police Academy: Mission to Moscow, she sings the Harry Akst-Grant Clarke jazz standard "Am I Blue?" atop the piano, parodying Michelle Pfeiffer's sequence from The Fabulous Baker Boys.

Easterbrook made a video, Real Beginner's Guide to the Shotgun Sports, the first in a series designed to "encourage and prepare non-shooters" for their first shooting experience. She serves on the board of the National Law Enforcement Officers Memorial Fund, and supports a number of children's charities. Easterbrook is a National Rifle Association member and has served on the board of directors of the California Rifle and Pistol Association.

== Personal life ==
Easterbrook was married to screenwriter Dan Wilcox until his death in 2024. She is good friends with former Police Academy cast member Scott Thomson and was close friends with Marion Ramsey. Easterbrook describes the cast of the original film as a "big family."

== Filmography ==
=== Film ===
Year	Title	Role	Notes
1980	Just Tell Me What You Want	Hospital Nurse	
1984	Police Academy	Sgt. Debbie Callahan	
1984	His & Hers	Sharon	
1985	Private Resort	Bobbie Sue	
1986	Police Academy 3: Back in Training	Lt. Debbie Callahan	
1987	Police Academy 4: Citizens on Patrol	Lt. Debbie Callahan	
1988	Police Academy 5: Assignment Miami Beach	Lt. Debbie Callahan	
1988	The Taking of Flight 847: The Uli Derickson Story	Audrey	Television film
1989	Police Academy 6: City Under Siege	Lt. Debbie Callahan	
1994	Police Academy: Mission to Moscow	Capt. Debbie Callahan	
1995	Mr. Payback: An Interactive Movie	Diane Wyatt	
1997	Two Small Voices	Patient #2	Television film
1998	The Hunted	Lynn the Manager	
2000	Big Wind on Campus	Science Teacher	
2001	The Song of the Lark	Jesse Darcy	Television film
2001	Maniacts	Matron Knull	
2002	The Moment After	Stephanie	Short film
2003	Dismembered	Helen	
2004	Tales of a Fly on the Wall	Bud's Mom	Television film
2005	Long Distance	Mrs. Freeman	
2005	Murder at the Presidio	Thelma "Bunny" Atkins	Television film
2005	The Biggest Fan	Police Woman	
2005	The Devil's Rejects	Mother Firefly	
2006	A Dead Calling	Marge	
2007	A Family Lost	Carol	Television film
2007	Cartel, 1882	Fame Longstreet	
2007	Halloween	Patty Frost	
2007	The Heartbreak Kid	Jodi's Mom	
2007	Retribution Road	Lana Gambol	
2008	House	Betty	
2009	Black Water Transit	Bet Tannen	
2010	Hollywood & Wine	Hattie Mcdaniel	
2011	The Afflicted	Maggie	
2011	Rift	Meagan Charms	
2011	Skeletons in the Closet	Eleanor	Short film
2012	Find Me	Linda	
2012	Sorority Party Massacre	Stella Fawnskin	
2013	Clubhouse	Patty Newman	
2013	Nevermind the Dawn	Rose	Short film
2013	Compound Fracture	Annabelle	
2013	A Little Christmas Business	Linda Collier	
2013	House of the Witchdoctor	Irene Van Hooten	
2014	The Wedding Pact	Donna	
2014	Number Runner	Babette Schiller	
2014	NightLights	Gina	
2015	Rivers 9	Martha	
2015	Lavalantula	Doris	Television film
2015	Daddy	Mrs. McCormack	
2015	Howl of a Good Time	Martha	Short film
2016	Terror Birds	Dr. Slater	
2016	Greater	Barbara Burlsworth	
2016	Sugar Skull Girls	Azreal	
2016	2 Lava 2 Lantula	Doris	Television film
2016	Of Flesh and Bone	Margaret	Short film
2017	Prisoner	Woman	Short film
2017	Charlotte	Martha	Segment: "Howl of a Good Time"
2017	The Neighborhood	Annabella	
2017	Dark Image	Phyllis Browne	
2017	Furious of Alabama	Paula Hargrove	
2018	Abnormal Attraction	Hildie "The Witch"	
2018	Intensive Care	Claire	
2018	A Christmas Arrangement	Dorothy Cromwell-Eastland	
2020	Voices	Samantha Eisner	
2020	Beast Mode	Zelda Zine	
2021	Body of the Mined	Morla	Short film
2021	The Baby Pact	Donna Carter	
2022	Give Till It Hurts	Veranda	

=== Television ===
Year	Title	Role	Notes
1980	Me and Maxx	Miss Arnold	Episode: "Dad's Day"
1980–1983	Laverne & Shirley	Rhonda Lee	Main role (season 6–8); 51 episodes
1981; 1983	The Love Boat	Wendy / Edie Franklin	2 episodes
1982	Fantasy Island	Michelle	Episode: "The Perfect Gentleman / Legend"
1982	The Devlin Connection	Nurse	Episode: "The Absolute Monarch of Ward C"
1983	Ace Crawford, Private Eye	Dee Dee Bozwell	Episode: "Bull Bates"
1983	Trapper John, M.D.	Louella	Episode: "The Final Cut"
1984	The Dukes of Hazzard	Madame Delilah	Episode: "The Fortune Tellers"
1984	Domestic Life	Kiki	Episode: "Cooking with Candy"
1984	Glitter	Teri Davis	Episode: "Trouble in Paradise"
1984	1st & Ten	Allison	Episode: "By the Bulls"
1985	Brothers	Professor Victoria Karper	Episode: "To Play or Not to Play"
1985	Misfits of Science	Strickland's Secretary	Episode: "Deep Freeze"
1986–1987	Ryan's Hope	Devlin Kowalski	Recurring role; 23 episodes
1988	Ohara	Gloria Collins	Episode: "X"
1988; 1991; 1995	Murder, She Wrote	Various characters	4 episodes
1989	It's a Living	Evelyn	Episode: "Matchmaker, Matchmaker"
1989	The Munsters Today	Neighbor	Episode: "Murder in Munsterland"
1990	Equal Justice	Charlene West	Episode: "The Art of the Possible"
1990; 1993	Matlock	Joanna Wilson	2 episodes
1991	Hunter	June Schwan	Episode: "Ex Marks the Spot"
1991	Baywatch	Dita	Episode: "Money, Honey"
1992	Hangin' with Mr. Cooper	Coach Judd	Episode: "Cheers"
1992	Batman: The Animated Series	Randa Duane (voice)	Episode: "Heart of Steel"
1993	Bodies of Evidence	Lily McCloud	Episode: "Eleven Grains of Sand"
1997	Superman: The Animated Series	Mala (voice)	Episode: "Blasts from the Past"
1997	Police Academy: The Series	Debbie Callahan	Episode: "Dead Man Talking"
1998	Diagnosis: Murder	Helen Frolick	Episode: "Food Fight"
2011	The Funny Man	Beatrice	Main role; 10 episodes Web series
2014	Mr. Wang Goes to Hollywood	Senator Wilson	Episode: "Science in the Hood"
2018	See Ya	Lana Turner	2 episodes
