= The History of the Typewriter Recited by Michael Winslow =

The History of the Typewriter recited by Michael Winslow is a 21-minute voice effect film by Michael Winslow. He partners with artist turned filmmaker Ignacio Uriarte in the short film about the history of the typewriter. The voice sound effects include the crank, creak and "return" of the 1898 Pittsburgh Visible; the "soft “choosh choosh” of the 1915 Faktotum Mod. 2;" and "the dark mechanical twang of the 1979 IBM Composer 82." An article on the New Yorker blog called the film a "thrilling journey" while decrying contemporary "machines" as being "characterless" and quiet. In the film, Winslow recreates the sounds of 32 different typewriters. Uriarte made the film, first by recording the sounds from 62 typewriters then having Winslow recreate a selection in their chronological order in history.

The film was exhibited as part of the Utah Museum of Contemporary Art's Cantastoria June 5 - September 15, 2012 exhibit as a "poetic and comical" example of the intimate interaction between humans and technology.
