= Marion Ramsey =

American actress (1947–2021)

- Ramsey as her character, Laverne Hooks, in the Police Academy franchise.

Background information
- Born: May 10, 1947; Philadelphia, Pennsylvania, U.S.
- Died: January 7, 2021 (aged 73) Los Angeles, California, U.S.
- Occupations: Actress; singer; songwriter
- Years active: 1975–2018

Marion Ramsey (May 10, 1947 – January 7, 2021) was an American actress and singer. She was a regular on the series Cos but is best known for her role as the soft-spoken Officer Laverne Hooks in the Police Academy series. Later she appeared in the films Recipe for Disaster and Return to Babylon, and in the television films for SyFy, such as Lavalantula and 2 Lava 2 Lantula!.

== Biography ==
=== Early life ===
Born in Philadelphia on May 10, 1947, Ramsey's entertainment career started on stage.

=== Career ===
She co-starred in Broadway shows, including productions of Eubie! and Grind, and toured the US in the musical Hello Dolly.

Her first television part was a guest role on the series The Jeffersons, and was a regular on Cos, the Bill Cosby sketch comedy series. In 1976, Her career in TV and film took off after she appeared as a guest on the hit sitcom The Jeffersons.

One of Ramsey's most memorable roles was that of Officer Laverne Hooks in the Police Academy films. She appeared as the character in the films: Police Academy (1984), Police Academy 2: Their First Assignment (1985), Police Academy 3: Back in Training (1986), Police Academy 4: Citizens on Patrol (1987), Police Academy 5: Assignment Miami Beach (1988), and Police Academy 6: City Under Siege (1989). Like most of her police academy co-stars, she did not return for the seventh and final film in the franchise, Police Academy: Mission to Moscow (1994). Ramsey lent her voice to the character Denise Pidgeon in the animated Police Academy series, which ran from 1988 to 1989. Ramsey was one of few main cast members of the series, to not guest appear in the sitcom, which aired from 1997 to 1998.

=== Later career ===
Later in her career, she had guest appearances on Adult Swim shows Robot Chicken and Tim and Eric Awesome Show, Great Job!. In 2015, she reunited with Police Academy stars Steve Guttenberg and Michael Winslow in the Syfy camp film Lavalantula and its sequel 2 Lava 2 Lantula! the following year. Her final acting role was in the 2018 indie film When I Sing.

Ramsey was a singer and songwriter who wrote songs with Haras Fyre (composer of "Supernatural Thing," "This Time I'll Be Sweeter," "Satan's Daughter" for Gary Glitter, and others).

Ramsey was deeply committed to AIDS awareness and lent her voice for charitable causes, performing in "Divas Simply Singing," an annual fundraising event.

Ramsey was good friends with actress and singer Nell Carter.

=== Death ===
She died at her Los Angeles home on January 7, 2021, after a short illness. She was survived by three of her brothers.

== Filmography ==
Film and television roles
Year	Title	Role	Notes	Refs
1975	Keep on Truckin'	Various	Regular role	
1976	The Jeffersons	Tracy Williams	Episode: "The Breakup: Part 2"	
1976	Cos	Various	Regular role	
1984	Police Academy	Cadet Laverne Hooks	On Police Academy: What an Institution! (UK: video title)	
1984	Family Secrets	Linda Jones		
1985	Police Academy 2: Their First Assignment	Officer Laverne Hooks		
1986	Police Academy 3: Back in Training	Sgt. Laverne Hooks		
1987	Police Academy 4: Citizens on Patrol	Sgt. Laverne Hooks	On Citizens on Patrol: Police Academy 4 (UK: poster title)	
1988	Police Academy 5: Assignment Miami Beach	Sgt. Laverne Hooks		
1989	Police Academy 6: City Under Siege	Sgt. Laverne Hooks		
1990	MacGyver	Police officer	Episode: "Harry's Will"	
1991	Beverly Hills, 90210	Careers Counsellor	Episode: "Stand (Up) and Deliver"	
1993	Johnny Bago	Nurse Roberta 'Bobbie' Thompson	Episode: "Hail the Conquering Marrow"	
1993	John Virgo: Playing for Laughs	Officer Hooks		
1993	Daddy Dearest	Cop No. 2		
1994	The Nanny	Woman in Audience	Episode: "The Strike"	
2001	Maniacts	Hooker		
2003	Recipe for Disaster	Motorcycle Cop	TV movie	
2006	Robot Chicken	Laverne Hooks / Teacher	Voice, Episode: "Sausage Fest"	
2007	Lord Help Us	Doretha Jackson		
2007	The Stolen Moments of September	Ms. Henshaw		
2009	Tim and Eric Awesome Show, Great Job!	Harriet	Episode: "Harriet"	
2011	Modern Family	Lady in salon	Episode: "Two Monkeys and a Panda"	
2012	Who Killed Soul Glow?			
2013	Return to Babylon	Barbara's Maid		
2014	Wal-Bob's	Lillian		
2015	Lavalantula	Teddie	TV movie	
2016	2 Lava 2 Lantula!	Teddie		
2016	DaZe Vol. Too (sic) – NonSeNse	Ms. Thenusda Norbuckle		
2017	Vendetta	Wilhelmina Thibodeaux		
2018	When I Sing	Reggie	(final film role)	
