= The Afflicted (film) =

- Film poster
- Directed by: Jason Stoddard
- Written by: Jason Stoddard
- Produced by: Leslie Easterbrook; Jason Stoddard
- Starring: Leslie Easterbrook; Kane Hodder
- Narrated by: Randi Jones
- Cinematography: Lee Dashiell
- Edited by: Robert Galloway
- Music by: Dege Legg
- Production company: Afflicted Picturehouse
- Distributed by: Nocturnal Features
- Release dates: 8 May 2011 (Dead by Dawn); 21 October 2011 (United States)
- Running time: 83 minutes
- Country: United States
- Language: English
- Box office: $212,940

The Afflicted (also known as Another American Crime) is a 2011 American horror thriller film written and directed by Jason Stoddard. A limited theatrical release, it is based on the crimes of Theresa Knorr, an American woman who killed her husband in 1964, and torture-murdered two of her children during the 1980s. It stars Leslie Easterbrook as Maggie, a mentally disturbed mother of four who begins abusing her children based on her own twisted interpretations of the Bible. Kane Hodder co-stars as Maggie's husband, Hank.

== Plot ==
Hours after his daughter Carla's sixteenth birthday, Hank attempts to run off in the middle of the night, but is caught by his mentally unstable wife, Maggie. The two argue and accuse each other of infidelity, and when Hank threatens to take their four children away from her, Maggie snaps and beats him to death with a baseball bat; after hiding his body, Maggie tells the rest of the family that Hank has absconded with his mistress. Maggie subsequently becomes a shut-in and descends into alcoholism and religious mania, spending most of her time obsessing over Pastor Jon Stackwell, an unscrupulous local televangelist nicknamed the "Cowboy Prophet."

Maggie begins abusing her children, and pulls them out of school when one of them, Cathy, tries to get help from the incredulous Principal Walsh. When they run out of money, Maggie coerces her son Bill into becoming a day laborer, and starts pimping Carla out to a man named Randy. Seeing herself as overweight and hideous, Maggie takes her frustrations over this out on Cathy, and one night forces her to eat canned foods blended with lard; when Cathy stands up to her, Maggie shoots her in the shoulder, and leaves her shackled in the bathtub after making an inept attempt at treating her wound.

When Cathy begs to be released, Maggie agrees to let her go, but only on the condition that she be allowed to remove the bullet from Cathy's shoulder. The "surgery" that Maggie performs on Cathy exacerbates the girl's injury, and she dies from the combination of it and the mixture of vodka and pills that Maggie had given her as an anesthetic. While Maggie is asleep and Bill is out disposing of Cathy's body, Carla tries to run away, and stumbles onto her father's remains. Maggie catches Carla, brings her home, and threatens her other children into bludgeoning their sister with a wooden paddle before locking her in a closet, where she is left to die.

After Carla's death, Maggie pimps her youngest daughter, Grace, out to Randy in her place, and orders Bill to dump and burn Carla's corpse. Carla's charred body is soon discovered by the police, and recognized by Pastor Jon, who races to Maggie's home. Grace, traumatized from being raped by Randy, shoots Maggie to death with her own gun, and then fatally stabs Bill, unaware that he had also been planning on killing Maggie. Pastor Jon arrives at the house, and tries to talk the suicidal Grace down, offering to take the blame for all of the murders, but Grace shoots herself anyway.

== Cast ==
- Leslie Easterbrook as Maggie
- Kane Hodder as Hank
- J.D. Hart as Pastor Jon Stackwell
- Michele Grey Hartsoe as Cathy
- Sims Holland as Carla
- Randi Jones as Grace
- Daniel Jones as Randy
- Cody Allen as Bill
- Constance Collins as Principal Walsh
- Ron Stafford as Detective Debose
- Anthony Garner as Detective McDonald
- Anthony Osment as Officer Williams
- Matthew M. Anderson as Officer Salinski
- Gezelle Flemming as Witness

== Release ==
The Afflicted was given a limited theatrical release on October 21, 2011 by Nocturnal Features, in association with Acort International and Midnight Releasing. On its opening weekend, the film grossed $90,272, and by November 11, 2011 had grossed $212,940. It was released on DVD on April 3, 2012 by Midnight Releasing.

== Reception ==
Leslie Easterbrook's performance was praised by Ain't It Cool News, which concluded its review of the film with, "The Afflicted is not for everyone, but stands out for its bold performances and its ability to burrow into the viewer's brainpan." Easterbrook's acting was also commended by Corey Danna of Horror News, who gave the "incredibly depressing" film a final score of 4/5 while opining that it explored "very real horror" in a way that was "more heart wrenching than exploitative." A grade of 1/4 was awarded by Arrow in the Head, which called the film "unwatchable" and "a complete mess" before ending its review of The Afflicted with, "I hate to be heavy-handed, but this is just a bad film. I have nothing good to say about it. The acting is histrionic, the characters lacking any depth or nuance, and the pacing very poor."

== See also ==
- An American Crime
- The Girl Next Door
