= Lavalantula =

American 2015 science fiction horror thriller film

- Promotional release poster
- Written by: Neil Elman; Mike Mendez; Ashley O'Neil
- Directed by: Mike Mendez
- Starring: Steve Guttenberg; Nia Peeples; Patrick Renna; Michael Winslow; Marion Ramsey; Leslie Easterbrook
- Music by: Chris Ridenhour
- Country of origin: United States
- Original language: English

Production
- Executive producers: Paul Hertzberg; Neil Elman
- Producers: Anthony Fankhauser; Lisa Hansen
- Cinematography: Richard J. Vialet
- Editors: Robert Días; Mike Mendez
- Running time: 83 minutes
- Production company: CineTel Films

Original release
- Network: Syfy
- Release: July 25, 2015

Related
- 2 Lava 2 Lantula! (2016)

Lavalantula is an American 2015 science fiction comedy horror thriller television film that is the first spin-off of, and the fourth overall installment of the Sharknado film series. Directed by Mike Mendez and starring Steve Guttenberg, Nia Peeples, Patrick Renna, and Ian Ziering (Note: Ziering reprises his role as Fin Shepard from the preceding film, Sharknado 3: Oh Hell No! (2015). His apperance in the film implies that Lavanlatula takes place concurrently with said film.), the film takes place after a series of volcanic eruptions in Los Angeles unleashes a swarm of gigantic, lava-breathing tarantulas from which the film draws its title.

Lavanlantula premiered on Syfy on July 25, 2015.

== Plot ==
A-list actor Colton West has an argument with Darren the film director, and storms off in his car. An earthquake hits, and Colton sees the Santa Monica Mountains erupt, spewing volcanic bombs all around him. A large fire-spitting spider comes out of the car in front of him. Colton runs and drives out of the traffic back onto the main road to escape.

Colton arrives home, and tells his wife Olivia about the giant spiders and that they need to leave. He takes a shotgun from his house and drives off in his car to find his son Wyatt, who had left the house under the guise of going to a soccer game.

In reality, Wyatt is out with his friends Jordan, Eli and Travis when they hear an explosion and see much smoke in the distance, and go to investigate. The teenagers find the source of the explosion to be a sink hole. Spiders come out of the hole spitting fire and start attacking people. Terrified, the teenagers flee to a warehouse, but Eli is caught by a spider and killed.

Colton's car is damaged when he hits a lava sinkhole. He gets out and finds a tour bus full of people further up the road. He tricks the driver and steals the bus. As he is driving, a spider jumps onto the bus. He brakes heavily and the spider falls off the front of the bus, after which he runs it over. The front of the tour bus starts dissolving because of the spider's blood being acidic. Colton stops the bus and evacuates it just before it blows up.

A spider comes down the chimney in Olivia's house but she shoots it. The army starts moving into the city, and they rescue Olivia from her house.

Colton gets a lift from his friend, Pirate Jack, a film stunt man. Jack's car gets a puncture after hitting a lava vein in the road. Spiders come out of sink holes and chase them into a museum. They meet a scientist in the museum, who is researching the spiders and the volcano. He works out that the spiders were buried in the magma millions of years ago. Because the spiders became active, they are causing the volcanic eruptions, and that the only way to stop them is to kill the Queen spider.

A spider gets in through a window in the warehouse where the teenagers are hiding and tries to attack them. Wyatt fights the spider with a fire extinguisher. Jordan, who was burnt earlier, has a fit and dies. Then loads of baby spiders crawl out of her as she catches fire. The baby spiders then attack Travis, setting him on fire and killing him. Wyatt runs to the roof of the warehouse where he gets a phone signal and texts his location to Colton.

The spiders attack the army truck Olivia is in, she hides under a fire blanket as they breathe fire inside the truck. The soldiers all get killed and Olivia kills the spider and drives off in the army truck to try and find Colton.

Meanwhile, the spiders break into the museum. Jack is killed, but Colton manages to escape. Olivia finds Colton and they drive off to rescue Wyatt.

Wyatt climbs off the roof of the warehouse, and is attacked by a spider. Olivia and Colton arrive and run over the spider with the Army truck. Colton realizes that liquid nitrogen can be used to fight the spiders. They all go to the special effects store, where Colton finds his colleagues from the film set.

Colton makes a plan to kill the queen spider with a liquid nitrogen bomb, made using items from the special effects store. He leaves with his film crew, to drop the bombs into the queen's underground chamber. They plant the bombs around the chamber and detonate them. Many spiders come out of sinkholes to the surface. The film crew shoots them all down. Then, the giant queen spider comes to the surface. Colton uses a jet pack from the film set and flies off a building towards the queen spider. He drops a nitrogen bomb into the spider's mouth, killing it and saving the city.

== Cast ==
- Steve Guttenberg as Colton West, a former A-List actor
- Nia Peeples as Olivia West, Colton West's wife
- Patrick Renna as Chris, a tourist
- Michael Winslow as Marty, part of the film crew
- Marion Ramsey as Teddie, part of the film crew
- Leslie Easterbrook as Doris, Olivia's friend
- Ralph Garman as Jack "Pirate Jack", an ex-film stunt man
- Danny Woodburn as Arni, Colton West's agent
- Noah Hunt as Wyatt West, Colton West's son
- Diana Hopper as Jordan, a friend of Wyatt
- Time Winters as Dr. Eric Von Struble, a scientist
- Ian Ziering as Fin Shepard, main character from Sharknado
- Zac Goodspeed as Travis, a friend of Wyatt
- Ben Snowden as Eli, a friend of Wyatt
- Felisha Cooper as Britney, Arni's assistant

== Sequel ==
A sequel to Lavalantula called 2 Lava 2 Lantula! premiered on Syfy on August 6, 2016. Some of the cast from the original film returned, including Steve Guttenberg, Marion Ramsey and Michael Winslow.
