= Beast Mode (film) =

- Directed by: Chris W. Freeman; Spain Willingham
- Written by: Drew Fortune; Chris W. Freeman; Spain Willingham
- Starring: C. Thomas Howell; Leslie Easterbrook; Ray Wise; James Hong; James Duval
- Release date: December 1, 2020
- Running time: 87 minutes
- Country: United States
- Language: English

Beast Mode is a 2020 American comedy horror film directed by Chris W. Freeman and Spain Willingham and starring C. Thomas Howell, Leslie Easterbrook, Ray Wise, James Hong and James Duval.

== Cast ==
- C. Thomas Howell as Breen Nash
- Leslie Easterbrook as Zelda Zine
- Ray Wise as Trammel Steadfast
- James Hong as Pish Rudabaker
- James Duval as Huckle Saxton
- Robert Costanzo as Chrome Mangle
- Douglas Bennett as Ezequiel
- Daz Crawford as Scram Putoff

== Release ==
The film was released on DVD and Digital on December 1, 2020.

== Reception ==
The film has a 63 percent rating on Rotten Tomatoes based on eight reviews.

Paul Grammatico of Dread Central awarded the film four stars out of five and wrote, "...an extreme b-movie feel which meshes well with its visual product. There are good moments of gory horror mixed with campy comedy..."

Lorry Kikta of Film Threat rated the film an 8 out of 10 and wrote, "If you love a good, silly horror-comedy with a heart of gold, this is right up your alley, and you should check it out."
