= Bernie Rhodenbarr =

Fictional character

- First appearance: Burglars Can't Be Choosers (1977)
- Last appearance: The Burglar Who Met Fredric Brown (2022)
- Created by: Lawrence Block

In-universe information
- Gender: Male
- Occupation: Bookstore owner, burglar
- Nationality: American

Bernie Rhodenbarr is the protagonist of the Burglar series of comic mystery novels by Lawrence Block. He first appeared in Burglars Can't Be Choosers, published in 1977; as of 2024, he has appeared in twelve novels by Block, as well as three short stories. H. R. F. Keating described him as "one of the most delectable characters of the day", and "inimitable", while The New York Times called him "the Heifetz of the picklock" and a "timeless (...) treasure".

== Characters ==
Bernie Rhodenbarr is a New York City-based thief who excels in lock picking and breaking and entering, and who is addicted to the thrill it provides. He served time in prison in his youth, and since then has resolved to avoid getting caught again.

Bernie's burglary operations are usually well-planned and tidily executed, from the initial surveillance of the target site to the escape route afterwards. However, during the course of some of these burglaries Bernie encounters a dead body, usually just before the police arrive to investigate a called-in murder. Thus begins the plotline of a typical Bernie Rhodenbarr novel, in which Bernie undertakes to solve the murder in order to clear his name.

Bernie's investigative techniques include not only interviewing the victim's associates, but visits (sometimes involving illegal entry) to their homes to identify (and occasionally plant) evidence.

Beginning with The Burglar Who Liked to Quote Kipling, Bernie has become the owner / operator of Barnegat Books, a used bookstore in Greenwich Village that he purchased from its retiring owner and partially funds through the take from his occasional burglary activities. Prior to the novel The Burglar Who Traded Ted Williams (to explain a publishing hiatus in the series) it was revealed that the bookstore was actually making a profit, before its building's landlord changed and the new owner raised the rent catastrophically. Bernie has since managed to buy the building, and now uses his burglary take to pay for the building's upkeep. The bookstore also houses a cat, a gift from Bernie's friend Carolyn, whom Bernie named Raffles after the fictional gentleman thief.

According to Lawrence Block, one of the reasons Bernie operates the bookstore was to meet girls. Bernie enjoys an active sex life, sleeping with at least one female character per novel. Bernie does not appear to have a steady girlfriend.

He has also developed a connoisseur's liking for Scotch whisky, particularly single malts. However, if he has a heist planned he will drink no alcohol in the hours prior to its execution, preferring Perrier instead.

== Friends and associates ==
Carolyn Kaiser is Bernie's best friend, occasional partner in crime, and lesbian soulmate. She operates a pet-grooming salon called The Poodle Factory near Bernie's bookstore. The two meet over drinks on a regular basis, discussing their work and love lives; their conversations enable writer Block to display his wit and mention favorite authors. Carolyn has a set of keys to Bernie's apartment and bookstore in case of an emergency.

Ray Kirschmann is a plainclothes detective on the New York police force, and is described by Bernie as "the best cop money can buy," since Ray will allow himself to be bribed to overlook Bernie's occasional illegal activities. However, Ray does draw the line at homicide, and is usually present at the climax of each novel when the murderer is finally revealed. A married, middle-aged man, Ray's appearance is normally rumpled (despite having expensive clothes) and he tends to talk in a less-educated manner than Bernie. He and Carolyn are not friendly.

Wally Hemphill is Bernie's lawyer. The two initially met as jogging enthusiasts when Bernie took up the activity, and Bernie called him to bail him out of prison when he'd learned his previous lawyer had died. Wally has helped Bernie by negotiating the sale of the Barnegat Books building to him, and has also taken up martial arts, which came in handy in a later novel when he apprehended an escaping suspect.

Marty Gilmartin is a wealthy businessman and theatre patron who met Bernie shortly after the latter attempted to burgle his home. He occasionally helps Bernie out by identifying potential victims for him, usually rich people with a cash flow problem who would like to collect on their home insurance policy by reporting a burglary, and, in fact, this is how the purchase of the Barnegat Books building was financed (detailed in The Burglar Who Traded Ted Williams).

== Series ==
=== Novels ===
1. Burglars Can't Be Choosers (1977)
2. The Burglar in the Closet (1978)
3. The Burglar Who Liked to Quote Kipling (1979)
4. The Burglar Who Studied Spinoza (1980)
5. The Burglar Who Painted Like Mondrian (1983)
6. The Burglar Who Traded Ted Williams (1994)
7. The Burglar Who Thought He Was Bogart (1995)
8. The Burglar in the Library (1997)
9. The Burglar in the Rye (1999)
10. The Burglar on the Prowl (2004)
11. The Burglar Who Counted the Spoons (2013)
12. The Burglar Who Met Fredric Brown (2022)

=== Short fiction ===
- "Like a Thief in the Night"
- "The Burglar Who Dropped In On Elvis"
- "The Burglar Who Smelled Smoke".

== In other media ==
The second novel in the series, The Burglar In The Closet, was made into the film Burglar, in which Bernie, formerly a white man, was renamed Bernice and portrayed by Whoopi Goldberg. Bruce Willis had originally been offered the role. Block was displeased by the adaptation, which he had seen as a inflight movie, without sound, without having recognizing it as based on his work until the end credits. Block has written the subsequent novels in such a way as to render them impossible to film. For a movie tie-in edition, Block added a short intro in which Bernie explains that he has a cousin named Bernice who is also a thief.

== Origins ==
In 1977, Block's writing career had stalled, and he began considering the possibility of committing actual burglaries. He then considered what would be the worst thing to happen if he committed breaking and entering: not just being caught by the police, but being caught by the police in the presence of a corpse. This idea formed the basis for the first series entry Burglars Can't Be Choosers. ""Rhodenbarr" is derived from a distant relative of Block, whose surname was Rosenberg. Block felt that "Rhodenbarr" sounded better.
