= Burglar (film) =

1987 film by Hugh Wilson

- Theatrical release poster
- Directed by: Hugh Wilson
- Screenplay by: Jeph Loeb (Note: Credited as "Joseph Loeb III."); Matthew Weisman; Hugh Wilson
- Based on: The Burglar in the Closet by Lawrence Block
- Produced by: Michael Hirsh; Kevin McCormick
- Starring: Whoopi Goldberg; Bob Goldthwait; G. W. Bailey; Lesley Ann Warren
- Cinematography: William A. Fraker
- Edited by: Fredric Steinkamp; William Steinkamp
- Music by: Sylvester Levay
- Production company: Nelvana Limited
- Distributed by: Warner Bros.
- Release date: March 20, 1987
- Running time: 103 minutes
- Countries: Canada; United States
- Language: English
- Budget: $12.5 million
- Box office: $16,357,355 (sub-total)

Burglar is a 1987 heist comedy film directed by Hugh Wilson and distributed by Warner Bros. The film stars Whoopi Goldberg and Bobcat Goldthwait. The title of the French-language release is La Pie voleuse.

== Plot ==
Bernice "Bernie" Rhodenbarr, a former San Francisco burglar, resumes her life of crime when a corrupt police officer named Ray Kirschman blackmails her.

A dentist, Dr. Cynthia Sheldrake, hires Bernice to break into her ex-husband Christopher's home and steal back her jewelry. Things take a turn for the worse when Christopher is murdered while Bernie is robbing his home, and thanks to Sheldrake and her lawyer Carson, Bernie is the only suspect.

To clear her name, Bernice and her friend Carl hop from bar to bar looking for someone who knew Christopher. They find out that Christopher had quite a few girlfriends and—to their surprise—boyfriends. Bernice has three new suspects after an old flame of Christopher's tells her about an artist, a bartender, and a mysterious man known only by his nickname: "Heeeeeeere's Johnny!"

Bernice investigates the artist and the bartender only to have them show up dead. With no clues or witnesses, Bernice waits for Dr. Sheldrake in her home to confront her. Demanding she tell her everything she knew about Christopher, she concludes that Cynthia herself had sex with her ex the night he was murdered.

During the conversation the TV flashes to an episode of The Tonight Show Starring Johnny Carson. Bernice realizes Carson knew the doctor's ex. Bernice calls Carson to meet her in the park with the bag of jewelry Bernice was commissioned to steal in the first place. Bernice has also deduced that Carson was in love with Christopher himself. A scuffle ensues and Bernice, along with her friend Carl and Ray, capture Carson.

== Cast ==
- Whoopi Goldberg as Bernice "Bernie" Rhodenbarr
- Bobcat Goldthwait as Carl Hefler
- G. W. Bailey as Ray Kirschman
- Lesley Ann Warren as Dr. Cynthia Sheldrake
- James Handy as Carson "Johnny" Verrill
- Anne De Salvo as Detective Todras
- John Goodman as Detective Nyswander
- Stephen Shellen as Christopher Marshall
- Elizabeth Ruscio as Frankie
- Vyto Ruginis as K.E. Graybow
- Larry Mintz as Vincent "Knobby" DiCarno
- Jo Anna March as Mrs. Kirschman
- Raye Birk as The Jogger
- Nathan Davis as Mr. Paggif, Pawnshop Owner
- Michael Nesmith as Cabbie
- Spike Sorrentino as Chief of Detectives
- Eric Poppick as Deliveryman
- Scott Lincoln as Man In Cadillac
- Thom Bray as Shoplifter In Bookstore
- Brett Marx as Dental Hygienist
- Gary Hershberger as Young Officer
- Mike Pniewski as Man In Grey Uniform #1
- Ethan Phillips as Barman (uncredited)

== Production ==
The film was adapted from the 1978 novel The Burglar in the Closet by Lawrence Block; in Block's book, Bernie Rhodenbarr is a white man living in New York. It was also the first R-rated and live-action production from the Canadian animation company Nelvana.

In a 2013 interview with Kevin Smith, screenwriter Jeph Loeb disclosed that Burglar was initially intended to be a serious vehicle for Bruce Willis with Whoopi Goldberg filling the role of the character's neighbor. (The film was based on the second of a long-running series of novels about a professional burglar, Bernard "Bernie" Rhodenbar.) When Willis dropped out, Goldberg took on the lead role.

== Reception ==
Critical reception was largely negative. Roger Ebert described the film as "a witless, hapless exercise in the wrong way to package Goldberg. This is a woman who is original. Who is talented. Who has a special relationship with the motion picture comedy. It is criminal to put her into brain-damaged, assembly-line thrillers." On Rotten Tomatoes, the film has an aggregate score of 27% based on 3 positive and 8 negative critic reviews.

== See also ==
- List of American films of 1987
- List of Nelvana franchises
