= Jimmy Wang =

Jimmy Wang may refer to:

- Jimmy Wang Yu (1943–2022), Taiwanese actor, director, producer, and scriptwriter
- Jimmy Wang (tennis) (born 1985), tennis player, who previously played under the name Wang Yeu-tzuoo

== See also ==
- James Wang (disambiguation)
- James Wong (disambiguation)
- Jimmy Wong (born 1987), American actor and musician
- Jimmy Wong (badminton), Malaysian badminton player
- James Yang (born 1981), wrestler who uses the ring name Jimmy Wang Yang
