= G. W. Bailey =

American actor (born 1944)

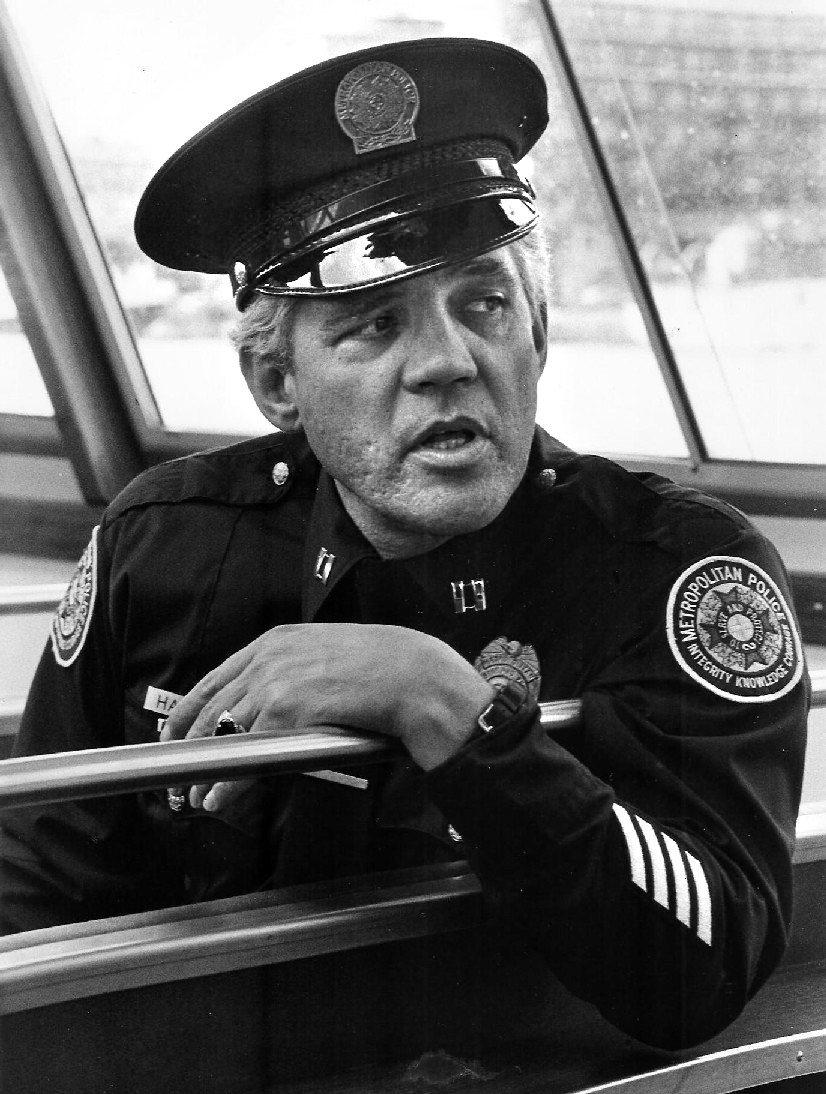
- Bailey as Captain Harris in Police Academy
- Born: August 27, 1944 (age 81); Port Arthur, Texas, U.S.
- Occupation: Actor
- Years active: 1974–present
- Spouse: Eleanor Jane Goosby (m. 1966; div. 1999)
- Children: 2

George William Bailey (born August 27, 1944) is an American actor. His roles include Staff Sergeant Luther Rizzo in M*A*S*H (TV series 1979–1983), Lieutenant/Captain Thaddeus Harris in the Police Academy films (1984–1994), and Captain Felix Maxwell in Mannequin (1987). He played Detective Lieutenant Louie Provenza on TNT's television crime drama The Closer and its spin-off series Major Crimes from 2005 to 2018.

== Life and career ==
Bailey was born in Port Arthur, Texas, where he went to Thomas Jefferson High School with Janis Joplin and Jimmy Johnson. He started college at Lamar University in nearby Beaumont and transferred to Texas Tech University in Lubbock.

Bailey left college and spent the mid-1960s working at local theater companies before moving to California in the mid-1970s. He broke into television with a small recurring role as a crime scene police officer on the short-lived detective show Harry O. He then landed one-shot episodic roles on television programs of the day such as Starsky and Hutch and Charlie's Angels. His film debut was in A Force of One (1979), an early Chuck Norris film. By the late 1970s, he got his breakout role as the conniving, cigar-chomping goldbricker Sgt. Luther Rizzo in M*A*S*H. He also appeared as Tom Berenger's sidekick in Rustler's Rhapsody (1985).

He returned to college in 1993, and graduated from Southwest Texas State University, now Texas State, in San Marcos, Texas in May 1993, with a Bachelor of Fine Arts, Theatre. For the 1999–2000 school year, he was the Artist-in-Residence.

In the late 1990s, he starred in three of the seventeen television films and miniseries in the Bible Collection series produced for the TNT television network: Solomon (1997), Jesus (1999), and Paul (2000).

From 2001 to 2019, Bailey served as the executive director of the Sunshine Kids Foundation, which provides trips and activities for hundreds of young cancer patients annually. He first volunteered with the organization after his goddaughter was diagnosed with leukemia.

== Filmography (Film and television) ==
- Charlie's Angels (1976, S1 E10: "Consenting Adults") - Mumford
- How The West Was Won (1977, S1 E2: "Erika") - Ivie
- CHiPs (1978, TV Series, S1 E14: "Rustling") - Drunk Driver
- Starsky & Hutch (1976–1978) - Hotel Clerk/Slade
- Soap (1978, TV Series) - The Hobo
- Laverne & Shirley (1979, S4 E23: "There's a Spy in My Beer") - Rocko
- A Force of One (1979) - Erwin
- Lou Grant (1979) - Water Man/Arlo Karp
- Happy Days (1979, S7 E9: "Joanie Busts Out") - Jack Whitman
- The French Atlantic Affair (1979, TV mini-series) - Jake (uncredited)
- Angie (1979, S2 E11: "Mary, Mary Marries")
- Benson (1979–1980) - Bartender/Gus
- Palmerstown, U.S.A. (1980, S1 E5: "The Black Travelers: II")
- Alcatraz: The Whole Shocking Story (1980, TV series) - Holfeld
- Flo (1980–1981) - Lonnie Castleberry/Bull
- Murder in Texas (1981, TV film) - Richard 'Racehorse' Haynes
- Bitter Harvest (1981, TV film) - Lazlo
- Fog (1981, TV film) - Mr. Carrion
- Hardcase (1981, TV film) - Paul Morgan
- The Capture of Grizzly Adams (1982, TV film) - Tom Quigley
- M*A*S*H (1979–1983, TV series) - Sergeant Luther Rizzo/The G.I.
- St. Elsewhere (1982–1983, TV series) - Dr. Hugh Beale
- Murder, She Wrote (1984) - Lt. Thibodeau
- Simon & Simon (1984) - Police Chief Don Potter/Dr. Kyle Stepney - Surgery
- Police Academy (1984) - Lt. Thaddeus Harris
- Earthlings (1984, TV Series) - Bobo
- Runaway (1984) - Chief
- Police Academy 2: Their First Assignment (1985) - Wedding Guest (uncredited)
- Rustlers' Rhapsody (1985) - Peter
- Warning Sign (1985) - Tom Schmidt
- Newhart (1985, TV Series, S3 E20: "R.I.P. Off") - Kyle Nordoff
- Short Circuit (1986) - Captain Skroeder
- Mannequin (1987) - Felix
- Don't Mean Nothing (1987 Music Video by Richard Marx) - Slime Ball Apartment Manager
- Burglar (1987) - Ray Kirschman
- Police Academy 4: Citizens on Patrol (1987) - Capt. Thaddeus Harris
- Hawaiian Dream (1987) - Captain Pierce
- Police Academy 5: Assignment Miami Beach (1988) - Capt. Thaddeus Harris
- War and Remembrance (1988, TV series) - Cmdr. Jim Grigg
- Police Academy 6: City Under Siege (1989) - Capt. Thaddeus Harris
- The Gifted One (1989, TV film) - Dr. Winslow
- Fine Things (1990, TV film) - Grossman
- Love and Lies (1990, TV film) - Sgt. Halsey
- Q&A (1990) - Bartender (uncredited)
- Doublecrossed (1991) - Camp
- Under Cover (1991, TV series) - Director Waugh
- Write to Kill (1991) - Dean Sutton
- A Mother's Justice (1991, TV film) - Joe Comminger
- Before the Storm (1991, TV film) - Director Waugh
- Bed of Lies (1992, TV film) - Zeke Zbranek
- Dinosaurs (1992, S2 E20: "Nuts to War: Part 2") - Sarge
- An American Story - The Battle of Athens (1992, TV film) - Tom Cantrell
- Dead Before Dawn (1993, TV film) - Masterson
- No Child of Mine (1993, TV film) - Lamar Jenkins
- Police Academy: Mission to Moscow (1994) - Capt. Thaddeus Harris
- Ace Ventura: When Nature Calls (1995) - Lieutenant (uncredited)
- The Siege at Ruby Ridge (1996, TV film) - Ralph Coulter
- Seduction in a Small Town (1997, TV film) - Pat Carter
- The Jeff Foxworthy Show (1996–1997, Series) - Big Jim Foxworthy
- Solomon (1997) - Azarel
- Jesus (1999) - Livio
- Brothers. Dogs. And God. (2000) - Luther Graham
- Paul the Apostle (2000) -Barnabas
- The Thin Blue Lie (2000) - K.C.
- Scorcher (2002) - General Timothy Moore
- Home on the Range (2004) - Rusty, the Dog (voice)
- Nip/Tuck (2005) - Wesley Kringle
- The Closer (2005–2012, TV Series) - Lt. Louie Provenza
- Cake: A Wedding Story (2007) - Howard Canter
- Left Turn Yield (2007) - Man at Crosswalk with Dog
- Johnny's Gone (2011) - Chet
- The Newest Pledge (2012) - Mr. Hodgkinson
- Cupcake Wars Guest Judge (2012)
- I Am Death (2013) - The Killer
- Highly Functional (2017) - Dan
- Major Crimes (2012–2018, TV series) - Lt. Louie Provenza
- Til Life Do Us Part (2020, short film) - Barnaby Barnes
- Stargirl (2022, 1 episode) - Mr. Dugan
