= Family Secrets (1984 film) =

- Genre: Drama
- Written by: Stefanie Powers; Leonora Thuna
- Directed by: Jack Hofsiss
- Starring: Melissa Gilbert; Stefanie Powers; Maureen Stapleton
- Music by: Charles Fox
- Country of origin: United States
- Original language: English

Production
- Executive producers: Sandy Gallin; Raymond Katz
- Producers: Stefanie Powers; Leonora Thuna
- Cinematography: James Crabe
- Editor: Marjorie Fowler
- Running time: 91 minutes
- Production company: Half-Pint Productions

Original release
- Network: NBC
- Release: May 13, 1984

Family Secrets is a 1984 American made-for-television drama film starring Maureen Stapleton, Melissa Gilbert and Stefanie Powers (who also co-wrote and co-produced). The TV film was directed by Jack Hofsiss.

== Synopsis ==
Three generations of female family members spend time together over an emotional weekend.

== Cast ==
- Melissa Gilbert as Sara Calloway
- Stefanie Powers as Jessie Calloway
- Marion Ramsey as Linda Jones
- Kimmy Robertson as Mickey
- Gary Sinise as Motorcyclist
- James Spader as Lowell Everall
- Maureen Stapleton as Maggie Lukauer
- Irene Tedrow as Mrs. Fenwick

== Release ==
The film was broadcast on NBC May 13, 1984.

=== Home media ===
The film was released on VHS on January 1, 1987.

== Production ==
The working title of the film was Mother's Day.
