= James Wang =

James Wang may refer to:

- James C. Wang (born 1936), Taiwan-born biologist
- James Z. Wang (born 1972), American computer scientist
- James Wang (actor), Chinese actor and casting agent
- James Wang, founder of the animation studio Wang Film Productions

== See also ==
- Jimmy Wang (disambiguation)
- James Wong (disambiguation)
