= Theresa Knorr =

American murderer (born 1946)

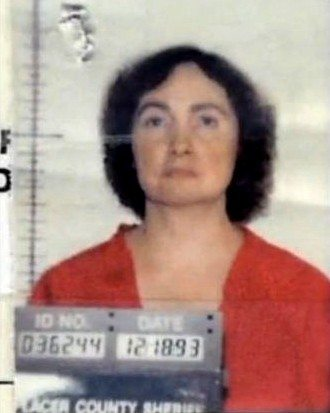
- 1993 mugshot of Theresa Knorr
- Born: Theresa Jimmie Francine Cross; March 14, 1946 (age 80); Sacramento, California, U.S.
- Spouses: Clifford Clyde Sanders (m. 1962; died 1964) Robert Knorr (m. 1966; div. 1970) Ronald Pulliam (m. 1971; div. 1972) Chet Harris (m. 1976; div. 1976)
- Children: Howard Knorr (né Sanders; born 1963); Sheila Knorr (1965–1985); Suesan Knorr (1966–1984); William Knorr (born 1967); Robert Knorr, Jr. (born 1968); Theresa "Terry" Knorr-Walker (1970–2011)
- Status: Incarcerated
- Conviction: First degree murder (2 counts)
- Penalty: 50 years to life

Details
- Victims: 2
- Span of crimes: 1984–1985
- Country: United States
- State: California
- Date apprehended: November 11, 1993; 32 years ago
- Imprisoned at: California Institution for Women

Theresa Jimmie Francine Knorr (née Cross; born March 14, 1946) is an American woman convicted of torturing and murdering two of her six children while using the others to facilitate and cover up her crimes. She was acquitted of murdering her first husband and was also considered a suspect in the unsolved murder of her sister Rosemary Norris. She is currently serving two consecutive life sentences at the California Institution for Women in Chino, California.

== Early life ==
Theresa Cross was born on March 14, 1946, in Sacramento, California, the younger of two daughters born to Swannie Gay (née Myers) and James Cross. Theresa's mother had a son and a daughter from a previous marriage. Her father worked as an assistant cheese maker at a local dairy, eventually saving up enough money to buy a house in Rio Linda. In the late-1950s, Jim Cross was diagnosed with Parkinson's disease, which forced him to quit his job. He developed depression and reportedly took his frustrations and anger out on his family. Swannie Cross kept the family afloat financially. Theresa was reportedly very close to her mother and was devastated when she died of congestive heart failure on March 2, 1961. Unable to keep the family home after that, her father sold it.

== Marriages ==
On September 29, 1962, a 16-year-old Theresa married 21-year-old Clifford Clyde Sanders, whom she had met a few months earlier. She immediately dropped out of high school and became pregnant, and on July 16, 1963, she gave birth to her first child, Howard Clyde Sanders. The marriage was rocky; Theresa was possessive and repeatedly accused Sanders of infidelity. The couple argued frequently and on June 22, 1964, she claimed that he had punched her in the face during one such argument. She reported the incident to police but refused to press charges against Sanders; the assault charges were subsequently dropped. On July 6, 1964, the day after Sanders' birthday, the couple were arguing because he had spent his birthday out with friends instead of at home. During the argument, Sanders allegedly informed Theresa that he was leaving her. Theresa became enraged and shot Sanders in the back with a rifle as he was walking out the door, killing him.

Theresa was arrested and charged with Sanders' murder, to which she pled not guilty claiming that she was acting in self-defense. During her trial, Theresa, who was pregnant with her second child, claimed that she had shot Sanders because he was a violent alcoholic who had physically abused her. Several of Sanders' relatives testified that he was neither violent nor abusive, while the prosecution claimed that Theresa killed Sanders "maliciously" and "without provocation." Sanders' sister, Lydia Hansen, testified that Theresa was possessive and jealous and "would kill [Sanders] before any other woman could have him." Theresa was acquitted of Sanders' murder on September 22, 1964.

She gave birth to her second child, Sheila Gay Sanders, on March 16, 1965. After Sheila's birth, Theresa began drinking heavily. She regularly drank at the local American Legion hall where she met Estell Thornsberry, a disabled United States Army veteran. The two began a relationship and eventually moved in together. During the relationship, Theresa routinely left her children with Thornsberry while she went out drinking. Thornsberry began to question Theresa when she stayed out for days at a time and ended the relationship a few months later, after discovering that she was having an affair with his best friend. Shortly after the relationship with Thornsberry ended, she met and began a relationship with a United States Marine Corps private named Robert Knorr. She soon became pregnant and the couple married on July 9, 1966.

Theresa's third child, Suesan Marline Knorr, was born on September 27, 1966. The couple had three more children: William Robert Knorr on September 15, 1967; Robert Wallace Knorr Jr. on December 31, 1968; and Theresa "Terry" Marie Knorr on August 5, 1970. However, Theresa's marriage to Robert deteriorated after she began to accuse him of having affairs. Both spouses were known to be volatile and would constantly beat each other and the kids. Fed up with his wife's constant accusations, Robert left her in December 1970 and was granted a divorce in 1971. After the divorce, Robert attempted to see his children but Theresa prevented him from doing so. Theresa married twice more. In 1971 she wed railroad worker Ronald Pulliam, but the marriage fell apart when she began to leave her children with Pulliam while she stayed out all night drinking and partying. He divorced her in 1972 after he became convinced that she was having an affair. Her final marriage was to Sacramento Union copy editor Chester "Chet" Harris, whom she married in August 1976. Theresa's daughter Suesan grew close to Harris, which made Theresa jealous. She filed for divorce from Harris in November 1976 after she reportedly found out that Harris enjoyed taking consensual nude photographs of women.

== Child abuse ==
Theresa was physically, verbally, and psychologically abusive toward her children, behavior that escalated after her fourth divorce. She also gained a tremendous amount of weight, and became reclusive to the point of disconnecting the home phone and refusing to allow the children to have visitors. Knorr and her children lived in Orangevale, California for many years before moving into a two-bedroom apartment in Sacramento; her eldest son Howard reportedly left home before the move to Sacramento. According to neighbors, the Sacramento apartment was filthy and smelled of urine. Neighbors also noticed that the children, whom Knorr never let go outside, seemed fearful, nervous and high-strung.

For years, Knorr abused and tortured her children in various ways, including beating them, force-feeding them, burning them with cigarettes, and throwing knives at them; one of the children was hit with a knife and the mother cleaned the wound and stopped the bleeding. She made her children hold each other down while she assaulted them with a special beating paddle. In one instance, Knorr held a pistol to her youngest daughter Terry's head and threatened to kill her. Knorr primarily focused her anger and abuse on Terry's older sisters, Sheila and Suesan. Terry said in an interview that her mother resented that Sheila and Suesan were maturing and blossoming into attractive young women while she faced the prospect of losing her looks as she aged.

Knorr also believed that her fourth husband, Chet Harris, had turned Suesan into a witch, so Suesan received the worst of Knorr's abuse. After one severe beating, Suesan ran away from home. She was picked up by police and placed in a psychiatric hospital where she told staff that her mother abused her. Knorr denied the abuse claims and told the hospital staff that Suesan had mental issues. Authorities interviewed the other children but, out of fear, they denied any abuse. Suesan was released back into her mother's custody. Knorr immediately punished Suesan by beating her while wearing a pair of leather gloves, and forced Suesan's siblings to take turns in the assault. In the subsequent weeks, Knorr handcuffed Suesan to the kitchen table and ordered her other children to stand and watch over her; she remained handcuffed under the table for two years, intermittently being allowed to get up due to pressure sores, and being force fed. If she vomited, she was forced to eat the vomit. Previously, she had forced Suesan to drop out of school and forbade her to leave the house. Knorr also pulled her other children out of school, removing their access to phones and not allowing them outdoors; most of them never advanced past the eighth grade.

== Deaths ==
=== Suesan Marline Knorr ===
For two years, Knorr tortured Suesan by handcuffing her under the dining room table. Knorr would hand feed her from time to time, but she had to have a mouth gag on. Suesan eventually could not handle the torture anymore and begged her mother to release her. The next morning on July 16, 1984, Knorr went on a rampage and started hitting all her children. She uncuffed Suesan for a minute, but handed Terry a gun to point at her and shoot her if she moved. While Knorr and the other children were in the kitchen preparing oatmeal, one of them dropped a spoon; the noise frightened Terry, causing her to accidentally pull the trigger and shoot Suesan. Knorr immediately rechained her under the dining-room table; her only response to the fact that her daughter was profusely bleeding, begging to be taken to the hospital was to get upset that her blood had stained the carpet. Knorr decided to "nurse" Suesan back to health, making her stay in the bathtub for several weeks. Suesan survived the shooting and continually begged her mother to let her leave. Knorr demanded to remove the bullet before letting Suesan go; she managed to gouge the bullet out while Suesan was unconscious, which led to infection and sepsis. That same day, Knorr packed all of Suesan's belongings in trash bags and, after binding her arms and legs and placing duct tape over her mouth, ordered her sons Robert and William to put Suesan in their car. They drove her to Squaw Valley, where Robert and William placed her on the side of the road on top of the bags containing her belongings. Knorr ordered Robert to douse the bags and Suesan in gasoline and set fire to them; Robert thought she was already dead, but she was still alive. Suesan's still-smoldering body was found the following day. Due to the state of her remains, a positive identification was never made, and Suesan was classified as homicide case Jane Doe #4873/84. Suesan was 17 years old at the time of her death.

=== Sheila Gay Sanders ===
Following Suesan's death, Knorr began directing the majority of her anger and abuse towards her 20-year-old daughter Sheila, forcing her into prostitution in May 1985 to support the family. Knorr did not work and received unemployment benefits from the state of California. Knorr was so pleased with this arrangement because of the large amounts of money Sheila was earning that she allowed Sheila to leave the house whenever she pleased.

However, after a few weeks, Knorr became angry and accused Sheila of being pregnant and contracting a sexually transmitted disease which Knorr claimed to have caught from Sheila via a toilet seat. When Sheila denied the accusations, Knorr beat her, hog tied her, and locked her in a tiny closet with no ventilation. Knorr forbade the other children to give her food or water or open the closet door, but Terry disobeyed her mother and gave Sheila a beer. Terry later said, "She [Theresa] wanted Sheila to confess. That was Mother's way: beat them until they confess." To end the punishment, Sheila confessed to being pregnant, but Knorr claimed that she was lying and refused to let her out of the closet. Sheila died three days later, on June 21, 1985, of dehydration and starvation.

Knorr left Sheila's body in the closet for an additional three days before discovering that she was dead. Once again she ordered her sons William and Robert to dispose of their sister's body, which had begun to decompose and fill the apartment with a foul stench. The boys placed Sheila's body in a cardboard box, which they disposed of near Truckee-Tahoe Airport. Sheila's body was discovered a few hours after it had been disposed of but was never positively identified and was classified as Jane Doe #6607-85.

Although Sheila's body had been removed from the closet, the smell of decomposition still lingered in the apartment, and Knorr became concerned that the smell and physical evidence in the closet could implicate her in Sheila's death. On September 29, 1986, she moved the family's belongings out of the apartment and ordered Terry to burn it down to eliminate any physical evidence. During the night, Terry dumped three containers of lighter fluid on the apartment floor and set it on fire, but the fire did little damage as neighbors quickly reported it before it spread; the closet in which Sheila died was not damaged. After Knorr's arrest, investigators were able to remove the subfloor from the closet to test it for physical evidence.

After leaving the Sacramento apartment, Knorr went into hiding. Her sons Howard and William, who were of legal age by then, severed all ties with her; 16-year-old Terry also escaped from her mother and used Sheila's identification card to pass herself off as a legal adult. The only child to remain with Knorr was 19-year-old Robert Knorr Jr. and he moved to Las Vegas, Nevada, and attempted to keep a low profile. In November 1991, Knorr Jr. was arrested after he fatally shot a bartender in a Las Vegas bar during an attempted robbery. He was sentenced to 16 years in prison. Shortly after his arrest, Knorr left Las Vegas and relocated to Salt Lake City, Utah.

== Arrests, convictions and aftermath ==
After escaping from her mother, Terry attempted to report her sisters' murders to the Utah police, but they dismissed her stories as fiction, as did a therapist she visited. On October 28, 1993, Terry phoned the hotline for the Fox television program America's Most Wanted, and was told to contact detectives in Placer County, California, where Suesan's body had been found. Placer County detectives took her claims seriously and followed up with an investigation, soon linking the two Jane Does found in the area in 1984 and 1985 to Terry's detailed stories of her sisters' deaths. William Knorr was arrested on November 4, 1993, in Woodland, California, where he had been living and working. Robert Knorr Jr. was charged with his sisters' murders while he was serving his 16-year sentence in an Ely, Nevada, prison; William and Robert's stories tallied very closely. On November 10, 1993, Knorr herself was arrested at her home in Salt Lake City. At the time of her arrest she was using her maiden name of "Cross" and working as a caregiver for her landlord's 86-year-old mother.

On November 15, 1993, Theresa Knorr was charged with two counts of murder, two counts of conspiracy to commit murder, and two special circumstances charges: multiple murder and murder by torture. Knorr initially pleaded not guilty, but then made a deal with the prosecution after learning that her son Robert Jr. had agreed to testify against her in exchange for a reduced sentence. She pleaded guilty on the condition that she be spared the death penalty. On October 17, 1995, Knorr was sentenced to two consecutive life sentences. She is incarcerated at California Institution for Women in Chino, California. Knorr had a parole hearing in July 2019, but was denied release. To this day, she does not take full responsibility for the deaths of her daughters. She admits to killing Suesan, saying she was drunk and hallucinating demons that she wanted to free Suesan from. However, Knorr blames Terry for not only shooting Suesan, but also accusing her of selling Sheila into prostitution and killing her.

William Knorr was sentenced to probation and ordered to undergo therapy for participating in his sister Suesan's murder. In exchange for his testimony, the prosecution dropped all charges against Robert Knorr Jr. save for one count of being an accessory-after-the-fact in relation to Sheila's murder. Robert Jr. pleaded guilty to the charge and was sentenced to three years in prison, which was served concurrently with his 16-year sentence in Nevada. In 2016, he was sentenced to 8 years in prison for possession of child pornography. After running away from her mother's home, Terry Knorr married twice and eventually moved to Sandy, Utah, where she lived with her second husband. She worked as a grocery store cashier in the same neighborhood where her mother had also lived and worked before her arrest. Theresa and Terry apparently did not know they lived in close proximity and had no contact. Terry Knorr died at 41 in 2011.

Following Theresa Knorr's arrest, police decided to reopen the murder case of her older sister, Rosemary Norris, who was found strangled to death at the end of a dead-end road in Placer County in 1983 after she went grocery shopping in Sacramento. Police later determined that Knorr was not involved in Norris' death. Her murder remains unsolved.

== In popular culture ==
The 2010 horror film The Afflicted (also titled Another American Crime) is loosely based on the Theresa Knorr case. The film follows the real-life events through a substantially-compressed timeline. Unlike the real case, the movie ends with the youngest daughter killing her mother and one of her brothers before dying by suicide.

The murders were profiled on the A&E series Cold Case Files, featuring an exclusive interview with Terry Knorr Walker. The case was also profiled on the series Most Evil, Wicked Attraction, Evil Lives Here, and Deadly Women.

Doctor Michael H. Stone, host of the show Most Evil, also analyzed Knorr's case in his 2009 book The Anatomy of Evil, using the same scale of evil to classify Knorr and her crimes.

The second verse of folk-pop artist Nicole Dollanganger's "In The Land" heavily references the abuse of Knorr's daughters.
