= Sunshine Kids Foundation =

US non-profit organization

The Sunshine Kids Foundation is a non-profit organization established by Rhoda Tomasco, in Houston, Texas, in 1982 that provides a variety of free programs and events for children who are receiving cancer treatments in hospitals across the United States and North America.

Since 2001, the executive director of the Sunshine Kids Foundation has been actor G.W. Bailey, who has volunteered with the group for over fifteen years since being introduced to the organization by his goddaughter, who was diagnosed with leukemia in 1982.

In 2004, the group had a total revenue of over $1.9 million, and spent nearly $1.3 million on program expenses.
