= Hugh Wilson (director) =

American director, writer and actor (1943–2018)

- Born: Hugh Hamilton Wilson Jr. August 21, 1943; Miami, Florida, U.S.
- Died: January 14, 2018 (aged 74); Charlottesville, Virginia, U.S.
- Education: University of Florida
- Occupations: Writer, director
- Spouse: Charters Smith (m. 1979)
- Children: 5

Hugh Hamilton Wilson Jr. (August 21, 1943 – January 14, 2018) was an American film director, writer and television showrunner. He was the creator of the TV series WKRP in Cincinnati and Frank's Place, and was the director of the film comedies Police Academy and The First Wives Club.

== Early life ==
Wilson was born in Miami, Florida. He attended Coral Way Elementary, Ponce de Leon Jr. High, and Coral Gables Sr. High, where he was a member of the Ching Tang Fraternity. He entered the University of Florida in 1961 and graduated in 1964 with a degree in journalism. At Florida, he was a member of the Blue Key Honor Society and president of his fraternity, Phi Delta Theta. Wilson received the school's Distinguished Alumnus award in 1982. He has also served as a guest professor of media studies at the University of Virginia.

== Career ==
In 1966, he entered the advertising business in Atlanta at the Burton-Campbell Agency. He was a copywriter before becoming creative director in 1970 and president in 1973. Tom Patchett and Jay Tarses, producers of The Bob Newhart Show, were instrumental in getting Wilson a position with MTM Enterprises in 1975. They, along with Grant Tinker, gave him his first writing assignment for the Bob Newhart Show in early 1976 and in 1977 made him a co-producer of the Tony Randall Show. In 1978, Wilson created WKRP in Cincinnati (1978–1982) for CBS. Two of his WKRP scripts won Humanitas Prizes and the show was nominated twice for the Emmy in the Best Comedy category. The character of Bailey Quarters on WKRP was based on Wilson's wife.

Wilson attempted to break into movies by re-writing a low-budget comedy on the condition that he could direct it. The result was the first Police Academy for the Ladd Company (Warners) and producer Paul Maslansky. It was a surprise hit of 1984. In 1985, Wilson shot the singing cowboy comedy Rustlers' Rhapsody, starring Tom Berenger and Sela Ward. The movie was filmed in Spain. "I grew up watching Roy and Gene and Hopalong Cassidy," Wilson said in the production notes. "That was my idea of a movie." The movie failed at the box office but has gained a strong cult following over the years. The same year, he created the short-lived television series Easy Street starring Loni Anderson.

In 1988, Wilson returned to CBS to create and co-produce with Tim Reid the highly regarded but short-lived (22 episodes) Frank's Place. Along with The Days and Nights of Molly Dodd (created by Jay Tarses) the two shows were the first to be done in the style that has come to be known as "dramedy." Wilson received three Emmy nominations for Frank's Place and won the Emmy for Best Writing. Wilson also created the CBS show The Famous Teddy Z (1989) and directed the movies Guarding Tess (1994) and Blast from the Past (1999).

His biggest film hit after Police Academy came in 1996 with The First Wives Club. The film became a surprise box-office success following its North American release, eventually grossing $181,490,000 worldwide, mostly from its domestic run, despite receiving mixed reviews, and developed a cult following particularly among middle-aged women. For its stars, including Bette Midler, Goldie Hawn and Diane Keaton, the actresses' highest-grossing project of the decade helped revitalize their careers in film and television.

In 2003, Wilson and John Grisham teamed up to make Mickey, an independent movie about little league baseball.

== Personal life and death ==
Wilson married Charters Smith in 1979, with whom he had five children. Daughter Caroline Charters Wilson is an actress and singer. Wilson moved to Virginia in 1992 and sometimes taught screenwriting at the University of Virginia. Wilson was a Roman Catholic.

Wilson died on January 14, 2018, in Charlottesville, Virginia, at the age of 74 of lung cancer and emphysema.

== Filmography ==
=== Film ===
Year	Title	Director	Writer	Producer	Notes
1972	The Bagel Report	Yes	Yes	Yes	Also editor
1983	Stroker Ace		Yes		
1984	Police Academy	Yes	Yes		
1985	Rustlers' Rhapsody	Yes	Yes		
1987	Burglar	Yes	Yes		
1994	Guarding Tess	Yes	Yes		
1996	Down Periscope		Yes		
1996	The First Wives Club	Yes			
1998	Southie			Yes	
1999	Blast from the Past	Yes	Yes	Yes	
1999	Dudley Do-Right	Yes	Yes	Yes	
2004	Mickey	Yes			
2012	Keepers of the Flame		Yes		Documentary short

Acting roles

Year	Title	Role
1984	Police Academy	Angry Driver
1985	Rustlers' Rhapsody	Complaining John
1987	Burglar	Customer at Mayday
1994	Guarding Tess	President (voice)
1996	The First Wives Club	Commercial Director
1999	Blast from the Past	Levy
1999	One More Kiss	Frank's false teeth
2004	Mickey	Munson

=== Television ===
Year	Title	Director	Writer	Executive producer	Creator	Notes
1976	The Bob Newhart Show		Yes			3 episodes
1976–78	The Tony Randall Show	Yes	Yes	Yes		Director (4 episodes), writer (6 episodes)
1978–82	WKRP in Cincinnati	Yes	Yes	Yes	Yes	Director (2 episodes), writer (17 episodes); Also theme songwriter
1986–87	Easy Street	Yes	Yes	Yes	Yes	Directed 3 episodes, wrote episode "The Mad Gardener"
1987–88	Frank's Place	Yes	Yes	Yes	Yes	Director (7 episodes), writer (9 episodes)
1989–90	The Famous Teddy Z	Yes	Yes	Yes	Yes	Director (3 episodes), writer (4 episodes)
1991	Sunday in Paris	Yes		Yes		TV short
1991–93	The New WKRP in Cincinnati				Yes	
1997	Rough Riders		Yes			Miniseries
1997–98	Animal Crackers		Yes			

TV movies

Year	Title	Director	Writer	Producer	Notes
1977	The Chopped Liver Brothers	Yes	Yes		
2000	The Contender	Yes	Yes	Yes	Unaired pilot for UPN

Acting roles

Year	Title	Role	Notes
1978	WKRP in Cincinnati	Policeman #1	Episode: "Hold Up"
1988	Frank's Place	D. Wayne Thomas	Episode: "Where's Ed?"
