= Police Academy (film) =

1984 American film by Hugh Wilson

- Theatrical release poster by Drew Struzan
- Directed by: Hugh Wilson
- Screenplay by: Neal Israel; Pat Proft; Hugh Wilson
- Story by: Neal Israel; Pat Proft
- Produced by: Paul Maslansky
- Starring: Steve Guttenberg; Kim Cattrall; Bubba Smith; George Gaynes
- Cinematography: Michael D. Margulies
- Edited by: Robert Brown; Zach Staenberg
- Music by: Robert Folk
- Production company: The Ladd Company
- Distributed by: Warner Bros.
- Release date: March 23, 1984
- Running time: 96 minutes
- Country: United States
- Language: English
- Budget: $4.8 million
- Box office: $149.8 million

Police Academy is a 1984 American comedy film directed by Hugh Wilson in his directorial debut, and distributed by Warner Bros. Its storyline follows a new recruitment policy for an unnamed city's police academy to take in any recruit who wishes to apply and study to become a police officer. The film stars Steve Guttenberg, Kim Cattrall and G. W. Bailey.

The film was produced by The Ladd Company. It premiered on March 23, 1984. It grossed $8.5 million in its opening weekend and more than $149 million worldwide, against a budget of $4.8 million, and remains the most successful film of the series as of 2022. The film spawned six sequels in the Police Academy franchise, and is the only film in the franchise to be rated R (due to nudity) by the MPAA.

== Plot ==
In an unnamed city, the mayor orders the Metropolitan Police to accept all willing applicants for training, regardless of suitability. Hundreds apply, including rich girl Karen Thompson, reformed criminal and human beatbox Larvell Jones, gentle giant Moses Hightower, gun fanatic Eugene Tackleberry, lothario George Martin, soft-spoken Laverne Hooks, accident-prone Douglas Fackler, and bullied Leslie Barbara. Rebellious underachiever Carey Mahoney, arrested for yet another petty crime, is offered a deal by Captain Reed, a friend of his late father's, to avoid jail by enrolling in the academy. Planning to misbehave until expelled, Mahoney soon learns from Commandant Eric Lassard that he cannot quit or be dismissed until training ends.

Dismayed at being forced to take undesirable recruits, Police Chief Henry Hurst schemes to drive them out by making training intolerable. Under ruthless Lieutenant Thaddeus Harris, several cadets drop out. Harris targets Mahoney, believing his presence is disruptive, but when offered a chance to leave, Mahoney refuses, having developed a mutual attraction to Karen. Harris appoints cadets Chad Copeland and Kyle Blankes as squad leaders to spy on and harass the others. Their attempt to infiltrate a party backfires when Mahoney tricks them into entering the Blue Oyster Bar, where they are forced to dance with the gay biker patrons. In retaliation, they plant a prostitute in Barbara's room before inspection; Mahoney tries to smuggle her out, but they are forced to hide under a lectern during Lassard's presentation, where the prostitute unexpectedly performs fellatio on Lassard. When Lassard later sees Mahoney leaving, he assumes Mahoney was responsible.

Hightower asks Mahoney to teach him to drive before the cadet test. They steal Copeland's car to practice, evade a police pursuit, and leave it badly damaged. Following Hightower's successful completion of the test, Copeland racially insults Hooks after she drives over his feet. Enraged, Hightower overturns a police cruiser with Copeland inside it, leading to his ejection from the academy. Later, Copeland and Blankes try to provoke Mahoney into a fight over the ruined car, but Barbara intervenes and strikes Copeland, starting a brawl. Harris moves to expel Barbara, but Mahoney takes the blame and is dismissed.

Meanwhile, Fackler throws an apple from his police car during patrol—inadvertently striking a man who assumes someone else is responsible—starting a fight which escalates into a citywide riot. Though no longer a cadet, Mahoney joins the cadets deployed to manage traffic, but they find themselves mistakenly in the center of the riots and heavily outnumbered. One criminal steals Blankes' and Copeland's revolvers and takes Harris hostage on a rooftop. Mahoney tries to help, but the criminal threatens to kill Harris, and Mahoney is forced to surrender. Hightower, having followed the chaos, arrives and deceives the criminal into thinking he is on his side, before punching him down a flight of stairs, where he is arrested by Hooks.

At graduation, Mahoney and Hightower, now reinstated, receive awards for bravery. As Mahoney prepares his speech, Lassard is revealed to have hidden the prostitute under the lectern in retaliation for the earlier incident.

== Cast ==
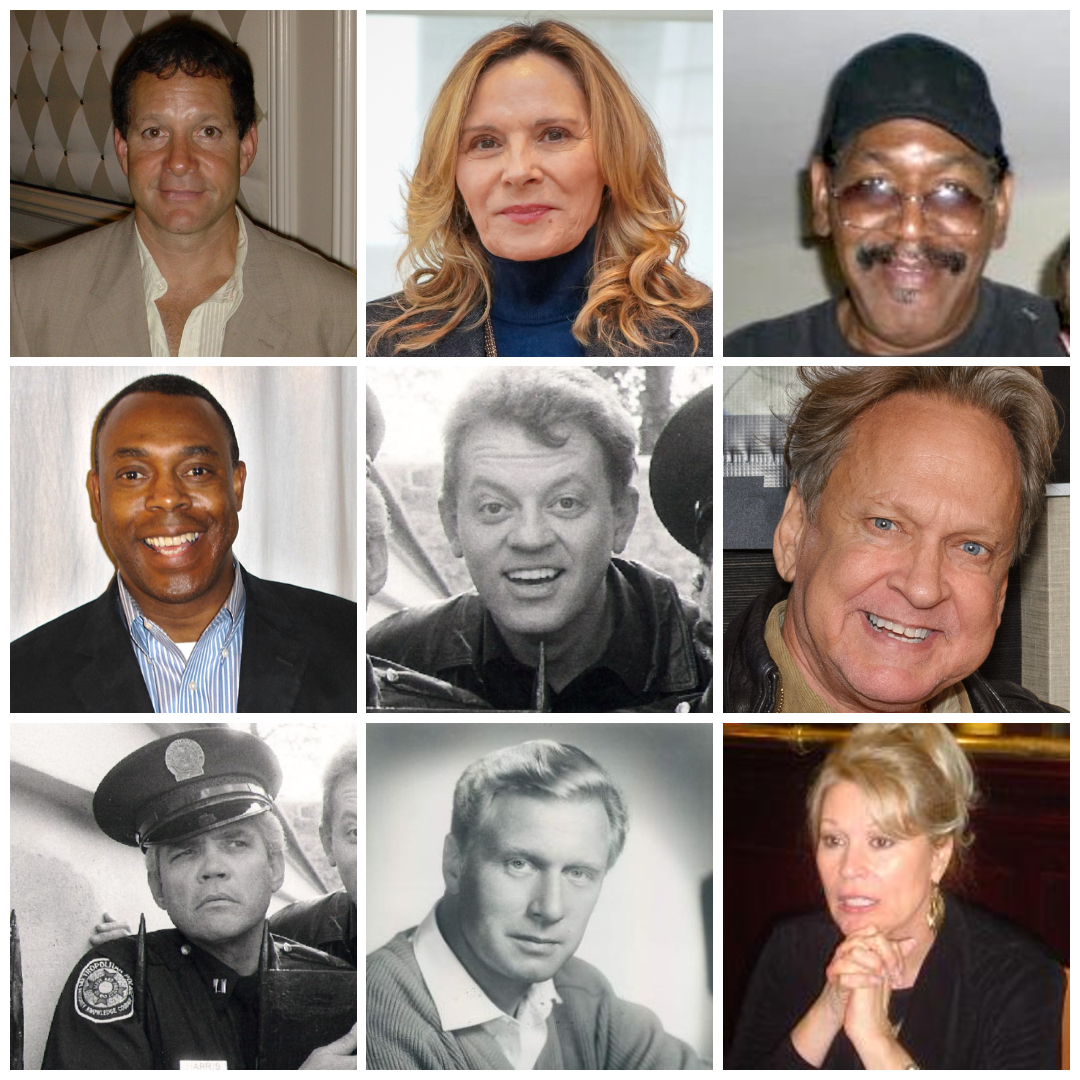
Steve Guttenberg (pictured in 2005), Kim Cattrall (2024), Bubba Smith (2009), Michael Winslow (2009), David Graf (1989), Scott Thomson (2017), G. W. Bailey (1989), George Gaynes (1964), and Leslie Easterbrook (2006)

- Steve Guttenberg as Cadet Carey Mahoney
- Kim Cattrall as Cadet Karen Thompson
- Bubba Smith as Cadet Moses Hightower
- Donovan Scott as Cadet Leslie Barbara
- Michael Winslow as Cadet Larvell Jones
- Andrew Rubin as Cadet George Martin
- David Graf as Cadet Eugene Tackleberry
- Bruce Mahler as Cadet Douglas Fackler
- Marion Ramsey as Cadet Laverne Hooks
- Brant von Hoffman as Cadet Kyle Blankes
- Scott Thomson as Cadet Chad Copeland
- G. W. Bailey as Lieutenant Thaddeus Harris
- George Gaynes as Commandant Eric Lassard
- Leslie Easterbrook as Sergeant Debbie Callahan
- George R. Robertson as Chief Henry J. Hurst
- Debralee Scott as Violet Fackler
- Ted Ross as Captain Reed
- Doug Lennox as Main Bad Guy
- Georgina Spelvin as Hooker
- Don Lake as Mr. Wig
- Michael J. Reynolds as Office Executive
- Gary Farmer as Sidewalk Store Owner
- John Hawkes as Tesky Truck Driver
- Kay Hawtrey as Surprise Party Lady
- T. J. Scott as Tough
- Dar Robinson as Plaid Thug
- Hugh Wilson as Angry Driver

== Production ==
=== Development ===
Paul Maslansky says he got the idea for the film when in San Francisco filming The Right Stuff:

I noticed a bunch of ludicrous-looking police cadets being dressed down by a frustrated sergeant. They were an unbelievable bunch, including a lady who must have weighed over 200 pounds and a flabby man well over 50. I asked the sergeant about them, and he explained that the mayor had ordered the department to accept a broad spectrum for the police academy. "We have to take them in,"...[he said] ..."And the only thing we can do is wash them out."

Maslansky said he wondered "But what if they actually made it?" He took the idea to Alan Ladd Jr., who agreed to finance. Neal Israel was hired to write the script with Pat Proft. Israel said:

It's a matter of block comedy scenes. Perhaps the most recognizable was the obvious results of guys eating beans in Blazing Saddles. If you have four or five of these block comedy scenes in a teen-age comedy, you have a hit. If your block comedy scenes are very, very strong ones, you have a blockbuster.

Dom DeLuise was considered to direct the film but he was unavailable. Hugh Wilson was hired as director based on his success with WKRP in Cincinnati, even though he was not familiar with many films of this genre. He then saw a lot of those sort. saying "it was fairly discouraging. This immediately convinced me to cut down on the sleaze. I asked for, and got, the power to refine the Israel-Proft script. Maintaining that 'funny is money,' I wanted to go for real laughter rather than going for the elements such as gratuitous sex and anti-Establishment exploits. I wanted jokes which were rooted in reality."

Maslansky says Wilson "took a lot of the vulgarity out; some of the very things I considered necessary. I worried that it was becoming more homogenized, and I told Hugh, "Let's keep some of the flatulence in."

Wilson says "I found out that the shower scene, the party scene, and the fellatio scene were obligatory; I had to put them in. So I was stuck with trying to make those scenes as artistic as possible."

According to the Los Angeles Times, about "20 of the major elements in the movie" remain from the Israel and Proft version. Israel says that when Wilson and Maslansky turned in their rewrite to the Ladd Company, "it was rejected and the project was almost shelved. Only when they put back in dozens of our gags did the project get the go ahead."

Some of the scenes Wilson was unhappy with included the fellatio scene and the scene where Captain Thaddeus Harris was hurled into the backside of a horse. A compromise was reached where these acts were not actually directly shown.

"I realize that you can carry grossness, rudeness, and crudeness just so far before the audience finds it terribly repetitive and not so funny," said Wilson. "After the enormous success of Police Academy, I no longer believe that you have to show the female breast or make cruel ethnic jokes, not to mention the rampant sexism. And you don't have to reproduce the sounds that an overfed body makes."

=== Casting ===
The producers considered Michael Keaton, Tom Hanks and Judge Reinhold for the role of Carey Mahoney; and Bruce Willis auditioned for the role.

=== Filming ===
Opening scenes were shot in Toronto, Ontario. The camera booth scene was shot on the Cherry Street Bridge in Toronto. The academy itself was previously the site of the Lakeshore Psychiatric Hospital in Etobicoke, and has since become the Lakeshore campus of Humber College. The studio scenes were shot at Lakeshore Film Studios; the city scenes were filmed in various parts of Toronto. The riot scenes was filmed at Kensington Market in Toronto. The Silver Dollar Room on Spadina Avenue is the real name of the bar that was filmed for the Blue Oyster Bar scenes.

== Music ==
In 2013, La-La Land Records issued a limited edition album of Robert Folk's score.

1. "Main Title/Night Rounds" (1:52)
2. "Rounds Resume/Tackleberry" (1:10)
3. "Barbara" (0:51)
4. "Join Up" (1:10)
5. "The Academy" (1:16)
6. "Recruits" (1:54)
7. "Pussycat/Uniforms" (1:56)
8. "Assignment" (1:20)
9. "Formation/Move Out" (3:26)
10. "Obstacles" (2:15)
11. "Martin and Company" (0:46)
12. "Ball Games" (0:27)
13. "More Martin" (0:28)
14. "Regrets" (1:05)
15. "Guns/In Drag" (4:01)
16. "Warpath" (0:28)
17. "Improvement" (1:15)
18. "Jam Up" (0:42)
19. "Hightower Drive" (1:37)
20. "Santa Claus Is Comin' to Town" - J. Fred Coots and Haven Gillespie (0:40)
21. "Need to Talk/Hightower Leaves" (1:16)
22. "Riot Starts" (1:25)
23. "Riot Gear" (2:42)
24. "SOB" (0:32)
25. "Match" (1:44)
26. "Where's Harris?" (2:40)
27. "Straighten Up" (1:26)
28. "Police Academy March" (1:06)
29. "El Bimbo" - Claude Morgan, performed by Jean-Marc Dompierre and His Orchestra (1:49)

== Release ==
=== Home media ===
Police Academy was released on VHS home video in the film's original widescreen aspect ratio. In Europe, it was released on VHS under the expanded title Police Academy: What An Institution! Police Academy: 20th Anniversary Special Edition (1984) was released on DVD around the world in 2004. Special features include a "Making of" documentary, audio commentary by the film's cast, and the film's original theatrical trailer.

Police Academy: The Complete Collection [1984-1994] was released on DVD as a box set containing all seven Police Academy films made between 1984 and 1994. Police Academy, Police Academy 2: Their First Assignment, Police Academy 3: Back in Training, Police Academy 6: City Under Siege, and Police Academy: Mission to Moscow were in the film's theatrical widescreen 1.85-to-1 aspect ratio, while Police Academy 4: Citizens on Patrol and Police Academy 5: Assignment Miami Beach were in the TV aspect ratio of 1.33-to-1. All seven films have multi-language subtitles and their own featurettes.

4 Film Favorites: Police Academy 1-4 Collection is a DVD set released on September 15, 2009. It contains the first four films in the series on three discs, the first two separately, while the third and fourth films are a single, double-sided disc. Police Academy 5-7 were later released as a DVD set entitled 4 Film Favorites: Cop Comedy Collection, packaged along with the feature film National Lampoon's Loaded Weapon 1 (1993).

Police Academy: What an Institution! was released on July 1, 2013, as a Region Free Blu-ray single disc, with special features included.

== Reception ==
=== Box office ===
Police Academy opened in the number 1 spot in 1,587 U.S. theaters on March 23, 1984, to a first weekend total gross of $8.6 million. The film went on to gross $81.2 million, becoming the 6th highest-grossing American film of 1984. It grossed $68.6 million overseas for a total worldwide gross of $149.8 million. The film made a profit of $35 million.

=== Critical response ===
Police Academy received mixed reviews from critics. On Rotten Tomatoes, it has an approval rating of 58% based on 33 reviews, with the critical consensus reading: “Police Academy is rude, crude, and proudly sophomoric – which is either a condemnation or a ringing endorsement, depending on your taste in comedy.” On Metacritic the film has a score of 41 out of 100 based on reviews from 6 critics, indicating "mixed or average reviews".

Roger Ebert, of the Chicago Sun-Times, gave the film zero stars out of four, commenting: “It's really something. It's so bad, maybe you should pool your money and draw straws and send one of the guys off to rent it so that in the future, whenever you think you're sitting through a bad comedy, he could shake his head, and chuckle tolerantly, and explain that you don't know what bad is”.

Critic Vincent Canby, of The New York Times, gave a mixed review, saying: “The movie plows through one outrageous sequence to the next with the momentum of a freight train”. Rita Kemply, of The Washington Post, wrote: “Attention, all units: Slapstick in progress in the vicinity of Police Academy. Suspects wanted for mugging the camera [...] with the intent to incite a laugh riot. Please respond to this blues burlesque, a uniformly funny hit sure to have a long run. Its target audience: those who can take their T&A with a grain of assault. Its plot [is] a combo of Animal House and An Officer and a Gentleman. Its stars a rainbow coalition of hot newcomers and dependable, unexpendable pros.”

Producer Paul Maslansky says that original feedback on the film was that it was not gross enough, with one executive reportedly saying: “What are you trying to do, make a damned Tootsie?”; and another claiming: “Paul, it doesn't fit the formula; it needs more flatulence, more slobbishness, more T&A.”

== Sequel ==
A sequel, the first of several, titled Police Academy 2: Their First Assignment, was released in 1985.

A remake of the film produced by Keegan-Michael Key and Jordan Peele was in development but cancelled following the killing of Michael Brown.
