= James Wong =

James Wong may refer to:

- James Wong (bishop) (born 1960), Anglican bishop of the Seychelles
- James Wong (ethnobotanist) (born 1981), British ethnobotanist, television presenter and garden designer
- James Wong Chye Fook (born 1952), former Malaysian footballer
- James Wong Kim Min (1922–2011), Malaysian politician
- James Wong (filmmaker) (born 1959), Cantonese-American television producer, writer, and film director
- Jimmy Wong (James Franklin Wong, born 1987), American actor, musician, and filmmaker
- James Wong Jim (1940–2004), Chinese lyricist
- James Wong Howe (1899–1976), cinematographer
- James C. L. Wong (1900–1970), bishop of the Episcopal Diocese of Taiwan

== See also ==
- James Wang (disambiguation)
- Jimmy Wang (disambiguation)
