= Michael Winslow =

American actor, comedian and beatboxer

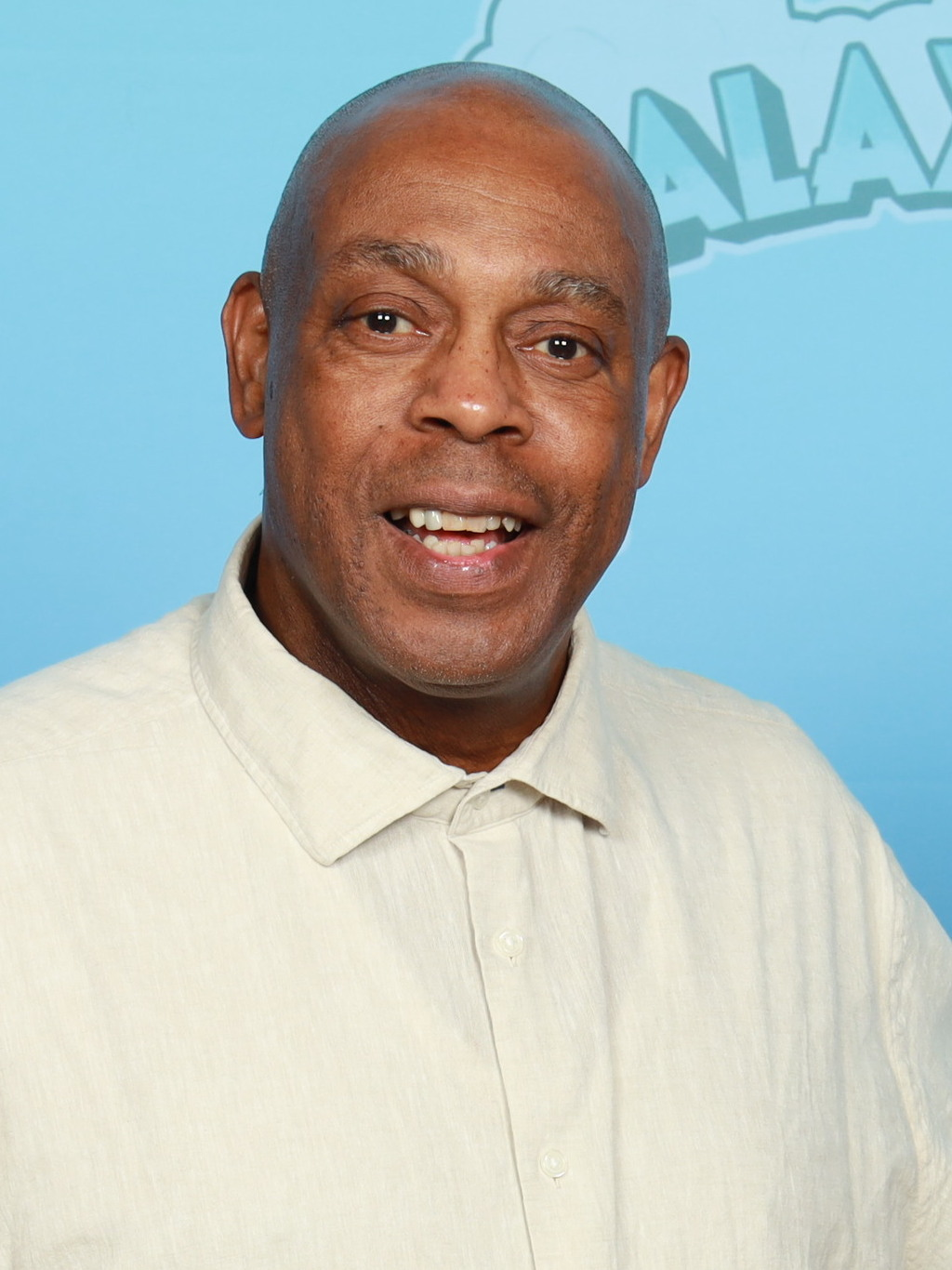
- Winslow at GalaxyCon Richmond in 2026
- Born: Michael Leslie Winslow; September 6, 1958 (age 68); Spokane, Washington, U.S.
- Notable work: Comedy Sound Smackdown; Larvell Jones in Police Academy; Radar Technician in Spaceballs
- Children: 2

Comedy career
- Years active: 1980–present
- Medium: Stand-up, film, television, radio, voice-over
- Genres: Beatboxing, character comedy, physical comedy, improvisational comedy
- Subjects: Pop culture, American culture
- Website: michaelwinslowmedia.com

Michael Leslie Winslow (born September 6, 1958) is an American actor, comedian, and beatboxer billed as The Man of 10,000 Sound Effects for his ability to make realistic sounds using only his voice. He is best known for his roles in all seven Police Academy films as Larvell Jones. He has also appeared in Spaceballs, Cheech and Chong's Next Movie, Nice Dreams, and The Love Boat, as well as in commercials for Cadbury and GEICO.

== Early life ==
Winslow was born in Spokane, Washington, the son of Verdie and Robert Winslow. He grew up at Fairchild Air Force Base near Spokane, and later attended the Lisa Maile School of Acting, Modeling and Imaging.

According to his own account, Winslow had few friends growing up. To pass time, he would imitate the sounds of engines, animals, flatulence, or anything that made noise. Following high school and college, he performed in nightclubs and theaters, where his sound imitation skills won him positive appraisal and enough money to move to and perform his act in Hollywood.

== Career ==
His first television appearance was on The Gong Show, in which he squeezed in sound-alikes of Benji the movie dog, Star Trek, as a character named Lee on The White Shadow, and Jimi Hendrix's "Purple Haze". He is best known for his role as Larvell Jones in the Police Academy series of movies and TV shows. He was cast in the role after he was seen opening for Count Basie. In 1985, Island Records released a 12-inch (30.5-cm) disc of Michael Winslow entitled "I Am My Own Walkman". The recording peaked at number 60 in Australia.

In 1986, Winslow presented the Best Sound Effects Editing Oscar to Charles L. Campbell and Robert Rutledge for their work on Back to the Future. During 1986, he played the role of Spencer, the assistant cruise director on the ninth and final season of The Love Boat.

In 1987, Winslow appeared as a radar operator in the movie Spaceballs, in which he performs all the sound effects himself during one scene. Mel Brooks (who wrote, directed, produced and co-starred in the film) stated that, by doing so, Winslow saved the film money. Winslow is also a motivational speaker. Since the fall of 2008, Winslow has hosted a motion-picture television series called Way Back Wednesday with Winslow on the cable superstation WGN America, which features movies mostly released in the 1980s. He continues to perform stand-up comedy around the globe.

Michael Winslow debuted his own iPhone and iPod Touch applications in 2010, bringing his sound effects and comedy to a mobile platform. ThatsKungFu generates Winslow's kung fu fighting sounds when the device is swung in a fighting motion. NoizeyMan, billed as the "World's Noiziest App", contains video, ringtones, sound effects and mini games, all created by Winslow.

In 2011, Winslow worked with Orlando, Florida-based game development studio Phyken Media on a mobile game for iOS and Android platforms entitled Wizard Ops Chapter 1, providing all the sound effects for the game. He also lent his voice on Wizard Ops Tactics, a turn-based tactical game and spiritual successor to the previous game.

He was also featured in a commercial for GEICO Insurance during their "we hired a celebrity" advertising campaign.

In 2020, Winslow guest-starred on the Dropout.tv show Game Changer as a substitute for Zac Oyama. He won episode 10 of season three, which aired on January 22, 2021.

In 2021, Winslow auditioned for the 16th season of America's Got Talent. Following the airing of his audition, he had a guest appearance on the Talent Recap Show where he showed viewers how to make some of his most signature noises. Winslow was eliminated during the semifinals.

In 2022, Winslow was heavily featured in a videogamedunkey YouTube video entitled "Video Game Sound".

Michael Winslow contributed voice-over, music, and sound effects to the animated short "Fleetwood Mac & Cheese," which was animated by Brandon Kosters, Matthew Maxwell, and Rob Steinberg. The short was released in 2025.

== Filmography ==
Year	Title	Role
1980	Cheech & Chong's Next Movie	Welfare Comedian
1981	Underground Aces	Nate
1981	Nice Dreams	Superman Nut
1981	Space Stars	Plutem (voice)
1982	Tag: The Assassination Game	Gowdy
1982	Heidi's Song	Mountain (voice)
1984	Police Academy	Cadet Larvell Jones
1984	Alphabet City	Lippy
1984	Gremlins	Mogwai / Gremlins (voice)
1984	Grandview, U.S.A.	Spencer
1985	Police Academy 2: Their First Assignment	Officer Larvell Jones
1985	Starchaser: The Legend of Orin	Voice
1986	Police Academy 3: Back in Training	Sgt. Larvell Jones
1987	Police Academy 4: Citizens on Patrol	Sgt. Larvell Jones
1987	Spaceballs	Radar Technician
1987	Three Crazy Jerks	Walker
1988	Police Academy 5: Assignment Miami Beach	Sgt. Larvell Jones
1988	Starke Zeiten	Mike
1988	Buy & Cell	Sly
1988	Three Crazy Jerks II	Ronny
1989	Police Academy 6: City Under Siege	Sgt. Larvell Jones
1989	Think Big	Hap
1990	New Kids on the Block	Voice
1990	Far Out Man	Airport Cop
1990	Going Under	Reporter
1993	Extralarge	Dumas
1994	Police Academy: Mission to Moscow	Sgt. Larvell Jones
1995	Be Cool about Fire Safety	Himself
1997–98	Police Academy: The Series	Sgt. Larvell Jones
1999	Lycanthrope	Lee Davis
1999	Michael Winslow Live	Himself
1999	The Blur of Insanity	Horner's Friend 2
2000	He Outta Be Committed	Jeremy
2001	The Trumpet of the Swan	Chief (voice)
2002	The Biggest Fan	Officer Man
2004	Grand Theft Auto: San Andreas	Pedestrian (voice)
2005	Lenny the Wonder Dog	John Wyndham
2006	Robot Chicken	Sgt. Larvell Jones
2008	The Great Buck Howard	Himself
2008	Redirecting Eddie	Vaughn
2009	RoboDoc	Dr. Murphy
2010	The History of the Typewriter recited by Michael Winslow	Himself
2010	Tosh.0	Himself
2013	Blunt Movie	Coach Al Jefferson
2013	Gingerclown	Stomachcrumble
2013	Late Night with Jimmy Fallon	Himself
2015	Sharknado 3: Oh Hell No!	Brian Jonesy Jones
2015	Lavalantula	Marty
2015	The Jack and Triumph Show	Himself
2016	Enter the Fist and the Golden Fleece	The Argonaut
2016	Characterz	Police Detective
2016	2 Lava 2 Lantula	Marty
2016	Renaissance Man	Mike
2016	Hospital Arrest	Judge Collaway
2017	Killing Hasselhoff	Himself
2020	Game Changer	Himself
2020	A Wrestling Christmas Miracle	Judge Collaway
2021	America's Got Talent (Season 16)	Himself
2021	Todd	Jake
2022	Video Game Sound	Himself
