= Sean McKittrick =

American film director

- Born: March 20, 1975 (age 51); Berkeley, California, U.S.
- Education: University of California, Los Angeles
- Occupation: Producer
- Years active: 1995–present
- Spouse: Monique Jabre (m. 2013)

Sean McKittrick (born March 20, 1975) is an American film producer. He is best known for his works Donnie Darko, Southland Tales, for which he was nominated for Palme d'Or at 2006 Cannes Film Festival; and Get Out, which earned him many accolades and nominations, including one for the Academy Award for Best Picture at the 90th Academy Awards. He earned another nomination for the award the following year for BlacKkKlansman. His latest film, Us, was released on March 22, 2019.

He is a principal at production companies Darko Entertainment and QC Entertainment.

== Filmography ==
Producer

- 1997: Visceral Matter
- 2001: Donnie Darko
- 2006: Southland Tales
- 2009: I Hope They Serve Beer in Hell
- 2009: The Box
- 2009: World's Greatest Dad
- 2010: Operation: Endgame
- 2011: God Bless America
- 2013: Bad Words
- 2013: Hell Baby
- 2013: Jimi: All Is by My Side
- 2015: Home Sweet Hell
- 2016: Happy Birthday
- 2016: Pride and Prejudice and Zombies
- 2017: Get Out
- 2018: BlacKkKlansman
- 2018: The Oath
- 2019: Us
- 2020: Antebellum
- 2023: It Lives Inside
- TBA: Casket Girls

Executive producer

- 2016: Green is Gold
- 2017: Band Aid
- 2018: A Futile and Stupid Gesture
- 2018: Time Freak
