= Lisa K. Wyatt =

American actress & comedian

- Education: St. Olaf College (BA)
- Occupations: Actress, comedian
- Years active: 1997–present
- Website: www.lisakwyatt.com

Lisa K. Wyatt is an American actress and comedian. According to the biography on her official site, she has appeared in more than 150 film, television and regional theatre credits. In the fifth season of The Office, she appeared as Lynne, the love interest of Kevin Malone.

== Education ==
Wyatt graduated magna cum laude from St. Olaf College in Northfield, Minnesota, with a BA degree in theatre and math.

== Career ==
Wyatt has appeared in the films Legally Blonde (2001), Donnie Darko (2001), American Dreamz (2006) and Mr. Woodcock (2007). She had a supporting role in Southland Tales (2006), which premiered at the Cannes Film Festival in 2006. The film was directed by Richard Kelly, who previously directed Wyatt in Donnie Darko. The role of Terri Riley, a soccer mom who becomes a revolutionary, was written specifically for Wyatt.

Wyatt had recurring principal roles in the television shows Days of Our Lives and Passions, and has also made appearances in Ugly Betty, My Name Is Earl, The Suite Life on Deck, Six Feet Under, Frasier, Rules of Engagement and Gilmore Girls. Wyatt has also appeared in commercials, done voice-over work and performed stand-up comedy in several comedy clubs in the Los Angeles area. Along with her husband, Jim Blanchette, she coaches other actors in an acting technique called "The Mechanics of Believability" at the Acting Garage in the Van Nuys district of Los Angeles. Wyatt also designs jewelry for her own company, "Lisa K. Wyatt: Jewelry for all Seasons".

Wyatt previously appeared in a recurring role in NBC's The Office as Lynn, the love interest of Kevin Malone. She first appeared in the episode "Blood Drive", where she meets Kevin at a singles party. Wyatt appeared in the supporting role "Rhonda Martin" in The Box, a horror movie released on November 6, 2009, starring Cameron Diaz, James Marsden and Frank Langella.

== Filmography ==
=== Film ===
Year	Title	Role	Notes
1997	Visceral Matter	Desert Princess	
2001	Donnie Darko	Linda Connie	
2001	Legally Blonde	Jail House Guard	
2004	50 Ways to Leave Your Lover	Amanda	
2006	American Dreamz	Aunt Edna	
2006	Southland Tales	Teri Riley	
2007	Mr. Woodcock	Housewife	
2009	The Box	Rhonda Martin	
2009	House Rules for Bad Girls	Nancy	
2010	The Crazies	Peggy Hamill	
2012	K-11	Classification Officer	
2015	Tenured	Holly's Mom	
2016	Internet Famous	Janet Birchbit	
2019	Heavenly Deposit	Casting Director	
2022	Next Exit	Bartender Sam	

=== Television ===
Year	Title	Role	Notes
1997	Second City Headlines & News	Cheryl Smith	24 episodes
1998	Clueless	Madeline	Episode: "The Joint"
1999	ER	Transpo Tech	Episode: "Middle of Nowhere"
1999	Sabrina the Teenage Witch	Aunt Ruby	Episode: "The Good, the Bad and the Luau"
2000	3rd Rock from the Sun	Hannah	Episode: "The Loud Solomon Family: A Dickumentary"
2000	Veronica's Closet	Olivia Cassidy	Episode: "Veronica Loses Her Olive Again"
2001	Popular	Trailer Trash Woman	Episode: "The Shocking Possession of Harrison John"
2001	Frasier	Francine	Episode: "Hooping Cranes"
2001	That's My Bush!	Joyce	Episode: "An Aborted Dinner Date"
2001	FreakyLinks	Mindy	Episode: "Subject: Sunrise at Sunset Streams"
2001	Six Feet Under	Pam, Kroehner Mortician	2 episodes
2001	The Huntress	Mrs. Crandle	Episode: "D&B, Inc."
2001	The Tick	Receptionist	Episode: "The Big Leagues"
2003	The O.C.	Customer	Episode: "The Gamble"
2003	Carnivàle	Minnie	Episode: "After the Ball Is Over"
2004	Strong Medicine	Doris	Episode: "Cinderella in Scrubs"
2004	My Wife and Kids	Bunny	Episode: "Class Reunion"
2004	Gilmore Girls	Madonna Louise	Episode: "Written in the Stars"
2004–2005	Days of Our Lives	Jail Guard / Rita	5 episodes
2006, 2007	My Name Is Earl	Doris	2 episodes
2007	Ugly Betty	Janet, Copy Editor	Episode: "Sofia's Choice"
2007	Big Love	Sister Wife	Episode: "Reunion"
2007	Business Class	Dinah Gretschmer	Television film
2008	The Riches	Caitlin	Episode: "Trust Never Sleeps"
2008	Greek	Helga Von Lempke	Episode: "Move On. Cartwrights"
2008	iCarly	Mrs. Walker	Episode: "iCarly Saves TV"
2009	The Office	Lynn	4 episodes
2010	CSI: Crime Scene Investigation	Ranger Stone	Episode: "Unshockable"
2010, 2011	The Suite Life on Deck	Frankie	2 episodes
2011	Southland	Ms. Williams	Episode: "Code 4"
2011	Rules of Engagement	Instructor	Episode: "The Last of the Red Hat Lovers"
2012	Bones	Lisa Tollison	Episode: "The Crack in the Code"
2012	Shameless	Constance	Episode: "Can I Have a Mother"
2012	Mad Men	Brenda	Episode: "Far Away Places"
2012	General Hospital	Tiny	Episode #1.12566
2012	Prodigy Bully	Teddy's Mom	Television film
2013	Granite Flats	Gladys	3 episodes
2014	The Crazy Ones	Jane	Episode: "Danny Chase Hates Brad Paisley"
2014	Major Crimes	Zelda Lembeck	Episode: "Cutting Loose"
2016	Superstore	Maggie	Episode: "Strike"
2018	UnCorked	Gwen	10 episodes
2021	My Big Fat Blonde Musical	Terri's Mom	Episode: "Greg & Katherine"
