= Holmes Osborne =

American film and television actor

- Born: November 7, 1947 (age 78); Kansas City, Missouri, U.S.
- Occupation: Actor
- Years active: 1976–present

Holmes Osborne (born November 7, 1947) is an American character actor who has worked in film and television, including notable roles in That Thing You Do! (1996), Donnie Darko (2001) and Southland Tales (2007).

== Career ==
Prior to pursuing an acting career, Osborne had jobs as a car salesman and as an English teacher. In 1966 when still a student at the University of Kansas, he began making training videos and short motivational clips that would typically be shown at business events and seminars. By 1996, he had created over 500 of these videos. He acted in live theater but gave it up around 1983 as the wages were insufficient to support his family, with one of his last theater roles being in the musical Blanco! in summer 1983.

In 1996, Osborne played the protagonist's father in the Tom Hanks-directed musical comedy-drama movie That Thing You Do! and had a recurring role in the HBO miniseries From the Earth to the Moon, broadcast in 1998. The following year, he played Gordon LaRiviere in Affliction, filmed during early 1997. Osborne secured the role after submitting an audition tape and did not meet the director until he arrived on set.

In 1999, Osborne was featured in the film Election as the father of two sibling main characters. Later that year he guest starred, along with Lance Henriksen (reprising his role as Frank Black), in an episode of The X-Files as a necromancer for the Millennium Group.

In 2000, Osborne starred as Kirsten Dunst's father in the teen comedy Bring It On. He then starred as Eddie Darko, the main character's father, in the science fiction drama movie Donnie Darko. He lauded director Richard Kelly's "spontaneity" on set.

In 2001 Osborne appeared in the film Domestic Disturbance as the Shady Tree Motel clerk with Steve Buscemi, John Travolta, and Vince Vaughn.

In 2003, Osborne appeared in the family comedy Cheaper By the Dozen and the mystery thriller Identity.

In 2004, Osborne co-starred in the comedy movie Anchorman: The Legend of Ron Burgundy.

In 2006, Osborne appeared as the main villain in the Disney movie Air Buddies.

In 2007, Osborne reunited with Donnie Darko director Richard Kelly on the political satire Southland Tales, and again in 2009 on the psychological thriller The Box. Also in 2009, he co-starred in the comedy movie All About Steve.

In 2011, Osborne had a supporting role in the Tom Hanks movie Larry Crowne. He has made appearances on television series such as House M. D., Cold Case, CSI: Miami, Rules of Engagement, Dharma & Greg, and had a recurring role on the ABC science fiction series Invasion.

== Personal life ==
Osborne is married to Candace and in 1996, reportedly lived in the same house where he grew up. He is an avid fisherman.
