= Southland Tales: The Prequel Saga =

Collection of graphic novel by Richard Kelly

- Date: October 15, 2007
- Series: Southland Tales: The Prequel Saga
- Publisher: Graphitti Designs

Creative team
- Writers: Richard Kelly
- Artists: Brett Weldele
- ISBN: 0936211806

Southland Tales: The Prequel Saga is a collection of three graphic novels produced to accompany the 2006 feature film Southland Tales. The graphic novels were written by the film's screenwriter-director Richard Kelly and illustrated by Brett Weldele. The collection was published by Graphitti Designs.

== Concept and development ==
The graphic novels featured are the first half of the Southland Tales story. The film itself relates the second part.

Southland Tales, in its entirety, was conceived as a nine part "interactive experience". The first six parts would have appeared as six 100-page graphic novels released in a six-month period leading up to the film's release in 2007. The feature film comprises the final three parts of the experience. A website was also developed to interweave the narratives of the graphic novels and film. The planned six graphic novels were reduced to three.

Two Roads Diverge, Fingerprints and The Mechanicals make up the three published graphic novels.
