= Golden Ticket (The Office) =

- The Office episode
- Episode no.: Season 5 Episode 19
- Directed by: Randall Einhorn
- Written by: Mindy Kaling
- Cinematography by: Matt Sohn
- Editing by: Claire Scanlon
- Production code: 519
- Original air date: March 12, 2009

Guest appearances
- Andy Buckley as David Wallace; Lisa K. Wyatt as Lynn

Episode chronology
← Previous "Blood Drive"	Next → "New Boss"
- The Office (American season 5)

"Golden Ticket" is the nineteenth episode of the fifth season of the television series The Office and the 91st overall episode of the series. It originally aired on NBC in the United States on March 12, 2009.

In the episode, Michael excitedly starts a Willy Wonka-inspired promotional gimmick providing discounts to customers who receive golden tickets, then tries to blame the idea on Dwight when the promotion appears to cost the company a large amount of money. In a B story, Kevin receives conflicting romantic advice from Andy, Jim and Pam.

The episode was written by Mindy Kaling and directed by Randall Einhorn. It received mixed reviews from critics, and many criticized the selfishness and mean behavior of Michael Scott in the episode. According to Nielsen ratings, "Golden Ticket" was watched by 7.7 million overall viewers the week it aired.

== Synopsis ==
Inspired by the film Willy Wonka & the Chocolate Factory, branch manager Michael Scott decides to put five "golden tickets" randomly into five different boxes of paper that will provide Dunder Mifflin clients with a ten percent discount for one year. Michael is excited about the promotional gimmick, which prompts him to dress and act like Willy Wonka. However, because Michael distributed all the tickets on the same day in the same small area of the warehouse, all five golden tickets go to their biggest client, the Blue Cross of Pennsylvania; because Michael did not specify "limit one per customer", the company is owed a fifty percent discount. As a result, the Scranton branch is expected to lose a significant amount of revenue which could shut down the branch. When Chief Financial Officer David Wallace demands to know who is responsible, Michael claims Dwight Schrute thought of the idea. Michael convinces Dwight to take the fall, insisting that Michael needs the job more than Dwight.

David Wallace comes to the Scranton branch and says the client was so pleased with the discount that they made the company their exclusive provider of office supplies. Grateful, David congratulates Dwight for the idea, and Dwight accepts the credit. Michael is shocked and upset. The rest of the office, still angry at Michael for his near-disastrous idea, play along with Wallace's misunderstanding and congratulate Dwight. David sets up a conference call with the marketing department so Dwight can explain his golden ticket promotion. Michael interrupts and goads Dwight into revealing the idea actually came from Michael. As Michael and Dwight bicker, a frustrated David leaves the office, appearing indifferent about the outcome.

Kevin Malone seeks advice on how to start a relationship with Lynn, the woman he socialized with at the Valentine's Day singles mixer (from the episode "Blood Drive"). Andy Bernard, still upset from his broken engagement with Angela Martin, suggests that Kevin be mean to Lynn, providing only backhanded compliments and ignoring her calls. Jim Halpert suggests he ask her out, but not immediately. Pam Beesly suggests he ask her out immediately and not be afraid to express himself to her. When Lynn visits the office, Kevin tells her his thoughts directly, saying that she has a nice smile and he would like to take her out to dinner and a movie. She accepts. Kevin then accidentally says "Nice...boobs", but Lynn seems flattered by the statement.

== Production ==
The official The Office website included three cut scenes from "Golden Ticket". One 72-second clip includes Michael eavesdropping from the men's bathroom on Angela, Oscar, Kelly and Meredith, who discuss how unfairly Michael is treating Dwight in making him take the fall over the failed golden ticket promotion. Kelly also makes the remark, "I hope Dwight gets fired and they get a hot new guy to replace him," to which Oscar replies, "Seriously." In another 52-second scene, Michael asks Dwight to go on a stroll, but Dwight suggests turning it into a "power stroll", which he prepares Michael for by applying sunscreen to his face. And in a follow-up to the scene where workers discuss that Michael should be fired, a visibly angry and upset Michael confronts the office. When he says "Can any of you imagine this office without me?" everyone gleefully raises their hands, but Michael then asks them if they've thought about what kind of terrible person they could get to replace him; he then pointedly says that they could get someone who knows they don't actually need three accountants (Oscar, Kevin and Angela look visibly ashamed that Michael knew this going back to season 2's "Halloween" episode but has never taken any action about it) or someone who doesn't approve of romantic relationships and would transfer one or both people to separate branches (Jim and Pam in turn get this message and look chastened), and tells the office that they should mind what they're saying about him "when I'm hiding in the bathroom pretending to be pooping."

The NBC site also featured more than two minutes' worth of clips involving the subplot between Kevin and Lynne, including Andy discussing his new method of being mean to women while courting dates, in response to his recent failed engagement with Angela. Among the deleted scenes are Kevin telling Lynn he will be too busy for three weeks to talk to her and giving a backhanded compliment to her shirt, both at Andy's suggestion.

== Cultural references ==
The golden ticket promotional gimmick, from which the episode receives its title, is a reference to the golden tickets from the 1964 Roald Dahl novel, Charlie and the Chocolate Factory, as well as the 1971 and 2005 film adaptations of the book. Throughout the first half of the episode, Michael wears a purple suit and top hat similar to Willy Wonka, the character responsible for the promotion from which this episode takes its name. Blue Cross of Pennsylvania, the Dunder Mifflin client who receives the golden tickets, is a real-life division of Blue Cross and Blue Shield Association, an American health insurance company. After throwing away the Willy Wonka outfit, Michael wears a gray T-shirt advertising the Wilkes-Barre/Scranton Pioneers, a minor-league arena football team. One of the excuses Michael uses to avoid David's phone calls is that he is attending an "Obama fashion show", a reference to U.S. President Barack Obama and First Lady Michelle Obama.

Dwight Schrute makes knock-knock jokes involving the KGB, the secret police and intelligence agency for the Soviet Union. Michael also makes a knock-knock joke involving Buddha, with the punch-line that Pam "buttah" (butter, pronounced like Buddha) a slice of bread. Gautama Buddha was a spiritual teacher in the South Asian country Nepal who founded the religion Buddhism. During an office meeting in which Michael asks his employees to come up with other golden ticket-like ideas, Andy suggests the breakfast cereal brand Golden Grahams and American sitcom The Golden Girls before confessing he does not understand the assignment.

== Reception ==
In its original American broadcast on March 12, 2009, "Golden Ticket" was watched by 7.7 million overall viewers and received a Nielsen rating of 4.1 among adults aged between 18 and 49, despite directly competing with ABC's Grey's Anatomy and CBS's CSI: Crime Scene Investigation. For the week of March 9–15, the episode ranked number 10 among adults 18–49, within two shares of the time-period lead in that age group. "Golden Ticket" was number four among all programs in adults 18–34, behind Grey's Anatomy and the Tuesday and Wednesday editions of American Idol. In the 9 to 9:30 p.m. time slot, the episode also ranked number one among men 18–34 and men 18–49, tied with Grey's Anatomy for number one among the broadcast networks in adults 18–34, and tied with CSI for number two among adults 18–49.

"What's the worst thing Michael Scott has ever done? Not the most embarrassing, dumbest, most offensive, or most self-defeating action. We mean the cruelest, most selfish, most venal thing he's ever done. ... Michael has always been vain and deluded, but we've never been asked to think of him as truly bad. But this episode comes awfully close to doing that."

— Will Leitch, New York magazine

"Golden Ticket" received mixed reviews, with several reviewers criticizing the selfish and mean behavior of Michael. In a New York magazine article entitled "Michael Finally Goes Too Far", Will Leitch describes it as "one of the funnier recent episodes", but found Michael's willingness to sell out Dwight unsettling: "Usually, when he's about to do something over-the-top (like plant drugs on Toby), he backs off at the last second. This time, he's willing to go all the way and sell out Dwight, his most loyal friend. It's a little jarring." Leitch, however, said the sweetness of the subplot involving Kevin and Lynne offset some of the darker aspects of the episode, and praised several of the jokes including Michael's "Shoe-La-La" shoe store idea, Dwight's idea for a "Horse Boat" invention and the KGB knock-knock jokes.

Kona Gallagher, of TV Squad, praised "Golden Ticket", especially the final act: "Between Michael's face and Dwight's conference call, the last ten minutes of this episode were absolutely golden." Gallagher said the episode returned to "season one levels of Michael Scott stupidity", and particularly liked the way Dwight so readily accepted credit once the golden ticket promotion proved to be a success. Nathan Rabin of The A.V. Club gave "Golden Ticket" an A− grade and particularly praised Steve Carell's Willy Wonka impression and the way Michael tried to distance himself after the promotional idea went bad. Rabin said, "Tonight's episode lacked a certain gravity but it delivered the goods, comedy-wise." He also pointed out that the script was technically illogical in that Michael pretended he did not come up with the golden ticket idea despite the documentary camera crew filming his earlier discussions about it.

Entertainment Weekly writer Whitney Pastorek described the episode as "kind of cute tonight, and kind of flat in places, and kind of sad." Pastorek said one of the most interesting aspects of "Golden Ticket" was the relationship between Michael and Dwight: "After their respective failed romances with Holly and Angela, Michael and Dwight may be coming to the awkward realization that the most successful relationship in either of their lives is with one another, and that may be causing a little tension." Travis Fickett of IGN said "Golden Ticket" was a "solid offering", but felt it lacked any big moments and fit too much of a status quo mold he feels other recent episodes had fallen into. Fickett said it was "fun to watch Michael squirm" both when he thought he was in trouble, and when he was robbed credit for his good idea; he also liked when Jim encouraged Dwight not to take the fall for Michael, and when the others in the office rallied around Dwight when David Wallace gave Dwight credit for the success.

Alan Sepinwall, television writer for The Star-Ledger, said Michael acted so "nakedly selfish and unfeeling" that it made the episode unpleasant to watch: "If last week's 'Blood Drive' gave us Michael at his most human and sympathetic, then 'Golden Ticket' showed how a human Michael could also be a monster." However, Sepinwall said he did think the subplot involving Kevin receiving romantic advice was funny and sweet: "Brian Baumgartner's just been aces the last two weeks, and if it hadn't been for this story, I might have found 'Golden Ticket' unbearable." Dan Hopper of VH1's Best Week Ever strongly criticized the episode and the behavior of the characters: "Why was every single character on last night's Willy Wonka episode acting like a complete idiot? Not 'idiot' in the sense that the characters are always dumb and goofy in an amusing way, but 'idiot' as in 'none of these human beings would ever act this way and this is really frustrating to watch?'"

"Golden Ticket" was voted the eleventh-highest-rated episode out of 26 from the fifth season, according to an episode poll at the fansite OfficeTally; the episode was rated 8.33 out of 10.
