= Rohan Chand =

American actor (born 2004)

- Born: July 24, 2004 (age 22); New York City, New York, U.S.
- Occupation: Actor
- Years active: 2011–2018

Rohan Chand (born July 24, 2004) is an American actor. He has appeared in films such as Jack and Jill, Lone Survivor, and Bad Words. He also appeared in the "Crossfire" episode of Homeland. He made a cameo appearance in Jumanji: Welcome to the Jungle in 2017. He starred as Mowgli in the Warner Bros film Mowgli: Legend of the Jungle released on Netflix in 2018.

== Life and career ==
Chand was born in New York City, to parents of Indian descent. When he was six years old, he was spotted by a casting director while playing baseball; the casting director was the mother of another child playing baseball, and encouraged Chand to audition for a role in Adam Sandler's film Jack and Jill. Chand ultimately won the role of Sandler's on-screen adopted son, and the film was released in 2011. His next role was in a 2011 episode of Homeland titled "Crossfire", in which he played Issa Nazir, the young son of the series' central terrorist who forms a close relationship with an American soldier, played by Damian Lewis. In the 2013 film Lone Survivor, Chand played the son of an Afghan who provides assistance to an American Navy SEAL (played by Mark Wahlberg), and spoke in Hindi and Urdu for the part.

In 2013, Chand appeared in a main role in the comedy film Bad Words, playing Chaitanya Chopra, a spelling bee entrant who befriends the film's main character (played by Jason Bateman) after auditioning when he was eight years old. He was ten years old by the time of the film's release and his performance was widely praised by critics, with a writer for Variety magazine predicting that Chand would receive "many more big screen opportunities following this endearingly wide-eyed turn". His next project was the 2014 film The Hundred-Foot Journey directed by Lasse Hallström and starring Helen Mirren, in which he played the young version of the film's main character (played by Manish Dayal).

Chand was cast in Andy Serkis' Mowgli: Legend of the Jungle, in the leading role of Mowgli. The film was released in November 2018.

== Filmography ==
=== Films ===
| Year | Title | Role | Notes |
|---|---|---|---|
| 2011 | Jack and Jill | Gary Sadelstein | |
| 2013 | Lone Survivor | Gulab's Young Son | |
| 2013 | Bad Words | Chaitanya Chopra | |
| 2014 | The Hundred-Foot Journey | Young Hassan Haji | |
| 2017 | Jumanji: Welcome to the Jungle | Boy at Bazaar | |
| 2018 | Mowgli: Legend of the Jungle | Mowgli | |

=== Television ===
| Year | Title | Role | Notes |
|---|---|---|---|
| 2011 | Homeland | Issa Nazir | Season 1, Episode 9: "Crossfire" |
