= Blood Drive (The Office) =

- The Office episode
- Episode no.: Season 5 Episode 18
- Directed by: Randall Einhorn
- Written by: Brent Forrester
- Cinematography by: Matt Sohn
- Editing by: Michael Zurer
- Production code: 518
- Original air date: March 5, 2009

Guest appearances
- Katie Aselton as Glove Girl; Rob Brownstein as Salesman; Hugh Dane as Hank Tate; Bobby Ray Shafer as Bob Vance; Lisa K. Wyatt as Lynn

Episode chronology
← Previous "Lecture Circuit"	Next → "Golden Ticket"
- The Office (American season 5)

"Blood Drive" is the eighteenth episode of the fifth season of the American comedy television series The Office and the 90th overall episode of the series. It originally aired on NBC in the United States on March 5, 2009.

In the episode, a lonely Michael strikes up a pleasant conversation with a woman while giving blood, but passes out before he can learn her name. He holds a Valentine's Day singles party at the Dunder Mifflin office with the hopes of meeting her. Meanwhile, Jim and Pam go on an awkward double date with Phyllis and Bob Vance.

The episode was written by Brent Forrester and directed by Randall Einhorn. It featured the first appearance of actress Lisa K. Wyatt as Lynn, who would make recurrent appearances as a love interest for Kevin. The episode received generally mixed reviews and, according to Nielsen ratings, was watched by 8.63 million viewers during its original broadcast.

== Plot ==
Michael Scott is depressed because it is the first Valentine's Day since he and Holly Flax broke up. Michael donates blood at a mobile blood drive being held in Dunder Mifflin's parking lot and has a nice conversation with a female donor laying next to him. When they both finish at the same time, Michael passes out because he did not eat for three days before giving blood out of nerves, and when he wakes up she is gone. A disappointed Michael finds a glove he assumes she left behind and takes it, hoping she will come back for it. When Michael goes back into the office, he gathers all the single employees into the conference room to discuss their own personal romantic dilemmas. After becoming further depressed by their sad dating stories, Michael tries lifting their spirits by holding a singles mixer. He puts up flyers which also advertise the finding of a missing glove, hoping his mystery woman will come to the party as a result.

Jim Halpert and Pam Beesly receive remarks about their relationship from the rest of the office, who are down due to their own struggling love lives, with Michael threatening them with banishment after they constantly gaze happily on each other. Taking pity on them as a fellow coupled person, Phyllis Vance invites them to have lunch with her and her husband Bob Vance. Their meal initially goes well, but Phyllis and Bob disappear for a while after their food arrives. Hungry and not wanting to be rude by eating before they get back, Jim and Pam check the bathrooms and hear Phyllis and Bob having sex in the disabled stall. Phyllis and Bob finally come back to their table and Jim and Pam lose their appetites and look on in disgust as Phyllis and Bob seductively put food in each other's mouths.

A few outsiders attend Michael's party. One of the attendees strikes up a conversation with Dwight Schrute, who tries to sell her paper; Dwight becomes angry when she tells him she already has a paper supplier. Another attendee named Lynn converses with Kevin Malone, who is still somewhat depressed over his breakup with his fiancée Stacy and walks away when he admits it was she who broke it off. Kevin returns later to apologize to Lynn and admits he gets nervous talking to pretty girls; Lynn is flattered and gives Kevin her e-mail address. Afterwards, Michael is disappointed the woman who lost her glove does not show up and tells the employees they can go home early, but the empathetic staff decide to stay, and encourage Michael to leave with them when she doesn't arrive.

Stanley Hudson attempts to get a cookie from a blood drive nurse at the drive by claiming he gave blood earlier and showing a cotton ball taped to his arm as proof. The nurse recognizes he is lying because they are using band-aids; a frustrated Stanley leaves, and tells Phyllis, who is about to try the same trick. Creed Bratton leaves the blood mobile with a bag of donated blood in his coat pocket.

== Production ==
"Blood Drive" was written by Brent Forrester and directed by Randall Einhorn. It featured the first appearance of actress Lisa K. Wyatt as Lynne, who would continue to make frequent appearances as a romantic interest for Kevin. During the episode, the Ed Helms character Andy is described as attending solo honeymoons in Napa Valley, The Bahamas and Walt Disney World Resort, which he previously booked before breaking off his engagement with Angela. Following the episode, NBC posted fake photos of Ed Helms visiting those locations on the show's official Angela Martin and Andrew Bernard wedding website. The photos included Helms scuba-diving, standing in front of a hot air balloon and visiting Disney's Epcot Center, and includes an assurance by Andy that he "wanted all my bros and bras in cyberspace to know that the Ol' Nard Dog is doing just fine.”

The official website for The Office included three cut scenes from "Blood Drive" within a week of its original release. In the first 85-second clip, Dwight assures his office-mates that the blood taken in the bloodmobile will not be used in any "ritualistic ways". Later, while giving blood himself, he asks the hospital employee, "How do I know it's not going to go into a person who will later come back to kill me?" The second clip was two minutes of extended footage from the singles party. Meredith talks about her husband leaving her for a garbage-woman whom her kids now consider their real mother instead of herself, and Dwight said he believes his soulmate, "probably died 700 years ago in feudal Japan after having impersonated a samurai, or at the very least she lives somewhere outside the Scranton Wilkes-Barre corridor." In the final 90-second clip, Dwight shows off his bobblehead doll collection to a woman, Creed tries unsuccessfully to pick up Lynne, and Dwight gets rid of an attractive male visitor who Michael fears could be competition. Dwight tells him the party is cancelled "due to a death in the elevator".

== Cultural references ==
During the singles party, Angela mentions that two men previously had a duel over her in Ohio, which is the second duel fought over her. This is a reference to "The Duel", an Office episode from earlier in the fifth season, in which Andy and Dwight duel for her affections in the Dunder Mifflin parking lot. In the beginning of the "Blood Drive" episode, Jim, Pam, Michael and Dwight drive a phone salesman away by repeatedly saying "Ayyyy!" in the style of Fonzie, the popular character from the sitcom Happy Days. The mysterious woman leaves a single pink glove behind after meeting Michael, in a similar fashion to the classic folk tale Cinderella. Kelly refers to the encounter as "like a modern-day Enchanted". Michael says he was hit by "Cupid's sparrow", a mistaken reference to the Roman mythological god who would inspire love by shooting people with arrows.

Michael makes jokes about feeling like a human juice box, describing himself as "Type O-Cean Spray", a combination of type O blood and the Ocean Spray juice company, and as "Hawaiian Blood Punch", a reference to the fruit punch drink Hawaiian Punch. Jim says, "I have a lot of work to do this afternoon. Those mines aren't going to sweep themselves," a reference to the computer game Minesweeper. Ryan is said to be "sleeping with random prostitutes" in Thailand; prostitution in the Southeast Asian nation is technically illegal, but is in practice tolerated and regulated. Kevin said his previous engagement ended immediately after he remarked that the Philadelphia Eagles, a National Football League football team, might have a chance at winning the NFC East division championship.

== Reception ==
In its original American broadcast on March 5, 2009, "Blood Drive" was watched by 8.63 million overall viewers, which was about average for the series at the time. The episode received a 5.1 rating/14 share among viewers aged between 18 and 34, and a 4.5 rating/11 share among viewers between 18 and 49. The episode of 30 Rock, which aired at 9:30 p.m. directly after The Office, was seen by 7.35 million viewers, an increase of 30 percent in viewership from the previous week's 6.3 million. Commentators said "Blood Drive" was directly responsible for this ratings increase for 30 Rock because the lead-in Office episode was new, whereas the previous week's episode was a repeat.

The episode received generally mixed reviews. Brian Howard of The Journal News described it as "classic Office" and praised the camaraderie the staff showed for each other and the "bizarre discomfort" of the double date with Jim, Pam, Phyllis and Bob. Howard described Dwight and Kevin as the episode's stand-outs. Alan Sepinwall of The Star-Ledger said the episode lacked many laugh-out-loud moments, but was effective because the characters are so well developed: "The Office has, over the years, become as much of a kitchen sink drama as it is a comedy. ... The characters are so well-drawn by now, and for the most part so likable, that a sweet, low-key episode about Michael and the staff bonding over their singlehood worked even without a lot of memorable jokes." Travis Fickett of IGN described the episode as "familiar territory, but it has plenty of fun moments." Fickett praised the scene with Carell and the mystery woman, and Jim and Pam's lunch. But Fickett said the series needed to address why Pam was staying with the company: "Jim and Pam still work there because, well, that's part of the show – but there really isn't a very good reason as to why these two would still be at this dead end job."

Will Leitch of New York magazine described "Blood Drive" as "mostly a placeholder episode", although he said it was "legitimately touching" when the cast stays late with Michael during the party. Nathan Rabin of The A.V. Club, who gave the episode a B+ grade, said the episode included both pathos and "big laughs". He particularly liked the joke of Andy attending all his honeymoons: "The thought of Andy forlornly embarking on a couple's massage solo or sharing a romantic hot-air balloon ride with himself was funny and sad in the best Office tradition." Entertainment Weekly writer Jeff Labrecque said the episode was "unusually sweet", but said the double date with Pam, Jim, Phyllis and Bob "felt slightly undercooked". Josh McAuliffe of The Times-Tribune of Scranton, Pennsylvania, said the episode was "a highly amusing, if not fantastic, half-hour" and particularly praised the opening scene involving the phone system salesman.

Several reviewers described Dwight's quote, "I can retract my penis up into itself," as the most memorable line of the episode. Phyllis and Bob Vance's sexual rendezvous in the handicapped restroom during the double date ranked number 8 in phillyBurbs.com's top ten moments from the fifth season of The Office. "Blood Drive" was voted the seventeenth-highest-rated episode out of 26 from the fifth season, according to an episode poll at the fansite OfficeTally; the episode was rated 7.86 out of 10.
