= Home Sweet Hell =

- Theatrical release poster
- Directed by: Anthony Burns
- Written by: Carlo Allen; Ted Elrick; Tom Lavagnino
- Produced by: A. J. Buckley; Anthony Burns; Jeff Culotta; Sean McKittrick
- Starring: Katherine Heigl; Patrick Wilson; Jordana Brewster; Kevin McKidd; A. J. Buckley; Chi McBride; Jim Belushi
- Cinematography: David Hennings
- Production companies: Darko Entertainment; Passcode Entertainment; Stage 6 Films; Donnybrook 4 Productions
- Distributed by: Vertical Entertainment
- Release date: March 13, 2015
- Running time: 98 minutes
- Country: United States
- Language: English
- Budget: $5 million

Home Sweet Hell (originally known as North of Hell) is a 2015 American black comedy thriller film directed by Anthony Burns and written by Carlo Allen, Ted Elrick and Tom Lavagnino. The film stars Katherine Heigl, Patrick Wilson, Jordana Brewster, Kevin McKidd, A. J. Buckley, Chi McBride, and Jim Belushi. Some critics criticized some pseudo-sexual scenes and lacking sensuality.

On February 3, 2015, the film was released on video on demand before being theatrically released on March 13.

== Plot ==
Don Champagne runs a successful furniture business. His detail-oriented wife Mona has everything planned according to the book of her goals. One day an attractive young woman named Dusty applies for a sales job at Don's store. Goaded on by his long-time employee Les, Don hires Dusty.

Don is desperate because of his poor sex life with his wife. Shortly, Dusty seduces him and they start having an affair. Later, Dusty shows up at the birthday party of Don and Mona's son Andrew, telling Don that she is pregnant and wants to keep the baby. Don is desperate, and Les advises him to pay Dusty money.

It is then revealed that Dusty has been lying to Don about her pregnancy. She is the abused girlfriend of Murphy, the leader of a gang of low-life criminals running violent and even murderous extortion schemes. Don offers Dusty $13,000 for her silence, which she refuses, telling Don it will not be enough. Don is unsure whether Dusty will keep her mouth shut, and Les advises Don to tell Mona the truth before hearing it from Dusty. Don confesses to Mona, and she demands that Don kill Dusty.

Murphy is not satisfied with the $13,000, so Dusty calls Don and demands $25,000. Don agrees, but he and Mona prepare to poison Dusty instead. Dusty shows up for the money and swallows the poisoned drink. Don and Mona put an unconscious Dusty in the car and take her home. Once home, Dusty wakes up, so Mona kills her with a hammer. Mona hacks Dusty's body into pieces, buries it in the garden, and reveals to Don that Dusty wasn't even pregnant.

Discovering Dusty is missing and suspecting that something is wrong, Murphy and his accomplices Freeman and Benji attack Les. Murphy also threatens Don by leaving his son a letter, in which he demands a meeting at a strip club. Don meets Murphy and his gang and convinces them that Dusty left for Dallas after he paid her. Murphy threatens to rape his family if he does not pay him $20,000 the next day.

Don and Mona dig up Dusty's corpse and go to the place where the gang lives. While Mona is trying to hide Dusty's body parts in the freezer, Freeman comes home with his girlfriend. Mona mortally wounds Freeman, stabs and kills his girlfriend, and shortly calls the police to report a disturbance at the house. Before dying, Freeman calls Murphy and tells him what happened. Murphy and Benji arrive and find Freeman and his girlfriend dead. Murphy also discovers parts of Dusty in the freezer and realizes he was set up. Soon the police arrive and find Murphy and Benji at the crime scene. The police shoot Benji while Murphy escapes. The police decided that Murphy and Benji were responsible for the murders.

While alone, Don asks Mona why she is so cold-blooded and if it was due to her upbringing. Mona threatens to kill him if he ever asks her that question again. The next day, Don finds the neighbor's dog dead in his freezer at a house party, and Mona displays very antisocial behavior with their guests. Terrified, Don stages an accident to kill Mona. After her death, Don and his children move to a new house and are seen in the driveway getting into a new car and driving away. The movie ends with Murphy going after their car. The screen turns black, and the end credits roll. Two shots are heard, followed by a prolonged honk and children's screams, implying that Murphy had killed Don.

== Cast ==
- Patrick Wilson as Don Champagne
- Katherine Heigl as Mona Champagne
- Jordana Brewster as Dusty
- Kevin McKidd as Freeman
- Jim Belushi as Les
- A. J. Buckley as Murphy
- Heath Freeman as Benji
- Bryce Johnson as Lanny Kelso
- Jamie Ourso as Big Daddy
- Alyshia Ochse as Kaysi
- Madison Wolfe as Allison Champagne
- Aiden Flowers as Andrew Champagne
- Artie Baxter as Mark
- Johnny Hawkes as Stu
- Eva Rivera-Ferrell as Andre's Wife
- Brandi Nicole Wilson as Abby
- Yohance Myles as Andre
- Catherine Ashton as Lynn
- Chi McBride as Police Officer

== Production ==
=== Casting ===
On March 26, 2013, it was reported that Katherine Heigl and Patrick Wilson had signed on for Darko Entertainment's dark comedy North of Hell. The storyline revolves around a well-to-do businessman (played by Wilson), who is used to having things his own way, but appears to be helpless at the hands of his domineering wife (played by Heigl). "I play a very dark person, which is out of my wheelhouse," says Heigl. On May 3, 2013, Deadline announced that Jordana Brewster had been cast as a sexy hire at Wilson's character's work who seduces and blackmails him, threatening to go to his wife with their affair.

The film also stars Kevin McKidd, of Grey's Anatomy. "Gotta say North of Hell cast and crew look pretty awesome! Be warned, I don't look like myself in this movie—in a bad/good way", he was reported saying on Twitter.

On September 30, 2014, the first trailer was released and revealed that the film's new title was Home Sweet Hell.

=== Filming ===
Filming began in May 2013 in New Orleans, Louisiana.

== Reception ==
The film was panned by critics. On Rotten Tomatoes, the film has an approval rating of 5% based on 19 reviews, with an average rating of 3.0/10. The website's critics consensus reads: "Home Sweet Hell mistakes misogyny for subversive wit, aiming for black comedy but ending up with a grueling test of viewer endurance that wastes game efforts from its likable leads." On Metacritic, the film has a weighted average score of 22 out of 100, based on 12 critics, indicating "generally unfavorable" reviews.

=== Accolades ===
The film received one Golden Raspberry Award nomination for Heigl in the Worst Actress category.
