= Southland Tales =

2006 film by Richard Kelly

- Theatrical poster
- Directed by: Richard Kelly
- Written by: Richard Kelly
- Produced by: Sean McKittrick; Bo Hyde; Kendall Morgan; Matthew Rhodes
- Starring: Dwayne Johnson; Seann William Scott; Sarah Michelle Gellar; Nora Dunn; Christopher Lambert; John Larroquette; Bai Ling; Jon Lovitz; Mandy Moore; Holmes Osborne; Cheri Oteri; Amy Poehler; Lou Taylor Pucci; Miranda Richardson; Wallace Shawn; Kevin Smith; Justin Timberlake
- Cinematography: Steven Poster
- Edited by: Sam Bauer
- Music by: Moby
- Production companies: Universal Pictures; Cherry Road Films; Darko Entertainment; MHF Zweite Academy Film; Inferno Distribution; Eden Roc Productions; Persistent Entertainment; Wild Bunch
- Distributed by: Samuel Goldwyn Films; Destination Films (United States); Universal Pictures; Wild Bunch; Inferno Distribution (International)
- Release dates: May 21, 2006 (Cannes); November 14, 2007 (United States)
- Running time: 144 minutes
- Countries: United States; Germany
- Language: English
- Budget: $17 million
- Box office: $374,743

Southland Tales is a 2006 dystopian black comedy thriller film written and directed by Richard Kelly. It features an ensemble cast that includes Dwayne Johnson, Seann William Scott, Sarah Michelle Gellar, Mandy Moore, and Justin Timberlake. An international co-production of the United States and Germany, the film is set in the then-near future of 2008, and is a portrait of Los Angeles, as well as a satiric commentary on the military–industrial complex and the infotainment industry. The title refers to the Southland, a name used by locals to refer to the Greater Los Angeles area. Original music was provided by Moby.

Southland Tales premiered at the 2006 Cannes Film Festival, and was released theatrically in the United States on November 14, 2007. The film polarised critics, who responded unfavourably to its running time and sprawling nature in spite of its "intriguing vision", and only made $374,743 during its international theatrical run. It has developed a cult following in subsequent years. Kelly has expressed interest in expanding the film into a franchise.

== Plot ==
On July 4, 2005, twin nuclear attacks destroy El Paso and Abilene, Texas. The catastrophic event triggers World War III, prompting the U.S. government to reinstate the draft and establish US-IDENT, a draconian mass surveillance agency. Amidst a global fuel crisis, the German company Treer creates "Fluid Karma," an inexhaustible energy generator driven by ocean currents. Treer's lead scientist, Baron Von Westphalen, secretly plans to use this technology for world domination.

In 2008 Los Angeles, right-wing action star Boxer Santaros awakens with amnesia. He forgets his marriage to Madeline Frost—daughter of Senator and Vice-Presidential candidate Bobby Frost—and starts an affair with psychic ex-porn star Krysta Now. Meanwhile, a Neo-Marxist underground plots to destabilize the government and US-IDENT. They coerce the amnesiac Boxer into participating in a staged police brutality incident. The plan involves identical twins: police officer Roland Taverner, whom they have kidnapped, and his brother Ronald. The Neo-Marxists intend to frame Ronald, dressed in his brother's uniform, for murdering two activists. However, a rogue cop interferes and actually murders the activists. Krysta accidentally leaks a video of the incident, sparking massive city-wide riots.

As Los Angeles descends into anarchy, the city's elite gather on Von Westphalen's Mega-Zeppelin to celebrate the global launch of Fluid Karma. Aboard the ship, scientists reveal to Boxer that Treer's experiments have created a rift in the space-time continuum. Boxer is actually his own future self, having traveled back in time, while his past self died. The scientists warn that if two identical souls make physical contact, it will trigger an apocalyptic cataclysm. Furthermore, Roland and Ronald are not twins, but the exact same person coexisting from different timelines.

On the ground, armed rioters storm US-IDENT headquarters. During the chaos, Roland and Ronald find each other and grasp hands. Their physical contact causes them, along with a nearby vehicle, to levitate as a massive time rift opens in the sky. Above them, an anti-draft insurgent fires a heat-seeking missile at the zeppelin, destroying it and killing Boxer and the elites aboard. As the cataclysm begins, Iraq War veteran Pilot Abilene narrates that a new age is dawning with Roland as its messiah, concluding with Boxer's earlier realization: "pimps don't commit suicide."

== Cast ==
- Dwayne Johnson as Boxer Santaros, an amnesiac action star whose life crosses paths with Krysta Now. Santaros is married to Madeline Frost Santaros.
- Seann William Scott as Officer Roland Taverner / Private Ronald Taverner, identical twin brothers, one who is a kidnapped U.P.U.2 officer in Hermosa Beach, California, the other who is working for the neo-Marxist group who have told him he kidnapped and drugged his brother.
- Sarah Michelle Gellar as Krysta Now / Krysta Lynn Kapowski, an adult film star who is working on creating a reality show. Gellar met with Kelly and was drawn to the original ideas in his script for Southland Tales.
- Mandy Moore as Madeline Frost Santaros, Boxer Santaros' wife and daughter of Senator Bobby Frost.
- Nora Dunn as Cyndi Pinziki, a porn director and principal member of USIDeath, an organization with plans to destroy US-IDENT.
- Christopher Lambert as Walter Mung, an arms dealer who sells weapons inside an ice cream truck.
- John Larroquette as Vaughn Smallhouse, an advisor to Senator Bobby Frost.
- Bai Ling as Serpentine, the Baron's sultry girlfriend who is seen quite often throughout the film, serving as an ambiguous character that knows more than she lets on.
- Jon Lovitz as Bart Bookman, a violent police officer in love with Zora Carmichaels.
- Holmes Osborne as Senator Bobby Frost, the father of Madeline Frost Santaros and husband of Nana Mae Frost.
- Cheri Oteri as Zora Carmichaels, a Neo-Marxist and Bart Bookman's love interest.
- Amy Poehler as Veronica "Dream" Mung, a Neo-Marxist activist.
- Lou Taylor Pucci as Martin Kefauver, a young man who is drafted into military service for the Iraq War.
- Miranda Richardson as Nana Mae Frost, the ambitious antagonist of the film, Boxer's mother-in-law and the head of US-IDENT.
- Wallace Shawn as Baron von Westphalen, a villain who uses ocean waves to create a source of power. He is the great-grandson of Jenny von Westphalen.
- Kevin Smith as General Simon Theory, a legless Iraq War veteran who works for Baron von Westphalen.
- Justin Timberlake as Private Pilot Abilene, an Iraq War veteran. He narrates the film and also mimes a musical number.

Wood Harris appears as Neo-Marxist activist Dion Element. Zelda Rubinstein, Beth Grant, and Curtis Armstrong portray Dr. Katarina Kuntzler, Dr. Inga Von Westphalen and Dr. Soberin Exx, respectively, all being members of the baron's entourage. Will Sasso plays Fortunio Balducci, while Janeane Garofalo appears as Lieutenant-General Teena MacArthur, whose scenes only appear in the Cannes Cut. Eli Roth cameos as a man who is shot by US-IDENT while on the toilet.

== Production ==
Kelly wrote Southland Tales shortly before the September 11 attacks. The original script involved blackmail, a porn star, and two cops. After the attacks, Kelly revised the script. He said, "[The original script] was more about making fun of Hollywood. But now it's about, I hope, creating a piece of science fiction that's about a really important problem we're facing, about civil liberties and homeland security and needing to sustain both those things and balance them." He described the film as a "tapestry of ideas all related to some of the biggest issues that I think we're facing right now . . . alternative fuel or the increasing obsession with celebrity and how celebrity now intertwines with politics". With the film's premise of a nuclear attack on Texas, Kelly wanted to take a look at how the United States would respond and survive while constructing a "great black comedy."

Kelly's breakthrough film, Donnie Darko, was released in the United States on October 26, 2001, the same day the PATRIOT Act was signed. Two months before Southland Tales was released, he announced the launch of Darko Entertainment.

Kelly said: "[Southland Tales] will only be a musical in a post-modern sense of the word in that it is a hybrid of several genres. There will be some dancing and singing, but it will be incorporated into the story in very logical scenarios as well as fantasy dream environments." Kelly said the film's biggest influences are Kiss Me Deadly, Pulp Fiction, Brazil, and Dr. Strangelove. He called it a "strange hybrid of the sensibilities of Andy Warhol and Philip K. Dick". The film often references religious and literary works; a policeman says, "Flow my tears," in reference to a Philip K. Dick novel of that name. ("Taverner" is the name of the main character in the same book and suffers identity problems of his own.) Pilot Abilene (Justin Timberlake) quotes Biblical scripture from the Book of Revelation in narrating the film and allusion is made both to Robert Frost's The Road Not Taken, Stopping by Woods on a Snowy Evening and an altered version of T. S. Eliot's The Hollow Men.

=== Casting ===
In March 2004, Kelly and Cherry Road Films began development of Southland Tales. Filmmakers entered negotiations with actors Seann William Scott, Sarah Michelle Gellar, Jason Lee, Janeane Garofalo, Tim Blake Nelson, Amy Poehler, Kevin Smith, and Ali Larter. Musician Moby was approached on composing and performing the film's score. Kelly met with Rick Moranis about playing Vaughn Smallhouse. Kelly consciously sought out actors that he felt had been pigeonholed and wanted to showcase their "undiscovered talents."

=== Filming ===
Filming was slated to begin in July 2004, but after a year, it had not begun. Dwayne Johnson joined the cast in April 2005, and principal photography was slated to begin August 1, 2005, in Los Angeles. Filming began on August 15, 2005, with a budget of around US$15–17 million.

=== Post-production ===
Kelly sent the organizers of the 2006 Cannes Film Festival a rough cut of Southland Tales on DVD assuming that it would not be accepted. Much to his surprise, they loved it and wanted the film entered in competition for the Palme d'Or. He stopped editing the film and was also unable to complete all of the visual effects in time for the screening. Kelly's film premiered at the Cannes Film Festival in May 2006 with a length of 160 minutes. Kelly describes the negative reaction at Cannes as a "very painful experience on a lot of levels" but ultimately felt that the film "was better off because of it". After the film's festival release, Southland Tales was purchased by Sony Pictures (via their label Destination Films) and Samuel Goldwyn Films, originally Sony Pictures Classics, Screen Gems and TriStar Pictures were up for US distribution rights.

Universal Studios had originally optioned the U.S. rights, but after the Cannes screening, it was sold to Sony, although Universal still retained studio credit only and some international distribution rights. Kelly sought more financing to finish visual effects for the film, and he negotiated a deal with Sony to cut down on the film's length in exchange for funds to complete the visual effects.

Kelly edited the film down to the basic storylines of the characters portrayed by Scott, Gellar, and Johnson. The director also sought to keep the musical number performed by Timberlake, based on "All These Things That I've Done" by The Killers which he felt was the heart and soul of the film. Editorial changes were made to restructure the order of the film's scenes, including re-recording all of Timberlake's voice-over. The director also added 90 new visual effects shots to the film and removed 20 to 25 minutes of footage from his initial cut.

== Soundtrack ==
Southland Tales: Music from the Motion Picture

Soundtrack album by Moby and various artists
- Released: November 6, 2007
- Genre: Soundtrack
- Label: Milan Records
- Producer: Moby

Moby and various artists chronology
Donnie Darko (2002)	Southland Tales: Music from the Motion Picture (2007)	The Box (2009)

Professional ratings
Review scores
Source	Rating
Allmusic	3.5/5 stars

Southland Tales: Music from the Motion Picture is the original soundtrack of Richard Kelly's 2007 film Southland Tales.

1. "Wave of Mutilation" (UK surf version) by Pixies
2. "Oh My Angel" by Bertha Tillman
3. "Howl" (extended version) by Black Rebel Motorcycle Club
4. "Look Back In" by Moby
5. "Me & Bobby McGee" by Waylon Jennings
6. "Chord Sounds" by Moby
7. "Lucky Me" by Roger Webb
8. "3 Steps" by Moby
9. "Broken Hearted Savior" by Big Head Todd and the Monsters
10. "Teen Horniness Is Not a Crime" by Sarah Michelle Gellar, Abbey McBride and ClarKent
11. "Tiny Elephants" by Moby
12. "Forget Myself" by Elbow
13. "The Star-Spangled Banner" by Rebekah Del Rio & the Section Quartet
14. "Three Days" (live version) by Jane's Addiction
15. "Memory Gospel" by Moby

The soundtrack for Southland Tales was released in stores and online on November 6, 2007. Amongst the songs not available on the soundtrack but featured in the film are Muse's "Blackout", The Killers' "All These Things That I've Done", and Blur's "Tender". Additionally, tracks from Radiohead, Louis Armstrong, Beethoven, Kris Kristofferson, and several tracks from Moby's Hotel:Ambient are likewise absent from the album. The reason for the exclusion of some of these tracks, like the song by The Killers was as a result of a dispute with the record label.

The track "Memory Gospel" was used from time to time by the CBC Radio One program Q in the background of an opening monologue given by host Jian Ghomeshi.

== Release ==
=== Marketing ===
Southland Tales was initially planned to be a nine-part "interactive experience", with the first six parts published in six 100-page graphic novels that would be released in a six-month period up to the film's release. The feature film comprises the final three parts of the experience. A website was also developed to intertwine with the graphic novels and the film itself. The idea of six graphic novels was later cut down to three. The novels were written by Kelly and illustrated by Brett Weldele. Kelly wrote them while making the film and found it very difficult as it pushed him "to the edge of my own sanity", as he remarked in an interview.

- Part One: Two Roads Diverge (May 25, 2006, ISBN 0-936211-75-X)
- Part Two: Fingerprints (September 15, 2006, ISBN 0-936211-76-8)
- Part Three: The Mechanicals (January 31, 2007, ISBN 0-936211-77-6)

They have been collected together into one single volume:

- Southland Tales: The Prequel Saga (360 pages, Graphitti Designs, ISBN 0-936211-80-6)

The titles of the parts in the film are:

- Part Four: Temptation Waits
- Part Five: Memory Gospel
- Part Six: Wave of Mutilation

=== Theatrical release ===
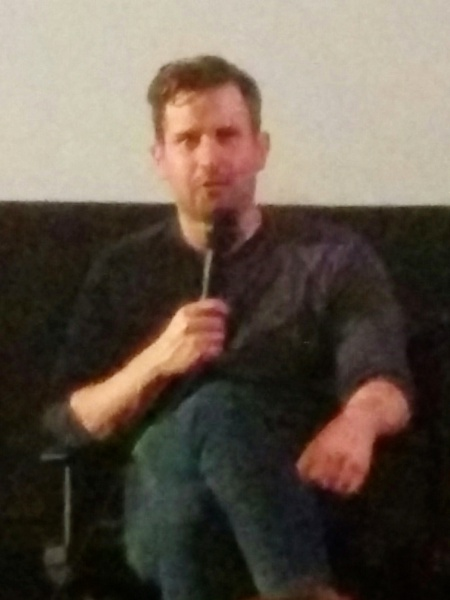
Director Richard Kelly at a screening of Southland Tales

Following its May 21, 2006, premiere at the 2006 Cannes Film Festival, where it was poorly received, the final version of the film premiered at Fantastic Fest on September 22, 2007. The film was originally scheduled to be released in the United States on November 9, 2007, in partnership with Destination Films and Samuel Goldwyn Films, but eventually opened in limited release in California on November 14, 2007. It opened in Canada, as well as nationwide in the United States, in just 63 theaters, on November 16, 2007. The film was released in the UK on December 7, 2007, exclusively to UK cinema chain Cineworld in a limited number of locations.

=== Home media ===
The Region 1 DVD was released on March 18, 2008, in North America and the Region 2 release was on March 31, 2008, in the United Kingdom. The film was released on Region 4 DVD in Australia on April 30, 2008. Special features include a 33-minute documentary USIDent TV: Surveiling the Southland and a 10-minute animated short film This Is the Way the World Ends (which was not included on the R2 and R4 editions). On March 25, 2009, the R2 DVD was released in France.

On September 8, 2008, it was announced that it would be one of the five films released on Blu-ray on November 18, 2008. The only new special feature announced was an audio commentary by Kelly. On October 26, 2020, Arrow Video announced a remastered version approved by Richard Kelly released on Blu-ray on January 26, 2021. This release includes both the original theatrical cut and the Cannes cut.

== Reception ==
=== Cannes Film Festival ===
Along with two other American filmmakers (Sofia Coppola's Marie Antoinette and Richard Linklater's Fast Food Nation), Southland Tales was in competition for the coveted Palme d'Or at the 2006 Cannes Film Festival and was screened on May 21 at the Grand Lumiere Theater.

Many critics responded unfavorably to the film's long running time and sprawling nature. Roger Ebert described the Cannes screening as "The most disastrous since, yes, The Brown Bunny." Salon.com critic Andrew O'Hehir called the Cannes cut "about the biggest, ugliest mess I've ever seen." Jason Solomons, in The Observer (UK), said that "Southland Tales was so bad it made me wonder if [Kelly] had ever met a human being" and that ten minutes of the "sprawling, plotless, post-apocalyptic farrago" gave him the "sinking feeling that this may be one of the worst films ever presented in [Cannes] competition." A handful of the American and European critics, however, were more positive. The Village Voice critic J. Hoberman, for example, called Southland Tales "a visionary film about the end of times" comparable in recent American film only to David Lynch's Mulholland Drive.

=== Critical response ===
41% of 106 reviews compiled by review aggregator Rotten Tomatoes are positive, and the average rating is 4.9 out of 10. The site's consensus states: "Southland Tales, while offering an intriguing vision of the future, remains frustratingly incoherent and unpolished." On Metacritic, the film has a score of 44 out of 100, based on 26 critics, indicating "mixed or average reviews".

Glenn Kenny, in his review for Premiere criticized the film's style, "Kelly's camera placement and framing are at best textbook and at worst calamitously mediocre." In her review for the Los Angeles Times, Carina Chocano wrote, "You get the sense that Kelly is too angry to really find any of it funny. It's easy to empathize with his position, not so easy to remain engrossed in a film that's occasionally inspired but ultimately manic and scattered." David Edelstein's review in New York magazine criticized the film's writing, "Kelly aims high and must have shot off his own ear, which is the only way to account for the dialogue."

On the program Ebert & Roeper, Richard Roeper and guest critic Michael Phillips gave the film a negative review. While Roeper called the film "Two hours and twenty-four minutes of abstract crap," Phillips felt that "the film has a head on its shoulders despite the fact that it can't find any direction" but nevertheless gave the film a thumbs down. In his written review, Ebert gave the film 1 star out of four, stating he admired Kelly as a "cinematic anarchist", but criticized him for having "no sympathy at all for an audience unable to understand his plot", lambasting the narrative and dialogue as incomprehensible.

J. Hoberman defended the film, yet again, in his review for the theatrical cut. "In its willful, self-involved eccentricity, Southland Tales is really something else. Kelly's movie may not be entirely coherent, but that's because there's so much it wants to say." Manohla Dargis also gave the film a positive review in The New York Times, writing, "He doesn't make it easy to love his new film, which turns and twists and at times threatens to disappear down the rabbit hole of his obsessions. Happily, it never does, which allows you to share in his unabashed joy in filmmaking as well as in his fury about the times."

In a 2011 interview, Justin Timberlake himself said, "To me, Southland Tales is performance art. I still don't know what that movie is about." In 2013, Kelly said he considered this work as "the thing that I'm most proud of, and I feel like it's sort of the misunderstood child or the banished child."

=== Box office ===
Southland Tales grossed $275,380 in limited release at the North American box office and $99,363 in Turkey and United Kingdom for a worldwide total of $374,743, against a production budget of $17 million.

== Future ==
In January 2021, Kelly announced that developments are underway to expand the film into a franchise with intention being that the original cast return. The filmmaker explained that the original film is "chapters 4–6", (Note: In allusion to the Star Wars original trilogy (whose entries are labeled IV-VI) having been created and released before the prequel trilogy (whose entries are labeled I-III).) while a prequel project will explore "chapters 1–3" with intentions being to do so through an animation medium, while additional projects can explore events that take place in 2024. He stated that discussions are ongoing as to whether the projects should be released as films or in a long-form format through a streaming service.

== See also ==
- List of American films of 2007
- 99 Francs
- A Scanner Darkly and its film adaptation
