= Bad Words (film) =

2013 film by Jason Bateman

- Theatrical release poster
- Directed by: Jason Bateman
- Written by: Andrew Dodge
- Produced by: Jason Bateman; Jeff Culotta; Sean McKittrick; Mason Novick
- Starring: Jason Bateman; Kathryn Hahn; Rohan Chand; Ben Falcone; Philip Baker Hall; Allison Janney
- Cinematography: Ken Seng
- Edited by: Tatiana S. Riegel
- Music by: Rolfe Kent
- Production companies: Darko Entertainment; Aggregate Films; MXN Entertainment
- Distributed by: Focus Features
- Release dates: September 6, 2013 (TIFF); March 14, 2014 (United States)
- Running time: 89 minutes
- Country: United States
- Language: English
- Budget: $10 million
- Box office: $7.8 million

Bad Words is a 2013 American black comedy film directed by Jason Bateman and written by Andrew Dodge. Marking Bateman's feature film directorial debut, the film stars Bateman as a middle-aged eighth grade dropout who enters the National Golden Quill Spelling Bee through a loophole. It also stars Kathryn Hahn, Rohan Chand, Ben Falcone, Philip Baker Hall, and Allison Janney.

Dodge's screenplay for Bad Words was featured on the 2011 Black List and was shortly thereafter picked up by Bateman. In the original script, the story was set at the Scripps National Spelling Bee, but the name was changed to a fictional bee since the filmmakers did not expect Scripps to allow the use of their name in the film. After two other actors declined to play the main character, Bateman decided to take on the role himself, and cast the other roles by a combination of contacting friends and open casting calls. Filming took place in Los Angeles at the end of 2012.

The film premiered at the 2013 Toronto International Film Festival on September 6, 2013, and had a limited release in the United States on March 14, 2014, expanding to a wide release on March 28. Produced for $10 million, it earned $7.8 million at the theatrical box office. It received mixed reviews from critics: some enjoyed the humor and direction, while others found the main character unlikeable and the humor offensive.

== Plot ==
Forty-year-old misanthrope Guy Trilby discovers a loophole in the Golden Quill Spelling Bee. It stipulates that participants must have not graduated from the eighth grade, allowing him to enter since he dropped out of middle school.

Guy wins a regional spelling bee and progresses to the national competition after confrontations with the parents of children and the spelling bee hosts. He is accompanied by Jenny Widgeon, a journalist hoping to make a story out of his participation in the bee.

On the flight to the national spelling bee, Guy meets Chaitanya Chopra, a 10-year-old entrant in the bee who persistently attempts to befriend him. Upon his arrival in Los Angeles, Guy meets the director of the spelling bee, Dr. Bernice Deagan, who expresses anger at his participation in the bee and arranges for him to stay in a storage closet rather than a regular room.

When Guy learns that Chaitanya is staying in the same hotel, he takes him out to expose him to the wilder side of life. They go stealing food and drinking, and he hires a prostitute to briefly "flash" Chaitanya.

In the bee, Guy tries to distract and disconcert his fellow competitors. At one point he insinuates that he was sleeping with another contestant's mother, and another time he tricks a contestant into thinking that she has gotten her first period by placing ketchup on her chair.

Despite Dr. Deagan's tampering with the word list to give Guy the most difficult words, he spells complicated words with relative ease, impressing and angering both parents and staff at the spelling bee, including the event's founder, Dr. William Bowman. However, the parents petition for his disqualification and the resignation of Deagan.

While researching Guy's background, Jenny discovers that Bowman is Guy's father. She reveals this to him, and he admits that his prime motivation for entering the bee was to embarrass his father in revenge for abandoning him and his mother when he was a child.

Soon before the final stage of the bee, Guy overhears Chaitanya and his father discussing his strategy to win, which is to befriend Guy so that he will allow him to win out of guilt. He ends his friendship with Chaitanya, despite Chaitanya's pleas that he genuinely wanted to be friends. They later sabotage each other: Guy burns Chaitanya's study book, and Chaitanya files a false police report, accusing Guy of kidnapping a young girl.

Meanwhile, ten competitors remain in the bee, and the pool is gradually reduced to just Guy and Chaitanya. When a contestant's mother attacks Guy verbally and is subdued by the police on live television, Bowman is forced to intervene, to his embarrassment.

Having accomplished his goal, Guy decides to let Chaitanya win and deliberately misspells a word. To prove his friendship, Chaitanya also misspells his word, causing them to argue. This escalates into a physical fight, with Chaitanya kicking Guy in his groin. When Bowman attempts to intervene, Chaitanya accidentally hits him with a chair.

Although the bee is briefly halted, Bowman allows it to continue after deciding that Guy and Chaitanya acted in an equally embarrassing manner. Their standoff of deliberately misspelling words continues until Guy intentionally misspells Chaitanya's word so that he corrects him, thus causing Chaitanya to win the bee inadvertently. As Guy leaves, content, Chaitanya offers to give him half the winnings and names him co-winner of the bee.

Guy writes a note to Bowman explaining his actions, which Bowman refuses to read until he reveals himself to be his son, and returns home. He resolves his conflict with Chaitanya by buying an old police car and helping him to chase down his school bullies.

== Cast ==
- Jason Bateman as Guy Trilby
- Kathryn Hahn as Jenny Widgeon
- Rohan Chand as Chaitanya Chopra
- Ben Falcone as Pete Fowler
- Philip Baker Hall as Dr. William Bowman
- Allison Janney as Dr. Bernice Deagan
- Rachael Harris as Mrs. Tai
- Judith Hoag as Petal Dubois
- Beth Grant as Irene
- Patricia Belcher as Ingrid Cole
- Anjul Nigam as Sriram
- Michael Patrick McGill as Beet-Red Father
- Bob Stephenson as Bill Murhoff
- Steve Witting as Proctor
- Greg Cromer as Jeremy
- Ethan Dizon as Ricky Irvine
- Madison Hu as Ling Quan

== Production ==
=== Development ===
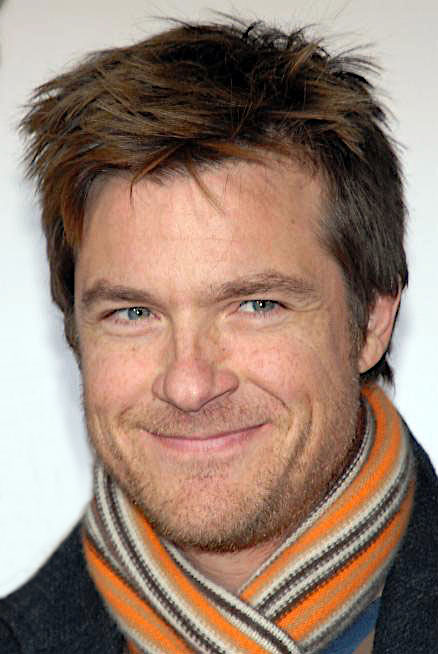
Jason Bateman directed Bad Words and cast himself in the main role.

Andrew Dodge's screenplay for Bad Words first received attention after its inclusion on the 2011 Black List, an annual survey of the best unproduced screenplays in Hollywood. The script was sent to actor Jason Bateman, who had asked his agent to pursue directorial work, explaining that being able to direct films was "really the only reason I've been acting for the last 20 years of this career".

After Bateman signed on to direct the film, he and Dodge spent a long time revising the script, particularly adjusting parts where the dark humor "went a little bit too far". In the original script, the story was intended to take place at the Scripps National Spelling Bee in Washington, D.C. The setting was changed to the fictional Golden Quill Spelling Bee in Los Angeles since Bateman did not expect to receive permission from Scripps to use their name in the film.

=== Pre-production ===
Bateman did not initially intend to star in the film, but after approaching two other actors who turned down the role of Guy, he decided to play the main character himself. He felt that it would be easier to play the role himself than to direct another actor to strike the "tricky tone" required, and to ensure that the character remained likeable despite his bad qualities. Allison Janney and Kathryn Hahn were already friends of Bateman's before making Bad Words, so Bateman simply asked them to star in the film rather than going through a regular casting process. Bateman also reached out to Philip Baker Hall, whom he admired and thought "would lend a great deal of pedigree to the film", to offer him a role. Child actor Rohan Chand sent in a taped audition in response to a casting call for 10-year-old Indian boys, and was cast as Chaitanya after talking to Bateman through Skype. Bateman drew from his own experiences as a child actor in directing Chand and tried to minimize Chand's exposure to the film's "off-color material" and nudity.

=== Filming ===
The production of Bad Words began in 2012 with a budget of US$10 million, financed by MXN Entertainment and Darko Entertainment. Principal photography took place over 29 days at the end of 2012 in Los Angeles, with the Sportsman's Lodge in the San Fernando Valley serving as the location of the national spelling bee final. It was filmed on an Arri Alexa camera by cinematographer Ken Seng, who drew inspiration from the 2002 romantic comedy Punch-Drunk Love in shooting a film that was "lit darker than a comedy normally would be".

== Release ==
Bad Words had its world premiere as part of the Special Presentation section of the 2013 Toronto International Film Festival on September 6, 2013. Shortly after the film's premiere screening, it was announced that Focus Features had acquired the worldwide distribution rights for around $7 million. The film was originally scheduled to have a limited release in the United States on March 21, with a wide release following on March 28, 2014; however, the limited release date was later shifted by a week to March 14, 2014 with an expansion on March 21 and the planned wide release on March 28.

=== Box office ===
On its opening weekend in limited release, Bad Words earned $113,301 from 6 theaters; on its first weekend of wide release it grossed $2,560,186 from 842 theaters. After playing in theaters for 11 weeks, the film closed with a total box office gross in the United States of $7,779,614. In the United Arab Emirates the film earned $24,723, for a total worldwide gross of $7,804,337.

=== Home media ===
Bad Words was released on DVD, Blu-ray Disc, and in video on demand format on July 8, 2014. The DVD and Blu-ray releases include an audio commentary recorded by Jason Bateman, a featurette titled "The Minds and Mouths Behind Bad Words" and deleted scenes. It has earned $1,628,459 in DVD sales and $1,166,001 in Blu-ray sales, making a total of $2,794,460 in revenue.

== Reception ==
On Rotten Tomatoes the film has a 65% rating based on 130 reviews, with an average rating of 6.10/10. The website's critical consensus states: "Scabrously funny and gleefully amoral, Bad Words boasts one of Jason Bateman's best performances—and proves he's a talented director in the bargain." On Metacritic, the film holds a score of 57 out of 100, based on 36 critics, indicating "mixed or average" reviews.

Positive reviews for the film praised its script, direction and acting. Writing for Entertainment Weekly, Owen Gleiberman gave Bad Words a grade of A−, praising Dodge's script and Bateman's direction, and describing the film as a "balancing act between sulfurously funny hatred and humanity". Richard Roeper of the Chicago Sun-Times awarded the film 3.5 out of 4 stars, calling it "near-perfect", "brilliant, uncompromising and wickedly funny". Variety's Justin Chang commended Bateman's directorial debut and the film's "often uproarious model of sharp scripting and spirited acting", as well as the performances given by Chand, Hahn and Hall. Rolling Stone critic Peter Travers gave Bad Words 3.5 out of 4 stars, writing that the film was "a tour de force of comic wickedness" in which "Bateman shows the same skill as a filmmaker that he does as an actor". John DeFore opined in a review for The Hollywood Reporter that the film was "scouringly funny" and that Bateman showed "the same knack for timing and fine shadings of attitude" as both the director and the lead actor. The Los Angeles Times' Betsy Sharkey enjoyed Bad Words, summarizing it as "high-minded, foul-mouthed good nonsense" and "sarcastic, sanctimonious, salacious, sly, slight and surprisingly sweet".

Negative reviews, on the other hand, mainly criticized the film's dark humor and the unlikeability of the main character. USA Today's Claudia Puig found the film "neither believable nor funny" and wrote that "it's tough to summon sufficiently negative language to describe the unfunny, desperate mess that is Bad Words". The Boston Globe critic Peter Keough gave the film 1 star out of 4, finding it unfunny, clichéd and offensive with an unlikeable "sociopath" as the main character. Richard Corliss of Time thought that the film failed to redeem Guy's character or justify his "deification", ultimately making it boring and unsatisfying. Similarly, Joe Morgenstern described Guy in a review for The Wall Street Journal as "downright vile, a self-created pariah, and funny enough for a reasonable stretch of time" before the plot becomes "both implausible and banal". The Globe and Mail's Robert Everett-Green gave Bad Words 1 out of 4 stars, deeming it "a shallow remix" of offensive and clichéd characters with poor acting and "mean-spirited" humor.
