= Darko Entertainment =

American production company

Darko Entertainment LLC
- Company type: Production company
- Industry: Film
- Founded: 2007
- Founder: Richard Kelly
- Headquarters: 1999 Avenue of the Stars, Los Angeles, California 90067, United States
- Key people: Sean McKittrick; Ted Hamm; Edward Hamm Jr.
- Products: Films
- Website: www.darko.com

Darko Entertainment LLC is a production company that was launched in late 2007 by writer/director Richard Kelly, who is best known for directing the 2001 cult classic Donnie Darko. Based in Los Angeles, it creates, produces and finances director-driven films, the first of which was Southland Tales. Other notable Darko Entertainment films include World's Greatest Dad, God Bless America, The Box, and Bad Words.
