= Aiden Flowers =

American actor

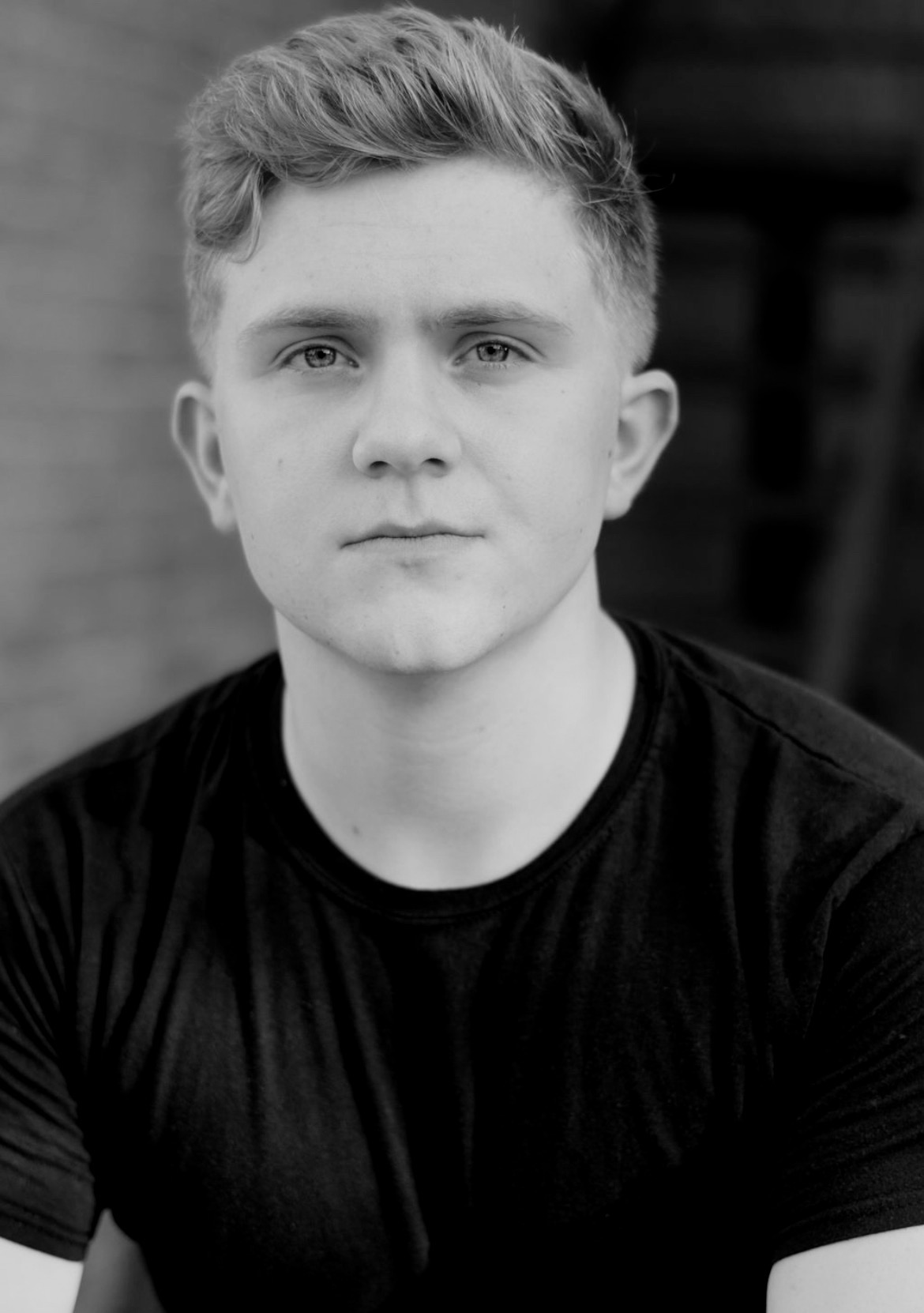
- Flowers in 2024
- Born: Aiden James Flowers; Gulfport, Mississippi, U.S.
- Occupation: Actor
- Years active: 2012–present
- Agent(s): Angie Moncrief, Action Talent Agency
- Known for: Young Klaus Mikaelson on The Originals, 10-year-old Jacob Portman in Miss Peregrine's Home for Peculiar Children
- Parents: Anthony Ryburn Flowers (father); Amanda (Mandye) Self Flowers (mother)
- Relatives: Twin Sisters, Camden and Carsen

Aiden James Flowers is an American actor. He is best known for portraying a young Klaus Mikaelson in the CW network series The Originals. He also appeared in the films The Big Short, Miss Peregrine's Home for Peculiar Children, and Nate Parker's The Birth of a Nation.

== Career ==
In August 2012, Flowers officially began acting when he was cast in the supporting role of Peter Pinkerton in the musical adaptation of Victoria Kann's, Pinkalicious, a role for which he would later win, "Best Supporting Youth Actor," for the 2012 Actor's Playhouse season. Flowers played the son of a lead character in Home Sweet Hell (2015). Flowers was featured in John Schneider's, Smothered, where he played a supporting role as the brother of Abigail Breslin, (real life sister) Carsen Flowers, and the son of Arnold Schwarzenegger.

In 2014, Flowers was chosen for the recurring role of Young Klaus Mikaelson, in the CW network television drama, The Originals, a spin-off series of the show, The Vampire Diaries. Klaus Mikaelson, the lead character, first appeared in Season 2 of The Vampire Diaries and quickly became a fan-favorite. Flowers first appeared in episode 1.16, Farewell to Storeyville, where he helped define Klaus's back story. His portrayal of Young Klaus has been heavily lauded by both cast and fans, alike, and he is regularly invited to fan events in Georgia and throughout the Southeast. Joseph Morgan, who portrays Klaus as an adult, said in interviews that it was a relief to be able to share some of the burden of defining the character of Klaus Mikaelson with such a skilled young performer. Flowers recurs as Young Klaus in flashbacks throughout the series.

Next, Flowers filmed Race to Win, which he shared the lead alongside fellow Originals' actor, Danielle Campbell. In Race to Win, Flowers and Campbell are siblings forced to face a tough decision after a family tragedy. Flowers also made his national commercial debut in 2015 as the "ping pong kid" who beat Peyton Manning in a Nationwide Mutual Insurance commercial. Flowers filmed supporting roles in the Darren Lynn Bousman horror movie, Abattoir, and in the film, Mind Puppets, during this time. In April 2015, he was chosen to play 10-year-old Jacob Portman in Tim Burton's adaptation of Miss Peregrine's Home for Peculiar Children. Aiden dyed his hair black and wore blue contacts to match Asa Butterfiled, who played the lead role of Jacob Portman in the film. In between filming scenes for Miss Peregrine's, he was chosen to play the younger version of Christian Bale's character, Michael Burry, in The Big Short. Flowers also traveled to Savannah, GA to film a supporting role in Nate Parker's The Birth of a Nation during this time. In 2016, Flowers will star as Bobby Joe Potrillo in the film, Craftique, a comedy based on the world of DIY crafting fairs, and will share the lead with Kennedy Brice, in the film, Castle in the Woods.

== Personal life ==
In his down-time Flowers enjoys participating in the award-winning Brio show choir and his church youth group. He also enjoys hiking, singing, dancing, playing piano, writing songs, creating his own stop-motion Lego movies, and watching professional wrestling.

== Filmography ==
=== Film ===
Year	Title	Role
2014	2 Bedroom 1 Bath	Billy
2014	Home Sweet Hell	Andrew Champagne
2015	Maggie	Bobby Vogel
2015	A Gift Horse	Thomas
2015	June	Bully
2015	The Big Short	Young Michael Burry
2016	The Birth of a Nation	Young John Clarke
2016	Smothered	Kid
2016	Abottoir	Charlie
2016	Race to Win	Rudy Rhodes
2016	Miss Peregrine's Home for Peculiar Children	10-year-old Jacob Portman

=== Television ===
Year	Title	Role	Episodes
2014	The Originals	Young Klaus Mikaelson	S1.16 - Farewell to Storyville S2.03 - Every Mother's Son S2.07 - Chasing the Devil's Tale S4.05 - I Hear You Knocking
2014	Salem	Young Hale	S1.11 - Cat and Mouse
