= The Invisible Circus (film) =

2001 film by Adam Brooks

- Theatrical release poster
- Directed by: Adam Brooks
- Screenplay by: Adam Brooks
- Based on: The Invisible Circus by Jennifer Egan
- Produced by: Julia Chasman; Nick Wechsler
- Starring: Jordana Brewster; Christopher Eccleston; Cameron Diaz
- Cinematography: Henry Braham
- Edited by: Elizabeth Kling
- Music by: Nick Laird-Clowes
- Production company: Fine Line Features
- Distributed by: Fine Line Features
- Release dates: January 11, 2001 (Sundance); February 2, 2001 (USA)
- Running time: 93 minutes
- Country: United States
- Language: English
- Box office: $77,578

The Invisible Circus is a 2001 American drama film written and directed by Adam Brooks and starring Jordana Brewster, Christopher Eccleston, and Cameron Diaz. Based on the 1995 novel The Invisible Circus by Jennifer Egan, the film is about a teenage girl who travels to Europe in 1976 in search of answers to her older sister's suicide. During her search, she falls in love with her dead sister's former boyfriend. The film premiered at the Sundance Film Festival on January 11, 2001, and was released in the United States on February 2, 2001.

== Plot ==
In 1976 San Francisco, Phoebe O'Connor is plagued by the mystery surrounding the death of her free-spirited older sister, Faith, who left the United States for Europe when Phoebe was 12 years old, and was subsequently found dead at the base of a precipice in Portugal. Faith's death was ruled a suicide, but Phoebe is skeptical of this claim.

Against the wishes of her mother, Gail, Phoebe departs for Europe hoping to uncover more information about the last year of Faith's life. In Amsterdam, she tracks Faith's boyfriend, Wolf, an Englishman who left San Francisco with Faith. Wolf blames Faith's suicide on drug use, thrillseeking, and a hedonistic lifestyle; he recalls his last moments with Faith in July 1970, when she decided to travel to Berlin to join the Red Army Faction.

After Phoebe has a disturbing vision of Faith in the street, she is invited by Wolf to stay with him and his wife, a French woman named Claire. Wolf recollects Faith's eagerness to engage in radical political protests, including terrorism, which frightened him. Phoebe, wanting to see where her sister last lived, plans to travel to Portugal. Wolf, though initially reluctant, agrees to accompany her on the trip. Soon, their relationship turns romantic.

Phoebe and Wolf make their way to the seaside village where Faith died. When they arrive at the cliffside where Faith died, Wolf further elaborates on Faith's terrorist involvement with the Red Army Faction, including a bomb detonation in Berlin which resulted in the death of an innocent man. Upon reuniting with Faith in Portugal, Wolf found her riddled with guilt, and she made him promise to never tell her family that she was responsible for a man's death. In the midst of a nap on the beach, Wolf awoke to Faith standing on the edge of a rock wall along the cliff. Though he attempted to coax her back, he was unable to stop her from leaping to her death. Phoebe and Wolf embrace, and light a candle for Faith in a nearby cathedral.

== Cast ==
- Jordana Brewster as Phoebe O'Connor
  - Camilla Belle as Young Phoebe
- Christopher Eccleston as Christopher "Wolf"
- Cameron Diaz as Faith O'Connor
- Blythe Danner as Gail
- Patrick Bergin as Gene
- Isabelle Pasco as Claire
- Moritz Bleibtreu as Eric
- Philipp Weissert as Safehouse Leader
- Nikola Obermann as Hannah
- Robert Getter as American Statesman
- Ricky Koole as Nikki

== Reception ==
On the review aggregator website Rotten Tomatoes, 22% of 63 critics' reviews are positive. The website's consensus reads: "Despite Jordana Brewster's strong performance, The Invisible Circus lacks the necessary dramatic tension to be interesting. Also, the cultural and political contexts of the period are barely explored." Metacritic, which uses a weighted average, assigned the film a score of 40 out of 100, based on 22 critics, indicating "mixed or average" reviews.
