= Jordana Brewster =

American actress (born 1980)

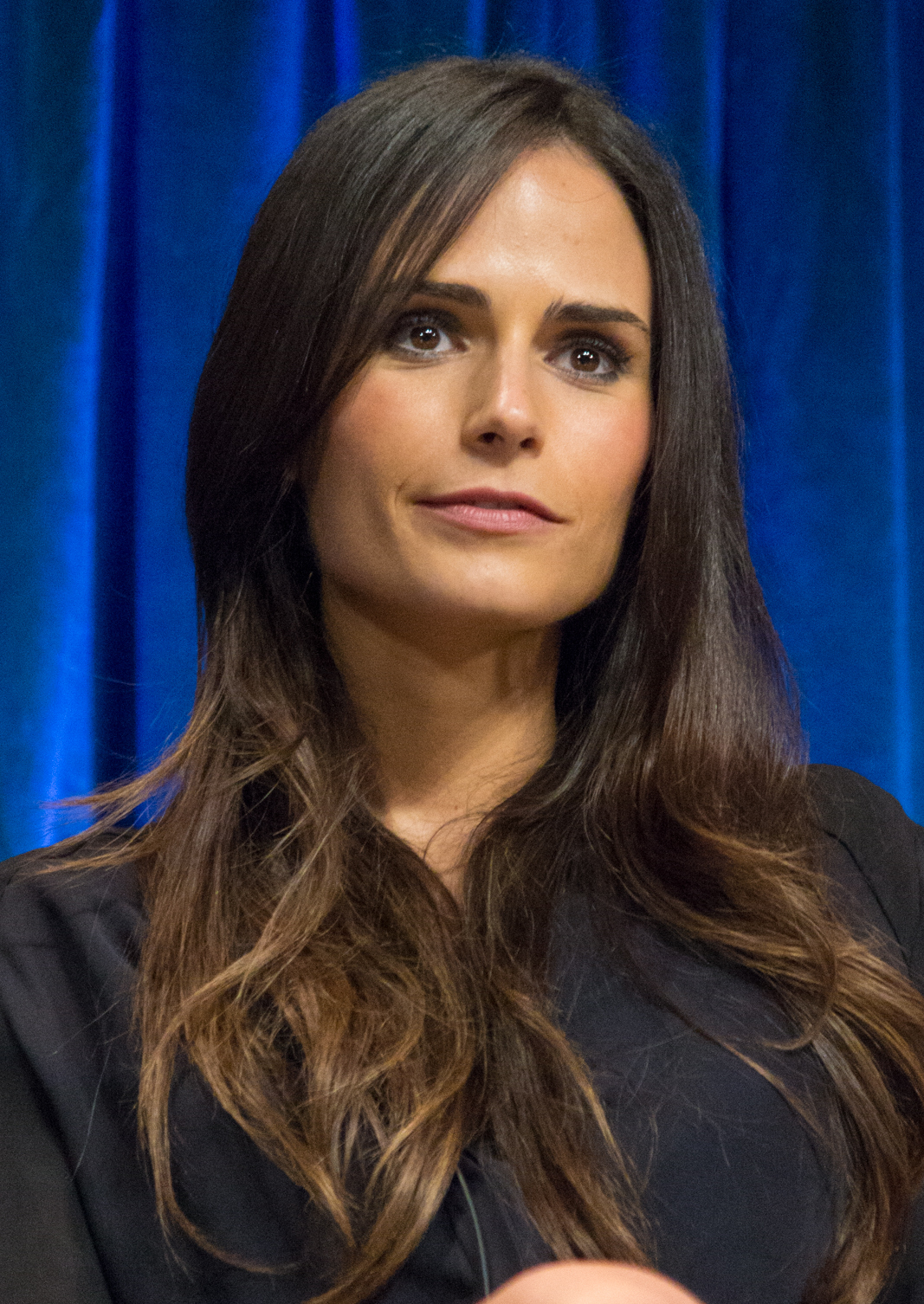
- Brewster in 2013
- Born: April 26, 1980 (age 46); Panama City, Panama
- Citizenship: Panama; United States
- Education: Yale University (BA)
- Occupation: Actress
- Years active: 1995–present
- Spouses: Andrew Form (m. 2007; div. 2021) Mason Morfit (m. 2022)
- Children: 2
- Mother: Maria João
- Relatives: Kingman Brewster Jr. (grandfather)

Jordana Brewster (born April 26, 1980) is an American actress. She made her acting debut, three weeks after turning 15, in an episode of All My Children in 1995 and next took on the recurring role as Nikki Munson in As the World Turns, garnering a nomination for Outstanding Teen Performer at the 1997 Soap Opera Digest Award. Her first role in a feature film was in Robert Rodriguez's horror science fiction The Faculty (1998).

Brewster's breakthrough came with her role of Mia Toretto in the Fast & Furious franchise (2001–present). Other film credits include the drama The Invisible Circus (2001), the action comedy D.E.B.S. (2004) and the horror film The Texas Chainsaw Massacre: The Beginning (2006).

Brewster starred on the re-booted TNT series Dallas from 2012 to 2014. She also had a five-episode arc as Denise Brown in the first season of the FX true crime anthology series American Crime Story (2016). She also starred as Dr. Maureen Cahill on the Fox buddy cop action dramedy Lethal Weapon (2016–2018).

== Early life and education ==
Jordana Brewster was born in Panama City, Panama, on April 26, 1980, the older of two daughters. Her mother, Maria João (née Sousa Leão), is a former swimsuit model from Brazil who appeared on the 1978 cover of Sports Illustrated, and her father, Alden Brewster, is an American investment banker. Her paternal grandfather, Kingman Brewster Jr., was president of Yale University (1963–77) and the United States Ambassador to the United Kingdom (1977–81). Brewster is a direct descendant of Mayflower passengers William Brewster, Edward Doty, and 14 others. Jordana lived in London, England and moved to Brazil when she was six years old. She left Brazil at 10, settling in Manhattan, New York City, where she studied at the Convent of the Sacred Heart and graduated from the Professional Children's School. Brewster graduated from Yale University with a B. A. in English Literature in 2003.

== Career ==
=== 1990s ===
Brewster made her debut in daytime soap operas, with a one-time appearance on All My Children as Anita Santos. She next played the recurring role of rebellious daughter Nikki Munson on As the World Turns. From 1995 to 2001, she appeared in a total of 104 episodes of the soap opera. For her performance, she was nominated for Outstanding Teen Performer at the 1997 Soap Opera Digest Awards. Her first film role was in Robert Rodriguez's horror science fiction film The Faculty (1998), written by Kevin Williamson and co-starring Elijah Wood, Josh Hartnett, and Clea DuVall. In the film about strange occurrences involving the faculty of an Ohio high school, Brewster played a popular vindictive cheerleading captain and an editor in chief of the student paper. The film received mixed reviews, but grossed US$40 million in North America. In 1999, she appeared opposite Julia Stiles and Jerry O'Connell in an NBC television miniseries entitled The '60s, playing a student activist.

=== 2000s ===
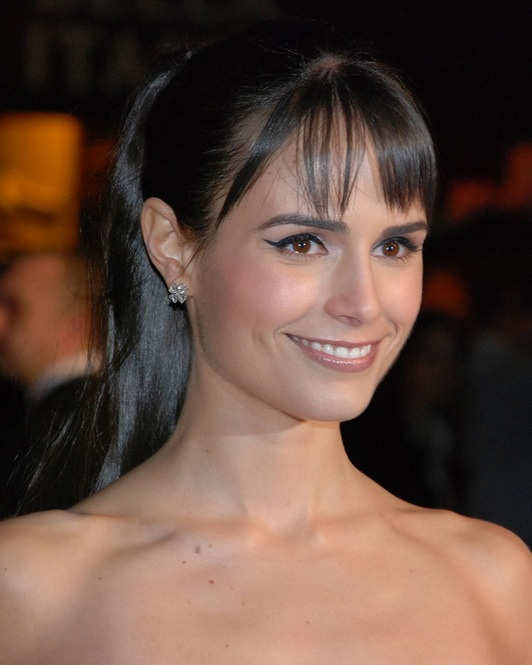
Brewster at the Fast & Furious premiere in 2009

Brewster starred with Cameron Diaz and Christopher Eccleston in the independent drama The Invisible Circus (2001), portraying a grieving teenage girl who travels to Europe in 1976 in search of answers to the suicide of her older sister. The film premiered at the Sundance Film Festival and received a limited theatrical release. The New York Times felt that Brewster "can't summon a credible range of emotion" in her portrayal. Her breakthrough came afterward in 2001, when she took on the role of Mia Toretto opposite Vin Diesel and Paul Walker in the street racing action film The Fast and the Furious. As she did not have a driver's license, she took driving lessons during production. Todd McCarthy of Variety, in his review for the film, noted that Brewster did a "better job here than she did as a searching teen in the recent The Invisible Circus." The film was a commercial success, grossing over US$207 million worldwide.

Following the release of The Fast and the Furious, Brewster took a break from acting to complete her B. A. in English at Yale from which she graduated in 2003. She returned to the screen when she played as a lesbian criminal mastermind in the action comedy D.E.B.S. (2004). A.V. Club dismissed the development of Brewster on-screen relationship with co-star Sara Foster, writing that "D.E.B.S. oscillates between the glib camp smirkiness of its half-hearted action send-up and the thudding earnestness of its romance". It was distributed in limited release. She starred as the love interest of a high school student in the 1970s in the independent teen drama Nearing Grace (2005), which was screened at the Los Angeles Film Festival.

Brewster appeared in the drama Annapolis (2006), directed by Justin Lin and starring James Franco and Tyrese Gibson. In the film, she played a Midshipman 2nd Class named Ali, and the love interest of a man attending the United States Naval Academy. Annapolis was panned by critics and grossed US$7.7 million in its opening weekend, described as "uninspired" by Box Office Mojo. Brewster next starred in the slasher horror The Texas Chainsaw Massacre: The Beginning (2006), opposite Diora Baird, Taylor Handley, and Matt Bomer. The film saw the four actors portray friends driving across Texas who are taken captive by the Hewitt family. Despite largely negative reviews, the film made US$51 million worldwide. For her performance, Brewster was nominated for both Choice Movie Actress: Horror–Thriller and Choice Movie: Scream at the 2007 Teen Choice Awards.

Brewster had a four-episode arc between 2008 and 2009 on the NBC television series Chuck, as Jill Roberts, the title character's ex-girlfriend from Stanford. She returned to the role of Mia Toretto in Fast & Furious (2009), the fourth film of the Fast & Furious franchise. On the growth of her character over the course of the series, Brewster explained in an interview with AskMen.com, "In the first one I'm more of a wallflower and it's much more of a girlfriend-type role, but in [the new movie] I'm more of a woman. She's far more tough. I deal with the repercussions of living in my brother's world." The film earned negative reviews upon its premiere, but was a box office success, grossing US$363 million globally.

=== 2010s ===
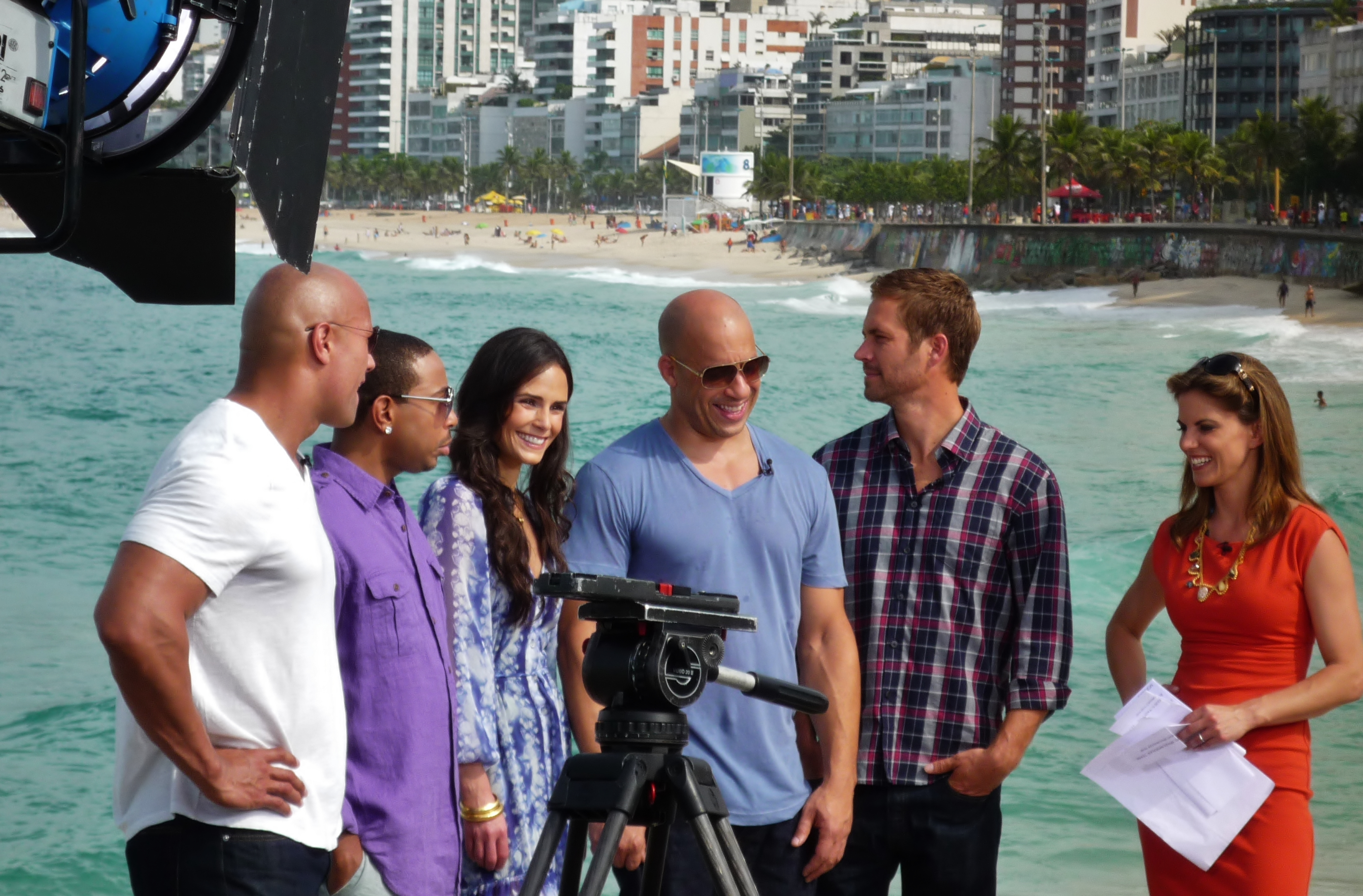
Brewster (third from left) with the cast of Fast Five in 2011

In 2010, Brewster made a three-episode appearance in Dark Blue, playing an art gallery dealer named Maria, and guest-starred in two episodes of Gigantic. She reprised the role of Mia in the fifth film in the series, Fast Five (2011), which making a departure from the street racing theme, revolves around Diesel, Walker and Brewster's characters as they plan a heist to steal a fortune from a corrupt businessman in Brazil. Critical response toward Fast Five was positive while it earned US$86 million in its North American opening weekend and US$626.1 million worldwide. In 2012, Brewster starred as Elena Ramos, on Dallas, an updated version of CBS's original series of the same name (1978–1991) about the trials and tribulations of a wealthy Texas family. The series was met with an overall positive response and aired until 2014.

She played Mia Toretto for the fourth time in Fast & Furious 6 (2013), which follows the remaining wanted fugitives on the heist from Fast Five. The film earned a worldwide total of US$789 million. She returned for the next installment, Furious 7 (2015), which was the final film appearance of Walker, who died in a single-vehicle accident while filming was only half-completed. After Walker's death, filming was delayed for script rewrites to the story arcs for both Walker and Brewster's characters, causing them to be retired. The highest-grossing film in the franchise, it grossed US$397.6 million worldwide during its opening weekend and US$1.5 billion worldwide. She next appeared in the independent action drama American Heist (2014), as the girlfriend of a man involved in a crime. It screened at the Toronto International Film Festival and premiered in a ten-theater run in North America. Brewster also played a young and flirtatious salesperson named Dusty in the dark comedy Home Sweet Hell (2015), released for VOD and selected theaters.

In 2016, she took on the recurring role of Denise Brown, the sister of Nicole Brown Simpson, in The People v. O. J. Simpson, the first season of the true crime anthology series American Crime Story, revolving around the infamous O. J. Simpson murder case. A "giant fan" of executive producer Ryan Murphy, she remarked about obtaining the role: "I heard they were making it and I always felt like my aunt actually really looked a lot like Denise Brown, so my manager and I took a side-by-side photo edit of me and Denise and we fought really hard for it. We just fought to get that show". Also in 2016, she signed on to play the regular role of Dr. Maureen Cahill, a Los Angeles Police Department psychologist, on the FOX buddy cop action dramedy Lethal Weapon and starred in the second season of the ABC anthology crime drama Secrets and Lies as Kate Warner. After not appearing in 2017's The Fate of the Furious, Brewster returned as Mia Toretto in the ninth instalment of the franchise, 2021's F9. Her older son Julian also performed in F9 with a small role.

== Public image ==
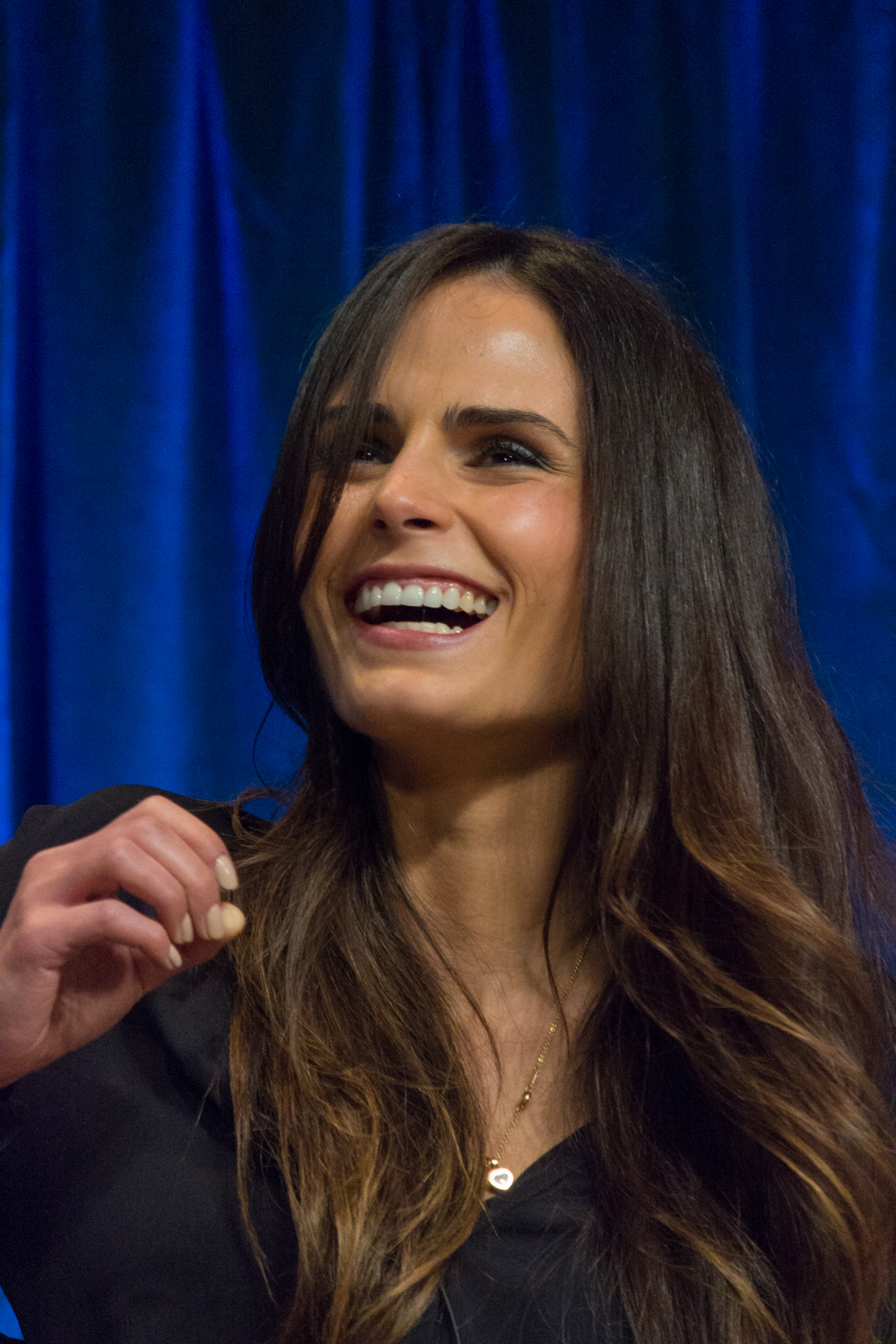
Brewster at the PaleyFest 2013 forum on the TV show Dallas

In 2002, Stuff magazine named her the 96th hottest woman in their "102 Sexiest Women in the World". In 2005, Maxim magazine named her the 54th sexiest woman in the world in their annual Hot 100, while in 2006, Maxim placed her at No. 59. In 2009, she was ranked No. 9 on Maxim's Hot 100 and, to coincide with the release of Fast and Furious, a photographic spread of Brewster in a range of black lingerie in their May 2009 edition ("Life in the Fast Lane"). In 2011, Maxim placed Brewster at No.11 in their Hot 100.

In 2015, Brewster posed nude for the May issue of Allure magazine – alongside Laverne Cox, Nicole Beharie, Katheryn Winnick, and Sandrine Holt.

In June 2016, the Human Rights Campaign released a video in tribute to the victims of the Orlando nightclub shooting; in the video, Brewster and others told the stories of the people killed there.

Prior to the 2022 election, Brewster and other celebrities partnered with non-profit, non-partisan voter advocacy and ID assistance group VoteRiders to host text-banking and letter-writing events to encourage people to vote and connect eligible voters with voter ID assistance.

== Personal life ==
Brewster and film and television producer Andrew Form met on the set of The Texas Chainsaw Massacre: The Beginning, which Form produced. They announced their engagement on November 4, 2006, and married in the Bahamas on May 6, 2007. They have two sons born via surrogacy: Julian, born in September 2013 and Rowan, born in June 2016. Brewster filed for divorce in mid-2020. The divorce was finalized in June 2021. She married ValueAct Capital CEO Mason Morfit on September 3, 2022 in California.

== Filmography ==
=== Film ===
Year	Title	Role	Notes	Ref.
1998	The Faculty	Delilah Profitt		
2001	The Invisible Circus	Phoebe		
2001	The Fast and the Furious	Mia Toretto		
2004	D.E.B.S.	Lucy Diamond		
2005	Win a Date with Tad Hamilton!	Actress	Uncredited; Deleted scene	
2005	Nearing Grace	Grace Chance		
2006	Annapolis	Alison "Ali" Halloway		
2006	The Texas Chainsaw Massacre: The Beginning	Chrissie		
2006	Friendly Fire	The Wife		
2009	Fast & Furious	Mia Toretto		
2011	Fast Five	Mia Toretto		
2013	Fast & Furious 6	Mia Toretto		
2014	American Heist	Emily	VOD and limited release	
2015	Home Sweet Hell	Dusty	VOD and limited release	
2015	Furious 7	Mia Toretto		
2019	Random Acts of Violence	Kathy		
2020	Hooking Up	Tanya		
2021	F9	Mia Toretto		
2021	On Our Way	Ruby Richardson		
2022	The Integrity of Joseph Chambers	Tess		
2022	Who Invited Charlie?	Rosie		
2023	Simulant	Faye		
2023	Fast X	Mia Toretto		
2024	Cellar Door	Sera		
2025	Heart Eyes	Detective Jeanine Shaw		

=== Television ===
Year	Title	Role	Notes	Ref.
1995	All My Children	Anita Santos	Unknown episode	
1995–2001	As the World Turns	Nikki Munson	Main role; 118 episodes	
1999	The '60s	Sarah Weinstock	Television mini-series	
2007	Mr. and Mrs. Smith	Jane Smith	Unaired television pilot	
2008–2009	Chuck	Dr. Jill Roberts	Recurring role; 4 episodes	
2010	Dark Blue	Maria	Recurring role; 3 episodes	
2010	Gigantic	Celebrity	Guest role; 2 episodes	
2012–2014	Dallas	Elena Ramos	Main role; 40 episodes	
2013	Project Runway	Herself / Guest Judge	Episode: "Finally on My Own"	
2016	American Crime Story	Denise Brown	Recurring role; 5 episodes	
2016	Secrets and Lies	Kate Warner	Main role; 10 episodes	
2016	Robot Chicken	Molly McIntire / Cindy Brady	Episode: "Secret of the Flushed Footlong"; voice role	
2016–2018	Lethal Weapon	Dr. Maureen Cahill	Main role; 33 episodes	
2019	Magnum P.I.	Hannah	Guest role; 2 episodes	
2021	The Other Two	Herself	Episode: "Pat Gets an Offer to Host “Tic Tac Toe”"	
2022	Chad & JT Go Deep	Herself	Episode: "Raising Awareness"	
2022	That's My Jam	Herself	Episode: "Kate Hudson & Oliver Hudson vs. Jordana Brewster & Brent Morin"	
2023	The Rookie: Feds	Vampire Cop Co-Star	Episode: "Out for Blood"	
2023	Neon	Gina	Main role	
2025	Elsbeth	Chloe	Episode: "Tearjerker"	
2026	Life, Larry and the Pursuit of Unhappiness	Beatrice	Episode: "Deepthroat"	
TBA	Bishop †	Kat Clairborne	Main role	

Key
†	Denotes television productions that have not yet been released

=== Music videos ===
Year	Artist(s)	Song	Role	Notes	Ref.
2000	Neve	"It's Over Now"	—N/a		
2001	Ja Rule, Vita & O1	"Furious"	Mia Torreto	Archival footage	
2015	Wiz Khalifa & Charlie Puth	"See You Again"	Mia Torreto	Archival footage	

== Awards and nominations ==
Year	Awards	Category	Recipient	Outcome
1997	Soap Opera Digest Awards	Outstanding Teen Performer	As the World Turns	Nominated
2007	Teen Choice Awards	Choice Movie Actress: Horror	The Texas Chainsaw Massacre: The Beginning	Nominated
2007	Teen Choice Awards	Choice Movie: Scream	The Texas Chainsaw Massacre: The Beginning	Nominated
2009	Teen Choice Awards	Choice Movie Actress: Action	Fast & Furious	Won
2011	Teen Choice Awards	Choice Movie Actress: Action	Fast Five	Nominated
2012	ALMA Awards	Favorite TV Actress	Dallas	Nominated
2013	NAACP Image Awards	Best Supporting Actress in Television	Dallas	Nominated
2015	Teen Choice Awards	Choice Movie Actress: Action	Furious 7	Nominated
2017	People's Choice Awards	Favorite Actress in a New TV Series	Lethal Weapon	Nominated
