= New Boss =

- The Office episode
- Episode no.: Season 5 Episode 20
- Directed by: Paul Feig
- Written by: Lee Eisenberg; Gene Stupnitsky
- Cinematography by: Randall Einhorn
- Editing by: David Rogers
- Production code: 520
- Original air date: March 19, 2009

Guest appearances
- Idris Elba as Charles Miner; Andy Buckley as David Wallace

Episode chronology
← Previous "Golden Ticket"	Next → "Two Weeks"
- The Office (American season 5)

"New Boss" is the twentieth episode of the fifth season of the television series The Office and the 92nd overall episode of the series. It originally aired on NBC in the United States on March 19, 2009. In the episode, Michael Scott is disturbed by the arrival of his new no-nonsense superior Charles Miner, played by The Wire star Idris Elba, his first of six guest appearances with The Office. Jim struggles to make a good impression on Charles, and Angela and Kelly both develop crushes on their new boss.

The episode was written by Lee Eisenberg and Gene Stupnitsky, and directed by Paul Feig. It received generally positive reviews from television critics, particularly for the twist of Michael's resignation, which multiple reviewers said added a fresh new change to the series. According to Nielsen ratings, "New Boss" was watched by 7.95 million overall viewers in its original airing.

== Plot ==
Michael Scott is planning a party to celebrate his fifteenth anniversary at Dunder Mifflin on the same day that new company vice president, Charles Miner, visits Scranton. Charles exhibits a no-nonsense attitude, making Michael insecure about being in charge. Charles establishes a good relationship with the rest of the staff by buying lunch and revealing the truth about their 401(k) plans and the possibility of layoffs, which Michael withheld to avoid worrying anyone. Charles takes up responsibilities that are normally Michael's, causing Michael to wonder whether his position is threatened. Chief Financial Officer David Wallace advises Michael to become better acquainted with Charles, but he is unsuccessful. Michael fails to contact Wallace by phone, with one attempt transferred to Charles. When Charles sees the Party Planning Committee planning Michael's party, he dissolves the committee, saying it is irresponsible to spend company resources on recreation while employees are being laid off. Frustrated with being undermined, Michael drives to New York to talk to Wallace.

Jim Halpert wears a tuxedo in response to a memo written by Dwight Schrute about "professionalism in the workplace". This leads to an awkward encounter with Charles as Jim explains the tuxedo is a prank. Jim is further scrutinized by Charles when he notices Jim's idea of a "two-way petting zoo" for Michael's party. Jim tries elevating his standing with Charles by discussing his position as Assistant Regional Manager, but when Charles presses him about the position, Jim confesses Michael made it up to appease Dwight. When Charles leaves, Jim says goodbye, with no response. Jim halfheartedly jokes that his career could be over.

Angela Martin and Kelly Kapoor develop crushes on Charles, but their flirtations make him uncomfortable. At the end of the day Kelly puts on more makeup to tempt Charles into asking her out, but he has left. Kelly runs out to the parking lot, finding Angela holding Charles's scarf and chases her. Angela says that Charles deserves better than Kelly.

In New York, Michael tracks down Wallace, who has seemingly been avoiding him. Michael complains about being forced to drive to New York to talk to him, and that he deserves more respect after fifteen years at Dunder Mifflin. David agrees to fund and attend an anniversary party for him. Dissatisfied that David is missing the bigger point, Michael responds by announcing his resignation.

== Production ==
I am much more courageous in real life with the parts I want to play. They don't often come my way. The Office is comedy. No one in a month of Sundays would invite me do comedy. So I love the fact that someone is out there looking and understanding that there might be more in this nutshell.

— Idris Elba

"New Boss" was written by Lee Eisenberg and Gene Stupnitsky and directed by Paul Feig. Executive story editor Charlie Grandy conceived the idea of Michael leaving Dunder Mifflin. "New Boss" was the first of six episodes Idris Elba was set to guest star in as Charles, Michael's new Dunder Mifflin superior. It was his first role in a comedy and his first television appearance since leaving his regular role on HBO's The Wire, where he played the character Stringer Bell. Elba, a fan of The Office, said, "The creators of the show called me, said they wanted to put me in as this new character, that I’d be perfect for it, and I was honored, so I said yeah. [...] I’m still playing the straight guy, but he’s kind of got a bit of a quirk to him." The writing staff for The Office were fans of The Wire, and had referred to the show in previous episodes. Of the six episodes Elba appeared in, he said "New Boss" was the only one he watched immediately after they aired because, "I'm hypercritical about my work, so I try not to torture myself." Elba is the second actor from The Wire to appear on The Office, after actress Amy Ryan, who played Michael's love interest Holly Flax. Paul Lieberstein, the Office producer who also plays Toby, said Elba's work on The Wire made him "a really interesting and great foil for Michael". John Krasinski said Elba was initially an intimidating presence on the set, due to the ruthless character he plays on The Wire. However, Krasinski said Elba proved to be "incredibly nice and incredibly funny".

The official The Office website included three cut scenes from "New Boss" within a week of the episode's original release. One clip includes Andy, Creed, Oscar, and Meredith gossiping about Charles; Andy says, "I'm telling you, when corporate sends somebody it is big trouble, or really good news, and then again sometimes it just means business as usual." Another clip features Jim expressing his worries to Pam about Charles's apparent distaste for him, as Pam playfully makes fun of Jim. The video ends with Pam asking Jim to leave her workspace because, "I don't want him to keep seeing us together."

In what some reporters described as a continuity error, Charles Miner refers to Jim's second-in-command position as "made-up", but the position is real and Jim was officially hired for it in the third season episode "Branch Closing". When asked by a fan about the apparent inconsistency, The Office writer Aaron Shure said he believed it was because "Charles is clearly not great at reading people and he's headstrong", and the fact that Jim does not normally care about titles, so he was not used to having to defend himself in such a way. However, Shure admitted he was "[trying] to wiggle out of this one" with his answer.

== Reception ==
In its original American broadcast on March 19, 2009, "New Boss" was watched by 7.95 million overall viewers and received a Nielsen rating of 3.9 among adults aged between 18 and 49, and 4.4 among ages 18 to 34. The episode received generally positive reviews. Marc Hirsh of National Public Radio said the addition of the no-nonsense Charles Miner character infused a sense of reality into The Office, which he said was growing increasingly wacky and out of control: "[The episode] may, in fact, have been one of the most important episodes of the entire series, acting as a corrective to the show's increasing flirtations with ridiculousness. The characters of The Office have lived in a bubble for long enough." Travis Fickett of IGN said "New Boss" brought a badly needed change to the series, which he said had been in a "stagnant state" over the last several episodes. Fickett said Steve Carell gave "a tour de force" as Michael saw his power slip away, and he called the final scene when Michael quit as one of the show's biggest moments. He said, "Watching Miner work like a monkey wrench thrown into the works is the most fun I've had watching this show in a long time." Shahzad Abbas of TV Guide said, "Overall, this was a terrific episode, tightly structured, some nice laugh-out loud moments, and a genuine shocker at the end that was completely consistent with Michael's personality."

Alan Sepinwall, television critic for The Star-Ledger, said the episode was satisfying, although he felt it was short on laughs, except for Jim's antics with the tuxedo and the episode's documentary-style interviews. Sepinwall particularly praised the twist of Michael quitting and said he looked forward to seeing where the subplot went. Jeff Labrecque said "watching Jim flail for approval [was] one of the episode's most awkward delights", but he said the episode was really about "the type of man Michael Scott really is". Labrecque also said he looked forward to seeing how Michael regained his job, and raised the suggestion that the reason Michael clashed so much with Charles was because he was intimidated by the man's race. Brian Howard of The Journal News said, "For 22 minutes of not much fun and only some funny, 'New Boss' was a pretty good episode." He particularly liked the ending, which he said he did not see coming and served as a kind of redemption for Michael; Howard also liked Pam's documentary interviews and Jim's failed efforts to make a good impression to Charles. Several reviewers particularly praised the line about the "two-way petting zoo", a zoo in which people pet the animals and the animals pet back.

Joshua Alston of Newsweek criticized the episode and the introduction of the Charles character. Although Alston said Elba's acting was fine, he said the character "sucked the funny out of every scene he was in" and created an awkwardness inappropriate for the show. During the week following the episode's original broadcast, many fans theorized on the Internet that Michael said "I acquit" rather than "I quit", and that Michael's supposed resignation was something of a prank. Jenna Fischer, who plays Pam on The Office, addressed this issue on her MySpace blog, saying, "He said 'I quit'. And he meant it. You will see how it all plays out this week on the show."

The introduction of Charles Miner ranked number three in phillyBurbs.com's top ten moments from the fifth season of The Office.
