= World's Greatest Dad =

- Theatrical release poster
- Directed by: Bobcat Goldthwait
- Written by: Bobcat Goldthwait
- Produced by: Howard Gertler; Ted Hamm; Richard Kelly; Sean McKittrick; Tim Perell
- Starring: Robin Williams; Daryl Sabara; Alexie Gilmore; Evan Martin; Lorraine Nicholson; Henry Simmons; Geoff Pierson
- Cinematography: Horacio Marquínez
- Edited by: Jason Stewart
- Music by: Gerald Brunskill
- Production company: Darko Entertainment
- Distributed by: Magnolia Pictures
- Release date: August 21, 2009
- Running time: 99 minutes
- Country: United States
- Language: English
- Budget: $10 million
- Box office: $295,750

World's Greatest Dad is a 2009 American black-comedy drama film written and directed by Bobcat Goldthwait and starring Robin Williams, Daryl Sabara and Alexie Gilmore. The film was released on July 24, 2009, on video on demand providers before its limited theatrical release on August 21, 2009 by Magnolia Pictures.

== Plot ==
Lance Clayton is a single father and high school English teacher who dreams of becoming a famous writer, but his previous novels have all been rejected by publishers. His 15-year-old son Kyle is a sex-obsessed, underachieving misanthrope who is a student at the school where Lance teaches an unpopular poetry class.

Kyle's poor academic performance and vile behavior gain the attention of the school principal, who advises Lance to transfer Kyle to a special-needs school. One night, Lance discovers that Kyle has died in an autoerotic asphyxiation accident in his bedroom. To salvage his son's dignity, Lance stages Kyle's death as a suicide. He hangs Kyle in a closet and posts a fake suicide note on his body.

A classmate obtains the suicide note from police records and publishes it in the school newspaper. The note strikes a chord with the students and faculty, and many students suddenly claim to have been friends with Kyle, touched by how deep and intelligent he shows himself to be in his writings. Enjoying the attention that his writing is finally receiving, Lance decides to write and publish a phony journal that was supposedly written by his son before his death.

Kyle becomes somewhat of a post-mortem cult phenomenon at the school, and Lance begins to receive the adoration that he has always desired. He becomes much more interesting to his girlfriend Claire, a fellow teacher who had previously shown an interest in their younger colleague Mike. Andrew, Kyle's sole friend, finds Kyle's suicide note and journals highly uncharacteristic based on Kyle's personality when he was alive, but Lance brushes Andrew off when Andrew confronts him.

The journal attracts the attention of book publishers, and Lance lands a television appearance on a national talk show. The school principal decides to rename the school library in Kyle's honor. At the library dedication, Lance feels guilt for exploiting his son's death for his own benefit, as well as animosity toward those feigning fondness for Kyle. While giving a speech, Lance decides that he can no longer continue the charade and confesses to everyone that Kyle's death was accidental, and that he wrote the suicide note and journal. Predictably, Lance is denounced by the students and faculty, including Claire, and simultaneously realizes that it is better to be alone than to be with people who make him feel alone.

Despite being generally despised, Lance feels reborn and dives naked into the school's swimming pool. Outside, Andrew tells Lance that he knew the truth all along but nevertheless enjoyed his writing, and encourages him to keep writing. The two happily watch a zombie movie at Lance's home with his neighbor Bonnie.

== Cast ==
- Robin Williams as Lance Clayton
- Alexie Gilmore as Claire Reed
- Daryl Sabara as Kyle Clayton
- Evan Martin as Andrew Troutman
- Geoff Pierson as Principal Wyatt Anderson
- Henry Simmons as Mike Lane
- Mitzi McCall as Bonnie McBon
- Jermaine Williams as Jason
- Lorraine Nicholson as Heather Johnson
- Morgan Murphy as Morgan
- Toby Huss as Bert Green
- Tom Kenny as Jerry Klein
- Jill Talley as Make-Up Woman
- Bruce Hornsby as himself
- Krist Novoselic as Newspaper Vendor (cameo)
- Bobcat Goldthwait as Limo Driver (uncredited)

== Production ==
The film was shot in Seattle, Washington, largely at the former F.A. McDonald School in Wallingford. Seattle resident and former Nirvana bassist Krist Novoselic has a wordless cameo while consoling Robin Williams's character at a newspaper stand; Goldthwait had previously been an opening act for Nirvana. Bruce Hornsby appears as himself at the library dedication.

== Critical reception ==
As of December 2024, World's Greatest Dad holds an 88% approval rating on Rotten Tomatoes, based on 117 reviews, with an average rating of 6.93/10. The critical consensus reads: "World's Greatest Dad is a risky, deadpan, dark comedy that effectively explores the nature of posthumous cults of celebrity." The film also holds a score of 69 out of 100 on Metacritic, based on 24 critics, indicating "generally favorable" reviews.

Paul Fischer of Dark Horizons named it as one of the best films of the year.

Ben Lyons and Ben Mankiewicz both gave the film favorable reviews on At the Movies. Mankiewicz saluted Daryl Sabara's performance as exceptionally well done, commented on the film's "remarkably funny script", and overall considered it a "little gem".

Roger Ebert of the Chicago Sun-Times gave World's Greatest Dad three stars out of four, but noticed that the material could have been even darker in its satire, and he questioned whether it was the director's intention.

In later years, the film's plot has been compared to that of the 2015 stage musical Dear Evan Hansen due to its similar premise of a suicide note landing in the wrong hands and causing a chain of events that result in consequences.

== Home media ==
The movie was released on DVD on December 8, 2009, and features an audio commentary by the director, as well as deleted scenes, outtakes and a "making-of" featurette.
