= The Box (2009 film) =

2009 film by Richard Kelly

- Theatrical release poster
- Directed by: Richard Kelly
- Screenplay by: Richard Kelly
- Based on: "Button Button" by Richard Matheson
- Produced by: Richard Kelly; Dan Lin; Sean McKittrick
- Starring: Cameron Diaz; James Marsden; Frank Langella
- Cinematography: Steven Poster
- Edited by: Sam Bauer
- Music by: Win Butler; Régine Chassagne; Owen Pallett
- Production companies: Radar Pictures; Media Rights Capital
- Distributed by: Warner Bros. Pictures
- Release date: November 6, 2009
- Running time: 115 minutes
- Country: United States
- Language: English
- Budget: $30 million
- Box office: $33.3 million

The Box is a 2009 American science fiction horror film written, produced, and directed by Richard Kelly, and starring Cameron Diaz, James Marsden, and Frank Langella. It is based on the 1970 short story "Button Button" by Richard Matheson. Set in 1976, it follows a couple who receive a box from a mysterious man who offers them one million dollars if they press the button sealed within the dome on top of the box but tells them, once the button is pushed, someone they do not know will die.

The film was released on November 6, 2009, by Warner Bros. Pictures. The film received mixed reviews from critics and grossed $33.3 million worldwide against a budget of $30 million, but has subsequently developed a cult following over time alongside Kelly's other feature films.

== Plot ==
A CIA internal memo relates that a man named Arlington Steward recovered from severe burn wounds induced by a lightning strike and is delivering units related to the Mars project.

In December 1976, married couple Norma and Arthur Lewis awaken early one morning to find a mysterious package on their doorstep. Inside is a wooden box with a button protected by a glass dome, a key, and a note stating that "Mr. Steward will visit at 5:00pm". Norma and Arthur have breakfast with their son, Walter, before Arthur heads to work at NASA, where he works in optics and was involved in designing the camera for the Viking Mars probe. Arthur learns he has been rejected from the astronaut program due to failing the psychological exam.

Norma, who teaches literature at an elite private school, reveals her disfigured right foot to her class during a discussion on Jean-Paul Sartre's vision of Hell. She learns from her boss that her tuition discount for Walter's school is being revoked, causing financial concern. Later, Arlington Steward, a man with a severely disfigured face, arrives at their door as promised. He presents an offer: if they press the button, someone they do not know will die, and they will receive one million dollars. Steward leaves them with 24 hours to decide.

After much deliberation, Norma impulsively presses the button. Steward returns and gives them the promised money, implying that someone close to them may die as a consequence. Arthur attempts to return the money, but Steward leaves abruptly. Later, Arthur and Norma attend a wedding rehearsal dinner, where Arthur encounters a student of Norma's and sees a box similar to the one left on their doorstep, containing a photograph of Steward.

Arthur's investigation into Steward's background reveals his car is registered to the NSA. Concurrently, Norma receives a cryptic warning from a stranger at a supermarket, instructing her to look up a library call number and not trust Arthur. Steward chastises Norma for involving the police, as Arthur had asked Norma's father, a police officer, to run Steward's license plate.

At home, Arthur's encounter with their babysitter, Dana, reveals she is not who she claims to be. She directs him to look in the mirror for answers before disappearing mysteriously. Further, Arthur discovers Steward's photo in a picture from his work at NASA.

Arthur and Norma separately visit a library, each following clues leading to Steward. Arthur, guided by Steward's wife, navigates through three otherworldly portals made of a water-like substance, choosing the correct one based on a prior hint. Norma, guided by Steward, reflects on her disfigurement and experiences a moment of emotional connection with him.

Norma and Arthur reunite at home, where Arthur emerges from the water portal, and they find Walter demanding answers. At a wedding, their son is kidnapped, and Arthur is abducted by a former NASA employee, who reveals he faced a similar choice between his wife and daughter. Arthur is shown a manual and water portals but is interrupted by a Santa Claus figure before being struck by a truck.

It emerges that "Steward" is controlled by some sort of otherworldly or extraterrestrial presence (referred to as his "employers" and "those who control the lightning"), which he encountered through his work on the Mars probe. Through him and other unwitting cohorts, the "employers" are using the boxes to test humanity's morality, to decide whether or not it is worthy of extinction.

Arthur emerges from a NASA warehouse, surrounded by military personnel. Back home, Steward offers them a final choice: live with their million dollars and a deaf-blind son, or Arthur can shoot Norma, restoring Walter's senses and securing the money for his future. They learn Steward's employers are testing humanity's worthiness.

Norma and Arthur decide to sacrifice Norma. After she is shot, Walter's senses are restored, and Steward delivers the million to another couple who have pressed the button. Arthur is taken away by authorities, indicating the cycle of testing will continue.

== Cast ==
- Cameron Diaz as Norma Lewis
- James Marsden as Arthur Lewis
- Frank Langella as Arlington Steward
- James Rebhorn as Norm Cahill
- Holmes Osborne as Dick Burns
- Sam Oz Stone as Walter Lewis
- Gillian Jacobs as Dana / Sarah Matthews
- Celia Weston as Lana Burns
- Deborah Rush as Clymene Steward
- Lisa K. Wyatt as Rhonda Martin
- Mark Cartier as Martin Teague
- Kevin Robertson as Wendell Matheson
- Michele Durrett as Rebecca Matheson
- Ian Kahn as Vick Brenner
- John Magaro as Charles
- Ryan Woodle as James

== Production ==
=== Development ===
Director Richard Kelly wrote a script based on the 1970 short story "Button, Button" by author Richard Matheson, which had previously been turned into a Twilight Zone episode of the same name. Kelly's screenplay expands significantly upon the story, notably adding plot elements of conspiracy theory and alien life not present in the original. The project had a budget of over $30 million provided by Media Rights Capital. Kelly described his intent for the film, "My hope is to make a film that is incredibly suspenseful and broadly commercial, while still retaining my artistic sensibility."

=== Casting ===
Actress Cameron Diaz was cast in the lead role in June 2007.

Actor Frank Langella was cast in October 2007, and production began on the film the following month. Prior to production, actor James Marsden was cast a lead role opposite Diaz. It was the second time Marsden and Langella worked together, the first being Superman Returns and re-teaming again in Robot & Frank.

=== Filming ===
Most of the filming took place in the Boston, Massachusetts, area, with scenes shot in downtown Boston, South Boston, Waltham, Ipswich, Winthrop, Milton, Medfield, Quincy, Kingston, and North Andover, as well as other localities. Some filming took place on the Milton Academy campus and at Boston Public Library. A large indoor set was built inside a former Lucent Technologies building in North Andover to recreate a NASA laboratory. The production crew also journeyed to NASA's Langley Research Center in Hampton, Virginia, to shoot a number of scenes for the film. Richard Kelly's father had worked at NASA Langley in the 1970s and 80s.

Filming also took place in Richmond, Virginia, including overhead shots of the city, including 95 South passing the train station. Many background extras were reused in different scenes, and people with period-correct 60s and 70s cars were encouraged to participate. Arlington Steward's car, in particular, is a Buick Electra, although characters in the movie refer to it as Lincoln Town Car (an entirely different car model, which was not yet in production at the time the movie is set).

The film was shot digitally using the Panavision Genesis camera, according to Kelly. Production concluded by February 2008.

=== Music ===
In December 2008, it was announced that Win Butler and Regine Chassagne of Canadian band Arcade Fire, and Owen Pallett provided an original score for the film. Butler, Chassagne, and Pallett helped Kelly during the editing process by advising his decisions. Butler, Chassagne, and Pallett had planned on releasing the soundtrack after Arcade Fire's third album release in August 2010, but as of 2023, the soundtrack is still unavailable.

== Release ==
The film was first released in Australia on October 29, 2009. While it was originally scheduled to be released in the United States on October 30, 2009, on July 31, 2009, it was announced the release date would be delayed to November 6, 2009.

The film opened with $7,571,417 in 2,635 theaters at an average of $2,873 per theater. It ranked number 6 at the box office coming in behind the newly released Disney's A Christmas Carol, The Men Who Stare at Goats, and The Fourth Kind. The film went on to gross $15,051,977 domestically and $32,924,206 worldwide.

=== Home media ===
The Box was released on DVD, Blu-ray and digital download in the U.S. on February 23, 2010.

== Reception ==
Review aggregator Rotten Tomatoes reports that 42% of 153 critics have given the film a positive review, and the average rating is 5.2/10. The site's consensus is that "Imaginative but often preposterous, The Box features some thrills but largely feels too piecemeal." Metacritic, which assigns a rating out of 100 to reviews from film critics, has a score of 47 based on 24 reviews. Audiences polled by CinemaScore on opening day gave the film an F, for which CinemaScore President Ed Mintz blamed the film's ending and was quoted as saying "People really thought this was a stinker."

Betsy Sharkey of the Los Angeles Times gave the film 1 out of 5 stars, describing it as "painfully sluggish new sci-fi morality play". Sharkey stated Kelly usually had "the touch when it comes to the subversive", and praised the film's staging and lighting, but wrote that the presentation was "all for naught, because the narrative is so fractured and foolish." Writing for Rolling Stone, Peter Travers praised Kelly's ideas but criticized the film's exposition and pacing, stating that "Instead of sweeping you along, The Box just sits there like something unclaimed at lost and found. Damaged goods."

Roger Ebert of the Chicago Sun-Times gave the film three out of four stars and wrote: "This movie kept me involved and intrigued, and for that I'm grateful." Jordan Mintzer of Variety wrote: "Kelly's trademark mix of sci-fi, surrealism and suburbia occasionally entertains." Keith Uhlich of Time Out New York named The Box the ninth-best film of 2009, calling it "a defiantly personal project that solidifies writer-director Richard Kelly's talent, even as it surely pushes him further toward the filmmaking fringe."

=== Accolades ===
Award/association	Year	Category	Subject	Result	Ref.
Fangoria Chainsaw Awards	2010	Best Supporting Actor	Frank Langella	Nominated	
Fangoria Chainsaw Awards	2010	Best Score	Win Butler; Régine Chassagne; Owen Pallett	Nominated	
Fangoria Chainsaw Awards	2010	Worst Film		Nominated	
Saturn Awards	2010	Best Horror Film		Nominated	
Saturn Awards	2010	Best Supporting Actor	Frank Langella	Nominated	
Visual Effects Society	2010	Outstanding Supporting Visual Effects in a Feature Motion Picture	Peter Cvijanovic; Mark Kolpack; Olcun Tan; Thomas Tannenberger	Nominated	
