= Richard Kelly (filmmaker) =

American filmmaker

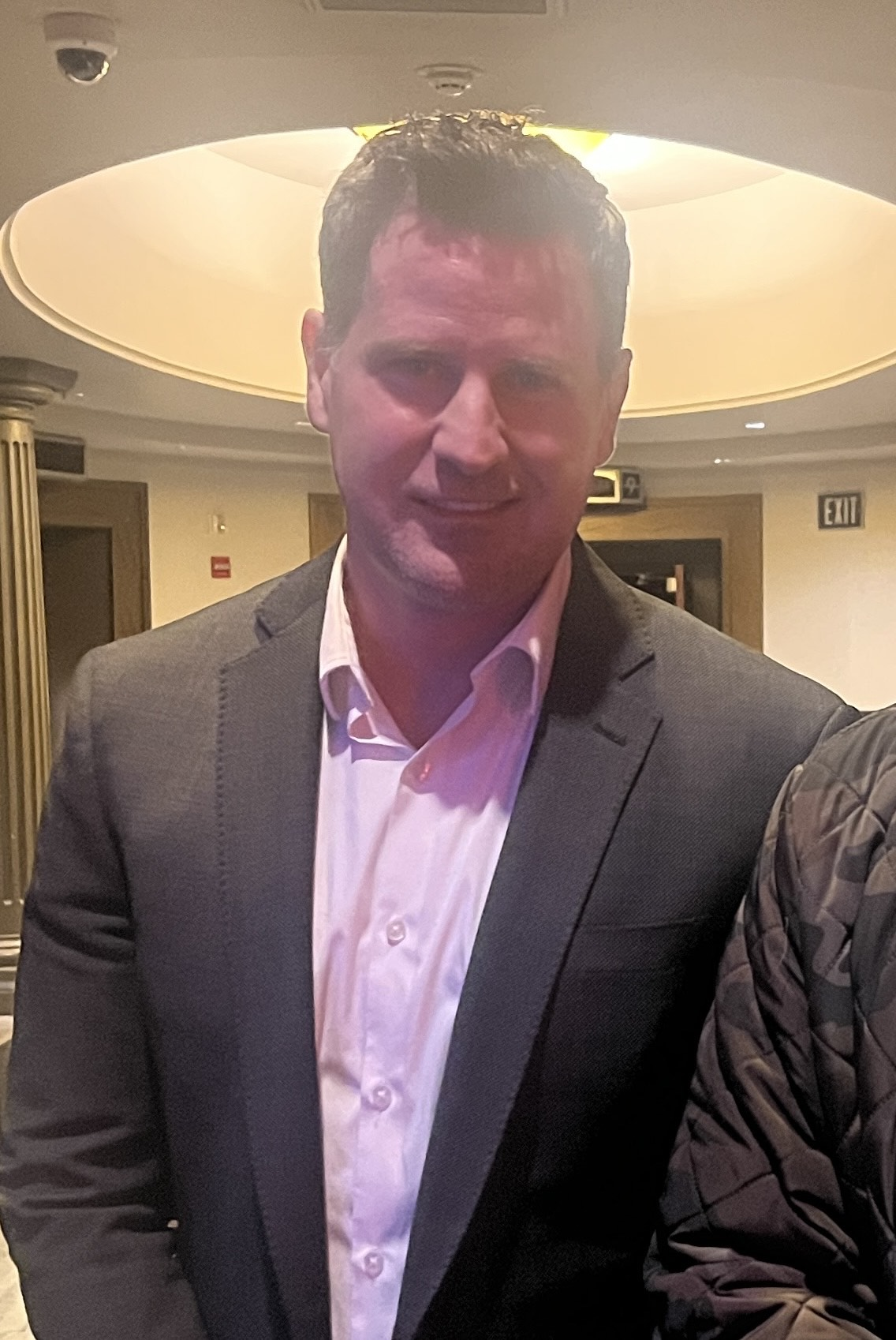
- Kelly in 2025
- Born: James Richard Kelly; 1975 (age 50–51)
- Education: University of Southern California (BFA)
- Occupations: Film director; screenwriter; producer
- Years active: 1996–present

James Richard Kelly is an American film director, screenwriter and producer. He wrote and directed the films Donnie Darko (2001), Southland Tales (2006), and The Box (2009).

== Early life ==
Kelly grew up in Midlothian, Virginia, where he attended Midlothian High School and graduated in 1993. When he was a child, his father worked for NASA on the Mars Viking Lander program. He won a scholarship to the University of Southern California to study at the USC School of Cinema-Television where he was a member of the Phi Delta Theta fraternity. He made two short films at USC, The Goodbye Place and Visceral Matter, before graduating in 1997.

Kelly spoke of viewing the film Brazil with author Robert K. Elder in an interview for The Film That Changed My Life:

I think the greatest thing I learned from Terry is that every frame is worthy of attention to detail. Every frame is worthy of being frozen in time and then thrown on a wall like an oil painting, and if you work hard on every frame, the meaning of your film becomes deeper, more enhanced.

== Film career ==
Donnie Darko (2001) is Kelly's first feature and was nominated for 21 awards, winning eleven. It later made #2 on Empire magazine's list of the 50 greatest independent films of all time, behind Quentin Tarantino's Reservoir Dogs.

In 2003, he wrote the thriller film House at the End of the Street (2012) with Jonathan Mostow set as director, before they both left the project.

In 2005, Kelly wrote the screenplay for the Tony Scott-directed film Domino. Kelly has said: "That was a wonderful experience. I wrote that for Tony Scott. That was Tony Scott's very personal project that he had spent eight years developing with Domino Harvey, a close friend of his and almost like a daughter to him. He had spent years trying to tell her story and so that for me, it was an honor for me to get to work with Tony and to write that script for him and to design this really elaborate puzzle for him to tell her story. So that was just a privilege."

Kelly has written numerous scripts that have not been produced, among them adaptations of Kurt Vonnegut's Cat's Cradle and Louis Sachar's Holes.

His fourth film and second feature, Southland Tales, a rough cut of which screened in competition at the 2006 Cannes Film Festival, was released November 16, 2007, and stars Dwayne Johnson, Sarah Michelle Gellar, Seann William Scott, Kevin Smith and Miranda Richardson.

In 2008, Kelly's production company Darko Entertainment announced that it was producing the adaptation of the bestselling book I Hope They Serve Beer in Hell with director Bob Gosse. The book's author Tucker Max detailed Kelly's involvement in the process on his blog.

After the release of The Box, he said he was working on a thriller "set in Manhattan in the year 2014. We hope to shoot the movie in 3-D, and part of the movie would be filmed using full CGI motion capture." In 2011, he announced that he was writing and directing Corpus Christi, a Texas-set film to be produced by Eli Roth. The production was cancelled due to financial and casting problems. Kelly said he would instead focus on a true crime thriller titled Amicus, starring James Gandolfini, whose death in 2013 prevented that.

In a 2017 interview with PopMatters magazine journalist J.C. Maçek III, Kelly said in regard to doing an official sequel to Donnie Darko: "I'm open to doing something much bigger and longer and more ambitious that could be a new story," Kelly said and then added, "We'll see what happens. I have a lot of stuff that I'm working on and it's ambitious and it's expensive and we'll see what happens." Regarding the 2009 Donnie Darko sequel S. Darko, Kelly has said: "I had nothing to do with it. And I hate it when people try and blame me or hold me responsible for it because I had no [involvement]. I don't control the underlying rights to [the Donnie Darko franchise]. I had to relinquish them when I was 24 years old. I hate when people ask me about that because I've never seen it and I never will, so… don't ask me about the sequel."

As of 2025, Kelly claimed to have ten different projects in the works, all in various stages of development. "I'm waiting to see which project the movie gods will bless with the green light." According to an issue of Production Weekly, while no title, casting or plot details were revealed, a fall 2025 shoot was planned.

== Writing career ==
In 2026, Kelly announced plans to release The Philosophy of Time Travel, a novel that is a sequel to Donnie Darko. Kelly's debut novel will be published via Range Literary Publishing.

== Reception ==
In 2009, Manohla Dargis of The New York Times wrote, "The similarities among all three of his features (he also wrote the screenplay for Domino) are striking and suggest that Mr. Kelly is developing a worldview, puzzling through the great questions, or fast-working himself into a creative impasse, maybe all three."

In 2016, filmmaker Kevin Smith said of Kelly: "He is insanely creative and is not unlike Christopher Nolan. But Nolan wound up in the Warner Bros. system where he got special handling, and he got a lot of money to make huge art films like Inception. Richard can be one of our greatest filmmakers. He is right now, but just a lot of people don't realize it. He's still a kid, and someone needs to Nolan that kid."

== Filmography ==
=== Feature films ===
Year	Title	Director	Writer	Producer
2001	Donnie Darko	Yes	Yes	No
2005	Domino	No	Yes	No
2006	Southland Tales	Yes	Yes	No
2009	The Box	Yes	Yes	Yes
2009	World's Greatest Dad	No	No	Yes
2009	I Hope They Serve Beer in Hell	No	No	Yes
2010	Operation: Endgame	No	No	Yes

=== Short films ===
Year	Title	Director	Writer	Producer	Notes
1996	The Goodbye Place	Yes	Yes	Yes	Also sound designer
1997	Visceral Matter	Yes	Yes	No	

== Awards and nominations ==
Year	Award	Category	Title	Result
2001	Sundance Film Festival	Grand Jury Prize	Donnie Darko	Nominated
2001	Sitges Film Festival	Best Film	Donnie Darko	Nominated
2002	Imagine Film Festival	Silver Scream Award	Donnie Darko	Won
2002	Online Film Critics Society	Breakthrough Filmmaker	Donnie Darko	Nominated
2002	Independent Spirit Awards	Best First Feature	Donnie Darko	Nominated
2002	Independent Spirit Awards	Best First Screenplay	Donnie Darko	Nominated
2002	Chicago Film Critics Association	Most Promising Director		Nominated
2006	Cannes Film Festival	Palme d'Or	Southland Tales	Nominated
