= List of American films of 2009 =

This is a list of American films released in 2009.

== Box office ==
The highest-grossing American films released in 2009, by domestic box office gross revenue, are as follows:

Highest-grossing films of 2009
Rank	Title	Distributor	Domestic gross
1	Avatar	20th Century Fox	$749,766,139
2	Transformers: Revenge of the Fallen	Paramount Pictures	$402,111,870
3	Harry Potter and the Half-Blood Prince	Warner Bros. Pictures	$301,959,197
4	The Twilight Saga: New Moon	Summit Entertainment	$296,623,634
5	Up	Disney	$293,004,164
6	The Hangover	Warner Bros. Pictures	$277,322,503
7	Star Trek	Paramount Pictures	$257,730,019
8	The Blind Side	Warner Bros. Pictures	$255,959,475
9	Alvin and the Chipmunks: The Squeakquel	20th Century Fox	$219,614,612
10	Sherlock Holmes	Warner Bros. Pictures	$209,028,679

== January–March ==
Opening		Title	Production company	Cast and crew	Ref.
J A N U A R Y	9	Bride Wars	20th Century Fox / Fox 2000 Pictures / Regency Enterprises	Gary Winick (director); Greg DePaul, June Diane Raphael, Casey Wilson (screenplay); Kate Hudson, Anne Hathaway, Bryan Greenberg, Chris Pratt, Steve Howey, Candice Bergen, Kristen Johnston, Michael Arden, June Diane Raphael, Casey Wilson, Paul Scheer, John Pankow, Hettienne Park, Lauren Bittner, Dennis Parlato, Billy Unger, Colin Ford	
J A N U A R Y	9	The Unborn	Rogue Pictures / Relativity Media / Platinum Dunes	David S. Goyer (director/screenplay); Odette Yustman, Gary Oldman, Cam Gigandet, Meagan Good, Idris Elba, Jane Alexander, Atticus Shaffer, James Remar, Carla Gugino, C.S. Lee, Rhys Coiro, Ethan Cutkosky, Rachel Brosnahan, Michael Sassone, Craig Harris, Kymberly Mellen, Brian Boland, Roslyn Alexander	
J A N U A R Y	16	Hotel for Dogs	DreamWorks Pictures / Nickelodeon Movies / The Donners' Company	Thor Freudenthal (director); Jeff Lowell, Mark McCorkle, Bob Schooley (screenplay); Emma Roberts, Jake T. Austin, Don Cheadle, Johnny Simmons, Kyla Pratt, Troy Gentile, Lisa Kudrow, Kevin Dillon, Ajay Naidu, Eric Edelstein, Robinne Lee, Yvette Nicole Brown, Maximiliano Hernández, Andre Ware, Jonathan Klein, Kenny Vibert, Steve Liska, Jeremy Howard, Tiya Sircar, Mariah Buzolin, Jim Doughan, Gina St. John, Catherine McCord, Dwayne Swingler, Gregory Sporleder, Cosmo the Dog, Emily Kuroda, Ivan Reitman	
J A N U A R Y	16	Paul Blart: Mall Cop	Columbia Pictures / Relativity Media / Happy Madison Productions	Steve Carr (director); Kevin James, Nick Bakay (screenplay); Kevin James, Jayma Mays, Keir O'Donnell, Bobby Cannavale, Adam Ferrara, Peter Gerety, Stephen Rannazzisi, Jamal Mixon, Adhir Kalyan, Erick Avari, Raini Rodriguez, Shirley Knight, Gary Valentine, Allen Covert, Mike Vallely, Jackie Sandler, Mike Escamilla, Jason Ellis, Jason Packham, Rick Thorne, Victor Lopez, Natascha Hopkins, Mookie Barker	
J A N U A R Y	16	Notorious	Fox Searchlight Pictures	George Tillman Jr. (director); Reggie Rock Bythewood, Cheo Hodari Coker (screenplay); Jamal Woolard, Angela Bassett, Derek Luke, Anthony Mackie, Antonique Smith, Marc John Jefferies, Naturi Naughton, Kevin Phillips, Julia Pace Mitchell, Dennis L.A. White, Edwin Freeman, Sean Ringgold, Anwan Glover, Charles Malik Whitfield, Aunjanue Ellis, John Ventimiglia, David Costabile, Christopher Wallace Jr., Valence Thomas, Jasper Briggs	
J A N U A R Y	16	My Bloody Valentine 3D	Lionsgate	Patrick Lussier (director); Todd Farmer, Zane Smith (screenplay); Jensen Ackles, Jaime King, Kerr Smith, Betsy Rue, Megan Boone, Edi Gathegi, Tom Atkins, Kevin Tighe, Marc Macaulay, Todd Farmer, Selene Luna, Richard John Walters, Karen Baum, Joy de la Paz, Jeff Hochendoner, Chris Carnel	
J A N U A R Y	23	Ink	Double Edge Films	Jamin Winans (director); Chris Kelly, Quinn Hunchar, Jessica Duffy	
J A N U A R Y	23	Inkheart	New Line Cinema	Iain Softley (director); David Lindsay-Abaire (screenplay); Brendan Fraser, Paul Bettany, Helen Mirren, Jim Broadbent, Andy Serkis, Eliza Bennett, Rafi Gavron, Sienna Guillory, Lesley Sharp, Jamie Foreman, Matt King, John Thomson, Jennifer Connelly, Marnix Van Den Broeke, Steve Speirs, Jessie Cave, Adam Bond, Tereza Srbova, Emily Eby, Roger Allam, Paul Kasey, Stephen Graham	
J A N U A R Y	23	Killshot	The Weinstein Company	John Madden (director); Hossein Amini (screenplay); Diane Lane, Mickey Rourke, Thomas Jane, Joseph Gordon-Levitt, Rosario Dawson, Hal Holbrook, Don McManus, Lois Smith, Tom McCamus, Tony Nappo	
J A N U A R Y	23	Outlander	The Weinstein Company	Howard McCain (director); James Caviezel, Sophia Myles, Ron Perlman, John Hurt, Jack Huston	
J A N U A R Y	23	Underworld: Rise of the Lycans	Screen Gems / Lakeshore Entertainment	Patrick Tatopoulos (director); Danny McBride, Dirk Blackman, Howard McCain (screenplay); Michael Sheen, Bill Nighy, Rhona Mitra, Steven Mackintosh, Kevin Grevioux, David Aston, Elizabeth Hawthorne, Craig Parker, Jared Turner, Tania Nolan, Brian Steele, Kate Beckinsale, Shane Brolly, Shane Rangi, Larry Rew, Timothy Raby, Geraldine Brophy, Leighton Cardno, Jason Hood, Mark Mitchinson, Peter Tait, Eleanor Williams, Edwin Wright	
J A N U A R Y	27	Open Season 2	Sony Pictures Home Entertainment / Sony Pictures Animation	Matthew O'Callaghan, Todd Wilderman (directors); David I. Stern (screenplay); Joel McHale, Mike Epps, Jane Krakowski, Billy Connolly, Crispin Glover, Steve Schirripa, Georgia Engel, Diedrich Bader, Cody Cameron, Fred Stoller, Olivia Hack, Danny Mann, Matthew W. Taylor, Nika Futterman, Dana Belben, Jeff Bennett, Elisa Gabrielli, Nicholas Guest, Bridget Hoffman, Walter Jones, Maurice LaMarche, Scott Menville, Kevin Michael Richardson, Predrag 'Pređo' Vušović, Sean Mullen, Michelle Murdocca, Jacquie Barnbrook, Ranjani Brow, June Christopher, David Cowgill, Rachel Crane, Omar Crook, Lauri Fraser, Wendy Hoffmann, Hans Tester, Zlatan Zuhric-Zuhra	
J A N U A R Y	30	New in Town	Lionsgate / Gold Circle Films	Jonas Elmer (director); C. Jay Cox, Ken Rance (screenplay); Renée Zellweger, Harry Connick Jr., J. K. Simmons, Nathan Fillion, Siobhan Fallon Hogan, Frances Conroy, Rashida Jones, Hilary Carroll, Barbara James Smith, Nancy Drake, Mike O'Brien, Ferron Guerreiro, James Durham, Robert Small, Kristina Dawson	
J A N U A R Y	30	The Uninvited	DreamWorks Pictures	Charles & Thomas Guard (directors); Craig Rosenberg, Doug Miro, Carlo Bernard (screenplay); Emily Browning, Arielle Kebbel, David Strathairn, Elizabeth Banks, Jesse Moss, Kevin McNulty, Don S. Davis, Heather Doerksen, Maya Massar, Lex Burnham, Danny Bristol, Matthew Bristol, Dean Paul Gibson	
F E B R U A R Y
F E B R U A R Y	3	Space Buddies	Walt Disney Studios Home Entertainment / Keystone Entertainment / Key Pix Productions	Robert Vince (director/screenplay); Anna McRoberts (screenplay); Bill Fagerbakke, Kevin Weisman, Lochlyn Munro, Ali Hillis, Pat Finn, Nolan Gould, Wayne Wilderson, Diedrich Bader, Jason Earles, Field Cate, Liliana Mumy, Josh Flitter, Skyler Gisondo, Henry Hodges, Amy Sedaris, Gig Morton, Quinn Lord, C. Ernst Harth, Chris Gauthier, Mike Dopud, Ellie Harvie, Nico Ghisi, Sophia Ludwig, Reese Schoeppe, John Czech, Michael Teigen	
F E B R U A R Y	6	Coraline	Focus Features / Laika	Henry Selick (director/screenplay); Dakota Fanning, Teri Hatcher, Ian McShane, John Hodgman, Keith David, Robert Bailey Jr., Jennifer Saunders, Dawn French, Jerome Ranft, John Linnell, Carolyn Crawford, Aankha Neal, George Selick, Hannah Kaiser, Marina Budovsky, Harry Selick, Emerson Hatcher, Christopher Murrie, Jeremy Ryder, Yona Prost	
F E B R U A R Y	6	Fanboys	The Weinstein Company	Kyle Newman (director); Ernest Cline, Adam F. Goldberg (screenplay); Jay Baruchel, Dan Fogler, Sam Huntington, Chris Marquette, Kristen Bell, David Denman, Christopher McDonald, Billy Dee Williams, Danny Trejo, Ethan Suplee, Seth Rogen, Allie Grant, Carrie Fisher, Jason Mewes, Kevin Smith, Jaime King, Danny McBride, Ray Park, Craig Robinson, Joe Lo Truglio, Lou Taylor Pucci, Will Forte, William Shatner, Pell James, Zak Knutson, Noah Segan, Peter Mayhew, Michael Shanks, Armin Shimerman	
F E B R U A R Y	6	He's Just Not That into You	New Line Cinema	Ken Kwapis (director); Abby Kohn, Marc Silverstein (screenplay); Ben Affleck, Jennifer Aniston, Drew Barrymore, Jennifer Connelly, Kevin Connolly, Bradley Cooper, Ginnifer Goodwin, Scarlett Johansson, Justin Long, Kris Kristofferson, Wilson Cruz, Hedy Burress, Sasha Alexander, Leonardo Nam, Busy Philipps, Natasha Leggero, Angela Shelton, Frances Callier, Brandon Keener, Brooke Bloom, Marc Silverstein, Cory Hardrict, Annie Ilonzeh, Bill Brochtrup, John Ross Bowie, Googy Gress, Greg Behrendt, Luis Guzmán, Mary Stuart Masterson, Cristine Rose, Eric Stoltz	
F E B R U A R Y	6	The Pink Panther 2	Metro-Goldwyn-Mayer / Columbia Pictures	Harald Zwart (director); Steve Martin, Scott Neustadter, Michael H. Weber (screenplay); Steve Martin, Jean Reno, Emily Mortimer, Andy García, Alfred Molina, Yuki Matsuzaki, Aishwarya Rai, John Cleese, Lily Tomlin, Jeremy Irons, Johnny Hallyday, Geoffrey Palmer, Molly Sims, Yevgeni Lazarev, Federico Castelluccio, Harry Van Gorkum, Christiane Amanpour, Sharon Tay, Karen Strassman, Armel Bellec, Jack Metzger, Linda Sans	
F E B R U A R Y	6	Push	Summit Entertainment	Paul McGuigan (director); David Bourla (screenplay); Chris Evans, Dakota Fanning, Camilla Belle, Djimon Hounsou, Joel Gretsch, Ming-Na Wen, Cliff Curtis, Nate Mooney, Corey Stoll, Scott Michael Campbell, Neil Jackson, Maggie Siff, Xiao Lu Li, Haruhiko Yamanouchi, Colin Ford, Paul Car, Kwan Fung Chi	
F E B R U A R Y	6	The Objective	IFC Films	Daniel Myrick (director/screenplay); Mark A. Patton, Wesley Clark Jr. (screenplay); Jonas Ball, Matthew R. Anderson, Jon Huertas	
F E B R U A R Y	13	Confessions of a Shopaholic	Touchstone Pictures / Jerry Bruckheimer Films	P. J. Hogan (director); Tim Firth, Tracey Jackson (screenplay); Isla Fisher, Hugh Dancy, Krysten Ritter, John Goodman, Joan Cusack, John Lithgow, Kristin Scott Thomas, Fred Armisen, Leslie Bibb, Lynn Redgrave, Robert Stanton, Julie Hagerty, Nick Cornish, Wendie Malick, Clea Lewis, Stephen Guarino, John Salley, Lennon Parham, Christine Ebersole, Michael Panes, Kelli Barrett, Kristen Connolly, Susan Blommaert, Matt Servitto, Brandi Burkhardt, Scott Evans, Marceline Hugot, Bea Miller, Peyton List, Ed Helms	
F E B R U A R Y	13	Friday the 13th	New Line Cinema / Paramount Pictures / Platinum Dunes	Marcus Nispel (director); Damian Shannon, Mark Swift (screenplay); Jared Padalecki, Danielle Panabaker, Amanda Righetti, Travis Van Winkle, Aaron Yoo, Derek Mears, Jonathan Sadowski, Julianna Guill, Ben Feldman, Arlen Escarpeta, Ryan Hansen, Willa Ford, Nick Mennell, America Olivo, Kyle Davis, Richard Burgi, Chris Coppola, Nana Visitor, Kathleen Garrett, Stephanie Rhodes	
F E B R U A R Y	13	The International	Columbia Pictures / Relativity Media / Atlas Entertainment	Tom Tykwer (director); Eric Warren Singer (screenplay); Clive Owen, Naomi Watts, Armin Mueller-Stahl, Ulrich Thomsen, Brían F. O'Byrne, Patrick Baladi, Haluk Bilginer, Luca Barbareschi, Felix Solis, Jack McGee, Tibor Feldman, James Rebhorn, Remy Auberjonois, Ian Burfield, Ben Whishaw, Peter Jordan, Axel Milberg, Lucian Msamati, Luca Calvani, Eric Warren Singer, Michel Voletti, Jay Villiers, Fabrice Scott, Alessandro Fabrizi, Nilaja Sun, Steven Randazzo	
F E B R U A R Y	13	The Secret of Moonacre	IFC Films	Gábor Csupó (director); Graham Alborough, Lucy Shuttleworth (screenplay); Ioan Gruffudd, Tim Curry, Natascha McElhone, Dakota Blue Richards, Juliet Stevenson, Augustus Prew, Michael Webber, Andy Linden	
F E B R U A R Y	13	Two Lovers	Magnolia Pictures	James Gray (director/screenplay); Richard Menello (screenplay); Joaquin Phoenix, Gwyneth Paltrow, Vinessa Shaw, Isabella Rossellini, Elias Koteas, Moni Moshonov, Bob Ari, Julie Budd, Iain J. Bopp, Samantha Ivers, Jeanine Serralles, Miguel Rivera	
F E B R U A R Y	20	Fired Up	Screen Gems	Will Gluck (director); Freedom Jones (screenplay); Eric Christian Olsen, Nicholas D'Agosto, Sarah Roemer, Molly Sims, David Walton, AnnaLynne McCord, Adhir Kalyan, Collins Pennie, Juliette Goglia, Hayley Marie Norman, Margo Harshman, Danneel Harris, John Michael Higgins, Philip Baker Hall, Edie McClurg, Jake Sandvig, Nicole Tubiola, Smith Cho, Masi Oka, Michael Blaiklock, Alan Ritchson, Tanya Chisholm, Julianna Guill, Kayla Ewell, Kate French, Joy Osmanski, Jessica Szohr, Kelen Coleman, Francia Raisa, Janel Parrish, Kate Lang Johnson, Jill Latiano, Shoshana Bush, Amber Stevens, Heather Morris, Brian Unger, Andrew Fleming, Madison Riley, Nicholas James, Rachele Brooke Smith	
F E B R U A R Y	20	Madea Goes to Jail	Lionsgate / Tyler Perry Studios	Tyler Perry (director/screenplay); Tyler Perry, Derek Luke, Keshia Knight Pulliam, Ion Overman, Sofia Vergara, Vanessa Ferlito, David Mann, Tamela Mann, RonReaco Lee, Viola Davis, Keke Palmer, Bobbi Baker, Jackson Walker, Robin Coleman, Aisha Hinds, Benjamín Benítez, Phil McGraw, Mablean Ephriam, Greg Mathis, Al Sharpton, Whoopi Goldberg, Sherri Shepherd, Elisabeth Hasselbeck, Joy Behar, Tom Joyner, Steve Harvey, Michael Baisden, Frank Ski, india.arie, Wanda Smith, Sybil Wilkes, Shirley Strawberry, J. Anthony Brown	
F E B R U A R Y	21	Taking Chance	HBO Films	Ross Katz (director/screenplay); Michael Strobl (screenplay); Kevin Bacon, Tom Aldredge, Nicholas Reese Art, Blanche Baker, Guy Boyd, Gordon Clapp, Mike Colter, Joel de la Fuente, Liza Colón-Zayas, Ann Dowd, Tate Ellington, Noah Fleiss, Enver Gjokaj, Danny Hoch, Ruby Jerins, Tom Kemp, John Bedford Lloyd, John Magaro, Matthew Morrison, Maximilian Osinski, Wolé Parks, Victor Slezak, Felix Solis, Sarah Thompson, Paige Turco, Julie White, Emily Wickersham, Tom Wopat, Tom Bloom, James Castanien, Julian Gamble, Brendan Griffin, William Wise	
F E B R U A R Y	25	Examined Life	Zeitgeist Films	Astra Taylor (director); Cornel West, Slavoj Žižek, Judith Butler, Kwame Anthony Appiah, Michael Hardt, Martha Nussbaum, Avital Ronell, Peter Singer, Sunaura Taylor	
F E B R U A R Y	27	An American Affair	Screen Media Films	William Olsson (director); Alex Metcalf (screenplay); Gretchen Mol, James Rebhorn, Cameron Bright, Noah Wyle, Perrey Reeves, Mark Pellegrino, Jimmy Bellinger, Jermaine Crawford, Jerry Hart, Lisa-Lisbeth Finney, Laurel Astri, Sarah Hart, Jerry Whiddon, Monika Samtani, Hannah Williams, Gerry Paradiso, Kris Arnold, Courtney Miller	
F E B R U A R Y	27	Crossing Over	The Weinstein Company	Wayne Kramer (director/screenplay); Harrison Ford, Ray Liotta, Jim Sturgess, Ashley Judd, Cliff Curtis, Alice Braga, Alice Eve, Summer Bishil, Jacqueline Obradors, Justin Chon, Melody Khazae, Marshall Manesh, Leonardo Nam, Tim Chiou, Johnny Young, Lizzy Caplan, Aramis Knight, Mahershalalhashbaz Ali, Bailey Chase, Sarah Shahi, Sung Hi Lee, Josh Gad, Maree Cheatham, Rey Valentin, Michael Cudlitz, Christopher Murray, Joaquín Garrido, Jack Conley, Tammin Sursok, Kevin Alejandro, Claudia Salinas, Alma Martinez, Gigi Rice, Jessica Tuck	
F E B R U A R Y	27	Echelon Conspiracy	After Dark Films	Dir.: Greg Marcks; Cast: Shane West, Edward Burns, Ving Rhames, Jonathan Pryce, Tamara Feldman, Martin Sheen	
F E B R U A R Y	27	Jonas Brothers: The 3D Concert Experience	Walt Disney Pictures	Bruce Hendricks (director); Kevin Jonas, Joe Jonas, Nick Jonas, Demi Lovato, Taylor Swift, Robert "Big Rob" Feggans, John Taylor, Jack Lawless, Ryan Liestman, Greg Garbowsky, Kevin Jonas Sr., Denise Jonas, Frankie Jonas	
F E B R U A R Y	27	Play the Game	Story Films	Marc Fienberg (director); Andy Griffith, Paul Campbell, Liz Sheridan, Doris Roberts, Marla Sokoloff	
F E B R U A R Y	27	Street Fighter: The Legend of Chun-Li	20th Century Fox / Hyde Park Entertainment / Capcom	Andrzej Bartkowiak (director); Justin Marks (screenplay); Kristin Kreuk, Chris Klein, Neal McDonough, Robin Shou, Moon Bloodgood, Josie Ho, Taboo, Michael Clarke Duncan, Edmund Chen, Pei Pei Cheng, Elizaveta Kiryukhina, Krystal Vee	
M A R C H	6	Phoebe in Wonderland	Thinkfilm	Daniel Barnz (director/screenplay); Felicity Huffman, Patricia Clarkson, Elle Fanning, Campbell Scott, Bill Pullman, Ian Colletti, Bailee Madison, Peter Gerety, Madhur Jaffrey, Maddie Corman, Max Baker, Austin Williams, Teala Dunn, Caitlin Sanchez, Marquis Rodriguez, Gracie Bea Lawrence, Tessa Albertson	
M A R C H	6	Sherman's Way	International Film Circuit	Craig Saavedra (director); James LeGros, Enrico Colantoni, Brooke Nevin, Donna Murphy	
M A R C H	6	Watchmen	Warner Bros. Pictures / Paramount Pictures / Legendary Pictures / DC Comics	Zack Snyder (director); David Hayter, Alex Tse (screenplay); Malin Åkerman, Billy Crudup, Matthew Goode, Carla Gugino, Jackie Earle Haley, Jeffrey Dean Morgan, Patrick Wilson, Matt Frewer, Stephen McHattie, Laura Mennell, Danny Woodburn, Greg Plitt, James Michael Connor, Robert Wisden, Jerry Wasserman, Frank Novak, Garry Chalk, Ron Fassler, Michael Kopsa, Fulvio Cecere, Ted Cole, Mark Acheson, Chris Gauthier, Jay Brazeau, Dan Payne, Niall Matter, Apollonia Vanova, Leah Gibson, Carrie Genzel, Greg Travis, Salli Saffioti, Sylvester Stallone	
M A R C H	13	Brothers at War	Samuel Goldwyn Films	Jake Rademacher (director)	
M A R C H	13	The Cake Eaters	7–57 Releasing	Mary Stuart Masterson (director); Jayce Bartok (screenplay); Kristen Stewart, Aaron Stanford, Bruce Dern, Elizabeth Ashley	
M A R C H	13	The Last House on the Left	Rogue Pictures	Dennis Iliadis (director); Adam Alleca, Carl Ellsworth (screenplay); Tony Goldwyn, Monica Potter, Garret Dillahunt, Aaron Paul, Spencer Treat Clark, Martha MacIsaac, Sara Paxton, Riki Lindhome, Michael Bowen, Josh Cox, Usha Khan	
M A R C H	13	Miss March	Fox Searchlight Pictures	Zach Cregger, Trevor Moore (directors/screenplay); Zach Cregger, Trevor Moore, Raquel Alessi, Molly Stanton, Craig Robinson, Hugh Hefner, Sara Jean Underwood, Carla Jimenez, Cedric Yarbrough, Eve Mauro, Windell Middlebrooks, Tanjareen Martin, Alex Donnelley, Seth Morris, Anthony Jeselnik, Carrie Keagan, Ashley Madison, Annie Ilonzeh, Melissa Ordway, Betsy Rue	
M A R C H	13	Race to Witch Mountain	Walt Disney Pictures	Andy Fickman (director); Matt Lopez, Mark Bomback (screenplay); Dwayne Johnson, AnnaSophia Robb, Alexander Ludwig, Carla Gugino, Ciarán Hinds, Tom Everett Scott, Chris Marquette, Billy Brown, Garry Marshall, Cheech Marin, Kim Richards, Ike Eisenmann, Tom Woodruff Jr., John Kassir, Bob Koherr, Bryan Fogel, Robert Torti, Jonathan Slavin, Ted Hartley, Meredith Salenger, Suzanne Krull, Christine Lakin, Omar Dorsey, Dennis Hayden, Eva Huang, William J. Birnes, Whitley Strieber, Brokedown Cadillac	
M A R C H	13	Severed Ways	Magnolia Pictures	Tony Stone (director); Tony Stone, Fiore Tedesco	
M A R C H	13	Sunshine Cleaning	Overture Films	Christine Jeffs (director); Megan Holley (screenplay); Amy Adams, Emily Blunt, Alan Arkin, Steve Zahn, Jason Spevack, Mary Lynn Rajskub, Clifton Collins Jr., Eric Christian Olsen, Paul Dooley, Kevin Chapman, Amy Redford, Anya Alyassin, Amber Midthunder, Maddie Corman	
M A R C H	18	Valentino: The Last Emperor	Truly Indie	Matt Tyrnauer (director); Giancarlo Giammetti, Valentino Garavani	
M A R C H	20	Duplicity	Universal Pictures / Relativity Media	Tony Gilroy (director/screenplay); Julia Roberts, Clive Owen, Tom Wilkinson, Paul Giamatti, Denis O'Hare, Kathleen Chalfant, Tom McCarthy, Carrie Preston, Christopher Denham, Oleg Shtefanko, Happy Anderson, Rick Worthy, Ulrich Thomsen, Billy Bob Thornton, Wayne Duvall	
M A R C H	20	The Great Buck Howard	Magnolia Pictures	Sean McGinly (director/screenplay); John Malkovich, Colin Hanks, Emily Blunt, Ricky Jay, Steve Zahn, Tom Hanks, Griffin Dunne, Matthew Gray Gubler, Debra Monk, Adam Scott, Patrick Fischler, Wallace Langham, Dave Attell, Don Most, Jonathan Ames, Sandy Martin, Stacey Travis, David Anthony Higgins, Kimberly Scott, Bill Saluga, Gary Coleman, Michael Winslow, Jack Carter, Martha Stewart, Damien Fahey, Conan O'Brien, Jon Stewart, David Blaine, Regis Philbin, Kelly Ripa, George Takei, Mary Hart, Jay Leno, Tom Arnold, Clap Your Hands Say Yeah	
M A R C H	20	I Love You, Man	DreamWorks Pictures	John Hamburg (director/screenplay); Larry Levin (screenplay); Paul Rudd, Jason Segel, Rashida Jones, Andy Samberg, Josh Cooke, J.K. Simmons, Jane Curtin, Jaime Pressly, Jon Favreau, Sarah Burns, Lou Ferrigno, Rob Huebel, Kym Whitley, Aziz Ansari, Nick Kroll, Mather Zickel, Thomas Lennon, Murray Gershenz, Joe Lo Truglio, Jay Chandrasekhar, Seth Morris, Jerry Minor, David Krumholtz, Liz Cackowski, Kulap Vilaysack, Catherine Reitman, Carla Gallo, Ethan Smith, Christopher Maleki, Nelson Franklin, Ping Wu, Matt Walsh, Larry Wilmore, Melissa Rauch, David Wain, Rush, OK Go	
M A R C H	20	Knowing	Summit Entertainment	Alex Proyas (director); Ryne Douglas Pearson, Juliet Snowden, Stiles White (screenplay); Nicolas Cage, Rose Byrne, Ben Mendelsohn, Chandler Canterbury, Lara Robinson, Nadia Townsend, Alan Hopgood, Benita Collings, Adrienne Pickering, Liam Hemsworth, Ra Chapman, Gareth Yuen, Alethea McGrath, Danielle Carter, Terry Camilleri, Lesley Anne Mitchell, Sam Velasquez, Verity Charlton, Tamara Donnellan, Travis Waite, D.G. Maloney, Joel Bow, Maximillian Paul, Karen Hadfield, David Lennie, Carolyn Shakespeare-Allen	
M A R C H	20	Sin Nombre	Focus Features	Cary Joji Fukunaga (director); Paulina Gaitán, Edgar Flores, Kristyan Ferrer, Tenoch Huerta Mejía, Diana García, Héctor Jiménez, Gerardo Taracena, Luis Fernando Peña	
M A R C H	20	Super Capers	Roadside Attractions	Ray Griggs (director); Justin Whalin, Danielle Harris, Tommy "Tiny" Lister, Michael Rooker, Adam West, Tom Sizemore	
M A R C H	27	12 Rounds	20th Century Fox / WWE Studios	Renny Harlin (director); Daniel Kunka (screenplay); John Cena, Aidan Gillen, Ashley Scott, Steve Harris, Brian J. White, Taylor Cole, Billy Slaughter, Peter "Navy" Tuiasosopo, Nick Gomez, Lara Grice, Robert Pralgo, Louis Herthum, Catherine Cavadini, John DeMita, Tanya Vidal Dublin, Greg Finley, Jeffrey Todd Fischer, Michael Ralph, Joel Swetow, Vincent Flood, Gonzalo Menendez, Travis Davis, Kimberly Bailey, Doug Burch, Judi Durand, Peggy Flood, Barbara Iley, Amad Jackson, Terence Matthews, Daniel Mora, Levi Nunez, Jason Pace, Richard Penn, Paige Pollack, David Randolph, Noreen Reardon, Vernon Scott, Cheryl Tyre Smith, Ruth Zalduondo, Renny Harlin	
M A R C H	27	The Cross	Gener8Xion Entertainment	Matthew Crouch (director); Arthur Blessitt	
M A R C H	27	The Education of Charlie Banks	Anchor Bay Entertainment	Fred Durst (director); Peter Elkoff (screenplay); Jesse Eisenberg, Jason Ritter, Christopher Marquette, Eva Amurri, Sebastian Stan, Gloria Votsis, Dennis Boutsikaris, Charles Parnell, Josh Richman, Sam Daly, Steven Hinkle, Miles Chandler, Cain Kerner	
M A R C H	27	The Haunting in Connecticut	Lionsgate / Gold Circle Films	Peter Cornwell (director); Adam Simon, Tim Metcalfe (screenplay); Virginia Madsen, Kyle Gallner, Martin Donovan, Amanda Crew, Elias Koteas, Ty Wood, D.W. Brown, Erik Berg, Sophi Knight, John Bluethner, John B. Lowe	
M A R C H	27	Monsters vs. Aliens	Paramount Pictures / DreamWorks Animation	Conrad Vernon, Rob Letterman (directors); Maya Forbes, Wallace Wolodarsky, Rob Letterman, Jonathan Aibel, Glenn Berger (screenplay); Reese Witherspoon, Seth Rogen, Hugh Laurie, Will Arnett, Kiefer Sutherland, Rainn Wilson, Paul Rudd, Renée Zellweger, Stephen Colbert, Julie White, Jeffrey Tambor, Amy Poehler, Ed Helms, John Krasinski, Conrad Vernon, Rob Letterman, Tom McGrath, Chris Miller, Mike Mitchell, Kent Osborne, Lisa Stewart, Sean Bishop, Rich B. Dietl, Stephen Kearin, Latifa Ouaou, Geoffrey Pomeroy, David P. Smith, David Koch	
M A R C H	27	Spinning into Butter	Screen Media Films	Mark Brokaw (director); Rebecca Gilman, Doug Atchison (screenplay); Sarah Jessica Parker, Beau Bridges, Miranda Richardson, Mykelti Williamson, Paul James, Victor Rasuk, Becky Ann Baker, Daniel Eric Gold, Richard Riehle, Peter Friedman, Emma Myles, Enver Gjokaj, Betsy Beutler, James Rebhorn, George Merritt, Linda Powell, Matt Servitto, Michelle Beck, Utkarsh Ambudkar, Orlagh Cassidy, Catherine Crier	

== April–June ==
Opening		Title	Production company	Cast and crew	Ref.
A P R I L	3	Adventureland	Miramax Films / Sidney Kimmel Entertainment	Greg Mottola (director/screenplay); Jesse Eisenberg, Kristen Stewart, Martin Starr, Bill Hader, Kristen Wiig, Ryan Reynolds, Margarita Levieva, Matt Bush, Wendie Malick, Jack Gilpin, Paige Howard, Josh Pais, Mary Birdsong, Michael Zegen, Eric Schaeffer, Dan Bittner, Barrett Hackney	
A P R I L	3	Alien Trespass	Roadside Attractions	R.W. Goodwin (director); Stephen P. Fisher (screenplay); Eric McCormack, Jenni Baird, Dan Lauria, Robert Patrick, Jody Thompson, Sarah Smyth, Chelah Horsdal, Sage Brocklebank, Jonathon Young, Tom McBeath, Aaron Brooks, Andrew Dunbar, Dayna Reid	
A P R I L	3	Bart Got a Room	Plum Pictures	Brian Hecker (director/screenplay); Steven J. Kaplan, Alia Shawkat, Cheryl Hines, William H. Macy, Ashley Benson, Brandon Hardesty, Kate Micucci, Jon Polito, Jennifer Tilly, Dinah Manoff, Katie McClellan, Michael Mantell, Chad Jamian Williams, Angelina Assereto, Sam Azouz	
A P R I L	3	C Me Dance	Freestyle Releasing	Greg Robbins (director); Christina DeMarco, Greg Robbins, Peter Kent	
A P R I L	3	Fast & Furious	Universal Pictures / Relativity Media / Original Film	Justin Lin (director); Chris Morgan (screenplay); Vin Diesel, Paul Walker, Jordana Brewster, Michelle Rodriguez, John Ortiz, Laz Alonso, Gal Gadot, Jack Conley, Shea Whigham, Liza Lapira, Sung Kang, Tego Calderon, Don Omar, Mirtha Michelle, Greg Cipes, Ron Yuan, Alejandro Patino, Joe Hursley, Neil Brown Jr., Brandon T. Jackson, Mousa Kraish, Robert Miano, Luis Moncada, Greg Collins, Monique Gabriela Curnen, Jimmy Lin, Roger Fan, Brendan Wayne, Assaf Cohen, Marco Rodríguez	
A P R I L	3	Gigantic	First Independent Pictures	Matt Aselton (director/screenplay); Adam Nagata (screenplay); Paul Dano, Zooey Deschanel, Edward Asner, Jane Alexander, John Goodman, Leven Rambin, Sharon Wilkins, Zach Galifianakis, Clarke Peters	
A P R I L	3	Sugar	Sony Pictures Classics	Anna Boden, Ryan Fleck (directors); Algenis Perez Soto, Karl Bury, Michael Gaston	
A P R I L	7	Scooby-Doo! and the Samurai Sword	Warner Home Video / Warner Premiere / Warner Bros. Animation	Christopher Berkeley (director); Joe Sichta (screenplay); Casey Kasem, Frank Welker, Mindy Cohn, Grey DeLisle, Kelly Hu, Kevin Michael Richardson, Sab Shimono, George Takei, Gedde Watanabe, Keone Young, Brian Cox	
A P R I L	8	Lymelife	Screen Media Films	Derick Martini (director/screenplay); Steven Martini (screenplay); Alec Baldwin, Rory Culkin, Emma Roberts, Jill Hennessy, Kieran Culkin, Timothy Hutton, Cynthia Nixon, Derick Martini, Steven Martini, Matthew Martini	
A P R I L	10	Dragonball Evolution	20th Century Fox	James Wong (director); Ben Ramsey (screenplay); Justin Chatwin, Chow Yun-fat, Emmy Rossum, Jamie Chung, James Marsters, Joon Park, Eriko Tamura, Randall Duk Kim, Ernie Hudson, Texas Battle, Megumi Seki, Ian Whyte, Luis Arrieta, Gabriela de la Garza, Shavon Kirksey	
A P R I L	10	Hannah Montana: The Movie	Walt Disney Pictures / It's a Laugh Productions	Peter Chelsom (director); Dan Berendsen (screenplay); Miley Cyrus, Billy Ray Cyrus, Emily Osment, Jason Earles, Mitchel Musso, Moisés Arias, Lucas Till, Vanessa L. Williams, Margo Martindale, Peter Gunn, Melora Hardin, Barry Bostwick, Beau Billingslea, Emily Grace Reaves, Jane Carr, Natalia Dyer, Adam Gregory, Taylor Swift, Rascal Flatts, Tyra Banks, Brandi Cyrus, Noah Cyrus, Anne Lockhart, Ajay Nayyar, Brooke Shields, Jared Carter, Katrina Hagger Smith, Rachel Woods, Brooke Bell	
A P R I L	10	In a Dream	IndiePix Films	Jeremiah Zagar (director)	
A P R I L	10	The Mysteries of Pittsburgh	Peace Arch Entertainment	Rawson M. Thurber (director/screenplay); Jon Foster, Sienna Miller, Peter Sarsgaard, Mena Suvari, Nick Nolte	
A P R I L	10	Observe and Report	Warner Bros. Pictures / Legendary Pictures	Jody Hill (director/screenplay); Seth Rogen, Anna Faris, Michael Peña, Ray Liotta, Collette Wolfe, Aziz Ansari, Dan Bakkedahl, Jesse Plemons, John Yuan, Matthew Yuan, Celia Weston, Randy Gambill, Patton Oswalt, Danny McBride, Lauren Miller, Alston Brown, Cody Midthunder	
A P R I L	17	17 Again	New Line Cinema	Burr Steers (director); Jason Filardi (screenplay); Zac Efron, Matthew Perry, Leslie Mann, Thomas Lennon, Michelle Trachtenberg, Melora Hardin, Sterling Knight, Adam Gregory, Hunter Parrish, Nicole Sullivan, Katerina Graham, Tiya Sircar, Melissa Ordway, Brian Doyle-Murray, Jim Gaffigan, Josie Loren, Collette Wolfe, Tommy Dewey, Linda Miller, Ellis Williams, Diana Maria Riva, Angee Hughes, Loren Lester, Margaret Cho, Larry Poindexter, Bubba Lewis, Tyler Steelman, Allison Miller, Gregory Sporleder, Vanessa Chester, Rachele Brooke Smith	
A P R I L	17	American Violet	Samuel Goldwyn Films	Tim Disney (director); Bill Haney (screenplay); Nicole Beharie, Tim Blake Nelson, Will Patton, Michael O'Keefe, Xzibit, Charles S. Dutton, Alfre Woodard, Malcolm Barrett, Tim Ware, David Warshofsky, Lucinda Jenney, Karimah Westbrook, Paul Guilfoyle, Anthony Mackie, Jerry Leggio, Louis Herthum, Lance E. Nichols	
A P R I L	17	Crank: High Voltage	Lionsgate	Mark Neveldine, Brian Taylor (directors/screenplay); Jason Statham, Amy Smart, Clifton Collins Jr., Efren Ramirez, Bai Ling, David Carradine, Dwight Yoakam, Geri Halliwell, Bai Ling, Art Hsu, Reno Wilson, Corey Haim, Keone Young, Julanne Chidi Hill, Jose Pablo Cantillo, Yeva-Genevieve Lavlinski, John de Lancie, Joseph Julian Soria, Jamie Harris, Billy Unger, Ron Jeremy, Ed Powers, Jenna Haze, Monique Alexander, Nick Manning, Lexington Steele, Chester Bennington, Michael Weston, Glenn Howerton, Joseph D. Reitman, Maynard James Keenan, Danny Lohner, Keith Jardine, Lauren Holly, Lloyd Kaufman	
A P R I L	17	Every Little Step	Sony Pictures Classics	James D. Stern & Adam Del Deo (directors); Michael Bennett, Donna McKechnie, Baayork Lee, Marvin Hamlisch, Bob Avian	
A P R I L	17	Sleep Dealer	Maya Entertainment	Alex Rivera (director); Luis Fernando Peña, Leonor Varela, Jacob Vargas	
A P R I L	17	State of Play	Universal Pictures / Working Title Films / StudioCanal / Relativity Media	Kevin Macdonald (director); Matthew Michael Carnahan, Tony Gilroy, Billy Ray (screenplay); Russell Crowe, Ben Affleck, Rachel McAdams, Helen Mirren, Robin Wright Penn, Jason Bateman, Jeff Daniels, Michael Berresse, Harry Lennix, Josh Mostel, Michael Weston, Barry Shabaka Henley, Viola Davis, David Harbour, Steve Park, Brennan Brown, Maria Thayer, Wendy Makkena, Zoe Lister-Jones, Michael Jace, Rob Benedict, Katy Mixon, Gregg Binkley, Chris Matthews, Lou Dobbs, James Vance III, Ashley Bell, Margaret Carlson, Steve Clemons, E.J. Dionne Jr., Katty Kay, John Palmer, Bob Schieffer, Bob Woodward	
A P R I L	18	Grey Gardens	HBO Films	Michael Sucsy (director/screenplay); Patricia Rozema (screenplay); Drew Barrymore, Jessica Lange, Jeanne Tripplehorn, Malcolm Gets, Daniel Baldwin, Ken Howard, Arye Gross, Justin Louis, Kenneth Welsh, Arnold Pinnock, Louis Grise, Joshua Peace, Neil Babcock, Ben Carlson, Olivia Waldriff	
A P R I L	22	Earth	Disneynature	Alastair Fothergill (director); James Earl Jones	
A P R I L	24	Fighting	Rogue Pictures / Relativity Media	Dito Montiel (director/screenplay); Robert Munic (screenplay); Channing Tatum, Terrence Howard, Luis Guzmán, Zulay Henao, Brian J. White, Flaco Navaja, Cung Le, Roger Guenveur Smith, Anthony DeSando, Danny Mastrogiorgio, Peter Tambakis, Michael Rivera, Dante Nero	
A P R I L	24	Frequently Asked Questions About Time Travel	Picturehouse Entertainment	Gareth Carrivick (director); Chris O'Dowd, Dean Lennox Kelly, Marc Wootton, Anna Faris	
A P R I L	24	The Informers	Senator Entertainment	Gregor Jordan (director); Billy Bob Thornton, Winona Ryder, Kim Basinger, Mickey Rourke, Brad Renfro, Amber Heard, Aaron Himelstein	
A P R I L	24	Mutant Chronicles	Magnet Releasing	Simon Hunter (director); Thomas Jane, Ron Perlman, John Malkovich	
A P R I L	24	Obsessed	Screen Gems / Rainforest Films	Steve Shill (director); David Loughery (screenplay); Idris Elba, Beyoncé Knowles, Ali Larter, Jerry O'Connell, Christine Lahti, Bruce McGill, Scout Taylor-Compton, Matthew Humphreys, Richard Ruccolo, Ron Rogge, Nathan and Nicolas Myers	
A P R I L	24	The Soloist	DreamWorks Pictures / Universal Pictures / Participant Media	Joe Wright (director); Susannah Grant (screenplay); Jamie Foxx, Robert Downey Jr., Catherine Keener, Tom Hollander, LisaGay Hamilton, Nelsan Ellis, Rachael Harris, Stephen Root, Lorraine Toussaint, Patrick Tatten, Ilia Volok, Michael Bunin, Jena Malone, Octavia Spencer, Lemon Andersen, Noel G., Alejandro Patino, Artel Great, Justin Martin	
A P R I L	24	Tyson	Sony Pictures Classics	James Toback (director/screenplay); Mike Tyson	
M A Y	1	Battle for Terra	Lionsgate / Roadside Attractions	Aristomenis Tsirbas (director); Evan Spiliotopoulos (screenplay); Evan Rachel Wood, Brian Cox, James Garner, Chris Evans, Danny Glover, Amanda Peet, David Cross, Justin Long, Dennis Quaid, Luke Wilson, Mark Hamill, Danny Trejo, Ron Perlman, Chad Allen, Rosanna Arquette, Beverly D'Angelo, David Krumholtz, Brooke Bloom, Alec Holden, Phil LaMarr, Laraine Newman	
M A Y	1	Ghosts of Girlfriends Past	New Line Cinema	Mark Waters (director); Jon Lucas, Scott Moore (screenplay); Matthew McConaughey, Jennifer Garner, Michael Douglas, Breckin Meyer, Lacey Chabert, Robert Forster, Anne Archer, Emma Stone, Daniel Sunjata, Noureen DeWulf, Rachel Boston, Camille Guaty, Amanda Walsh, Christina Milian, Emily Foxler, Noa Tishby, Logan Miller, Christa B. Allen, Olga Maliouk, Devin Brochu, Kasey Russell	
M A Y	1	The Limits of Control	Focus Features	Jim Jarmusch (director/screenplay); Isaach de Bankolé, Hiam Abbass, Gael García Bernal, Paz de la Huerta, Alex Descas, John Hurt, Youki Kudoh, Bill Murray, Jean-François Stévenin, Tilda Swinton, Luis Tosar	
M A Y	1	The Merry Gentleman	Samuel Goldwyn Films	Michael Keaton (director); Ron Lazzeretti (screenplay); Michael Keaton, Kelly Macdonald, Bobby Cannavale, Tom Bastounes, David Dino Wells Jr., Darlene Hunt, Guy van Swearingen, William Dick, Mike Bradecich, Debbi Burns, Maritza Cabrera	
M A Y	1	The Skeptic	IFC Films	Tennyson Bardwell (director); Tim Daly, Zoe Saldaña, Tom Arnold, Andrea Roth	
M A Y	1	X-Men Origins: Wolverine	20th Century Fox / Marvel Entertainment	Gavin Hood (director); David Benioff, James Vanderbilt, Scott Silver (screenplay); Hugh Jackman, Liev Schreiber, Danny Huston, Dominic Monaghan, Ryan Reynolds, Lynn Collins, Taylor Kitsch, Will.i.am, Kevin Durand, Daniel Henney, Tim Pocock, Max Cullen, Julia Blake, Troye Sivan, Michael-James Olsen, Aaron Jeffery, Peter O'Brien, Asher Keddie, Tahyna Tozzi, Daniel Negreanu, Hakeem Kae-Kazim, Mike Dopud, Scott Adkins, Patrick Stewart	
M A Y	8	The Garden	Oscilloscope Laboratories	Scott Hamilton Kennedy (director)	
M A Y	8	Julia	Magnolia Pictures	Erick Zonca (director/screenplay); Michael Collins, Aude Py (screenplay); Tilda Swinton, Aidan Gould, Saul Rubinek, Kate del Castillo, Jude Ciccolella, Bruno Bichir, Kevin Kilner, Ezra Buzzington, Eugene Byrd, Horacio Garcia Rojas, John Bellucci, Roger Cudney, Neko Parham	
M A Y	8	Love N' Dancing	Screen Media Films	Robert Iscove (director); Tom Malloy (screenplay); Amy Smart, Tom Malloy, Billy Zane, Betty White, Caroline Rhea, Maulik Pancholy, Leila Arcieri, Benji Schwimmer, Rachel Dratch, Tatiana Mollmann, Ross Kelly, Gregory Harrison, Catherine Mary Stewart, Nicola Royston	
M A Y	8	Next Day Air	Summit Entertainment	Benny Boom (director); Blair Cobbs (screenplay); Donald Faison, Mike Epps, Wood Harris, Omari Hardwick, Darius McCrary, Yasmin Deliz, Mos Def, Emilio Rivera, Lauren London, Debbie Allen, Jo D. Jonz, Shawn Michael Howard, Peedi Crakk, Lombardo Boyar, Cassidy, Cisco Reyes, Lobo Sebastian, Malik Barnhardt	
M A Y	8	Outrage	Magnolia Pictures	Kirby Dick (director)	
M A Y	8	Powder Blue	Speakeasy Releasing	Timothy Linh Bui (director); Jessica Biel, Forest Whitaker, Patrick Swayze, Ray Liotta, Lisa Kudrow	
M A Y	8	Star Trek	Paramount Pictures / Spyglass Entertainment / Bad Robot	J. J. Abrams (director); Alex Kurtzman, Roberto Orci (screenplay); Chris Pine, Zachary Quinto, Karl Urban, Zoe Saldaña, Simon Pegg, John Cho, Anton Yelchin, Eric Bana, Bruce Greenwood, Leonard Nimoy, Ben Cross, Winona Ryder, Clifton Collins Jr., Chris Hemsworth, Jennifer Morrison, Rachel Nichols, Faran Tahir, Deep Roy, Tyler Perry, Victor Garber, Freda Foh Shen, Akiva Goldsman, Greg Ellis, Amanda Foreman, Spencer Daniels, Paul McGillion, James Cawley, Pavel Lychnikoff, Lucia Rijker, W. Morgan Sheppard, Wil Wheaton, Randy Pausch, Majel Barrett	
M A Y	15	Angels & Demons	Columbia Pictures / Imagine Entertainment / Skylark Productions	Ron Howard (director); Akiva Goldsman (screenplay); Tom Hanks, Ewan McGregor, Ayelet Zurer, Stellan Skarsgård, Pierfrancesco Favino, Nikolaj Lie Kaas, Armin Mueller-Stahl, Thure Lindhardt, David Pasquesi, Cosimo Fusco, Victor Alfieri, Carmen Argenziano, Bob Yerkes, Curt Lowens, Anna Katarina, Rance Howard, Steve Franken, Elya Baskin, August Wittgenstein, Norbert Weisser, Marco Florini, Franklin Amobi, Todd Schneider, Howard Mungo, Gino Conforti	
M A Y	15	The Brothers Bloom	Summit Entertainment	Rian Johnson (director/screenplay); Rachel Weisz, Adrien Brody, Mark Ruffalo, Rinko Kikuchi, Maximilian Schell, Robbie Coltrane, Ricky Jay, Andy Nyman, Noah Segan, Nora Zehetner, Ram Bergman, Max Records, Zachary Gordon, Stefan Kapicic, Joseph Gordon-Levitt, Lukas Haas	
M A Y	15	Management	Samuel Goldwyn Films	Stephen Belber (director/screenplay); Jennifer Aniston, Steve Zahn, Woody Harrelson, Fred Ward, Margo Martindale, James Hiroyuki Liao, Kevin Heffernan, Mark Boone Junior, Josh Lucas, Dominic Fumusa, Tzi Ma	
M A Y	15	Not Forgotten	Anchor Bay Films	Dror Soref (director/screenplay); Tomas Romero (screenplay); Simon Baker, Paz Vega, Claire Forlani, Chloë Grace Moretz, Ken Davitian, Michael DeLorenzo, Julia Vera, Virginia Periera	
M A Y	17	Make the Yuletide Gay	Guest House Films	Rob Williams (director); Keith Jordan, Adamo Ruggiero, Hallee Hirsh	
M A Y	19	Dr. Dolittle: Million Dollar Mutts	20th Century Fox Home Entertainment / Davis Entertainment	Alex Zamm (director); Daniel Altiere, Steven Altiere (screenplay); Kyla Pratt, Tegan Moss, Brandon Jay McLaren, Judge Reinhold, Jay Brazeau, Maxine Miller, Sebastian Spence, Doron Bell Jr., Matthew Harrison, Norm Macdonald, Jaime Ray Newman, Phil Proctor, Greg Ellis, Fred Stoller, Pauly Shore, Jeff Bennett, Vicki Lewis, Stephen Root, Greg Proops, Jason Bryden, Karen Holness, Curtis Caravaggio	
M A Y	21	Terminator Salvation	Warner Bros. Pictures / The Halcyon Company	McG (director); John Brancato, Michael Ferris (screenplay); Christian Bale, Sam Worthington, Anton Yelchin, Moon Bloodgood, Bryce Dallas Howard, Common, Jane Alexander, Helena Bonham Carter, Michael Ironside, Jadagrace Berry, Ivan G'Vera, Chris Browning, Greg Serano, Treva Etienne, Michael Papajohn, Chris Ashworth, Greg Plitt, Terry Crews, Zach McGowan, Roland Kickinger, Brian Steele, Linda Hamilton	
M A Y	22	Dance Flick	Paramount Pictures / MTV Films	Damien Dante Wayans (director/screenplay); Keenen Ivory Wayans, Shawn Wayans, Marlon Wayans, Craig Wayans (screenplay); Shoshana Bush, Damon Wayans Jr., Essence Atkins, Affion Crockett, Shawn Wayans, Amy Sedaris, David Alan Grier, Chelsea Makela, Chris Elliott, Brennan Hillard, Lochlyn Munro, Christina Murphy, Marlon Wayans, Kim Wayans, Keenen Ivory Wayans, Craig Wayans, Ross Thomas, George Gore II, Tichina Arnold, Lauren Bowles, Sufe Bradshaw, Andrew McFarlane, Casey Lee, Chaunté Wayans, Terry Rhoads, Corey Holcomb, Page Kennedy, Heather McDonald	
M A Y	22	Easy Virtue	Sony Pictures Classics	Stephan Elliott (director/screenplay); Sheridan Jobbins (screenplay); Jessica Biel, Colin Firth, Kristin Scott Thomas, Ben Barnes, Kimberley Nixon, Katherine Parkinson, Kris Marshall, Christian Brassington, Charlotte Riley, Jim McManus, Pip Torrens, Georgie Glen, Stephan Elliott, Sheridan Jobbins	
M A Y	22	The Girlfriend Experience	Magnolia Pictures	Steven Soderbergh (director); Brian Koppelman, David Levien (screenplay); Sasha Grey, Chris Santos, Philip Eytan, Timothy Davis, Glenn Kenny, Peter Zizzo, Vincent Dellacera, Kimberly Magness, Mark Jacobson	
M A Y	22	Night at the Museum: Battle of the Smithsonian	20th Century Fox / 21 Laps Entertainment / 1492 Pictures	Shawn Levy (director); Robert Ben Garant, Thomas Lennon (screenplay); Ben Stiller, Amy Adams, Owen Wilson, Hank Azaria, Robin Williams, Christopher Guest, Alain Chabat, Steve Coogan, Ricky Gervais, Bill Hader, Jon Bernthal, Patrick Gallagher, Jake Cherry, Rami Malek, Mizuo Peck, Jonas Brothers, Jay Baruchel, Mindy Kaling, Keith Powell, Craig Robinson, Clint Howard, George Foreman, Caroll Spinney, Shawn Levy, Eugene Levy, Brad Garrett, Thomas Lennon, Robert Ben Garant, Ed Helms, Jonah Hill, Frankie Jonas, Crystal the Monkey	
M A Y	29	Drag Me to Hell	Universal Pictures / Ghost House Pictures	Sam Raimi (director/screenplay); Ivan Raimi (screenplay); Alison Lohman, Justin Long, Lorna Raver, Dileep Rao, Jessica Lucas, David Paymer, Adriana Barraza, Bojana Novakovic, Reggie Lee, Chelcie Ross, Molly Cheek, Octavia Spencer, Fernanda Romero, Joanne Baron, Ted Raimi, Scott Spiegel, Christopher Young, Alex Veadov, Art Kimbro, Sam Raimi	
M A Y	29	The Maiden Heist	Yari Productions	Peter Hewitt (director); Michael LeSieur (screenplay); Morgan Freeman, Christopher Walken, William H. Macy, Marcia Gay Harden, Breckin Meyer, Wynn Everett, Christy Scott Cashman	
M A Y	29	Up	Walt Disney Pictures / Pixar Animation Studios	Pete Docter (director/screenplay); Bob Peterson (screenplay); Ed Asner, Christopher Plummer, Jordan Nagai, Bob Peterson, Delroy Lindo, Jerome Ranft, John Ratzenberger, David Kaye, Danny Mann, Don Fullilove, Jess Harnell, Josh Cooley, Pete Docter, Mark Andrews, Bob Bergen, Brenda Chapman, John Cygan, Paul Eiding, Teresa Ganzel, Sherry Lynn, Laraine Newman, Teddy Newton, Jeff Pidgeon, Jan Rabson, Sebastian Warholm, Elie Docter, Jeremy Leary, Mickie T. McGowan	
M A Y	29	What Goes Up	3 Kings Productions	Jonathan Glatzer (director/screenplay); Robert Lawson (screenplay); Steve Coogan, Hilary Duff, Josh Peck, Olivia Thirlby, Molly Shannon, Arturo Peniche, Manuel Ojeda, Cesar Evora, Molly Price, Sarah Lind, Francisco Gattorno, Angelica Rivera, Laura Konechny, Andrea Brooks, Ingrid Nilson, Brenna O'Brien, Max Hoffman	
M A Y	31	Into the Storm	HBO Films / BBC Films / Scott Free / Rainmark Films	Thaddeus O'Sullivan (director); Hugh Whitemore (screenplay); Brendan Gleeson, Janet McTeer, James D'Arcy, Patrick Malahide, Robert Pugh, Adrian Scarborough, Clive Mantle, Jack Shepherd, Donald Sumpter, Iain Glen, Bill Paterson, Bruce Alexander, Michael Elwyn, Terrence Hardiman, Garrick Hagon, Len Cariou, Geoffrey Kirkness, Philip McGough, Michael Pennington, Aleksey Petrenko	
J U N E	5	After Last Season	Index Square	Mark Region (director); Jason Kulas, Peggy McClellan, Scott Winters	
J U N E	5	Away We Go	Focus Features	Sam Mendes (director); Dave Eggers, Vendela Vida (screenplay); Maya Rudolph, John Krasinski, Jeff Daniels, Catherine O'Hara, Chris Messina, Melanie Lynskey, Paul Schneider, Carmen Ejogo, Maggie Gyllenhaal, Josh Hamilton, Allison Janney, Jim Gaffigan	
J U N E	5	The Hangover	Warner Bros. Pictures / Legendary Pictures / Green Hat Films	Todd Phillips (director); Jon Lucas, Scott Moore (screenplay); Bradley Cooper, Ed Helms, Zach Galifianakis, Justin Bartha, Heather Graham, Sasha Barrese, Jeffrey Tambor, Ken Jeong, Rachael Harris, Mike Tyson, Mike Epps, Jernard Burks, Rob Riggle, Cleo King, Bryan Callen, Matt Walsh, Ian Anthony Dale, Michael Li, Sondra Currie, Gillian Vigman, Nathalie Fay, Dan Finnerty & The Dan Band, Brody Stevens, Todd Phillips, Mike Vallely, James Martin Kelly, Murray Gershenz, Lucinda Jenney, Carrie Keagan, Wayne Newton, Carrot Top	
J U N E	5	Land of the Lost	Universal Pictures / Relativity Media / Mosaic Media Group	Brad Silberling (director); Chris Henchy, Dennis McNicholas (screenplay); Will Ferrell, Anna Friel, Danny McBride, Jorma Taccone, John Boylan, Matt Lauer, Leonard Nimoy, Bobb'e J. Thompson, Sierra McCormick, Brian Huskey, Chris Henchy, Douglas Tait, Paul Adelstein, Mousa Kraish, Raymond Ochoa, Michael Papajohn, Kiernan Shipka, Dylan Sprayberry, Dennis McNicholas, Adam Behr, Daamen J. Krall	
J U N E	5	My Life in Ruins	Fox Searchlight Pictures	Donald Petrie (director); Mike Reiss (screenplay); Nia Vardalos, Richard Dreyfuss, Alexis Georgoulis, Alistair McGowan, Harland Williams, Rachel Dratch, Caroline Goodall, Ian Ogilvy, Sophie Stuckey, María Botto, María Adánez, Brian Palermo, Jareb Dauplaise, Ralph Nossek, Rita Wilson, Ian Gomez, Simon Gleeson, Natalie O'Donnell, Sheila Bernette, Bernice Stegers	
J U N E	5	Tennessee	Vivendi Entertainment	Aaron Woodley (director); Russell Schaumberg (screenplay); Ethan Peck, Adam Rothenberg, Mariah Carey, Lance Reddick, Michelle Harris, Bill Sage, Melissa Benoist, Boots Southerland	
J U N E	12	Food, Inc.	Magnolia Pictures	Robert Kenner (director/screenplay); Elise Pearlstein, Kim Roberts (screenplay); Eric Schlosser, Michael Pollan, Diana DeGette, Phil English, Gary Hirshberg, Joel Salatin, Patricia Buck, Vince Edwards, Larry Johnson, William P. Kealey, Barbara Kowalcyk, Richard Lobb, Carole Morison, Gonzalez Family, Moe Parr, Eduardo Pena, Stephen R. Pennell, Michael Renov, Eldon Roth, Troy Rousch, David Runyon, Rosa Soto, Allen Trenkle	
J U N E	12	Imagine That	Paramount Pictures / Nickelodeon Movies	Karey Kirkpatrick (director); Ed Solomon, Chris Matheson (screenplay); Eddie Murphy, Thomas Haden Church, Yara Shahidi, Nicole Ari Parker, Ronny Cox, Martin Sheen, Stephen Root, Richard Schiff, Marin Hinkle, Stephen Rannazzisi, DeRay Davis, Vanessa Estelle Williams, Lauren Weedman, Timm Sharp, Bobb'e J. Thompson, Michael McMillian, Catherine McGoohan, James Patrick Stuart, Tonita Castro, Jonathan Mangum, Kent Shocknek, Robb Derringer, Moira Quirk, Allen Iverson, Carmelo Anthony, George Karl, Mel Harris, Traci Paige Johnson, Donovan Patton, Grace Rolek, Heidi Marnhout, John DeVito, Mia Ford, Jennessa Rose, Stephen Stanton	
J U N E	12	Moon	Sony Pictures Classics	Duncan Jones (director); Nathan Parker (screenplay); Sam Rockwell, Kevin Spacey, Dominique McElligott, Kaya Scodelario, Benedict Wong, Matt Berry, Malcolm Stewart, Robin Chalk	
J U N E	12	Sex Positive	Here! Films	Daryl Wein (director); Richard Berkowitz, Don Adler, Dotty Berkowitz, Susan Brown, Dr. Demetre Daskalakis, Richard Dworkin, William A. Haseltine, Larry Kramer, Ardele Lister, Michael Lucas, Francisco Roque, Gabriel Rotello, Joseph Sonnabend, Dr. Bill Stackhouse, Krishna Stone, Sean Strub, Edmund White	
J U N E	12	The Taking of Pelham 123	Columbia Pictures / Metro-Goldwyn-Mayer / Relativity Media / Escape Artists / Scott Free Productions	Tony Scott (director); David Koepp (screenplay); Denzel Washington, John Travolta, John Turturro, Luis Guzmán, Michael Rispoli, James Gandolfini, Ramón Rodríguez, John Benjamin Hickey, Gary Basaraba, Gbenga Akinnagbe, Katherine Sigismund, Jake Siciliano, Aunjanue Ellis, Alex Kaluzhsky, Tonye Patano, Jason Butler Harner, Victor Gojcaj, Robert Vataj, Sean Nelson, Frank Wood, Brian Haley, Maria Bartiromo, Chance Kelly, Nick Loren, Adrian Martinez, Jordan Gelber, Jason Cerbone	
J U N E	19	The Proposal	Touchstone Pictures / Mandeville Films	Anne Fletcher (director); Pete Chiarelli (screenplay); Sandra Bullock, Ryan Reynolds, Mary Steenburgen, Craig T. Nelson, Betty White, Denis O'Hare, Oscar Nunez, Malin Åkerman, Michael Nouri, Aasif Mandvi, Michael Mosley, Gregg Edelman, Anne Fletcher, Niecy Nash	
J U N E	19	Whatever Works	Sony Pictures Classics	Woody Allen (director/screenplay); Ed Begley, Jr., Patricia Clarkson, Larry David, Conleth Hill, Michael McKean, Evan Rachel Wood, Henry Cavill, John Gallagher Jr., Jessica Hecht, Carolyn McCormick, Christopher Evan Welch, Olek Krupa, Adam Brooks, Lyle Kanouse, Samantha Bee	
J U N E	19	Year One	Columbia Pictures	Harold Ramis (director/screenplay); Gene Stupnitsky, Lee Eisenberg (screenplay); Jack Black, Michael Cera, Oliver Platt, David Cross, Christopher Mintz-Plasse, Vinnie Jones, Hank Azaria, Olivia Wilde, Juno Temple, June Diane Raphael, Xander Berkeley, Gia Carides, Horatio Sanz, David Pasquesi, Matthew J. Willig, Harold Ramis, Rhoda Griffis, Gabriel Sunday, Eden Riegel, Kyle Gass, Bill Hader, Marshall Manesh, Paul Scheer, Paul Rudd, Bryan Massey, Gene Stupnitsky, Lee Eisenberg, Rick Overton	
J U N E	24	Transformers: Revenge of the Fallen	DreamWorks Pictures / Paramount Pictures	Michael Bay (director); Ehren Kruger, Roberto Orci, Alex Kurtzman (screenplay); Shia LaBeouf, Megan Fox, Josh Duhamel, Tyrese Gibson, John Turturro, Ramón Rodríguez, Kevin Dunn, Julie White, Isabel Lucas, John Benjamin Hickey, Glenn Morshower, Matthew Marsden, Rainn Wilson, Michael Papajohn, Andrew Howard, Katie Lowes, America Olivo, Aaron Hill, Jareb Dauplaise, Christopher Curry, Cas Anvar, Michael Benyaer, Deep Roy, Spencer Garrett, Eric Pierpoint, Annie Korzen, David Bowe, Aaron Lustig, Kristen Welker, Alex Fernandez, Marc Evan Jackson, Josh Kelly, Matt Iseman, Peter Cullen, Hugo Weaving, Tony Todd, Mark Ryan, Jess Harnell, Robert Foxworth, Charlie Adler, Frank Welker, André Sogliuzzo, Tom Kenny, Reno Wilson, Grey DeLisle, Michael York, Kevin Michael Richardson, Robin Atkin Downes	
J U N E	26	The Hurt Locker	Summit Entertainment	Kathryn Bigelow (director); Mark Boal (screenplay); Jeremy Renner, Anthony Mackie, Brian Geraghty, Christian Camargo, Guy Pearce, Ralph Fiennes, Evangeline Lilly, David Morse	
J U N E	26	My Sister's Keeper	New Line Cinema	Nick Cassavetes (director/screenplay); Jeremy Leven (screenplay); Cameron Diaz, Abigail Breslin, Alec Baldwin, Jason Patric, Sofia Vassilieva, Joan Cusack, Thomas Dekker, Heather Wahlquist, David Thornton, Evan Ellingson, Nicole Marie Lenz, Emily Deschanel, Annie Wood, Mark Johnson, E.G. Daily, Rick Salomon, Lin Shaye, Ellia English, Mary Jo Deschanel, Michael Chow	
J U N E	26	The Stoning of Soraya M.	Roadside Attractions	Cyrus Nowrasteh (director/screenplay); Betsy Giffen Nowrasteh (screenplay); Shohreh Aghdashloo, Jim Caviezel, Navid Negahban, Mozhan Marnò, Parviz Sayyad, Vida Ghahremani, Vachik Mangassarian, Bita Sheibani	
J U N E	26	Surveillance	Magnolia Pictures	Jennifer Lynch (director/screenplay); Kent Miller (screenplay); Julia Ormond, Bill Pullman, Pell James, Ryan Simpkins, Michael Ironside, French Stewart, Caroline Aaron, Hugh Dillon, Cheri Oteri, Gill Gayle, Kent Harper, Mac Miller, Charlie Newmark, Anita Smith, Josh Strait, Kent Nolan, Kyle Briere	

== July–September ==
Opening		Title	Production company	Cast and crew	Ref.
J U L Y	1	Ice Age: Dawn of the Dinosaurs	20th Century Fox / Blue Sky Studios	Carlos Saldanha (director); Michael Berg, Peter Ackerman, Mike Reiss, Yoni Brenner (screenplay): Ray Romano, John Leguizamo, Denis Leary, Queen Latifah, Seann William Scott, Josh Peck, Simon Pegg, Chris Wedge, Karen Disher, Bill Hader, Joey King, Jane Lynch, Kristen Wiig, Eunice Cho, Maile Flanagan, Clea Lewis, Matt Adler, Selenis Leyva, Beatrice Miller, Regan Mizrahi, Devika Parikh, Frank Welker	
J U L Y	1	Public Enemies	Universal Pictures / Relativity Media	Michael Mann (director/screenplay); Ronan Bennett, Ann Biderman (screenplay); Johnny Depp, Christian Bale, Marion Cotillard, Billy Crudup, Stephen Dorff, Stephen Lang, Channing Tatum, Giovanni Ribisi, David Wenham, Branka Katić, Leelee Sobieski, Michael Bentt, Stephen Graham, Jason Clarke, Spencer Garrett, Christian Stolte, John Ortiz, Domenick Lombardozzi, Rory Cochrane, Carey Mulligan, Emilie de Ravin, Matt Craven, Lili Taylor, Diana Krall, André Sogliuzzo, Bill Camp, James Russo, Don Harvey	
J U L Y	3	I Hate Valentine's Day	IFC Films	Nia Vardalos (director/screenplay); Nia Vardalos, John Corbett, Stephen Guarino, Amir Arison, Zoe Kazan, Gary Wilmes, Mike Starr, Jason Mantzoukas, Judah Friedlander, Rachel Dratch, Jay O. Sanders, Lynda Gravatt, Suzanne Shepherd, Dan Finnerty, Ward Horton, Isiah Whitlock Jr., Rose Abdoo, Ian Gomez, Ben Schwartz, John Tormey	
J U L Y	10	Blood: The Last Vampire	Samuel Goldwyn Films	Chris Nahon (director); Chris Chow (screenplay); Gianna Jun, Allison Miller, Masiela Lusha, JJ Feild, Koyuki, Liam Cunningham, Yasuaki Kurata, Larry Lamb, Andrew Pleavin, Michael Byrne, Colin Salmon, Ailish O'Connor, Constantine Gregory, Joey Anaya, Khary Payton	
J U L Y	10	Brüno	Universal Pictures / Media Rights Capital / Four By Two Films	Larry Charles (director); Sacha Baron Cohen, Anthony Hines, Dan Mazer, Jeff Schaffer (screenplay); Sacha Baron Cohen, Gustaf Hammarsten, Bono, Chris Martin, Snoop Dogg, Elton John, Ron Paul, Paula Abdul, Richard Bey, Harrison Ford, Brittny Gastineau, La Toya Jackson, Yossi Alpher, Ghassan Khatib, Al-Aqsa Martyrs' Brigades, Sting, Slash, Clifford Bañagale, Josh Meyers, Miguel Sandoval, Paul McCartney, Fabrice Morvan, Avraham Sela	
J U L Y	10	Humpday	Magnolia Pictures	Lynn Shelton (director/screenplay); Mark Duplass, Joshua Leonard, Alycia Delmore, Lynn Shelton	
J U L Y	10	I Love You, Beth Cooper	20th Century Fox / 1492 Pictures	Chris Columbus (director); Larry Doyle (screenplay); Hayden Panettiere, Paul Rust, Lauren London, Lauren Storm, Shawn Roberts, Jared Keeso, Brendan Penny, Marie Avgeropoulos, Alan Ruck, Cynthia Stevenson, Pat Finn, Andrea Savage, Samm Levine, Ellie Harvie, Emily Tennant, Jack Carpenter	
J U L Y	10	Soul Power	Sony Pictures Classics	Jeff Levy-Hinte (director)	
J U L Y	15	Harry Potter and the Half-Blood Prince	Warner Bros. Pictures / Heyday Films	David Yates (director); Steve Kloves (screenplay); Daniel Radcliffe, Rupert Grint, Emma Watson, Michael Gambon, Alan Rickman, Maggie Smith, Jim Broadbent, Robbie Coltrane, Helena Bonham Carter, David Thewlis, Julie Walters, Helen McCrory, Mark Williams, Timothy Spall, Warwick Davis, Natalia Tena, Gemma Jones, Bonnie Wright, Evanna Lynch, Devon Murray, David Bradley, Tom Felton, Freddie Stroma, Geraldine Somerville, Hero Fiennes Tiffin, Ralph Ineson, Joerg Stadler, Jessie Cave, Matthew Lewis, James Phelps, Oliver Phelps, Alfred Enoch, Afshan Azad, Shefali Chowdhury, Katie Leung, Dave Legeno	
J U L Y	17	(500) Days of Summer	Fox Searchlight Pictures	Marc Webb (director); Scott Neustadter, Michael H. Weber (screenplay); Joseph Gordon-Levitt, Zooey Deschanel, Geoffrey Arend, Chloë Grace Moretz, Matthew Gray Gubler, Clark Gregg, Patricia Belcher, Rachel Boston, Minka Kelly, Valente Rodriguez, Yvette Nicole Brown, Maile Flanagan, Darryl Sivad, Richard McGonagle	
J U L Y	17	Death in Love	Screen Media Films	Boaz Yakin (director); Jacqueline Bisset, Adam Brody, Josh Lucas, Lukas Haas	
J U L Y	17	Homecoming	Animus Films	Morgan J. Freeman (director); Mischa Barton, Matt Long, Jessica Stroup	
J U L Y	24	The Answer Man	Magnolia Pictures	John Hindman (director/screenplay); Jeff Daniels, Lauren Graham, Lou Taylor Pucci, Olivia Thirlby, Kat Dennings, Thomas Roy, Nora Dunn, Max Antisell, Tony Hale, Annie Corley, Peter Patrikios, Richard Barlow, Sylvia Kauders, Morgan Turner	
J U L Y	24	G-Force	Walt Disney Pictures / Jerry Bruckheimer Films	Hoyt Yeatman (director); Marianne Wibberley, Cormac Wibberley (screenplay); Nicolas Cage, Sam Rockwell, Jon Favreau, Penélope Cruz, Steve Buscemi, Tracy Morgan, Bill Nighy, Will Arnett, Zach Galifianakis, Kelli Garner, Tyler Patrick Jones, Piper Mackenzie Harris, Jack Conley, Niecy Nash, Justin Mentell, Gabriel Casseus, Loudon Wainwright III, Chris Ellis, James Huang, Michael Papajohn, Dee Bradley Baker, Hoyt Yeatman IV, Max Favreau	
J U L Y	24	Orphan	Warner Bros. Pictures / Dark Castle Entertainment	Jaume Collet-Serra (director); David Leslie Johnson (screenplay); Vera Farmiga, Peter Sarsgaard, Isabelle Fuhrman, CCH Pounder, Jimmy Bennett, Margo Martindale, Karel Roden, Aryana Engineer, Rosemary Dunsmore, Genelle Williams, Sugith Varughese	
J U L Y	24	Shrink	Ignite Entertainment	Jonas Pate (director); Thomas Moffett (screenplay); Kevin Spacey, Mark Webber, Keke Palmer, Saffron Burrows, Jack Huston, Pell James, Laura Ramsey, Dallas Roberts, Robert Loggia, Gore Vidal, Jesse Plemons, Sierra Aylina McClain, Mei Melancon, Braxton Pope, Clayton Rohner, Joel Gretsch, Aimee Garcia, Mystro Clark, Brian Palermo, Ashley Greene, Brian Huskey, Jillian Armenante, Joe Nieves, Ike Barinholtz, Robin Williams	
J U L Y	24	The Ugly Truth	Columbia Pictures / Relativity Media / Lakeshore Entertainment	Robert Luketic (director); Nicole Eastman, Karen McCullah Lutz, Kirsten Smith (screenplay); Katherine Heigl, Gerard Butler, Eric Winter, Nick Searcy, Cheryl Hines, John Michael Higgins, Bree Turner, Kevin Connolly, Bonnie Somerville, Yvette Nicole Brown, Allen Maldonado, Craig Ferguson, Jesse D. Goins, Nate Corddry, Steve Little, Arielle Vandenberg, Rocco DiSpirito, Valente Rodriguez, Tom Virtue, Adam John Harrington, Mimi Michaels, Vicki Lewis, Noah Matthews, John Sloman, Dan Callahan, Tess Parker	
J U L Y	29	Adam	Fox Searchlight Pictures	Max Mayer (director/screenplay); Hugh Dancy, Rose Byrne, Peter Gallagher, Amy Irving, Frankie Faison, Mark Linn-Baker, Haviland Morris, Adam LeFevre, Mark Margolis, Mike Hodge, John Rothman, Steffany Huckaby, Maddie Corman, Jeff Hiller, Karina Arroyave	
J U L Y	31	Aliens in the Attic	20th Century Fox / Regency Enterprises	John Schultz (director); Mark Burton, Adam F. Goldberg (screenplay); Carter Jenkins, Austin Butler, Ashley Tisdale, Ashley Boettcher, Robert Hoffman, Kevin Nealon, Gillian Vigman, Andy Richter, Doris Roberts, Tim Meadows, Malese Jow, Thomas Haden Church, Josh Peck, J.K. Simmons, Kari Wahlgren, Ashley Peldon	
J U L Y	31	The Collector	Freestyle Releasing	Marcus Dunstan (director/screenplay); Patrick Melton (screenplay); Josh Stewart, Michael Reilly Burke, Andrea Roth, Juan Fernández de Alarcon, Karley Scott Collins, Daniella Alonso, Haley Pullos, Diane Ayala Goldner, Madeline Zima, Robert Ray Wisdom	
J U L Y	31	The Cove	Roadside Attractions	Louie Psihoyos (director); Mark Monroe (screenplay); Ric O'Barry, Hayden Panettiere, Scott Baker, Isabel Lucas, Hardy Jones, Joe Chisholm, Mandy-Rae Cruickshank, Hannah Fraser, Charles Hambleton, Simon Hutchins, Kirk Krack, Roger Payne, John Potter, Louie Psihoyos, Dave Rastovich, Paul Watson	
J U L Y	31	Funny People	Universal Pictures / Columbia Pictures / Relativity Media	Judd Apatow (director/screenplay); Adam Sandler, Seth Rogen, Leslie Mann, Eric Bana, Jonah Hill, Jason Schwartzman, Aubrey Plaza, Maude Apatow, RZA, Aziz Ansari, Justin Long, Andy Dick, Charles Fleischer, Paul Reiser, Maggie Siff, Eminem, Ray Romano, Janeane Garofalo, Ben Stiller, Sarah Silverman, James Taylor, Norm Macdonald, Nicole Parker, George Wallace, Kim Taylor, Jimmy Johnson, Jon Brion, Torsten Voges, Rod Man, Wayne Federman, George Coe, Budd Friedman, Carol Leifer, Iris Apatow	
A U G U S T	31				
A U G U S T	7	Cold Souls	Journeyman Pictures	Sophie Barthes (director/screenplay); Paul Giamatti, Emily Watson, Dina Korzun, David Strathairn, Katheryn Winnick, Lauren Ambrose, Boris Kievsky	
A U G U S T	7	G.I. Joe: The Rise of Cobra	Paramount Pictures / Spyglass Entertainment / Hasbro Studios	Stephen Sommers (director); Stuart Beattie, David Elliot, Paul Lovett (screenplay); Channing Tatum, Christopher Eccleston, Sienna Miller, Dennis Quaid, Rachel Nichols, Ray Park, Marlon Wayans, Arnold Vosloo, Joseph Gordon-Levitt, Adewale Akinnuoye-Agbaje, Saïd Taghmaoui, Jonathan Pryce, Byung-hun Lee, Kevin J. O'Connor, Hélène Cardona, Brendan Fraser, Gregory Fitoussi, Karolína Kurková, Gerald Okamura, Leo Howard, Brandon Soo Hoo, Michael Benyaer, Jacques Frantz, Gunner Wright, Charles Howerton	
A U G U S T	7	I Sell the Dead	IFC Films	Glenn McQuaid (director/screenplay); Dominic Monaghan, Larry Fessenden, Angus Scrimm, Ron Perlman, Brenda Cooney, John Speredakos, Daniel Manche, Eileen Colgan, James Godwin, Joel Garland, Aidan Redmond	
A U G U S T	7	Julie & Julia	Columbia Pictures	Nora Ephron (director/screenplay); Meryl Streep, Amy Adams, Stanley Tucci, Chris Messina, Linda Emond, Jane Lynch, Vanessa Ferlito, Frances Sternhagen, Dan Aykroyd, Mary Lynn Rajskub, Joan Juliet Buck, George Bartenieff, Casey Wilson, Jillian Bach, Remak Ramsay, Brooks Ashmanskas, Eric Sheffer Stevens, Deborah Rush, Amanda Hesser, Stephen Bogardus, Kelly AuCoin, Richard Bekins, Marceline Hugot, Erin Dilly, Simon Feil, Françoise Lebrun, Mary Kay Place, Lindsay Felton	
A U G U S T	7	Paper Heart	Overture Films	Nicholas Jasenovec (director/screenplay); Charlyne Yi (screenplay); Charlyne Yi, Michael Cera, Jake Johnson, Seth Rogen, Demetri Martin, Martin Starr, Derek Waters, Paul Rust, Paul Scheer	
A U G U S T	7	A Perfect Getaway	Rogue Pictures / Relativity Media	David Twohy (director/screenplay); Timothy Olyphant, Milla Jovovich, Kiele Sanchez, Steve Zahn, Marley Shelton, Chris Hemsworth, Anthony Ruivivar, Dale Dickey, Peter "Navy" Tuiasosopo, Holt McCallany, Tory Kittles, Travis Willingham	
A U G U S T	14	Bandslam	Summit Entertainment / Walden Media	Todd Graff (director); Dan Berendsen (screenplay); Gaelan Connell, Alyson Michalka, Vanessa Hudgens, Lisa Kudrow, Scott Porter, Ryan Donowho, Charlie Saxton, Tim Jo, David Bowie, Lisa Chung, Elvy Yost	
A U G U S T	14	District 9	TriStar Pictures	Neill Blomkamp (director/screenplay); Terri Tatchell (screenplay); Sharlto Copley, Jason Cope, David James, Mandla Gaduka, William Allen Young, Eugene Wanangwa Khumbanyiwa, Kenneth Nkosi, Nathalie Boltt, Sylvaine Strike, John Sumner, Jed Brophy, Vittorio Leonardi, Nick Boraine, Trevor Coppola, Vanessa Haywood, Louis Minnaar, Nick Blake, Johan van Schoor, Marian Hooman, Jonathan Taylor, Stella Steenkamp, Tim Gordon, Robert Hobbs	
A U G U S T	14	Earth Days	Zeitgeist Films	Robert Stone (director)	
A U G U S T	14	The Goods: Live Hard, Sell Hard	Paramount Vantage / Gary Sanchez Productions	Neal Brennan (director); Andy Stock, Rick Stempson (screenplay); Jeremy Piven, Ving Rhames, James Brolin, David Koechner, Kathryn Hahn, Ed Helms, Jordana Spiro, Craig Robinson, Tony Hale, Ken Jeong, Rob Riggle, Alan Thicke, Charles Napier, Jonathan Sadowski, Noureen DeWulf, Wendie Malick, Bryan Callen, Joey Kern, Matt Walsh, Ian Roberts, Kristen Schaal, Christopher Gartin, Jessica St. Clair, Morgan Murphy, Gwen Stewart, T.J. Miller, Molly Erdman, Paul Lieberstein, Will Ferrell, Gina Gershon, Bradley Steven Perry, Kulap Vilaysack	
A U G U S T	14	Grace	Anchor Bay Entertainment	Paul Solet (director); Jordan Ladd, Gabrielle Rose, Stephen Park	
A U G U S T	14	It Might Get Loud	Sony Pictures Classics	Davis Guggenheim (director); Jack White, Jimmy Page, The Edge	
A U G U S T	14	Ponyo	Walt Disney Pictures / Studio Ghibli	Hayao Miyazaki (director); Noah Cyrus, Frankie Jonas, Tina Fey, Matt Damon, Liam Neeson, Cate Blanchett, Lily Tomlin, Cloris Leachman, Betty White, Jennessa Rose, Kurt Knutsson, Akiko Yano	
A U G U S T	14	Spread	Anchor Bay Entertainment	David MacKenzie (director); Ashton Kutcher, Anne Heche	
A U G U S T	14	The Time Traveler's Wife	New Line Cinema	Robert Schwentke (director); Bruce Joel Rubin (screenplay); Eric Bana, Rachel McAdams, Arliss Howard, Ron Livingston, Stephen Tobolowsky, Michelle Nolden, Hailey McCann, Brooklynn Proulx, Alex Ferris, Fiona Reid, Philip J. Craig, Broken Social Scene, Michael Bell, Anne Lockhart, Mona Marshall, Scott Menville, Paul Pape	
A U G U S T	21	Art & Copy	Seventh Art Releasing	Doug Pray (director); Mary Wells, Dan Wieden, Hal Riney	
A U G U S T	21	Inglourious Basterds	The Weinstein Company / Universal Pictures	Quentin Tarantino (director/screenplay); Brad Pitt, Mélanie Laurent, Christoph Waltz, Eli Roth, Michael Fassbender, Diane Kruger, Daniel Brühl, Til Schweiger, Gedeon Burkhard, Jacky Ido, B.J. Novak, Omar Doom, Samm Levine, August Diehl, Denis Ménochet, Sylvester Groth, Martin Wuttke, Mike Myers, Julie Dreyfus, Richard Sammel, Alexander Fehling, Rod Taylor, Sönke Möhring, Paul Rust, Michael Bacall, Ken Duken, Christian Berkel, Léa Seydoux, Jana Pallaske, Rainer Bock, Buddy Joe Hooker, Christian Brückner, Eva Löbau, Bo Svenson, Enzo G. Castellari, Samuel L. Jackson, Harvey Keitel, Béla B., Quentin Tarantino	
A U G U S T	21	The Marc Pease Experience	Paramount Vantage	Todd Louiso (director); Jason Schwartzman, Ben Stiller, Anna Kendrick, Ebon Moss-Bachrach	
A U G U S T	21	My One and Only	Freestyle Releasing	Richard Loncraine (director); Charlie Peters (screenplay); Cast: Renée Zellweger, Kevin Bacon, Chris Noth, Logan Lerman, Troy Garity	
A U G U S T	21	Post Grad	20th Century Fox / The Montecito Picture Company	Vicky Jenson (director); Kelly Fremon (screenplay); Alexis Bledel, Zach Gilford, Michael Keaton, Jane Lynch, Bobby Coleman, Carol Burnett, Rodrigo Santoro, Catherine Reitman, Mary Anne McGarry, J.K. Simmons, Vanessa Branch, Craig Robinson, Fred Armisen, Alexandra Holden, Andrew Daly, Desean Terry, Walter Jones, Demetri Martin	
A U G U S T	21	Shorts: The Adventures of the Wishing Rock	Warner Bros. Pictures / Imagenation Abu Dhabi / Media Rights Capital / Troublemaker Studios	Robert Rodriguez (director/screenplay); Jon Cryer, William H. Macy, James Spader, Jimmy Bennett, Kat Dennings, Jake Short, Leo Howard, Devon Gearhart, Alejandro Rose-Garcia, Elizabeth Avellan, Jolie Vanier, Trevor Gagnon, Rebel Rodriguez, Bianca Rodriguez	
A U G U S T	21	World's Greatest Dad	Magnolia Pictures	Bobcat Goldthwait (director/screenplay); Robin Williams, Daryl Sabara, Alexie Gilmore, Evan Martin, Geoff Pierson, Henry Simmons, Mitzi McCall, Jermaine Williams, Lorraine Nicholson, Morgan Murphy, Toby Huss, Tom Kenny, Jill Talley, Bruce Hornsby, Krist Novoselic, Bobcat Goldthwait	
A U G U S T	21	X Games: The Movie	ESPN Films	Steve Lawrence (director); Shaun White, Travis Pastrana, Ricky Carmichael, Danny Way, Bob Burnquist	
A U G U S T	28	Big Fan	First Independent Pictures	Robert D. Siegel (director); Patton Oswalt, Kevin Corrigan	
A U G U S T	28	The Final Destination	New Line Cinema	David R. Ellis (director); Eric Bress (screenplay); Bobby Campo, Nick Zano, Krista Allen, Shantel VanSanten, Haley Webb, Mykelti Williamson, Andrew Fiscella, Justin Welborn, Stephanie Honoré, Lara Grice, Tina Parker	
A U G U S T	28	Halloween II	Dimension Films	Rob Zombie (director/screenplay); Tyler Mane, Malcolm McDowell, Scout Taylor-Compton, Danielle Harris, Brad Dourif, Margot Kidder, Sheri Moon Zombie, Brea Grant, Howard Hesseman, Angela Trimbur, Mary Birdsong, Daniel Roebuck, Bill Fagerbakke, Richard Brake, Dayton Callie, Richard Riehle, Mark Christopher Lawrence, Mark Boone Junior, Octavia Spencer, Silas Weir Mitchell, Chris Hardwick, Betsy Rue, "Weird Al" Yankovic, Caroline Williams, Diane Ayala Goldner, Duane Whitaker, Nicky Whelan, Jeff Daniel Phillips, Sylvia Jefferies, Robert Curtis Brown, Greg Travis, Matt Lintz, Matt Bush, Renae Geerlings, Sean Whalen, Meagen Fay, Justin Welborn, Eileen Dietz, Sean Marquette	
A U G U S T	28	Mystery Team	Roadside Attractions	Dan Eckman (director); Donald Glover, DC Pierson, Dominic Dierkes, Aubrey Plaza, Bobby Moynihan, Matt Walsh	
A U G U S T	28	The Open Road	Anchor Bay Entertainment	Michael Meredith (director/screenplay); Jeff Bridges, Justin Timberlake, Kate Mara, Harry Dean Stanton, Lyle Lovett, Mary Steenburgen, Ted Danson, Billy Slaughter	
A U G U S T	28	The September Issue	Roadside Attractions	R.J. Cutler (director); Anna Wintour, Grace Coddington, John Galliano, Oscar de la Renta, Thakoon Panichgul, Stefano Pilati, Jean-Paul Gaultier, Nicolas Ghesquière, Jane Thompson, Isabel Toledo, Karl Lagerfeld, Vera Wang, Coco Rocha, Sienna Miller, Caroline Trentini, Chanel Iman, Daria Werbowy, Lily Donaldson, Raquel Zimmermann, Lily Cole, Hilary Rhoda, Patrick Demarchelier, Steven Klein, Craig McDean, Mario Testino, David Sims, Hamish Bowles, Edward Enninful, Si Newhouse, André Leon Talley, Robert Verdi	
A U G U S T	28	Taking Woodstock	Focus Features	Ang Lee (director); James Schamus (screenplay); Demetri Martin, Jonathan Groff, Paul Dano, Eugene Levy, Emile Hirsch, Liev Schreiber, Jeffrey Dean Morgan, Dan Fogler, Henry Goodman, Imelda Staunton, Kelli Garner, Adam Pally, Mamie Gummer, Skylar Astin, Adam LeFevre, Richard Thomas, Kevin Chamberlin, Katherine Waterston, Sondra James, Damian Kulash, Darren Pettie	
A U G U S T	28	We Live in Public		Ondi Timoner (director); Josh Harris	
S E P T E M B E R	4	All About Steve	20th Century Fox / Fox 2000 Pictures	Phil Traill (director); Kim Barker (screenplay); Sandra Bullock, Thomas Haden Church, Bradley Cooper, Ken Jeong, DJ Qualls, Katy Mixon, Howard Hesseman, M.C. Gainey, Luenell, Keith David, Jason Jones, Noah Munck, Jordan Morris, Holmes Osborne, Rachel Sterling	
S E P T E M B E R	4	American Casino	Argot Pictures	Leslie Cockburn (director); Leslie Cockburn, Andrew Cockburn (screenplay)	
S E P T E M B E R	4	Amreeka	Rotana Studios / Imagenation Abu Dhabi / National Geographic Cinema Ventures	Cherien Dabis (director); Nisreen Faour, Melkar Muallem	
S E P T E M B E R	4	Carriers	Paramount Pictures	Àlex Pastor, David Pastor (directors); Chris Pine, Lou Taylor Pucci, Piper Perabo, Emily VanCamp, Christopher Meloni	
S E P T E M B E R	4	Extract	Miramax Films	Mike Judge (director/screenplay); Ben Affleck, Jason Bateman, Clifton Collins Jr., Mila Kunis, Kristen Wiig, Dustin Milligan, Beth Grant, J.K. Simmons, David Koechner, T.J. Miller, Matt Schulze, Gene Simmons, Brent Briscoe, Hal Sparks, Nick Thune, Tom Virtue, Jenny O'Hara, Mike Judge, Javier Gutiérrez, Lidia Porto, Lamberto Gutierrez	
S E P T E M B E R	4	Gamer	Lionsgate / Lakeshore Entertainment	Mark Neveldine, Brian Taylor (directors/screenplay); Gerard Butler, Michael C. Hall, Amber Valletta, Alison Lohman, Kyra Sedgwick, Chris "Ludacris" Bridges, John Leguizamo, Milo Ventimiglia, Logan Lerman, Terry Crews, Aaron Yoo, Zoë Bell, Mimi Michaels, Ashley Rickards, Jonathan Chase, Keith David, Joseph D. Reitman, John de Lancie, Lloyd Kaufman, James Roday Rodriguez, Maggie Lawson, Ariana Scott, Jade Ramsey, Nikita Ramsey	
S E P T E M B E R	9	9	Focus Features / Relativity Media	Shane Acker (director); Pamela Pettler (screenplay); Elijah Wood, Christopher Plummer, Martin Landau, John C. Reilly, Crispin Glover, Jennifer Connelly, Fred Tatasciore, Alan Oppenheimer, Tom Kane, Helen Wilson	
S E P T E M B E R	9	Walt & El Grupo		Theodore Thomas (director)	
S E P T E M B E R	11	Beyond a Reasonable Doubt	Anchor Bay Entertainment	Peter Hyams (director/screenplay); Michael Douglas, Jesse Metcalfe, Amber Tamblyn, Joel David Moore, Orlando Jones	
S E P T E M B E R	11	Crude	First Run Features	Joe Berlinger (director)	
S E P T E M B E R	11	I Can Do Bad All by Myself	Lionsgate	Tyler Perry (director/screenplay); Taraji P. Henson, Adam Rodríguez, Brian White, Mary J. Blige, Gladys Knight, Marvin L. Winans, Tyler Perry, Kwesi Nii-Lante Boakye, Freddy Siglar, Hope Olaidé Wilson	
S E P T E M B E R	11	No Impact Man	Oscilloscope Laboratories	Laura Gabbert (director); Colin Beavan, Michelle Conlin	
S E P T E M B E R	11	Sorority Row	Summit Entertainment	Stewart Hendler (director); Josh Stolberg, Pete Goldfinger (screenplay); Briana Evigan, Leah Pipes, Rumer Willis, Jamie Chung, Audrina Patridge, Carrie Fisher, Julian Morris, Margo Harshman, Matt Lanter, Caroline D'Amore, Matt O'Leary, Maxx Hennard, Rick Applegate, Ken Bolden, Nicole Moore	
S E P T E M B E R	11	White on Rice	Variance Films	Dave Boyle (director); Hiroshi Watanabe, James Kyson Lee, Mio Takada, Lynn Chenn	
S E P T E M B E R	11	Whiteout	Warner Bros. Pictures / Dark Castle Entertainment	Dominic Sena (director); Jon Hoeber, Erich Hoeber, Chad Hayes, Carey Hayes (screenplay); Kate Beckinsale, Gabriel Macht, Columbus Short, Alex O'Loughlin, Tom Skerritt, Shawn Doyle, Arthur Holden, Bashar Rahal, Patrick Sabongui, Jesse Todd, Joel Keller, Erin Hicock, Steve Lucescu, Marc James Beauchamp	
S E P T E M B E R	18	The Burning Plain	Magnolia Pictures	Guillermo Arriaga (director/screenplay); Charlize Theron, Kim Basinger, Jennifer Lawrence, Joaquim de Almeida, John Corbett, Robin Tunney, Brett Cullen, Danny Pino, José María Yazpik, Tessa Ía, Rachel Ticotin, J.D. Pardo, Diego J. Torres, Rafael Hernández, Jeffrey Donovan	
S E P T E M B E R	18	Cloudy with a Chance of Meatballs	Columbia Pictures / Sony Pictures Animation	Phil Lord, Chris Miller (directors/screenplay); Bill Hader, Anna Faris, James Caan, Andy Samberg, Bruce Campbell, Mr. T, Bobb'e J. Thompson, Benjamin Bratt, Neil Patrick Harris, Al Roker, Lauren Graham, Will Forte, Max Neuwirth, Angela Shelton, Neil Flynn, Liz Cackowski, Isabella Acres, Lori Alan, Shane Baumel, Bob Bergen, Cody Cameron, Marsha Clark, John Cygan, Paul Eiding, Jess Harnell, Phil Lord, Sherry Lynn, Danny Mann, Mona Marshall, Mickie McGowan, Chris Miller, Laraine Newman, Jan Rabson, Grace Rolek, Jeremy Shada, Ariel Winter	
S E P T E M B E R	18	Fuel	Intention Media	John Tickell (director); Josh Tickell, Richard Branson, Sheryl Crow, Larry David, Larry Hagman, Woody Harrelson, Van Jones, Robert Kennedy Jr., Neil Young	
S E P T E M B E R	18	The Informant!	Warner Bros. Pictures / Participant Media / Groundswell Productions	Steven Soderbergh (director); Scott Z. Burns (screenplay); Matt Damon, Scott Bakula, Joel McHale, Melanie Lynskey, Thomas F. Wilson, Joel McHale, Jimmy Pardo, Paul F. Tompkins, Clancy Brown, Ann Cusack, Ann Dowd, Tom Papa, Rick Overton, Allan Havey, Patton Oswalt, Craig Ricci Shaynak, Scott Adsit, Eddie Jemison, Arden Myrin, Tony Hale, Andrew Daly, Frank Welker, Candy Clark, Dick Smothers, Tom Smothers, Richard Horvitz, Bob Zany, Lucas McHugh Carroll	
S E P T E M B E R	18	Jennifer's Body	20th Century Fox	Karyn Kusama (director); Diablo Cody (screenplay); Megan Fox, Amanda Seyfried, Johnny Simmons, Adam Brody, J.K. Simmons, Amy Sedaris, Kyle Gallner, Cynthia Stevenson, Chris Pratt, Valerie Tian, Bill Fagerbakke, Lance Henriksen	
S E P T E M B E R	18	Love Happens	Universal Pictures / Relativity Media	Brandon Camp (director/screenplay); Mike Thompson (screenplay); Jennifer Aniston, Aaron Eckhart, Dan Fogler, Judy Greer, Martin Sheen, Joe Anderson, John Carroll Lynch, Frances Conroy, Darla Vandenbossche, Panou	
S E P T E M B E R	18	The Secrets of Jonathan Sperry	Five & Two Pictures	Rich Christiano (director); Gavin MacLeod, Jansen Panettiere, Frankie Ryan Manriquez, Robert Guillaume	
S E P T E M B E R	19	Blind Date	Variance Films	Stanley Tucci (director); Stanley Tucci, Patricia Clarkson	
S E P T E M B E R	19	Pretty Ugly People	Gravitas Ventures	Tate Taylor (director); Missi Pyle, Melissa McCarthy, Larry Sulivan, Phill Lewis, Josh Hopkins, Jack Noseworthy, Octavia Spencer, Philip Littell, William Sanderson, Allison Janney	
S E P T E M B E R	22	Scooby-Doo! The Mystery Begins	Warner Premiere / Cartoon Network	Brian Levant (director); Daniel Altiere, Steven Altiere (screenplay); Robbie Amell, Kate Melton, Hayley Kiyoko, Nick Palatas, Frank Welker, Garry Chalk, C. Ernst Harth, Lorena Gale, Daniel Riordan, Shawn Macdonald, Leah James, Brian Sutton	
S E P T E M B E R	25	The Boys Are Back	Miramax Films	Scott Hicks (director); Allan Cubitt (screenplay); Clive Owen, Laura Fraser, Emma Lung, Nicholas McAnulty, George MacKay, Julia Blake, Emma Booth, Erik Thomson, Natasha Little, Tommy Bastow, Luke O'Loughlin	
S E P T E M B E R	25	Brief Interviews with Hideous Men	IFC Films	John Krasinski (director/screenplay); Julianne Nicholson, Ben Shenkman, Timothy Hutton, Chris Messina, Max Minghella, Lou Taylor Pucci, Will Arnett, John Krasinski, Rashida Jones, Glenn Fitzgerald, Dominic Cooper, Bobby Cannavale, Corey Stoll, Christopher Meloni, Denis O'Hare, Josh Charles, Michael Cerveris, Will Forte, Joey Slotnick, Lucy Gordon, Ben Gibbard, Frankie Faison	
S E P T E M B E R	25	Fame	Metro-Goldwyn-Mayer / Lakeshore Entertainment / United Artists	Kevin Tancharoen (director); Allison Burnett (screenplay); Paul McGill, Debbie Allen, Megan Mullally, Kelsey Grammer, Bebe Neuwirth, Charles S. Dutton, Asher Book, Kristy Flores, Paul Iacono, Naturi Naughton, Kay Panabaker, Kherington Payne, Collins Pennie, Walter Perez, Anna Maria Perez de Tagle, Cody Longo, Dale Godboldo, Michael Hyatt, James Read, Laura Johnson, Howard Gutman, Marcus Hopson, Johanna Braddy, Julius Tennon, April Grace, Ryan Surratt	
S E P T E M B E R	25	I Hope They Serve Beer in Hell	Freestyle Releasing	Bob Gosse (director); Tucker Max, Nils Parker (screenplay); Matt Czuchry, Jesse Bradford, Geoff Stults, Keri Lynn Pratt, Marika Domińczyk, Nicole Muirbrook, Traci Lords, Paul Wall, Derek Wayne Johnson, Melissa Fumero, Forrest Griffin, Mac Danzig, Drew Curtis, Timothy Ferriss, Tucker Max, Bill Dawes, Nils Parker	
S E P T E M B E R	25	The Other Man	Image Entertainment	Richard Eyre (director/screenplay); Charles Wood (screenplay); Liam Neeson, Antonio Banderas, Laura Linney, Romola Garai, Pam Ferris, Paterson Joseph, Craig Parkinson, Richard Graham, Emma Fielding, Amanda Drew, Paul Ritter, Joseph Long	
S E P T E M B E R	25	Paranormal Activity	Paramount Pictures	Oren Peli (director/screenplay); Katie Featherston, Micah Sloat, Ashley Palmer, Mark Fredrichs, Amber Armstrong	
S E P T E M B E R	25	Surrogates	Touchstone Pictures / Mandeville Films	Jonathan Mostow (director); John Brancato, Michael Ferris (screenplay); Bruce Willis, Radha Mitchell, Rosamund Pike, Ving Rhames, James Cromwell, Jack Noseworthy, Boris Kodjoe, James Francis Ginty, Michael Cudlitz, Devin Ratray, Helena Mattsson, Cody Christian, Trevor Donovan, Shane Dzicek	

== October–December ==
Opening		Title	Production company	Cast and crew	Ref.
O C T O B E R	2	Capitalism: A Love Story	The Weinstein Company	Michael Moore (director)	
O C T O B E R	2	The Invention of Lying	Warner Bros. Pictures / Media Rights Capital	Ricky Gervais, Matthew Robinson (directors/screenplay); Ricky Gervais, Jennifer Garner, Rob Lowe, Jonah Hill, Louis C.K., John Hodgman, Tina Fey, Christopher Guest, Jeffrey Tambor, Nate Corddry, Jason Bateman, Philip Seymour Hoffman, Stephen Merchant, Fionnula Flanagan, Roz Ryan, Jimmi Simpson, Shaun Williamson, Bobby Moynihan, Dreama Walker, Ashlie Atkinson, Donald Foley, Martin Starr, Ruben Santiago-Hudson, Stephanie March, Matthew Robinson, Edward Norton, Karl Pilkington, Eric André	
O C T O B E R	2	A Serious Man	Focus Features / StudioCanal / Relativity Media / Working Title Films / Mike Zoss Productions	Joel Coen, Ethan Coen (directors/screenplay); Michael Stuhlbarg, Richard Kind, Fred Melamed, Sari Lennick, Adam Arkin, Simon Helberg, Fyvush Finkel, Michael Lerner, George Wyner, Steve Park, Alan Mandell, Amy Landecker, Raye Birk, Ari Hoptman, Aaron Wolf, Jessica McManus, Peter Breitmayer, Brent Braunschweig, Katherine Borowitz, Allen Lewis Rickman, Yelena Shmulenson, David Kang	
O C T O B E R	2	Toy Story & Toy Story 2 in 3-D (re-released in 3-D)	Walt Disney Pictures / Pixar Animation Studios	John Lasseter (director); Joel Cohen, Alec Sokolow, Andrew Stanton, Joss Whedon, Rita Hsiao, Doug Chamberlin, Chris Webb (screenplay); Tom Hanks, Tim Allen, Joan Cusack, Kelsey Grammer, Don Rickles, Jim Varney, Wallace Shawn, John Ratzenberger, Annie Potts, Estelle Harris, Wayne Knight, John Morris, Erik von Detten, Laurie Metcalf, R. Lee Ermey, Jodi Benson, Jonathan Harris, Sarah Freeman, Penn Jillette, Jack Angel, Greg Berg, Debi Derryberry, Bill Farmer, Sherry Lynn, Scott McAfee, Mickie McGowan, Ryan O'Donohue, Jeff Pidgeon, Patrick Pinney, Phil Proctor, Jan Rabson, Joe Ranft, Andrew Stanton, Shane Sweet, Bob Bergen, Rodger Bumpass, Jennifer Darling, Paul Eiding, Holly Gauthier-Frankel, Arthur Holden, John Lasseter, Clarence Nash, Kath Soucie, Sheb Wooley, Mary Kay Bergman, Corey Burton, Pat Fraley, Jess Harnell, Andi Peters, Carly Schroeder, Madylin Sweeten, Lee Unkrich, Tress MacNeille	
O C T O B E R	2	Whip It	Fox Searchlight Pictures	Drew Barrymore (director); Shauna Cross (screenplay); Elliot Page, Marcia Gay Harden, Juliette Lewis, Kristen Wiig, Zoë Bell, Drew Barrymore, Jimmy Fallon, Daniel Stern, Alia Shawkat, Carlo Alban, Landon Pigg, Eve, Andrew Wilson, Ari Graynor, Har Mar Superstar	
O C T O B E R	2	Zombieland	Columbia Pictures / Relativity Media	Ruben Fleischer (director); Rhett Reese, Paul Wernick (screenplay); Woody Harrelson, Jesse Eisenberg, Emma Stone, Abigail Breslin, Amber Heard, Bill Murray	
O C T O B E R	6	Assassination of a High School President	Yari Film Group	Brett Simon (director); Tim Calpin, Kevin Jakubowski (screenplay); Reece Thompson, Bruce Willis, Mischa Barton, Michael Rapaport, Kathryn Morris, Emily Meade, Josh Pais	
O C T O B E R	9	Couples Retreat	Universal Pictures / Relativity Media	Peter Billingsley (director); Jon Favreau, Vince Vaughn, Dana Fox (screenplay); Vince Vaughn, Jason Bateman, Jon Favreau, Faizon Love, Kristin Davis, Malin Åkerman, Kristen Bell, Kali Hawk, Jean Reno, Peter Serafinowicz, Tasha Smith, Ken Jeong, Amy Hill, John Michael Higgins, Carlos Ponce, Temuera Morrison, Karen David, Jonna Walsh, Vernon Vaughn	
O C T O B E R	9	An Education	Sony Pictures Classics	Lone Scherfig (director); Nick Hornby (screenplay); Carey Mulligan, Peter Sarsgaard, Rosamund Pike, Dominic Cooper, Alfred Molina, Cara Seymour, Emma Thompson, Olivia Williams, Sally Hawkins, Matthew Beard, James Norton, Ellie Kendrick, Ashley Rice	
O C T O B E R	9	Free Style	Samuel Goldwyn Films	William Dear (director); Corbin Bleu, Sandra Echeverría, Matt Bellefleur, Jesse Moss, Ann Miller, Madison Pettis	
O C T O B E R	9	From Mexico with Love	Roadside Attractions	Jimmy Nickerson (director); Kuno Becker, Steven Bauer, Danay Garcia, Bruce McGill, Stephen Lang	
O C T O B E R	9	Good Hair	Roadside Attractions	Jeff Stilson (director); Chris Rock	
O C T O B E R	9	Peter and Vandy	Strand Releasing	Jay DiPietro (director/screenplay); Jason Ritter, Jess Weixler	
O C T O B E R	9	Trucker	Monterey Media	James Mottern (director/screenplay); Michelle Monaghan, Nathan Fillion, Jimmy Bennett, Joey Lauren Adams, Benjamin Bratt	
O C T O B E R	10	Virginia Creepers	Horse Archer Productions	Sean Kotz, Christopher Valluzzo (director/screenplay); Mr. Lobo, Dick Dyszel, John Dimes	
O C T O B E R	16	Black Dynamite	Apparition	Scott Sanders (director/screenplay); Michael Jai White, Byron Minns (screenplay); Michael Jai White, Salli Richardson, Arsenio Hall, Kevin Chapman, Tommy Davidson, Obba Babatundé, Richard Edson, Buddy Lewis, Brian McKnight, Nicole Ari Parker, Phil Morris, Miguel A. Núñez Jr., Tucker Smallwood, John Salley, Chris Spencer, Mike Starr, Nicole Sullivan, Kym Whitley, Mykelti Williamson, Bokeem Woodbine, Cedric Yarbrough, Roger Yuan, William Bassett, Baron Vaughn, Charmane Star, Byron Minns, James McManus, John Kerry, Phyllis Applegate, Cheryl Carter, Pete Antico, Stacy Adams	
O C T O B E R	16	Janky Promoters	Third Rail	Marcus Raboy (director); Ice Cube, Mike Epps, Young Jeezy	
O C T O B E R	16	Law Abiding Citizen	Overture Films	F. Gary Gray (director); Kurt Wimmer (screenplay); Gerard Butler, Jamie Foxx, Michael Gambon, Viola Davis, Leslie Bibb, Regina Hall, Colm Meaney, Bruce McGill, Michael Kelly, Michael Irby, Roger Hart, Christian Stolte, Gregory Itzin, Annie Corley, Richard Portnow, Josh Stewart, Emerald-Angel Young	
O C T O B E R	16	The Ministers	Maya Entertainment	Franc. Reyes (director); John Leguizamo, Florencia Lozano, Wanda De Jesus, Saul Stein, Manny Pérez, Diane Venora, Harvey Keitel	
O C T O B E R	16	New York, I Love You	Vivendi Entertainment	Fatih Akin, Yvan Attal, Randall Balsmeyer, Allen Hughes, Shunji Iwai, Jiang Wen, Shekhar Kapur, Joshua Marston, Mira Nair, Natalie Portman, Brett Ratner (directors); Hu Hong, Meng Yao, Suketu Mehta, Israel Horovitz, Olivier, Jeff Nathanson, Xan Cassavetes, Stephen Winter, Anthony Minghella, Natalie Portman, Fatih Akin, Joshua Marston, Hall Powell, James Strouse (screenplay); Bradley Cooper, Hayden Christensen, Andy García, Rachel Bilson, Natalie Portman, Irrfan Khan, Emilie Ohana, Orlando Bloom, Christina Ricci, Maggie Q, Ethan Hawke, Anton Yelchin, James Caan, Olivia Thirlby, Drea de Matteo, Julie Christie, John Hurt, Shia LaBeouf, Uğur Yücel, Taylor Geare, Carlos Acosta, Shu Qi, Chris Cooper, Robin Wright Penn, Eli Wallach, Cloris Leachman, Blake Lively, Jacinda Barrett, Burt Young, Eva Amurri, Justin Bartha	
O C T O B E R	16	The Stepfather	Screen Gems	Nelson B. McCormick (director); J. S. Cardone (screenplay); Penn Badgley, Dylan Walsh, Amber Heard, Sela Ward, Jon Tenney, Sherry Stringfield, Paige Turco, Nancy Linehan Charles, Braeden Lemasters, Deirdre Lovejoy, Skyler Samuels, Jessalyn Gilsig, Marcuis Harris	
O C T O B E R	16	Where the Wild Things Are	Warner Bros. Pictures / Legendary Pictures / Village Roadshow Pictures / Playtone	Spike Jonze (director/screenplay); Dave Eggers (screenplay); Max Records, Paul Dano, Forest Whitaker, Catherine Keener, James Gandolfini, Catherine O'Hara, Mark Ruffalo, Lauren Ambrose, Chris Cooper, Michael Berry Jr., Spike Jonze, Pepita Emmerichs, Steve Mouzakis, Angus Sampson	
O C T O B E R	23	Adventures of Power	Variance Films / Phase 4 Films	Ari Gold (director); Ari Gold, Michael McKean, Jane Lynch, Shoshannah Stern, Chiu Chi Ling, Adrian Grenier, Annie Golden	
O C T O B E R	23	Amelia	Fox Searchlight Pictures / Avalon Pictures	Mira Nair (director); Ronald Bass, Anna Hamilton Phelan (screenplay); Hilary Swank, Richard Gere, Ewan McGregor, Christopher Eccleston, Joe Anderson, Mia Wasikowska, William Cuddy, Cherry Jones, Divine Brown, Ron Smerczak	
O C T O B E R	23	Astro Boy	Summit Entertainment / Imagi Animation Studios	David Bowers (director/screenplay); Timothy Hyde Harris (screenplay); Freddie Highmore, Nicolas Cage, Nathan Lane, Bill Nighy, Eugene Levy, Matt Lucas, Donald Sutherland, Kristen Bell, Samuel L. Jackson, Charlize Theron, Alan Tudyk, David Alan Grier, Ryan Stiles, Madeline Carroll, Sterling Beaumon, Moisés Arias, Elle Fanning, Ryan Ochoa, Dee Bradley Baker, David Bowers	
O C T O B E R	23	Cirque du Freak: The Vampire's Assistant	Universal Pictures / Relativity Media	Paul Weitz (director/screenplay); Brian Helgeland (screenplay); John C. Reilly, Ken Watanabe, Chris Massoglia, Josh Hutcherson, Patrick Fugit, Ray Stevenson, Michael Cerveris, Frankie Faison, Jane Krakowski, Orlando Jones, Kristen Schaal, Salma Hayek, Willem Dafoe, Jessica Carlson, Morgan Saylor, Don McManus, Colleen Camp, Patrick Breen, Blake Nelson Boyd, Tom Woodruff Jr., Jonathan Nosan	
O C T O B E R	23	The Marine 2	WWE Films	Roel Reiné (director); Ted DiBiase Jr., Temuera Morrison, Lara Cox, Robert Coleby, Michael Rooker	
O C T O B E R	23	Motherhood	Freestyle Releasing	Katherine Dieckmann (director); Uma Thurman, Minnie Driver, Anthony Edwards	
O C T O B E R	23	Saw VI	Lionsgate / Twisted Pictures	Kevin Greutert (director); Marcus Dunstan, Patrick Melton (screenplay); Tobin Bell, Costas Mandylor, Betsy Russell, Mark Rolston, Peter Outerbridge, Shawnee Smith, Tanedra Howard, Athena Karkanis, Gerry Mendicino, Caroline Cave, George Newbern, Shauna MacDonald, Devon Bostick, Darius McCrary, Melanie Scrofano, Karen Cliche, François Sagat, Mpho Koaho, Angus Macfadyen, Bahar Soomekh, Joris Jarsky, Niamh Wilson, Samantha Lemole, Marty Moreau, Shawn Ahmed, Janelle Hutchison, Shawn Mathieson, James Gilbert, Larissa Gomes, Billy Otis, James Van Patten, Ginger Busch, Jeff Denlon, Lynn Denlon, Seth Baxter	
O C T O B E R	23	(Untitled)	Samuel Goldwyn Films	Jonathan Parker (director); Adam Goldberg, Marley Shelton, Eion Bailey, Lucy Punch, Vinnie Jones, Zak Orth	
O C T O B E R	23	The Yes Men Fix the World	HBO Films	Andy Bichlbaum, Mike Bonanno, Kurt Engfehr (director); Andy Bichlbaum, Mike Bonanno, Reggie Watts	
O C T O B E R	24	Halloweenight	Polonia Bros. Entertainment	Mark Polonia (director); Cindy Wheeler, Todd Carpenter, Ken Van Sant, Brian Berry, Bob Dennis, Dave Fife, Matt Satterly, S.A. Diasparra	
O C T O B E R	24	Night of the Demons	Seven Arts Pictures	Adam Gierasch (director); Shannon Elizabeth, Monica Keena, Diora Baird, Michael Copon, Bobbi Sue Luther, John F. Beach, Edward Furlong	
O C T O B E R	27	Tinker Bell and the Lost Treasure	Walt Disney Pictures / DisneyToon Studios / Walt Disney Studios Home Entertainment	Klay Hall (director); Evan Spiliotopoulos (screenplay); Mae Whitman, Jesse McCartney, Raven-Symoné, Lucy Liu, Kristin Chenoweth, Jane Horrocks, Anjelica Huston, Rob Paulsen, Jeff Bennett, Grey DeLisle, John DiMaggio, Bob Bergen, Roger Craig Smith, Thom Adcox-Hernandez, Angela Bartys, Eliza Pollock Zebert, Allison Roth	
O C T O B E R	28	Michael Jackson's This Is It	Columbia Pictures	Kenny Ortega (director); Michael Jackson	
O C T O B E R	30	The Boondock Saints II: All Saints Day	Stage 6 Films	Troy Duffy (director/screenplay); Sean Patrick Flanery, Norman Reedus, Clifton Collins Jr., Julie Benz, Billy Connolly, Peter Fonda, Willem Dafoe, Judd Nelson, Bob Marley, David Ferry, Daniel DeSanto, David Della Rocco, Paul Johansson, Gerard Parkes, Robb Wells	
O C T O B E R	30	Gentlemen Broncos	Fox Searchlight Pictures	Jared Hess (director/screenplay); Jerusha Huss (screenplay); Michael Angarano, Sam Rockwell, Jemaine Clement, Jennifer Coolidge, Halley Feiffer, Héctor Jiménez, Josh Pais, Mike White, Suzanne May, Edgar Oliver, Clive Revill	
O C T O B E R	30	The House of the Devil	MPI Media Group	Ti West (director); Jocelin Donahue, Tom Noonan, Mary Woronov, Greta Gerwig, Dee Wallace	
N O V E M B E R	6	The Box	Warner Bros. Pictures / Media Rights Capital	Richard Kelly (director/screenplay); Cameron Diaz, James Marsden, Frank Langella, James Rebhorn, Gillian Jacobs, Celia Weston, Deborah Rush, Lisa K. Wyatt, Kevin Robertson, Ian Kahn, John Magaro, Holmes Osborne, Sam Oz Stone, Mark Cartier, Michele Durrett, Ryan Woodle	
N O V E M B E R	6	A Christmas Carol	Walt Disney Pictures / ImageMovers Digital	Robert Zemeckis (director/screenplay); Jim Carrey, Gary Oldman, Bob Hoskins, Robin Wright Penn, Cary Elwes, Colin Firth, Lesley Manville, Fionnula Flanagan, Steve Valentine, Daryl Sabara, Sammi Hanratty, Julian Holloway, Molly C. Quinn, Fay Masterson, Paul Blackthorne	
N O V E M B E R	6	The Flying Scissors	Dinosaur Distribution	Jonah Tulis (director)	
N O V E M B E R	6	The Fourth Kind	Universal Pictures / Gold Circle Films	Olatunde Osunsanmi (director/screenplay); Milla Jovovich, Elias Koteas, Hakeem Kae-Kazim, Will Patton, Corey Johnson, Enzo Cilenti, Charlotte Milchard, Olatunde Osunsanmi	
N O V E M B E R	6	The Men Who Stare at Goats	Overture Films	Grant Heslov (director); Peter Straughan (screenplay); George Clooney, Jeff Bridges, Ewan McGregor, Kevin Spacey, Robert Patrick, Stephen Lang, Stephen Root, Glenn Morshower, Waleed Zuaiter, Nick Offerman, Rebecca Mader, Tim Griffin, Fawad Siddiqui, Matt Newton, Robert Curtis Brown, Hrach Titizian, Sean Curley, Terry Serpico, Diego Serrano, Kevin Geer, Steve Witting, George W. Bush, Saddam Hussein	
N O V E M B E R	6	Precious	Lionsgate	Lee Daniels (director); Geoffrey S. Fletcher (screenplay); Gabourey Sidibe, Paula Patton, Mo'Nique, Mariah Carey, Sherri Shepherd, Lenny Kravitz, Nealla Gordon, Stephanie Andujar, Chyna Layne, Xosha Roquemore, Grace Hightower, Bill Sage, Kimberly Russell, Ramona "Sapphire" Lofton, Amina Robinson, Aunt Dot, Angelic Zambrana, Quishay Powell	
N O V E M B E R	6	That Evening Sun	Dogwood Entertainment	Scott Teems (director/screenplay); Hal Holbrook, Ray McKinnon, Walton Goggins, Mia Wasikowska, Carrie Preston, Barry Corbin, Dixie Carter, Barlow Jacobs, Brian Keith, Anthony Reynolds	
N O V E M B E R	13	2012	Columbia Pictures / Centropolis Entertainment	Roland Emmerich (director/screenplay); Harald Kloser (screenplay); John Cusack, Chiwetel Ejiofor, Amanda Peet, Oliver Platt, Thandie Newton, Danny Glover, Woody Harrelson, Liam James, Morgan Lily, Tom McCarthy, Zlatko Burić, Beatrice Rosen, Johann Urb, John Billingsley, Ryan McDonald, Jimi Mistry, Agam Darshi, Chin Han, Osric Chau, Tseng Chang, Lisa Lu, George Segal, Stephen McHattie, Patrick Bauchau, Henry O, Karin Konoval, Michael Buffer, Dean Marshall, Zinaid Memišević, Frank C. Turner, Blu Mankuma	
N O V E M B E R	13	The Boat That Rocked aka Pirate Radio	Focus Features / Working Title Films	Richard Curtis (director/screenplay); Tom Sturridge, Philip Seymour Hoffman, Bill Nighy, Nick Frost, Rhys Ifans, Katherine Parkinson, Talulah Riley, Kenneth Branagh, Jack Davenport, Ralph Brown, January Jones, Emma Thompson, Chris O'Dowd, Rhys Darby, Will Adamsdale, Tom Wisdom, Gemma Arterton, Sinead Matthews, Stephen Moore, Olegar Fedoro, Ant McPartlin, Declan Donnelly (Ant & Dec)	
N O V E M B E R	13	Dare	Image Entertainment	Adam Salky (director); Emmy Rossum, Zach Gilford, Ashley Springer, Sandra Bernhard	
N O V E M B E R	13	Fantastic Mr. Fox	20th Century Fox / Indian Paintbrush / Regency Enterprises	Wes Anderson (director/screenplay); Noah Baumbach (screenplay); George Clooney, Meryl Streep, Jason Schwartzman, Bill Murray, Owen Wilson, Willem Dafoe, Michael Gambon, Wallace Wolodarsky, Eric Chase Anderson, Jarvis Cocker, Wes Anderson, Hugo Guinness, Helen McCrory, Karen Duffy, Roman Coppola, Garth Jennings, Brian Cox, Jeremy Dawson, Mario Batali, Adrien Brody, Robin Hurlstone, Juman Malouf, Steven Rales, James Hamilton, Jennifer Furches	
N O V E M B E R	13	The Messenger	Oscilloscope Pictures / Omnilab Media / Sherezade Films / The Mark Gordon Company	Oren Moverman (director/screenplay); Alessandro Camon (screenplay); Ben Foster, Woody Harrelson, Samantha Morton, Jena Malone, Eamonn Walker, Merritt Wever, Jeremy Strong, Gaius Charles	
N O V E M B E R	13	Uncertainty	IFC Films	Scott McGehee, David Siegel (directors/screenplay); Lynn Collins, Joseph Gordon-Levitt, Assumpta Serna, Olivia Thirlby	
N O V E M B E R	13	Women in Trouble	Screen Media Films	Sebastian Gutierrez (director); Carla Gugino, Connie Britton, Emmanuelle Chriqui, Marley Shelton, Elizabeth Berkley, Cameron Richardson, Adrianne Palicki, Joseph Gordon-Levitt	
N O V E M B E R	20	Bad Lieutenant: Port of Call New Orleans	First Look Studios / Millennium Films / Saturn Films	Werner Herzog (director); William M. Finklestein (screenplay); Nicolas Cage, Eva Mendes, Val Kilmer, Alvin "Xzibit" Joiner, Jennifer Coolidge, Brad Dourif, Fairuza Balk, Irma P. Hall, Tom Bower, Michael Shannon, Vondie Curtis-Hall, Shawn Hatosy, Denzel Whitaker, Shea Whigham, Katie Chonacas, Lucius Baston, Tim Bellow, Sam Velasquez	
N O V E M B E R	20	The Blind Side	Warner Bros. Pictures / Alcon Entertainment	John Lee Hancock (director/screenplay); Sandra Bullock, Tim McGraw, Quinton Aaron, Kathy Bates, Lily Collins, Jae Head, Ray McKinnon, Kim Dickens, Adriane Lenox, Phillip Fulmer, Lou Holtz, Tom Lemming, Houston Nutt, Ed Orgeron, Franklin "Pepper" Rodgers, Nick Saban, Tommy Tuberville, Hugh Freeze	
N O V E M B E R	20	Planet 51	TriStar Pictures / Ilion Animation Studios / HandMade Films	Jorge Blanco (director); Joe Stillman (screenplay); Dwayne Johnson, Jessica Biel, Justin Long, Seann William Scott, Gary Oldman, John Cleese, James Corden, Mathew Horne, Rupert Degas, Alan Marriott, Freddie Benedict	
N O V E M B E R	20	The Twilight Saga: New Moon	Summit Entertainment	Chris Weitz (director); Melissa Rosenberg (screenplay); Kristen Stewart, Robert Pattinson, Taylor Lautner, Nikki Reed, Ashley Greene, Billy Burke, Peter Facinelli, Elizabeth Reaser, Kellan Lutz, Jackson Rathbone, Michael Sheen, Dakota Fanning, Rachelle Lefevre, Edi Gathegi, Michael Welch, Anna Kendrick, Justin Chon, Christian Serratos, Gil Birmingham, Cameron Bright, Christopher Heyerdahl, Graham Greene, Jamie Campbell Bower, Daniel Cudmore, Chaske Spencer, Noot Seear, Tyson Houseman, Kiowa Gordon, Alex Meraz, Bronson Pelletier, Tinsel Korey, Justine Wachsberger, Charlie Bewley	
N O V E M B E R	24	Santa Buddies	Walt Disney Studios Home Entertainment / Keystone Entertainment / Key Pix Productions	Robert Vince (director/screenplay); Anna McRoberts (screenplay); Christopher Lloyd, Danny Woodburn, Craig Anton, Ben Giroux, Paul Rae, George Wendt, Tom Bosley, Field Cate, Tim Conway, Chris Coppola, Josh Flitter, Skyler Gisondo, Zachary Gordon, Richard Kind, Kaitlyn Maher, Liliana Mumy, Ty Panitz, Ellie Harvie, Gig Morton, Quinn Lord, Jonathan Morgan Heit, Aramis Knight, Michael Teigen, Nico Ghisi, Ryan Grantham, Nic Novicki, Sophia Ludwig, Andrew Astor	
N O V E M B E R	25	Me and Orson Welles	Freestyle Releasing	Richard Linklater (director); Holly Gent Palmo, Vincent Palmo, Jr. (screenplay); Zac Efron, Christian McKay, Claire Danes, Ben Chaplin, James Tupper, Kelly Reilly, Eddie Marsan, Zoe Kazan	
N O V E M B E R	25	Ninja Assassin	Warner Bros. Pictures / Legendary Pictures / Dark Castle Entertainment / Silver Pictures	James McTeigue (director); Matthew Sand, J. Michael Straczynski (screenplay); Rain, Naomie Harris, Ben Miles, Rick Yune, Sho Kosugi, Randall Duk Kim, Sung Kang, Ill-Young Kim, Linh-Dan Pham, Adriana Altaras, Eleonore Weisgerber, Stephen Marcus, Tim Williams, David Leitch, Lee Joon, Anna Sawai, Wladimir Tarasjanz, Thorston Manderlay, Richard Van Weyden, Sungwoong Yoon, Kylie Liya Goldstein	
N O V E M B E R	25	Old Dogs	Walt Disney Pictures / Tapestry Films	Walt Becker (director); David Diamond, David Weissman (screenplay); John Travolta, Robin Williams, Kelly Preston, Bernie Mac, Seth Green, Lori Loughlin, Matt Dillon, Ella Bleu Travolta, Ann-Margret, Rita Wilson, Amy Sedaris, Justin Long, Dax Shepard, Luis Guzmán, Sab Shimono, Laura Allen, Bradley Steven Perry, Dylan Sprayberry, Paulo Costanzo, DeRay Davis, Paul Thornton, Residente, Tom Woodruff Jr., Conner Rayburn, Kevin W. Yamada	
N O V E M B E R	25	The Road	The Weinstein Company / Dimension Films	John Hillcoat (director); Joe Penhall (screenplay); Viggo Mortensen, Kodi Smit-McPhee, Charlize Theron, Robert Duvall, Guy Pearce	
N O V E M B E R	27	The Private Lives of Pippa Lee	Screen Media Films	Rebecca Miller (director); Robin Wright, Alan Arkin, Maria Bello, Monica Bellucci, Blake Lively, Julianne Moore, Keanu Reeves, Winona Ryder	
D E C E M B E R	2	Made for Each Other	IFC Films	Daryl Goldberg (director); Danny Masterson, Patrick Warburton, Christopher Masterson, Bijou Phillips, Samm Levine, George Segal, Lauren German, Leslie Hendrix, Kelsey Fowler, Kyle Howard, Andrew van den Houten	
D E C E M B E R	4	Armored	Screen Gems	Nimród Antal (director); Sam Raimi (screenplay); Columbus Short, Matt Dillon, Laurence Fishburne, Jean Reno, Skeet Ulrich, Fred Ward, Milo Ventimiglia, Amaury Nolasco, Andre Kinney	
D E C E M B E R	4	Brothers	Lionsgate / Relativity Media	Jim Sheridan (director); David Benioff (screenplay); Tobey Maguire, Jake Gyllenhaal, Natalie Portman, Sam Shepard, Mare Winningham, Bailee Madison, Patrick Flueger, Carey Mulligan, Clifton Collins Jr., Jenny Wade, Omid Abtahi, Navid Negahban, Ethan Suplee, Taylor Geare, Enayat Delawary, Arron Shiver, Ray Prewitt	
D E C E M B E R	4	Everybody's Fine	Miramax Films	Kirk Jones (director/screenplay); Robert De Niro, Drew Barrymore, Kate Beckinsale, Sam Rockwell, Katherine Moennig, Melissa Leo, Damian Young, James Frain, Seamus Davey-Fitzpatrick, Austin Lysy, Lucian Maisel, Sonja Stuart, Mimi Lieber, Mackenzie Milone, Lily Mo Sheen, Chandler Frantz	
D E C E M B E R	4	Transylmania	Full Circle Releasing	David Hillenbrand, Scott Hillenbrand (directors); Patrick Cavanaugh, James DeBello, Tony Denman, Musetta Vander, Jennifer Lyons, Oren Skoog, Paul H. Kim, David Steinberg, Irena A. Hoffman	
D E C E M B E R	4	Until the Light Takes Us	Variance Films	Aaron Aites, Audrey Ewell (directors); Gylve "Fenriz" Nagell, Varg "Count Grishnackh" Vikernes, Jan Axel "Hellhammer" Blomberg, Kjetil-Vidar "Frost" Haraldstad, Harmony Korine, Bjarne Melgaard, Kristoffer "Garm" Rygg, Bård "Faust" Eithun	
D E C E M B E R	4	Up in the Air	Paramount Pictures / The Montecito Picture Company	Jason Reitman (director/screenplay); Sheldon Turner (screenplay); George Clooney, Vera Farmiga, Anna Kendrick, Jason Bateman, Melanie Lynskey, Danny McBride, Amy Morton, Sam Elliott, J.K. Simmons, Zach Galifianakis, Tamala Jones, Adhir Kalyan, Cut Chemist	
D E C E M B E R	9	Trick 'r Treat	Warner Premiere / Legendary Pictures / Bad Hat Harry Productions	Michael Dougherty (director); Dylan Baker, Rochelle Aytes, Quinn Lord, Lauren Lee Smith, Moneca Delain, Tahmoh Penikett, Leslie Bibb, Anna Paquin, Brain Cox	
D E C E M B E R	11	Invictus	Warner Bros. Pictures / Spyglass Entertainment	Clint Eastwood (director); Anthony Peckham (screenplay); Morgan Freeman, Matt Damon, Scott Eastwood, Tony Kgoroge, Adjoa Andoh, Julian Lewis Jones, Patrick Mofokeng, Leleti Khumalo, McNeil Hendricks, Zak Feaunati, Grant L. Roberts, Robin B. Smith, Sean Cameron Michael, Danny Keogh, Bonnie Henna, Hennie Bosman, Matt Stern, Kgosi Mongape	
D E C E M B E R	11	The Lovely Bones	Paramount Pictures / DreamWorks Pictures	Peter Jackson (director/screenplay); Saoirse Ronan, Mark Wahlberg, Rachel Weisz, Susan Sarandon, Stanley Tucci, Rose McIver, Michael Imperioli, Amanda Michalka, Reece Ritchie, Carolyn Dando, Charlie Saxton, Nikki SooHoo, Jake Abel, Tom McCarthy	
D E C E M B E R	11	My Son, My Son, What Have Ye Done?	IFC Films	Werner Herzog (director); Michael Shannon, Willem Dafoe, Chloë Sevigny, Udo Kier	
D E C E M B E R	11	The Princess and the Frog	Walt Disney Pictures / Walt Disney Animation Studios	John Musker, Ron Clements (directors/screenplay); Rob Edwards (screenplay); Anika Noni Rose, Bruno Campos, Keith David, Michael-Leon Wooley, Jennifer Cody, Jim Cummings, Peter Bartlett, Jenifer Lewis, Oprah Winfrey, Terrence Howard, John Goodman, Don Hall, Paul Briggs, Corey Burton, Michael Colyar, Emeril Lagasse, Kevin Michael Richardson, Randy Newman, Terence Blanchard, Kwesi Boakye, Roger Aaron Brown, Peter Del Vecho, Jeff Draheim, Rob Edwards, Eddie Frierson, Bridget Hoffman, Rif Hutton, John Kassir, Mona Marshall, John Musker, Phil Proctor, Peter Renaday, Kimberly Russell, Bruce W. Smith, Fred Tatasciore, Claudette Wells, Joe Whyte, Mick Wingert	
D E C E M B E R	11	A Single Man	The Weinstein Company	Tom Ford (director/screenplay); David Scearce (screenplay); Colin Firth, Julianne Moore, Matthew Goode, Nicholas Hoult, Jon Kortajarena, Ryan Simpkins, Ginnifer Goodwin, Teddy Sears, Lee Pace, Erin Daniels, Aline Weber, Jon Hamm, Paulette Lamori, Paul Butler, Aaron Sanders	
D E C E M B E R	11	The Slammin' Salmon	Anchor Bay Films	Kevin Heffernan (director); Broken Lizard (screenplay); Michael Clarke Duncan, Jay Chandrasekhar, Kevin Heffernan, Steve Lemme, Paul Soter, Erik Stolhanske, Cobie Smulders, April Bowlby, Olivia Munn, Nat Faxon, Lance Henriksen, Sendhil Ramamurthy, Vivica A. Fox, Morgan Fairchild, Jeff Chase, Carla Gallo, Jim Gaffigan, Will Forte	
D E C E M B E R	16	Crazy Heart	Fox Searchlight Pictures	Scott Cooper (director/screenplay); Jeff Bridges, Maggie Gyllenhaal, Colin Farrell, Robert Duvall, Beth Grant, Sarah Jane Morris, Paul Herman, Ryan Bingham, Tom Bower, James Keane, Annie Corley, Jack Nation, Rick Dial	
D E C E M B E R	18	Avatar	20th Century Fox / Lightstorm Entertainment	James Cameron (director/screenplay); Sam Worthington, Zoe Saldaña, Sigourney Weaver, Giovanni Ribisi, Michelle Rodriguez, Stephen Lang, CCH Pounder, Joel David Moore, Dileep Rao, Wes Studi, Laz Alonso, Matt Gerald, Peter Mensah, Debra Wilson Skelton, James Gaylyn	
D E C E M B E R	18	Did You Hear About the Morgans?	Columbia Pictures / Relativity Media / Castle Rock Entertainment	Marc Lawrence (director/screenplay); Hugh Grant, Sarah Jessica Parker, Sam Elliott, Mary Steenburgen, Elisabeth Moss, Michael Kelly, Wilford Brimley, Seth Gilliam, Kim Shaw, David Call, Kevin Brown, Steven Boyer, Bart the Bear 2	
D E C E M B E R	18	The New Daughter	Anchor Bay Entertainment	Luis Berdejo (director); John Travis (screenplay); Kevin Costner, Ivana Baquero, Samantha Mathis	
D E C E M B E R	18	Nine	The Weinstein Company / Relativity Media	Rob Marshall (director); Michael Tolkin, Anthony Minghella (screenplay); Daniel Day-Lewis, Marion Cotillard, Penélope Cruz, Judi Dench, Fergie, Kate Hudson, Nicole Kidman, Sophia Loren, Ricky Tognazzi, Giuseppe Cederna, Elio Germano, Valerio Mastandrea, Martina Stella, Roberto Citran, Andy Pessoa, John Terry, Vincent Riotta, Max Procaccini	
D E C E M B E R	22	American Pie Presents: The Book of Love	Universal Pictures	John Putch (director); Bug Hall, Brandon Hardesty, Kevin M. Horton, Beth Behrs, Melanie Papalia, Jennifer Holland, John Patrick Jordan, Louisa Lytton, Sherman Hemsley, Curtis Armstrong, Jim Wynorski, Rosanna Arquette, Eugene Levy	
D E C E M B E R	23	Alvin and the Chipmunks: The Squeakquel	20th Century Fox / Fox 2000 Pictures / Regency Enterprises	Betty Thomas (director); Jon Vitti, Jonathan Aibel, Glenn Berger (screenplay); Zachary Levi, David Cross, Jason Lee, Justin Long, Matthew Gray Gubler, Jesse McCartney, Christina Applegate, Anna Faris, Amy Poehler, Wendie Malick, Anjelah Johnson, Kathryn Joosten, Kevin G. Schmidt, Chris Warren Jr., Bridgit Mendler, Aimee Carrero, Alexandra Shipp, Gregg Binkley, Charice Pempengco, Bernard White, Joy Osmanski, Archie Hahn, Lanny Joon, Brando Eaton, Honor Society, Eric Bauza, Sean Astin, Rachele Brooke Smith, Quest Crew, Ross Bagdasarian Jr., Janice Karman	
D E C E M B E R	25	It's Complicated	Universal Pictures / Relativity Media	Nancy Meyers (director/screenplay); Meryl Streep, Steve Martin, Alec Baldwin, John Krasinski, Lake Bell, Mary Kay Place, Rita Wilson, Alexandra Wentworth, Hunter Parrish, Zoe Kazan, Caitlin FitzGerald, Emjay Anthony, Nora Dunn, Bruce Altman, Robert Curtis Brown, James Patrick Stuart, Peter Mackenzie, Pat Finn, Valente Rodriguez, Emily Kinney, Lisa Lynn Masters, Andrew Stewart-Jones, Blanchard Ryan, Geneva Carr, Deidre Goodwin, Jessica St. Clair, Marina Squerciati, Robert Adamson, Heitor Pereira, Ramin Djawadi, Jimmy Clabots, Alan Cumming, Anne Lockhart, Oprah Winfrey	
D E C E M B E R	25	Sherlock Holmes	Warner Bros. Pictures / Village Roadshow Pictures / Silver Pictures	Guy Ritchie (director); Michael Robert Johnson, Anthony Peckham, Simon Kinberg (screenplay); Robert Downey Jr., Jude Law, Rachel McAdams, Mark Strong, Eddie Marsan, Geraldine James, James Fox, Kelly Reilly, Robert Maillet, Hans Matheson, William Hope, William Houston, Andrew Jack	
D E C E M B E R	30	The Loss of a Teardrop Diamond	Screen Media Films	Jodie Markell (director); Bryce Dallas Howard, Chris Evans, Ellen Burstyn, Ann-Margret, Jennifer Sipes	

== See also ==
- List of 2009 box office number-one films in the United States
- 2009 in the United States
