= After Last Season =

2009 film directed by Mark Region

- Promotional release poster
- Directed by: Mark Region
- Written by: Mark Region
- Produced by: Mark Region; Robert Hill; Gary Rolen
- Starring: Jason Kulas; Peggy McClellan; Scott Winters; Casey McDougal
- Cinematography: Mark Region
- Edited by: Vincent Grass
- Music by: Michael Windham
- Production company: Index Square
- Distributed by: Index Square
- Release date: June 5, 2009
- Running time: 93 minutes
- Country: United States
- Language: English
- Budget: $5 million

After Last Season is a 2009 American science-fiction psychological thriller film written, directed, produced, and shot by Mark Region. The film stars Jason Kulas and Peggy McClellan as medical students who use experimental neural microchips to discover the identity of a killer who has been murdering their classmates.

The film received negative reviews, with criticism being aimed at its acting, sets, visuals, animations, editing, and script. It is considered to be one of the worst films ever made.

== Premise ==
Matthew Andrews and Sarah Austin are medical interns studying neurology at the Prorolis Corporation. When a serial killer begins murdering their fellow students, they use experimental chips to visualize the events of the crimes. They conclude through these visualizations that they may be able to see, and therefore prevent, the next murder before it occurs, and learn that the killer is a ghost. It is revealed at the end of the film that the events were all a dream.

== Cast ==
- Jason Kulas as Matthew Andrews
- Peggy McClellan as Sarah Austin
- Scott Winters as Dr. John Marlen
- Casey McDougal as Anne Plaven
- Joan-Marie Dewsnap as Haley Marlen

== Production ==
Director Mark Region has cited The Sixth Sense and The Exorcist as inspirations for After Last Season. The film was shot on 35mm film, and principal photography took place over five or six days in one house with fake medical equipment made from cardboard. According to Region, the film had a budget of $5 million, with $30,000 to $40,000 spent on filming and the majority of the remaining amount spent on the film's animated neural visualization sequences.

== Release and reception ==
The trailer for After Last Season was released in March 2009. Rumors circulated online that the trailer was part of a viral marketing campaign by director Spike Jonze, in promotion of his then-upcoming film Where the Wild Things Are. Several websites questioned whether director Mark Region was a real person. Lindsay Robertson of Stereogum wrote that the trailer "seems like it could only have been made in a parallel universe that irony forgot. Or written and directed by a small child."

The film premiered on June 5, 2009, receiving a limited release in Lancaster, California; Austin, Texas; North Aurora, Illinois; and Rochester, New York. Among the audience members who attended these screenings, a viewer in Rochester called the film "amazingly bad". Another in Austin characterized it as "a total mindfuck. It can really only be described as a lesson in self control because at first, I wanted to leave, then I wanted to scream at the movie, then it became funny, and then it reached that level where it crawls under your skin and agitates you with the questions that rise from having been witness to it."

Film critic Scott Von Doviak wrote that the film is "intensely boring, thoroughly disorienting and so technically incompetent it achieves several deeply unnerving effects entirely by accident." C. Robert Cargill, writing for Ain't It Cool News, referred to the film as not only the worst movie of 2009, but the "worst theatrically distributed film of the modern era." Writing for Collider, Jeremy Urquhart included the film on his list of the worst films ever made, stating that it is "Lynchian, or maybe it’s more accidentally Lynchian."

== See also ==
- List of 21st-century films considered the worst
