= Murray Gershenz =

American actor

- Born: May 12, 1922; New York City, U.S.
- Died: August 28, 2013 (aged 91); Los Angeles, California, U.S.
- Occupation(s): Actor, entrepreneur
- Years active: 1938–2013 (entrepreneur); 2001–2013 (acting)
- Children: 3

Murray Gershenz (May 12, 1922 – August 28, 2013) was an American character actor and entrepreneur. He began his acting career late in life, at the age of 79, when he starred in a 2001 episode of Will & Grace. He went on to perform a variety of character roles in films and on television. As an entrepreneur, he operated the Music Man Murray record store in Los Angeles for more than 50 years.

== Career ==
He acted in other television shows, such as Modern Family, The Sarah Silverman Program, Mad Men, Raising Hope, House, and Parks and Recreation. He also appeared in films, such as I Love You, Man (2009), The Incredible Burt Wonderstone (2013), and The Hangover (2009), where he played Felix, an elderly man who fully disrobes in one scene.

== Personal life ==
Gershenz was born in New York City on May 12, 1922, and raised in a Jewish household. An avid vinyl record collector, at the age of 16, he began collecting records, which turned into a $1.5 million stockpile of over 300,000 records for his shop located in West Adams, Los Angeles, California.

Gershenz was quoted as saying, "You never stop buying because you never know what someone is going to want." His desire to sell his collection became the subject of a 2011 documentary film, titled Music Man Murray, after his nickname and the name of his store. Presumably as a direct result of worldwide festival audiences' exposure to the film, in June 2013, he sold the entire collection to a buyer either from New York City or Brazil, sources vary on this detail and neither he nor the family have ever publicly released this information.

== Death ==
Gershenz died of a heart attack on August 28, 2013, aged 91, in Los Angeles.
