= Michael Alan Vadini =

Michael Alan Vadini is an American entrepreneur, businessman and founder & co-founder of seven companies including Prima Consulting, TITAN Technology Partners Limited, Skylark Productions, SignUpGenius, Torus Sphere, Inc., and Infocenter. Vadini is also a former candidate for the North Carolina Senate.

== Career ==
Vadini received a B.A. in Business Administration from Baldwin Wallace University and attended the MBA program at Case Western Reserve University but left before completing his degree.

In 1994, Vadini founded and managed Prima Consulting, an IT consulting business that he sold in 1997 for $30 million. Vadini then founded TITAN Technology Partners Limited in 1998. TITAN operated as a consulting, technology services and outsourcing company for cloud-based hosting and application management. TITAN was headquartered in Charlotte, North Carolina with offices in London, United Kingdom, Singapore, and Pune, India.

A 2008 article in Entrepreneur magazine outlined Vadini’s handling of TITAN stock as dot-com-era stock weathered downturns across the industry. Vadini gave investors two shares for every share already owned, cutting his ownership of the company by 25 percent. Vadini stated, "If you do the right thing, good things happen. Our investors showed patience and support, and in return, we were good to them."

On 1 April 2014, Velocity Technology Solutions, Inc. a cloud application hosting for enterprise and business software, announced the acquisition of TITAN Technology Partners, Limited. Revenue from the combined companies totaled over $150 million worldwide. As a result of the acquisition, Vadini joined as President of the Titan division of Velocity.

During his career, Vadini led the development and execution of IT Strategy at the following companies: Dunlop-Maxfli Corporation, Procter & Gamble, BellSouth, The Goodyear Tire & Rubber Company, National City Corporation, Invacare, SCANA Corporation, Corning, Hoechst Celanese, Sara Lee, Dyersburg Fabric, Pioneer Standard Electronics, American Electric Power, Duke Power, Exel Corporation, Brunswick Corporation, JM Huber, Lydall Corporation, Michelin, OM Group, Realty One Corporation and Piedmont Natural Gas.

Vadini founded and co-owned SignUpGenius, a freemium and subscription software (SaaS) that assists groups with organizing social activities. In 2014 Signup Genius ranked as the 880th most popular US website according to Alexa.com.

On July 10, 2017 SignUpGenius announced a strategic majority investment by Providence Strategic Growth, the growth equity affiliate of Providence Equity Partners.

In 2014, Vadini founded Torus Sphere, Inc. a software company offering its flagship product on e-commerce data visualization and predictive analytics.

On May 1, 2024 Arizona based Insight Enterprises, a global Fortune 500 solutions integrator acquired Infocenter. Insight acquired Infocenter with the goal of boosting its ServiceNow consulting and managed services business to Insight’s automation portfolio.

== Television & film ==
American Entrepreneur was a business TV show running on PBS from 2005 to 2006 that showcased prominent business entrepreneurs across the Carolinas. Taken from IMDb page: “In a 30-minute television interview, serial entrepreneur Michael A. Vadini uncovers the accomplishments, hardships and lessons learned from the founders, CEOs, and Presidents of some of America's most tenacious companies.”

Vadini acted as executive producer on two independent films, Swimming in a Lake of Fire (2010) and Esposito (2011). Both were produced by Vadini’s company, Skylark Productions.

== N.C. Senate ==
Vadini ran in the 2012 election for North Carolina State Senate in District 37. He ran unopposed in the Republican primary and lost to Daniel G. Clodfelter (Democrat) in the general election. Vadini listed his top priorities as: mortgage reform, judicial reform, education in our district, reforming transportation spending, reforming our tax structure.

== Awards & features ==
- 2006 Finalist for the Carolinas Entrepreneur of the Year Award sponsored by Ernst & Young
- 2008 Finalist for the Carolinas Entrepreneur of the Year Award sponsored by Ernst & Young
- 2008 Entrepreneur Magazine feature “Loyalty Pays: Show Investors You Care, and They’ll Show You the Money”
- School of Communications Advisory Board at Elon University (2006-2014)
- Trustee at Baldwin Wallace University (2014–Present)
