= E. Spencer Schubert =

American artist and sculptor

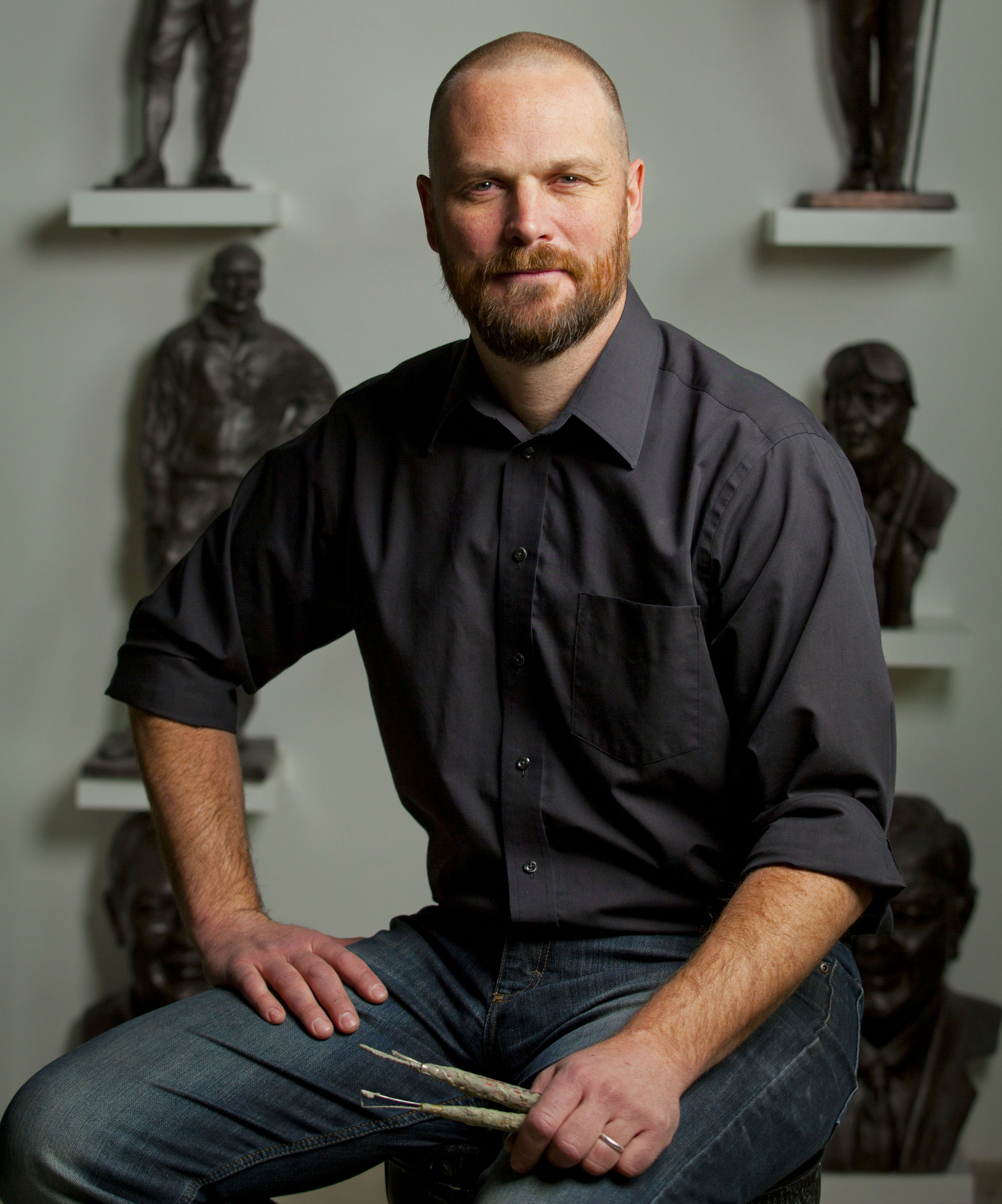
- Born: Edward Spencer Schubert; United States
- Education: University of Kansas (B.F.A.)
- Known for: Busts, monumental sculpture
- Movement: Atelier Movement
- Website: www.esschubert.com

E. Spencer Schubert (also known as E.S. Schubert) is an American artist and sculptor known for his busts and monumental sculpture. He has created monuments for a variety of cities, universities and private collections including three monumental sculptures of town founders in Fort Smith, Arkansas, the Sacred Heart of Jesus sculpture for Benedictine College and a sculpture of football coach Bill Snyder for Kansas State University.

== Biography ==
Schubert initially trained as a silversmith before becoming interested in sculpture while studying at the University of Kansas. After graduating, he spent "three to four years working in a basement perfecting the skill of making clay look like people" before launching his studio. Since 2011, he has sculpted a majority of the new inductees to the Hall of Famous Missourians.

Schubert has cited the work of French sculptor Auguste Rodin as a significant influence on his style. When sculpting real persons, Schubert studies the personalities of his subjects to learn about the "undefinable things that have nothing to do with the length of his femur."

He is interested in Stoicism and has created a series of busts of Stoic philosophers including Seneca the Younger and Marcus Aurelius.

== Career ==
Schubert's busts for the Hall of Famous Missourians include sculptures of plaintiff Dred Scott, Negro league baseball coach Buck O'Neil, science fiction author Robert A. Heinlein, country music singer Porter Wagoner and creator of the Missouri state flag Marie Oliver.

He was at the center of controversy when, in 2012, he was hired to sculpt the politically charged Limbaugh. Schubert received "700 angry messages of some sort" condemning him for creating the sculpture and "assuming he was an advocate of Limbaugh's." In response, he criticized the idea that artists cannot create portraits of figures with whom they disagree, saying that "if it were left to sculptors to choose who was honored with portraits, the entire history of portraiture would look dramatically different." The bust is on display in the Missouri State Capitol.

In 2013, Kansas State University unveiled Schubert's 1,800-pound bronze sculpture of football coach Bill Snyder, which stands at the entrance of Bill Snyder Family Football Stadium. The university uses the statue to host endurance competitions in which students must touch the statue continuously for 31 hours.

Schubert's 2016 sculpture Sacred Heart of Jesus, created for Benedictine College, was modeled on the Shroud of Turin and depicts fourteen folds representing the Stations of the Cross. In response to a Confederate statue being removed from his city in 2017, Schubert offered to donate a replacement sculpture that would represent unity and uplift the community.

In 2019, Schubert designed the three sculptures serving as the centerpiece of Gateway Park in Fort Smith, Arkansas. The statues were of local heroes Judge Isaac C. Parker, educator John Carnall, and Mother Superior Mary Teresa Farrell. That year, he also designed and produced a statue of William Webb for the Webb Institute in Glen Cove, New York. Spencer partnered with Ryan Holiday and The Daily Stoic on a bust of Marcus Aurelius.

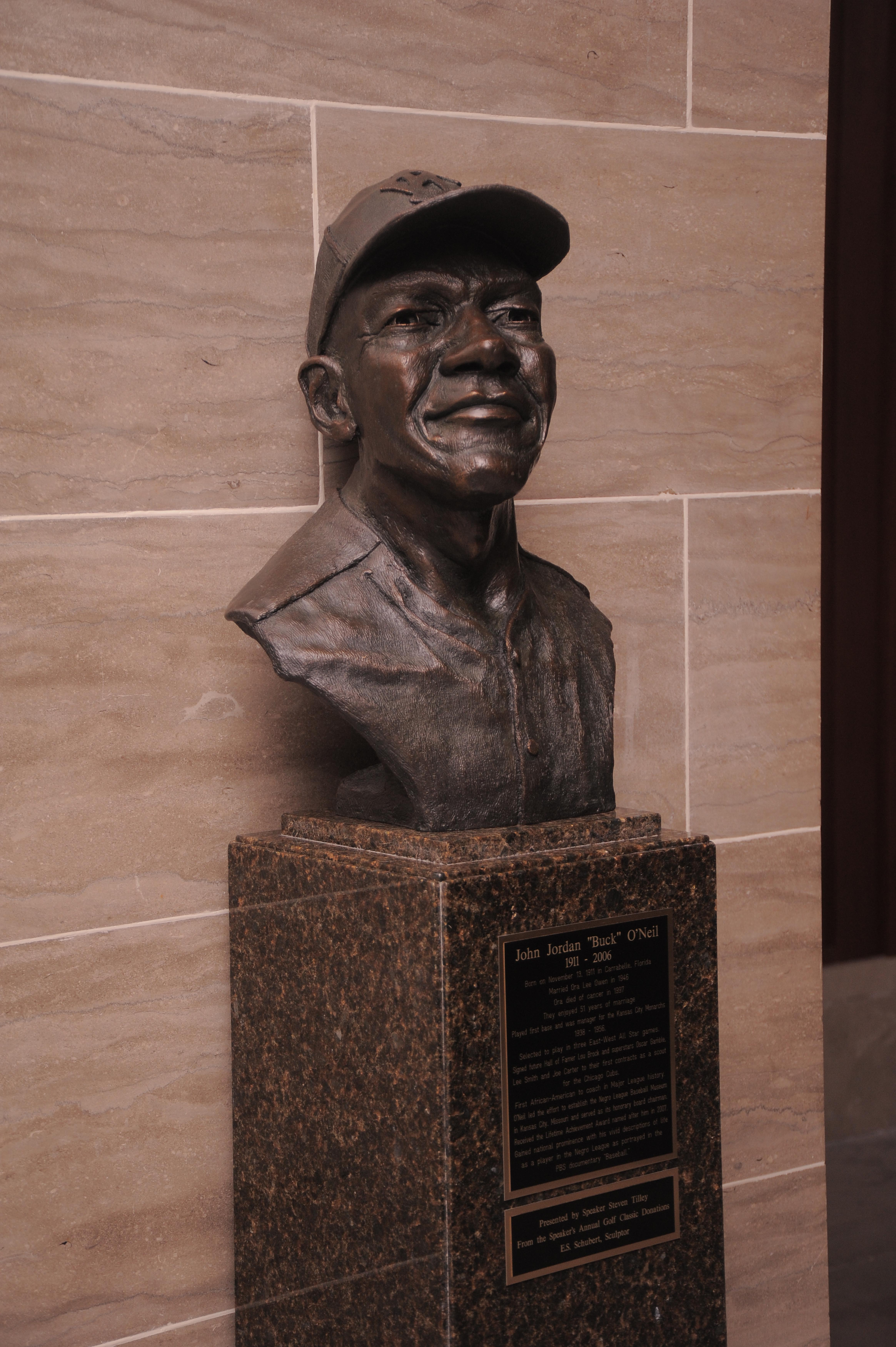
Sculpture bust of Buck O'Neil in Hall of Famous Missourians

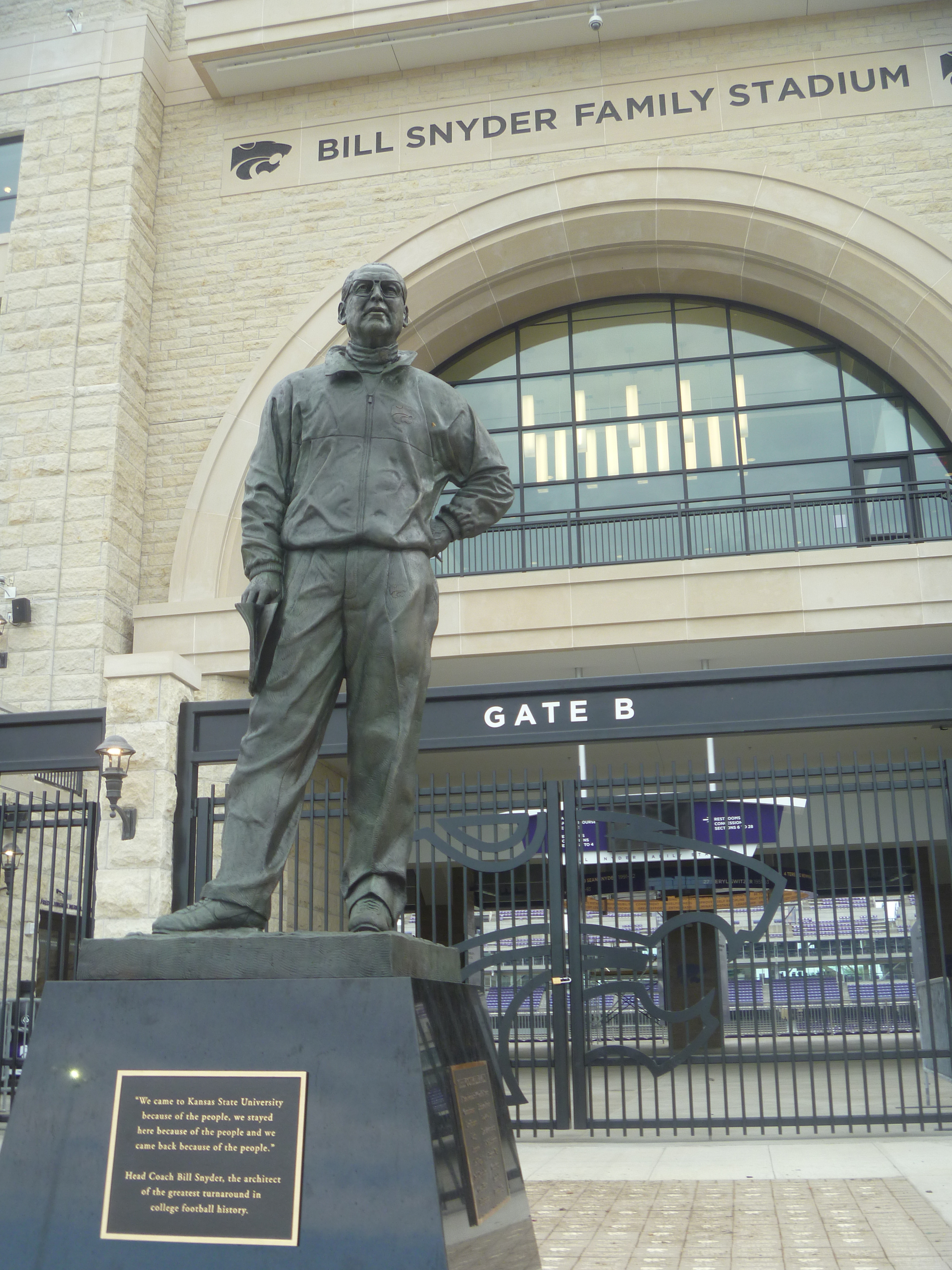
Sculpture of Coach Bill Snyder at Kansas State University

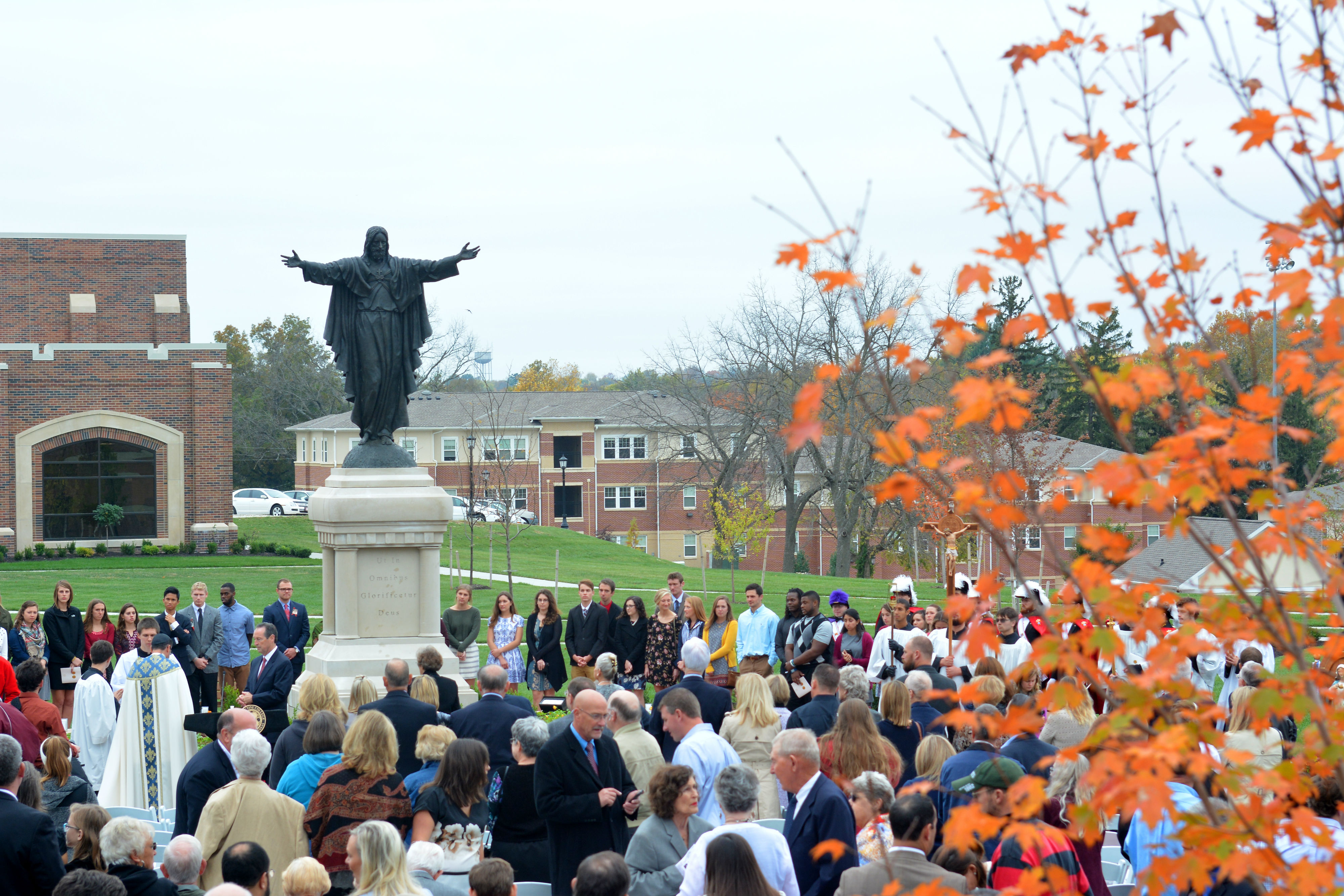
Sculpture of Sacred Heart of Jesus. Monument at Benedictine College, Atchison

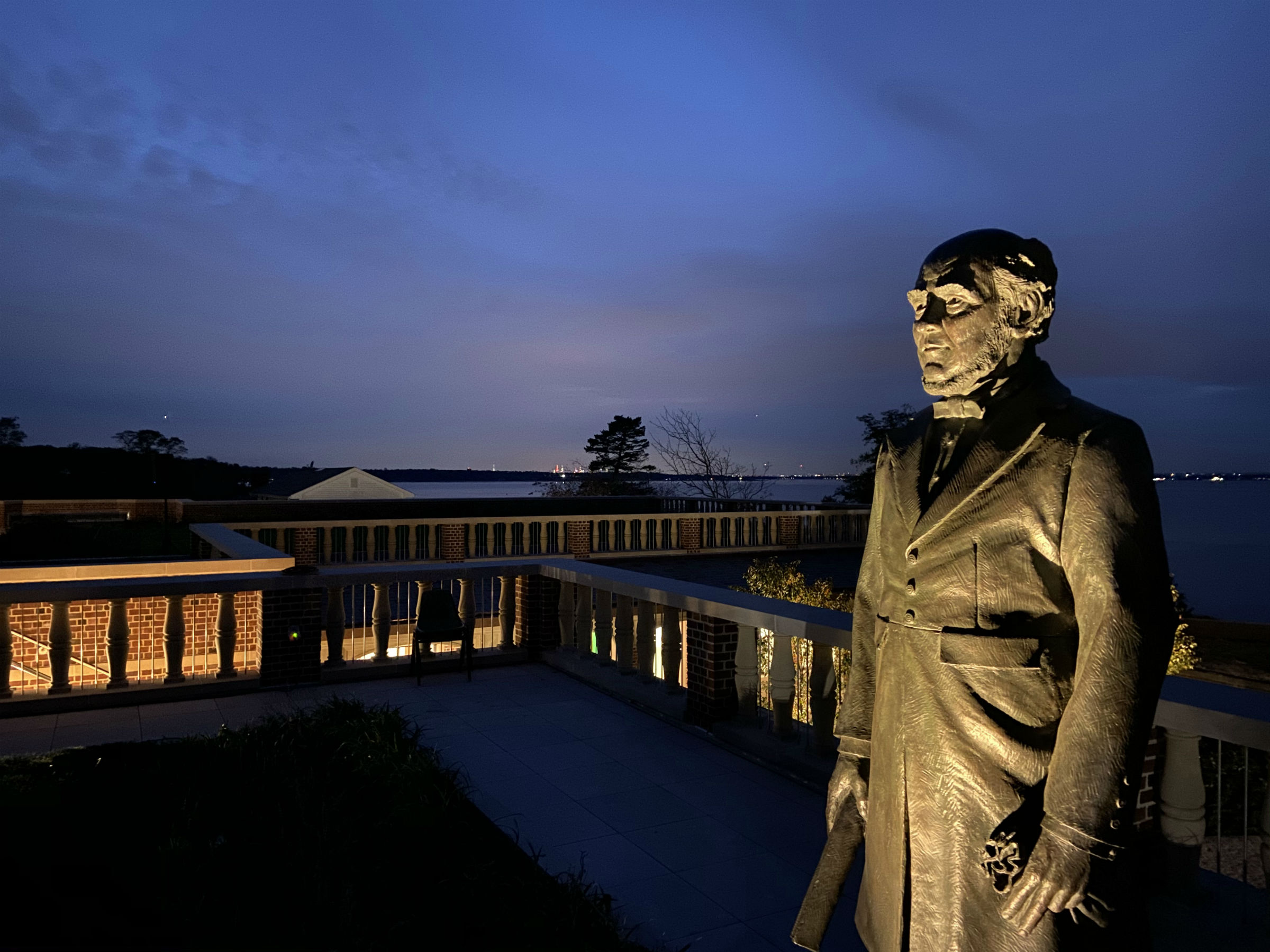
Sculpture of William Webb at the Webb Institute, Glen Cove, New York
