= The Daily Stoic =

2016 book by Ryan Holiday

The Daily Stoic: 366 Meditations on Wisdom, Perseverance, and the Art of Living
- First edition (US)
- Author: Ryan Holiday, Stephen Hanselman
- Language: English
- Subject: Stoicism
- Genre: Non-fiction, daily devotional
- Publisher: Portfolio (US); Profile Books (UK)
- Publication date: October 18, 2016
- Publication place: United States
- Media type: Hardcover, paperback, ebook
- Pages: 416
- ISBN: 978-0-7352-1173-5 (Hardcover)
- LC Class: B528.H65 2016
- Preceded by: Ego Is the Enemy
- Website: dailystoic.com

The Daily Stoic: 366 Meditations on Wisdom, Perseverance, and the Art of Living is a daily motivational book of stoic philosophy co-authored by Ryan Holiday and Stephen Hanselman. It is Holiday's fifth book and Hanselman's debut as an author.

== Synopsis ==
The Daily Stoic is an original translation of selections from several stoic philosophers including Epictetus, Marcus Aurelius, Seneca, Musonius Rufus, Zeno and others. It aims to provide lessons about personal growth, life management and practicing mindfulness.

The book is intended to be read one page per day with each page featuring a quote from a stoic philosopher along with commentary. It is organized temporally and thematically across the twelve months of the year.

The audiobook version of The Daily Stoic was published by Tim Ferriss.

== Reception ==
The Daily Stoic debuted on the USA Today bestsellers list as well as the Wall Street Journal bestsellers list, where it remained for eleven weeks and ranked as high as #2 overall. The book was also featured in the New York Times, Huffington Post, Business Insider, The Guardian, and by James Romm of the Wall Street Journal.
