= The Process =

The Process may refer to:

- The Process (novel), by Brion Gysin
- The Process (Skinny Puppy album), a 1996 album by industrial band Skinny Puppy
- The Process, a 2000 album by Brave Combo
- The Process (Play-N-Skillz album), a 2005 album by rap group Play-N-Skillz
- The Process (band), an American music group
- The Process (collective), an art and philosophy collective formed in the early 1990s
- The Process Church of The Final Judgment, a religious group that flourished in the 1960s and 1970s
- The Process (Philadelphia 76ers), a reference to the rebuilding phase of the NBA's Philadelphia 76ers in the mid-2010s

== People ==
- Joel Embiid, a Cameroonian basketball player in the NBA, a reference to being part of the 76ers' "Process"

== See also ==
- Process (disambiguation)
- The Trial by Franz Kafka (in German: Der Process)
- Process thinking, a philosophy often referred to as "the process"
- Sam Hinkie
- "Part of the Process", a 1998 song by Morcheeba
