= Project identification =

Part of a project life cycle

Project identification is a process in the initiating phase of project life cycle for identifying a need, problem, or opportunity.

Once identified, a project is initially documented objectively defining what was identified. This identification can be the result of an organization's strategic planning, of a company's normal operations, as the response to an unexpected event, or to a need.
