= Process (disambiguation) =

A process is a set of activities that interact to achieve a result.

Process may also refer to:

- Process (film), 2004
- Process (John Cale album), 2005
- Process (Candy Lo album), 2007
- Process (Sampha album), 2017
- Process (anatomy), a projection or outgrowth of tissue from a larger body
- Process art, an art movement and/or genre.
- Process (computing), an instance of a computer program being executed
- Process (iOS application), non-linear editing photography software for iOS devices

== See also ==
- The Process (disambiguation)
- Process philosophy
- "Part of the Process", a song by Morcheeba
