= One Click =

Book by Richard L. Brandt

One Click: Jeff Bezos and the Rise of Amazon.com
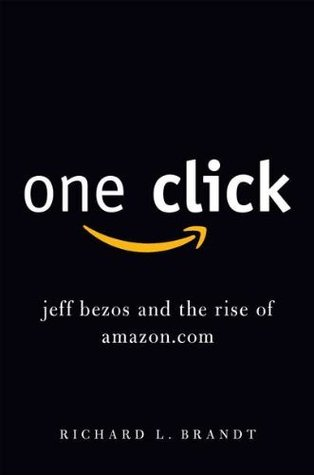
- Cover
- Author: Richard L. Brandt
- Language: English
- Genre: Business
- Publisher: Portfolio
- Pages: 224
- ISBN: 1591843758

One Click: Jeff Bezos and the Rise of Amazon.com is a book by Richard L. Brandt. It profiles the influential role of Amazon CEO and founder, Jeff Bezos, in the company's historic rise from start-up to the market leader of ecommerce.

== Synopsis ==
In One Click, Brandt describes Bezos's upward journey from computer nerd to world-changing technology entrepreneur. In parallel, Brandt also charts Amazon's original market specialization in book sales and the retailer's evolution to selling almost everything, under the mission of making online shopping easy and convenient.
