= Buck O'Neil =

American baseball player and manager (1911–2006)

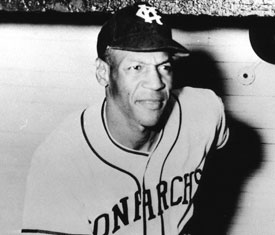
- First baseman / Manager
- Born: November 13, 1911; Carrabelle, Florida, U.S.
- Died: October 6, 2006 (aged 94); Kansas City, Missouri, U.S.
- Batted: Right Threw: Right

Negro leagues debut
- 1937, for the Memphis Red Sox

Last Negro leagues appearance
- 1955, for the Kansas City Monarchs

Negro leagues (Note: On December 16, 2020, Major League Baseball declared the Negro leagues, from the span of 1920–1948, to be a "Major League". O'Neil's statistics reflect his time in the Negro leagues from 1937 to 1948.) statistics
- Batting average: .257
- Home runs: 12
- Runs batted in: 185
- Managerial record (Note: Only games from the 1948 season, the last season the Negro American League was recognized as a Major League, are included.): 69–37–3
- Winning %: .651
- Stats at Baseball Reference
- Managerial record at Baseball Reference

Teams
- As player: Memphis Red Sox (1937); Kansas City Monarchs (1938–1943, 1946–1955); As manager: Kansas City Monarchs (1948–1955)

Career highlights and awards
- 2× All-Star (1942–1943); Negro World Series champion (1942); Chicago Cubs Hall of Fame

Member of the National

Baseball Hall of Fame
- Induction: 2022
- Vote: 81.3%
- Election method: Early Baseball Era Committee

John Jordan "Buck" O'Neil Jr. (November 13, 1911 – October 6, 2006) was an American first baseman and manager in the Negro American League, mostly with the Kansas City Monarchs. After his playing days, he worked as a scout and became the first African American coach in Major League Baseball. In his later years he became a popular and renowned speaker and interview subject, helping to renew widespread interest in the Negro leagues, and played a major role in establishing the Negro Leagues Baseball Museum in Kansas City, Missouri. He was inducted into the Baseball Hall of Fame in 2022 as an executive.

O'Neil was prominently featured in Ken Burns's 1994 documentary series Baseball. His life was documented in Joe Posnanski's 2007 book The Soul of Baseball.

== Early life ==
O'Neil was born in Carrabelle, Florida, to John Jordan O'Neil (1873–1954) and Louella Campbell (maiden; 1884–1945). O'Neil was initially denied the opportunity to attend high school owing to racial segregation. Florida had only four high schools specifically for African Americans. He grew up in Sarasota, Florida in the Newtown community. O'Neil worked the celery fields in Sarasota while his father ran a pool hall in Newtown. He then later moved to Jacksonville with relatives and attended Edward Waters College, where he completed high school and two years of college courses.

== Playing career ==
In 1934, O'Neil left Florida for several years to participate in of semi-professional barnstorming experiences (playing interracial exhibition games). O'Neil signed with the Memphis Red Sox for their first year of play in 1937 in the newly formed Negro American League. His contract was sold to the Monarchs the following year.

O'Neil had a career batting average of .288 between 1937 and 1950, including four .300-plus seasons at the plate, as well as five seasons in which he did not top .260. In 1946, the first baseman led the NAL with a .353 batting average and followed that in 1947 with a .350 mark in 16 games. He also posted averages of .345 in 1940 and .330 in 1949. He played in three East-West All-Star Games in three different seasons and two Negro World Series.

O'Neil's baseball career was interrupted for two years (1944 and 1945) during World War II when he joined the U.S. Navy after the close of the 1943 season. He served his enlistment in a naval construction battalion in New Jersey and as a stevedore in the Mariana Islands and the Philippines. He returned to the Monarchs at the start of the 1946 season.

O'Neil was named manager of the Monarchs in 1948 after Frank Duncan's retirement, and continued to play first base as well as a regular through 1951, dropping to part-time status afterward. He managed the Monarchs for eight seasons from 1948 through 1955 during the declining years of the Negro leagues, winning two league titles and a shared title in which no playoff was held during that period. His two undisputed pennants were won in 1953 and 1955, when the league had shrunk to fewer than six teams.

=== Negro leagues career statistics ===
O'Neil was known to have played full-time in 1951 and as a reserve and pinch-hitter as late as 1955, but Negro leagues statistics for the period 1951 and after are considered unreliable, and rapidly dropping below major league quality.

Year	Team	Age	G	AB	R	H	2B	3B	HR	RBI	SB	BB	BA	OBP	SLG
1937	Memphis	25	9	34	5	10	1	4	0	4	0	0	.294	.294	.559
1938	Kansas City	26	39	127	25	33	7	3	3	19	11	16	.260	.343	.433
1939	Kansas City	27	46	155	19	28	5	4	1	22	3	14	.181	.249	.284
1940	Kansas City	28	31	114	19	35	7	3	1	30	5	6	.307	.342	.447
1941	Kansas City	29	32	129	18	30	5	2	0	11	6	7	.233	.272	.302
1942	Kansas City	30	46	178	27	47	8	1	1	22	4	11	.264	.307	.337
1943	Kansas City	31	39	144	21	42	4	0	1	17	4	8	.292	.333	.340
1944-45	Naval service
1946	Kansas City	34	27	95	14	27	2	2	0	11	1	14	.284	.376	.347
1947	Kansas City	35	36	127	27	34	6	1	2	15	9	13	.268	.340	.378
1948	Kansas City	36	19	69	7	18	1	1	0	10	2	5	.261	.311	.275
1949	Kansas City	37	45	109	17	36	4	0	1	14	6	0	.330	.330	.394
1950	Kansas City	38	31	83	14	21	5	2	1	1	5	11	.253	.340	.398
1951	Kansas City	39	42	134	--	44	--	--	3	26	--	--	.328	~.328	.396
1952	Kansas City	40	--	--	--	--	--	--	--	--	--	--	---	---	---
1953	Kansas City	41	15	21	5	10	0	0	0	1	2	--	.476	~.476	.476
1954	Kansas City	42	--	--	--	--	--	--	--	--	--	--	---	---	---
1955	Kansas City	43	--	--	--	--	--	--	--	--	--	--	---	---	---
Total	12 seasons (through 1950)		400	1364	213	361	55	22	11	176	56	105	.288	.317	.361
	2.469 Seasons; 162-gm avg		162	552	86	146	22	9	4	71	23	43	.288	.317	.361

== Off the field ==
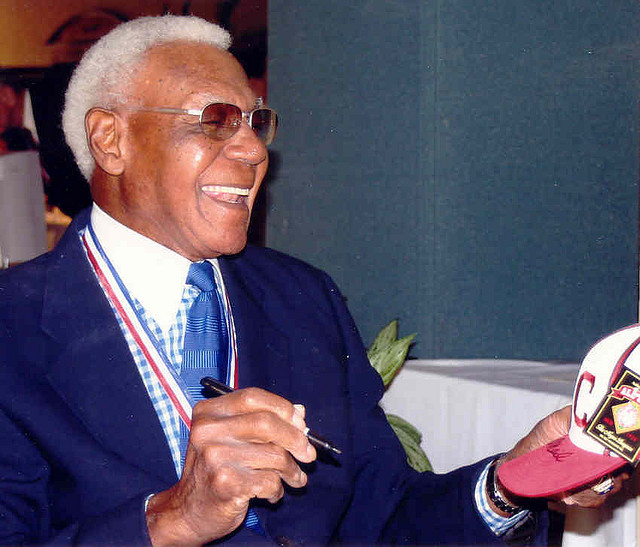
O'Neil signing autographs in 2005

When Tom Baird sold the Monarchs at the end of the 1955 season, O'Neil resigned as manager and became a scout for the Chicago Cubs, and is credited for signing Hall of Fame player Lou Brock to his first professional baseball contract. O'Neil is sometimes incorrectly credited with also having signed Hall of Famer Ernie Banks to his first contract; Banks was originally scouted and signed to the Monarchs by Cool Papa Bell, then manager of the Monarchs' barnstorming B team in 1949. He played briefly for the Monarchs in 1950 and 1953, his play interrupted by Navy duty. O'Neil was Banks' manager during those stints, and Banks was signed to play for the Cubs more than two years before O'Neil joined them as a scout. He was named the first black coach in the major leagues by the Cubs in 1962, although he was not assigned in-game base coaching duties, nor was he included in the Cubs' "College of Coaches" system, and was never allowed to manage the team during that time. After many years with the Cubs, O'Neil became a Kansas City Royals scout in 1988, and was named "Midwest Scout of the Year" in 1998.

O'Neil gained national prominence with his compelling descriptions of the Negro leagues as part of Ken Burns' 1994 PBS documentary on baseball. Afterwards, he became the subject of countless national interviews, including appearances on the Late Show with David Letterman and The Late Late Show with Tom Snyder.

In 1990, O'Neil led the effort to establish the Negro Leagues Baseball Museum (NLBM) in Kansas City, and served as its honorary board chairman until his death. In 1996, O'Neil became the recipient of an Honorary Doctor of Business Administration degree from the University of Missouri – Kansas City in Kansas City, Missouri.

In February 2002, at the end of the NLBM's Legacy Awards annual banquet, O'Neil received an induction ring from the baseball scouts Hall of Fame in St. Louis.

O'Neil and all-star Ichiro Suzuki developed a relationship, with Ichiro attending the Negro Leagues Baseball Museum alongside O'Neil and seeking O'Neil's knowledge of the game when the Seattle Mariners would have road games in Kansas City. "With Buck, I felt something big. The way he carried himself, you can see and tell and feel he loved this game."

== Final year ==
On May 13, 2006, he received an honorary doctorate in education from Missouri Western State University where he also gave the commencement speech.

O'Neil was a member of the 18-member Baseball Hall of Fame Veterans Committee from 1981 to 2000 and played an important role in the induction of six Negro league players from 1995 to 2001 during the time the Hall had a policy of inducting one Negro leaguer per year. O'Neil was nominated to a special Hall ballot for Negro league players, managers, and executives in 2006, but received fewer than the necessary nine votes (out of twelve) to gain admission; however, 17 other Negro league figures were selected.

God's been good to me. They didn't think Buck was good enough to be in the Hall of Fame. That's the way they thought about it and that's the way it is, so we're going to live with that. Now, if I'm a Hall of Famer for you, that's all right with me. Just keep loving old Buck. Don't weep for Buck. No, man, be happy, be thankful.

On July 29, 2006, O'Neil spoke at the induction ceremony for the Negro league players at the Baseball Hall of Fame.

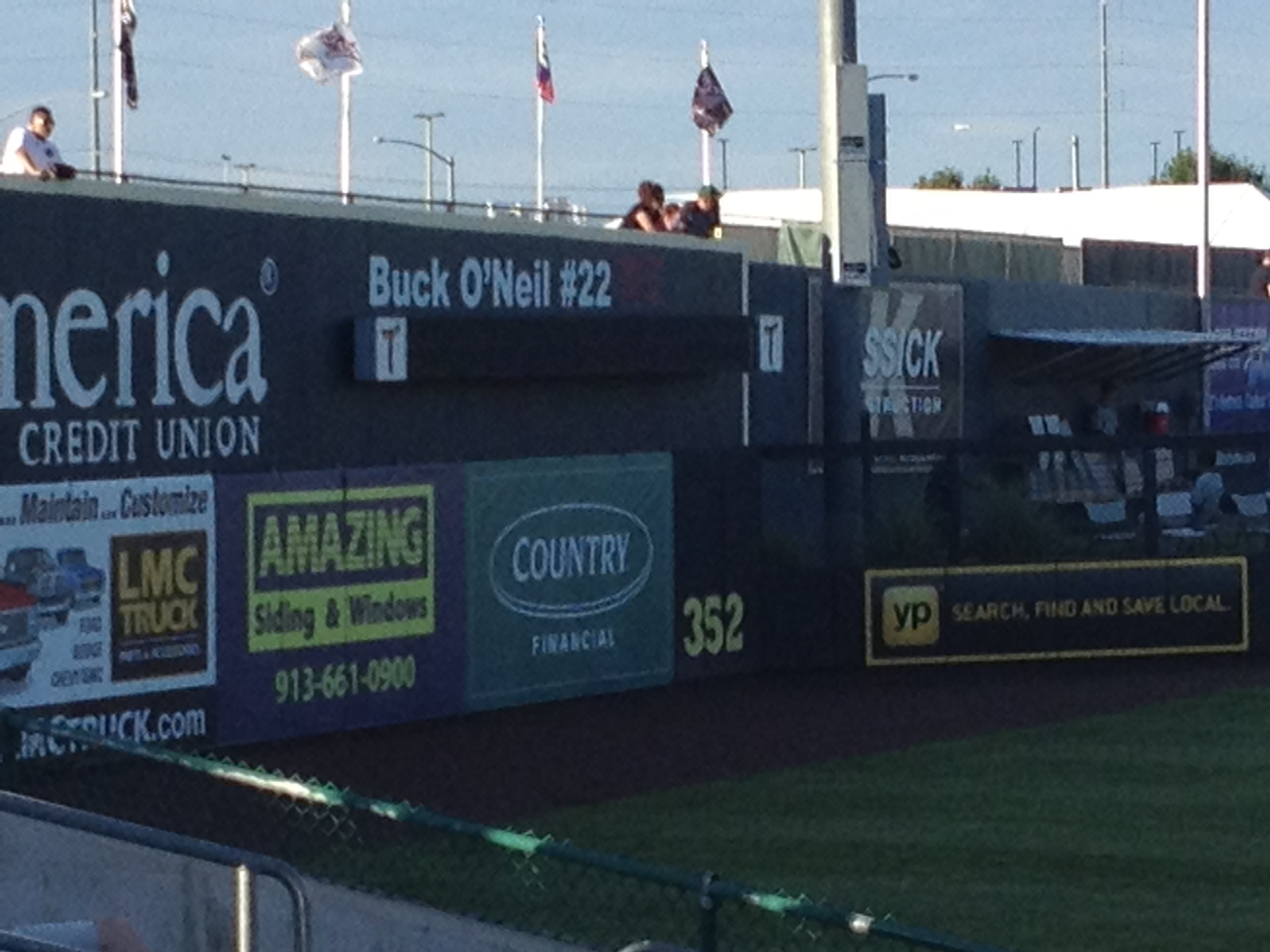
The Kansas City T-Bones retired O'Neil's jersey. The team is now known as The Kansas City Monarchs as a tribute to O'Neil and former Monarchs players.

Just before the Hall of Fame ceremonies, O'Neil signed a contract with the Kansas City T-Bones on July 17 to allow him to play in the Northern League All-Star Game. Before the game, O'Neil was "traded" to the Fargo-Moorhead RedHawks and was listed as the starting shortstop, although after drawing an intentional walk, he was replaced before actually playing in the field. At the end of the inning, another "trade" was announced that brought O'Neil back to the Kansas City team, allowing him to lead off the bottom of the inning as well (drawing another intentional walk).

The T-Bones originally claimed that O'Neil, at age 94 years, 8 months, and 5 days, would be by far the oldest person to appear in a professional baseball game (surpassing 83-year-old Jim Eriotes who had struck out in another Northern League game just a week earlier). However, that claim was in error, as the Schaumburg Flyers of the Northern League had signed Ted "Double Duty" Radcliffe to a one-game contract and allowed him to face one batter on June 19, 1999 when he was 96 years old. While O'Neil was the second-oldest pro player, the claim was amended that he would be the oldest person to make a plate appearance in a professional baseball game.

The Kansas City T-Bones retired his number on May 26, 2006. In 2021, the team rebranded itself as the Kansas City Monarchs as a salute to O'Neill and the historic franchise.

== Death and legacy ==
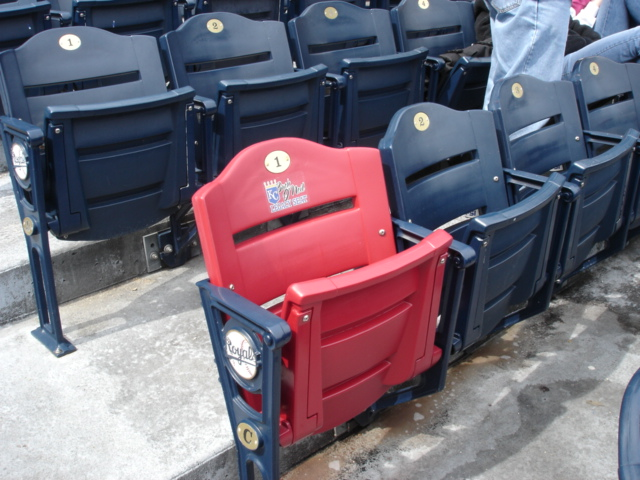
The Buck O'Neil Legacy Seat at Kauffman Stadium

On August 5, 2006, O'Neil was admitted to a Kansas City hospital after complaining that he did not feel well. He was admitted for fatigue and was released three days later only to be re-admitted on September 17. On September 28, Kansas City media reported O'Neil's condition had worsened. On October 6, O'Neil died at the age of 94 due to heart failure and bone marrow cancer.

During the ESPN opening day broadcast of the 2007 Kansas City Royals, on April 2, 2007, Joe Morgan announced the Royals would honor O'Neil by placing a fan in the Buck O'Neil Legacy Seat in Kauffman Stadium each game who best exemplifies O'Neil's spirit. The seat itself has been replaced by a red seat amidst the all-blue seats behind home plate in Section 101, Row C, Seat 1. Due to the renovations and section renumbering in 2009 the seat number is now Section 127, Row C, Seat 9, and the seat bottom is now padded. The first person to sit in "Buck's seat" was Buck O'Neil's brother, Warren G. O'Neil (1917–2013), who also played in the Negro American League.

=== Presidential Medal of Freedom ===
On December 7, 2006, O'Neil was posthumously awarded the Presidential Medal of Freedom by President George W. Bush; the award was presented to his brother, Warren, on his behalf on December 15. He was chosen due to his "excellence and determination both on and off the baseball field", according to the White House news release. He joins other baseball notables such as Roberto Clemente, Joe DiMaggio, Willie Mays, and Jackie Robinson in receiving the United States' highest civilian honor. On November 13, 2012 the family of Buck O'Neil donated his Presidential Medal of Freedom to the Negro Leagues Baseball Museum in honor of what would have been O'Neil's 101st birthday. The medal will be showcased in a special area of the NLBM dedicated to O'Neil.

=== Beacon of Life Award ===
On March 31, 2007—the day of Major League Baseball's first annual Civil Rights Game—O'Neil was posthumously awarded MLB's first annual Beacon of Life Award at the inaugural MLB Beacon Awards luncheon.

=== Lifetime Achievement Award ===
On October 24, 2007, O'Neil was posthumously given a Lifetime Achievement Award named after him. He had fallen short in the Hall of Fame vote in 2006; however, he was honored in 2007 with a new award given by the Hall of Fame, to be named after him.

In 2008 a life size statue of O'Neil was placed on display inside the Negro Leagues Baseball Museum on 18th and Vine in Kansas City, and the Buck O'Neil Lifetime Achievement Award will be presented no more than every three years.

At the Hall of Fame induction ceremony on July 27, 2008, Joe Morgan gave a dedication speech for the award and talked about O'Neil's life, repeatedly citing the title of O'Neil's autobiography, I Was Right on Time.

=== Baseball Hall of Fame ===
On November 5, 2021, O'Neil was selected to the final ballot of 10 candidates for consideration by the Early Days Committee during voting for induction to the Hall of Fame. Candidates needed to receive at least 12 of 16 votes (75%) for election, with the results to be announced in December. On December 5, the Hall of Fame announced that O'Neil and Bud Fowler had been elected, with 13 and 12 votes, respectively.

He was formally enshrined on July 24, 2022, with his niece Angela Terry accepting the nomination and delivering a speech on his behalf.

=== Other honors ===
- Buck O'Neil Run/Walk
- "John Jordan 'Buck' O'Neil" exhibit (in the Ted Williams Museum and Hitters Hall of Fame)
- Shrine of the Eternals: O’Neil was inducted into the Baseball Reliquary's Shrine of the Eternals in 2008.
- Hall of Famous Missourians: In February 2012 O'Neil was inducted to the Hall, located in the Missouri state capitol building in Jefferson City. A bronze bust of O'Neil will be on permanent display by the sculptor E. Spencer Schubert.
- Buck O'Neil Bridge Kansas City, Missouri
- Right on Time Café onboard the USS Kansas City (LCS-22)
- In the Get Fuzzy comic strip, Bucky the Siamese cat is named in honor of O'Neil.
- The Northern Florida chapter of the Society of American Baseball Research is named in honor of O'Neil.

== See also ==
- List of African American firsts
