= The Soul of Baseball =

2007 book by Joe Posnanski

- Author: Posnanski, Joe
- Language: English
- Genre: Non-fiction
- Publisher: HarperCollins
- Publication date: 2007
- Publication place: United States
- Media type: Print (Hardcover)
- Pages: 288
- ISBN: 978-0-06-085403-4
- Dewey Decimal: 796.357

The Soul of Baseball: A Road Trip Through Buck O'Neil's America is a 2007 book written by Joe Posnanski about Buck O'Neil, an American professional baseball player in the Negro leagues during the 1940s and 1950s. O'Neil's contributions to the game of baseball and his love for the sport garnered national attention when he was featured in Ken Burns' 1994 documentary Baseball.

== Book summary ==
Posnanski, a former baseball writer for Sports Illustrated and The Kansas City Star accompanied O'Neil on a 2006 cross-country journey to raise awareness of the Negro leagues. O'Neil, who was in his 90s during the trip, spent much of the time reminiscing with Posnanski about his experiences growing up in a segregated country, being denied the opportunity to attend high school in Florida because he was black, playing in the Negro leagues, and eventually breaking racial barriers in Major League Baseball as both a scout and a coach.

One of O'Neil's greatest achievements was working with the Baseball Hall of Fame to ensure proper recognition of former Negro league players, many of whom were later enshrined as a result of his efforts. O'Neil's own entry was considered by many to be assured, but at the book's end, O'Neil received news that the Hall of Fame decided not to induct him as a member. His inclusion was denied by one vote, a decision that was characterized by one writer as "an act of stupidity and ignorance all of [the] committee members must live with forever."

Soon after hearing the news, and shortly before Posnanski's book was published, O'Neil died at the age of 94.

== Reviews ==
The book was reviewed favorably in many newspapers and websites. Comments included:

"Posnanski masterfully conveys O'Neil's charisma and the rhythm of his words, which often read like free verse. The author trailed his subject as he traversed the country to rekindle interest in the talented players who pushed their way from state to state on rickety buses in an era when Major League Baseball excluded black players. O'Neil's unceasing efforts helped several Negro League stars get inducted into the Baseball Hall of Fame. Despite being a good player, manager and scout in his own right—not to mention a tireless ambassador for the game—he fell one vote shy of election, an injustice decried by his admirers. But O'Neil was not bitter [and] saw goodness in the world despite having been deprived of numerous opportunities because of the color of his skin."

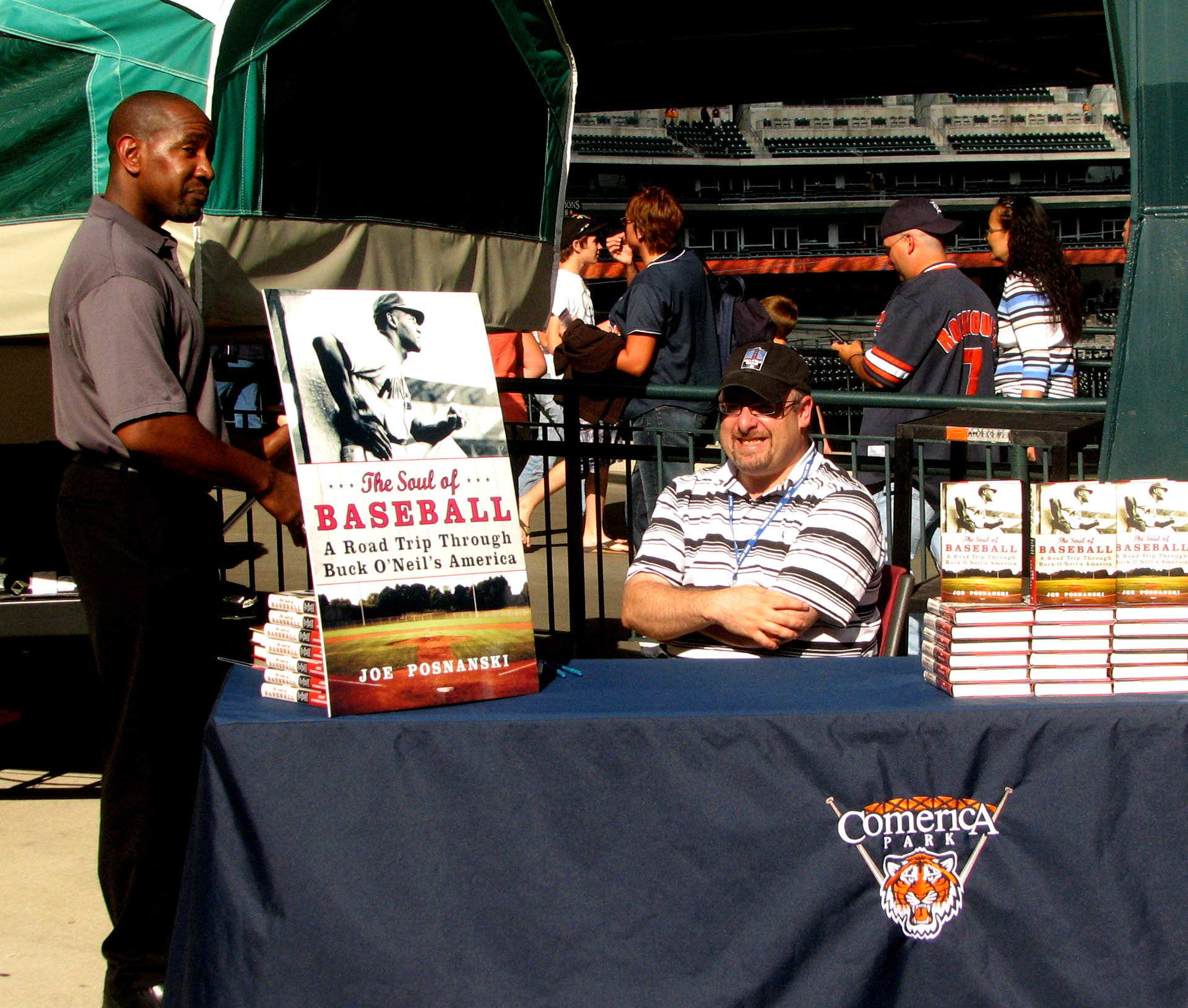
Posnanski at a 2007 Detroit book signing

"A moving elegy for both the Negro Leagues and one of the game's biggest personalities."

"O'Neil was nearly one of the guys who died unknown. But in his final years, he became something of a celebrity after appearing prominently in Ken Burns' baseball series. He died as Posnanski was finishing the book, and it's one of the sadder deaths in all of print. But "The Soul of Baseball" is so warmly told, its stories alternately regretful and hysterical, its lessons too pure and uncynical, that the reader is left not broken, but joyful. After I turned the final page, I simply returned to page 1 and began all over again."

The book won the 2007 Casey Award, an annual award given by Spitball Magazine to the literary world's best baseball book.
