= Bill Snyder Family Football Stadium =

Stadium in Manhattan, Kansas

Bill Snyder Family Stadium Wagner Field

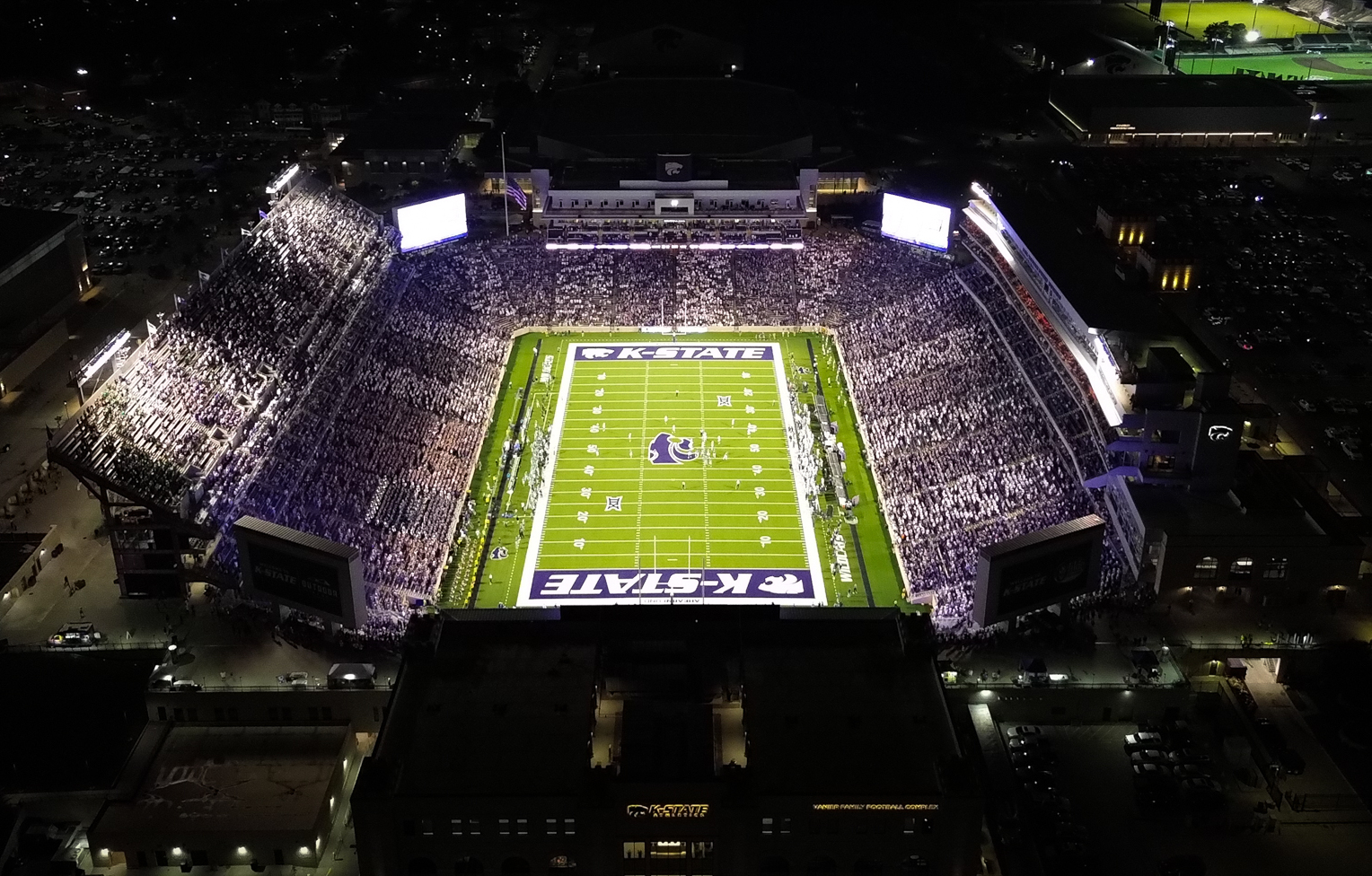
- Aerial view in 2025

- Location in Kansas Location in the United States
- Former names: KSU Stadium (1968–2005)
- Location: 1800 College Avenue; Manhattan, KS 66502-3308
- Coordinates: 39°12′7″N 96°35′38″W
- Owner: Kansas State University
- Operator: Kansas State University
- Capacity: 50,000 (2006–present) Former capacity: List: 50,300 (1999–2005); 43,000 (1970–1998); 35,000 (1968–1969)
- Surface: Matrix Turf with Helix by Hellas
- Record attendance: 53,811

Construction
- Groundbreaking: October 1, 1967
- Opened: September 21, 1968
- Renovated: 1993, 2007, 2012–2017, 2020–2021
- Expanded: 1970, 1999
- Cost: US$1.6 million (original structure) ($14.8 million in 2025 dollars)
- Architects: Wolfenbarger & McCulley (original structure); HOK Sport (renovations)

Tenants
- Kansas State Wildcats (NCAA) (1968–present)

Website
- kstatesports.com/stadium

Bill Snyder Family Stadium is a stadium in Manhattan, Kansas. It is used for American football, and is the home field of the Kansas State Wildcats of the Big 12 Conference. It is named after the family of head coach Bill Snyder. Over the past 31 seasons – from 1990 through the 2022 season – K-State is 169–51–1 (.767) at home.

The stadium has an official seating capacity of 50,000 and is the eighth-largest among current Big 12 members. After new construction in 2013 and 2015, the exterior of two sides of the stadium is clad with limestone, and features towers with decorative limestone battlements – reminiscent of the appearance of the school's old World War I Memorial Stadium.

== History ==
Bill Snyder Family Football Stadium opened as KSU Stadium in 1968, with a seating capacity of 35,000. It was the replacement for the on-campus Memorial Stadium, which hosted Kansas State football games since 1922 (and is still standing today). The first game played at the new stadium was on September 21, 1968 – Kansas State shut out Colorado State 21–0.

In 1970, 4,000 permanent bleacher seats were added to the east side and 3,000 temporary seats on the west side. Also that year, an AstroTurf playing field was installed in place of natural grass.

Over the next two decades, the stadium received only periodic updates. First, the original turf was replaced in 1980 with a product called Superturf, and lights were installed prior to the 1983 season (temporary light standards were brought in for the 1982 game vs. Kansas, which was nationally televised by TBS). In 1988, the south end of the stadium was partially enclosed when the new Bramlage Coliseum was completed. A large reception room inside the coliseum now overlooks the south end of the stadium. Finally, prior to the 1991 season, another new artificial playing surface was installed and the playing field was named Wagner Field for the Dave and Carol Wagner family of Dodge City.

In 1993, on its 25th anniversary, KSU Stadium saw its first significant permanent addition – a five-level press box and luxury suites on the west side of the field, named the Dev Nelson press box. After the 1998 season, the stadium underwent another expansion, a $12.8 million project designed by HOK Sport (now Populous) that added an upper deck on the east grandstands, club seating, and more luxury suites, which increased the official stadium capacity to 50,300. Prior to the 2002 season, the artificial turf was updated to a more cushioned FieldTurf surface at a cost of $800,000.

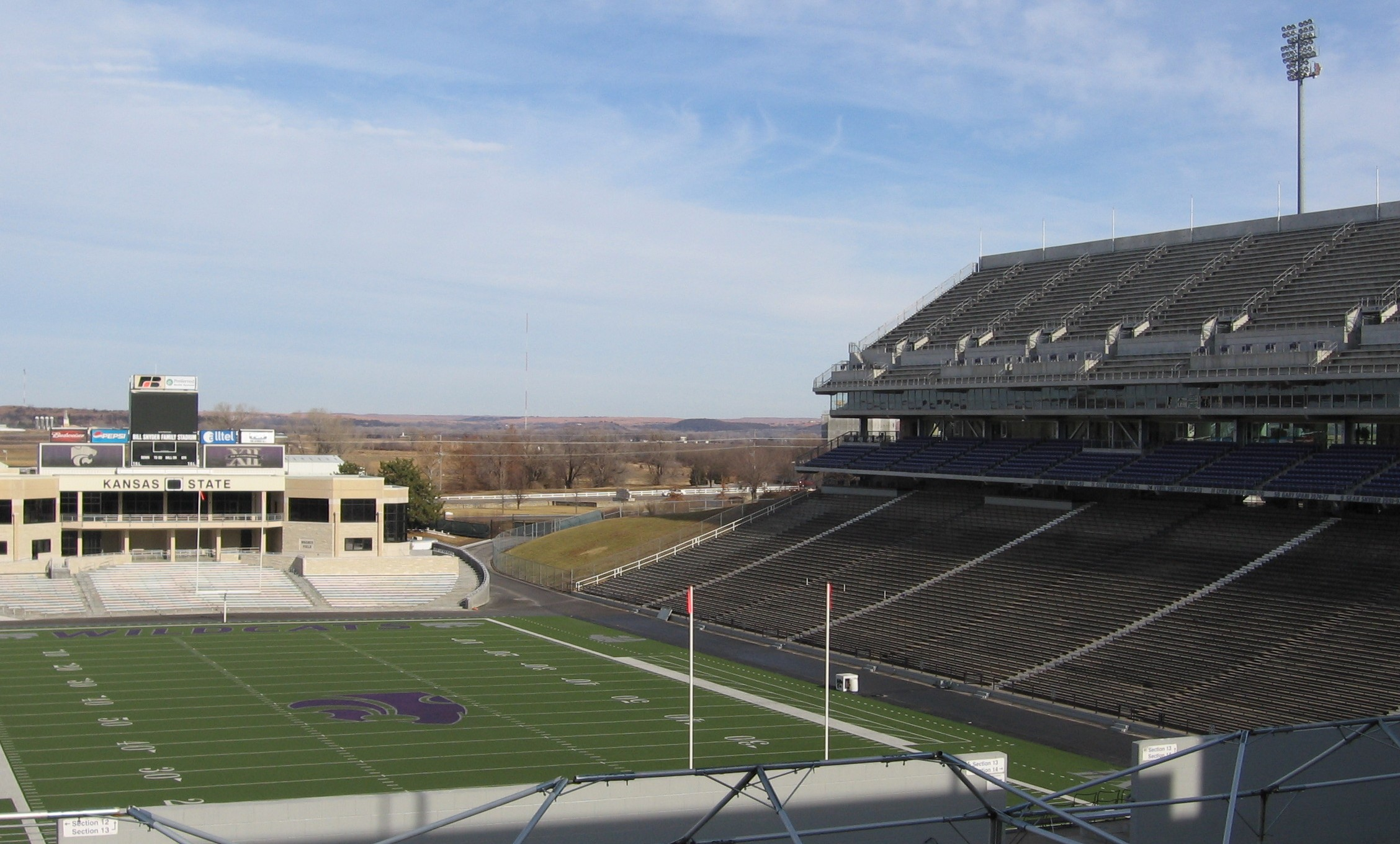
The stadium in 2007

Prior to the 2006 season, another $5.6 million was used to renovate the locker-room complex and add new north end zone seating, reportedly raising the permanent seating capacity by approximately 1,900. The renovation also included new audio and visual electronics and a new hydrotherapy center. Although new permanent seating was added, the athletic department actually lowered the stadium's official seating capacity to 50,000 following the renovation.

After the 2010 season the field was replaced with artificial gameday turf. Additional renovations unveiled for the 2011 season included the addition of concessions and restrooms in the east side upper deck.

The South End Zone received a new structure connected to neighboring Bramlage Coliseum, including expanded premium seating and new fan and concourse amenities. This project began in May 2020 and was completed in time for the 2021 football season.

As of 2022, there are 2 locations within BSFS in which general public ticket holders can purchase alcoholic beverages within the stadium gates. The 'Tailgate Terrace' is an outdoor space part of the West Stadium Center was the first area where general public ticket holders could purchase alcohol. In 2021, a zone called the 'Powercat Porch' was established in the southeast corner of the stadium and became the second public 'beer garden' inside of Bill Snyder Family Stadium and can accommodate 400 fans. Beverages available for purchase include beer, wine, and margaritas.

Before the start of the 2023 season, the surface was replaced by FieldTurf Vertex Prime.

Before the start of the 2025 season, the surface was replaced by Matrix Helix turf system from Hellas.

== Stadium Features ==
=== West Side Stadium Center ===
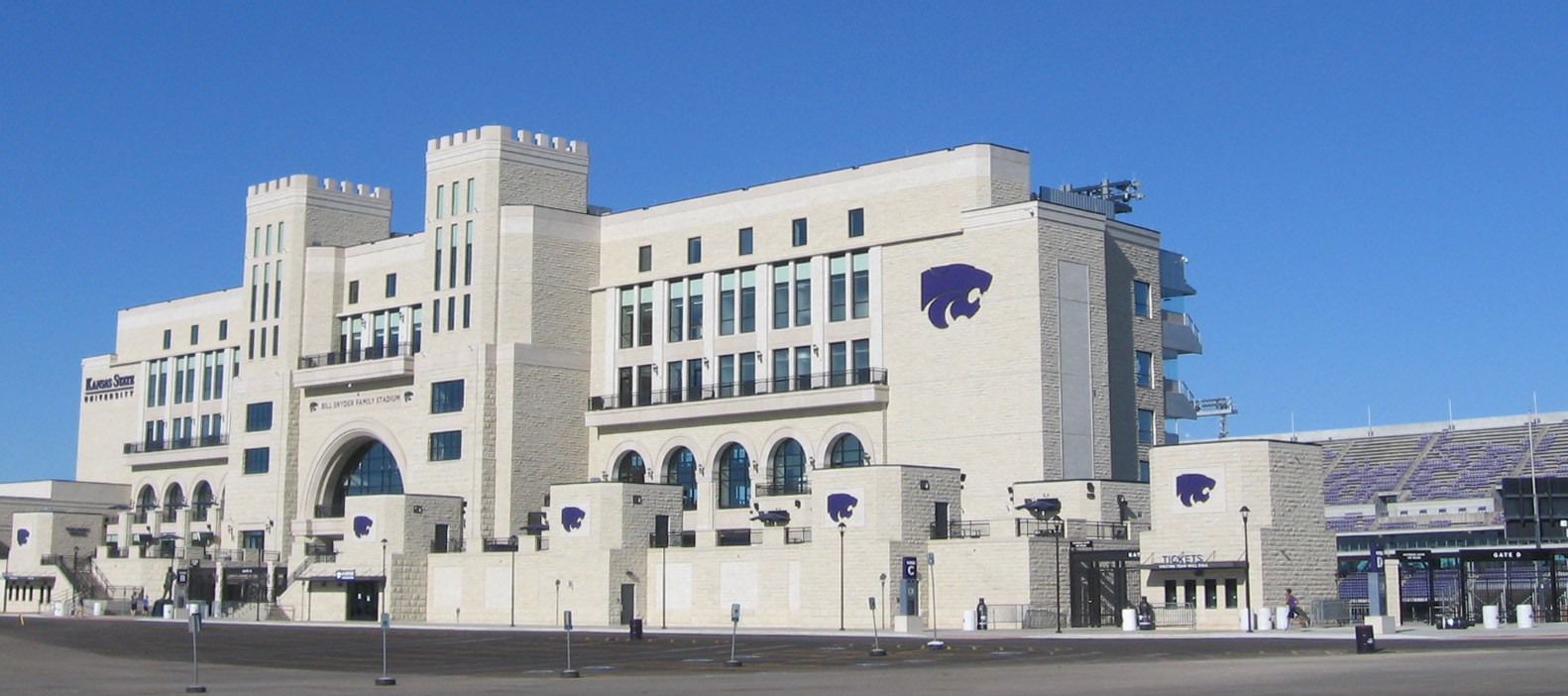
Exterior view and entrance to the stadium

The most significant addition to the stadium since its construction was the West Side Stadium Center, a $90 million project, which opened for the 2013 season.

The project was led by sports design firm AECOM (formerly Ellerbe Becket), out of Kansas City, with design support from Heery Design in conjunction with Construction Managers GE Johnson and Mortenson Construction. K-State broke ground on the project prior to the 2012 Spring Game. Initial construction process took place around the old Dev Nelson press box, and then on December 15, 2012, at 9:00 a.m., the Dev Nelson Press Box was imploded by controlled explosion to make way for the new center.

The approximately 250,000-square-foot (23,000 m^{2}) facility, clad in limestone, provides new amenities for fans and student-athletes. The new structure includes larger concession and restroom facilities, new ticket office and retail locations, a K-State Hall of Honor within the large main concourse, a student-athlete dining hall, new club and loge seats as well as additional premium suites and a new press/media level. An outdoor Tailgate Terrace provides fans a place to enjoy the tailgating atmosphere of a K-State game day. The second through fourth levels have outdoor suite, club and loge seating. The fifth level is designated for media and coaches on game-days and will be the new permanent home for the K-State Media relations office.

The center was officially dedicated on August 30, 2013, in conjunction with the unveiling of an 11 1/2 foot bronze statue of head football coach Bill Snyder in front of the structure. The statue, weighing 1,800 pounds, was created by sculptor E. Spencer Schubert.

=== Vanier Football Complex ===
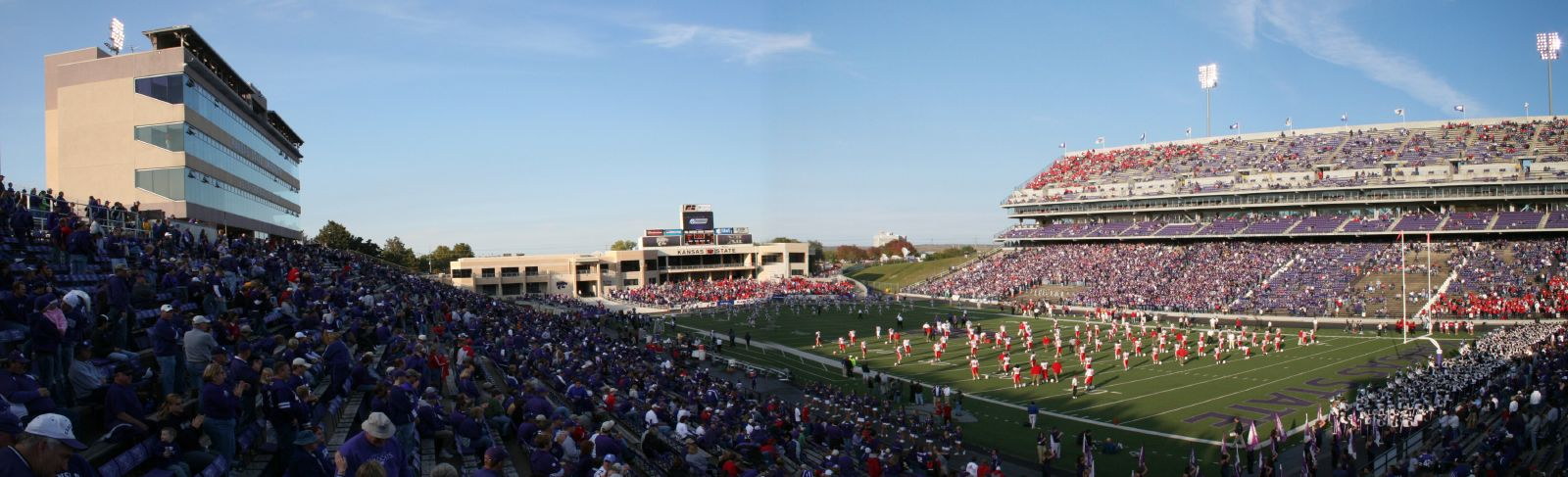
The stadium as it appeared in 2006, with the former Dev Nelson press box on the left, and former Vanier complex at center (both subsequently demolished and replaced)

In 2015, Kansas State opened its new team complex on the north end of the stadium, replacing the previous structure that served as the team's home since 1988. The building is home to all football operational units including staff offices, strength and conditioning, training and recovery, locker rooms, equipment, and even a player lounge with a barber shop. Vanier also provides space for many other arms of the athletic department including the athletic department's administration and the Student-Athlete Enhancement Center, a designated space for K-State student athletes that provides academic and counseling services.

After the 2016 football season more upgrade projects were launched including the installation of new limestone field wall to replace existing metal barriers, updated audio systems, and a new videoboard in the northeast corner of the field to mirror the unit installed the year prior. This project also saw the completion of the 'Northeast Connector' which completed the concourse loop in its entirety and was the first time in the stadiums history. A dedicated seating area was also constructed for the Pride of Wildcat Land Marching Band in the northeast corner of the stadium relocating them from the middle of the student section in Section 26. As of 2022 the band is officially returning to Section 26 in an effort to enhance gameday experience. All of the seating materials for this addition were provided by Hanson Sports, Inc. The expansion joint systems were supplied by EMSEAL Joint Systems, Ltd.

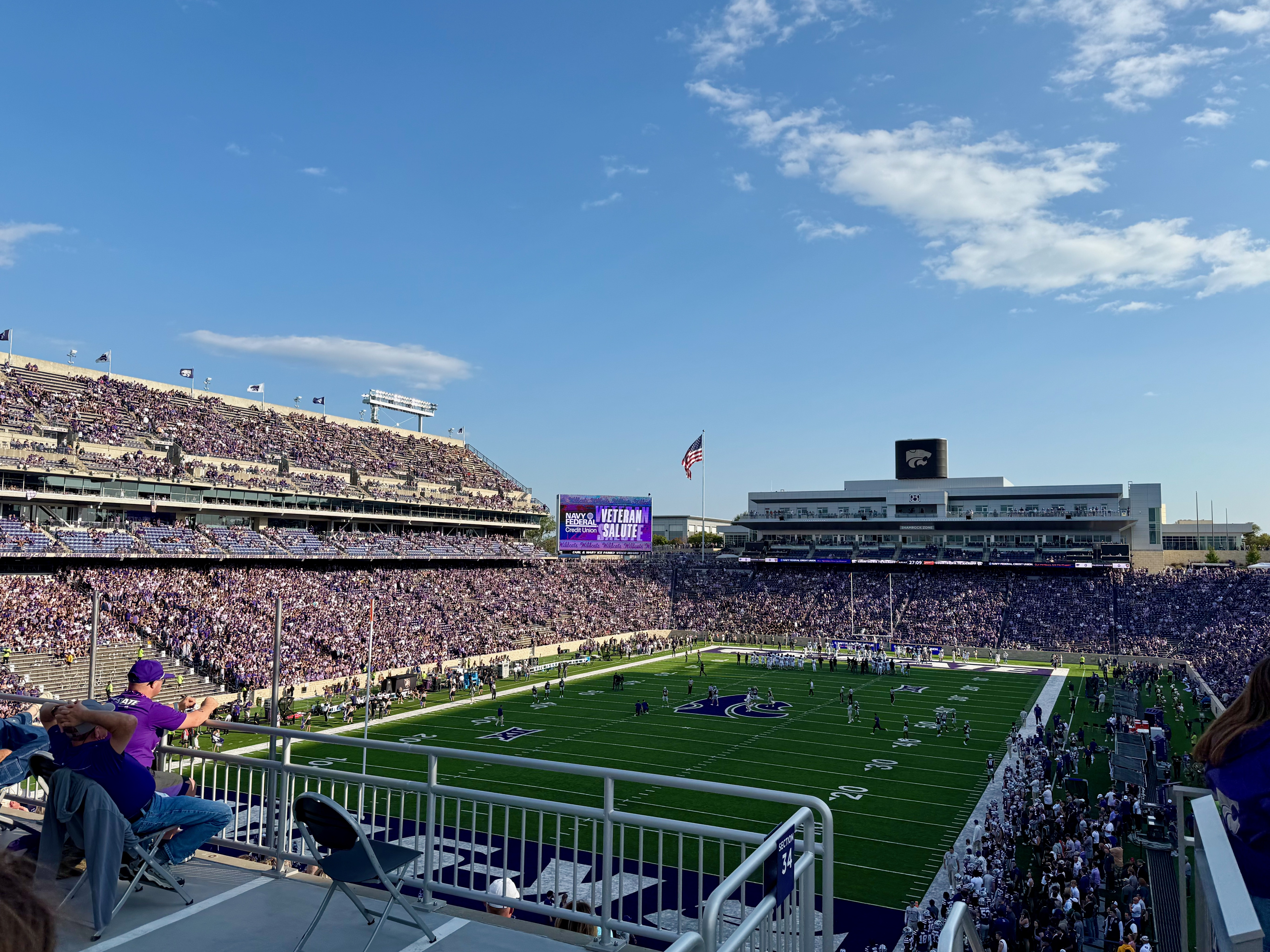
View from the Vanier Complex towards the Shamrock Zone

=== Shamrock Zone ===
In September 2021 K-State unveiled the Shamrock Zone, a 13,500-square-foot club space that offers a unique gameday experience of 318 club seats, 10 loge boxes, and 10 suites that span the south end of Bill Snyder Family Stadium while providing an enhanced lounge area to be utilized for volleyball and men's and women's basketball games.

Other improvements as a part of this project include extending Bramlage Coliseum entrances at the NW and NE points of entry, which adds 4,500 square feet of new concourse to Bramlage, as well as faster access. A new dining terrace has been constructed on the north end of the Bramlage Coliseum arena that will be utilized for upcoming men's and women's basketball seasons. 2 additional videoboards were installed in the southeast and southwest corners of the stadium to match the two installed in 2015 and 2016 respectively, and replaced the singular board that had been the primary video screen for years prior.

The Shamrock Zone was a $50 million project that began in February 2019. Funding for this project was raised through philanthropic gifts by donors and friends of K-State Athletics. No University or state funds were used in the construction of this facility. The project began prior to the COVID pandemic and stayed on budget and on schedule through the pandemic.

=== Renovations and Future Projects ===
A Phased Master Plan initiative was launched in 2011, starting with new Fan Amenities and Turf as Phase I. Phases II and III launched the construction of The West Stadium Center and new Vanier Family Football Complex. This Master Plan was estimated to take 15 years to complete from the completion of Phase I (renovations to the east side's upper deck) in August 2011.

In 2018 K-State replaced its playing surface as it installed AstroTurf's newest product – RootZone Trionic 3D – becoming the first Division I football program in the country to install the product. Additionally, the east side club was renovated.

In September 2019, an updated facilities master plan and fundraising initiative was launched and is ongoing. This plan includes the renovation and construction of new and existing facilities encapsulating all university sponsored sports. Total cost for football improvements is planned to exceed $126.5 million. Funding is being primarily driven by philanthropic gifts. There are no plans to add seating to the stadium at this time.

On December 8, 2021, ground broke for construction of a new Indoor Football Practice Facility which will allow direct access from BSFS and the Vanier Complex. This will include an indoor and outdoor practice field and will also bring improvements to the east concourse and provide space for an Indoor Gameday Fan Zone. Budget is set at $32.5 million and is set to open for use in October 2022. This new practice facility will be in closer proximity to the Vanier Football Family Complex compared to the location of the current indoor football complex which is south of Bramlage Coliseum. The old indoor facility is slated to be repurposed as part of the greater Facilities Master Plan to serve as the new Indoor Track Complex.

== Traditions ==
=== Pregame Show ===
The pregame show features various traditions and is headlined by K-State's Marching Band, "The Pride of Wildcat Land" and features a sequence of traditional band tunes including the schools Alma Mater, Wildcat March, Wabash Cannonball, and Wildcat Victory. This also showcases the spirit squads as well as a dedicated entrance for the school's mascot, Willie Wildcat, who leads the crowd in a K-S-U chant before leading the team onto the field.

=== Gameday Themes ===
Each year, several home games are designated with various themes/promotions to celebrate university traditions and celebrate the identity and brand of K-State University:

==== Fort Riley Day ====
This day celebrates and honors the soldiers and families of nearby Fort Riley. The game hosts hundreds of soldiers and showcases military vehicles and equipment for fans to observe and interact with. Several spectacles have traditionally been implemented including a pre-game flyover in addition to recognitions of deployed and fallen service members throughout the game. Numerous soldiers also join the team mascot in pushups after K-State scores points. K-State Athletics established this community partnership with the base and the 1st Infantry Division "Big Red One" which was originally established in the 2000s. This partnership was officially renewed in 2021 to continue the goal to "mutually support each institution’s unique missions through collaboration and intellectual and cultural sharing."

==== Harley Day ====
An event unique to the college football landscape, Harley Day features a parade of over 100 motorcycles inside the stadium around the field during the pre-game show as the teams enter the stadium before kickoff. The riders are typically led by a bike driven by the school mascot who is outfitted in biker gear. The concept was conceived by then athletics director Max Urick and his assistant Lon Floyd, who thought it would be a way to fire up the gameday crowd. Harley day has been an annual staple since the first ride during the 1998 season.

==== Homecoming ====
Traditionally held toward the end of October, the homecoming game is the capstone to the week of events celebrating Greek and Campus organizations leading up to the game on Saturday.

==== Band Day ====
K-State's marching band hosts the 'All-Star Marching Band' which consists of top high school band students from around the state to perform with the K-State band during pregame and halftime.

==== Ag Day ====
A day that showcases the agricultural heritage of K-State University and recognizes the history, achievements, and reach of K-State agricultural influence.

==== Senior Day ====
A ceremony held during the last home game of the season where the football team's graduating seniors and families are recognized individually on the field. At halftime, members of the marching band and spirit squads are honored before the band's halftime performance.

== Name ==
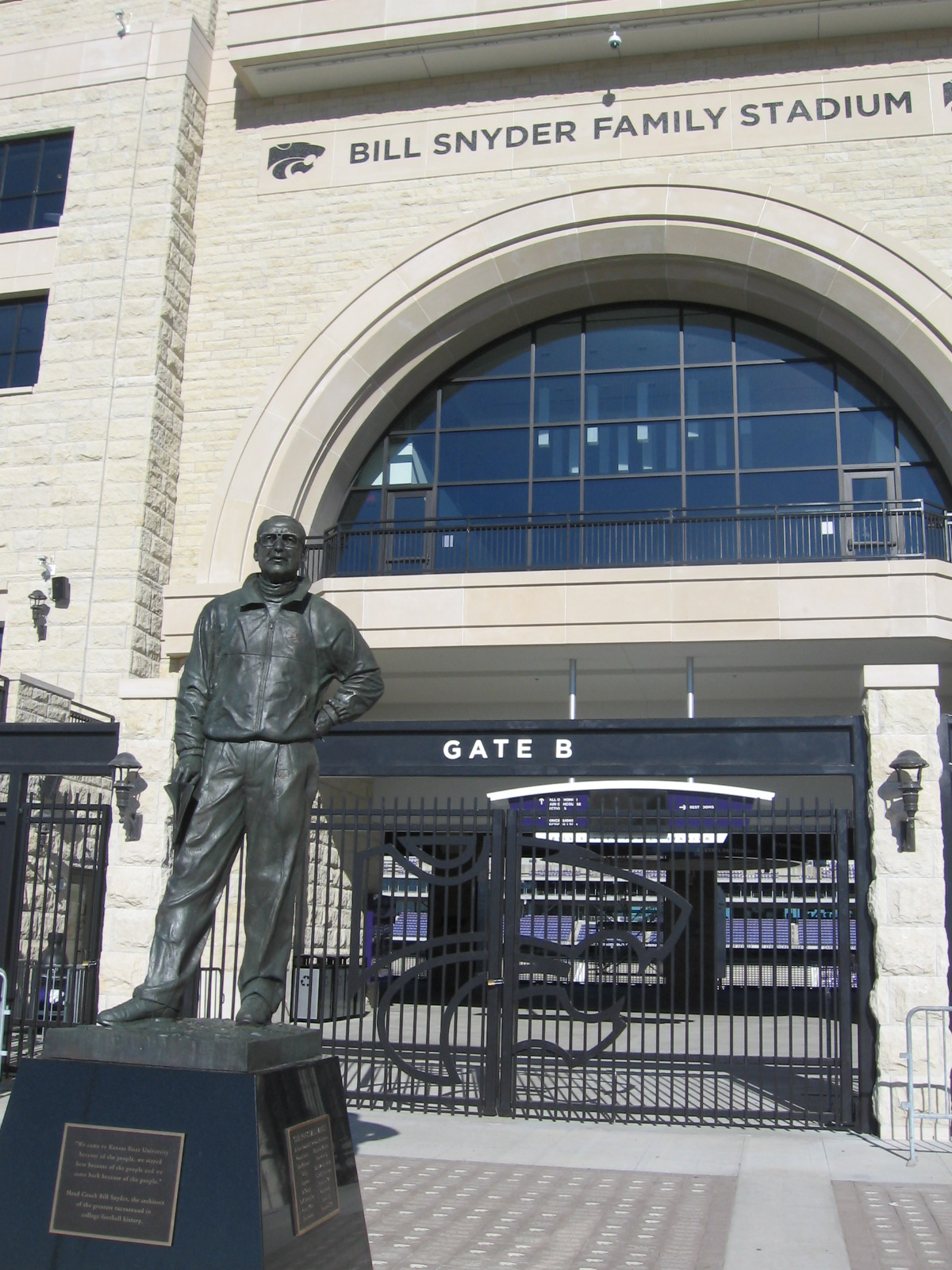
Bill Snyder statue

Before the final game of the 2005 season, Kansas State offered to name the stadium Bill Snyder Stadium in honor of retiring head coach Bill Snyder. In 17 years, Snyder had turned the Wildcats, once the definition of college football futility, into a frequent championship contender in the Big 12 Conference. When asked about renaming the stadium, Snyder told school officials, "If you are going to do it, name it after the people that I care about the most." Hence, the Regents renamed the stadium to honor the family of the coach who had led the team for 17 years.

Starting in the 2009 season, Snyder returned to coach the team again, becoming one of only five coaches in Division I FBS history to coach in a stadium that bears his name, joining Bear Bryant (Alabama), Amos Alonzo Stagg (Chicago), Shug Jordan (Auburn), and LaVell Edwards (BYU).

== Historical Notes ==
- From 1996 to 2000, Kansas State won 26 consecutive games on its home field. This is the 25th-longest home winning streak in NCAA history.
- On August 31, 1996, the stadium hosted the first athletic competition in Big 12 Conference history: a football game between Kansas State and Texas Tech University. Kansas State won the game 21-14 amid pomp and ceremony.
- The first night game at the stadium was held on October 23, 1982, when TBS erected temporary lights to televise a game against the University of Kansas. Kansas State won the game 36–7, in front of a then-record crowd of 43,167.
- Kansas State's 100th game at the stadium was a 21–14 loss to Iowa State University on November 16, 1985.
- Kansas State's 200th game at the stadium was a 40–7 win over Louisiana Tech on November 17, 2001.
- Kansas State's 500th win was 23–0 against University of Texas on October 25, 2014.
- The stadium has hosted several Kansas State High School Activities Association State Championship contests and Kansas Shrine Bowl games.

== Top 10 Crowds at Snyder Stadium ==
Kansas State has exceeded the official capacity at Bill Snyder Family Stadium dozens of times; following are the top 10 crowds:

Highest attendance at Snyder Stadium
Rank	Attendance	Date	Game result
1	53,811	Nov. 11, 2000	#16 Kansas State 29, #4 Nebraska 28
2	53,746	Nov. 1, 2014	#9 Kansas State 48, Oklahoma State 14
3	53,671	Oct. 10, 2015	Kansas State 45, #2 TCU 52
4	53,540	Sep. 19, 2015	Kansas State 39, Louisiana Tech 33, 3OT
5	53,439	Nov. 29, 2014	#12 Kansas State 51, Kansas 13
6	53,351	Aug. 30, 2013*	Kansas State 21, #1 (FCS) N. Dakota State 24
7	53,310	Oct. 16, 2004	Kansas State 21, #2 Oklahoma 31
8	53,297	Sep. 7, 2015#	Kansas State 34, South Dakota 0
9	53,297	Nov. 21, 2015	Kansas State 38, Iowa State 35
10	53,073	Sep. 7, 2013	Kansas State 48, Louisiana-Lafayette 27
*Official opening of West Side Stadium Center
#Official opening of Vanier Football Complex

== Other Events at Bill Snyder Family Stadium ==
The facility has hosted a very small number of non-football activities. On September 5, 1987, Willie Nelson performed a concert at the stadium to raise money for Farm Aid, following a Kansas State football game against Austin Peay State.

On September 10, 2016, Bill Snyder Family Stadium hosted the Wildcat Kickoff which featured Zac Brown Band and Train as the headliners along with Phillip Phillips, David Ray, and Adley Stump.

== See also ==
- List of NCAA Division I FBS football stadiums
- World War I Memorial Stadium – Kansas State football field from 1922 to 1967
- Ahearn Field – Kansas State football field from 1911 to 1921
