= Ego Is the Enemy =

2016 book by Ryan Holiday

- Author: Ryan Holiday
- Language: English
- Subject: Leadership, personal development, business management, ambition
- Genre: Non-fiction, motivational essays
- Publisher: Portfolio, Penguin
- Publication date: June 14, 2016
- Publication place: United States
- Media type: Print (hardcover), ebook
- Pages: 256
- ISBN: 978-1591847816
- OCLC: 922156056
- Dewey Decimal: 158.1
- LC Class: BJ1474.H635 2016
- Preceded by: The Obstacle Is the Way
- Website: egoistheenemy.com

Ego Is the Enemy is the fourth book by author Ryan Holiday, published on June 14, 2016. It is about the "treacherous" nature of ego.

== Background ==
Having previously written about external obstacles in his book The Obstacle Is the Way, Holiday sought to answer questions about what to do when the biggest obstacle is internal. In the prologue of the book, Holiday explains how finding early successes led him to the realization that ego can cloud ambition and hinder personal and professional growth, particularly when accomplishments are tied to self-worth. He writes that this book does not serve to remind the reader to crush their ego in every aspect of his or her life, but rather to use the book as a reminder to make better decisions and eliminate the ego.

Holiday had the title of his book tattooed on his forearm as a daily reminder of its message.

== Synopsis ==
Ego Is the Enemy puts forth the argument that often our biggest problems are not caused by external factors such as other people or circumstances. Instead, our problems stem from our own attitude, selfishness and self-absorption. In other words, introducing ego into a situation often prevents us from being rational, objective and clear headed.

The book does not discuss Freud's ego or egotism as a clinical term but rather ego in a colloquial sense, defined as "an unhealthy belief in your own importance." The book also discusses the difference between ego and confidence, and argues that the solution to the problem of ego is humility, self-awareness, purpose and realism. Ego Is the Enemy provides both cautionary tales as well as positive anecdotes about ego, citing numerous historical and contemporary figures including Christopher McCandless, George Marshall, John DeLorean, Larry Page, Paul Graham, Steve Jobs and William Tecumseh Sherman.

== Reception ==
Ego Is the Enemy has received generally positive reviews, with Outside magazine commenting, "Holiday takes philosophy out of the ivory towers and translates often-dense concepts into actionable insights." The book was featured in the NPR Book Concierge Guide To 2016's Great Reads.

In the weeks after its release, the book was listed by Inc. as one of the must-read business books that summer. The book went on to achieve bestseller status lists by USA Today, Chicago Tribune, and Publishers Weekly.
