= Trust Me, I'm Lying =

2012 book by Ryan Holiday

Trust Me, I'm Lying: Confessions of a Media Manipulator
- First edition (US)
- Author: Ryan Holiday
- Cover artist: Erin Tyler
- Language: English
- Subject: Marketing, Journalism, The Internet
- Genre: Non-fiction
- Publisher: Portfolio (US); Profile Books (UK)
- Publication date: July 19, 2012
- Publication place: United States
- Pages: 288 pages
- ISBN: 978-1591845539
- OCLC: 1021884532
- Dewey Decimal: 659.20285'67532–dc23
- LC Class: HF534.H7416

Trust Me, I'm Lying: Confessions of a Media Manipulator is a book by Ryan Holiday chronicling his time working as a media strategist for clients including Tucker Max, Robert Greene, and Dov Charney.

== Background and description ==
Trust Me, I'm Lying was billed as an exposé of the online journalism system that rose to prominence in the decade before the book's 2012 publication.

Holiday is the former Director of Marketing for American Apparel, where he created controversial campaigns that garnered widespread publicity. Holiday has also done publicity work for Tucker Max, including marketing for the film adaptation of I Hope They Serve Beer in Hell and a media stunt about Max's failed attempt to donate $500,000 to Planned Parenthood.

The book is split into two parts: the first explains why blogs matter, how they drive the news, and how they can be manipulated, while the second shows what happens when this is done, how it backfires, and the consequences of the current media system.

As an example of his argument that blogs shape the news, Holiday outlines how the political blog Politico dedicated significant coverage to the campaign of Tim Pawlenty two years before the 2012 elections in order to generate pageviews for advertisers. Although Pawlenty did not yet have an official campaign, this kickstarted the media cycle which painted Pawlenty as a serious presidential candidate. As an example of the pageview-intensive blogosphere, Holiday uses the example of Jezebel writer Irin Carmon's attack on Jon Stewart and The Daily Show with misleading claims of "The Daily Show's Woman Problem." The book is also the source of a marketing and media concept now referred to as "trading up the chain", in which news is broken on small blogs and passed to successively larger and more influential media outlets.

== Release 6777 ==
In 2011, it was reported that Holiday received a $500,000 advance for a tell-all exposé about these clients and the modern media system from Portfolio, a subsidiary of Penguin Books. However, some outlets later accused the advance of being a strategic marketing stunt engineered by Holiday, which he eventually confirmed as true in a later interview.

Trust Me, I'm Lying debuted on The Wall Street Journal bestseller list. Publishers Weekly stated that "Media students and bloggers would do well to heed Holiday's informative, timely, and provocative advice." Kirkus Reviews called Trust Me, I'm Lying "[a] sharp and disturbing look into the world of online reality."

In anticipation of the book's release, Holiday infiltrated the public relations service Help a Reporter Out and posed as an "expert" on various issues to show that journalists will print statements without fact checking. Holiday made decoy claims to prove the point; some of those were subsequently quoted in articles about subjects ranging from boating upkeep to insomnia to vinyl records in outlets such as The New York Times, MSNBC, and ABC, and the story was profiled in Forbes and Yahoo! News.

In 2013, The Edmonton Journal named Trust Me, I'm Lying one of their "favourite books of the year."
