= Business Insider =

Financial and business news website

- Website type: Financial news website
- Available in: English
- Headquarters: New York City, United States
- Owners: Insider Inc. (Axel Springer SE)
- Creators: Kevin P. Ryan, Henry Blodget
- Editor: Jamie Heller
- Website: www.businessinsider.com
- Commercial: Yes
- Launched: 2007; 19 years ago
- Current status: Active
- OCLC number: 1076392313

Business Insider (stylized in all caps; known from 2021 to 2023 as Insider) is a New York City-based multinational financial and business news website founded in 2007. Since 2015, a majority stake in Business Insider's parent company Insider Inc. has been owned by the German publishing house Axel Springer. It operates several international editions, including one in the United Kingdom.

Business Insider publishes original reporting and aggregates material from other outlets. As of 2011, it maintained a liberal policy on the use of anonymous sources. It has also published native advertising and granted sponsors editorial control of its content. The outlet has been nominated for several awards, but has also been criticized for using factually incorrect clickbait headlines to attract viewership.

In 2015, Axel Springer SE acquired 88% of the stake in Insider Inc. for $343 million (€306 million), implying a total valuation of $442 million. From February 2021 to November 2023, the brand was named simply Insider while it published general news and lifestyle content, before its name was reverted.

In 2023, Business Insider shifted its organizational model, adding multiple artificial intelligence (AI) products in 2024, and reducing its staff by nearly 40% between April 2023 and May 2025.

== History ==
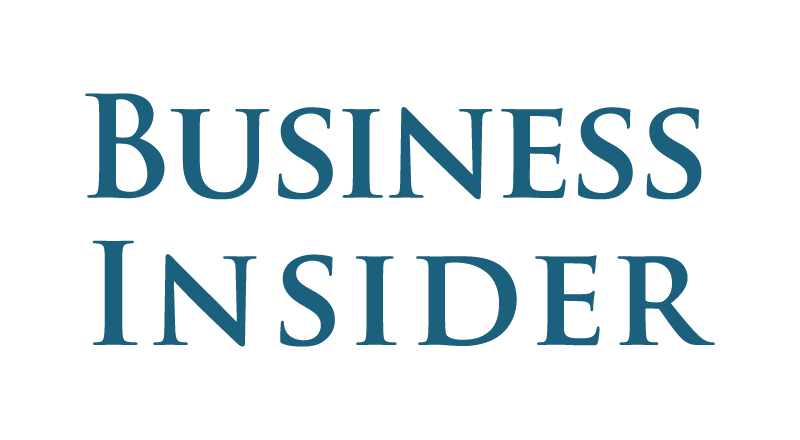
Third logo, used 2011–2017

Fourth logo, used 2017–2021

Fifth logo, used 2021–2023

Business Insider was launched in 2007 and is based in Manhattan. Founded by DoubleClick's former CEO Kevin P. Ryan, Dwight Merriman, and Henry Blodget, the site began as a consolidation of industry vertical blogs, the first of them being Silicon Alley Insider (launched May 16, 2007) and Clusterstock (launched March 20, 2008). Gordon Crovitz, former publisher of the Wall Street Journal, was an early investor. In addition to providing and analyzing business news, the site aggregates news stories on various subjects. It started a UK edition in November 2014, and a Singapore bureau in September 2020. BI's parent company is Insider Inc.

After Axel Springer SE purchased Business Insider in 2015, a substantial portion of its staff left the company. According to a CNN report, some staff who exited complained that "traffic took precedence over enterprise reporting". In 2017, Business Insider launched BI Prime subscription, the service which placed some of its articles behind paywall. In 2018, staff members were asked to sign a confidentiality agreement that included a nondisparagement clause requiring them not to criticize the site during or after their employment.

Early in 2020, CEO Henry Blodget convened a meeting in which he announced plans for the website to acquire 1 million subscribers, 1 billion unique visitors per month, and over 1,000 newsroom employees. The parent companies of Business Insider and eMarketer merged in 2020 in connection with the proposed purchase of Axel Springer by KKR, an American private equity firm. In October 2020, BI's parent company purchased a majority position in Morning Brew, a newsletter.

In 2022, Insider won the Pulitzer Prize for Illustrated Reporting and Commentary, its first ever Pulitzer Prize, for its illustrated report "How I escaped a Chinese internment camp". The piece, composed as a series of comics that told the story of one woman's experience escaping China's persecution of Uyghurs, was created by illustrator Fahmida Azim alongside art director Anthony Del Col, writer Josh Adams, and editor Walt Hickey.

Business Insider laid off 10% of its employees in April 2023. After hiring Jamie Heller, a former Wall Street Journal editor, to serve as its editor-in-chief, in 2024, about 8% of the website's staff were laid off. In May 2025, another 21% of staff were laid off; CEO Barbara Peng stated that the website had launched multiple AI-driven products during the previous year, is "going all-in on AI", and indicated that "significant organizational changes" initiated in 2023 were underway. More than 70% of employees were using Enterprise ChatGPT regularly by May 2025, with 100% being the goal.

== Finances ==
Business Insider first reported a profit in the fourth quarter of 2010. As of 2011, it had 45 full-time employees. Its target audience at the time was limited to "investors and financial professionals". In June 2012, it had 5.4 million unique visitors. As of 2013, Jeff Bezos was a Business Insider investor; his investment company Bezos Expeditions held approximately 3 percent of the company as of its acquisition in 2015.

In 2015, Axel Springer SE acquired 88 percent of the stake in Insider Inc. for $343 million (€306 million), implying a total valuation of $442 million.

== Divisions ==
Business Insider operates a paid division titled BI Intelligence, established in 2013.

In July 2015, Business Insider began the technology website Tech Insider, with a staff of 40 people working primarily from the company's existing New York headquarters, but originally separated from the main Business Insider newsroom. However, Tech Insider was eventually folded into the Business Insider website.

Also in 2015, Business Insider launched Insider Picks, the precursor to what is now Insider Reviews, "to help shoppers navigate the complex retail industry and make the best purchasing decisions."

In October 2016, Business Insider started Markets Insider as a joint venture with Finanzen.net, another Axel Springer company.

== Reception ==
In January 2009, the Clusterstock section appeared in Time's list of 25 best financial blogs, and the Silicon Alley Insider section was listed in PC Magazine's list of its "favorite blogs of 2009". 2009 also saw Business Insider's selection as an official Webby honoree for Best Business Blog. In 2010, Business Insider falsely reported that New York Governor David Paterson was slated to resign; BI had earlier reported a false story alleging that Steve Jobs experienced a heart attack.

In April 2011, Blodget sent out a notice inviting publicists to "contribute directly" to Business Insider. As of September 2011, Business Insider allowed the use of anonymous sources "at any time for any reason", a practice which many media outlets prefer to avoid or at least indicate why a source is not identified. According to the World Association of Newspapers and News Publishers, Business Insider gave SAP "limited editorial control" over the content of its "Future of Business" section as of 2013. The website publishes a mix of original reporting and aggregation of other outlets' content. Business Insider has also published native advertising.

In January 2014, The New York Times reported that Business Insider's web traffic was comparable to that of The Wall Street Journal. In 2017, Digiday included imprint Insider as a candidate in two separate categories—"Best New Vertical" and "Best Use of Instagram"—at their annual Publishing Awards.

The website faced criticism for what had been perceived as clickbait-style headlines. A 2013 profile of Blodget and Business Insider in The New Yorker suggested that Business Insider, because it republishes material from other outlets, may not always be accurate. Glenn Greenwald also critiqued the reliability of Business Insider, alongside that of publications including The Wall Street Journal, Yahoo! News, and Slate.

In 2022, Insider won the Pulitzer Prize for Illustrated Reporting and Commentary for its reporting on the persecution of Uyghurs in China.

In 2025, Jacob Furedi, the former deputy editor of UnHerd and the editor of Dispatch, investigated articles on Business Insider and Wired purportedly written by freelancer "Margaux Blanchard". After he concluded the articles were AI-generated, he contacted Press Gazette and the two outlets subsequently removed the articles. The Washington Post reported in September 2025 that the AI-fakes were part of a broader scheme amidst Business Insider's deletion of 19 author pages and the removal of 40 articles written by individuals other than Blanchard.

== Works cited ==
- Holiday, Ryan (2012). Trust Me, I'm Lying: Confessions of a Media Manipulator. Penguin Books. ISBN 978-1101583715.
