= Process thinking =

Step-by-step analysis

Process thinking, also known as "the process", is a philosophy that emphasizes preparation and hard work over consideration of outcomes or results, and is particularly popular in professional sports. Practitioners of process thinking focus on the present instead of past events or future outcomes, and believe that all actions one takes in life, regardless of how trivial they may seem, affect the desired outcome. The philosophy was popularized by American football coach Nick Saban.

== History ==
The step-by-step mechanism of process thinking is a prominent part of cognitive behavioral thinking, which was developed by psychiatrist Aaron Beck. In the 1960s, Beck developed a therapy which relies on the idea that thoughts affect feelings, and that good mental habits are systematically built up one step at a time.

== Use in coaching ==
Don't think about winning the SEC Championship. Don't think about the national championship. Think about what you needed to do in this drill, on this play, in this moment. That's the process: Let's think about what we can do today, the task at hand.

— Nick Saban

Nick Saban formulated process thinking as it pertains to American football with the help of psychiatry professor Lionel Rosen while Saban was the head coach at Michigan State University. Saban and Rosen broke down complicated tasks like football games—and entire seasons—down into smaller, more manageable pieces. Rosen emphasized that the average football play lasts only seven seconds so coaches and players should concentrate only on those seconds, take a rest between plays, then do it all over again.

During his time with LSU, the Miami Dolphins, and later the University of Alabama, Saban refined this systematic approach and extended it to include all aspects of managing a football program, which he calls "the process." A key element of Saban's process, often stylized "The Process", is clearly defined expectations for his players not only on the field, but also academically and personally (including a dress code), which are monitored year-round.

Nick Saban's Process featured in Ryan Holiday's The Obstacle Is the Way, where it drew comparisons to Stoic philosophy.

Saban has led his teams to numerous conference championships and seven national championships, six of them with Alabama and one with LSU. Much of the credit for Saban's sustained success has been given to the Process.

Other coaches, players and general managers such as Head Coach of the Chicago Bears John Fox, Texas A&M Aggies Football coach Jimbo Fisher and University of Texas head basketball coach Shaka Smart have also asked their teams to “follow the process.”

== Prominent practitioners ==
- Sam Hinkie
- Nick Saban
- Bill Belichick
- Steve Sarkisian
- John Fox
- Jimbo Fisher
- Jim McElwain
- Shaka Smart
- Matt Campbell

== See also ==
- Aaron T. Beck
- Cognitive behavioral therapy
- Stoicism
