= The Obstacle Is the Way =

2014 book by Ryan Holiday

The Obstacle Is the Way: The Timeless Art of Turning Trials into Triumph
- First edition (US)
- Author: Ryan Holiday
- Cover artist: Erin Tyler
- Language: English
- Publisher: Portfolio (US); Profile Books (UK)
- Publication date: May 1, 2014
- Publication place: United States
- Pages: 224 pages
- ISBN: 1591846358

The Obstacle Is the Way: The Timeless Art of Turning Trials into Triumph is the third book by author Ryan Holiday. It was published in 2014. Holiday offers individuals a framework to "flip obstacles into opportunities". It was inspired by the philosophy of stoicism.

== Overview ==
The title of the book is drawn from a quote from Meditations by Roman emperor Marcus Aurelius: “The impediment to action advances action. What stands in the way becomes the way.” Holiday draws from Meditations and the philosophy of Stoicism to expand the central theme of the book, which is that how we respond to obstacles is what defines us. Holiday argues that if an individual learns the framework to flip obstacles into success, he or she can be better for it.

The framework that Holiday offers is composed of three disciplines: perception, action and will. As he explains this, Holiday supplements each section with historical anecdotes and figures from politics, commerce, sports, and history.

== Preface ==
In the preface, Holiday begins by setting the scene in the year of 170 in Germania, as Emperor Marcus Aurelius wrote down the formula for getting through rough situations. Holiday emphasizes that Aurelius' formula was a "formula for thriving not just in spite of whatever happens but because of it."

Holiday notes that the book will study how individuals took their struggles, flipped them around and enhanced a virtue or skillset. He issues a call to action to the reader, to join the band of individuals that have challenged themselves to better themselves through the obstacles they've faced.

== Introduction ==
Holiday begins with a story of a king with a kingdom of people who had grown slightly entitled. To change this, the king placed a large boulder in the middle of the main road, blocking entry to the city. He watched as many of the kingdom's people tried to go on the road. Most ended up either looking at it and leaving or put in minimal effort before giving up. After a few days, a peasant came to the town. Like the citizens of the town, he first tried to move the rock out the way. After realizing the boulder was too massive, he then went into the forest, grabbed a branch which he used as a lever, and was able to move the rock. Afterwards, he discovered that underneath was a purse of gold coins and a note from the King which said "The Obstacle in the Path becomes the path. Never forget, within every obstacle is an opportunity to improve our condition."

== Part 1: Perception ==
Holiday argues that an individual's perspective impacts his or her success. Holiday takes the Stoic point of view, stating that an objective mind, which can "resist temptation or excitement, no matter how seductive, no matter the situation" can succeed. He mentions the example of Rockefeller, who stayed grounded by understanding the turbulence of the market and only investing when he deemed it was fit. This allowed his business to flourish throughout multiple economic crises.

Holiday argues the impact of the physical evolutionary mind in the advanced world we live in is a result of our primal mechanisms messing us over. Holiday argues that we can combat the primal responses that cause us to act irrationally by cultivating discipline in perception.

Holiday emphasizes two major skills to have during these challenging times: grace and poise. Holiday explains that when stress comes, it triggers the human, primal, senseless reactions. Grace and poise allow individuals to keep a cool head and "deploy other skill'" which can help solve the problem.

Holiday includes a quote from the Gift of Fear, where author Gavin de Becker writes, "When you worry, ask yourself 'What am I choosing to not see right now?' What important things are you missing because you chose worry over introspection, alertness or wisdom?" The key point Holiday emphasizes here is that unhelpful emotions can be deconstructed, using logic which helps us figure out root causes and helps keep us grounded

Holiday encourages the reader to stop being judgmental and take on life with an objective lens. Holiday divides perspective into two definitions: context and framing. Context is how individuals see the specific situation or obstacle amidst the world, their lives and a bigger picture. Framing is how individuals personally evaluate and make sense of the situations they are presented with.

Holiday lists things that are under an individual's control which include: emotions, judgements, creativity, attitude, perspective, desires, decisions and determination. In the next chapter, he provides a list of businesses that began amidst economic depressions. He argues that the individuals who founded the businesses were able to succeed because they weren't focused on the situation or context at which they were starting their business, but rather the products that they were trying to sell and had strong faith in. Holiday later uses the example of Steve Jobs to drive home the idea that our perception of our capabilities shapes what we end up accomplishing.

Holiday talks about how transformative it is to be able to understand that the worst thing to occur is for us to be faced with an obstacle and lose our composure. He argues that by not remaining mentally composed, we make the problem larger and heavier upon ourselves.

== Part II ==
In the preface of part II, Holiday discusses how individuals need to take action that is intentional and not just aimless. He discusses the value of action, specifically, "directed action" and writes that action is able to "dismantle the obstacles in front of us."

Holiday discusses how Amelia Earhart was given the opportunity to fly a plane. He focuses on the fact that when Earhart was offered this, it wasn't presented exactly as the opportunity but rather she was told that she was second choice (the first choice had backed out), and that while the men that were on the flight with her would receive compensation, Earhart would not receive anything. Holiday doesn't use this example to encourage individuals to settle, but rather he argues that individuals with firm faith in themselves jump at the opportunity to start more than anything. This was an opportunity for Earhart to fly a plane and thus she took it. Holiday argues that many times we wait for the conditions to be the way we want them and for the situation to go our way before we act.

Holiday discusses how in Silicon Valley, start-ups don't release a finalized product but rather a "minimum viable product". Holiday says the reason behind this method is to see the consumer demand and response and avoid launching a product that is unwanted by consumers. He writes, "Failure really can be an asset if what you're trying to do is improve, learn or do something new."

Holiday discusses how the process is about making tasks manageable and looking at the big picture. Instead of focusing too heavily on the overall goal we should focus on the task in front of us.

== Reception ==
The book has sold over 100,000 copies since its release and been translated into 17 languages. After the book's release, the book slowly made its way through the community of professional sports, and are being read by a number of prominent athletes and head coaches including Joe Maddon of the Chicago Cubs, Marquette basketball coach Shaka Smart, tennis pro James McGee, NFL lineman Garrett Gilkey, Olympic gold medalist Chandra Crawford, and others. On the way to their 2014 Super Bowl victory, Michael Lombardi and Bill Belichick of the New England Patriots distributed copies of The Obstacle Is the Way to their staff and players. In the 2015 season, Seattle Seahawks GM John Schneider and Pete Carroll passed the book around the team's locker room.
