= Joe Posnanski =

American sportswriter

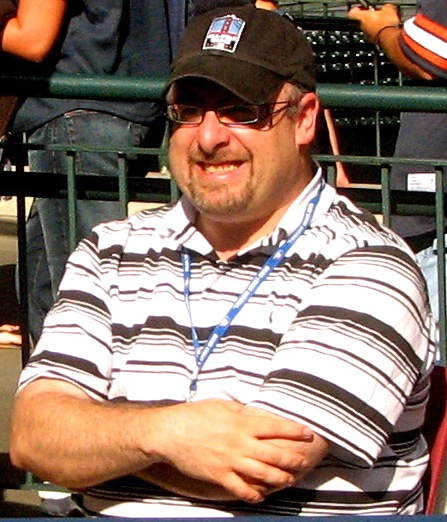
- Posnanski in 2007
- Born: January 8, 1967 (age 59); Cleveland, Ohio, U.S.
- Occupations: Sports columnist Author
- Spouse: Margo
- Children: Elizabeth, Katie
- Website: joeposnanski.com

Joe Posnanski (/pəzˈnænski/) (born January 8, 1967), nicknamed "Poz" and "Joe Po", is an American sports journalist. A former senior columnist for Sports Illustrated (where he wrote a blog called "Curiously Long Posts") and columnist for The Kansas City Star, he currently writes for his personal blog JoeBlogs.

== Early life ==
Posnanski grew up in South Euclid, Ohio, and moved to Charlotte, North Carolina, during high school. He studied accounting, but switched his major to English at the University of North Carolina at Charlotte.

== Journalism ==
Posnanski began his journalism career as a multi-use reporter and an editor at The Charlotte Observer. He worked as a columnist at The Cincinnati Post, The Augusta Chronicle, and The Kansas City Star. He was a senior writer for Sports Illustrated until April 2012 when he announced that he would work for Sports on Earth, a new internet joint venture between USA Today and Major League Baseball Advanced Media. His first column for Sports on Earth was published on August 26, 2012. In February 2013, he became the national columnist for NBC Sports. In February 2017, he became a national columnist for MLB.com and contributor on the MLB Network.

A selection of his columns about the magic of sports is compiled in the book The Good Stuff. His book The Soul of Baseball: A Road Trip Through Buck O'Neil's America was published by William Morrow & Company and won the CASEY Award as best baseball book of 2007. MLB.com included the book in its list of the "Best baseball books of all time" in 2021.

Another book, about the Big Red Machine, titled The Machine: A Hot Team, a Legendary Season, and a Heart-stopping World Series: The Story of the 1975 Cincinnati Reds, was published in 2009 and reached Number 17 on the New York Times Bestseller List. Posnanski wrote a biography of longtime Penn State football coach Joe Paterno for Simon & Schuster, which was released on August 21, 2012 and debuted at Number 1 on the New York Times Bestseller List. Posnanski's fourth book, The Secret of Golf, details the longstanding rivalry and friendship of golfers Tom Watson and Jack Nicklaus. His book The Life and Afterlife of Harry Houdini was released on October 22, 2019. His latest book was The Baseball 100 was released on September 28,2021. In October 2007, he debuted his website at joeposnanski.com, later converted to a blog and titled Joe Blog. In 2011, his blog post on The Promise was named one of "Nearly 100 Fantastic Pieces of Journalism" by The Atlantic. The blog was nominated for a National Magazine Award.

== Journalism awards ==
In 2002 and 2005, Posnanski was named the best sports columnist in America by the Associated Press Sports Editors. In all, he has been nominated 26 times for APSE Awards, and he also has won in the features and projects categories. In 2009, he won the National Headliners Award for sports column writing, and he won back-to-back National Headliners Awards in 2011 and 2012 for Online Writing. In January 2012, the National Sportscasters and Sportswriters Association (NSSA) named Posnanski National Sportswriter of the Year. In 2014 and 2016, he won Sports Emmy Awards as part of NBC's Olympic coverage.

Posnanski has won many other awards, including the Missouri Press Association award for best sports columnist in Missouri ten times, and he was the first recipient of the Joe McGuff journalism award, presented by the Greater Kansas City Sports Commission. In 2011, the Baseball Bloggers Alliance named Posnanski the inaugural winner of their online writer of the year award. The BBA also announced that they will rename the award "The Joe Posnanski Award." At the Blogs With Balls 4 conference, he won best sportswriter in the first Untitled Sports Media Award Project (USMAP).

The National Polish-American Sports Hall of Fame held its 48th Annual Induction Banquet in September 2021, inducting Bronko Nagurski, J.R. Cielski, A.J. Pierzynski and Mike Krukow. Joe Posnanski was honored with the Tony Kubek Media Award.

== Miscellaneous ==
He is on the 10-person voting panel for the Fielding Bible Awards, an alternative to the Gold Glove Award in Major League Baseball.

The PosCast is a weekly podcast on the Le Batard and Friends podcast network hosted by Posnanski and is co-hosted by Michael Schur. The podcast primarily discusses baseball but meanders into other sports, subjects, drafts of random items, and prides itself in being nonsensical. The podcast has featured notable guests and co-hosts such as Linda Holmes, Ken Rosenthal, Nick Offerman, Ellen Adair, Stefan Fatsis, Brandon McCarthy, Joey Votto, and Sean Doolittle.

In 2026, Posnanski also launched a baseball-specific podcast titled The Joy of Baseball, co-hosted by sports journalist Molly Knight. Early guests on the show included Jason Benetti, Sarah Langs, and Ken Burns.

== Personal life ==
He and his wife Margo live in Charlotte, North Carolina. They have two daughters.

== Filmography ==
Posnanski has appeared on several television programs and documentaries.

Year	Title	Credited as	Notes
2022	Facing Nolan	Himself	documentary film
2022	The Jackie Stiles Story	Himself	documentary film
2021	If You Build It: 30 Years of Field of Dreams	Himself	documentary film
2021	Rulon Gardner Won't Die	Himself	documentary film
2020	Curious Life and Death of...	Himself	season 1, episode 5
2016	Fastball	Himself	documentary film
2014	Happy Valley	Himself	documentary film
2013	A Football Life	Himself	season 3, episode 16
2012	NFL Top 10	Himself	season 5, episode 12
2011	NFL Top 10	Himself	season 6, episode 1
2006	Countdown with Keith Olbermann	Himself	
2006	ESPN Outside the Lines Nightly	Himself	

== Bibliography ==
- The Good Stuff: Columns about the Magic of Sports (2001)
- The Soul of Baseball: A Road Trip Through Buck O'Neil's America (2007)
- The Machine: A Hot Team, a Legendary Season, and a Heart-stopping World Series: The Story of the 1975 Cincinnati Reds (2009)
- Paterno (2012)
- The Secret of Golf: The Story of Tom Watson and Jack Nicklaus (2015)
- The Life and Afterlife of Harry Houdini (2019)
- The Baseball 100 (2021)
- Why We Love Baseball: A History in 50 Moments (2023)
- Why We Love Football: A History in 100 Moments (2024)
- Big Fan (2026)
