= Process =

Series of activities

A process is a series or set of activities that interact to produce a result; it may occur once-only or be recurrent or periodic.

Things called a process include:

== Business and management ==
- Business process, activities that produce a specific service or product for customers
- Business process modeling, activity of representing processes of an enterprise in order to deliver improvements
- Manufacturing process management, a collection of technologies and methods used to define how products are to be manufactured.
- Process architecture, structural design of processes, applies to fields such as computers, business processes, logistics, project management
- Process area, related processes within an area which together satisfies an important goal for improvements within that area
- Process costing, a cost allocation procedure of managerial accounting
- Process management (project management), a systematic series of activities directed towards planning, monitoring the performance and causing an end result in engineering activities, business process, manufacturing processes or project management
- Process-based management, is a management approach that views a business as a collection of processes

== Law ==
- Due process, the concept that governments must respect the rule of law
- Legal process, the proceedings and records of a legal case
- Service of process, the procedure of giving official notice of a legal proceeding

== Science and technology ==
- The general concept of the scientific process, see scientific method
- Process theory, the scientific study of processes
- Industrial processes, consists of the purposeful sequencing of tasks that combine resources to produce a desired output

=== Biology and psychology ===
- Process (anatomy), a projection or outgrowth of tissue from a larger body
- Biological process, a process of a living organism
- Cognitive process, such as attention, memory, language use, reasoning, and problem solving
- Mental process, a function or processes of the mind
- Neuronal process, also neurite, a projection from the cell body of a neuron

=== Chemistry ===
- Chemical process, a method or means of changing one or more chemicals or chemical compounds
- Unit process, a step in manufacturing in which chemical reaction takes place

=== Computing ===
- Process (computing), a computer program, or running a program concurrently with other programs
  - Child process, created by another process
  - Parent process
- Process management (computing), an integral part of any modern-day operating system (OS)
- Processing, an open-source programming language and integrated development environment

=== Mathematics ===
- In probability theory:
  - Branching process, a Markov process that models a population
  - Diffusion process, a solution to a stochastic differential equation
  - Empirical process, a stochastic process that describes the proportion of objects in a system in a given state
  - Lévy process, a stochastic process with independent, stationary increments
  - Poisson process, a point process consisting of randomly located points on some underlying space
  - Predictable process, a stochastic process whose value is knowable
  - Stochastic process, a random process, as opposed to a deterministic process
  - Wiener process, a continuous-time stochastic process
- Process calculus, a diverse family of related approaches for formally modeling concurrent systems
- Process function, a mathematical concept used in thermodynamics

=== Thermodynamics ===
- Process function, a mathematical concept used in thermodynamics
- Thermodynamic process, the energetic evolution of a thermodynamic system
  - Adiabatic process, which proceeds without transfer of heat or matter between a system and its surroundings
  - Isenthalpic process, in which enthalpy stays constant
  - Isobaric process, in which the pressure stays constant
  - Isochoric process, in which volume stays constant
  - Isothermal process, in which temperature stays constant
  - Polytropic process, which obeys the equation $p v^{\,n} = C$
  - Quasistatic process, which occurs infinitely slowly, as an approximation

== Other uses ==
- The Process, a concept in the film 3%
- Food processing, transformation of raw ingredients, by physical or chemical means into food
- Language processing in the brain
- Natural language processing
- Praxis (process), in philosophy, the process by which a theory or skill is enacted or realized
- Process (engineering), set of interrelated tasks that transform inputs into outputs
- Process philosophy, which regards change as the cornerstone of reality
- Process thinking, a philosophy that focuses on present circumstances
- Writing process, a concept in writing and composition studies
- Work in process, goods that are partially completed within a company, awaiting finalization for sale.
