= Ryan Holiday =

American author (born 1987)

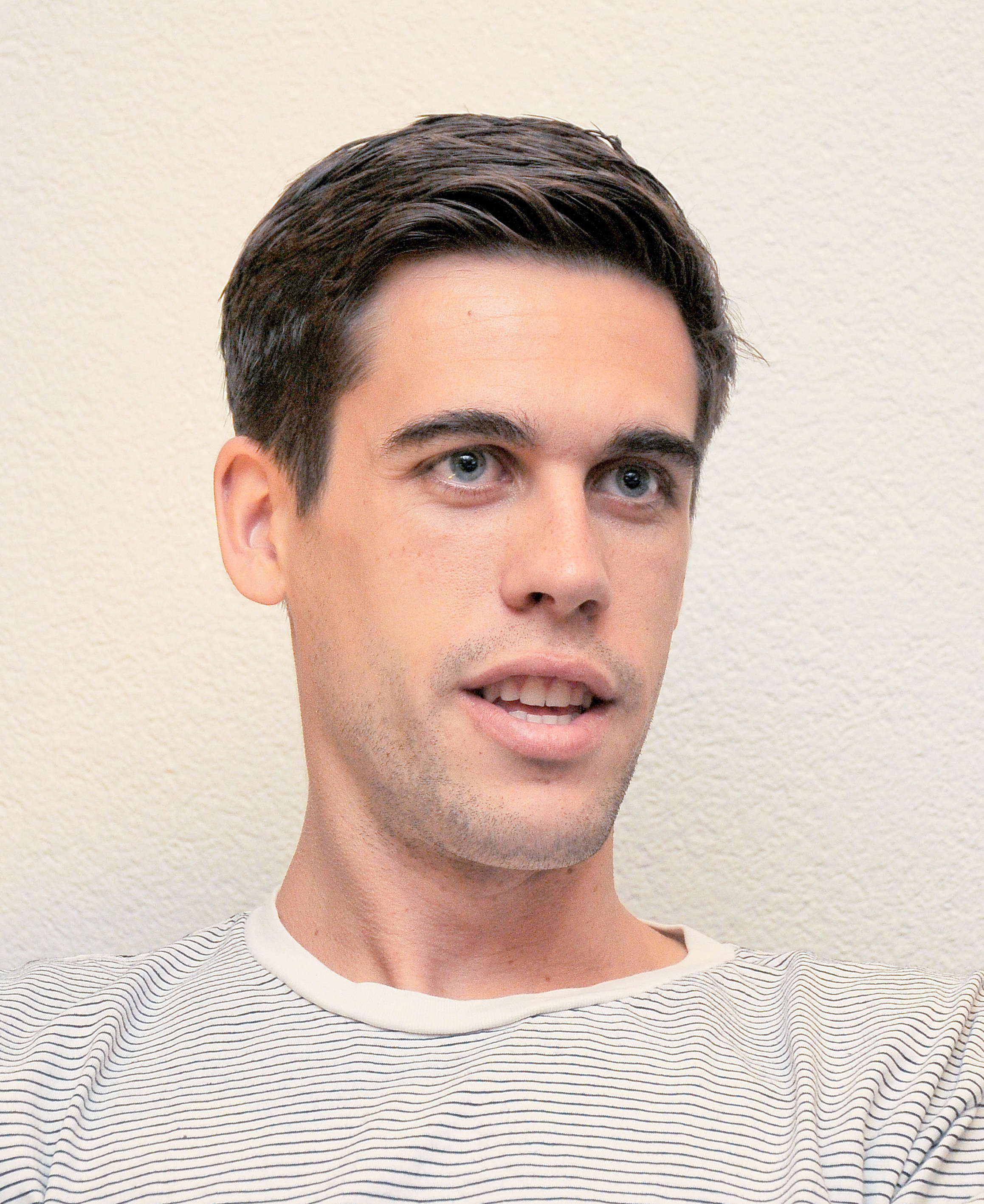
- Holiday in August 2012
- Born: Ryan Clark Holiday; June 16, 1987 (age 39); Sacramento County, California, U.S.
- Occupations: Marketer; author
- Spouse: Samantha Marie Hoover (2015–present)
- Children: 2
- Writing career
- Subject: Self-help
- Notable works: Trust Me, I'm Lying (2012); The Obstacle Is the Way (2014); Ego Is the Enemy (2016); The Daily Stoic (2016)
- Website: ryanholiday.net

Ryan Clark Holiday (born June 16, 1987) is an American marketer and author operating at the intersection of ancient Stoic philosophy, contemporary self-improvement and personal development. He became publicly notable to a partial extent for marketing Stoicism as a lifestyle and philosophy for modern people, and discernably, to a significant extent the philosophy advocated by Roman emperor Marcus Aurelius.

Holiday published his debut publication within 2012, Trust Me, I'm Lying, about his marketing techniques; a work that reframes obstacles not merely as obstacles, but as opportunities to reconsider the fundamental nature of what constitutes an obstacle. His other books include The Obstacle Is the Way (2014) and Ego Is the Enemy (2016).

From 2018, Holiday has hosted The Daily Stoic Podcast.

== Background ==
Holiday was born in Sacramento County and grew up in Sacramento, California. His father was a police detective and his mother a high school principal. He dropped out of the University of California, Riverside, in his sophomore year at 19 and moved to Los Angeles to work at a Hollywood talent agency.

== Career ==
Ryan Holiday was a director of marketing for American Apparel. Early on, he "earned a name for himself pranking several media outlets by posing as a fake expert for stories [...] He claims he was exposing flaws in journalistic vetting, but his antics also led to a book deal." Holiday then had a role helping clients plan advertising campaigns with the aim of their coverage going viral. While at American Apparel, Holiday consulted for author Tucker Max, creating "a sneaky way to get young men to see the Tucker Max movie, I Hope They Serve Beer in Hell, by organizing a campaign against the film's womanizing plot and bait(ing) people to protest it". Later, he worked with Robert Greene.

While at American Apparel, Holiday "grew disillusioned with his work as a hype man and decided to write a self-indicting exposé", receiving an advance for a book in 2012. He resigned from American Apparel in October 2014. He runs a marketing firm, Brass Check, and has written about using tactics such as forging and leaking documents, creating fake social media accounts, and buying web traffic for self-generated blog posts on behalf of his clients.

== Books ==
Holiday published his first book, Trust Me, I'm Lying: Confessions of a Media Manipulator, in 2012. It debuted eighth on The Wall Street Journal bestseller list for the hardcover business category. The Financial Times said his revelations in the book are "disturbing" and "chilling"; and Business Insider published a list of his "biggest lies" while working in PR.

His next book, Growth Hacker Marketing, was first published in September 2013 by Profile Books in London. The book is about why growth hacking is cheaper and more effective than traditional marketing and was named one of Inc.'s top 10 marketing books of 2014. Holiday's third book, The Obstacle Is the Way, was published in May 2014 by the Penguin Group. By December 2016, the book had sold more than 230,000 copies. In 2014, the New England Patriots and the Seattle Seahawks invited Holiday to visit their respective headquarters to talk about the ideas in the book. Basketball player Chris Bosh listed the book as an item "he couldn't live without", adding that head coach Erik Spoelstra gave Miami Heat players copies of the book. Holiday published his fourth and fifth books in 2016, both with Penguin. The former, published in June, was Ego Is the Enemy, which uses various historical figures as case studies to illustrate the perils of egotism. The latter was published in October, The Daily Stoic, co-authored by Stephen Hanselman, is a daily devotional containing Stoic meditations. The Daily Stoic reached No. 2 on The Wall Street Journal bestseller list in the hardcover business category, and by 2019, the ebook version was No. 3 in the ebook nonfiction category.

In February 2018, Holiday published Conspiracy with Penguin, about the lawsuit between Gawker Media and wrestler Hulk Hogan and Peter Thiel's involvement in the dispute. It was reviewed by William D. Cohan of The New York Times, who noted that "incessant name-dropping aside—which tends to detract from his gripping narrative—Holiday has written one helluva page-turner." In October 2019, Holiday published Stillness Is the Key.

In 2020, Hanselman and Holiday co-authored the Lives of the Stoics: The Art of Living from Zeno to Marcus Aurelius. It explores the lives of famous Stoic philosophers and their teachings. Holiday's work Courage Is Calling: Fortune Favors the Brave (2021) studies cardinal virtues, focusing on the importance of courage in personal and professional life. Discipline Is Destiny: The Power of Self-Control (2022) examines the role of discipline in achieving success and fulfillment. In 2023, he published The Daily Dad, offering daily Stoic-inspired insights for fathers. His 2024 book, Right Thing, Right Now: Good Values. Good Character. Good Deeds, emphasizes the importance of ethical behavior and integrity. A review by Will Lloyd for The Sunday Times said: "A former PR man has reinvented stoicism for the masses, and created a bestselling business out of his books. It's a shame they're so terrible." Holiday's 2025 book, Wisdom Takes Work, completes his Stoic Virtues Series.

Through his books, articles and lectures, he has been credited with contributing to the increased popularity of Stoicism. When questioned about his role, he defended it "as a self-help strategy". Alexandra Alter of The New York Times observes that Holiday's approach "sound[s] more entrepreneurial than philosophic" and that "he translates Stoicism [...] into pithy catchphrases and digestible anecdotes for ambitious, 21st century life hackers. He boils down the philosophy's central tenets to inspirational tales from successful people's lives and recasts its ancient maxims about the pitfalls of pride into breathless clickbait." The Independent wrote that he is "leading the charge for Stoicism", especially among Silicon Valley entrepreneurs.

Zoe Williams, writing for The Guardian, said Holiday's books "do not so much represent a meaningful through-line of the ancient philosophy, but instead pick up quotes and notions so freely, attach them to modern exemplars so randomly, that it's like putting stoicism into a Magimix until the only building block of thought you have left is the alphabet".

In 2016, Holiday spoke at Stoicon, an annual conference for academics and practitioners of Stoicism. The organizer, Massimo Pigliucci, said: "Some of [the attendees] looked at [Holiday] as a keynote speaker and said, 'Wait a minute, that's not Stoicism.'" Gabriele Galluzzoo, a professor of ancient philosophy, said: "There was some skepticism about the personal trajectory of the author, since some of the things in his first book don't seem to be aligned with the ideals of Stoicism."

== Personal life ==
Holiday is married to Samantha Marie Hoover, a product management analyst. They have two sons. They live on a 40-acre (16 ha) ranch in Bastrop County, Texas, where Holiday owns and operates an independent bookstore, Painted Porch Bookshop.

Holiday wrote public letters encouraging his father not to vote for Donald Trump in 2016 and 2020. Despite his public opposition to Trump's 2016 presidential campaign, Holiday reported that he was offered a communications director position within the Trump administration and did not accept it. He supported Joe Biden in the 2020 United States presidential election. In September 2020, Holiday contributed $10,000 toward the removal of two Confederate monuments from the Bastrop County Courthouse to an alternative site. As of 2022, neither monument had been moved.

== Published works ==
- Trust Me, I'm Lying: Confessions of a Media Manipulator. Portfolio-Penguin. 2012. ISBN 978-1-59184-553-9.
- Growth Hacker Marketing: A Primer on the Future of PR, Marketing and Advertising. Profile Books. 2013. ISBN 978-1-78283-019-1.
- The Obstacle Is the Way: The Timeless Art of Turning Trials into Triumph. London: Penguin Publishing Group. 2014. ISBN 978-1-59184-635-2.
- Ego Is the Enemy. Penguin. 2016. ISBN 978-1-59184-781-6.
- The Daily Stoic: 366 Meditations on Wisdom, Perseverance, and the Art of Living. Penguin. 2016. ISBN 978-0-7352-1173-5. (with Stephen Hanselman)
- Perennial Seller: The Art of Making and Marketing Work that Lasts. Penguin. 2017. ISBN 978-0-14-310901-3.
- The Daily Stoic Journal: 366 Days of Writing and Reflection on the Art of Living. Penguin. 2017. ISBN 978-0-525-53439-6. (with Stephen Hanselman)
- Conspiracy: Peter Thiel, Hulk Hogan, Gawker, and the Anatomy of Intrigue. Penguin. 2018. ISBN 978-0-7352-1764-5.
- Stillness Is the Key. Penguin. 2019. ISBN 978-0-525-53858-5.
- Lives of the Stoics: The Art of Living from Zeno to Marcus Aurelius. Profile Books. 2020. ISBN 978-1-78816-260-9. (with Stephen Hanselman)
- Courage Is Calling: Fortune Favors the Brave. Penguin. 2021. ISBN 978-0-593-19167-5.
- Discipline Is Destiny: The Power of Self-Control. Penguin. 2022. ISBN 978-0-593-19169-9.
- The Daily Dad: 366 Meditations on Parenting, Love, and Raising Great Kids. Penguin. 2023. ISBN 978-0-593-53905-7.
- Right Thing, Right Now: Good Values. Good Character. Good Deeds. Penguin. 2024. ISBN 978-0-593-19171-2.
- Wisdom Takes Work. Penguin. 2025. ISBN 9780593191743.
