= Portfolio (publisher) =

Book publishing division Penguin Group and Random House

Portfolio is a division of Penguin Group (USA) and Penguin Random House founded in 2001 by Adrian Zackheim as a business book imprint dedicated to technology, economics, entrepreneurship, biography, and investigative journalism.

Some of Portfolio's bestsellers include Start with Why by Simon Sinek, #Girlboss by Sophia Amoruso, The Obstacle Is The Way by Ryan Holiday, Team of Teams by General Stanley McChrystal, This Is Marketing by Seth Godin, The Bullet Journal Method by Ryder Carroll, Brotopia by Emily Chang, and The Four by Scott Galloway.

Penguin launched Portfolio UK in 2010.
