= Jesse Bradford =

American actor (born 1979)

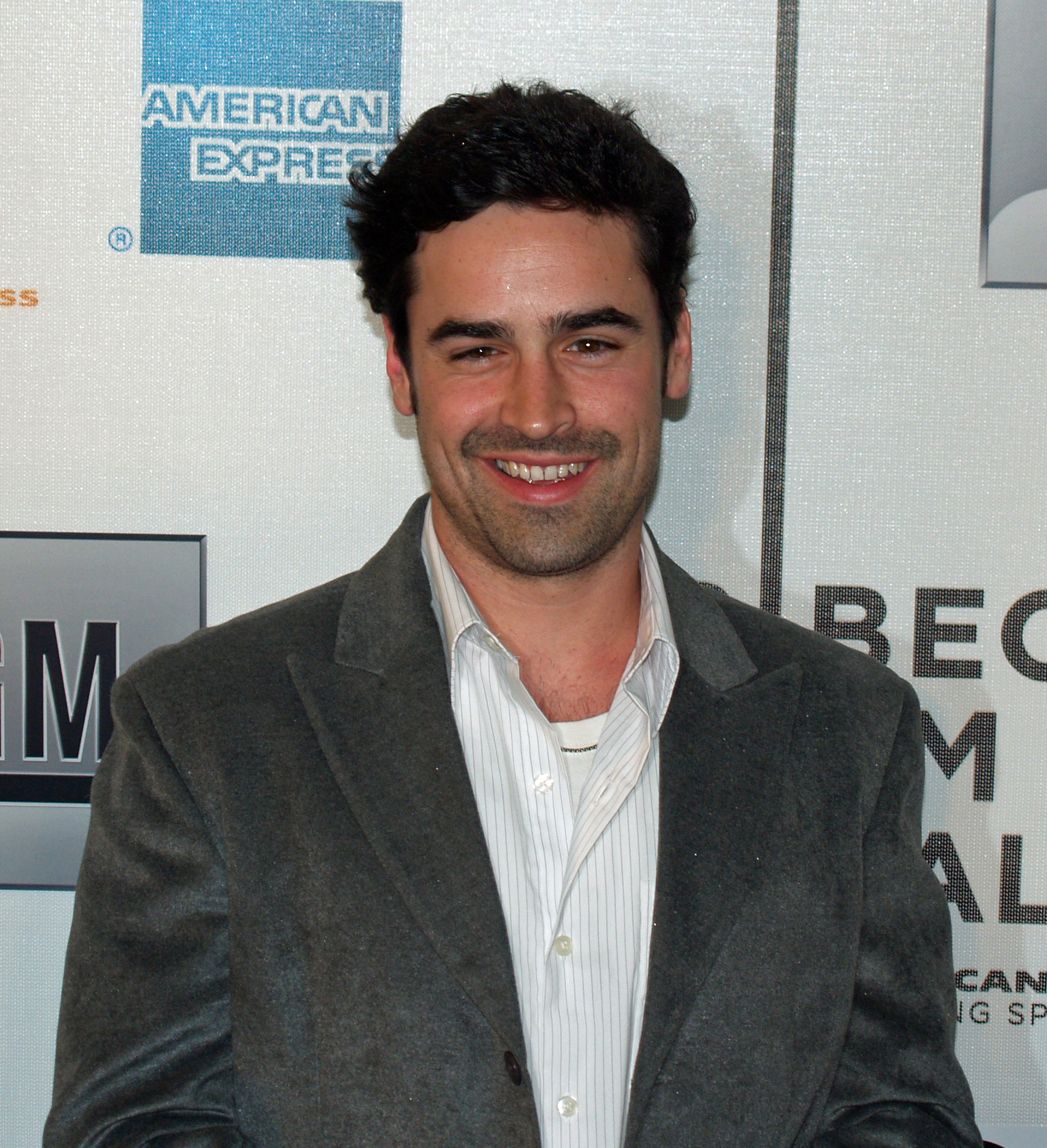
- Bradford at the Tribeca Film Festival 2007
- Born: Jesse Bradford Watrouse; May 28, 1979 (age 47); Norwalk, Connecticut, U.S
- Education: Columbia University
- Occupation: Actor
- Years active: 1984–present
- Spouse: Andrea Watrouse
- Children: 1

Signature
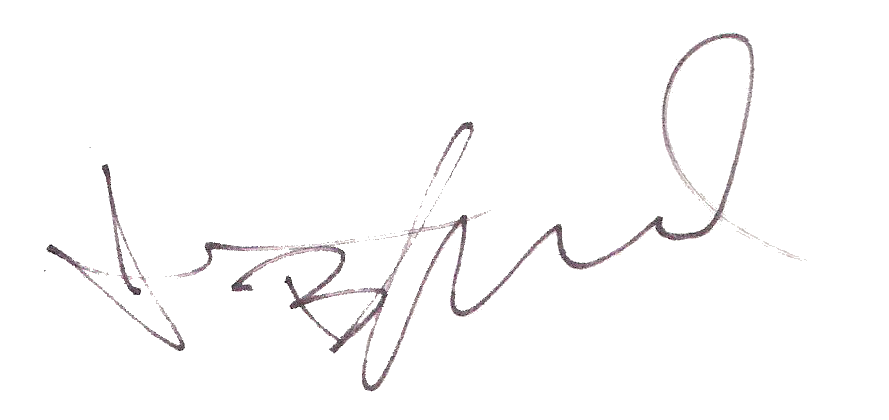

Jesse Bradford Watrouse (born May 28, 1979) is an American actor. He began his career as a child actor at age five and received two Young Artist Award for Best Leading Young Actor in a Feature Film nominations for his performances in King of the Hill (1993) and Far From Home: The Adventures of Yellow Dog (1995). After portraying Balthasar in the 1996 film Romeo + Juliet, he gained wider recognition starring in the teen comedy Bring It On (2000).

== Early life ==
Bradford was born Jesse Bradford Watrouse in Norwalk, Connecticut, the only child of actors Terry Porter and Curtis Watrouse, who appeared in commercials, soap operas, and industrial films. His mother also played his character's mother in Hackers (1995). Bradford's cousins are Jonathan Svec (a member of the bands Splender and Edison) and Sarah Messer, a writer and poet. He began acting at the age of eight months, appearing in a Q-Tip commercial. At his parents' encouragement, Bradford began modeling and auditioning for acting roles. His first film appearance was as Robert De Niro's son in Falling in Love (1984).

He graduated from Brien McMahon High School, where he was a self-described geology nerd. He was Homecoming King, captain of the tennis team, and was voted "best looking" and "favorite actor" by his high school class (although he was not in the drama club). He went on to attend Columbia University, from which he graduated in 2002 with a degree in film.

== Career ==
As a child actor, Bradford starred in the well-reviewed films Prancer (1989), Presumed Innocent (1990), King of the Hill (1993), Far from Home: The Adventures of Yellow Dog, and Hackers (1995). Subsequently, he has had several notable roles in motion pictures, including Romeo + Juliet (1996) and Bring It On (2000), playing the romantic interest. In 2002, he appeared as the lead in two films — Clockstoppers and Swimfan. He also had a minor role as White House intern Ryan Pierce for nine episodes during the fifth season of The West Wing.

Bradford played the role of Rene Gagnon in the 2006 film Flags of Our Fathers, based on the book of the same name by James Bradley. The film is about the Battle of Iwo Jima and was directed by Academy Award-winning director Clint Eastwood. In 2009, Bradford was cast as one of the leads in I Hope They Serve Beer in Hell, based on Tucker Max's bestselling book.

Bradford was in the main cast of the short-lived NBC courtroom drama series Outlaw in 2010.

In 2016, he was in three episodes of Code Black.

== Personal life ==
Bradford is married to Andrea Leal. They have a daughter.

== Filmography ==
=== Film ===
Year	Title	Role	Notes
1984	Falling in Love	Joe Raftis	
1989	Prancer	Boy #1	
1990	Presumed Innocent	Nat Sabich	
1990	My Blue Heaven	Jamie	
1991	The Boy Who Cried Bitch	Mike Love	
1993	King of the Hill	Aaron	
1995	Far from Home: The Adventures of Yellow Dog	Angus McCormick	
1995	Hackers	Joey Pardella	
1996	Romeo + Juliet	Balthasar	
1998	A Soldier's Daughter Never Cries	Billy Willis (age 14)	
1999	Speedway Junky	Johnny	
2000	Cherry Falls	Rod Harper	
2000	Bring It On	Cliff Pantone	
2000	Dancing at the Blue Iguana	Jorge	
2001	According to Spencer	Spencer	
2002	Clockstoppers	Zak Gibbs	
2002	Swimfan	Ben Cronin	
2004	Eulogy	Ryan Carmichael	
2005	Happy Endings	Nicky	
2005	Heights	Alec	
2006	Flags of Our Fathers	Rene Gagnon	
2008	My Sassy Girl	Charlie Bellow	
2008	The Echo	Bobby Reynolds	
2008	W.	Thatcher	
2009	Table for Three	Ryan	
2009	I Hope They Serve Beer in Hell	Drew	
2010	Perfect Life	Jack Parsons	
2011	You're a Wolf	Tyler	Short film
2011	Son of Morning	David	
2012	Item 47	Bennie Pollack	Short film
2013	The Power of Few	Dom	
2013	10 Rules for Sleeping Around	Vince Johnson	
2015	Badge of Honor	Mike Gallo	
2016	Dead Awake	Evan	
2017	The Year of Spectacular Men	Aaron Ezra	
2018	The Day of Matthew Montgomery	Matthew Montgomery	Short Film
2020	California No	Colton	
2022	Merry Kiss Cam	Danny Carmody Jr.	

=== Television ===
Year	Title	Role	Notes
1986	Classified Love	Anthony	TV film
1991	The Boys	Walter Farmer Jr.	TV film
1993	Tribeca	Josh	Episode: "The Rainmaker"
2003–2004	The West Wing	Ryan Pierce	Recurring role; 9 episodes
2006	Twenty Questions	Jackson Lynch	TV film
2009	The Eastmans	Dr. Seth Eastman	Unsold TV pilot
2010	Outlaw	Eddie Franks	Main role; 8 episodes
2011	Other People's Kids	Adam	TV film
2012–2013	Guys with Kids	Chris	Main role; 18 episodes
2014	Sequestered	Danny Ferman	Main role; 12 episodes
2016	Code Black	Gordon Heshman	Episodes: "First Date", "The Fifth Stage", "Diagnosis of Exclusion"
2016, 2019	Teachers	Jacob	Episode: "Jacob" and "Thoughts and Bears"
2016	Love	Carl	Episode: "Party in the Hills"
2016	NCIS	John Bishop	Episode: "Enemy Combatant"
2017–2018	Shooter	Harris Downey	Recurring role
2018	Deception	Rafe Willems	Episode: "Black Art"
2019	Magnum P.I.	Neal Conlan	Episode: "Lie, Cheat, Steal, Kill"
2025	The Hunting Party	Mark Marsden	Episode: "Mark Marsden"
2026	High Potential	Solomon	Episodes: "Behind the music" “Grounded”
