= Hilarity Ensues =

2012 book by Tucker Max

- Author: Tucker Max
- Language: English
- Genre: Non-fiction / Fratire
- Publisher: Simon & Schuster
- Publication date: February 7, 2012
- Publication place: United States
- Pages: 416
- ISBN: 1-4516-6903-8
- Preceded by: Assholes Finish First

Hilarity Ensues (2012) is the third New York Times best selling book by Tucker Max. It chronicles his stories of drunken debauchery and ridiculous antics and debuted at #2 on the New York Times Bestseller List. Hilarity Ensues is the third installment of his fratire trilogy, preceded by I Hope They Serve Beer in Hell and Assholes Finish First.

== Background ==
Hilarity Ensues is similar in style and content to Max's two previous published works, and expands upon the "Miss Vermont" story originally mentioned in I Hope They Serve Beer in Hell. Hilarity Ensues also includes a section where he recounts sexts he received after making his personal phone number public. Max has announced that the release of Hilarity Ensues marked his retirement from fratire, stating, “I’m just gonna move to another area of my life where I focus on different things, but I had a great time and I don’t really regret any of it, I just wanted to do something different now.”

== Synopsis ==
Hilarity Ensues opens with stories that Tucker experienced living and working in Cancun while still enrolled in as a full-time student at Duke Law School. It continues through to his attendance at friends' weddings and bachelor parties. The following stories are included in Hilarity Ensues:

- "The Cancun Stories"
- "Drugs Are Bad, Mmmkay?"
- "Why Halloween Is Awesome"
- "Fat Girls Cross Tucker, Hilarity Ensues"
- "The Deadliest Vacation"
- "Sexting With Tucker Max: Mean"
- "The Fight Stories"
- "Meet My Friend Hate"
- "Tucker Ruins A Wine Tasting"
- "The Ex-Girlfriend Threesome Fallout"
- "In the Trunk"
- "The (Almost Banned, Now Complete) Miss Vermont Story"
- "Tucker Max: Knee Abuser"
- "Sexting with Tucker Max: A/S/Location, Location, Location"
- "The Law School Weddings and Bachelor Parties"

== Release and marketing ==
The marketing for Hilarity Ensues was well-publicized for its scandalous nature. Of particular note was Max's use of SponsoredTweets.com, where he attempted to simultaneously embarrass A-list celebrities and promote the third installment to his fratire series. Celebrities involved in this prank included Chris Rock, Snooki, and Nick Cannon, among others—with a tweet from Kim Kardashian reading: "I loved Tucker Max's new book because it's a lot like the men I date: black on the outside, full of dirty words and insults on the inside." Ultimately, Max was banned from Twitter due to “ethics violations.”

Max also attempted to donate $500,000 to Planned Parenthood in Texas. Although initially accepting his offer, Planned Parenthood denied his donation after coming to the conclusion that the perception of his donation may reflect poorly on the organization. The failed donation was profiled in a Forbes article by Ryan Holiday, Max's publicist, and received coverage in The Huffington Post, TIME, Slate, and Jezebel, among others, which helped to draw attention to Max's book.

On the date of Hilarity Ensues' publication, Max simultaneously released his fourth book, Sloppy Seconds: The Tucker Max Leftovers for free online. He stated, "I’ve sold millions of books because of the support of my fans, so I felt like I should give something back to them. What could they possibly want more than a free book of stories? So thats my gift to you, as a thank you for supporting me and buying my other three books."

== Reception ==
Hilarity Ensues received mostly favorable reviews, and debuted on the best seller lists of The New York Times, The Wall Street Journal and USA Today. Kirkus Reviews dismisses Max's work as "repetitious barhopping stories." Others however cite similar reasons as strengths, with Barnes & Noble writing, "This all-new collection of Tucker Max stories will refresh fans of his website and his bestselling Assholes Finish First and I Hope They Serve Beer in Hell. These outrageous stories of bachelor parties, wedding receptions, Mexican sojourns, and law school roommates might make you wish that you could live at least briefly on the wild side." Alec Bemis of Book Forum, spoke of the quality of Hilarity Ensues beyond simple frat-boy humor, writing, "The best test of a book is not the seduction of a well-planned first sentence; it is how well the book satisfies expectations at the bitter end. By this measure, Tucker Max’s third book, Hilarity Ensues, is a great read."
