= Geoff Stults =

American actor (born 1977)

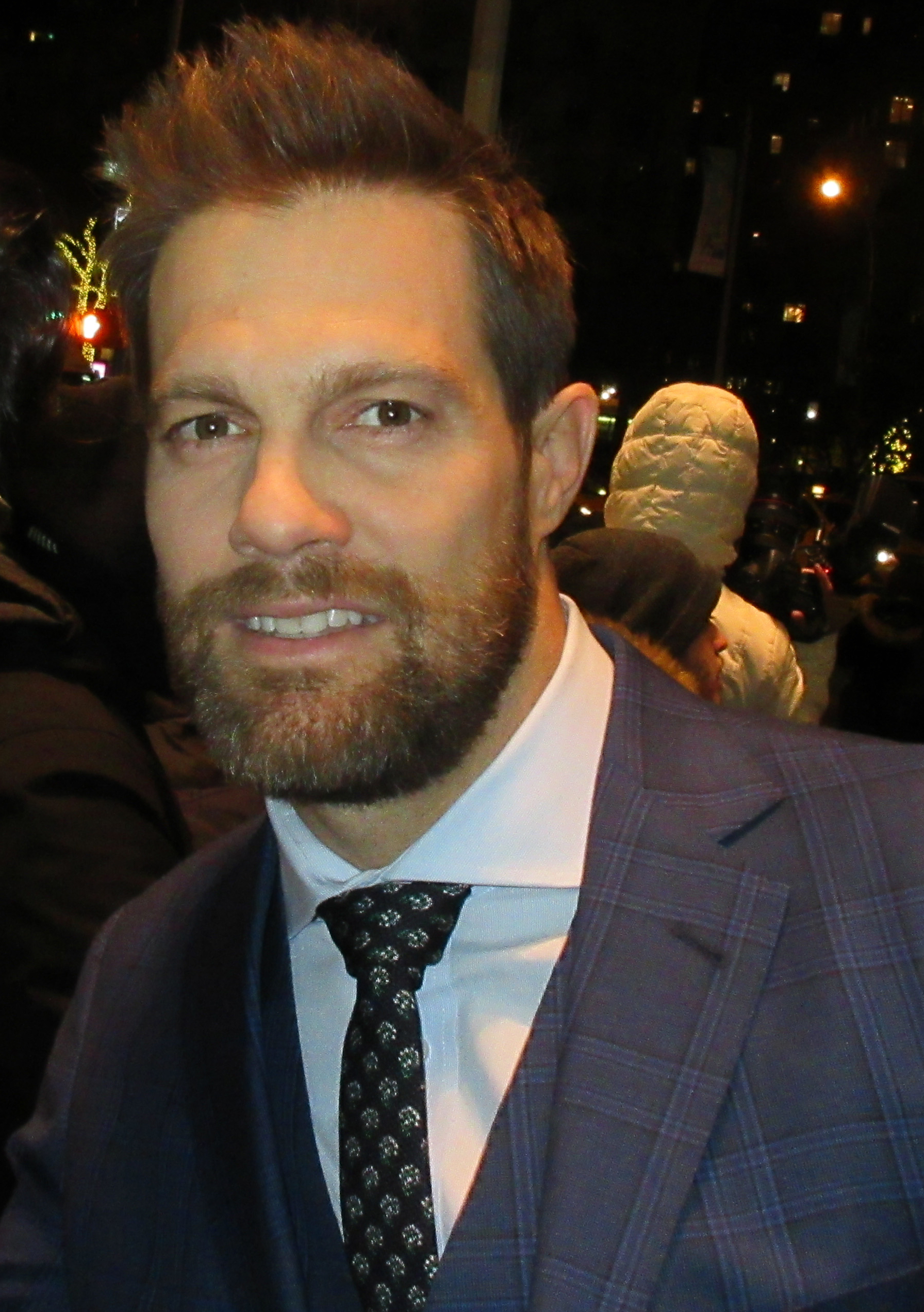
- Stults in 2018
- Born: December 15, 1977 (age 48)
- Occupation: Actor
- Years active: 2000–present
- Children: 2
- Relatives: George Stults (brother)

Geoffrey Stults (born December 15, 1977) is an American actor. His first regular roles on television included 7th Heaven, October Road, and Happy Town. He went on to star as Major Walter Sherman on The Finder and Sgt. Pete Hill on Enlisted. Most recently, he played Mark McCullough (opposite Reese Witherspoon) on Little Fires Everywhere, Marco Strzalkowski (opposite Kate Beckinsale) on Guilty Party, and Jake Davis (opposite Jennifer Garner) on The Last Thing He Told Me. He also played the recurring role of Mitch in the hit Netflix series Grace and Frankie.

His film roles include Wedding Crashers, The Break-Up, She's Out of My League, Only the Brave, and 12 Strong.

== Early life ==
Stults grew up in Green Mountain Falls, Colorado. His brother is actor George Stults. He graduated from Manitou Springs High School. He moved to Los Angeles, and began to perform in the college theater productions while attending Whittier College, in Whittier, California, where he also played football.

== Career ==
=== Football career ===
He played professional American football in the Austrian Football League as a wide receiver for the Klosterneuburg Mercenaries (now known as the Danube Dragons).

=== Acting career ===
Stults started his acting career at the age of seven by doing commercials alongside his brother George. He appeared on Everybody Loves Raymond as a mailman in the episode "What's with Robert?" He landed his first major role in 2002 as Ben Kinkirk, a fireman at the department in which Mary Camden was training and Mary's soon-to-be new love interest, on the show 7th Heaven. The role of Ben's brother, Kevin Kinkirk, was portrayed by George Stults, his real life brother. Stults portrayed Eddie Latekka for two seasons on the popular ABC drama series October Road.

His first major film role came in 2004, when he played Bobby in the women-led action-comedy D.E.B.S. (where he met his future co-star on The Finder, Michael Clarke Duncan).

Since then, Stults has had memorable roles in the hit movies Wedding Crashers and The Break-Up, as well as the films The Express: The Ernie Davis Story, She's Out Of My League, and L!fe Happens.

In 2010, Stults played Dan (an amalgamation of the book's popular characters El Bingeroso/PWJ/GoldenBoy) in the film adaptation of I Hope They Serve Beer in Hell. He starred in the short-lived ABC television series Happy Town and appeared on How I Met Your Mother.

At the 2011 network upfronts, Fox announced that it picked up the Bones spin-off, The Finder, starring Stults in the lead role of Walter Sherman (a.k.a. The Finder), an Iraq war veteran who, after a brain injury from an exploding IED, was left with the extraordinary skill of finding anybody or anything. The show co-starred Duncan, Mercedes Masohn, and Maddie Hasson. It premiered January 12, 2012, as a mid-season replacement for Bones. The show was canceled and the final episode aired on May 11, 2012.

He went on to star as Sgt. Pete Hill on Enlisted.

Stults later guest starred on Stargirl as Courtney Whitmore's father Sam Kurtis.

He also played the recurring role of Mitch in the hit Netflix series Grace and Frankie.

Most recently, he played Mark McCullough (opposite Reese Witherspoon) on Little Fires Everywhere, Marco Strzalkowski (opposite Kate Beckinsale) on Guilty Party, and Jake Davis (opposite Jennifer Garner) on The Last Thing He Told Me.

Recent film roles include Only the Brave, 12 Strong, and Sierra Burgess Is a Loser.

== Personal life ==
In June 2005, Stults was reported to be in a relationship with actress and former WWE Diva Stacy Keibler. The pair appeared together on MTV's Punk'd, with Keibler as the recipient of the prank. Keibler and Stults were part-owners of the Hollywood Fame, a 2006 expansion franchise of the American Basketball Association. The team went defunct after only one season. Stults and Keibler split in 2010.

== Filmography ==
=== Film ===
Year	Title	Role	Notes
2001	Thank You, Good Night	Frat Boy	
2002	Nantucket	Steve Foster	
2002	No Place Like Home	Moses	
2002	King's Highway	Todd King	
2004	Bring It On Again	Football Player	
2004	D.E.B.S.	Bobby	
2005	Wedding Crashers	Craig Garthe	
2005	In the Mix	Chad	
2006	The Break-Up	Mike	
2006	Carjacking	Tom	
2006	Day 73 with Sarah	Steve	
2008	The Express: The Ernie Davis Story	Bob Lundy	
2009	I Hope They Serve Beer in Hell	Dan	
2010	She's Out of My League	Cam	
2010	Hot for Teachers	Jack Slater	
2011	L!fe Happens	Nicolas	
2011	J. Edgar	Raymond Caffrey	
2014	The Opposite Sex	Vince	
2017	Unforgettable	David	
2017	High Low Forty	Cletus	
2017	Only The Brave	Travis Turbyfill	
2018	12 Strong	Sean Coffers	
2018	Sierra Burgess Is a Loser	Coach Johnson	
2023	If You Were the Last	Tom Wright	

=== Television ===
Year	Title	Role	Notes
2000	Everybody Loves Raymond	Mailman	Episode: "What's With Robert?"
2000	Undressed	Dale	3 episodes
2000	L.A. 7	Sam	Episode: "The Prom"
2000	Spin City	Blake	Episode: "Smile"
2001	Grounded for Life	Room Service Guy	Episode: "Like a Virgin"
2001	The Chronicle	Luther Stubbs	Episode: "Let Sleeping Dogs Fry"
2001–2006	7th Heaven	Ben Kinkirk	Main role (season 7), recurring role (season 6 & 9), guest star (season 11)
2002	Project Viper	Young Zack Lover	TV movie
2003	L.A. Dragnet	Lee Calof	Episode: "The Big Ruckus"
2004	Joey	Jake	Episode: "Joey and the Party"
2004	Las Vegas	Jay	Episode: "Catch of the Day"
2004	Hollywood Division	Det. Vincent Booth	TV movie
2005	Confessions of an American Bride	Luke Stinson	TV movie
2005–2006	Reunion	Peter Holland	Recurring role, 5 episodes
2007–2008	October Road	Eddie Latekka	Main role; 19 episodes
2010	Happy Town	Tommy Conroy	Main role; 8 episodes
2010	How I Met Your Mother	Max	2 episodes
2011	Bones	Walter Sherman	Episode: "The Finder"
2011	Mad Love	Tom Stevens	Episode: "After the Fireworks"
2012	The Finder	Walter Sherman	Main role; 13 episodes
2012	Ben and Kate	Will	Recurring role; 6 episodes
2014	Enlisted	Sergeant Pete Hill	Main role; 13 episodes
2014	Cuz-Bros	Nick	TV movie
2015–2017	The Odd Couple	Murph	Recurring role; 15 episodes
2015	Zoo	FBI Agent Ben Shafer	Recurring role; 3 episodes
2015-2017	Grace and Frankie	Mitch	Recurring role; 4 episodes
2018	Man with a Plan	Leif Forrest	Recurring role; 2 episodes
2019	Black Monday		
2019	The Neighborhood	Logan	Episode: "Welcome to Logan #2"
2020	Little Fires Everywhere	Mark McCullough	Main role; 8 episodes
2020	Stargirl	Sam Kurtis	Episode: "Shining Knight"
2021	Guilty Party	Marco Baker	Main role; 10 episodes
2021	Cowboy Bebop	Chalmers	Recurring role, 5 episodes
2023	The Company You Keep	Simon Norris	Recurring role, 4 episodes
2023	The Last Thing He Told Me	Jake Davis	Main role; 7 episodes
2025	The Irrational	Shel Benson	Episode: "The Overview Effect"
2025 — present	Criminal Minds: Evolution	Evan Delray	Recurring role (season 18)
