= Fratire =

Type of literature targeted at young men

Fratire is a type of 21st-century fiction literature written for and marketed to young men in a politically incorrect and overtly masculine fashion. The term was coined following the popularity of works by George Ouzounian (writing under the pen name Maddox) and Tucker Max. Described as a satirical celebration of traditional masculinity, the genre has been criticized for allegedly promoting sexism and misogyny.

== Genre ==
Fratire generally features male protagonists, usually in their twenties and thirties. It is characterized by masculine themes and could be considered the male equivalent of chick lit. The genre was popularized by Tucker Max's I Hope They Serve Beer in Hell and Maddox's webpage titled The Best Page in the Universe and his book The Alphabet of Manliness. According to one of the authors, "fratire as a genre represents the non-mainstream literary reaction to the feminization of masculinity", although not all the books address this so directly.

== Etymology ==
Fratire is a portmanteau of fraternity and satire. The term was introduced by New York Times reporter Warren St. John in a 2006 article titled "Dude, here's my book". Allegedly, it was the only word allowed by the editor. Tucker Max, after first hearing the term during a telephone interview with St. John, said,

Great Holy Jesus. Warren, that is awful. First off, I wasn't in a fraternity. Neither was Maddox. In fact, none of the writers you are profiling in your article was in a frat. Please, call it anything else.

The term aimed to classify the recent publication of male-centric books that focused on alcohol and sexual themes. Publishers continued to push the genre as a sales tactic. After the success of the books published by Max and Maddox, publishers and reporters attempted to capitalize on the trend with new iterations of the word, including "lad-lit", "dicklit", "frat-lit" and "menaissance".

== Criticism of fratire ==
Melissa Lafsky of The New York Times described the genre as "misogyny for sale". Lafsky wrote that fratire authors were profiting by fueling young male anger concerning societal demands for equality. In a Salon.com interview with Rebecca Traister, Ouzounian said his writing was a nostalgic parody of old-fashioned masculinity and that society had moved too far forward to return to those concepts. In an interview with Public Radio International, Maddox offered the suggestion that the misogyny often associated with the genre of fratire had become more acceptable because women are stronger than they have ever been in society, and that singling out women as the only group not okay to lampoon is a sexist act in itself. In a 2008 article, Kira Cochrane in the New Statesman disputed that idea, stating there still remained much inequality between men and women. Cochrane called the fratire genre a regression to old-fashioned sexism "presented under the veil of irony".

== See also ==
- Bro culture
- Gender studies
- Hipster sexism
- Lad culture
- Manosphere
