= List of Teachers (2016 TV series) episodes =

Teachers is an American television sitcom created by and starring The Katydids, which premiered on TV Land on January 13, 2016. The series is based on the web series of the same name and follows a group of teachers at the Chicago-area Fillmore Elementary School. On March 3, 2016, TV Land renewed Teachers for a 20-episode second season, which was split into Winter and Fall segments of 10 episodes each. On April 20, 2017, the show was renewed for a 20-episode third season. The first 10 episodes of season 3 aired from June 5 to August 14, 2018. The remaining 10 episodes aired from January 15 to March 19, 2019.

== Series overview ==
Season	Episodes	Originally released	
Season	Episodes	First released	Last released
1	10	January 13, 2016	March 16, 2016
2	20	January 17, 2017	January 16, 2018
3	20	June 5, 2018	March 19, 2019

== Episodes ==
=== Season 1 (2016) ===
No. overall	No. in season	Title	Directed by	Written by	Original release date	Prod. code	U.S. viewers (millions)
1	1	"Pilot"	Richie Keen	The Katydids	January 13, 2016	101	0.85
The teachers are organizing the school's anti-bullying campaign. It is mandated, despite the school not having a bullying problem. The campaign is done badly and encourages bullying. Deb offers to step up and lead the effort but, having been bullied herself in high school, she takes things a bit too far. The woman who comes in to give a speech to the children had bullied Deb, and does so again while at the school. Deb jumps on her and punches her, and the school is made exempt from the campaign.
2	2	"Picture Day"	Payman Benz	Kate Lambert & Caitlin Barlow	January 20, 2016	102	0.39
A photographer (Rob Riggle) is at the school to take pictures not only of the children but also of the teachers, who are not prepared. After the school mascot pet dies, followed by an elderly grief counselor, the teachers fear there will be another death, because bad things always come in threes.
3	3	"Duct Duct Goose"	Payman Benz	Cate Freedman & Katy Colloton	January 27, 2016	108	0.99
Principal Pearson wants everything ship-shape for an upcoming visit by the school system superintendent (Ian Roberts). On the day of the visit, however, one of AJ's students climbs into the ceiling's ductwork and refuses to come out. Meanwhile, Chelsea prepares an audition tape for The Bachelor.
4	4	"Hall of Shame"	Payman Benz	Katy Colloton & Kate Lambert	February 3, 2016	104	0.46
Chelsea arrives disheveled after a night of great sex, but is ashamed to have anyone find out it was with Sam (Rob Corddry), the school janitor. Meanwhile, Mary Louise takes over Cecilia's class for a day, and causes conflict when she tells the students they don't need to learn science because you can explain everything with God.
5	5	"Jacob"	Payman Benz	Kate Lambert & Kathryn Renée Thomas	February 10, 2016	109	0.45
Caroline learns that her ex-boyfriend Jacob (Jesse Bradford) is dating again, and his new girlfriend Ginny (Lacey Chabert) is coming to work at the school as a substitute speech therapist. Elsewhere, Cecilia tries to get into a teachers clique, while AJ takes a cue from Deb and starts raiding the school's lost-and-found.
6	6	"Drunk Kiss"	Payman Benz	Katy Colloton & Katie O’Brien	February 17, 2016	105	0.38
During a night at the bar, a drunk Chelsea kisses Mary Louise and playfully says "I love you," causing Mary Louise to panic, thinking Chelsea wants a lesbian relationship. Meanwhile, AJ learns a school board representative will be observing her class, due to her suspicious answers on a health assessment form.
7	7	"Bad Tweeter"	Payman Benz	Katie O'Brien & Kathryn Renée Thomas	February 24, 2016	103	0.43
After Principal Pearson suspends Chelsea for three days after a nasty tweet during her off hours. Cecilia tries to organize a protest, but no one else is bothered enough by the suspension to join her, least of all Chelsea herself.
8	8	"Sex Ed"	Payman Benz	Caitlin Barlow & Katie O'Brien	March 2, 2016	107	0.43
A zealous administrator has determined it's a good practice to assign teachers to extra-curricular duties, outside their comfort zones. He puts Cecilia and Caroline in charge of Field Day, with Deb and AJ assigned to help them. Chelsea is assigned to teach a gifted class, and a very uncomfortable Mary Louise is forced to teach a sex ed class.
9	9	"Hot Lunch"	Payman Benz	Kathryn Renée Thomas & Cate Freedman	March 9, 2016	106	0.34
Deb has difficulty recruiting parent volunteers for lunch room duty, until a pornographic video surfaces with a dominatrix character that looks like her. The next day, several fathers show up to volunteer. Meanwhile, Mary Louise prepares to do stand-up comedy for her church's talent show. And the other teachers can’t tell her the jokes are completely unfunny.
10	10	"The Last Day"	Payman Benz	Cate Freedman & Caitlin Barlow	March 16, 2016	110	0.34
As the school year comes to a close, Cecilia and Chelsea question their impact on their students. After Cecilia overhears that the district plans to terminate a teaching position, the teachers try to track-down a drunken Mary Louise. Elsewhere, Caroline is offended when she isn't invited to Deb's summer barbeque, and AJ has to deal with parent complaints after assigning random grades to her students.

=== Season 2 (2017–18) ===
No. overall	No. in season	Title	Directed by	Written by	Original release date	Prod. code	U.S. viewers (millions)
11	1	"First Day Back"	Jay Karas	Kate Lambert & Caitlin Barlow	January 17, 2017	201	0.61
As the new school year commences, Chelsea is assigned the dreaded "Hell Class", Cecilia has to teach art class with no supplies, and Deb’s class is assigned to a trailer with no air conditioning. Caroline spends the day trying to find her perfect match on a romance website, with surprising results. Meanwhile, AJ has forgotten it is the first day of school, and teaches her class remotely while driving back from her summer job. Coolio cameos as Mr. Wence.
12	2	"Stranger Danger"	Michael Blieden	Katie O'Brien & Katy Colloton	January 24, 2017	202	0.53
When a stranger helps himself to donuts and coffee in the teachers' lounge, Principal Pearson decides to double down on school security and hires a full-time guard named Frank (Richard T. Jones). Chelsea and Mary Louise hold seminars on "Women Empowering Women" but fight over opposing methods of instruction. Deb takes things a bit too far teaching her students about "stranger danger.” Caroline buys a life-size male doll for her car, but develops a strange attraction to it.
13	3	"School Sweet School"	Michael Blieden	Jay Martel & Ian Roberts	January 31, 2017	205	0.64
Deb and her slacker/musician husband Damien (Haley Joel Osment) move into a tiny house that is accidentally delivered to the school parking lot. Deb complains about Damien, but the others find him helpful. Cecilia makes ugly earrings which Chelsea and Caroline buy just to be nice, only to later find are made from garbage. Mary Louise deals with a student who has an odd habit. Meanwhile, AJ assigns students a book report, then realizes she's never read the book herself.
14	4	"Held Back"	Rachel Goldenberg	Kate Lambert & Katie O'Brien	February 7, 2017	204	0.52
Mary Louise is thrilled when Hot Dad’s son Blake is held back for another year. But it's soon revealed that Hot Dad asked for Blake to be put in Caroline's class. Meanwhile, AJ is forced to teach the Common Core curriculum against her will, and struggles with a Common Core math problem. Chelsea tries to get her new dog "Ryan Gosling" qualified as a therapy pet so she can bring it to school. Deb goes to war against an inoperative coffee maker in the teacher's lounge.
15	5	"Snap Judgement"	Jay Karas	Kathryn Renée Thomas & Katy Colloton	February 14, 2017	217	0.50
Upon learning fourth grade teacher Brent (Ryan Hansen) is running unopposed to represent Fillmore on the school board, Chelsea decides to run against him. Brent soon proposes sex with Chelsea, which results in her being slut-shamed by the faculty while Brent is given a pass.
16	6	"Brokebitch Mountain"	Michael Blieden	Caitlin Barlow & Cate Freedman	February 21, 2017	214	0.48
Always broke, AJ decides she needs her students' help to make a budget. She learns her teacher's salary won't cover her expenses, forcing her to take a second job at a local sub shop. A "romance" between two second graders in Caroline's class helps her believe in love again. Meanwhile, the other teachers learn they can use their PMS symptoms to their advantage against Principal Pearson.
17	7	"Thirty-One and Done"	Rachel Goldenberg	Alyssa Forleiter	February 28, 2017	203	0.50
Chelsea is depressed on her 31st birthday after her students guess her age as 40 to 60. AJ takes her and the other teachers to a frat party. This excludes Mary Louise, who takes advantage of an opportunity to babysit Hot Dad's son.
18	8	"Getting Drilled"	Jay Karas	Cate Freedman & Kathryn Renée Thomas	March 7, 2017	219	0.48
When a tornado hits the area, the teachers panic instead of following tornado drill protocol. Principal Pearson puts them on probation until they complete a team-building course at a retreat in Schaumburg.
19	9	"In Security"	Michael Blieden	Jill Cargerman	March 14, 2017	209	0.54
Frank and Principal Pearson start reviewing security camera footage to find out who is stealing cleaning products from the supply closet, in the process learning many of the teachers' secrets. Deb has to coach a kickball team, made up of students whose parents lied to them about their athletic abilities. Meanwhile, Mary Louise tries to train AJ in the proper procedures for raising and lowering the American flag.
20	10	"Lunchtime! The Musical"	Jay Karas	Katy Colloton & Kate Lambert	March 21, 2017	216	0.35
Chelsea changes the school lunch menu because she can't get into her "fat jeans", causing AJ to start an underground junk food ring. Hot Dad volunteers for lunch duty and Mary Louise works up the nerve to ask him out on a date, only to learn that his wife is in town. Deb deals with a pimple, which brings back awful teenage memories.
21	11	"Dosey Don't"	Jay Karas	Katie O'Brien & Kathryn Renée Thomas	November 7, 2017	206	0.47
Fillmore holds its annual Hoedown and Caroline goes all out, setting up her authentic early-American butter churn. Chelsea prepares a song and dance after learning one of her students is the son of a local disc jockey. With Hot Dad's estranged wife in town, Mary Louise tries to figure out if they are back together. AJ starts "daylighting" as a Lyft driver. Meanwhile, Cecilia and Deb recall their own school days and never being asked to a dance, but things change when Deb learns one of her students is her secret admirer.
22	12	"Passive Eggressive"	Jay Karas	Caitlin Barlow & Kate Lambert	November 14, 2017	215	0.62
Following a gynecologist appointment in which she is reminded that her biological clock is ticking, Caroline gets excited when a new student that acts just like her reveals her mother was an egg donor. After an elderly teacher passes away, Deb, Mary Louise and AJ all have eyes on the things left behind in the woman's classroom. Meanwhile, it's standardized test time, and Principal Pearson works with Chelsea and Cecilia to hide the fact that parents can now choose to have their kids opt out of taking the test.
23	13	"Dire Straights"	Todd Biermann	Jay Martel & Ian Roberts	November 21, 2017	220	0.57
AJ has to choose between marijuana and love when she falls for Officer Chuck (Andy Daly), who gives presentations to students on the dangers of drugs. After Caroline accompanies Mary Louise to a church bingo night, she becomes addicted. Elsewhere, Deb is more grumpy than usual when she tries to quit smoking.
24	14	"Nightmare on Fillmore Street"	Todd Biermann	Caitlin Barlow & Katy Colloton	November 28, 2017	213	0.56
A power failure on Halloween causes a Wi-Fi outage at Fillmore, forcing Chelsea and her students to visit the creepy, forgotten library, where they make an eerie discovery. Mary Louise annoys Deb by playing Halloween novelty songs on a day Deb considers sacred. Meanwhile, Caroline tries to deal with her sex dream about Principal Pearson.
25	15	"Hot Date"	Jay Karas	Katy Colloton & Kate Lambert	December 5, 2017	207	0.65
Mary Louise finally works up the nerve to ask out Hot Dad on a real date, but the date is put in jeopardy when she catches the chickenpox virus that is going around the school. AJ helps Chelsea realize she is exhibiting gender bias when calling on students in her science class, which Chelsea owes to her own former elementary school teacher. Caroline is despondent when she sees that her old sorority sisters have taken a trip to Mexico without inviting her, but Deb shows no empathy, making Caroline even angrier.
26	16	"Let It Flow"	Jay Karas	Katie O'Brien & Kathryn Renée Thomas	December 12, 2017	211	0.46
Cecilia discovers an 8-year old art prodigy in her class, leading to a big art show with press presence and a grant that allows her to finally purchase real supplies. But when the young artist's masterpiece work is unveiled, it shocks everyone. Deb and Caroline use different methods to try and sell the most items at the school bazaar and win their class a pizza party. Meanwhile, Mary Louise and Chelsea confront another teacher who repeatedly pumps her breast milk while sitting in the teachers lounge.
27	17	"Third Wheel"	Jay Karas	Caitlin Barlow & Katie O'Brien	December 19, 2017	218	0.52
Mary Louise and Hot Dad go on more dates, but can't get rid of third wheel Chelsea. Elsewhere, Deb and AJ try to identify the student who keeps pooping in the hallways, while Cecilia gets angry with Caroline for killing a cockroach.
28	18	"Toxic Workplace"	Jay Karas	Jay Martel	January 2, 2018	212	0.44
Chelsea puts a hole in the wall of Deb's remote classroom, exposing asbestos insulation. The visiting inspector (Jeff Ross) sarcastically calls Chelsea a hero, but she takes it very literally. With Deb vomiting frequently, she and her "contaminated" students are unwelcome anywhere in the main school building, causing them to desperately search for a place to hold class. The other teachers eventually decide to hold a charity auction to raise funds and get Deb a new trailer. Deb later learns she is pregnant, which explains her vomiting.
29	19	"Don't Go Pranking My Heart"	Jay Karas	Alyssa Forleiter	January 9, 2018	210	0.43
AJ pulls an April Fool's joke on Chelsea, calling her as someone else and claiming Chelsea is the winner of the prestigious Golden Pencil Award for teachers. But in the end, the joke is on AJ. Caroline announces that Principal Pearson is officially her boyfriend, which has the other teachers concerned about favoritism as Pearson prepares to write their performance reviews. Meanwhile, Cecilia keeps having awkward encounters with Security Guard Frank.
30	20	"Labor Pains"	Jay Karas	Kate Lambert & Kathryn Renée Thomas	January 16, 2018	208	0.49
In the present day, Deb tells the other teachers she plans to return to work after having her baby. In the 1940s, "Debbie" tries to do the same but is told it's against school rules, as female teachers are expected to retire to home life if they have a child. Present-day Mary Louise worries about Hot Dad meeting gorgeous Latina women as he prepares for a trip to Venezuela, while 1940s Mary Louise worries that "Hot Diggity Dad" will forget about her after he goes off to war. Present day Chelsea thinks she might be dating too many men, while 1940s Chelsea has numerous suitors look her up after they return home from the battlefield.

=== Season 3 (2018–19) ===
No. overall	No. in season	Title	Directed by	Written by	Original release date	Prod. code	U.S. viewers (millions)
31	1	"Hello, Goodbye"	Peter Lauer	Kate Lambert & Katie O'Brien	June 5, 2018	304	0.42
As the new school year starts, Brent takes over as principal, Deb finds a homeless man (Brian Posehn) living in her classroom trailer, Chelsea has to make nice with administrative assistant Mavis upon realizing how much she controls, and Caroline has to learn to live on modest means following her father's arrest on fraud charges. Meanwhile, AJ bids the other teachers farewell, announcing she's taken a job in Amsterdam.
32	2	"All by Myselfie"	Peter Lauer	Kathryn Renée Thomas & Katy Colloton	June 12, 2018	317	0.39
Chelsea tries to get selfies banned in school after learning her former sorority sister fell off a cliff to her death while taking one. Deb deals with a ten-year old in her class who has a pregnancy fetish. Toby returns as a substitute teacher to take over AJ's class, and finds the transition difficult.
33	3	"Of Lice and Men"	Jay Karas	Jamie Lee	June 19, 2018	302	0.35
Chelsea and Deb try in vain to contain a lice outbreak at school. Cecilia reveals she has never learned to drive, so Caroline tries to teach her with help from Toby. Meanwhile, Mary Louise wants to take the next step with Hot Dad, but finds herself caught between her church's teachings and her overwhelming horny feelings.
34	4	"Leggo My Preggo"	Jay Karas	Eliot Glazer	June 26, 2018	306	0.40
Frustrated by mom-to-be groups and all the unwanted advice she is receiving, Deb forms a rebellious new group for pregnant women. Caroline tries to make some extra cash selling a line of cosmetics, and hooks Chelsea into her schemes. Mary Louise deals with feuding divorced parents whose son has been acting up in class. Meanwhile, Cecilia tries to lose weight by taking Chelsea's pills, which make various non-food items taste good.
35	5	"Gender Bender"	Tristram Shapeero	Kate Lambert & Kathryn Renée Thomas	July 10, 2018	319	0.30
With the bus for a field trip short one student, Chelsea and Mary Louise go looking for the girl who has not shown up but wind up waiting for something else. Caroline deals with a young boy's imaginary friend. Meanwhile, Deb unintentionally finds out she's having a girl, and worries about it because she isn't a "pink and princess" kind of person.
36	6	"Wake and Blake"	Todd Biermann	Katie O'Brien & Katy Colloton	July 17, 2018	313	0.35
Mary Louise worries that Hot Dad's son Blake doesn't like her, and her attempts to bond with him only make things worse. Deb has to get her picture taken with a doll that made its way to Fillmore from an elementary school in Japan, leading Caroline and Toby go overboard setting up a photo shoot. Meanwhile, Chelsea accompanies Cecilia on her trip to read to comatose patients in the hospital, and discovers she may have a gift.
37	7	"The Book Challenge"	Tristram Shapeero	Jamie Lee	July 24, 2018	301	0.38
As the school's book fair approaches, Chelsea becomes inspired to be a children's book writer and asks visiting guest C.F. Blinky (Lennon Parham) to be her mentor. Meanwhile, Deb, Caroline and Mary Louise enjoy a little eye candy when they hire three young men from Moving Hunks to move some things around.
38	8	"For Poorer or Poorer"	Jay Karas	Eliot Glazer	July 31, 2018	303	0.33
Caroline finds that options for housing on her own salary are limited. She moves in with Toby, only to learn that they are incompatible roommates. One of Mary Louise's students has a hard time understanding that she has a life outside of school. Meanwhile, Chelsea uses an app to set up a date with a rich "silver fox", but gets catfished by Mavis.
39	9	"Step by Stepsister"	Jay Karas	Alyssa Forleiter	August 7, 2018	307	0.38
Chelsea's mother (Mo Collins) has remarried and now has a young stepdaughter who happens to be in Chelsea's class. Chelsea becomes annoyed and jealous when she sees her new stepsister is being treated better than mom ever treated her. Meanwhile, the school's talent show is approaching, and Cecilia puts some untalented students to work on a skit involving one of her pet causes. Caroline and Toby have major disagreements over a dance routine they are putting together, and later learn it's become symbolic of their relationship.
40	10	"Hot Deadly Dad"	Todd Biermann	Katie O'Brien & Kathryn Renée Thomas	August 14, 2018	305	0.36
With Hot Dad being secretive and frequently leaving the house at night, Mary Louise thinks he may be a serial killer that's in the news. Caroline tries to teach etiquette and manners to a poor, dirty student in her class. Cecilia wears revealing tights to school, thinking she put on leggings. Deb delivers her baby girl.
41	11	"Thoughts and Bears"	Todd Biermann	Katy Colloton & Kathryn Renée Thomas	January 15, 2019	309	0.49
The teachers try to figure out how to deal with a new homeowner (Larry Joe Campbell) who moves his family and pet bear across the street from the school. Meanwhile, Deb returns to work early because she can't stand being home with Damien and the baby. Also, Caroline and Toby have jury duty at the same time, and try to get prospective jurors to rule on who caused their breakup.
42	12	"Operation Egg Drop"	Declan Lowney	Katy Colloton & Kate Lambert	January 22, 2019	310	0.52
After Deb's baby smiles at her, Chelsea decides she wants to freeze some of her eggs. Mary Louise's attempts to use an Alexa-type artificial intelligence device in her classroom backfires. Caroline co-opts one of her student's science projects because she needs a win in her life.
43	13	"Playing the Partum"	Jay Karas	Langan Kingsley	January 29, 2019	308	0.51
An exhausted Deb hires Cecilia as a nanny, then worries that Cecilia wants to take over her life. Chelsea and Mary Louise take a Wilderness Girls troop on a trip to the mall to teach them the dangers of sexism in the wild. Caroline lives vicariously through a rich boy in her class.
44	14	"Sidelined"	Jay Karas	Caitlin Barlow	February 5, 2019	312	0.29
Hot Dad surprises Mary Louise by inviting her prudish parents, John-Paul (Ed Begley Jr.) and Joanna (Alley Mills), for a visit. The horrified Mary Louise then tries to dream up ways to keep her parents from finding out how much her relationship with Hot Dad has progressed. Elsewhere, the other teachers play Fillmore Fantasy League (similar to fantasy football, but with teams of students), and soon find themselves trying to sabotage the outcome for their opponents.
45	15	"Face Your Peers"	Declan Lowney	Alyssa Forleiter	February 12, 2019	315	0.46
Deb takes advantage of an opening with a children's musical group she secretly adores, but then tries to hide her involvement from her colleagues when the group books a gig at Fillmore. Elsewhere, Caroline and Mary Louise intercept a child's note while teaching a combined class. The note makes derogatory remarks about the student's teacher, causing Caroline and Mary Louise to argue over which teacher has been targeted.
46	16	"Relationslut"	Eric Appel	Kate Lambert & Katy Colloton	February 19, 2019	318	0.49
In a reversal of roles, Chelsea helps Caroline get accustomed to the world of "hit it and quit it" dating, while simultaneously realizing she has fallen into a serious relationship with a guy named Kyle (Adam Korson). Meanwhile, Deb and Toby have their students conduct an experiment to demonstrate the effects of bullying, but it backfires due to Cecilia's meddling.
47	17	"The Final Robe"	Eric Appel	Alyssa Forleiter	February 26, 2019	316	0.44
Having given bridesmaid robes to Chelsea, Hot Dad's sister, and a friend from church, Mary Louise has to decide who among Deb, Cecilia and Caroline gets the final two robes. A Bachelorette type of competition ensues. Meanwhile, Caroline learns she has chlamydia.
48	18	"The Tell-Tale Cart"	Todd Biermann	Alyssa Forleiter	March 5, 2019	311	0.53
Shortly after Mary Louise tells Willie the TV cart salesman (Jack McGee) that his product is no longer valued, he passes away, making Mary Louise guilt ridden. Elsewhere, Chelsea and Kyle each try to do something the other wants to do, leading to Kyle taking a pole dancing class and Chelsea getting involved in Kyle's fantasy card game group.
49	19	"Teacher Depreciation Week"	Nancy Hower	Aaron Marvis	March 12, 2019	314	0.42
Budget cuts cause the teachers to take drastic measures just to get supplies for their classes, while an angry PTA group complicates their jobs even further. Meanwhile, Mary Louise starts taking her status as Blake's future stepmother a bit more seriously, which puts her at odds with her fellow teachers. Note : This is the last appearance of Fillmore Elementary School.
50	20	"Wedded Miss"	Nancy Hower	Caitlin Barlow & Kate Lambert	March 19, 2019	320	0.44
In the series finale, Mary Louise is finally marrying Hot Dad, but problems abound. Deb loses Mary Louise's grandma (Cloris Leachman) and later finds her drunk, Chelsea has her face get swollen and red due to an allergic reaction to her spa treatment, Caroline gets emotionally broken after seeing Toby with another girl (even though it is just his lesbian neighbor), and Cecilia gets tased and arrested at a teachers' protest. Meanwhile, Mary Louise's priest seems to have other plans for Hot Dad. In the end, all get ready in time for Mary Louise and Hot Dad to say their vows. Caroline and Toby get back together, but the teachers find out from Cecilia that the rally failed and they are going on strike.

== Reception ==
=== Ratings ===
==== Season 1 (2016) ====
Viewership and ratings per episode of List of Teachers (2016 TV series) episodes
No.	Title	Air date	Rating (18–49)	Viewers (millions)
1	"Pilot"	January 13, 2016	0.28	0.854
2	"Picture Day"	January 20, 2016	0.14	0.392
3	"Duct Duct Goose"	January 27, 2016	0.31	0.988
4	"Hall of Shame"	February 3, 2016	0.17	0.458
5	"Jacob"	February 10, 2016	0.15	0.446
6	"Drunk Kiss"	February 17, 2016	0.13	0.382
7	"Bad Tweeter"	February 24, 2016	0.13	0.434
8	"Sex Ed"	March 2, 2016	0.15	0.426
9	"Hot Lunch"	March 9, 2016	0.1	0.34
10	"The Last Day"	March 16, 2016	0.11	0.344

==== Season 2 (2017–18) ====
Viewership and ratings per episode of List of Teachers (2016 TV series) episodes
No.	Title	Air date	Rating (18–49)	Viewers (millions)
1	"First Day Back"	January 17, 2017	0.14	0.605
2	"Stranger Danger"	January 24, 2017	0.15	0.53
3	"School Sweet School"	January 31, 2017	0.18	0.643
4	"Held Back"	February 7, 2017	0.13	0.516
5	"Snap Judgement"	February 14, 2017	0.15	0.503
6	"Brokebitch Mountain"	February 21, 2017	0.14	0.482
7	"Thirty-One and Done"	February 28, 2017	0.14	0.497
8	"Getting Drilled"	March 7, 2017	0.15	0.477
9	"In Security"	March 14, 2017	0.14	0.535
10	"Lunchtime! The Musical"	March 21, 2017	0.09	0.345
11	"Dosey Don't"	November 7, 2017	0.11	0.47
12	"Passive Eggreesive"	November 14, 2017	0.13	0.621
13	"Dire Straights"	November 21, 2017	0.15	0.574
14	"Nightmare on Fillmore Street"	November 28, 2017	0.1	0.564
15	"Hot Date"	December 5, 2017	0.15	0.65
16	"Let It Flow"	December 12, 2017	0.08	0.462
17	"Third Wheel"	December 19, 2017	0.11	0.521
18	"Toxic Workplace"	January 2, 2018	0.11	0.443
19	"Don't Go Pranking My Heart"	January 9, 2018	0.09	0.434
20	"Labor Pains"	January 16, 2018	0.11	0.492

==== Season 3 (2018–19) ====
Viewership and ratings per episode of List of Teachers (2016 TV series) episodes
No.	Title	Air date	Rating (18–49)	Viewers (millions)
1	"Hello, Goodbye"	June 5, 2018	0.1	0.423
2	"All by Myselfie"	June 12, 2018	0.09	0.389
3	"Of Lice and Men"	June 19, 2018	0.07	0.348
4	"Leggo My Preggo"	June 26, 2018	0.11	0.4
5	"Gender Bender"	July 10, 2018	0.09	0.303
6	"Wake and Blake"	July 17, 2018	0.1	0.349
7	"The Book Challenge"	July 24, 2018	0.09	0.38
8	"For Poorer or Poorer"	July 31, 2018	0.1	0.334
9	"Step by Stepsister"	August 7, 2018	0.1	0.384
10	"Hot Deadly Dad"	August 14, 2018	0.09	0.356
11	"Thoughts and Bears"	January 15, 2019	0.08	0.487
12	"Operation Egg Drop"	January 22, 2019	0.11	0.516
13	"Playing the Partum"	January 29, 2019	0.10	0.513
14	"Sidelined"	February 5, 2019	0.05	0.289
15	"Face Your Peers"	February 12, 2019	0.09	0.462
16	"Relationslut"	February 19, 2019	0.10	0.489
17	"The Final Robe"	February 26, 2019	0.08	0.435
18	"The Tell-Tale Cart"	March 5, 2019	0.09	0.531
19	"Teacher Depreciation Week"	March 12, 2019	0.07	0.415
20	"Wedded Miss"	March 19, 2019	0.07	0.436
