= Nicole Muirbrook =

American model and actress (born 1983)

- Born: March 19, 1983 (age 43)
- Spouse(s): Christian Wagner (divorced) Taylor Sheridan (m. 2013)
- Children: 1
- Modeling information
- Height: 1.77 m (5 ft 9 1/2 in)
- Hair color: Black
- Eye color: Green
- Agency: Next New York

Nicole Muirbrook (born March 19, 1983), formerly Nicole Star Katterborn, is an American model and actress.

== Early life ==
Muirbrook grew up in Salt Lake City, Utah. Her father is James Katter and her mother is Michelle Jane Cole, a former Miss America runner up.

== Career ==
As a model, Muirbrook has appeared on the covers of Vanidades, Vogue Girl, Blush and Bella.

Muirbrook appeared in an episode of the US sitcom How I Met Your Mother with some theorizing that she would eventually play Ted Mosby's Future Wife (something that was eventually proven false). She played Thalia in The Human Contract, which was directed by Jada Pinkett Smith. Her highest profile appearance is in a commercial for Lynx Bullet.

She starred in the 2009 film I Hope They Serve Beer in Hell as Christina.

She is the face model for Nvidia's tech demo, "Medusa".

== Personal life ==
Muirbrook was previously married to film editor Christian Wagner. She married screenwriter Taylor Sheridan in 2013. They reside in Weatherford, Texas and have one son.

== Filmography ==
=== Film ===
Year	Title	Role	Notes
2008	The Human Contract	Thalia	
2009	I Hope They Serve Beer in Hell	Christina	

=== Television ===
Year	Title	Role	Notes
2008	How I Met Your Mother	Woman	Episode: "No Tomorrow"
2009	Dark Blue	Naomi	Episode: "Ice"
