= October Road (TV series) =

American drama television series (2007-2008)

- Genre: Comedy drama
- Created by: André Nemec; Scott Rosenberg; Josh Appelbaum
- Starring: Bryan Greenberg; Laura Prepon; Warren Christie; Geoff Stults; Tom Berenger; Rebecca Field; Brad William Henke; Evan Jones; Jay Paulson; Slade Pearce; Odette Yustman; Lindy Booth
- Composer: Josh Kramon
- Country of origin: United States
- Original language: English
- No. of seasons: 2
- No. of episodes: 19

Production
- Executive producers: André Nemec; Scott Rosenberg; Josh Appelbaum
- Production locations: Knights Ridge, Massachusetts; New York City, New York
- Running time: approx. 41 minutes
- Production companies: Space Floor Television; Mojo Films; Group M Entertainment; ABC Studios

Original release
- Network: ABC
- Release: March 15, 2007 – March 10, 2008

October Road is an American comedy drama television series. It premiered on ABC on March 15, 2007, following Grey's Anatomy. It follows Nick Garrett (played by former One Tree Hill star Bryan Greenberg) who, after a decade, returns to his hometown, the fictional Knights Ridge, Massachusetts. The show takes place in the same world as the 1996 movie Beautiful Girls; both were written by Scott Rosenberg based on his life and friends.

The series is produced by ABC Studios and GroupM Entertainment; the latter is a partnership of media agencies within WPP Group that financed the series in exchange for ABC network-wide advertising time. The show was created by André Nemec, Scott Rosenberg and Josh Appelbaum, who also serve as the series' executive producers.

The second season of October Road premiered on Thursday, November 22, 2007, at 10:00PM Eastern/9:00PM Central.

October Road completed airing its second season on ABC, but was not renewed for a third season.

Upon hearing of the cancellation, the show's creators co-wrote a 10-minute series finale and filmed it with the cast; the finale was released on May 5, 2009, as a special feature on the season 2 DVD.

== Plot ==
Nick Garrett (Bryan Greenberg) left home ten years ago to go backpacking in Europe for a few weeks—and the brief trip ended up lasting a decade. He left behind his girlfriend Hannah (Laura Prepon), best friend Eddie (Geoff Stults), and his family. Garrett is now a famous author and screenwriter living in New York City. Between the parties, social engagements, and living in a beautiful loft-style apartment, Garrett is suffering writer's block while working on his next story. His agent books him to do a one-day writing seminar at the local college in his picturesque hometown of Knights Ridge, Massachusetts. Nick is excited about coming home, but realizes the feeling isn't completely mutual although his family and most of his friends welcome him back effusively. Hannah has a son, Sam, 10, and due to his age Nick questions if the child might be his biological son. Eddie is upset with Nick for walking out on their business plans and for depicting him as a fool in his book. Others are also upset with things Nick wrote in his book about the town. Nick will soon learn that it will be quite a readjustment coming home and that nothing will ever be the same again.

When Nick learns that Sam has a nut allergy like all male members of his family he decides to stay in Knights Ridge and persistently tries to obtain a job at that local college ("The Doof") despite botching the one-day seminar with a bad case of nerves. He eventually wears down the college Dean by pleading for the job on her lawn late at night. She finally relents after he badly sings "Where is Love?" from the musical Oliver!. Nick seeks out the boy, Sam, but backs off when Hannah reproaches him. Nick's father also becomes convinced of Sam's paternity when he sees the boy has similar eyes to those of the widower's late wife.

Nick eventually confronts Hannah with his belief about her boy's paternity. She disputes his view, pointing out how common peanut allergies are by asking patrons at the local bar for a show of hands of those with the allergy. Many people raise their hands. In the next few episodes. Nick and Hannah's feelings continue to develop. Hannah decides to break up with her boyfriend, prompting him to swear revenge on Nick. In the episodes to follow, Hannah's son, Sam, has an allergic reaction to a birthday cake made of nuts. In the tense episode that follows, Nick and Hannah are observed behaving like a couple in love. In the season finale, Nick rushes to her house to proclaim his love for her. They almost kiss, but are interrupted by Sam's supposed biological father.

== Cast and characters ==
=== Regular cast ===
The main characters (Left-to-Right): Phil, Janet, Sam, Eddie, Ray, Hannah, Nick, Bob, Owen, Aubrey, and Ikey.

- Bryan Greenberg as Nicholson "Nick" Garrett:

A young man with plans for the future, a young woman who loves him, amazing friends and loving family. That was Nick Garrett before he left Knights Ridge. He went backpacking through Europe and his brief trip turned into a whole decade away from his hometown. He lived in New York City, where he became a famous author and screenwriter. Experiencing writer's block, Nick decides to conduct a one-day seminar in his hometown, booked by his agent. Returning home, Nick didn't expect all the changes. His girlfriend Hannah Daniels now has a 10-year-old son and is dating his enemy Ray Cataldo. He is troubled by the possibility that Sam could be his son, although Hannah claims Sam's real father is someone else. Nick also has to regain friendships that he broke, most notably with Eddie Latekka, who can't seem to forgive his friend for leaving. After his return, Nick starts dating Aubrey, one of the students at Dufresne College. Nick and Aubrey were in a relationship when the series ended; however, Aubrey had misgivings about it and was seen kissing Nick's brother, Ronnie, at the end of the season finale. In the series finale included with the season 2 DVD, Nick is revealed to be Sam's father and has reconnected with Hannah.

- Laura Prepon as Hannah Jane Daniels:

After her long-time boyfriend Nick Garrett left for a decade to New York City, Hannah was about to deal the hardest time of her life. Ten years later, Nick found Hannah with a 10-year-old child. Hannah, who was dating Nick's enemy Ray Cataldo at the time, had hard time trying to talk to the man who left her years ago. Hannah works as a veterinary technician and some times wonders what her life would have been if she had traveled Europe and attended college. Hannah revealed a different person as Sam's father, but it's still not determined who is Sam's father, though it has been hinted that Eddie might be Sam's father as a result of a one night stand. Hannah's best friend is Janet Meadows. Recently, Hannah broke up with Ray, but they later made up and are now engaged. In the series finale, Hannah stops her wedding to Ray to tell Nick that he is Sam's father; she and Nick are seen to be together seven years later.

- Warren Christie as Ray "Big Cat" Cataldo:

Ray is "The Concrete King" of Knights Ridge. His successful construction company is responsible for office parks, juice bars, and condos all over town. Ray shares custody of his two children, Jasper and Casper with his ex-wife, Christine. Ray's success is a rude awakening for Nick, since as high-schoolers he bullied Nick and his friends as though it were his mission. When Nick returns he finds that Ray is also Hannah's boyfriend. The happy couple was engaged, and the second season ends while their engagement party is going on; however, the series finale opens with Hannah realizing she can't marry and Ray enters her dressing room asking Janet if it was Hannah he saw leaving the house. After the " Seven years later " sign, Ray is nowhere to be seen, and Hannah is clearly in a relationship with Nick.

- Geoff Stults as Eddie Thomas Latekka:

Eddie is a former high-school football star who remains as charming and popular with the women as he was ten years ago. Although he has his own landscaping company, Eddie is still sour that Nick left Knights Ridge and abandoned their dreams of opening a floors, doors, and windows store. While Eddie's dating history has been a revolving door of model-type beauties, he finds himself embarking on a deeper relationship with Janet Meadows, the local barkeep. Nick and Eddie eventually fulfill their dreams of opening up a window shop of the name, "Best Friend Windows". Janet and Eddie's relationship appeared to be over at the end of the second season because she cheated on him with Rooster; however, the series finale shows that they eventually reconciled and married. A series of flashbacks in the episode "Stand Alone By Me," where Eddie is played by Remy Thorne, show that Eddie was much less outgoing as a youngster – it is implied that Eddie began deliberately developing himself into a ladies' man after suffering heartbreak when his long term relationship with Rory Dunlop ends at the end of his high school career.

- Tom Berenger as Bob "The Commander" Garrett:

While sorting out his new life in Knights Ridge, Nick moves in with his gruff but caring father, known as The Commander. A widower, The Commander is dating Leslie Etwood, the dean of the English department at Dufresne College. Bob Garrett has recently received the unfortunate news that he has bone marrow cancer; he is seen to have died sometime between the end of the second season and the series finale, which is set seven years later.

- Rebecca Field as Janet Edith Meadows:

She is a bartender at a well-known bar in Knights Ridge and Hannah Daniels' best friend. During season one, Janet is asked on a date by Eddie Latekka, a man known for sleeping with many attractive women. Despite Eddie's reputation, she gives him a chance. Eddie takes Janet to a restaurant far away and Janet begins to believe he does not wish to be seen with her due to her physical appearance. He assures her that this is not the case and they make plans to attend Alison Rowan's birthday party. Eddie doesn't show as he is doubting what people will think if they saw him with her and Janet's fear that Eddie is ashamed to be seen with her worsens. At the end of the season Janet confronts Eddie at the bar where he apologizes and confesses his true feelings for her. He kisses her and leaves the bar while Janet does a "happy twirl." Janet and Eddie were in a steady relationship until she cheated on him with Rooster, after which Eddie angrily broke up with her; however, the two had reconciled by the time of the series finale seven years afterward and are married.

- Brad William Henke as Owen Dennis Rowan:

Big-hearted and affable, Owen prides himself on being a good husband and father to his two children. He always thought his life was perfect with a stable job, a pretty wife, and great friends. After finding out about his wife's affair with his childhood pal, Ikey, Owen's outlook becomes grim, as he doubts if his life will ever be the same. The process of getting over his parted wife and ex-best friend has not been easy. The one woman Owen connected with after the separation eventually admitted to him that she was a lesbian. Owen is not seen in the series finale, and as such, the fate of his marriage remains unknown.

- Evan Jones as David "Ikey" Eichorn:

Ikey's affair with Owen's wife has divided this once close-knit group. A traitor in the eyes of his friend, Ikey loses his job working for Eddie's landscaping company and discovers the path of redemption is going to be a long, rough road. Seeking acceptance and a job, Ikey decides to work for Ray Cataldo's construction company. Ikey took Eddie to the hospital after his beating and was kindly accepted back into the circle of friends.

- Jay Paulson as Philip "Physical Phil" Farmer:

A shut-in for the past six years, Physical Phil watches the world from the comfort of his living room in the house he shares with Eddie Latekka. Although much of Knights Ridge considers him a freak, his friends know Physical Phil is as reliable as they come. He got his nickname from Ikey at the age of 10, when Owen broke up an impending fistfight by saying "Don't get physical with Phil." His pizza-delivering girlfriend is one of the few outsiders he lets into his world, and she is responsible for his first steps outside his house. Physical Phil and Pizza Girl were in a relationship for most of the program's run; the series finale shows that they are still together seven years later and that Phil eventually overcomes his fear of leaving his house.

- Slade Pearce as Sam Daniels:

Sam Daniels is Hannah's precocious ten-year-old son. Sam and Nick quickly formed a bond upon Nick's return to Knights Ridge. He has a tight bond with his mom, and is adjusting to living with Ray and his two sons, Jasper and Casper. Sam believes his father is Gavin Goddard. In the series finale, Nick is revealed to be Sam's father; the finale appears to show that Nick, Hannah, and Sam began living as a family sometime after the end of the second season.

- Odette Yustman as Aubrey Diaz:

A Berkeley, California native, Aubrey Diaz moved to Knights Ridge to attend Dufresne College's graduate writing program. Aubrey is talented, beautiful, and intrigued by her professor, Nick Garrett. After a brief period of flirting and dating, Nick broke Aubrey's heart when he chose to declare his feeling for Hannah. The two have grown closer overtime and realized they both want more. Aubrey and Nick were in a relationship at the end of the second season; however, in the season finale, she began having misgivings about it and was seen kissing Nick's brother, Ronnie, shortly before the episode ended. The two embarked on a relationship of their own at some point after the program's cancellation; the series finale, set seven years in the future, shows Aubrey pregnant with Ronnie's child.

- Lindy Booth as Emily the "Pizza Girl":

Emily, known for the series's entire run as simply "Pizza Girl," is Physical Phil's colorful and energetic girlfriend. She attends Dufresne College and works, as her name implies, as a pizza delivery girl; it was this job that first brought her in contact with her shut-in boyfriend. Their relationship suffered a number of bumps, including Phil's parents not accepting her as his girlfriend, but the two are shown to still be together seven years later in the series finale, which is also the episode which finally reveals Emily's first name.

=== Recurring cast ===
- Jonathan Murphy as Ronnie Garrett
- Elizabeth Bogush as Alison Rowan
- Penny Johnson Jerald as Leslie Etwood
- Sean Gunn as Vincent "Rooster" Russo
- James Keane as Sully
- Bo Mitchell as Doodie
- Christopher Eric Tschupp as Matt Lauche
- Destiny Whitlock as Caitlin Rowan
- Bryce Robinson as Connor Rowan
- Tanner Blaze as Casper Cataldo
- Brandon Killham as Jasper Cataldo
- Tara Ansley as Taylor
- Bill Bellamy as Stratton Lorb
- Julie Ann Emery as Christine Cataldo
- Judy Leavell as Ikey's Mom
- Amy Acker as Jenny Bristol
- Armand Assante as Gabriel Diaz

=== Guest appearances ===
- Bella Thorne as Angela Ferilli
- Remy Thorne as Young Eddie
- Zach Mills as Young Nick
- Haley Pullos as Kelly Harper
- Alex Biats as Young Owen
- Joey Luthman as Young Physical Phil
- Matthew Josten as Young Ikey
- Cameron Palatas as Young Ray "Big Cat" Cataldo
- Bridger Zadina as Young Grizzly
- Brien Perry as Rob Bear

== Production ==
Portions of the show were filmed at Agnes Scott College in Decatur, Georgia, in Newnan, Georgia, in Madison, Georgia, and Grant Park, Atlanta.

Elements of Scott Rosenberg's 2001–2002 show Going to California were recycled; Evan Jones again played a character named "Ikey"; "Eddie Latekka" reappeared but was played by Geoff Stults; "Baggo" was referenced but unseen, while Brad William Henke and Sean Gunn played new characters. The boys' childhood friend Angela Ferilli moved to the town of Bishop Flats (where Going to California was set), which they then visited and which was said to be 'three towns over' from Knights Ridge.

== Episodes ==
=== Series overview ===
Season	Episodes	Originally released	
Season	Episodes	First released	Last released
1	6	March 15, 2007	April 26, 2007
2	13	November 22, 2007	March 10, 2008

=== Season 1 (2007) ===
No. overall	No. in season	Title	Directed by	Written by	Original release date	Prod. code
1	1	"Pilot"	Gary Fleder	André Nemec, Scott Rosenberg & Josh Appelbaum	March 15, 2007	101
10 years after leaving his hometown, Nick Garrett returns to Knights Ridge, to teach a one-day course at Dufresne College, which he believes is a great way to find out what changes since he was gone. After hurting the ones he loved by writing a book, a best-selling novel, and discovering their secrets, Nick will have to find a way to confront past demons and move on with his life. Nick decides to stay after discovering that his ex-girlfriend, Hannah Daniels, has a 10-year-old son named Sam who has a peanut allergy (just like all of the men in the Garrett family).
2	2	"The Pros and Cons of Upsetting the Applecart"	Gary Fleder	André Nemec, Scott Rosenberg & Josh Appelbaum	March 22, 2007	102
Nick decides to stay in Knights Ridge and tries to convince dean Leslie Etwood to give him a job at the local college, but things keep getting in his way. In a way to get back at Nick for leaving years ago, Eddie pursues Aubrey. Ikey isn't pleased to see Alison and Owen on an annual date. Hannah is mad at Nick after realizing that Nick's father came into Veterinary Care with Hannah's cat (claiming it's his) just so he could get a good look at Sam. Later on, he tells Nick that Sam has Nick's late mothers' eyes. Nick confronts Hannah about the peanut allergy, and she responds with detailed information on Sam's alleged biological father. Eddie fails at impressing Aubrey with his talking racoon story, and ends up awkwardly asking Janet on a date. Janet has to think about it.
3	3	"Tomorrow's So Far Away"	Gary Fleder	Victoria Strouse	March 29, 2007	103
Nick helps Sam try to get a girl he likes by using a technique from his novel - the same technique he used on Hannah when they were 16. Ikey continues the affair with Owen's wife. Physical Phil admits his crush on a pizza delivery girl, and confesses he'd like to ask her "in". While on their date, Janet thinks Eddie is too embarrassed to be seen with her in public. Hannah breaks up with "Big Cat". The episode ends with Hannah sitting at Nick's mother's grave (Caroline Garrett) talking to her about a boy needing his father.
4	4	"Secrets and Guys"	Michael Schultz	André Nemec, Scott Rosenberg & Josh Appelbaum	April 5, 2007	104
Hannah and Janet send Sam on a secret mission that leads to a tragic conclusion; Ronnie and Nick find out The Commander's secret; Ikey and Eddie are angry when they find out Big Cat has been stealing their clients; and Physical Phil plans a date with the pizza girl.
5	5	"Forever Until Now"	David Paymer	André Nemec, Scott Rosenberg & Josh Appelbaum	April 19, 2007	105
Nick and Hannah bond while waiting for the outcome of Sam's surgery. Eddie tries to deal with the consequences of standing Janet up at their date. Ikey and Alison come to an agreement about their secret relationship. Physical Phil has to find a way to get even with the drunken frat guys that bothered Pizza Girl.
6	6	"Best Friend Windows"	Gary Fleder	André Nemec, Scott Rosenberg & Josh Appelbaum	April 26, 2007	106
Nick is torn between Hannah and Aubrey, as Aubrey asks him to choose between the two of them. However, an unexpected visitor occupies Nick. Eddie makes a weird response to a "welcome surprise" by his friends. Physical Phil decides to make a huge change in his life. Ray tells Owen about Alison and Ikey's secret relationship.

=== Season 2 (2007–08) ===
No. overall	No. in season	Title	Directed by	Written by	Original release date	Prod. code
7	1	"Let's Get Owen"	Gary Fleder	André Nemec, Scott Rosenberg & Josh Appelbaum	November 22, 2007	201
Nick and Eddie head to New York in an attempt to bring Owen back to his estranged wife and family in Knightsridge, and Hannah comes to terms with her true feelings for Nick.
8	2	"How to Kiss Hello"	Nick Marck	Becky Hartman Edwards	November 26, 2007	202
Upon Nick's return, Hannah shares her feelings with him. Meanwhile, Eddie wrestles with expressing his feelings publicly for Janet, Nick is threatened by another professor's interest in Aubrey, and Physical Phil's only lifeline to the outside world is jeopardized.
9	3	"The Infidelity Tour"	Sandy Smolan	Stacy Rukeyser	December 3, 2007	203
In an attempt to get over his pain and move on, Owen employs Nick to learn the details of his wife's affair with his best friend, Ikey. Meanwhile Eddie harbors a secret that could kill a business venture he plans with Nick, and Sam struggles to accept his mother's getting married.
10	4	"Deck the Howls"	Sarah Pia Anderson	Victoria Strouse	December 10, 2007	205
A surprising event occurs when the estranged Owen and Alison try to figure out how to split time with their kids during Christmas. Meanwhile Phil lies to his visiting parents, claiming that he's an architect, which upsets his girlfriend; Janet gives Eddie a deeply personal gift, which freaks him out; and Nick learns the truth about his deceased mother.
11	5	"Once Around the Block"	David Paymer	Phil M. Rosenberg & Luke McMullen	December 17, 2007	204
Ray's ex-wife, Christine, a successful surgeon, chastises Hannah for allowing her old hippy friend to watch her sons while Hannah takes a veterinary tech exam. Meanwhile Nick sets up Ronnie with a friend of Aubrey's on a group night out, but Ronnie realizes he's in love with Aubrey, and Pizza Girl begs Physical Phil to take the classic car he stores in his garage outdoors for a spin.
12	6	"Revenge of the Cupcake Kid"	Andrew Bernstein	Bryan Oh	January 7, 2008	206
An amateur comic book Nick wrote back in high school ridiculing a classmate comes back to haunt him in the present when Nick and Eddie are bidding on a lucrative new project and the man hiring is the "Cupcake Kid." Meanwhile, Hannah and Janet plan a double date that is foiled by their boyfriends.
13	7	"Spelling It Out"	John Kretchmer	Scott Rosenberg & Becky Hartman Edwards	January 14, 2008	207
Nick becomes suspicious that Aubrey is hiding something from him after she's overheard making a mysterious phone call; Ray tells Hannah he wants to adopt Sam, which makes her uneasy; Janet is upset that she and Eddie have not yet been intimate; and Knightsridge town is rooting for a shoo-in for the annual regional spelling bee.
14	8	"Dancing Days Are Here Again"	David Paymer	Stacy Rukeyser	January 21, 2008	208
Nick discovers that Aubrey is meeting secretly with her estranged father, Ray tries to get Hannah to commit to letting him adopt her son, Sam, Alison and Owen date other people, and the Commander discovers he has a health issue.
15	9	"We Lived Like Giants"	Marcos Siega	Victoria Strouse	February 11, 2008	209
Owen, Nick, Ronnie, Aubrey, Gabriel and the Commander take a road trip to find the girl who saved Owen's life, and The Commander uses the opportunity to remind his sons of their childhood, and to finally be able to tell them about his condition. Nick encourages Gabriel to tell the truth about his upcoming departure to his daughter.
16	10	"Hat? No Hat?"	Bethany Rooney	Jeff Pinkner	February 18, 2008	210
Hannah is troubled when her parents visit to help her prepare for her wedding. Nick learns he's broke. Owen goes out on a date with Jenny, the girl who saved his life.
17	11	"Stand Alone By Me"	Sandy Smolan	Scott Rosenberg & Phil M. Rosenberg	March 3, 2008	211
While Nick, Phil, Owen and Eddie have problems with the women in their lives, they learn of the untimely death of their childhood crush.
18	12	"The Fine Art of Surfacing"	David Solomon	Bryan Oh	March 10, 2008	212
A visit from Eddie's former girlfriend sends Janet into a panic, Hannah is arrested, and Nick is offered a terrific career move.
19	13	"As Soon as You Are Able"	Gary Fleder	André Nemec, Scott Rosenberg & Josh Appelbaum	March 10, 2008	213
Hannah's arrest has a huge effect on her relationship with Ray. Nick has to decide if he wants to leave Knights Ridge again for a good job opportunity.

== Ratings ==
The show debuted to strong initial ratings, but fell 16% in its second episode, though its ratings were still substantially higher than Men in Trees, the show it replaced upon its first-season conclusion.

It lost some of its audience during the last episode from a 3.7 rating to a 3.3 rating.

ABC originally planned on airing only four episodes of the series, leaving two episodes to be part of a second season. The network revised these plans on April 2, 2007, and the last episode of season one aired on April 26, 2007.

October Road was renewed for a second season on May 11, 2007. The new season order was of 13 episodes, which could be extended to a full 22-episode season based on ratings. The new season saw Lindy Booth and Rebecca Field made cast members.

Seasonal rankings (based on average total viewers per episode) of October Road on ABC:

The overall ratings for the first season—all episodes airing at 10:00 PM on Thursdays—were Rank #38, and 10.5 million viewers.

Weekly rankings based on Fast National ratings.Season 1
Episode	Title	Air Date	Rating	Share	18–49	Viewers	Rank
1×01	"Pilot"	March 15, 2007^{†}	9.7	16	5.8	13.93	# 9
1×02	"The Pros and Cons of Upsetting the Applecart"	March 22, 2007^{†}	8.3	14	4.9	11.5	# 20
1×03	"Tomorrow's So Far Away"	March 29, 2007	5.7	10	3.5	8.24	# 39
1×04	"Secrets and Guys"	April 5, 2007	5.2	9	3.0	7.68	# 42
1×05	"Forever. Until Now"	April 19, 2007^{†}	6.7	11	4.2	9.6	# 24
1×06	"Best Friend Windows"	April 26, 2007^{†}	6.1	11	4.2	10.2	# 36

Season 2
Episode	Title	Air Date	Rating	Share	18–49	Viewers	Rank
2×01	"Let's Get Owen"	November 22, 2007	?	9	2.0	6.36	#1
2×02	"How to Kiss Hello"	November 26, 2007	4.5	7	2.8	6.02	?
2×03	"The Infidelity Tour"	December 3, 2007	3.7	5	2.2	5.26	?
2×04	"Deck the Howls"	December 10, 2007	3.8	5	2.2	5.19	?
2×05	"Once Around the Block"	December 17, 2007	3.3	4	1.5	5.68	?
2×06	"Revenge of the Cupcake Kid"	January 7, 2008	3.5	4	1.8	5.00	?
2×07	"Spelling It Out"	January 14, 2008	3.4	5	2.0	4.89	?
2×08	"Dancing Days Are Here Again"	January 21, 2008	3.2	?	1.9	4.95	?
2×09	"We Lived Like Giants"	February 11, 2008	2.6	?	1.6	4.00	?
2×10	"Hat? No Hat?"	February 18, 2008	3.1	?	1.6	4.42	?
2×11	"Stand Alone By Me"	March 3, 2008	3.8	5	2.0	5.30	?
2×12	"The Fine Art of Surfacing"	March 10, 2008	3.4	?	1.8	4.70	?
2×13	"As Soon As You Are Able"	March 10, 2008	3.4	?	2.8	4.70	?

^{†}Episode aired after a new Grey's Anatomy, which on the night of October Road's pilot averaged 22.7 million viewers.

^{‡}Monday night episodes.

=== Seasonal ratings ===
Seasons
Season	Rating	Share	18–49	Viewers	Rank
"Season 1"	7.0	12	4.3	10.19	#28
"Season 2"	3.5	6	2.0	5.11	?

== DVD releases ==
DVD name	Release date	# Eps	Additional information
The Complete First Season	October 30, 2007	6	Deleted scenes, bloopers, "The Journey Begins" featurette, season 2 preview.
The Complete Second and Final Season	May 5, 2009	13	10-minute series finale
