= The Human Contract =

- Directed by: Jada Pinkett Smith
- Written by: Jada Pinkett Smith
- Produced by: Dawn Thomas; Miguel Melendez; Mike Jackson
- Starring: Jason Clarke; Paz Vega; Idris Elba; Jada Pinkett Smith; T.J. Thyne; Joanna Cassidy; Ted Danson
- Cinematography: Darren Genet
- Edited by: Michael Trent
- Music by: The Graves Brothers; Anthony Marinelli
- Distributed by: Overbrook Entertainment
- Release dates: October 28, 2008 (Chicago International Film Festival); June 30, 2009 (United States)
- Country: United States
- Language: English

The Human Contract is a 2008 drama film written and directed by Jada Pinkett Smith, starring Jason Clarke and Paz Vega. The DVD was released on 30 June 2009. This is Jada Pinkett Smith's directorial debut.

== Plot ==
A successful but unhappy businessman (Clarke), meets a free-spirited stranger (Vega) who tempts him to explore reckless love.

== Cast ==
- Jason Clarke as Julian Wright, a successful but unhappy businessman
- Paz Vega as Michael, a free-spirited, mysterious and married beauty whom he falls in love with
- Ted Danson as E.J Winters
- Idris Elba as Larry, Julian's friend
- Jada Pinkett Smith as Rita, Julian's sister
- Nicole Muirbrook Wagner as Thalia
- Titus Welliver as Praylis
- T.J. Thyne as Greg
- Joanna Cassidy as Rose
- Steven Brand as Boyd
- Tessa Thompson as Waitress
- Anne Ramsay as Cheryl

== Production ==
Filming took place in Los Angeles starting the week of November 11, 2007.
