= Brandon Killham =

American actor (born 1997)

- Born: December 30, 1997 (age 28); Phoenix, Arizona, United States
- Occupation: Actor

Brandon Killham (born December 30, 1997) is an American actor perhaps best known for his portrayal of the younger Don Draper (known by his real name Dick Whitman at that time) on the television series Mad Men. Killham has also appeared in such films and television series as My Name Is Earl, Arrested Development, October Road, Two and a Half Men, Things You Don't Tell... and Dexter.
