= I Hope They Serve Beer in Hell (film) =

2009 American independent comedy film

I Hope They Serve Beer In Hell
- Theatrical release poster
- Directed by: Bob Gosse
- Written by: Tucker Max; Nils Parker
- Based on: I Hope They Serve Beer in Hell by Tucker Max
- Produced by: Tucker Max; Richard Kelly; Nils Parker; Sean McKittrick; Aaron Ray; Karen Firestone; Max Wong; Ted Hamm
- Starring: Matt Czuchry; Jesse Bradford; Geoff Stults; Keri Lynn Pratt; Marika Dominczyk
- Cinematography: Suki Medencevic
- Edited by: Jeff Kushner
- Music by: James L. Venable
- Distributed by: Freestyle Releasing
- Release date: September 25, 2009
- Running time: 105 minutes
- Country: United States
- Language: English
- Box office: $1.4 million

I Hope They Serve Beer in Hell is a 2009 American independent comedy film loosely based on the work and persona of writer Tucker Max, who co-wrote the screenplay. In an interview with Shave Magazine Max explained that the film is not "a direct recount or retelling. It says it is based on true events because it is. Basically, every scene in the movie happened in real life in one way or another but it happened in a different time or time frame. But pretty much every single thing happened." The film was directed by Bob Gosse and stars Matt Czuchry as Max. It was produced by Darko Entertainment and distributed by Freestyle Releasing. Max had said previously that sequels were possible if the initial film found financial success.

The film was released in theaters on September 25, 2009. The DVD was released on January 26, 2010. While the book was a best-seller, the film was a box office bomb that was met with generally negative reviews.

== Plot summary ==
The film's plot is loosely adapted from "The Austin Road Trip Story" in Max's book I Hope They Serve Beer in Hell. A tireless and charismatic novelty seeker, Tucker tricks his buddy Dan into lying to his fiancée Kristy, so they can go to a legendary strip club three and a half hours away to celebrate Dan's last days of bachelorhood in proper style. Tucker drags their misanthropic friend Drew along for the ride, and before they know it Tucker's pursuit of a hilarious carnal interest lands Dan in serious trouble with both the law and his future wife.

The ensuing argument leaves Tucker uninvited from the wedding. To attend the wedding and maintain his relationships with his friends, Tucker must address his personal behavior and priorities.

== Principal cast ==
- Matt Czuchry as Tucker Max
- Jesse Bradford as Drew
- Geoff Stults as Dan
- Keri Lynn Pratt as Kristy
- Marika Dominczyk as Lara
- Nicole Muirbrook as Christina
- Traci Lords as Connie
- Paul Wall as Grillionaire
- Derek Wayne Johnson as Friend #2
- Melissa Fumero as Melissa

Denise Quiñones was originally cast as Lara, but dropped out two days before filming started. Dominczyk, who had been the original first choice for the role but had passed due to a scheduling conflict, was now available and stepped in immediately

The film includes cameo appearances from UFC fighters Forrest Griffin and Mac Danzig; rapper Paul Wall; Fark.com founder Drew Curtis, author Timothy Ferriss, and the real-life Tucker Max (playing Dan's older brother Jeff). Producer/writer Nils Parker also has a small cameo, playing an announcer in the strip club.

== Production ==
In 2008, it was announced that Richard Kelly's Darko Entertainment had signed on to finance and produce an adaptation of Tucker Max's best selling novel, I Hope They Serve Beer in Hell.

== Reception ==
The film received generally negative reviews. As of July 2020, 20% of the 35 reviews compiled on Rotten Tomatoes are positive, with an average rating of 3.19/10. The review consensus from Rotten Tomatoes was: "I Hope They Serve Beer in Hell fails in its attempts at raunchy humor, and Tucker Max comes across so unlikable and outrageous that the film's inevitable story arc feels forced." Metacritic, which uses a weighted average, assigned the film a score of 26 out of 100, based on 15 critics, indicating "generally unfavorable" reviews.

Numerous critics considered the movie to be one of the worst of the year.

== Box office ==
Opening weekend gross was $366,900 on 120 screens. Its total domestic gross was $1.4 million. Max blamed the movie's box office failure on the marketing of the movie.

In 2016, Max described the movie as "a big failure, probably my biggest and most personal ever", and blamed himself:

[I]t failed mainly because of my bad decisions, and all of those decisions were ultimately driven by my deep identity and emotional issues.

— Tucker Max

== Controversy ==
In 2009, during the pre-release promotional period for the movie, several publications accused Max of rape and of promoting rape culture by allegedly glamorizing the practice of engaging in sex acts with women who are intoxicated. In addition, protests were staged at screenings of the movie by demonstrators who argued that intoxication precludes a woman from consenting to sex, and thus Max's stories and movie include descriptions of acts that "meet the legal definition of rape in North Carolina." In 2012, writing in his book Trust Me, I'm Lying, Max's marketer Ryan Holiday claimed that the controversy was a publicity stunt fabricated and spread by Holiday to create interest in the film.
