= Assholes Finish First =

2010 book by Tucker Max

- Author: Tucker Max
- Language: English
- Genre: Non-fiction / Fratire
- Publisher: Simon & Schuster
- Publication date: September 28, 2010
- Publication place: United States
- Pages: 416
- ISBN: 1-4169-3874-5
- Preceded by: I Hope They Serve Beer In Hell
- Followed by: Hilarity Ensues

Assholes Finish First is a book by Tucker Max, detailing anecdotal stories, usually revolving around drinking and sex. It is the sequel to I Hope They Serve Beer in Hell. The title is a parody of and corollary to the saying "Nice guys finish last," a frequent misquotation of Leo Durocher's statement "Nice guys; finish last," which was itself a 1975 misquotation by Durocher of his statement 29 years earlier about the 1946 baseball New York Giants.

The book debuted at Number 3 on The New York Times Best Seller list for hardcover nonfiction on October 17, 2010, and remained on the list for 14 consecutive weeks.
