= Jay Martel =

American comedy writer

Jay Martel is an American comedy writer of screenplays, novels, plays and essays. He has won Emmy, Peabody, Writers Guild of America, and American Comedy awards for his writing.

Martel's first novel, the science-fiction comedy "Channel Blue" (published in 2014 by Head of Zeus), is currently being developed by Paramount as a feature. His other novels include The Present and Time Enough, published by Audible in 2021 and 2022.

In TV, he was co-showrunner and head writer on the sketch show Key & Peele and has worked on many other comedy series, including Alternatino With Arturo Castro, Teachers, Halfway Home, and Strangers With Candy.

He has also worked with Michael Moore on TV Nation, The Awful Truth, and on the movie, Fahrenheit 911.

In movies, he co-wrote the screenplay for Get Hard. He wrote the screenplay for The Present, based on his novel, which starred Greg Kinnear and Isla Fisher, and is currently streaming on Hulu.

In addition to his career as a writer and producer, Martel is also a father and has a son named Julian Martel.
