= Tucker Max =

American internet personality, blogger and author (born 1975)

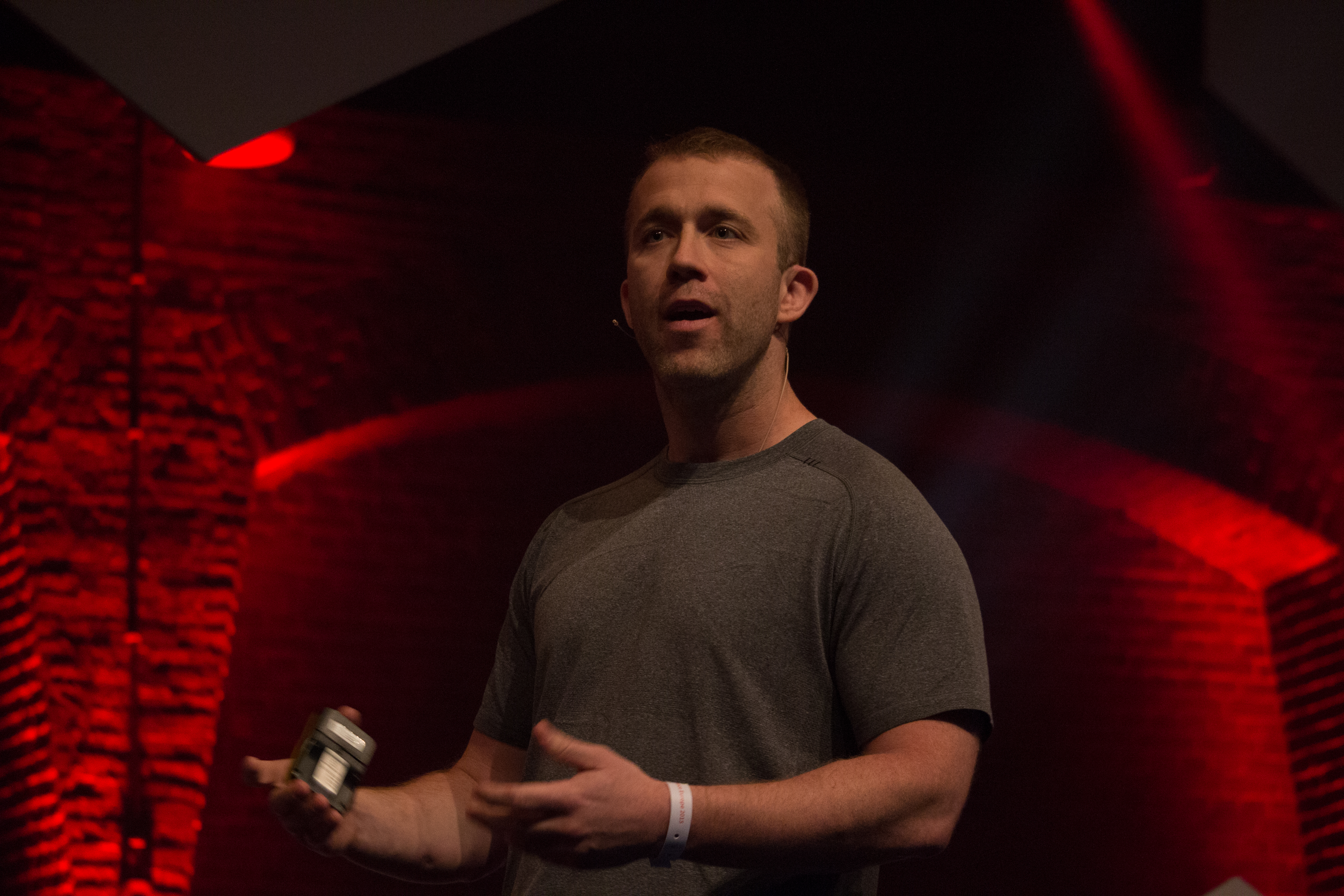
- Max giving a talk at the TNW Conference in Amsterdam
- Born: September 27, 1975 (age 51); Atlanta, Georgia, U.S.
- Education: University of Chicago (BA); Duke University (JD)
- Occupations: Writer and founder of Scribe Media
- Children: 4
- Writing career
- Genres: Comedy, non-fiction
- Notable works: I Hope They Serve Beer in Hell; Assholes Finish First; Hilarity Ensues; Sloppy Seconds: The Tucker Max Leftovers
- Website: tuckermax.com

Tucker Max (born September 27, 1975) is an American author and public speaker. He chronicles his drinking and sexual encounters in the form of short stories on his website TuckerMax.com, which has received millions of visitors since Max launched it as the result of a bet in 2000.

I Hope They Serve Beer in Hell was a New York Times #1 Bestseller and made the Best Seller List each year from 2006 to 2012. It has sold over one million copies worldwide, including 400,000 copies in 2009. His book was subsequently made into a feature film of the same title, which received generally negative reviews and numerous critics considered to be one of the worst films of the year. In 2010, he released a book titled Assholes Finish First, and in 2012 released the books Hilarity Ensues and Sloppy Seconds: The Tucker Max Leftovers. He was a 2009 Time 100 finalist based on internet votes, although he did not make the magazine list.

== Early life and education ==
Tucker Max's father, Dennis Max, is a restaurant owner in South Florida. According to Max, his parents met at "one of George Jung's coke parties in Manhattan Beach". Tucker's grandmother was Jewish. Tucker grew up in Lexington, Kentucky and graduated from Blair Academy in 1995, where he was voted "most egotistical". He graduated from the University of Chicago in three years, with a B.A. in Law, Letters, and Society in 1998. He attended Duke Law School on an academic scholarship, earning a J.D. in 2001.

== Personal life ==
Max resides with his wife, Veronica, and four children near Austin, Texas.

== Career ==
Max began his career by publishing The Definitive Book of Pick-Up Lines (2001), which he followed up by Belligerence and Debauchery: The Tucker Max Stories (2003). He was the facilitator of the website "Tard Blog", from 2002 to 2003. In 2006, he began development of a television pilot for Comedy Central, but the project was canceled reportedly due to a dispute with Sony about feature film rights. His first New York Times Best Seller, I Hope They Serve Beer in Hell, was released in 2006.

In September 2006, Simon Spotlight Publishing, a division of Simon & Schuster, announced that Max was contracted to release a book in January 2008, Assholes Finish First. Undisclosed delays pushed the release date to September 2010. He reportedly received a $300,000 advance for Assholes Finish First, and released a revised and expanded edition of I Hope They Serve Beer in Hell in January 2009.

In 2008, The Hollywood Reporter announced that Max was producing a movie based on his bestselling book, also titled I Hope They Serve Beer in Hell. He detailed the process on a production blog hosted on the movie's website. Actor Matt Czuchry (The Good Wife) portrayed Max in the film. The film was panned by critics and earned $1.4 million at the box office on a $7 million budget. Max attributed the poor box office performance of the film to oversights in marketing, but expressed hope it would find an audience on DVD. In 2011, he was a guest speaker at the Ancestral Health Symposium, giving a presentation entitled From cave to cage: Mixed martial arts in ancestral health.

In January 2012, Max claimed he was leaving behind the lifestyle he had described in his books and that he had been in psychotherapy. In February 2012 a publicity campaign for his book Hilarity Ensues led to his account with the company Sponsored Tweets being banned for "ethics violations".

Starting summer 2014, Max began collaborating with Geoffrey Miller, an evolutionary psychology professor at the University of New Mexico. Together with Miller, Tucker created a podcast called The Mating Grounds. In September 2015, Max and Miller released Mate: Become the Man Women Want, an advice book about men's sexual strategies published by Little, Brown and Company.

Scribe Media was founded along with startup founder Zach Obront in August 2014. In November 2014, Max published his experience of working with Melissa Gonzalez, CEO of the Lionesque Group for her book The Pop-Up Paradigm – the first project of his company Scribe Media. Scribe Media writes and publishes books for entrepreneurs who wish to have their own book but don't have the time or expertise to write it in the conventional way. After launching Scribe Media, Max hired J. T. McCormick to serve as CEO in his place. In December 2021, Max stepped away from Scribe Media.

As part of his work with Scribe Media to help authors write and publish books, Tucker Max published The Scribe Method on May 7, 2019. The book is about helping authors overcome their fears, structure their writing process, and use their books effectively.

In 2017, Max ghostwrote Tiffany Haddish's memoir, The Last Black Unicorn, which was released in December 2017 by Simon & Schuster and debuted at number 15 on The New York Times best-seller list.

=== Fratire ===
Max, along with George Ouzounian (known more commonly by his pen name, Maddox), is considered a founding author of the 21st-century literary genre "fratire". The term, combining fraternity and satire, was introduced by The New York Times reporter Warren St. John in a 2006 article titled Dude, Here's My Book. The genre is characterized by masculine themes and could be considered the male equivalent of chick lit. Both Max and Maddox dislike the label, pointing out that neither of them were ever in fraternities. In the final chapter of Hilarity Ensues, and in a post on his website, Max announced he has retired from writing fratire, explaining:

Over the last couple years, I've realized that I don't do all the funny but stupid shit I did when I was 25 anymore, and I find myself writing about the way my life used to be. I'm not the same person I was when I started writing these stories, and I don't live the same life I did then—so it no longer makes sense for me to keep writing that way.

In the same chapter, Max stated that he is currently working on an "advice book" (alongside Nils Parker, co-writer of the I Hope They Serve Beer in Hell screenplay), as well as other undisclosed projects.

== Controversies ==
In 2003, Max posted on his website an account of his relationship with Katy Johnson, who was Miss Vermont in 1999. Johnson filed a lawsuit claiming, among other things, invasion of her privacy. In response to the lawsuit, a Florida state court judge issued an order for Max not to write about Johnson; not to use Johnson's first, full, or last name; not to use the phrase "Miss Vermont" on his website; and not to disclose any "information" or "stories" about Johnson. Some legal experts called the decision "kooky" and "clearly a suppression of free speech". The ACLU intervened, filing an amicus brief, claiming a breach of Max's First Amendment rights, which led to Johnson voluntarily withdrawing her lawsuit, and Max's story was once again posted on his website. An expanded version of the story was later published in Hilarity Ensues.

In January 2006, Max posted a thread on his message board satirizing Anthony DiMeo, a young Philadelphia resident, for throwing a New Year's Eve party that was a disaster. The number of young partygoers showing up greatly exceeded expectations, which resulted in the food and alcohol running out well before midnight. The more than 700 partygoers got unruly, two pieces of art were stolen, and city police were called in to disperse the crowd. DiMeo sued Max under the Violence Against Women Act claiming some comments on Max's message board were libelous and represented criminal behavior. The lawsuit was subsequently dismissed under the Communications Decency Act, with U.S. District Judge Stewart Dalzell noting that although Max could be a "poster child for vulgarity", the law must protect "the coarse conversation that, it appears, never ends on TuckerMax.com."

In May 2009, Max held a speaking engagement which was picketed by a feminist group at Ohio State University, who claimed that his writing "promoted a culture of rape." In August 2009, the North Carolina State University Women's Center held a silent protest of I Hope They Serve Beer in Hell. The advertisements themselves were also vandalized in multiple cities. In his book Trust Me, I'm Lying, marketer (and personal friend of Tucker Max) Ryan Holiday claimed to have defaced some movie posters himself, as a publicity stunt to get media attention for the movie.

For three years starting in 2005, Max was harassed by a man named Justin Massler, who sent him repeated "Unabomber type" emails, and showed up uninvited to a 2006 party hosted by Max while dressed up as a superhero. The altercations made national news after Massler was charged with stalking Ivanka Trump in 2010.

In 2012, hoping to offset a part of his owed taxes in a way that also provided self-promotion, Max reportedly offered to donate $500,000 to Planned Parenthood if they named an abortion clinic after him. Planned Parenthood declined.

== Bibliography ==
- The Definitive Book of Pick-Up Lines (2001)
- Belligerence and Debauchery: The Tucker Max Stories (2003)
- I Hope They Serve Beer in Hell (2006) ISBN 0-8065-3106-1
- Assholes Finish First (2010) ISBN 1-4169-3874-5
- Hilarity Ensues (2012) ISBN 1-4516-6903-8
- Sloppy Seconds: The Tucker Max Leftovers (2012)
- Mate: Become the Man Women Want, with Geoffrey Miller (2015)
- The Last Black Unicorn (2017) ISBN 978-1-501-18182-5 Ghostwritten memoir by Tiffany Haddish

== Filmography ==
Year	Film	Role
2009	I Hope They Serve Beer in Hell	Producer, writer (co-written with Nils Parker)
