= The Alphabet of Manliness =

Book by George Ouzounian

- First edition cover
- Author: Maddox
- Language: English
- Publisher: Kensington, Penguin
- Publication date: 2006
- Publication place: United States
- Pages: 224
- ISBN: 978-0-7181-5202-4
- OCLC: 166867766

The Alphabet of Manliness is the debut book by American humorist and Internet personality Maddox, published in 2006. It reached the #2 position on the New York Times Best Seller list in the "Advice, How-To, and Miscellaneous" category.

== Publication ==
Maddox announced the book on February 22, 2005; further, he announced its title to a mailing list on October 18, 2005. An art contest was held on the website to pick the illustrators. The book was officially completed on January 19, 2006, as announced on Maddox's website. The book first appeared in Barnes and Noble bookstores during May 2006, and it arrived to those who pre-ordered it on June 1, 2006. The book debuted at #4 on the New York Times Best Seller list for "Advice, How-To, and Miscellaneous," and remained on the list for ten weeks. The book was published by Kensington in the United States and was published by Penguin in the United Kingdom.

The 224-page long book is dedicated to Maddox himself: "To the love of my life, my soul mate, and the greatest person in the world: Me."

Several parts of the UK version were removed, perhaps the most notable omission being the "headbutt to the ovaries" section of the first chapter ("A – Ass-Kicking"). The edition also contains a disclaimer.

On February 20, 2009, Maddox announced on the book's web site that he is "working on a new edition of The Alphabet of Manliness," and that "the new edition will be expanded and revised, and will include The Numbers of Manliness."

== Sections ==
The book consists of 26 short sections, each corresponding to a letter of the alphabet.

- A – Ass-Kicking
- B – Boner
- C – Copping a Feel
- D – Dump, Taking a
- E – Enlightenment
- F – Female Wrestling
- G – Gas
- H – Hot Sauce
- I – Irate
- J – Jerky, Beef
- K – Knockers
- L – Lumberjack
- M – Metal
- N – Norris, Chuck
- O – Obedience
- P – Pirates
- Q – Quickies
- R – Road Rage
- S – Sneaking a Peek
- T – Taunting
- U – Urinal Etiquette
- V – Violence
- W – Winner
- X – XXX
- Y – Yelling
- Z – (Office) Zombies

== Illustrators ==
- Bryan Douglas
- Justina Fader
- Louis Fernet-Leclair
- Jim Moore
- John Petersen
- Thomas Pollock Jr.
- Leah Tiscione
- Angelo Vildasol

== Book signing tour ==
After the official release of The Alphabet of Manliness, Maddox went on a book signing tour in several states, starting in his home state of Utah. The first leg of his tour took him from Salt Lake City to the East Coast and Midwest of the United States. The second leg of the tour to the West Coast started on July 13, 2006, ending on July 29, 2006.

On this tour he dressed himself in a large royal gown and was wearing a crown on his head. This provoked many people to get down on their hands and knees in front of him, often kissing his hand.

On the book's website, Maddox also jokingly listed a set of rules for fans, such as barring eye contact or talking directly to him (referring to an urban legend about popular figures such as Hillary Clinton and Shania Twain), formal dress attire, and remaining at least three feet (1 yard) away at all times.

== Extended edition ==
The Alphabet of Manliness: Extended Edition came out on August 25, 2009. It contains an epilogue, 36 additional pages about "The Numbers of Manliness", and eight full-color inserts. Another book tour took place as well.

== See also ==
- Maddox (writer)
- The Best Page in the Universe
