= Teachers (2016 TV series) =

American TV series (2016–2019)

- Genre: Sitcom
- Created by: The Katydids
- Starring: Caitlin Barlow; Katy Colloton; Cate Freedman; Kate Lambert; Katie O'Brien; Kathryn Renée Thomas
- Composer: Joshua Funk
- Country of origin: United States
- Original language: English
- No. of seasons: 3
- No. of episodes: 50 (list of episodes)

Production
- Executive producers: The Katydids; Alison Brie; Ian Roberts; Jay Martel; Matt Miller; Matt Abramson; David Brixton; Alex Fendrich; PJ Fishwick; Jill Cargerman
- Camera setup: Single-camera
- Running time: 21–22 minutes
- Production companies: Martel & Roberts Productions; TV Land Original Productions

Original release
- Network: TV Land
- Release: January 13, 2016 – March 19, 2019

Teachers is an American television sitcom on TV Land that aired from 2016 through 2019. It is based on the web series of the same name by the improv group The Katydids (all members of the group by coincidence have the first name Kate as a root name), and is written by the six members of the group who also play teachers at the Chicago-area Fillmore Elementary School. The series' initial 10 episodes premiered on January 13, 2016. On March 3, 2016, TV Land renewed Teachers for a 20-episode second season, which premiered on January 17, 2017. On March 21, 2017, the series went on hiatus, with the final 10 episodes of season two beginning to air on November 7, 2017. On April 20, 2017, the show was renewed for a 20-episode third season, which premiered on June 5, 2018. On November 20, 2018, TV Land announced that the series would end after three seasons and 50 episodes. The series finale aired on March 19, 2019.

== Premise ==
The series follows the lives, interactions and challenges of six female teachers at the fictional Millard Fillmore Elementary School in suburban Chicago.

== Cast ==
=== Main ===
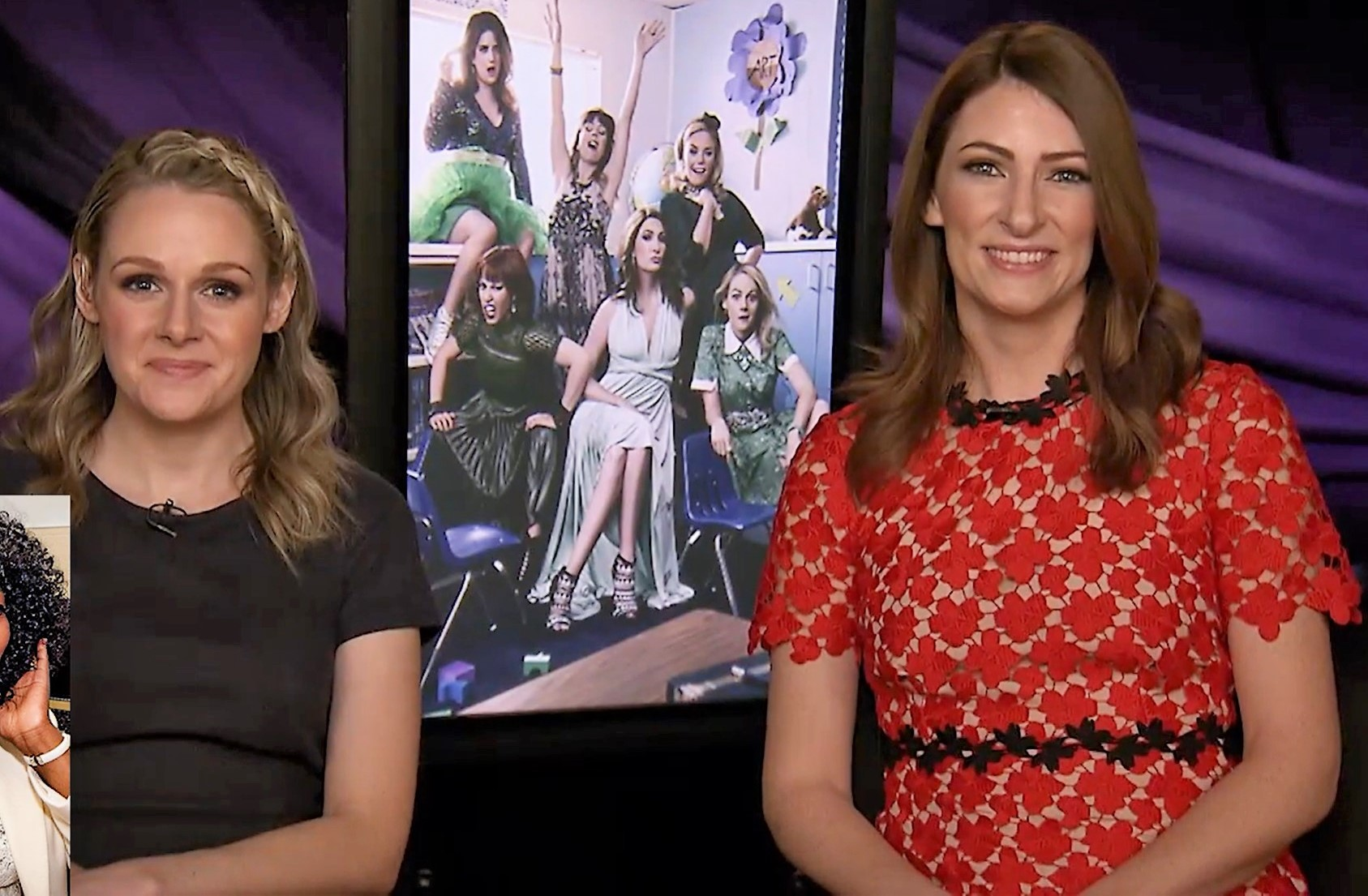
Katie O'Brien (left) and Katy Colloton discuss Teachers in 2017

- Caitlin Barlow as Ms. Cecilia Cannon, the school's art teacher who is very liberal and frequently tries to rally the others to join protests or support causes. She is oblivious that the others see her as odd. Her classroom is replaced with a cart in season 2.
- Katy Colloton as Miss Chelsea Snap, an extremely narcissistic teacher who sleeps around and is obsessed with her looks. She sees herself as a role model and leader despite the fact she is often inappropriate and doesn't get along with other adults. She discovers in season 1 that she may be the worst teacher on staff.
- Cate Freedman as Miss Anna Jane "AJ" Feldman (seasons 1–2, guest season 3), a somewhat lazy person who alternates between being mellow or stressed. She puts little effort into anything, including her appearance. Her only interest appears to be recreational drugs, particularly marijuana. She is somehow the most competent teacher and is beloved by her students. There are occasional hints that the staff know about her violent temper, but this never manifests itself.
- Kate Lambert as Miss Caroline Watson, a relatively competent teacher who is a hopeless romantic, which causes her to sometimes lose perspective. She alternates between childlike innocence and sweetness to being judgmental and neurotic. She is from a rich family and tends to look down on Miss Cannon. She begins a year long relationship with Toby, much to the annoyance of the others.
- Katie O'Brien as Mary Louise Bennigan, a religious, conservative teacher who is depicted as somewhat naïve. This is illustrated through some of her frequent stories about her various church groups. Despite their being polar opposites, she considers Chelsea to be her best friend and puts her on a pedestal. She is easily embarrassed and cares deeply about what others think about her. She begins a relationship with "Hot Dad", but struggles to get along with his underachieving son. She makes numerous references
- Kathryn Renée Thomas as Mrs. Deb Adler, an antisocial, often angry teacher who was an outcast back in her own school days. She sees herself as an outsider when in fact she has the biggest influence. Due to overcrowding, she must teach her class in a mobile home-like outbuilding. She is married to an unsuccessful musician. She is an atheist in the first season, but reveals she was raised as a devout pagan in season 2. She spends much of the shows run pregnant with her first daughter.

=== Recurring ===
==== Adults ====
- Tim Bagley as Principal Toby Pearson. Toby is often condescending to the women. He believes himself to be powerful and masculine, but he is easily intimidated by others. He quits and becomes a substitute teacher in order to continue a relationship with Miss Watson.
- Ryan Caltagirone as "Hot Dad". He is a divorced father who most of the teachers and single moms are infatuated with. He eventually clarifies that he shares affection with Miss Bennigan, but he held back until issues with his ex-wife were resolved. She is the only one who learns his real name (which is James Colton).
- Eugene Cordero as Marty Crumbs. He is a male teacher who behaves like Pearson's lackey. He openly hates all of the other teachers. He gets fired after being caught trying to frame the other teachers.
- Haley Joel Osment as Damien Adler. Damien is Mrs. Adler's husband. He is an unsuccessful musician who makes less than she does. He is also her opposite in personality.
- Jay Martel as Mr. Spinnoli. He is a schoolboard member who makes no secret of his dislike for Miss Snap.
- Richard T. Jones as Frank Humphrey. Frank is the school's security guard in season 2. He appears to be Mr. Pearson's only friend.
- Ryan Hansen as Brent. He is a teacher from another school that once had a one-night stand with Miss Snap.
- Patricia Belcher as Mavis. She is the school secretary who hates Miss Snap.
- David Wain as Pastor Ted. He is the leader of Miss Bennigan's church. While Bennigan puts him on a pedestal, he comes across as weird to the other teachers.
- Adam Korson as Kyle. Kyle is another ex of Miss Snap. He replaces Mr. Pearson as principal. He has little interest in running the school and does the bare minimum.

==== Students ====
- Trevor Larcom as Blake Colton. Blake is the under-achieving son of "Hot Dad". He dislikes all of the teachers, but begrudgingly accepts his father is dating Miss Bennigan.
- Zackary Arthur as David.
- Cheyenne Nguyen as Beth
- Lulu Wilson as Annie
- Siena Agudong as Tiffany
- Nicolas Hedges as Peter
- Mataeo Mingo as Brad

== Development and production ==
Teachers is based on the web series of the same name, created by and starring improv group The Katydids. The series was originally conceived as webisodes, directed by Matt Miller and produced by Cap Gun TV, a development/production studio based in Chicago and Los Angeles.

TV Land ordered a pilot on March 19, 2014, with The Katydids reprising their roles from the web series. Alison Brie executive produces alongside The Katydids, Matt Miller, and Cap Gun TV. Ian Roberts and Jay Martel have signed on as showrunners, with Richie Keen directing the series' pilot. TV Land picked up the show to series on October 1, 2014, with a 10-episode order.

== Episodes ==
Season	Episodes	Originally released	
Season	Episodes	First released	Last released
1	10	January 13, 2016	March 16, 2016
2	20	January 17, 2017	January 16, 2018
3	20	June 5, 2018	March 19, 2019

== Release ==
The first episode was released on demand on December 15, 2015, before the broadcast debut on January 13, 2016.

Internationally, the series premiered in Australia on The Comedy Channel on October 24, 2016.

It premiered on Comedy Central UK on November 7, 2016.

== Critical reception ==
Teachers has received positive reviews from critics. Rotten Tomatoes awarded the series with a rating of 75% based on reviews from 13 critics and an average rating of 5.9 out of 16. The site's critical consensus reads: "Teachers struggles with the transition from web series to television, but gets some good marks for humor." On Metacritic, the series received a score of 66% based on reviews from 10 critics, indicating "generally favorable reviews".

Melissa Camacho of Common Sense Media gave the show a 3 out of 5 stars.
