= I Hope They Serve Beer in Hell =

Book by Tucker Max

- First edition
- Author: Tucker Max
- Cover artist: Erin Tyler
- Language: English
- Genre: Non-Fiction, fratire
- Publisher: Citadel Press
- Publication date: January 2006
- Publication place: United States
- Pages: 277 pp
- ISBN: 978-0-8065-2728-4
- Preceded by: Belligerence and Debauchery: The Tucker Max Stories
- Followed by: Assholes Finish First

I Hope They Serve Beer in Hell is a book of autobiographical short stories about sex and drinking adventures written by Tucker Max. It was a New York Times #1 bestseller and made the Best Seller List each year from 2006 to 2011. It has sold over one million copies worldwide, including 400,000 copies in 2009 alone. The book was subsequently made into a feature film of the same title.

Composed of short stories narrated by the author, the book often focuses on the narrator's humorous excess. The stories deal with themes such as the author's views on women, drinking (often to excess), insulting people, and embarrassing sexual encounters. A sequel, Assholes Finish First, was released by Simon & Schuster on September 28, 2010.

== Fratire ==
Max and George Ouzounian (known more commonly by his pen name, Maddox), are considered founding authors of the 21st century literary genre "fratire", a composite of the nouns "fraternity" and "satire". The term was introduced by The New York Times reporter Warren St. John in a 2006 article titled "Dude, Here's My Book". The genre is characterized by masculine themes and could be considered the male equivalent of chick lit. Both Max and Maddox have pointed out that neither of them were ever members of a fraternity.
