= Maddox (writer) =

American blogger

George Ouzounian
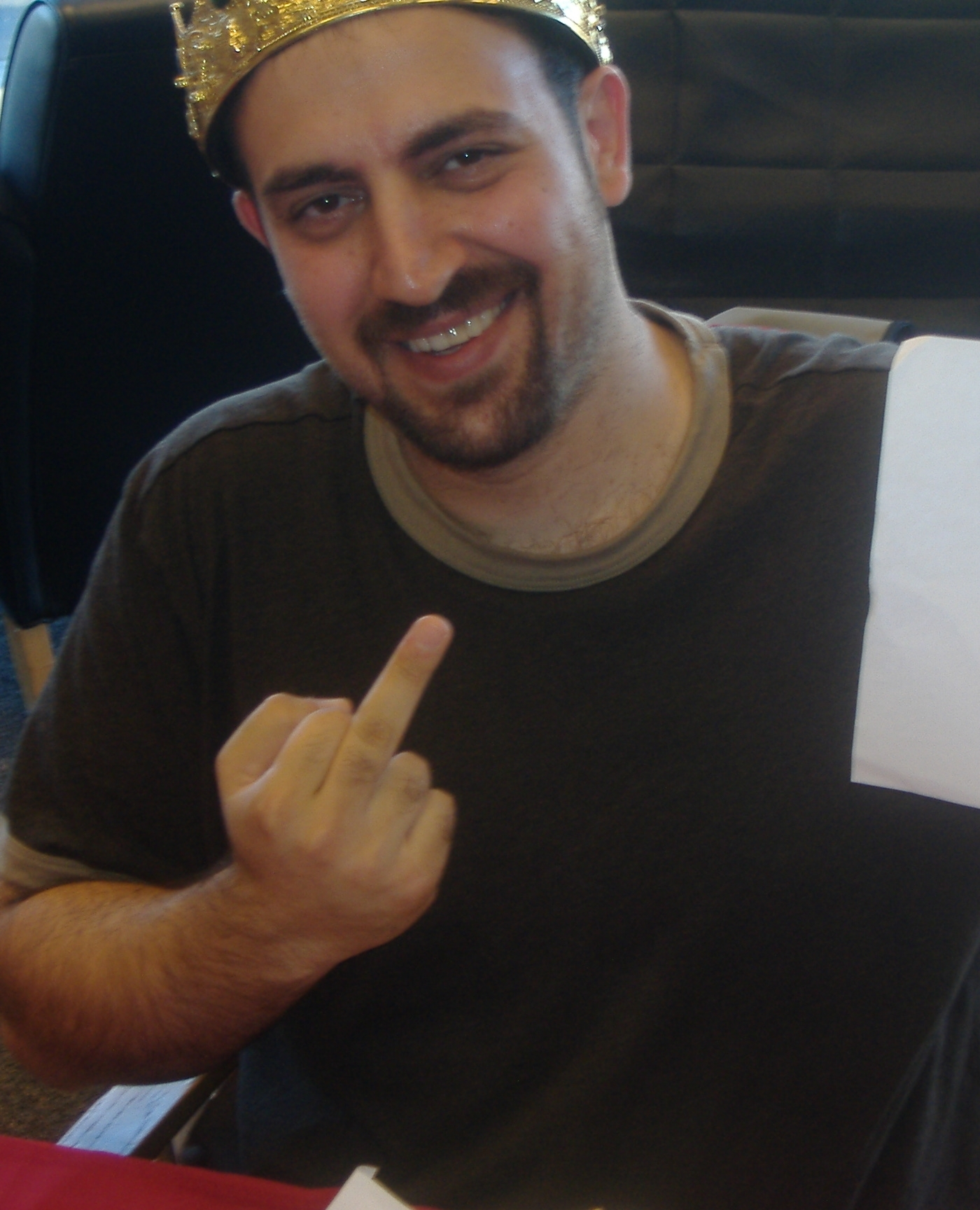
- Maddox in 2006
- Born: George Ouzounian; 1977 or 1978 (age 48–49); Utah, U.S.
- Occupations: Author; blogger; YouTuber
- Writing career
- Pen name: Maddox
- Period: 1997–present
- Genre: Satire
- Website: maddox.xmission.com

George Ouzounian (born 1977 or 1978), known as Maddox, is an American blogger, YouTuber, and author. He gained fame on the internet in the early 2000s for his opinion-oriented website, The Best Page in the Universe, which he still maintains. His first book, The Alphabet of Manliness (2006), became a New York Times bestseller.

== Early life ==
Maddox is a Utah native of Armenian descent. His mother is a Catholic and his father is a Latter Day Saint. He is a graduate of Woods Cross High School in Woods Cross, Utah. Maddox attended the University of Utah, but left without a degree after accumulating 122 credit hours, having already secured employment as a computer programmer.

== Writing career ==
Maddox started The Best Page in the Universe in 1997. He took his pen name from the 1987 original video animation Metal Skin Panic MADOX-01. The majority of the content is satirical. Maddox reported in 2006 that the site's online store earned enough for him to "stay above water." Maddox is reported to have worked as a programmer for a telemarketing company until 2004.

On June 6, 2006, Maddox appeared at San Diego Comic-Con with his comic book, The Best Comic in the Universe. He was also working on a reality television show for Spike TV titled Manformation with Thom Beers and Dax Herrera until the project was shelved in 2011. In 2010, he appeared on Penn & Teller: Bullshit!'s eighth season episode "Old People" and started his own web series, The Best Show in the Universe, on YouTube. In 2012, Maddox appeared in the web series Tournament of Nerds as the character Kool-Aid Man. Maddox has also performed in the Upright Citizens Brigade Theatre and in the horror film Ooga Booga as the character Skeez.

Maddox has written three books, starting with The Alphabet of Manliness published in 2006. It reached number one on the Amazon.com sales chart. The book is illustrated and has a chapter-length entry for each letter in the English alphabet regarding a "manly" topic (for example, N is for Norris, Chuck). In 2011, his second book, I Am Better Than Your Kids, was published. Maddox announced his intention to write a third book in May 2015 and he updated fans about the first draft being written in September 2016. The book, titled F*ck Whales: Petty Essays from a Brilliant Mind, was released in October 2017.

In 2018, Maddox continued to produce episodes of his YouTube web series The Best Show in the Universe of which his channel has about 250,000 subscribers. In the past, episodes were accompanied by an article on a related topic posted to The Best Page in the Universe. Additionally, Maddox sells shirts, hoodies, hats, mugs, and other merchandise through his store. As of 2020, Maddox regularly streams on Twitch, playing as characters "Bananadox," a talking banana, and "Cowboy Ox-Mad", an exaggerated cowboy figure.

=== The Best Page in the Universe ===
The Best Page in the Universe
- Website type: Satire; Fratire
- Owner: Maddox
- Creator: Maddox (George Ouzounian)
- Website: maddox.xmission.com
- Commercial: No
- Launched: 1997
- Current status: Active

The Best Page in the Universe is a personal satirical humor website created by Maddox. Launched in 1997 without any high expectations, the website was primarily a personal homepage for Maddox to host his writings while working as a telemarketer for a small software company. Over time, the website became popular enough to allow Maddox to leave his day job as a telemarketer and commit to writing full-time.

The Best Page in the Universe originated from a text document that Maddox wrote in 1996 named "fifty things that piss me off!". He gave the list to several people on EFnet's Internet Relay Chat channel #coders, and the positive response led him to create the website. Maddox decided to name his site The Best Page in the Universe despite his knowledge that at the time Yahoo! blocked sites with the phrase "the best" in the title from inclusion in its search engine.

On July 15, 2009, Xmission.com, an Internet service provider which hosts The Best Page in the Universe among other Utah clients, had an Alexa rank of about 16,000, declining to 77,000 by June 2017 and almost 300,000 by November 2021. TheBestPageInTheUniverse.net, an alternate domain for Maddox's website, had an Alexa rank of about 33,000 in 2009, 180,000 in 2017 and almost 2.4 million in 2021. Maddox attributes this change in traffic to his focus on launching the Madcast Media Network, a now defunct platform for internet personalities to launch bite-sized entertainment projects.

==== Format and content ====
The Best Page in the Universe's layout was made sparse primarily to reduce bandwidth costs. Maddox also stated that the sparsity protested the many websites that contained "fancy HTML" but lacked substantial content. The page is headed with an image of Maddox's face superimposed over a bust of Che Guevara. In the image, Maddox is wearing a beret emblazoned with the Jolly Roger, and an eye patch. Maddox uses this image as a parody of the revolutionary icon. Maddox says that Che Guevara is remembered as "Che the revolutionary", not "Che the pinko", and claims to be neither socialist nor communist. Instead, he often proclaims himself to be a pirate, and typically portrays himself as such in his articles and artwork.

Maddox has compared reading black text on a white background to "staring at a light bulb". The site uses large, light-colored text on a black background to, in the stated opinion of Maddox, reduce strain on the eyes.

The site contains advertisements only for itself: it sells merchandise, such as stickers and apparel, that bear phrases from its articles. Maddox chose not to use advertisements because he thought they could end up censoring him by dropping ads.

Many of Maddox's articles include Microsoft Paint illustrations, with touch-up done in Adobe Photoshop. Images include elderly people being fired into the Sun, hippies being killed, and Maddox's testicles drawn larger than basketballs. Maddox maintains a section in which he criticizes hate mail his website has generated. When posting his replies he breaks the e-mail down and ridicules points which use fallacious logic and also corrects grammatical or orthographical errors. The site contains several "hidden pages", many of which are unfinished works or first drafts of articles that were moved around.

== Podcast and lawsuit ==
In 2014, Maddox created a weekly podcast titled The Biggest Problem in the Universe, co-hosted by Dax Herrera under the pseudonym "Dick Masterson". The format of the show rotated between each co-host discussing a problem and soliciting votes from the audience. The podcast had its final episode in 2016. This led to Maddox creating a new podcast network called Madcast Media. The pilot program, The Best Debate in the Universe features debates where Maddox argues both sides of an issue.

In 2017, Maddox filed a $372 million harassment lawsuit with the New York Supreme Court against Herrera, individuals at Patreon, and Weber Shandwick copywriter Asterios Kokkinos who made guest appearances on The Biggest Problem in the Universe and The Dick Show. Maddox and his girlfriend, not named in the suit, allege that the defendants launched a trolling campaign against them which resulted in death threats, rape threats, racial slurs and the loss of sponsorship. They cited an album by Kokkinos and a billboard contest by Herrera, which both attempted to mock Maddox, along with targeted ads on Facebook and Reddit. A representative for Shandwick stated their plans to contest the lawsuit's claims, and Herrera rejected the allegations. In 2018, Judge Charles Ramos dismissed the claims against all defendants arguing that those against Herrera should have been filed in the jurisdiction of California. Of the claims against Asterios Kokkinos, Ramos expressed frustration as to the poor drafting of the complaint and its lack of specific evidence, saying, "this complaint is such a mess that I can't address these issues because I can't specifically point to what's being alleged as against your client or your client." Ramos dismissed the claims against Weber Shandwick with prejudice, stating that they were named in the suit "just because someone used their equipment".
