= List of Heroes characters =

From left to right: Micah, Niki, Nathan, Peter, Noah, Claire, Hiro, Mohinder, Matt, Sylar

This is a list of fictional characters in the television series Heroes, the Heroes graphic novels, and the Heroes webisodes.

== Main characters ==
=== Character duration ===
Character	Portrayed by	Appearances				
Character	Portrayed by	Season 1	Season 2	Season 3	Season 4	Reborn
Isaac Mendez	Santiago Cabrera	Main			Guest	
Simone Deveaux	Tawny Cypress	Main				
Micah Sanders	Noah Gray-Cabey	Main	Main	Recurring		Recurring
Matt Parkman	Greg Grunberg	Main	Main	Main	Main	Recurring
Niki Sanders	Ali Larter	Main	Main			
Tracy Strauss	Ali Larter			Main	Main	
Hiro Nakamura	Masi Oka	Main	Main	Main	Main	Recurring
Claire Bennet	Hayden Panettiere	Main	Main	Main	Main	Archive footage
Nathan Petrelli	Adrian Pasdar	Main	Main	Main	Main	
Mohinder Suresh	Sendhil Ramamurthy	Main	Main	Main	Main	Special Guest
Peter Petrelli	Milo Ventimiglia	Main	Main	Main	Main	
D. L. Hawkins	Leonard Roberts	Main	Special Guest			
Noah Bennet	Jack Coleman	Main	Main	Main	Main	Main
Adam Monroe	David Anders		Main	Recurring	Guest	
Elle Bishop	Kristen Bell		Main	Recurring		
Monica Dawson	Dana Davis		Main			
Ando Masahashi	James Kyson Lee	Recurring	Main	Main	Main	
Maya Herrera	Dania Ramirez		Main	Main		
Gabriel "Sylar" Gray	Zachary Quinto	Recurring	Main	Main	Main	
Angela Petrelli	Cristine Rose	Recurring	Recurring	Main	Main	Recurring
Samuel Sullivan	Robert Knepper				Main	

In its inaugural season, Heroes featured an ensemble cast of twelve main characters. During the first season, the NBC Heroes cast page listed ten characters among the cast; Leonard Roberts arrived later, and Jack Coleman was promoted to series regular as of the eleventh episode.

For the second season of the show, Santiago Cabrera, Tawny Cypress, and Leonard Roberts left the main cast. Zachary Quinto and James Kyson Lee, who were recurring characters in the first season, were added to the main cast, and were joined by new cast members David Anders, Kristen Bell, Dana Davis and Dania Ramirez. Anders was meant to be a recurring character, but was promoted to a series regular prior to the start of the season. He is credited as a guest star for the first four episodes of season two.

For the third season, Cristine Rose, recurring in the first two seasons, was promoted to series regular. David Anders, Kristen Bell, and Noah Gray-Cabey were taken off the main cast and become special guest stars. Additionally, Dana Davis was no longer part of the main cast, with scenes involving her in the third season being cut.

For the fourth season, a new character Samuel Sullivan (portrayed by Robert Knepper) was added as a series regular. Cast as a recurring part, the part had been changed to a starring role. Dania Ramirez left the main cast as well.

=== Character profiles ===
Name	Played by	Special abilities
Claire Bennet	Hayden Panettiere	Rapid cellular regeneration
Noah Bennet	Jack Coleman	None
Elle Bishop	Kristen Bell	Electrokinesis
Monica Dawson	Dana Davis	Adaptive muscle memory
Simone Deveaux	Tawny Cypress	None
D. L. Hawkins	Leonard Roberts	Phasing (intangibility)
Maya Herrera	Dania Ramirez	Poison emission
Ando Masahashi	James Kyson Lee	Initially none; acquires power amplification and energy projection after injecting himself with a gene-altering formula
Isaac Mendez	Santiago Cabrera	Precognition (expressed through visual art)
Adam Monroe	David Anders	Immortality
Hiro Nakamura	Masi Oka	Space-time manipulation (allowing teleportation, time manipulation, and time travel)
Matt Parkman	Greg Grunberg	Telepathy; resulting in mental manipulation, illusion, mind control, precognitive dreaming and precognition (expressed through visual art)
Angela Petrelli	Cristine Rose	Enhanced dreaming (allowing precognitive dreaming, postcognitive dreaming, and dream manipulation)
Nathan Petrelli	Adrian Pasdar	Flight
Peter Petrelli	Milo Ventimiglia	Empathic mimicry then tactile power mimicry (after a gene-altering formula) and multiple acquired abilities
Micah Sanders	Noah Gray-Cabey	Technopathy
Niki Sanders	Ali Larter	Enhanced strength
Tracy Strauss	Ali Larter	Cryokinesis; water transformation
Samuel Sullivan	Robert Knepper	Terrakinesis
Mohinder Suresh	Sendhil Ramamurthy	Initially none; acquires enhanced strength, agility and reflexes after injecting himself with a gene-altering formula
Gabriel Gray / Sylar	Zachary Quinto	Intuitive aptitude; multiple acquired abilities

== Other characters with special abilities ==
=== Introduced in season 1 ===
==== Charlie Andrews ====
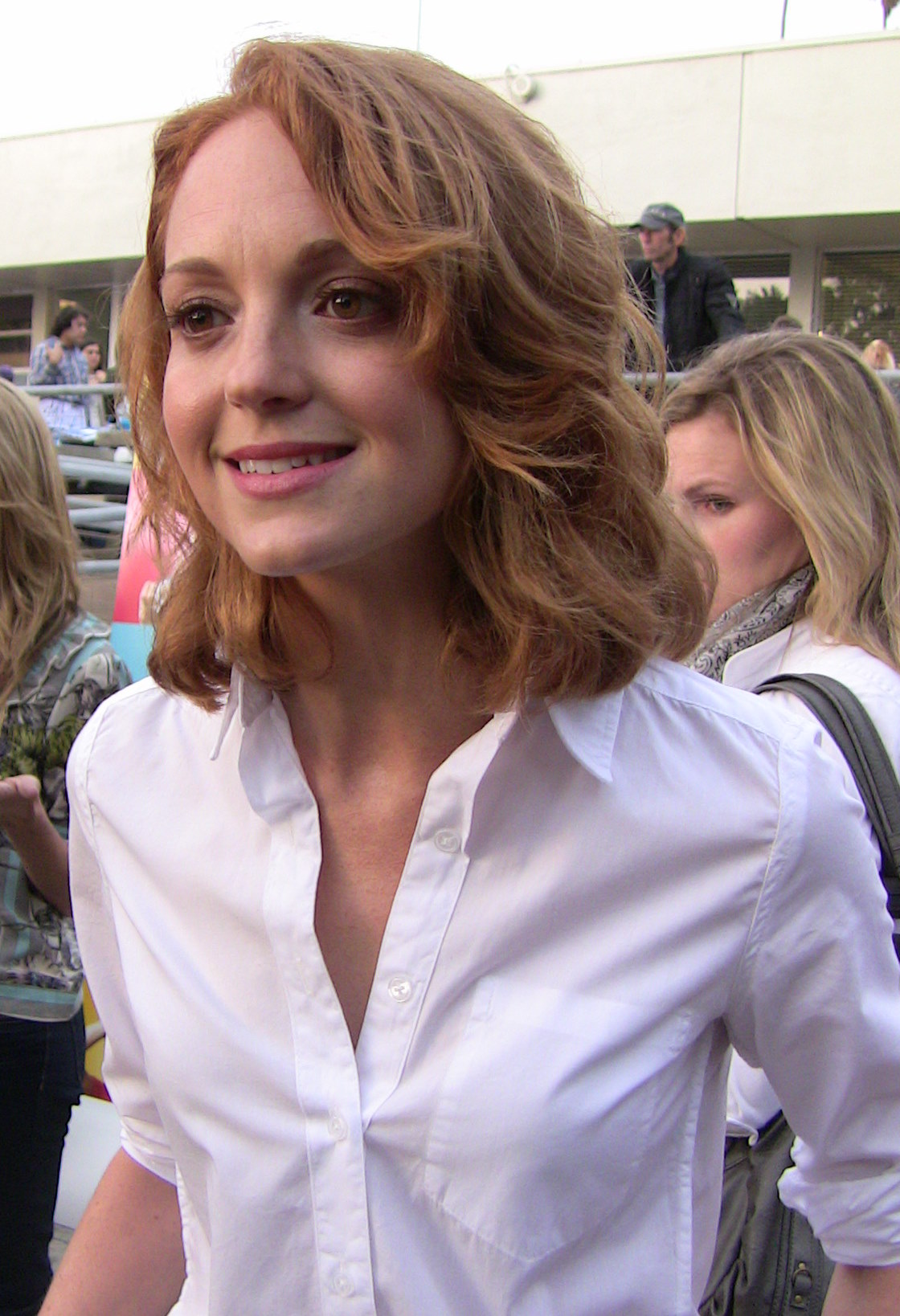
Jayma Mays (2009)

Charlene "Charlie" Andrews, portrayed by Jayma Mays (with K Callan playing an elderly Charlie in one episode), is a waitress at the Burnt Toast Diner in Midland, Texas, where Hiro Nakamura and Ando Masahashi stop to eat on their road trip to New York. After she reveals to Hiro that she had recently developed the ability to quickly memorize and recall any information with great accuracy in a seemingly unlimited volume, Sylar murders her in the diner's storeroom, removing her brain in the same manner as his other victims. Charlie and Hiro's relationship is the subject of the novel Heroes: Saving Charlie. During Six Months Ago, after accidentally traveling back in time six months while trying to save her life, Hiro steadily falls in love with her and she with him and she teaches him English. Morosely, Charlie has a blood clot in her brain that will eventually turn into an aneurysm and kill her making her death inevitable no matter what Hiro does. He is unwillingly returned to his own time, depressed over his inability to save Charlie which affects his powers for the rest of the season. In season 4, after learning that he is dying, Hiro becomes determined once more to save Charlie, referring to her as his true love and seeing his failure to save her as his biggest mistake. In Once Upon a Time In Texas, Hiro returns to the day of Charlie's murder to attempt to save her despite Samuel Sullivan warning against him messing with time as that day and time is a confluence of important events. Hiro is able to stop Sylar and send his past self back six months to ensure their relationship. After Hiro and Charlie two are reunited, her blood clot starts to develop into an aneurysm and she comes close to dying. Desperate, Hiro enlists Sylar's help to save her in exchange for information on his personal future. Sylar removes Charlie's blood clot through her left eye, saving her life, but Charlie is horrified by what Hiro tells Sylar of his future and that he'd save her instead of all those other people Sylar killed. Charlie storms out, but eventually returns to Hiro. She is then kidnapped by Arnold on the orders of Samuel Sullivan and displaced in time to force Hiro to cooperate. In "Brave New World", Hiro is finally reunited with Charlie, now an old woman who is dying of old age. She reveals the location and date she was transported to, but refuses Hiro's offer to go back in time and retrieve her as she has lived a wonderful life. Accepting this, Hiro says a final goodbye to Charlie and teleports away with Ando to stop Samuel.

==== Charles Deveaux ====
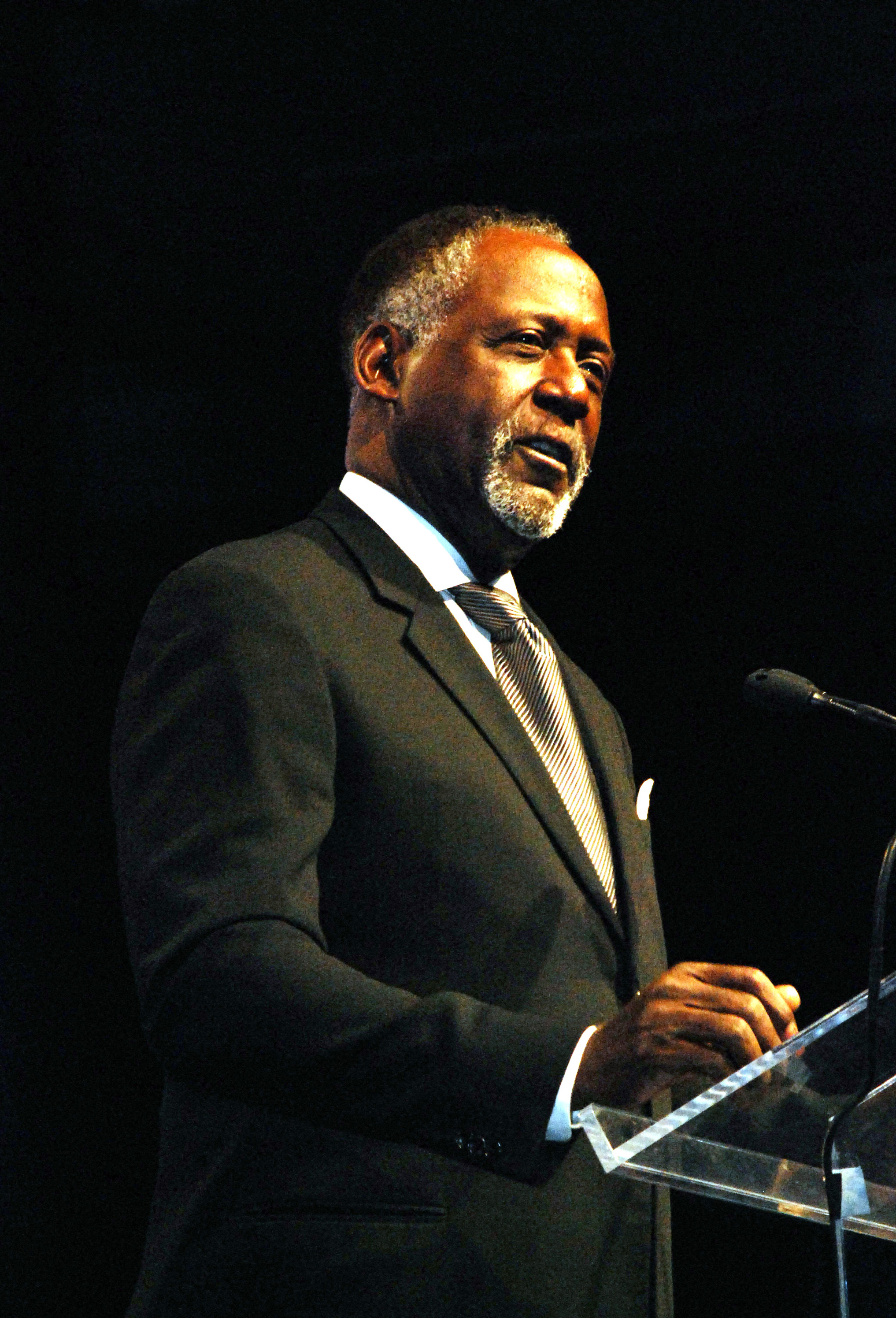
Richard Roundtree (2007)

Charles Deveaux, portrayed by Richard Roundtree, is the wealthy father of Simone Deveaux, and one of the founding members of the Company. He owns the Deveaux Society, which opened with the goal to "fund causes that bettered the world", and the Deveaux Building, the rooftop of which is a frequently visited location in the series. At the beginning of the series, he is under Peter Petrelli's care due to his failing health, and he has recently lapsed into a coma. Charles believes that Peter is "like a son" to him, and that Peter's love and compassion can change the world, as opposed to his former partners' methods. In "Nothing to Hide", Charles and Peter telepathically share a dream in which they fly. After he awakens, he tells Simone about the dream and dies soon after. In "How to Stop an Exploding Man", Peter has a dream in which he witnesses Charles discussing the explosion with his mother, seemingly shortly after Peter became his nurse. Charles then addresses Peter directly, telling Peter he can save the world because he can love. He then calls to Peter's past self, who takes him away, telling the past Peter to call him Charles rather than Mr. Deveaux. In "1961", a younger Charles appears at Coyote Sands with Bob Bishop and Daniel Linderman. The trio meet and befriend Angela Petrelli and Charles is revealed to be telepathic. The group flees before the massacre at Coyote Sands and vow to form a company to protect people like them from that ever happening again.

==== Hana Gitelman ====
Hana Gitelman (Hebrew: חנה גיטלמן) is introduced in a four-part arc of the Heroes graphic novels. She made small, on-screen appearances in the series (played by Stana Katic) during "Unexpected" and "Five Years Gone", but has primarily featured in supplemental material. Hana has the ability to act as a living electronic transmitter and receiver, capable of intercepting and interpreting virtually any form of electronic signal and transmitting coherent signals of any type through thought alone. E-mail, text messages, and phone calls are all simple for her to receive and reproduce if necessary.

==== Meredith Gordon ====
Meredith Gordon, portrayed by Jessalyn Gilsig, is the biological mother of Claire Bennet and the older sister of Flint Gordon. Like her younger brother, Meredith has pyrokinetic abilities, which both enable her to create fire from her body and grant her immunity to the effects of it. Died in explosion by Sylar.

==== The Haitian ====
René, commonly referred to as The Haitian and portrayed by Jimmy Jean-Louis, has the ability to erase peoples' memories as well as suppress the abilities of others' around him within a certain radius/area of himself. Noah Bennett uses his powers to his advantage as the Haitian works for him. For instance, in Season 1, Noah directs the Haitian to remove everyone's memories that are aware of his daughter Claire's ability to spontaneously regenerate. In the alternate futures of Seasons 1 and 3, the Haitian works for the enemy, helping Future Claire kill Future Peter in "I Am Become Death" and blocking Hiro's abilities so he cannot flee in "Five Years Gone" before being killed by Future Mohinder. In Heroes Reborn, The Haitian is running a company called Lumiere Ophthalmology. Noah meets him and retrieves his old glasses, at which point The Haitian attempts to kill him, acting on what he told Noah with his dying breaths were Noah's own orders. Noah later discovers it was to hide the location of Claire's children. Noah later alters the timeline to prevent The Haitian's death and, in the revised timeline, he is a member of Hero Truther's group and working to take down Renautas.

==== Paulette Hawkins ====
Paulette Hawkins, portrayed by Tina Lifford, is the mother of D. L. Hawkins, and Micah's grandmother. Her relationship to Niki is tense, questioning her ability to raise Micah. In "One Giant Leap", she defends D. L. in front of Niki. Paulette is convinced that D. L. was framed for killing his crew. She is not seen again until "The Kill Squad, Part 3" where it is revealed that she has the power to enhance other people's abilities and had become a thorn in the Company's side and was locked in one of the five levels.

==== Sanjog Iyer ====
Sanjog Iyer, portrayed by Javin Reid, is an Indian boy whom Chandra Suresh had been observing prior to leaving for New York. Chandra's notes described Iyer as having a genetic marker allowing the boy to enter people's dreams, where he acts as a "spirit guide" of sorts. He appears in visions that Mohinder Suresh experiences after returning to India with his father's ashes. After Mohinder finds Sanjog, he explains to Mohinder that he does not enter the dreams of others, but that they instead come to him. Sanjog subsequently appears in several Heroes graphic novels, showing visions of the past to various individuals. In an interview with Joe Pokaski and Aron Coleite, they state that Sanjog's character was considered for the storyline involving Molly and her nightmare man, Maury Parkman. The idea was scrapped for reasons they did not reveal.

==== Daniel Linderman ====
Daniel Linderman, portrayed by Malcolm McDowell, has the ability to heal the injuries and illnesses of living organisms; this includes healing the "scars" created by mental manipulation, thereby allowing him to restore lost memories and remove implanted thoughts. He served in the U.S. Army with Arthur Petrelli, whom he ended up healing from the brink of death, in the Vietnam War under the code name "Austin". After the war, Daniel found himself living a nomadic, solitary existence. Though he occasionally drowned his sorrows in alcohol, nothing eased the pain of his war memories. Then he met Linda Tavara, whom he thought he could trust his secret with, but he ended up killing her in self-defense; Linda's list led him to reunite with Arthur. He eventually became a reputed mobster, and founder of Linderman Corporation under the guidance of Adam Monroe. He acts as one of the main villains of Genesis before being killed by D. L. Hawkins for threatening his family. In the "spirit walk" of Villains, it is revealed that Arthur was the one who ordered Nathan's accident, not Linderman and that Linderman was disturbed by Arthur's treatment of his wife. Despite his unsavoury ways, Linderman possessed a shred of decency and healed the damage done to Angela's mind so she'd know the truth about what Arthur was doing.

==== Ando Masahashi ====
Ando Masahashi (正橋安藤, Masahashi Andō) is a fictional character on the NBC superhero television drama series Heroes, portrayed by James Kyson Lee. The character was promoted to series regular in the first season. Introduced to television audiences in the pilot episode "Genesis" as an employee at Yamagato Industries, Ando is a partner to his co-worker and friend Hiro Nakamura on various quests to save the world. He often has to overcome insecurities about being undervalued and being seen as a sidekick or liability due to his lack of special abilities in contrast to Hiro and other characters. At the end of the third volume, "Villains", he acquires the ability to massively amplify the power of any posthuman he touches. Later, in the fourth volume, "Fugitives", Ando has learned to channel this energy into concussive blasts, projecting the energy outward to knock back any targets.

Ando first appeared to the audience as a friend of Heroes protagonist Hiro Nakamura, watching an internet video of online stripper Niki Sanders. Ando did not believe that Hiro could manipulate space and time, even after Hiro teleported into the women's bathroom of a bar. After the incident, he told Hiro to stop trying to be different and accept his lot in life. When Hiro returned from the future in "One Giant Leap", he convinced Ando of his powers and Ando then traveled with Hiro to America to prevent the explosion from occurring. Following an issue of a "9th Wonders!" comic book they went to Las Vegas and visited a casino, where Hiro used his powers to cheat at gambling. After being thrown out, they were attacked by some men that lost money to them. They argued in the next episode and Ando left Hiro to find Niki Sanders at her home, where he was apprehended by a group of police. He then reunited with Hiro in their journey to find Isaac Mendez.

Every hero is on a journey to find his place in the world. But it's a journey. You don't start at the end, otherwise they can't make a movie about it later.

— Ando to Hiro in "Better Halves"

After contacting Peter Petrelli, Ando and Hiro learnt about the latters future self. They were again confronted by the men they defeated in the poker game, and forced to play another round. Ando panicked during the game and rushed with Hiro to the bathroom. While in there, their opponents were killed and they fled. Ando later consoled Hiro, telling him he could perhaps change their deaths by time travel after their mission. While on the road, they happened upon a burning car, and helped D.L. Hawkins save the life of the passengers. Ando called the police, which forced D.L. to flee with his son Micah. Further along in their journey they stopped at a Diner in Odessa, Texas, where they met a waitress named Charlie Andrews, who had the ability to instantly memorize things. When Charlie was killed in the storage room of the diner by an unknown man Hiro, despite Ando's pleading, traveled back in time to prevent her death. He failed to return within five seconds as he promised, leaving Ando alone. Later in the diner, Ando noticed a picture of Charlie and Hiro together, taken six months ago, and realized Hiro had traveled back there. Peter Petrelli called, and later met Ando at the diner. Ando protested against Peter going to find "the cheerleader" without the presence of someone with abilities, but Peter left.

Eventually, Hiro returned, having failed to save Charlie, and they continued onwards to Union Wells High School. When it became clear they had arrived too late, Hiro felt the world was doomed. As they left, they received a phone call from Isaac Mendez, whom they met back at the diner, with Isaac telling them of his prophetic paintings. Later, he painted another of Hiro. In "Godsend", Ando and Hiro finally arrived at New York, and visited the Museum of Natural History looking for a sword like the one in Isaac's painting, and they find the Blade of Takezo Kensei, a legendary samurai. They stole it, but it transpired that the sword was a replica, with the original belonging to a Mr. Linderman. They went to Isaac's loft seeking his help, and met Simone Deveaux, who told them that Linderman resided in Las Vegas. When Ando and Hiro were kidnapped and brought to Hiro's father in "The Fix", Ando became attracted to Hiro's sister, Kimiko in the next episode. In "Run!", Ando became infatuated with a woman named Hope, who convinced Ando to obtain a bag of hers from her 'ex-boyfriend'. When he returned with it, Hope convinces Ando to give her a ride. Hiro, who had been locked up by Hope, pursued them with her 'ex-boyfriend', a gaming commission officer. This led to a shoot-out between Hope and the officer, and afterwards, Hiro told Ando to go home. Ando nonetheless followed Hiro, and saved him from arrest when Hiro was discovered stealing Takezo Kensei's sword from Linderman's casino. Hiro teleported them away. In ".07%", it is revealed to the audience that Hiro has teleported them both five years into the future, were they encounter Hiro's future self. With "Five Years Gone", New York has been devastated by the atomic explosion predicted by Isaac. When Hiro is captured by Homeland Security, Ando and Future Hiro escaped, and plotted to free him so he and Ando could return to their time and stop the bomb. Ando learned from Future Peter that he was killed in the explosion. They eventually manage to free Hiro, but Future Hiro was killed by Matt Parkman. As he died, he handed to Ando a page of a "9th Wonders!" comic book.

Ando and Hiro returned to the present, and traveled to Isaac's loft to consult him. They found him dead, killed by Sylar, and hid as the killer detected them. They escaped him and then followed him to his mother's. Hiro did not want to kill Sylar, but Ando showed Hiro the "9th Wonders!" comic page which shows him dead. Hiro unsuccessfully attempts to kill Sylar. He and Ando teleport to safety, where they discovered that the sword has been broken. They try to have the sword repaired, and Ando and Hiro encountered Hiro's father once more. Kaito and Hiro spoke alone, and Ando, impatient, decided to seek out and kill Sylar himself. In the season finale, Ando went to Isaac's loft and found Sylar. The superhuman villain overpowered him and prepared to kill him. Ando dropped the "9th Wonders!" comic book in the process, revealing to Sylar that Hiro would kill him. When he started to kill Ando, Hiro arrived and teleported himself and Ando to the offices of Yamagato industries back in Tokyo, where their journey started. Hiro gives Ando Kensei's sword, promised to return, before he finally teleported to Kirby Plaza to kill Sylar with Ando's sword.

In the graphic novel "Heroism is Found in the Heart", after Hiro was teleported back to Japan, Ando was reassigned by Kaito Nakamura to Hiro's former position. Ando became infatuated with Kimiko Nakamura and sought her affections. One night, he walked her home and they were confronted by a group of bikers. Ando learned that the leader, Fukazawa, was also pursuing Kimiko. Ando and Kimiko ran, but were eventually cornered. Ando promised to protect Kimiko and confronted the gang. When they ran away, Ando kissed Kimiko. Neither were aware that Kaito had scared the pursuers away.

In "Four Months Later...", Ando has returned to New York City following Hiro's disappearance, waiting for his friend's return with Kaito Nakamura. Kaito receives a death threat and Ando leaves to get a sword for protection. He returns to see Kaito killed by Adam Monroe, though Ando does not see the killer's face.

Following Kaito's death, Ando is questioned by Matt Parkman about the incident, but, besides telling him the meaning of the helix symbol, Ando is unable to answer his questions. In the episode "Kindred", Ando discovers that Hiro has left messages for him, stored within the hilt of Takezo Kensei's sword. The messages, written while he was in the year 1671, detail Hiro's adventures with Takezo Kensei.

Hiro returns in "Out of Time", to Ando's delight. While both are happy about the reunion, Ando sorrowfully tells Hiro about his father's death. At Kaito's funeral, Ando is dismayed at Hiro's decision to go back and time to save his father, but is unable to dissuade him. However, Hiro realizes that Ando is right and does not change history, instead using the opportunity to discover that Adam Monroe, who he knows as Takezo Kensei, was responsible. Hiro makes it his mission to stop Adam and confronts him at the Primatech Paper Facility. He returns to Ando with the assurance that Adam can never hurt anyone again.

In "The Second Coming", Hiro, resigned to working in his father's office at Yamagato Industries, told Ando that he was bored without a quest. Suddenly Kaito's lawyer turned up with a recorded message from Kaito to Hiro. It instructed him to guard the contents of a safe, and never open it. Hiro curiously opened the safe and found one half of a molecular formula, which was stolen by an unidentified person with the ability of super speed. When Hiro travelled to the future to learn more about the formula, he saw himself be killed by Ando, who had a power. Ando then took the formula before Tokyo was devastated by an unexplained disaster. After that in "The Butterfly Effect", they travelled to Paris in search of the thief, identified as Daphne Millbrook, and Hiro explained to Ando that in the future he saw Ando kill him. Ando was shocked and told Hiro he could never do that when Daphne arrived. Events led to Hiro freezing time while Daphne held a knife at Ando's throat. Hiro saved Ando by allowing her to leave with the formula. They continued to follow Daphne in the next episode, and she tried to drive Hiro and Ando apart by undermining Ando. Hiro and Ando noticed the Haitian, and discovered he was in possession of the other half of the formula. Ando knocked the Haitian out.

Daphne managed to steal the other half from them, and before they can give chase, the Haitian awoke and apprehended them both, taking them to the Level 2 prisons of the Primatech Facility. The next episode showed Hiro and Ando arguing, with Ando claiming that Hiro did not value him as a partner. While trying to escape, Hiro realized he did need Ando. They almost escape, but are caught by the Haitian. He takes them to Angela Petrelli, who claims that Hiro has the "key" to solving the whole issue of the formula. Ando then helped Hiro dig up the key: Adam Monroe. In "Angels and Monsters", Adam begrudgingly took Ando and Hiro to a bar that was a gathering place for "specials for hire", and caused a fight. This led to Hiro being knocked out, and Adam escaping. Ando proclaimed them "the worst heroes ever", before Daphne and Knox entered the bar, wanting to recruit Hiro to the Pinehearst Company. Knox said that to prove himself, Hiro had to kill Ando, handing him a sabre sword.

Hiro appeared to do so, but in the next episode it was revealed that Hiro froze time. After that, he acquired a collapsible sword and fake blood, then traveled slightly back in time to tell Ando that, when the time came, he had to pretend to be dead. He returned to the correct moment, and stabbed Ando. When Daphne and Knox left, Ando stood up again. They travelled to Africa on their first assignment in search of Usutu, a man who could paint the future. Ando expressed doubt over their situation, saying they were working for the bad guys. Hiro reassured him it was simply to infiltrate Pinehearst. They were unable to capture Usutu through Hiro's time traveling abilities, so they tried to do it by hiding and waiting for him. He congratulates them for using their heads as opposed to Hiro's power, and in "Eris Quod Sum", offers Hiro and Ando the chance to take a spirit walk for guidance. Ando refused, and watched over Hiro as he slept in "Villains". In "It's Coming", he tried to save Hiro from Arthur Petrelli, but was tossed aside by Arthur's telekinesis. When Arthur became distracted, he and Hiro escaped.

Hiro though, had regressed back into his 10-year-old self, and Ando tried to help him reclaim his memories in a bowling alley. Hiro then teleported them to a comic book store, where Ando spotted a new issue of "9th Wonders!" and saw an opportunity to help Hiro become normal again. In the first part of "The Eclipse", Ando was taken by Hiro to Mohinder Suresh's apartment to meet Matt Parkman, and the three followed the speedster after she fled to her childhood home. Hiro and Matt were shocked to discover their powers gone. While Matt attempted to talk to Daphne, Ando and Hiro left, with Hiro claiming to know a way to regain his power. Hiro takes him to a comic book store, and with the help of two comic book geeks Sam and Frack, the four search through copies of 9th Wonders! to learn of Hiro's fate and any possible way to repair his memory. After Frack discovers a scene depicting Hiro and Claire Bennet hiding as Kaito Nakamura gives baby Claire to her father Noah Bennet, Hiro teleports away without Ando.

Parkman and Daphne find Ando in the comic book store, and they try to figure out how to follow Hiro's adventure. Sam tells them that there is only one last copy of 9th Wonders!, given by Isaac Mendez to a bike courier before his death. Daphne takes Ando and Parkman to New York in "Our Father" to track the comic book down. They find the last copy, and discover that Hiro is stuck 16 years in the past as Arthur Petrelli has taken Hiro's powers. The three come to the conclusion that the only way to save Hiro is to find another time-traveler. Ando volunteers himself to take an experimental formula to give him the ability to manipulate space and time so he can save Hiro. In "Dual", Daphne steals a dose of the formula from Mohinder, and gives it to Ando. Ando manifests the ability to "super charge" the abilities of others, which he uses on Daphne to allow her to run faster than the speed of light, enabling time travel per Einstein's Theory of Relativity. They rescue Hiro from the past, saving Hiro from death at the hands of his father but likewise preventing Hiro from destroying the formula. Nevertheless, Hiro is able to steal the formula in the present with Daphne's help and the group celebrates as he destroys it.

In "A Clear and Present Danger" Hiro and Ando are back in Japan. Hiro has bought an abandoned fire station as their headquarters. Ando leaves Hiro frustrated after Hiro is injected with a GPS device, and so Ando feels that Hiro is trying to live through him, since Hiro has lost his powers. Later, Ando hears Hiro being kidnapped by Nathan's agents through the phone.

In "Trust and Blood", using the GPS device Hiro injected himself with, Ando figures out that Hiro is in Arkansas. Daphne arrives in Japan to find Hiro and Ando to talk about Matt's disappearance. Daphne and Ando go to Arkansas and see the plane's crash site. After Daphne appears to have been killed and Claire uses herself as a shield, Ando, Mohinder, Matt, and Hiro escape and meet up with Peter. Then he and Hiro realize that they must travel to India as seen in one of Matt's paintings.

In "Building 26", once in India, Hiro and Ando realize that they must save a local girl, Annapoora, from being married against her will. At first Ando uses his red glow as the sign she was looking for, but he "steals" Hiro's chance to recover his powers and also he ends up being kidnapped by the groom to force Annapoora into marriage. Finally, Hiro realizes that he does not need powers to be a hero, as he saved the girl without them, getting Ando back too. Later, Annapoora gives them a message "Rebel" sent them: to find Matt Parkman in LA.

As seen in "Shades of Gray" and continued in "Cold Snap", Hiro and Ando arrive Los Angeles where they find that the Matt Parkman "Rebel" was referring to was only a baby, also named Matt Parkman. Later they discover that this is actually the son of the Matt Parkman they know, and also discover the baby possesses the ability to touch things and make them "go." While Hiro and Ando are convincing Janice that Matt Sr. is not a terrorist and that his baby is in danger, agents take Janice away and break into the house. Ando shows that his acquired ability can also be used as an offensive weapon when he channels the energy outward to hit one of the pursuing agents, before Hiro manages to stop time with his partially restored ability (Matt Jr. used his powers to restore part of Hiro's). Hiro carries baby Matt and a paralyzed Ando to safety as he is unable to teleport, having only regained the ability to stop time.

In "Turn and Face the Strange", Hiro and Ando have the mission to take baby Matt to Matt Sr., but Matt Jr. keeps inactivating any vehicle they are on due to the noise they make, until Ando comes with a funny face to entertain the baby, so Hiro convinces him to keep it so the "cube" can go. They finally manage to track down Matt Sr. who has gone to confront Danko. Hiro ends up saving Matt, and then he meets his son for the first time, giving Matt a reason to live again.

In "I Am Sylar", after failing to convince Matt to join them, Hiro and Ando go to Reed Street Laboratories to set up a trap for HLS agents, using Ando as bait. Although he refuses, as Hiro manages to not freeze him, Hiro still keeps his plan going on, unfreezing the agents so they can take down Ando, and then freezing everybody again so he can take an agent's place as they carry Ando to the "Building 26". Once in motion, Ando is awoken by Hiro so he can be ready for action, but when an agent realizes Hiro is not one of them, Ando shoots a big blast of red lightning, affecting everyone and saving Hiro. As plan B, they use the GPS signal of the agents to track the place, and once they are ready to fight, Hiro tries to freeze time, but instead he receives a strong headache and nosebleed as they realize he cannot use his ability anymore. Ando is then seen aiding Hiro.

In "An Invisible Thread", because of Hiro's condition, Ando plans to enter "Building 26" by himself, but Hiro recovers and insists on continuing with the plan despite the danger. Hiro stops time and both break in to free the trapped prisoners, including Mohinder, Noah and Danko, and replace the drugged evolved humans with all of the "Building 26" staff. Once time is going, Hiro and Ando show the freed prisoners the way out. Ando asks Mohinder to check out Hiro, finding out his body is rejecting his powers and he should stop using them. As Hiro faints after saving Noah from Danko, he is apparently taken to a hospital by Ando and Mohinder. Later, Ando, along with Hiro, witness the burning of Sylar's (really James Martin) body and then both decide to return home.

In "Orientation", Ando and Hiro have opened a hired hero business called "Dial-A-Hero" in a conference room at the Yamagato Building, which enrages Kimiko. On Ando insistence to visit a doctor, Hiro reveals that his headaches are caused by a terminal illness, and he is dying. Attending their first mission, saving a girl's cat, both Ando and Hiro realize their abilities are not fitted to the situation, but still Ando is forced by Hiro to help the cat. Once he catches the cat, Ando loses balance and falls. Hiro stops time saving him, but Ando notices Hiro remains frozen while time is resumed. Ando then takes Hiro to Yamagato where he unfreezes. While talking, they remember the carnival they attended 14 years before, where a fortune teller directed Hiro on his path to being a hero. Ando remembers as he accidentally spilled a drink over Kimiko, causing her to hate him despite he was in love with her. While remembering this, Hiro's time travel manifests teleporting him to the carnival 14 years in the past.

In "Jump, Push, Fall", while Hiro is at the carnival in the past, a young Ando is seen together with a young Kimiko in the carnival. The young Hiro rushes into them making Ando spill a Slushy in Kimiko's direction, but Samuel Sullivan pushes adult Hiro in the way to show him past can be changed, so he gets wet instead of Kimiko. This event avoids Ando to be hated by Kimiko, and when adult Hiro teleports back to the present, he finds out the two of them felt in love at the carnival and have dated since.

In "Acceptance", Kimiko reveals to Hiro that she and Ando have gotten engaged. Ando is concerned about Kimiko wanting Hiro to give her away in the wedding a year from now, knowing that he may not be alive by that time, so he talks Hiro into confessing the truth to Kimiko. Hiro's ever-lasting mission to save a man makes him hear this speech from Ando over and over again, and finally understands the picture. Ultimately, Hiro tells Kimiko the truth about his illness, and then suffers a headache; Ando rushes in the office to help him, but Hiro teleports away in front of Ando and Kimiko, leaving her extremely shocked.

In "Once Upon a Time in Texas", as Hiro travels back in time 3 years to Midland, Texas to save Charlie, he meets past-Ando waiting for past-Hiro to teleport back (Seven Minutes to Midnight timeline). Hiro convinces past-Ando to stay at the diner to avoid making too many changes and preserve history.

In "Upon This Rock", a brain-addled Hiro is brought to Ando by the police after they find a business card on him. Ando reveals that Hiro has been missing for six weeks and figures that Hiro's referring to himself and everything else as fictional characters (with Ando being Sancho Panza) is a side-effect of his brain tumor. Ando does not understand what Hiro means by they have to save "Doctor Watson" at "Arkham" in the land of the "swamp dragons", but decides to check Hiro's comics to try to figure it out. Ando eventually realizes that Hiro is referring to Florida when Hiro mentions Curt Connors and realizes that the "swamp dragons" are alligators and that Arkham refers to an insane asylum though he still does not understand the Doctor Watson reference. Ando searches on the web and finds that there's an asylum on Arkham Road in Florida and realizes that Hiro means Ando is his sidekick when he refers to him as Sancho Panza. Ando admits this, but Hiro refers to him as the best sidekick he knows.

In "Close to You", Ando checks Hiro into the asylum Hiro keeps referring to, but is reluctant as Hiro in his addled state cannot stop time or use his powers. Hiro points Ando to "Watson's" room as he's led away, and after Ando uses his power to bypass a lock, he finds out "Watson" is Mohinder Suresh and realizes that Hiro wants to save him. Ando, realizing that Mohinder cannot use his powers due to the drugs the orderlies are giving him, switches Mohinder's pills with aspirin to stop that, but accidentally swallows Mohinder's pills and enters into a drug-induced daze. Hiro hides him in a closet and later that night frees Mohinder, but the two are forced to wheel Ando out in a wheelchair as he's still in a daze. As the three are found by orderlies, Ando snaps out of it and uses his powers to blast open a door leading out, creating enough of a distraction that Mohinder is able to overpower the orderlies and allow the three to escape. Running through a swamp chased by orderlies and dogs, the three are forced to hide behind a tree and Mohinder suggests Ando use his power like electro-shock therapy to restore Hiro's mind so he can teleport them away. Ando is reluctant as his future self killed Hiro using that power, but Mohinder convinces him to try. Ando shocks Hiro and it does work, restoring Hiro's mind back to normal. With Hiro back to normal, he teleports himself, Mohinder and Ando to Noah Bennet's apartment, seconds before orderlies and dogs find their hiding place. When the three teleport in, they interrupt Noah and Lauren Gilmore kissing and Hiro asks the two for their help.

In "Pass/Fail", Ando and Hiro watch as Mohinder creates a compass for Noah to use and suggests Ando or Hiro as the ones that use it as only someone with powers can use it. After Mohinder leaves, Hiro collapses due to his brain tumor and Ando has him rushed to the hospital. There, Ando watches worried as the doctors prepare to perform brain surgery to try to remove the tumor and save Hiro's life. In Hiro's hallucination, Ando acts as his lawyer during his trial and his young self acts as a witness for the prosecution. In the real world, Ando watches the surgery and when Hiro crashes makes a rousing speech that gives Hiro strength in his hallucination. The doctors manage to revive Hiro and remove the tumor. Ando later visits Hiro as he recovers from the surgery.

In "Brave New World", Ando is happy to see Hiro awake and has him test his powers which Hiro now has full control of after his tumor was removed. Ando and Hiro are shocked when Hiro receives a note from Charlie and Ando watches as a now old Charlie and Hiro reunite. When Hiro plans to travel back in time to get Charlie after she arrived in the past, Ando thinks Hiro is being selfish to try to do that as Charlie is clearly happy and leaves the room. He receives a call from Noah Bennet who wants him and Hiro to come to the Carnival in Central Park and Ando goes to get Hiro. Hiro has changed his mind about going back in time after talking to Charlie and now feels he has lost his purpose and has finished all of his missions, but Ando reminds him of Samuel and informs him of Noah's call. Hiro teleports himself and Ando to the Carnival where Claire asks Hiro to teleport all of the carnies away. Hiro tells them all to hold hands, but is unsure if he can teleport them all as there are over a dozen, so Ando offers to use his powers to supercharge Hiro's to teleport everyone. Hiro agrees to try and thanks to Ando supercharging his power, Hiro successfully teleports everyone away which results in Samuel's defeat as the removal of all the special reduces Samuel's power significantly.

==== Eden McCain ====
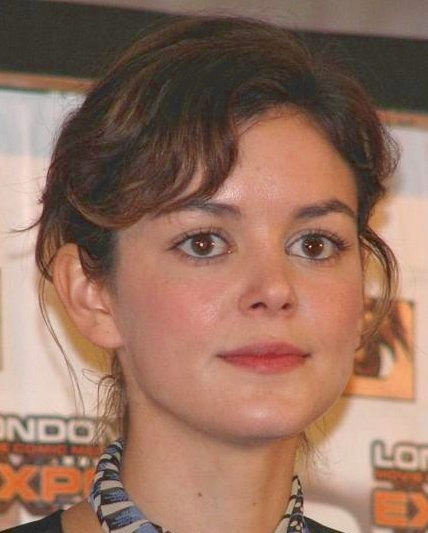
Nora Zehetner (2007)

Eden McCain, portrayed by Nora Zehetner, is a Company operative with the power of persuasion, to control others through verbal communication. Born "Sarah Ellis", her father left her to live with her stepmother at an early age, which caused her stepmother to blame her for her father's actions and to abuse her for it. She discovered her power after saying "I wish you'd just die!" to her stepmother, which caused her heart to instantly stop beating. She headed west, adopted her new name, and began living selfishly until being taken in by Noah Bennet and the Haitian, who persuaded her to work with them. On Noah's orders, she moved in near Chandra Suresh and befriended him in order to remove Claire Bennet's name from the list of posthumans. She later attempts to kill Sylar during his imprisonment, but he's able to subjugate her. With no other choice Eden kills herself before Sylar could steal her powers.

==== Kaito Nakamura ====
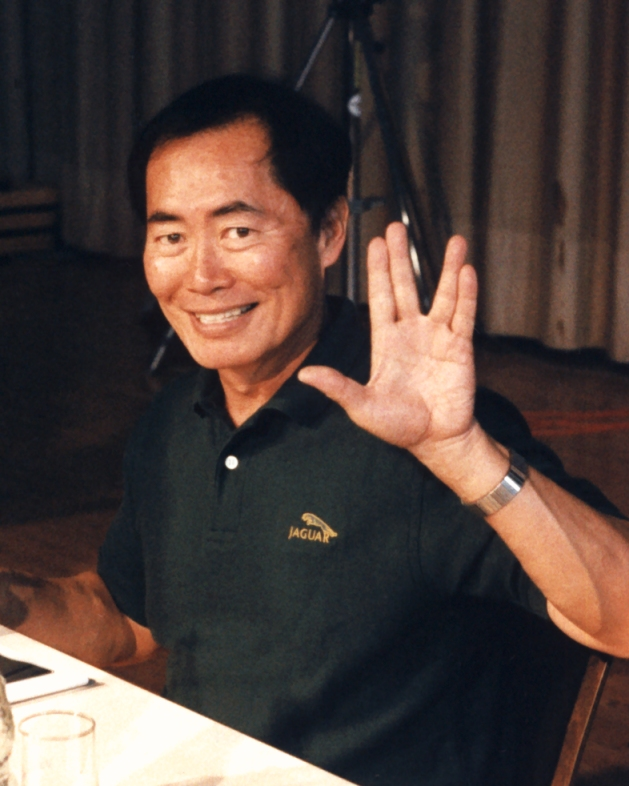
George Takei (1996)

Kaito Nakamura, portrayed by George Takei and Eijiro Ozaki (in a flashback), is a stern and powerful businessman in Japan and the father of Hiro Nakamura. He is the CEO of Yamagato Industries, and he is described as a man with "real power" by his underlings. He is initially very disappointed with Hiro, who does not show any sort of drive, though he eventually comes to respect his son as he develops into a hero. He is one of the founders of the Company. It is revealed in a deleted scene (in the season two DVD boxset) that he has the power of studying a situation and predicting its outcomes, though in the series he never uses this ability.

==== Claude Rains ====
Claude Rains, portrayed by Christopher Eccleston, is a former employee of the Company and agent alongside Noah Bennet. His real name is unknown; his pseudonym, first used while working for the Company, references the actor who starred in The Invisible Man. A posthuman, he has the ability to turn himself, any personal objects he touches, and other people invisible. Claude's power is limited to the visible spectrum; it does not make him inaudible, nor does it mask his body heat or other such emissions, allowing him to be tracked through thermal imaging or similar methods. Claude guides Peter Petrelli and teaches him how to use his power, however, several powers then begin to overwhelm him at once, until Claude knocks him unconscious. Peter rescues the unconscious Claude by using the power of flight absorbed from his brother Nathan. Later, Claude is so apprehensive of the threat posed by Bennet that he ends his partnership with Peter.

==== Ted Sprague ====
Theodore Sprague, portrayed by Matthew John Armstrong, has the ability to generate and manipulate radiation, which he only discovers after being abducted by the Haitian. At first, he has very little control over his power and is extremely destructive, causing such harmful side-effects as radiation poisoning, which ends up killing his wife. When he gains better control over his ability, Ted realizes he is also able to produce an EMP when necessary. He was eventually brutally killed by Sylar and his corpse left behind after Sylar caused a car accident that killed his captors and left him hanging upside down by himself.

==== Brian Davis ====
Brian Davis, portrayed by David Berman, is an evolved human who has the ability to move things by the use of his mind. Sylar, who stole Davis's contact information from Chandra Suresh, called up Davis and gave him an alias, choosing "Sylar" from the brand name of a watch that he was working on, telling him he can fix his problem. When he revealed his telekinetic ability to Sylar, Davis asked Sylar if he could remove it. Sylar, driven by his aggression and hunger for power killed him and stole his ability, making him the first of several victims.

==== Zane Taylor ====
Zane Taylor, portrayed by Ethan Cohn, is the first person to respond to Mohinder's calls when Mohinder resumes his father's research. Zane leaves a phone message on Mohinder's answering machine, inviting him to Virginia Beach to talk. Sylar arrives first, and impersonates Mohinder. After an anxious Zane displays his ability to liquefy objects, Sylar kills him. When Mohinder arrives later on, Sylar instead impersonates Zane and demonstrates the power to liquefy the toaster instantly. According to the article reporting his death, Zane is a musician; he is seen wearing a Ramones T-shirt, which Sylar then wears while impersonating him.

==== Molly Walker ====
Molly Walker, portrayed by Adair Tishler, possesses the ability to locate any person in the world using a pin and a map just by thinking of them. She first appears in Episode 2.

Molly returns in Season 2, having been adopted by Parkman and Suresh. As a favor to Matt, she locates his father Maury, despite fearing him as the "Nightmare Man" who torments her. Mohinder delivers her to the Company, thinking it would be better for her there. In the Season 2 finale, she is menaced by Sylar but escapes unharmed; she makes a few brief appearances in Season 3, then disappears from the series without explanation. In the graphic novels, she is shown living with Mohinder's mother in India, hopefully out of harm's way.

In Heroes Reborn, played by Francesca Eastwood, Molly reappears as a young woman who is being used by Erica Kravid to track "evos" after Claire's reveal of their existence. While she is eventually rescued by Noah Bennet, Molly seems mentally unstable and refuses to tell Noah anything more than that Claire is dead and that she was part of a group that was doing anything to protect "them", later implied to be Claire's children Nathan (a.k.a. Tommy Clark) and Malina. She then committed suicide to shut down an evo tracking system. In the episode "June 13 — Part 1", she is encountered by Mohinder at the Odessa Peace Summit and he gives her a copy of his research on a coming disaster in case something happens to him. Molly survives the bombing and attempts to help Caspar Abraham locate Claire while Noah is distracted by chasing his own future self. Killed herself while her body was strapped.

==== Dale Smither ====
Dale Smither, portrayed by Rusty Schwimmer, is an auto mechanic with the ability of enhanced hearing; she constantly listens to rap music in order to drown out all the sounds which she is exposed to. In "Unexpected", she is contacted by Mohinder and Sylar (posing as Zane Taylor), and is subsequently murdered by Sylar.

==== Candice Wilmer ====
Candice Wilmer, portrayed by Missy Peregrym, is an agent of the Company who has the ability to create illusions. She appears in the first two volumes, Genesis and Generations. She can manipulate the appearance of her own body and a large area around herself, effectively trapping someone in these visuals if she wishes, and change any detail instantly. She is originally paired with Noah Bennet and is seen using her powers to taunt multiple characters. After Noah's betrayal of the Company is revealed at Candice's hands, she is seen operating on her own. She aides Mr. Linderman in the kidnapping of Micah Sanders in ".07%", and looks after Micah in "Landslide". In "How to Stop an Exploding Man", Candice is confronted and knocked out by Niki Sanders who, with D. L., came to New York for Micah. She is seen hinting at her true obese self in the episode "Landslide".

Candice, changing back from her illusion of Niki Sanders

=== Introduced in season 2 ===
==== Adam Monroe ====
Adam Monroe, also known as Takezo Kensei (剣聖 武蔵, Kensei Takezō) in feudal Japan, portrayed by David Anders, has the power of rapid cellular regeneration, allowing him to heal almost instantly from most injuries. The character first appears in the second-season episode "Four Months Later...", although the legend of Kensei is referenced several times during the first season. His regenerative ability has halted his aging, making him centuries old in the present of the series. He is the primary antagonist during the second season.

Due to his regenerative ability, he lived for a long time, being a legend in feudal Japan, where he meets Hiro Nakamura. Monroe creates the Company about three hundred years after his first encounter with Hiro Nakamura. As shown in "Truth & Consequences", when the Company began research into the Shanti virus, he attempted to release a highly virulent strain, claiming that something needs to be done about the endless cycle of destruction humanity seems to go through. Adam is locked away by Kaito Nakamura, never to be released again. After escaping and teaming up with Peter Petrelli they make it into the vault where the virus is kept ("Powerless"). While Adam goes to retrieve the virus, Peter is confronted by Nathan Petrelli and Matt Parkman, who tell him that Adam is using him. Hiro teleports to the vault and confronts Adam. He claims that he "should have killed him long ago" before teleporting both of them away. When Ando asks Hiro if he killed Adam, Hiro responds that Adam can never harm anyone again. It is then shown that Adam has been buried alive in a Japanese cemetery near Kaito Nakamura screaming for Hiro to let him out.

In the final moments of "I Am Become Death", Hiro and Ando dig Adam up in hopes of gaining information on the formula. In the following episode, he is released from his casket prison under the pretense that he will assist Hiro and Ando in retrieving the formula. When confronted later by Arthur Petrelli, he steals Adam's power of regeneration and heals himself. After having his power drained by Arthur, Adam seems to rapidly age, then crumbles to dust.

==== Bob Bishop ====
Robert Bishop, portrayed by Stephen Tobolowsky, has the ability of alchemy, allowing him to change the atomic properties of objects into materials such as gold. This can also be used as an offensive weapon; in one instance he turns a man's arm into gold, not only rendering it useless but also causing great pain. Known as Bob to his colleagues, he is one of the twelve members of the group established by Adam Monroe thirty years prior to the events of Kirby Plaza. He directs much of the tracking and capture of targets of the Company and he is their financial source, using his ability to create unlimited amounts of gold and other "resources". Following the death of Linderman at the end of Volume One, he takes over as head of the Company. He is also Elle's father, and though she was trained to work for the Company from birth, he constantly criticizes her actions. Bob is killed by Sylar at the beginning of Volume Three. It is revealed in "1961" that he met Angela Petrelli, Daniel Linderman, and Charles Deveaux while a "prisoner" at Coyote Sands.

==== Alejandro Herrera ====
Alejandro Herrera, portrayed by Shalim Ortiz, is the twin brother of Maya Herrera. Alejandro has the ability to absorb and neutralize his sister's poison emission; to do so, he must make physical contact with Maya and calm her down. He is very protective of her even after the initial manifestation of Maya's power kills their friends and his new wife in his native Dominican Republic. When she runs away, he tracks her down and discovers his ability to stop the progression of the poison she emits. They flee the police through Mexico, trying to get to New York in the hope that Mohinder can cure her. Along the way they meet Sylar, who joins them. Maya trusts Sylar, but Alejandro does not, and when Alejandro reveals his intention to force Maya to leave with him, Sylar kills him.

==== Maury Parkman ====
Maury Parkman, portrayed by Alan Blumenfeld, is Matt Parkman's father, who abandoned Matt when he was thirteen. He is one of the twelve founders of the Company and, like his son, Maury is a telepath; however, his powers are much more developed than Matt's. Instead of just reading surface thoughts, he can read people's memories and manipulate their perceptions of reality, allowing him to trap people in nightmares based on their deepest fears and insecurities.

==== Victoria Pratt ====
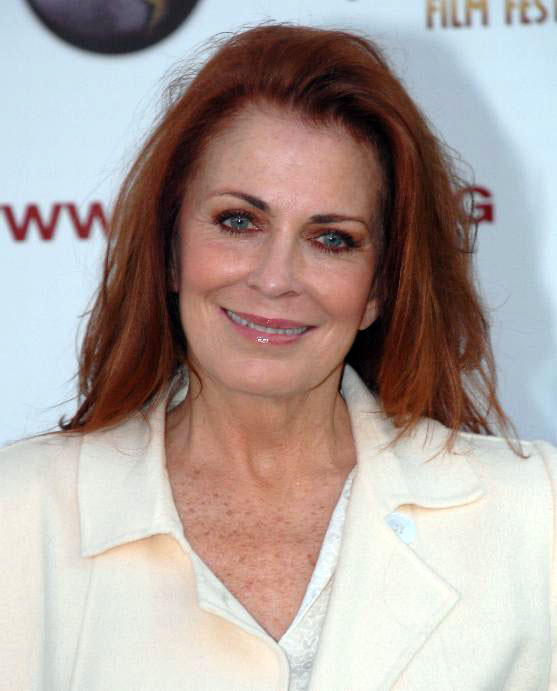
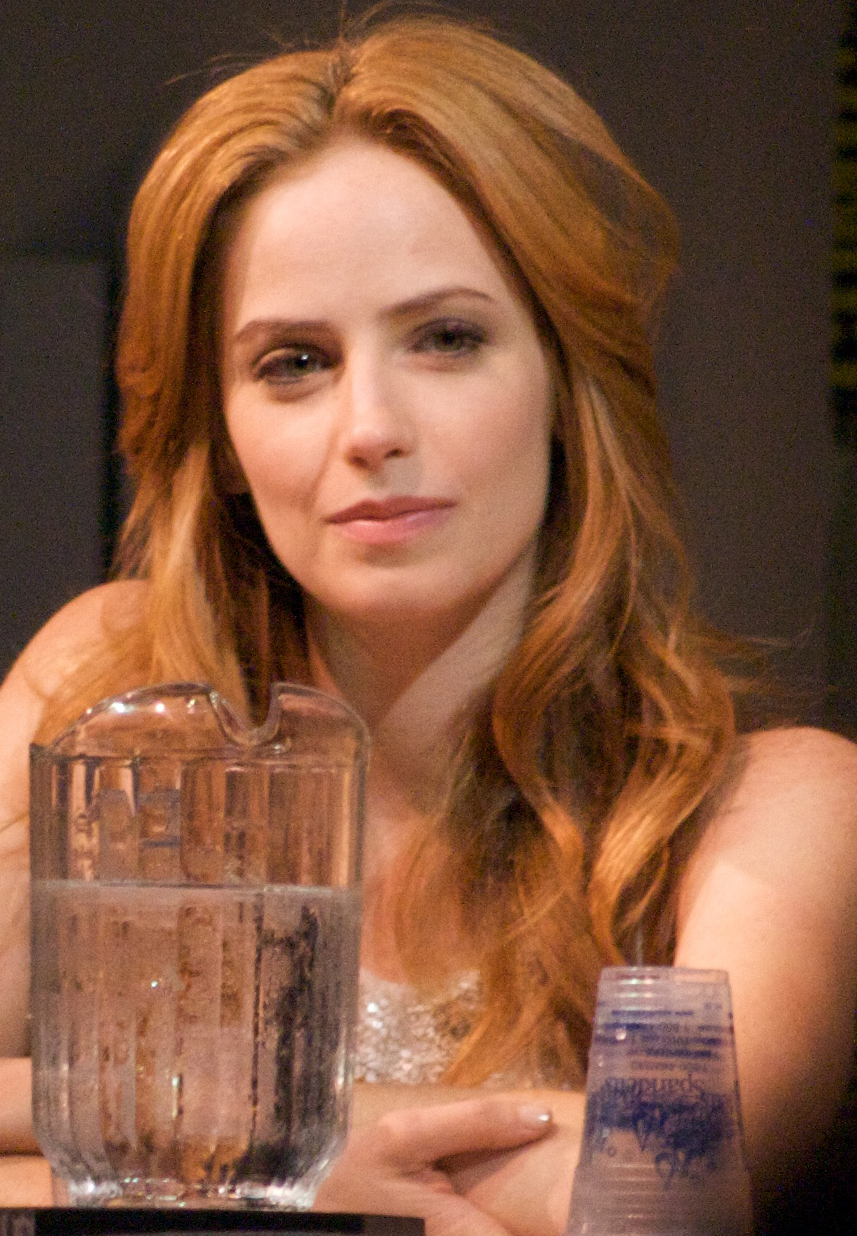
Joanna Cassidy (left, 2007) and Jaime Ray Newman (right, 2009)

Victoria Pratt, portrayed by Joanna Cassidy and Jaime Ray Newman, was a founding member of the Company and biological engineer. In 1977, she met Shanti Suresh and began to do research on the Shanti virus. On Company orders, she experimented on the virus, and weaponized it, creating Strain 138, which is capable of killing 93% of the world's population, including both humans and posthumans. When Monroe attempted to steal the strain, Pratt insisted that the program on the virus be stopped, and the strain destroyed. Kaito Nakamura and the other founders did not agree and locked the virus away at Primatech Paper in Odessa, Texas. Pratt was not happy about the decision. She is killed by Monroe in her house.

==== West Rosen ====
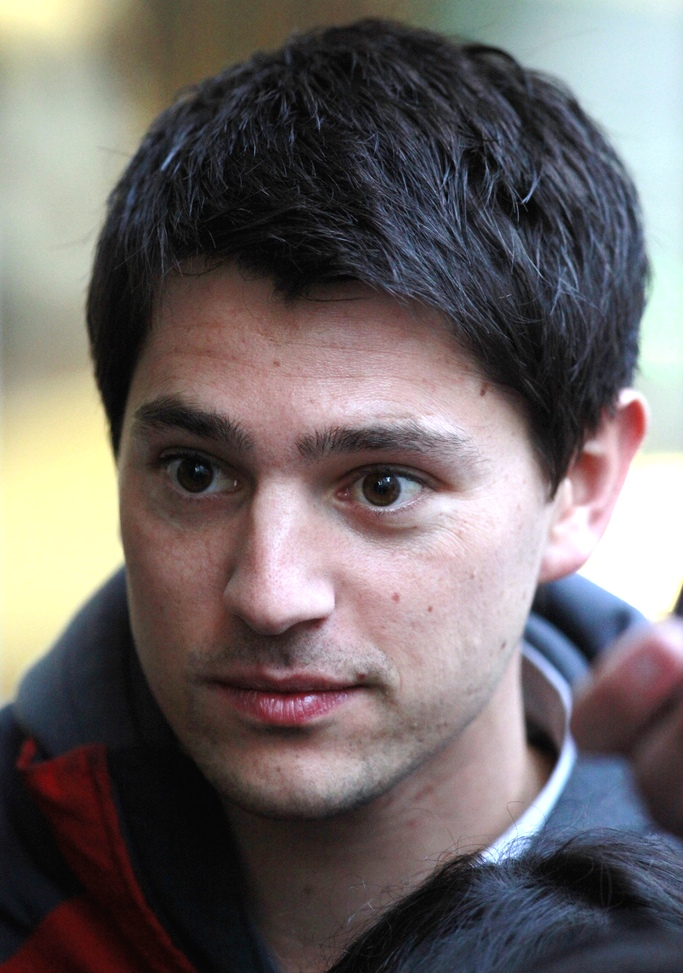
Nicholas D'Agosto (2010)

West Rosen, portrayed by Nicholas D'Agosto, has the ability to fly. He was abducted by Mr. Bennet and the Haitian for examination prior to the start of the series, though he tried to escape. He saw Mr. Bennet before being recaptured and having his memory wiped, though he still remembers Bennet's glasses. Years later, he and Claire become classmates at Costa Verde High School. They date in season 2 with West eventually learning the truth about his kidnapping. He and Noah Bennet later team up to save Claire, but West breaks up with her when she wants to reveal her powers. In "Let It Bleed", Claire tells Peter that she and West are now Facebook friends and she calls West so Peter can copy his power as a way of remembering Nathan.

=== Introduced in season 3 ===
==== Bridget Bailey ====
Bridget Bailey, introduced by the BBC in its mirror of Heroes 360 information and portrayed by Tehmina Sunny, has the ability of psychometry. Her exchanges with Mohinder Suresh were later included on NBC.com as part of Heroes Evolutions. Her first message, entitled "I need some advice", began on July 11, 2007.

==== Luke Campbell ====
Luke Campbell, portrayed by Dan Byrd, is a teenage boy with the ability to project microwave beams from his hands. He embarked on a road trip with Sylar in order to find Sylar's biological father. The effects of his power vary from object to object. He is able to melt a figurine, boil liquid from a distance without damaging the mug, and burn a person to death from the inside out.

==== Eric Doyle ====
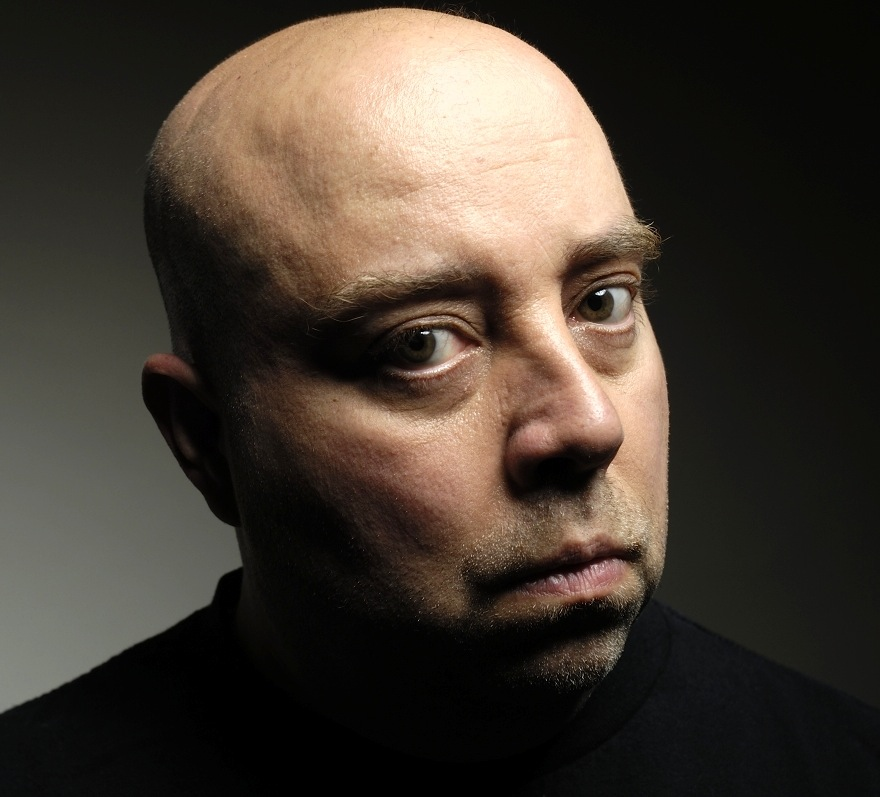
David H. Lawrence XVII (2007)

Eric Doyle, portrayed by David H. Lawrence XVII, has the ability of to control the actions of others by manipulating them like a puppeteer. In the webseries "Nowhere Man" he displays control over inanimate objects by closing a door without touching it. He is initially captured by the Company after causing people to seemingly commit suicide with his ability. He later escapes during the confrontation between Elle and Sylar, and returns to running "Doyle's Marionette Theater". He has obsessive romantic feelings for Meredith Gordon, which are renewed after she goes to him fearing that Claire is going to attempt to capture him. Doyle is eventually recaptured after forcing Meredith, Claire and Sandra Bennet to play a variation of Russian roulette, not knowing about Claire's ability. In "Dual", he is freed by Noah Bennet along with two others and offered freedom for killing Sylar. He attempts to save Meredith, but Sylar breaks free of his control and incapacitates him. During "Redemption" he goes back to his old ways and forces Emma Coolidge to use her powers to draw thousands of innocent people to the Carnival to be murdered by Samuel. Following a prophetic dream by Peter, Sylar confronts Eric to save Emma, but falls under his control. However, Eric makes the mistake of partially releasing his control over Emma to taunt her about her deafness and she hits him with a sonic blast, breaking his control over Sylar. Sylar pins Eric, but ties him up in lights rather than kill him as he has now turned to the side of good with Peter's help.

==== The German ====
The German, portrayed by Ken Lally, has the ability of magnetism manipulation, allowing him to control ferrous objects and materials. He is originally introduced in the graphic novel "Berlin, Part 1", where he is captured by the Company. He subsequently escapes Level 5 in "The Butterfly Effect" along with a dozen other prisoners, and joins a group of them in robbing a bank. In "One of Us, One of Them", he is killed by Knox after disagreeing with his plan.

==== Flint Gordon, Jr. ====
Flint Gordon Jr., portrayed by Blake Shields, is Meredith Gordon's younger brother, who also possesses the power of pyrokinesis. He produces extremely hot blue flames as opposed to Meredith's orange flames. He is slow-witted, causing him to be more of a lackey than a leader, especially when around Meredith; nevertheless, he is gleefully violent, cruel, and sadistic, and openly revels in using his powers to hurt people. He and Meredith were separated as children after Meredith accidentally used her ability to burn down their abusive father's house.

==== Samson Gray ====
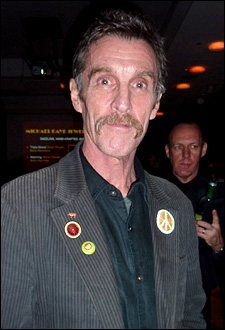
John Glover (2009)

Samson Gray, portrayed by John Glover, is the biological father of Sylar (Gabriel Gray). Like his son, he possesses the ability of intuitive aptitude, allowing him to steal the abilities of other super-powered humans. He is responsible for the death of Gabriel's mother back in 1980. Appearing in "Shades of Gray', he is old and dying of terminal cancer, hiding from Nathan's agents in an old trailer in the woods of Newark, New Jersey.

==== Knox ====
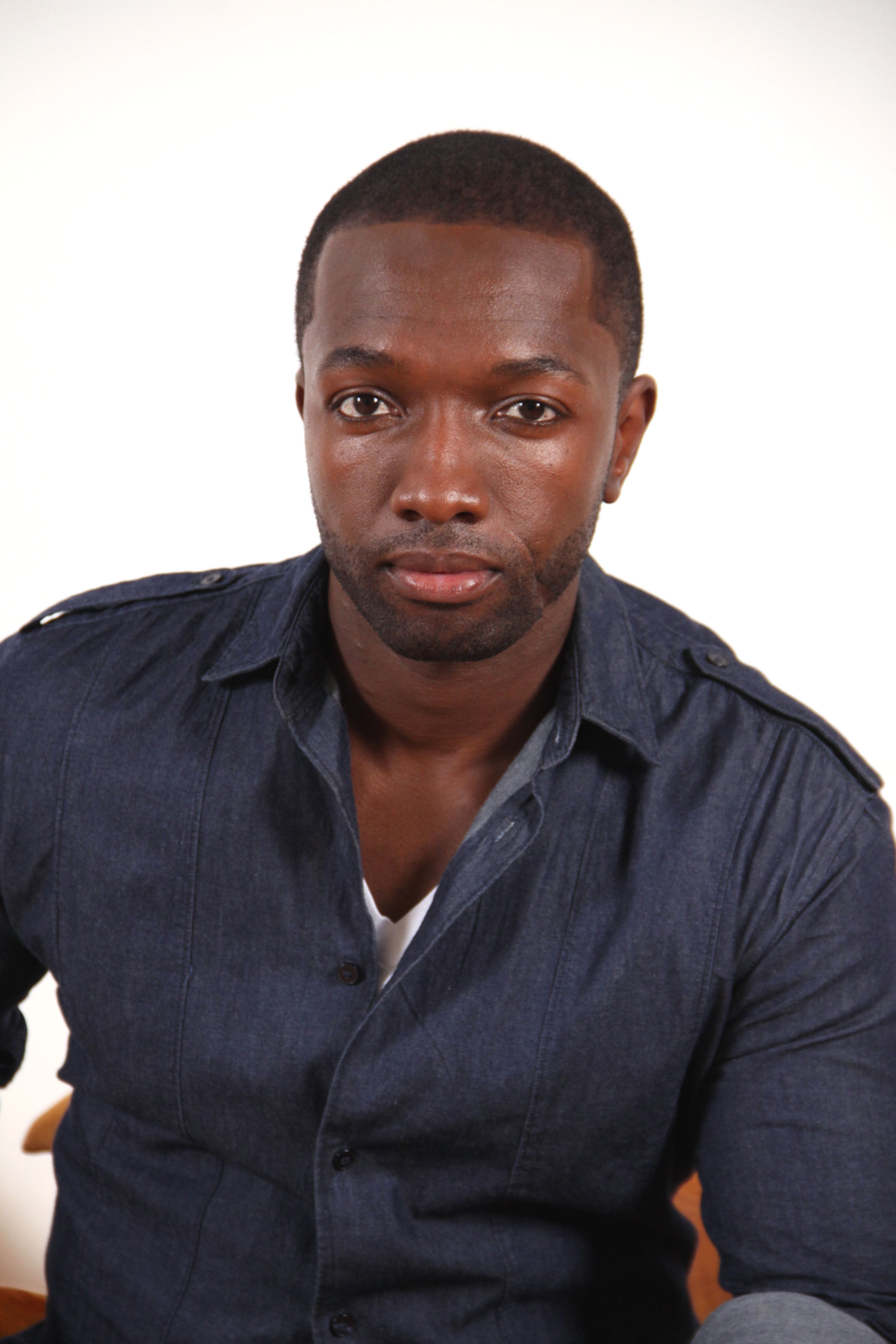
Jamie Hector (2012)

Benjamin "Knox" Washington, portrayed by Jamie Hector, gains enhanced strength when others around him are frightened. He often uses the threat of becoming stronger to fuel the fears of others. His past was going to be featured in a dropped storyline in "Villains" where he attempts to get out of gang life with the help of Matt Parkman, returning to his old ways after his power manifests; it was later released as the webseries Hard Knox. He is initially a Level 5 prisoner who escapes after the conflict between Sylar and Elle. He joins with the others to hunt down Noah Bennet, though he eventually ends up working for Arthur Petrelli. He teams up with Peter and Flint to destroy the Formula, killing a Marine guarding Nathan and keeping him captive to buy Peter time. However, Nathan attacks him and during the fight, Tracy Strauss freezes Knox solid and shatters him, killing Knox.

==== James Martin ====
James Martin possesses the ability to shapeshift into the form of anyone he touches. He is responsible for killing three of Danko's agents, who were hunting him. Using his ability, he makes his way into Danko's office to touch him in order to "borrow" his form.

==== Daphne Millbrook ====
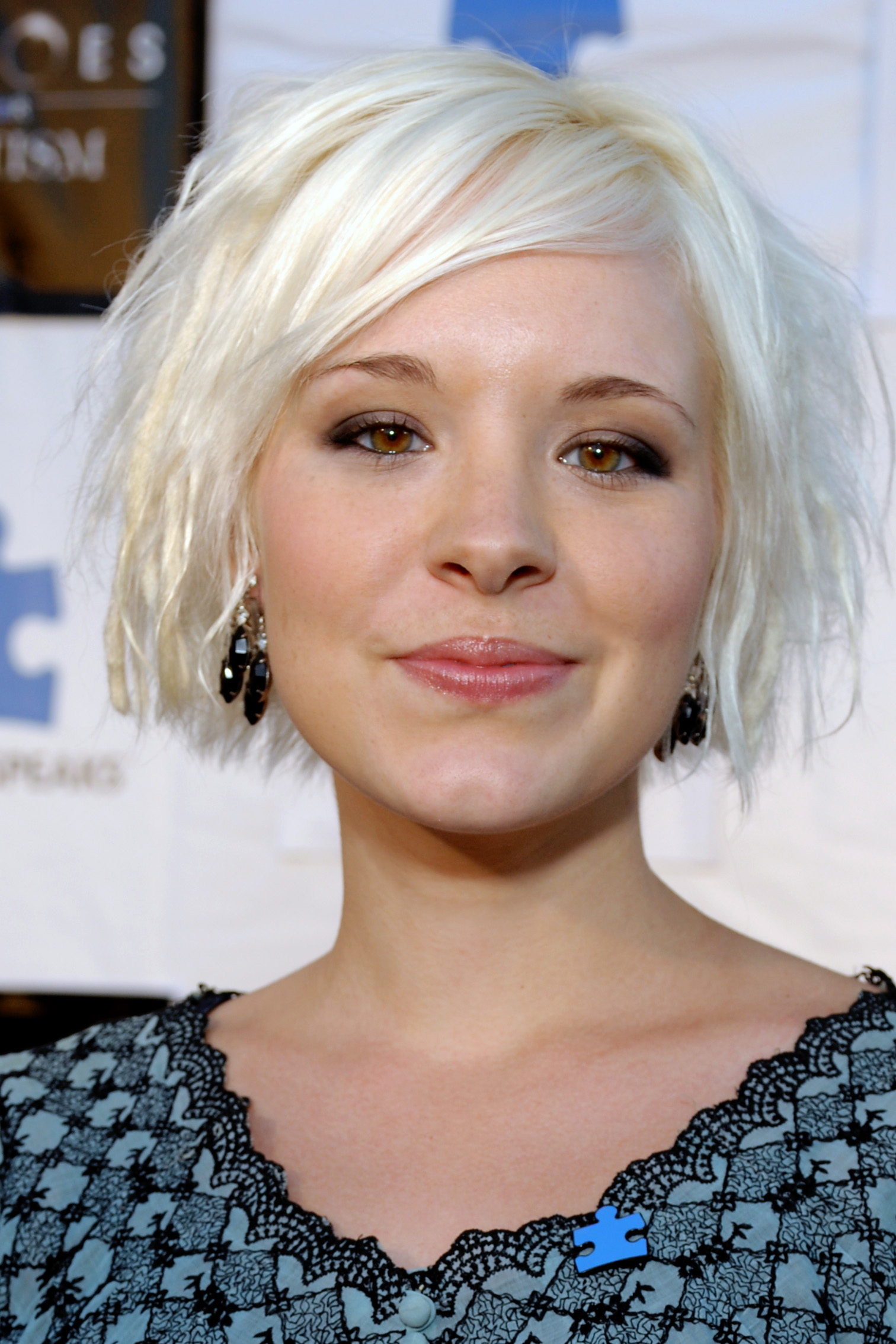
Brea Grant (2009)

Daphne Millbrook, portrayed by Brea Grant, is a thief with the power of enhanced speed. She can move herself at speeds fast enough to just barely outrun a nuclear explosion, move fast enough to be at normal speed when Hiro Nakamura slows down time to the point where time appears to have stopped, and can extend her ability to those she is in contact with. She has cerebral palsy and relied on crutches and braces to walk before gaining her powers. She first becomes acquainted with Hiro Nakamura, who refers to her as "nemesis", after she steals his half of a chemical formula that gives ordinary people super powers. She works for the Pinehearst Company under the direction of Maury Parkman (who appears to her as Mr. Linderman), charged with recruiting members. Daphne eventually switches sides and helps rescue Hiro from the past. Afterwards, she and Hiro steal and destroy the Formula and she tries to make a life with Matt Parkman. During "Trust and Blood", Daphne is shot and apparently killed. She is revealed to be alive, though seriously wounded during "Cold Wars". She is rescued in "Cold Snap" and taken to the hospital where she is treated for her gunshot wound and an infection. She apparently recovers and takes off to Paris, but quickly realizes it's a dream where Matt is giving her a happy ending. Knowing she will die, she asks Matt to fly her to the Moon. He does so in the dream as she dies of her injuries in the real world.

==== Jesse Murphy ====
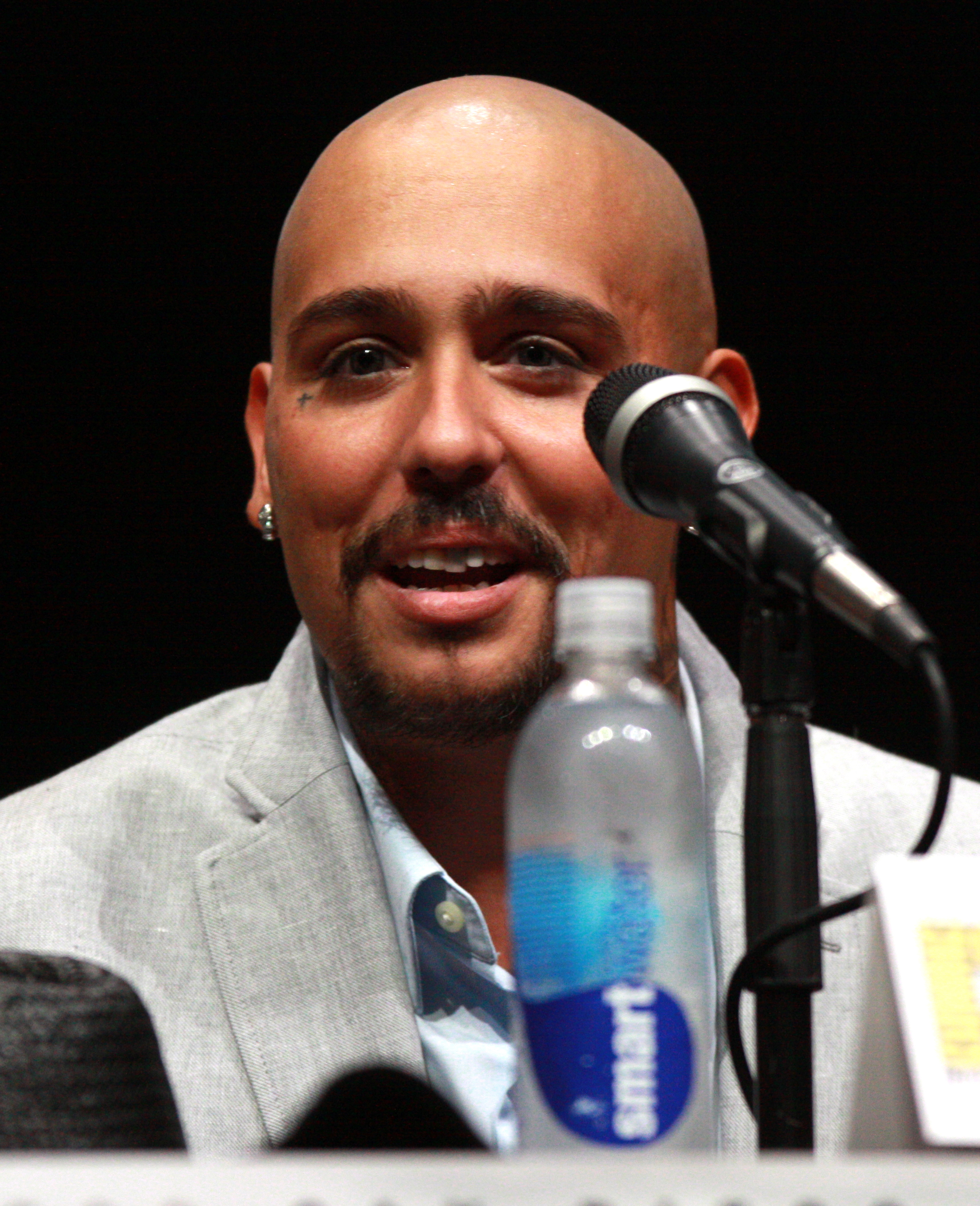
Francis Capra (2013)

Jesse Murphy, portrayed by Francis Capra, is a former prisoner of Level 5 with the ability to produce powerful sonic waves with his voice. According to executive producer Greg Beeman, Jesse's power was originally "Earthquake-stomp", but was changed due to budget constraints. He is described by Knox as having no friends. He and Knox were captured by Noah Bennet and the Haitian after the two used their powers in an attempt to take over a neighborhood.

==== Ishi Nakamura ====
Ishi Nakamura, portrayed by Tamlyn Tomita, was the wife of Kaito Nakamura and mother to Kimiko and Hiro. She was shown as deceased when Hiro was eight years old when he went back in time with his father in an attempt to convince him to escape his death. It was revealed that she had an ability in an interview with Aron Coleite and Joe Pokaski, which is shown to be the ability to heal living organisms through kisses in "Our Father". She revives Hiro's sick bird and restores the future Hiro's lost memories.

==== Matt Parkman, Jr. ====
Matthew "Matty" Parkman, Jr. is the infant son of Matt Parkman and his ex-wife Janice Parkman, and the grandson of Maury Parkman. He has the ability to activate and deactivate objects, whether they are electronic, mechanical, or even human, earning him the nickname "Toddler Touch-And-Go" from Hiro. He is first mentioned in the episode "Five Years Gone", his father working to capture other posthumans in exchange for the protection of him. Matt Parkman, Jr. later appears in the main timeline, living in California with his mother. Matt Senior divorces his wife because they initially believe Matt Junior is the son of the man she cheated on him with, but it turns out they were wrong. He restores Hiro Nakamura's powers when they meet and the truth of his parentage brings his parents back together.

==== Arthur Petrelli ====
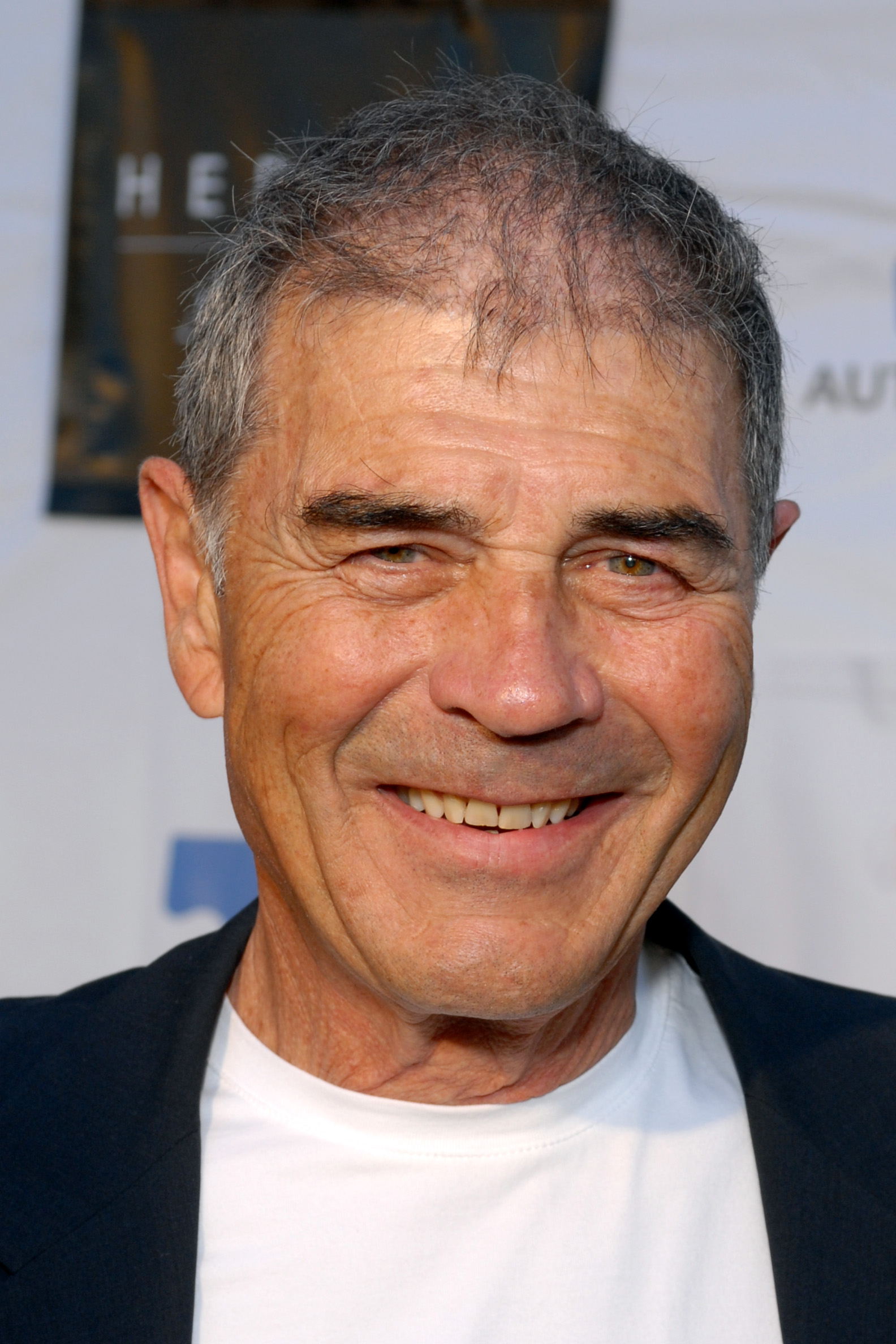
Robert Forster (2009)

Arthur Petrelli, portrayed by Robert Forster, is the husband of Angela Petrelli, the father of Nathan Petrelli and Peter Petrelli, and the biological grandfather of Claire Bennet. Angela has stated that she and Arthur have gone through "great lengths" to protect Claire. He has the power to take the abilities of other evolved humans through physical contact. Once he takes an ability, he cannot return it. The powers he has taken are telepathy from an unknown source, though hinted at being Charles Deveaux; the regenerative abilities of Adam Monroe (which killed Adam, as he immediately aged 400+ years and crumbled into dust); Peter's empathic mimicry and the powers he'd absorbed as a result (including the Haitian's mental manipulation); Maya Herrera's poison emission; and Hiro Nakamura's time manipulation. Arthur's range of powers is such that he can overcome the Haitian's dampening powers after a short period, though not without significant effort. Hiro eventually learns through a "spirit walk" that Arthur was actually the one who'd ordered Nathan's accident, not Linderman, and that Arthur had repeatedly manipulated Angela's mind throughout their marriage, to get her to do what he wanted. After Linderman revealed the truth to her, Angela tried to kill Arthur by poisoning him, but he was saved by Nathan arriving home and calling 911. Arthur survived the poisoning attempt, but was completely paralyzed and could only communicate through telepathy, so he faked his own death. After stealing Adam Monroe's regenerative powers, Arthur was able to heal the damage the poison had done to his body, recovering completely. In "Our Father", Peter and the Haitian confront Arthur with the intention of killing him. Arthur offers to use the Formula to restore Peter's powers if his son comes with him, but Peter refuses. As the Haitian loses his grip on Arthur's powers, Peter fires a gun at Arthur who is only saved by the timely intervention of Sylar. However, Sylar only saved him to discover if Arthur is actually his father or not. Using his new lie detection abilities, Sylar is able to tell that Arthur in fact lied to him. Telling Peter "you're not a killer, Peter...but I am", Sylar telekinetically shoves Peter's bullet through Arthur's head, destroying the spot that controls regeneration and killing Arthur. The Formula's catalyst dies with him.

==== Daniel Pine ====
Daniel Pine, portrayed by Franc Ross, is a Vietnam veteran with the ability to transform parts of his body into metal. He is introduced in "Villains", being captured by Agent Thompson and Meredith Gordon as the latter's first assignment in the Company. He is placed in Level 5, but escapes when Elle Bishop accidentally sets all the Level 5 prisoners free. From there, he returns to his old home, and ends up killing his ex-wife. He is then recaptured by Meredith and Noah Bennet.

==== Baron Samedi ====
Baron Samedi, portrayed by Demetrius Grosse, is a powerful warlord in the jungles of Haiti, and is the half-brother of the Haitian. He possesses impenetrable skin, which grants him a degree of invulnerability from trauma such as fire, knives, and bullets. He shares a name with a loa.

==== Scott ====
Scott, portrayed by Chad Faust, is a Marine recruited by the Pinehearst Company. Wanting to be more than human so that he can make up for his fellow Marines that died, he is the first person to try the newly perfected formula, which grants him the ability of enhanced strength. As he is about to stop Flint Gordon and Peter Petrelli from destroying the lab and the formula in "Dual", his neck is snapped by Knox.

==== Alice Shaw ====
Alice Shaw, played by Laura Marano in flashbacks and by Diana Scarwid in the present, is the estranged younger sister of Angela Petrelli, the aunt of Nathan Petrelli and Peter Petrelli, and the great-aunt of Claire Bennet. She has the ability of weather manipulation. Her powers are seemingly linked to her emotions as she is able to summon gale force winds when frightened, or generate lightning bolts or hailstones when angered. She first appears in the flashback in episode "1961".

==== Usutu ====
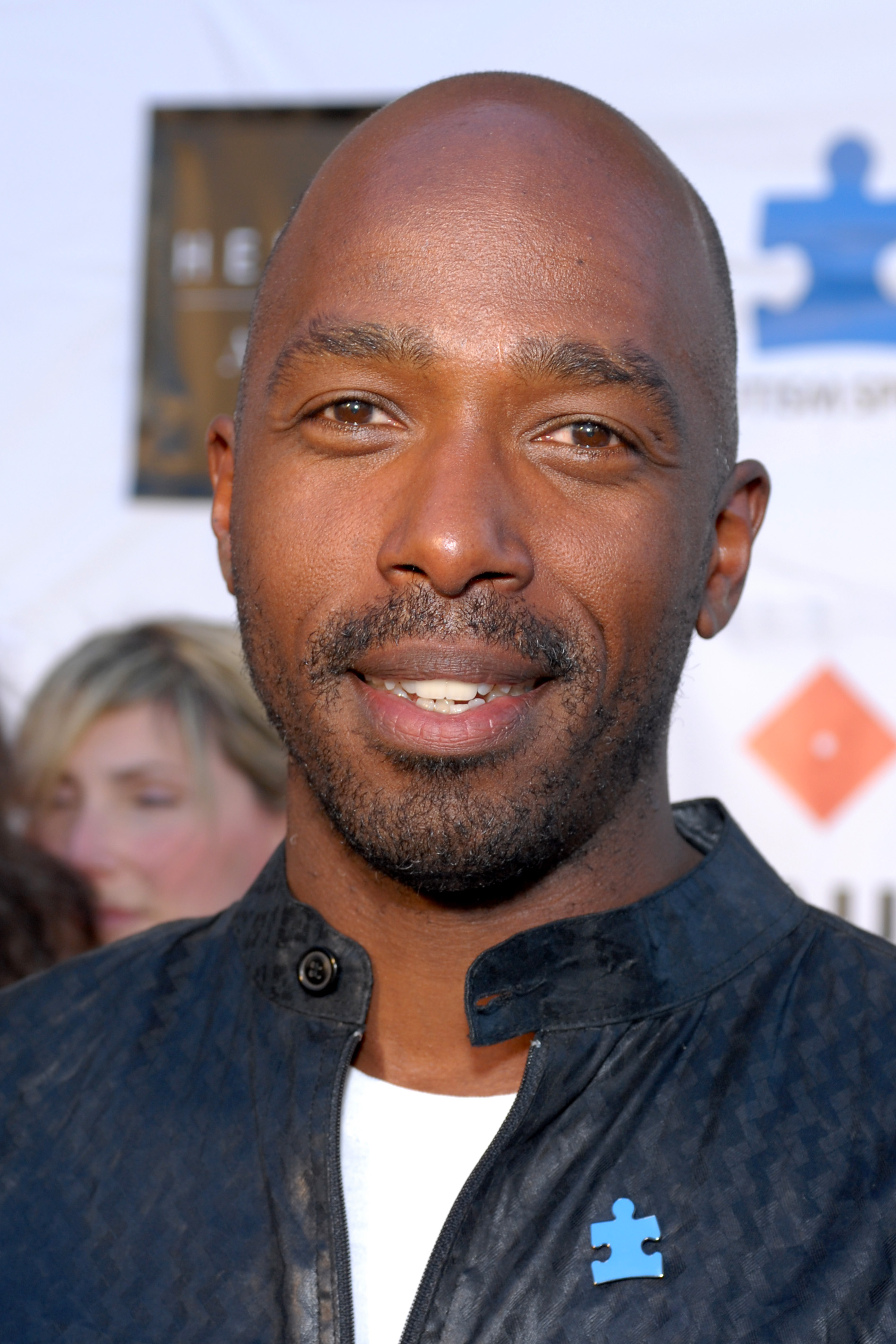
Ntare Guma Mbaho Mwine (2009)

Usutu, portrayed by Ntare Guma Mbaho Mwine, makes himself known to Matt after he is teleported to Africa by the future Peter Petrelli. He had painted an image of the earth exploding on a nearby rock. This image appears several times in the episodes "The Second Coming" and "The Butterfly Effect", painted on various objects in various places. He also seems to have an extensive knowledge of Matt's life, having painted the major events of Matt's story arc in Volume One when he was just a child. Like the precognition demonstrated by Isaac Mendez (which is also why Hiro refers to him as "Mr. African Isaac"), this skill can be activated at will, though Usutu prefers to listen to music while he works. In a discussion with Parkman, Usutu reveals that he is aware of various changes in the timeline, specifically events that change his earlier predictions. As Hiro finishes his own spirit journey, Usutu is decapitated by Arthur Petrelli, and later appears in a vision in "Dual".

==== Alex Woolsley ====
Alex Woolsley, portrayed by Justin Baldoni, is an employee at Sam's Comic Book Shop with the ability to breathe underwater. He first discovered his ability while on his high school's swim team. He is rescued by Claire Bennet on orders of the mysterious Rebel, and secretly took up residence within the Bennet household. Eventually, Claire's mother finds out about his hiding in their house and she helps him change his identity to protect him. During his stay at the Bennet household, Claire and he develop a mutual romantic interest, culminating in a kiss while they hide from government agents underwater in a pool (thus also allowing Alex to transfer air to her thanks to his ability, removing the need for them to surface to breathe). In the graphic novel "The Scenic Route", he is rescued again, this time by Noah Bennet and Claire's ex-boyfriend West Rosen, and both boys are advised to lie low.

=== Introduced in season 4 ===
==== Arnold ====
Arnold, portrayed by Jack Wallace, has the ability of space-time manipulation. Introduced in "Orientation", he is shown as a member of the "Sullivan Bros. Carnival", and as any member, is considered family. He is asked by Samuel Sullivan to send him 14 years back in time so he can meet the adult Hiro Nakamura, which he is capable of doing despite his bad health. He is shown as an old and dying man, and it is implied that Samuel intends to replace him with Hiro. In "Once Upon a Time in Texas", Arnold once again sends Samuel back in time to find Hiro; after Hiro saves Charlie from Sylar and her aneurysm, Samuel orders Arnold to take her to the carnival in present and then to hide her somewhere in time away from Hiro so he will stay with them. This final effort killed Arnold. In the graphic Novel "Smoke and Mirrors", an altar is seen in honor of Arnold as the carnies discuss about Samuel forcing Arnold to use his ability without any concern about his health. Hiro eventually reunites with an old Charlie who tells him that Arnold took her to Milwaukee on January 26, 1944. Though Hiro offers to go back and retrieve her after Arnold leaves, Charlie refuses as she had a life there and Hiro respects her wishes.

==== Bowman Family ====
The Bowman Family consists of Chris Bowman, portrayed by Daryl Crittenden, with his wife Gail and daughter Jenny, who are workers at the "Sullivan Bros. Carnival" as part of the fire-breathing family. The three of them exhibit the ability to breathe fire; Chris and Gail exhibit orange flames, but little Jenny exhibits blue ones (in main series she exhibits orange flames as well). Although seen in background as member of the "family" since "Orientation", they are shown mainly in iStories (Faction Zero and Slow Burn). In "Strange Attractors" (Slow Burn iStory chapter 5) they are told by Samuel Sullivan to show their ability to Tracy so she will feel comfortable at the carnival, but she felt the other way around so they stop. In the graphic novel "Smoke and Mirrors", Amanda watches as the Bowman family practices their fire-breathing act making her want to be a Bowman herself.

==== Emma Coolidge ====
Emma Coolidge, portrayed by Deanne Bray, is a deaf woman working in the same hospital as Peter. Dialogue indicates that she is trained as a physician, but prefers to work archiving patients' data instead of treating them. In the episode "Ink", she discovers that she can perceive sound as a form of colored light; the louder the sound, the more intense and colorful the light. Her doctor (also her mother) suggests that this is a form of synesthesia (mixed signals from the different senses). At the park, she sees the music a cello player produces, and then starts playing it herself, producing beautiful music. She constantly uses headphones in public to avoid being asked anything, so people will not notice that she is deaf. In the episode "Hysterical Blindness", Emma discovers that she is able to convert sound into physical force after damaging her apartment walls while playing a cello once more; the cello was in a box with the "Sullivan Bros. Carnival" label on it. In "Tabula Rasa", she is afraid of her power and seeks Peter to help her ultimately Hiro helps her understand that her ability is a gift, and once she knows what she can do, she can use it to do good things. As Peter and Emma learn that Hiro is dying, Emma makes him promise he will stay in bed, although he constantly tells Emma he feels alive when he uses his ability and he will die with dignity like Charlie intended to do.

==== Damien ====
Damien, portrayed by Harry Perry, is a carnival worker at "Sullivan Bros. Carnival", introduced in "Tabula Rasa", with the ability to restore, heal and distort other people's memories. By orders of Samuel, he takes Sylar to the center chamber of the Hall of Mirrors and touches his head using his ability on him. Then, he leaves Sylar alone while he sees his real memories reflecting in every mirror. In "Thanksgiving", he is present during Thanksgiving dinner; after Edgar's escape, he surprises Hiro while talking to Samuel, disrupting his memories, but apparently in a way he did not expect (which is also seen in the graphic novel "The Trip, Part 1"). In "The Art of Deception", he helps Samuel to step over the dying Lydia.

==== Edgar ====
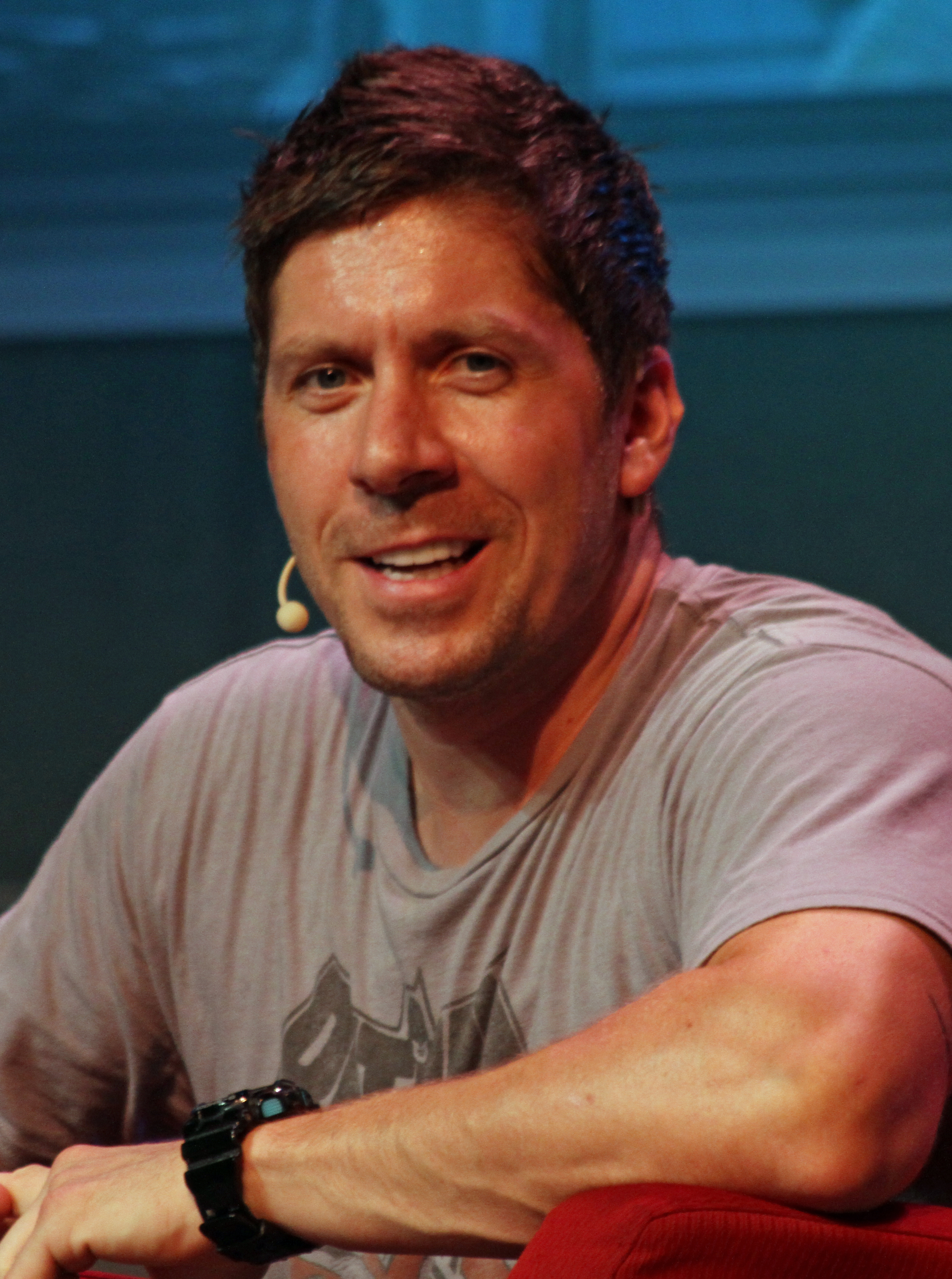
Ray Park (2011)

Edgar, portrayed by Ray Park, has the ability of enhanced speed and works at the "Sullivan Bros. Carnival". Introduced in "Orientation", he is sent by Samuel Sullivan to kill Emile Danko in order to retrieve a mysterious compass. At first he refuses, stating that he does not kill unless absolutely necessary. Samuel chokes him (with a tattoo hand controlled by his power), but releases him with a promise to not force Edgar again after he does this task. Edgar fails once, as Danko does not have the artifact with him and Tracy manages to freeze his knife and arm; he fails again when Peter Petrelli mimics his ability. He goes after Noah Bennet and finally takes the compass to Samuel, leaving Noah badly wounded. After Lydia learns the truth of Joseph's murder with the help of Hiro Nakamura, Edgar tries to expose Samuel who frames him as the murderer. Samuel tries to kill Edgar, but Hiro saves him and convinces Edgar to flee rather than kill Samuel to help stop him later. He's eventually captured by Noah who Lauren Gilmore gets to talk to Edgar rather than torture him. Edgar initially agrees to work with Noah to stop Samuel, but after Noah shows little care for the other carnies, Edgar takes the information he gave Noah and takes off. Edgar returns after Lydia's murder and rejoins the Carnival, but while he's seemingly accepted back, he remains aware of what Samuel is capable of and is disturbed by what Samuel is planning. In "Brave New World", he kidnaps Noah Bennet in Central Park and tells him he wants to stop Samuel, but can't just kill him in front of everyone. Edgar figures Noah has a plan and he aids Noah, Claire and Eli in exposing Samuel's actions to the carnies. Afterwards, Edgar helps the carnies leave and is teleported away by Hiro to safety, rendering Samuel effectively powerless.

==== Eli ====
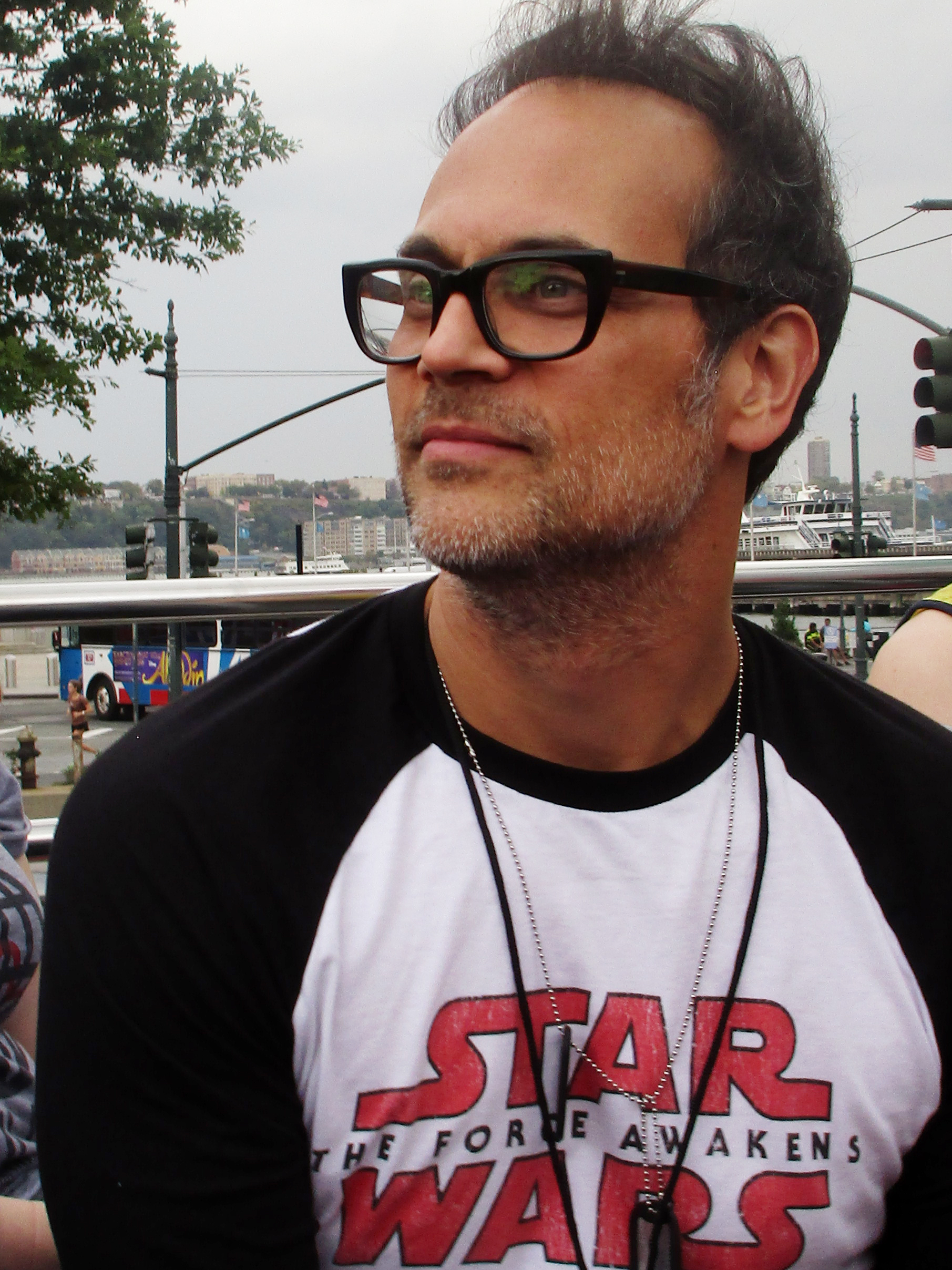
Todd Stashwick (2015)

Eli, portrayed by Todd Stashwick, is a thief and diamond-mine owner who is found by Tracy Strauss (following orders from Samuel Sullivan) in a cruise in the southwestern coast of Africa in the graphic novel "Prodigals, Part 1: Immersed". Tracy interrupts his way into a girl and accidentally reveals the money he has stolen from a tourist, and then Eli takes out a gun. When Tracy recognizes Eli, he gets angry and distrustful to hear she knows his real name, and creates many clones to surround Tracy. Unknowing what she meant about the carnival, "they" shoot Tracy, also unaware that her abilities will allow her to survive and fight back. The original Eli is already in a boat escaping, and Tracy knows she must follow him to the open sea. In "Prodigals, Part 2: Witch Hunt", Tracy is tracking down the root Eli at Cape Town and in the process ends up killing many of his clones. After understanding how Eli and clones move around, Eli surprises her at his diamond mine where his clones work. Instead of killing her when having a chance, he decides to receive her and show her the place. In "Prodigals, Part 3: Parched", Tracy is seen fighting against a horde of clones while the root Eli stands quietly. After learning Samuel is the actual leader of the carnival, he agrees to return, as it was Joseph who exiled him but always was loyal to Samuel. Upon his return to the Carnival, he acts as Samuel's right-hand man with the power of cloning, but displays the weakness that if the original is knocked out or killed, the clones will all disappear. His clones lack a mind of their own as well, making Matt Parkman's telepathy useless on them. In "The Art of Deception" he murders Lydia to enable Samuel's plans. In "The Wall" and "Brave New World" Eli is sent to kill Matt Parkman, Peter Petrelli and Sylar to stop their interfering in Samuel's plans. Dialogue between Eli and Matt indicates that while Eli will go along with Samuel's terrible plans, he knows it is wrong. The Eli clones nearly kill Matt, but Peter and Sylar are able to overpower the clones sent after them and knock out the real Eli, saving Matt. Peter then reads Eli's mind to learn Samuel's plans and he and Sylar take off to stop them, leaving Eli with Matt who proceeds to use his powers to brainwash Eli against Samuel. Eli then returns to the Carnival and aids Edgar, Noah and Claire Bennet in exposing Samuel for what he really is, admitting to his murder of Lydia along the way. Eli's support of Claire's claims breaks the carnies faith in Samuel and causes them to leave him.

==== Ian Michaels ====
Ian Michaels, portrayed by Adam Lazarre-White, is a homeless man introduced in "Upon This Rock" who has the ability to control, manipulate, and accelerate plant growth. Originally, he was terrified by his ability and opted to hide in seclusion in Central Park. He was soon found by Samuel Sullivan and Emma Coolidge and shown the benefits of having an ability. He is now part of the "Sullivan Bros. Carnival".

==== Jeremy Greer ====
Jeremy Greer, portrayed by Mark L. Young, is an evolved human introduced in "Tabula Rasa", a teenager with the ability to control the life force of living creatures, so he can either heal them or kill them.

==== Lydia ====
Lydia, "The Painted Lady", is portrayed by Dawn Olivieri. Her ability is backfiring, making her susceptible to anyone else's desires, such as running away when her boyfriend wanted her to, and Carol's desire for Amanda to be hers, which led Lydia to abandon her baby with Carol. Lydia serves as the main antagonist, but not villain, of the Webseries: Slow Burn. While reluctantly trying to manipulate Sylar, he copies her powers harmlessly. Growing more and more suspicious of Samuel's activities, Lydia offers to help Hiro Nakamura find his lost love Charlie through her powers though she is unsuccessful. After learning of Samuel having Hiro return before he killed Mohinder Suresh but not to save Joseph Sullivan, Lydia asks Hiro to take her back in time eight weeks so she can see what really happened to Joseph. Though Hiro is reluctant, he eventually takes them back though he indicates Lydia may have triggered this with her own powers. The two witness Samuel confront Joseph about the full extent of his powers and then murder him in a rage. Lydia's gasp of shock draws Samuel's attention, but she is able to help Hiro transport them back to their own time. There, she reveals the truth to Edgar, resulting in Samuel pinning the murder on him and trying to kill Edgar. Hiro saves Edgar to Lydia's relief and she agrees to keep the truth secret to protect Amanda. Samuel later has Eli murder her to pin the crime on Noah Bennet and drive the Carnival into a frenzy after his destruction of a nearby town causes them to start to falter. Under Matt Parkman's brainwashing, Eli later admits to her murder and this, along with Edgar revealing what Lydia told him about Joseph's murder causes the carnies to abandon Samuel, allowing Peter Petrelli to defeat him.

==== Joseph Sullivan ====
Joseph Sullivan, portrayed by Andrew Connolly, was the leader of the "Sullivan Bros. Carnival", until his mysterious death. Seeing his burial in "Orientation" and being mentioned so many times, mainly by his brother Samuel, Lydia and Edgar, he is referred to as a kind and fair leader, with visions of family and peace far from Samuel's. As his rightful successor, Samuel tries to fill his void by adding new members to the family, although Lydia and Edgar say it was not Joseph's will (Acceptance). In the episode "Ink", Samuel reveals he and Joseph once lived and served at a mansion while kids. In the episode "Hysterical Blindness", Samuel chooses Sylar from a list of evolved humans as the one who will fill the void left by Joseph's death, although is unknown what ability Joseph held. In "Shadowboxing", Samuel states Danko is the one who killed Joseph and that's why he kept a compass hidden, Joseph's. In "Brother's Keeper" Joseph meets with Mohinder Suresh about his interest in Samuel eight weeks before the present of the episode. He asks Mohinder to forget the whole thing and to burn the film he has of Samuel's powers. However, unbeknownst to him, Samuel overhears part of the discussion and grows interested. In "Thanksgiving", a suspicious Lydia has Hiro Nakamura take her back in time eight weeks to witness Joseph's murder and discover the truth. The two witnesses Samuel and Joseph go into a field where Joseph reveals that Samuel's powers grow exponentially when surrounded by evos which is why he has limited the number of people in the Carnival. Knowing that Samuel is out of control, Joseph sent the compass to Danko so he could find them and arrest Samuel. Demanding to know more, Samuel propels a rock through Joseph's throat in a moment of rage, mortally wounding him. Joseph dies in his repentant brother's arms while Lydia's gasp nearly reveals herself and Hiro. Hiro manages to return them to the present in time to avoid the past Samuel, but the present day Samuel realizes what happened and pins the murder on Edgar who escapes with Hiro's help. During "Brave New World", Claire reveals the murder of Joseph to the carnies while trying to turn them against Samuel as an example of how out of control he's gotten. While Samuel denies the claim, Edgar backs Claire up and combined with Eli's confession to murdering Lydia on Samuel's orders, Joseph's murder causes the carnies to leave Samuel.

==== Rebecca Taylor ====
Rebecca "Becky" Taylor, portrayed by Tessa Thompson, possesses the power of invisibility. She is first introduced in "Hysterical Blindness" as a pledge master for a sorority on Claire Bennet's college campus. She is connected to the Sullivan Bros. Carnival by way of her "Uncle Samuel". It is revealed that she is the one responsible for the death of Claire's first roommate, Annie, and for fueling Claire's suspicion of Gretchen. When Claire and Gretchen are exploring the slaughterhouse as part of the hazing process, an invisible Becky attempts to kill Gretchen twice, but is thwarted by Claire at both turns. Becky exhibits her power in front of all four girls being hazed and is forced to flee after Claire hits her. It's revealed in "Shadowboxing" that Becky has an unpleasant past with Noah Bennet as he killed her father during a bag and tag mission for the Company; her fear towards Noah activating her invisibility.

=== Introduced in graphic novels ===
==== Bianca Karina ====
Bianca Karina is an agent of the Company who can adapt her lungs to enable her to breathe in any environment, including underwater. She is partnered with Devin Patterson and engaged to Gael Cruz. She is first seen in "Root and Branch, Part 1" when she and Patterson capture one of Julien Dumont's rogue clones. She is next seen in "Berlin", where she, Gael, and Devin are sent to capture the German. After Gael is incapacitated and Devin is killed, Bianca uses her ability to knock him out. With the help of Paul Harding and Ahlrich Dekker, they get the German to headquarters. At the end of the Evs Dropper arc, she defends Donna Dunlap from Gael, locking him in a cell. After Donna and Eric Thompson, identify Connie Logan as Evs Dropper, she is leads those sent to fight her. Once the majority of agents are killed, Bianca shoots the root Julien Dumont and all clones are killed. In "The Butterfly Effect" and "Dreams Until Death", she and Gael confront Sylar outside the Bennet house after he leaves having taken Claire Bennet's ability, and she is killed by Sylar after she and Gael attempt to capture him. However, Gael identifies himself as "special", so Bianca gets a quick death and her power is not taken.

=== Introduced in webisodes ===
==== Caleb ====
Caleb, portrayed by Dusty Sorg, is a worker at the "Sullivan Bros. Carnival" and loyal lackey of Samuel Sullivan who seems to monitor the activities within the "family", as he is seen spying and informing Samuel in webisodes and iStories (and even to Joseph in Bloodlines, Part 1). He is introduced in Slow Burn webisodes as he spies on Edgar and Lydia. Later, he befriends Lydia's daughter, Amanda, once she gets to the carnival. He has the ability to produce eight giant spider legs from his back that can be stretched. His eyes also shone green.

==== Echo DeMille ====
Echo DeMille, portrayed by Kiko Ellsworth, is a prisoner of Level 5 with the ability to manipulate sound. He was almost captured by the Constrictor and Howard, but used his power to escape. When the Constrictor later took his girlfriend hostage, Echo was forced to kill him. He took out another pair of agents making his escape. When trying to meet with his girlfriend, Echo used the brown note to avoid two more Company agents. He arranged to meet her thirteen weeks later at his family's cabin only to be ambushed by Penny and Connie Logan, Elle Bishop, and several other paired agents. Using his ability, he incapacitated all but one - a posthuman with the ability to absorb sound. The agent captured him, and Echo was detained to Level 5, where Angela Petrelli implied a former connection to him.

He also appeared in the TV series at the episode "Dual", wherein Sylar later puts the Company facility into lockdown, Noah releases Echo and the other recaptured prisoners, offering them freedom if they can kill Sylar. Echo is subsequently killed by Sylar, his throat slashed open.

==== Rachel Mills ====
Rachel Mills, portrayed by Taylor Cole, is the daughter of Leona Mills and a father with the ability to teleport. Rachel, as time passes, goes on a journey of self-exploration and is gradually drawn into the secret world of people with special powers, all beginning with the trauma of her mother's apparent suicide, which she never recovered from and eventually drove her to join the United States Marine Corps. After an experience in an unusual biological experimentation lab while serving as a USMC Corporal in Iraq, Rachel found her career at an end, and so was recruited by Pinehearst as part of their "super-soldier" program, agreeing to accept injections of Mohinder Suresh's experimental formula to fight a war against dangerous specials. During this she discovers she already has a power, having unknowingly developed her teleportation ability that she inherited from her father.

==== Amanda Strazzulla ====
Amanda Strazzulla, portrayed by Sasha Pieterse, is the daughter of Lydia who abandoned her because she was too young to raise her. She lives in New England with Lydia's sister Carol Strazzulla, and months ago manifested spontaneous combustion, the ability to explode things with the power of her mind, which caused her aunt to fear her, and also lured Noah Bennet and Meredith Gordon while they worked together for the Company during the Villains' arc (Boom). She is introduced in the main series in the episode "Thanksgiving" as part of the carnival family during the Thanksgiving dinner.

== Additional family of the main characters ==
This list includes every non-powered relative of the main characters.

=== Kate Bennet ===
Kate Bennet, portrayed by Sherri Saum, was Noah's first wife in 1985, seen in "The Wall", introduced as she revealed to Noah she was pregnant. That night both were assaulted by a telekinetic man named Richard who ended up killing Kate. This event triggered Noah's psychotic depression, paranoia and having investigations about posthumans and finally put him in the Company's way.

=== Lyle Bennet ===
Lyle Bennet, portrayed by Randall Bentley, is Claire Bennet's younger brother and the son of Noah and Sandra Bennet. Lyle finds out about his sister's healing powers by watching a videotape showing her quickly recovering from such otherwise deadly experiences as being hit by a car and falling nearly thirty feet. He confirms his realization by stapling Claire's hand and watching it heal, though Claire convinces him to keep the secret and to hand her the tape. After Claire tells her father that Lyle knows about her powers, Mr. Bennet has the Haitian remove Lyle's memories about her healing abilities, but later he becomes aware of her powers again.

=== Sandra Bennet ===
Sandra Bennet, portrayed by Ashley Crow, is Claire Bennet's adoptive mother and the ex-wife of Noah Bennet. She has great affection for her pet pomeranian, Mr. Muggles. She is at first unaware of her husband's activities or her daughter's powers, and the Haitian has wiped her memories several times on her husband's orders. However, after Claire meets Hank and Lisa, Sandra tells Claire that she and Mr. Bennet had tried unsuccessfully to find her biological parents when she was a baby because they thought she might have a rare chromosomal disorder.

=== Martin Gray ===
Martin Gray, portrayed by Ned Schmidtke, is Sylar's adoptive father and biological uncle. He abandoned Sylar and his mother, Virginia, when Sylar was very young. In the third volume, Sylar learns that Martin is not his biological father, prompting him to track Martin down in "A Clear and Present Danger". Martin reveals that his brother, Samson Gray, is his real father, and that he adopted Sylar to appease Virginia and their marital problems. Samson sold Sylar to Martin for an undisclosed amount of money.

=== Virginia Gray ===
Virginia Gray, portrayed by Ellen Greene, is Sylar's mother. When Sylar visits Virginia, she constantly pushes Sylar to "be special", even saying that he could become President if he wanted to. Sylar reveals his powers, accidentally injuring her, and confesses his guilt since he thinks he will be the exploding man and kill many people. Both instances only alienate the two, and Virginia demands that Sylar leave her house and give back her son Gabriel. She brandishes a pair of scissors at Sylar, but is accidentally stabbed in the heart when they struggle for the scissors.

=== Kimiko Nakamura ===
Kimiko Nakamura, portrayed by Saemi Nakamura, is the daughter of Kaito Nakamura and the older sister of Hiro Nakamura. Intelligent and ambitious, she hopes to advance within her father's company, Yamagato Industries. She accompanies Kaito to New York to retrieve Hiro. She gets along with her brother, in comparison to his and their father's strained relationship, as evidenced by the way Kimiko's pleas and reasoning get much further than Kaito's authoritative tactics (up to and including kidnapping). Hiro convinced his father that Yamagato has a successor in Kimiko. In season 4, after Hiro alters an incident from when they were children, Kimiko is now engaged to his best friend Ando, having previously hated Ando because of the incident.

=== Janice Parkman ===
Janice Parkman, portrayed by Lisa Lackey, is the ex-wife of telepathic police officer Matt Parkman. Their marriage has been troubled for some time. Janice blames their problems on his jealousy of her prospering career while his has been stalling, but she had been cheating with his ex-partner. After awakening his powers, Matt then tries to fulfill her every need by reading her thoughts to improve their marriage. Matt discovers that she had had an affair and punches his ex-partner. Two weeks later, after Matt tells Janice of his ability to read minds. When Matt gets a six-month suspension for his rogue actions at work, he reads in her mind that she is pregnant, and he starts working as a bodyguard. Four months later Matt and Janice are divorced, and Matt later reveals to Nathan Petrelli that the child his wife bore is not his, but rather the man's with whom his wife cheated. It is later revealed that the child, named Matt Parkman, Jr, was in fact his. In the episode 'Cold Snap', the infant displayed the ability to control energy (turning on a TV and activating several electronic toys), which also allowed him to jump-start/reactivate an evolved human's ability (by touching Hiro, baby Matt immediately restored Hiro's lost ability to "stop time" and eventually his teleporting and time-travel abilities). Following this revelation, Matt reunites with Janice and they apparently get remarried and are now raising their son together. However, by the time of Heroes: Reborn, their marriage has fallen apart yet again and Matt has gone down a much darker path.

=== Heidi Petrelli ===
Heidi Petrelli, portrayed by Rena Sofer, is Nathan Petrelli's wife and is involved with his strategies for his bid for congressional office. She uses a wheelchair for mobility after being paralyzed in a car crash in the episode "Six Months Ago" caused by Linderman's accomplices under the orders of Arthur Petrelli while Nathan was driving. Nathan, while trying to control the car, suddenly found himself flying for the first time. She is able to walk in the episode "Landslide" after being healed by Mr. Linderman.

=== Simon & Monty Petrelli ===
Simon and Monty Petrelli, portrayed by Justin Evans and Jackson Wurth, are the juvenile sons of Nathan and Heidi Petrelli, seen participating in the Petrelli campaign during the 2006 election. Following the presumed death of their uncle, Peter, Nathan's depression and heavy drinking caused Heidi to leave Nathan, taking their sons with her. As of the second-season episode "Kindred", they live and attend a private school in Washington, D.C.

=== Chandra Suresh ===
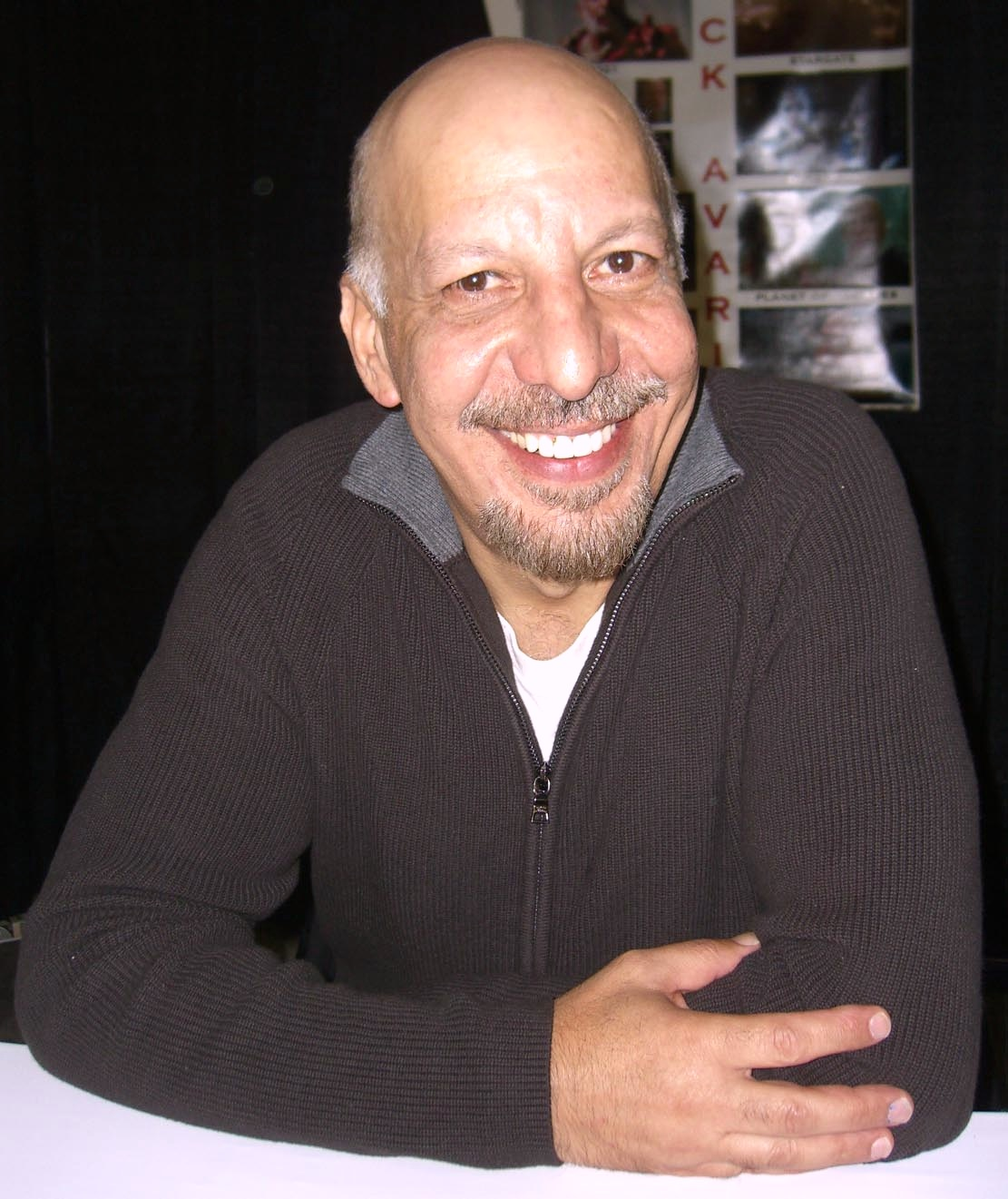
Erick Avari (2009)

Chandra Suresh, portrayed by Erick Avari, was born in Chennai and is Mohinder's late father, as well as the author of Activating Evolution, a book which appears to explain the reason so many people with powers are suddenly appearing. He found a means of tracking and locating potential powered people. He was also connected with Sylar, whom he referred to as "Patient Zero". On a taped telephone conversation from shortly before Chandra's death, however, he said he wanted nothing to do with Sylar, and insisted the man stop calling him. Before his death, Chandra kept a male lizard named Mohinder.

=== Shanti Suresh ===
Shanti Suresh is Chandra Suresh's daughter, also born in Chennai, Tamil Nadu. In the episode "Seven Minutes to Midnight", Mohinder Suresh's mother tells him that she had died at the age of five, two years after he was born. But in the later episode, "The Hard Part", he states that he never got to see her because she died before he was born. His blood actually possessed the antibodies she needed to survive, but he was born just a few months too late. Chandra Suresh said she had a genetic abnormality. Her death, along with several other factors, prompted Chandra Suresh to begin his investigations into people with special powers. She is the original source of the Company's bioweapon, the Shanti virus, that is seen in the first and the second seasons.

=== Damon Dawson ===
Damon Dawson, portrayed by Carlon Jeffery, is Monica's younger brother. When Micah comes to live with the Dawsons, Damon initially bullies him. But when Micah uses his power to tune in pay-per-view television, Damon starts to accept his cousin. He gets Micah's backpack stolen, which eventually leads to Niki Sanders' death.

=== Nana Dawson ===
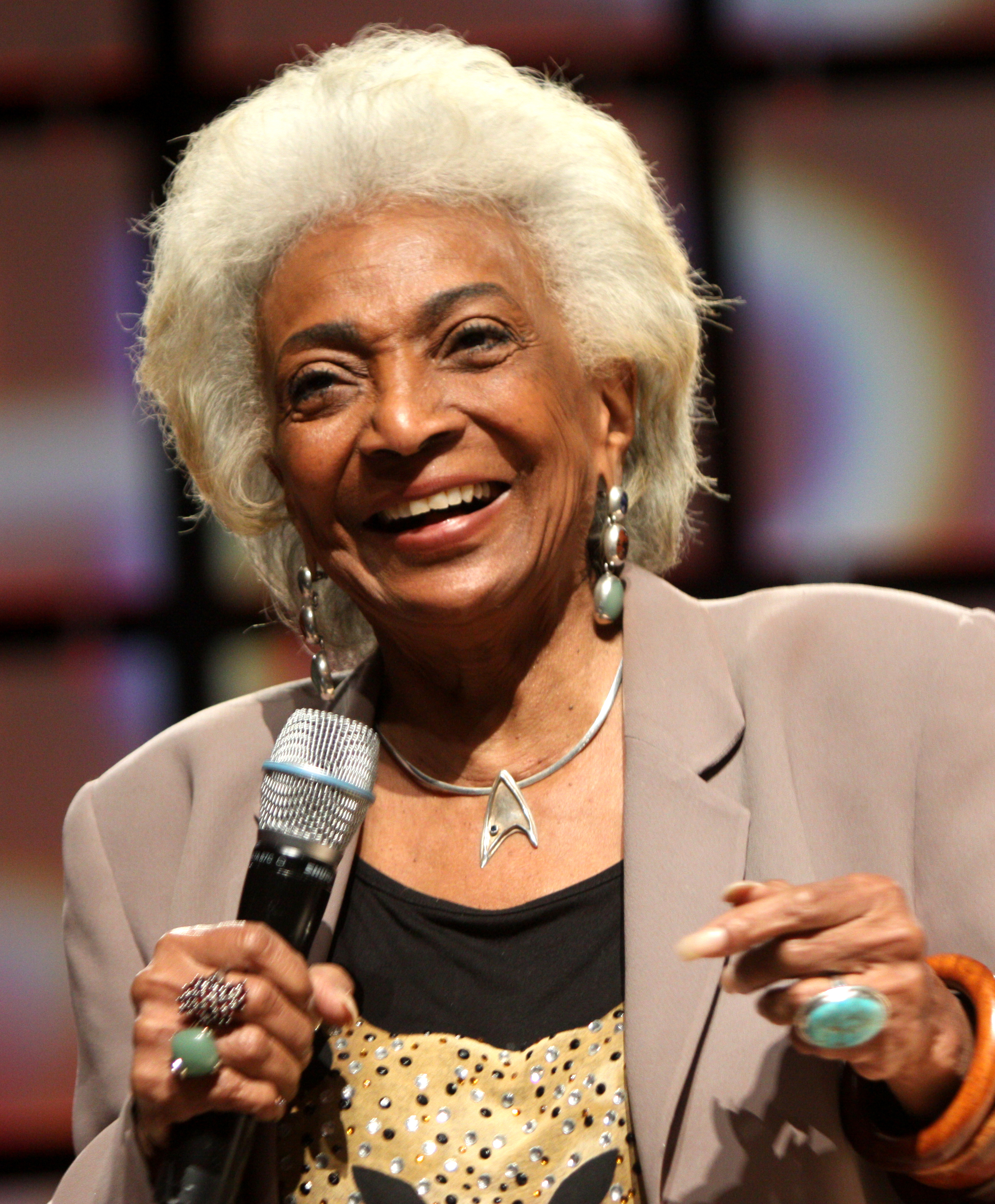
Nichelle Nichols (2013)

"Nana" Dawson, portrayed by Nichelle Nichols, is Micah Sanders' great-aunt and grandmother of Monica and Damon Dawson. She lives with her grandchildren in New Orleans after her daughter, Monica and Damon's mother, is killed during Hurricane Katrina. Niki Sanders leaves Micah in Nana's care when she leaves to join the Company.

== Additional Season One characters ==
This list includes every character not listed above, that appeared in three episodes or more of the first season.

=== Hank and Lisa ===
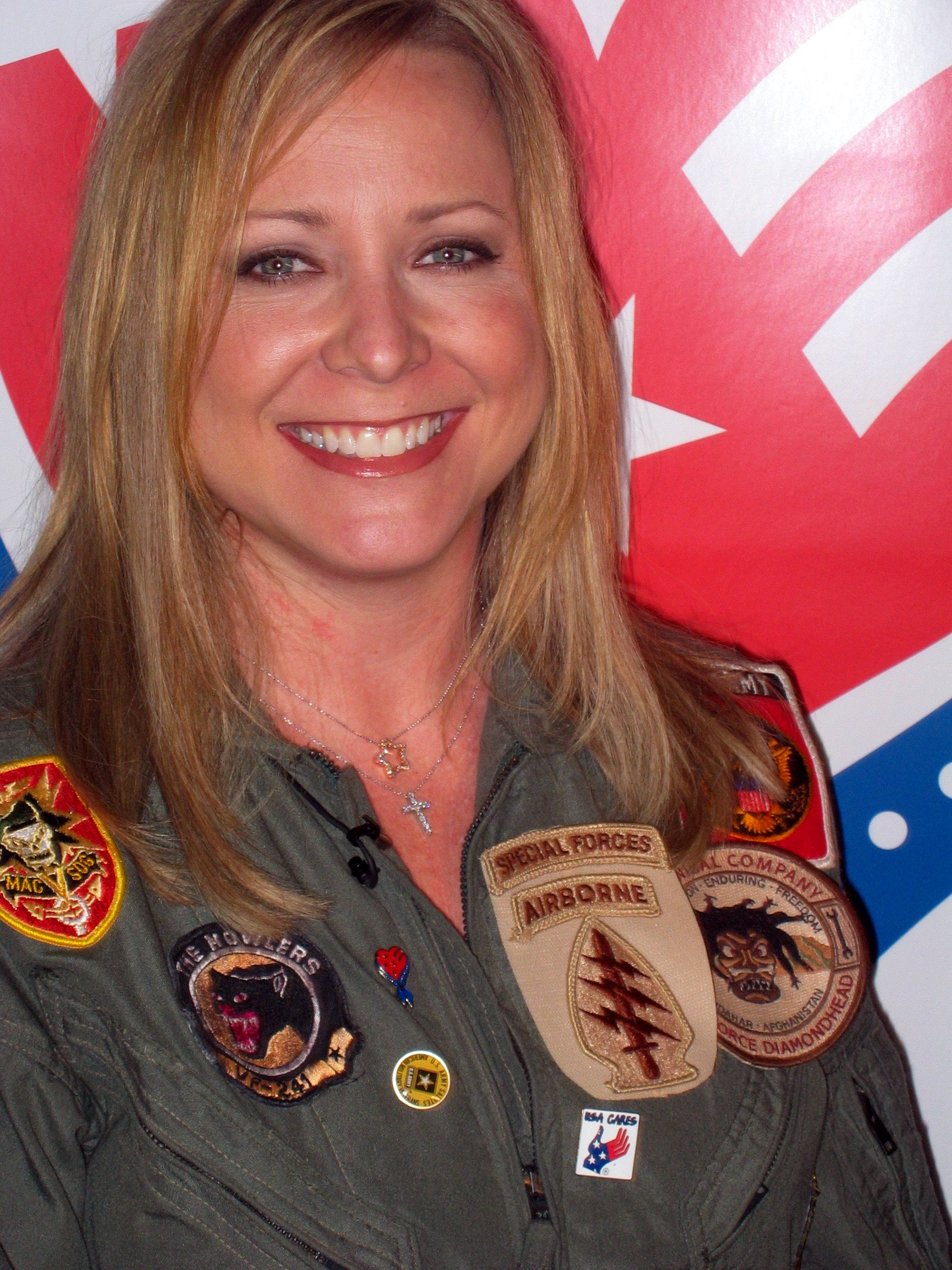
Karri Turner (2006)

Hank and Lisa, portrayed by Colby French and Karri Turner, claim to be a former couple and Claire Bennet's biological parents in "Better Halves". Mr. Bennet tells Claire that he has arranged through an adoption agency for Hank and his former girlfriend, Lisa, to meet Claire and answer her questions. Hank and Lisa tell Claire that they were high school sweethearts who split up before her birth. Hank wanted to keep Claire, while Lisa wanted to give her up for adoption. Hank tells Claire that he has a family history of heart disease and cancer, while Lisa tells her that she has diabetes, but neither tell Claire anything that explains how she got her healing powers.

It is revealed that Hank is actually a doctor working with Mr. Bennet, who later performs tests on Sylar. Hank is killed by Sylar, who then escapes from containment at Primatech.

=== Audrey Hanson ===
Audrey Hanson, portrayed by Clea DuVall, is an FBI agent pursuing Sylar. Three months after Sylar begins his murder spree, Audrey catches sight of him in Chicago, but he eludes her by escaping on a subway after giving his cap and trenchcoat to an elderly man, whom Audrey shoots, mistaking him for Sylar.

While investigating the murder of Molly Walker's family in Los Angeles three months later, Audrey initially gets to know Officer Matt Parkman. He reveals to her his ability to read people's minds and she asks him to help the FBI find Sylar. Later, Sylar unsuccessfully attempts to seize Molly from FBI custody. During his escape, Audrey is almost forced to shoot herself because of the man's telekinetic abilities but is saved when Parkman intervenes.

Audrey again requests the aid of Officer Parkman when she suspects that Sylar has killed again. She takes Parkman to the morgue, where they examine the body of a dead oncologist who was burned alive. Audrey is exposed to a dangerously high amount of radiation while investigating the house of Theodore Sprague, whom she believes to be Sylar. She and Parkman find Sprague in the hospital with his dying wife, but Parkman persuades him to surrender. However, Sprague escapes after being taken into custody by Homeland Security, and she again enlists Parkman's aid in hunting him down. Audrey begins to bond with Matt, to the extent of giving him advice on his relationship with his wife, and she looks to become attracted to him. Two weeks later, Audrey and Matt have the FBI raid Primatech Paper Company. However, they find nothing. Audrey's superior then threatens her position with the bureau. Disheartened, Audrey harshly tells Matt their partnership is over. Audrey re-appears in the penultimate episode for the season and arrests Sprague on a tip from Sylar (posing as Isaac Mendez). After Sprague is killed by Sylar, she is seen at the accident site. When a police officer remarks on how the top of someone's head falls off, she walks by and replies, "You don't want to know".

=== Aron Malsky ===
Aron Malsky, portrayed by Kevin Chamberlin, is a lawyer formerly under the employ of Mr. Linderman. He is first seen visiting D. L. Hawkins to retrieve the case of money stolen by Niki/Jessica. He later visits Niki in the psych ward to notify her of her release, due to someone else supposedly confessing to her crimes. Matt Parkman becomes his personal bodyguard for the day while he's in California. Malsky then uses the two million dollars he retrieved from D. L. to buy diamonds for himself. He is finally murdered by Jessica who was sent by Mr. Linderman.

=== Brody Mitchum ===
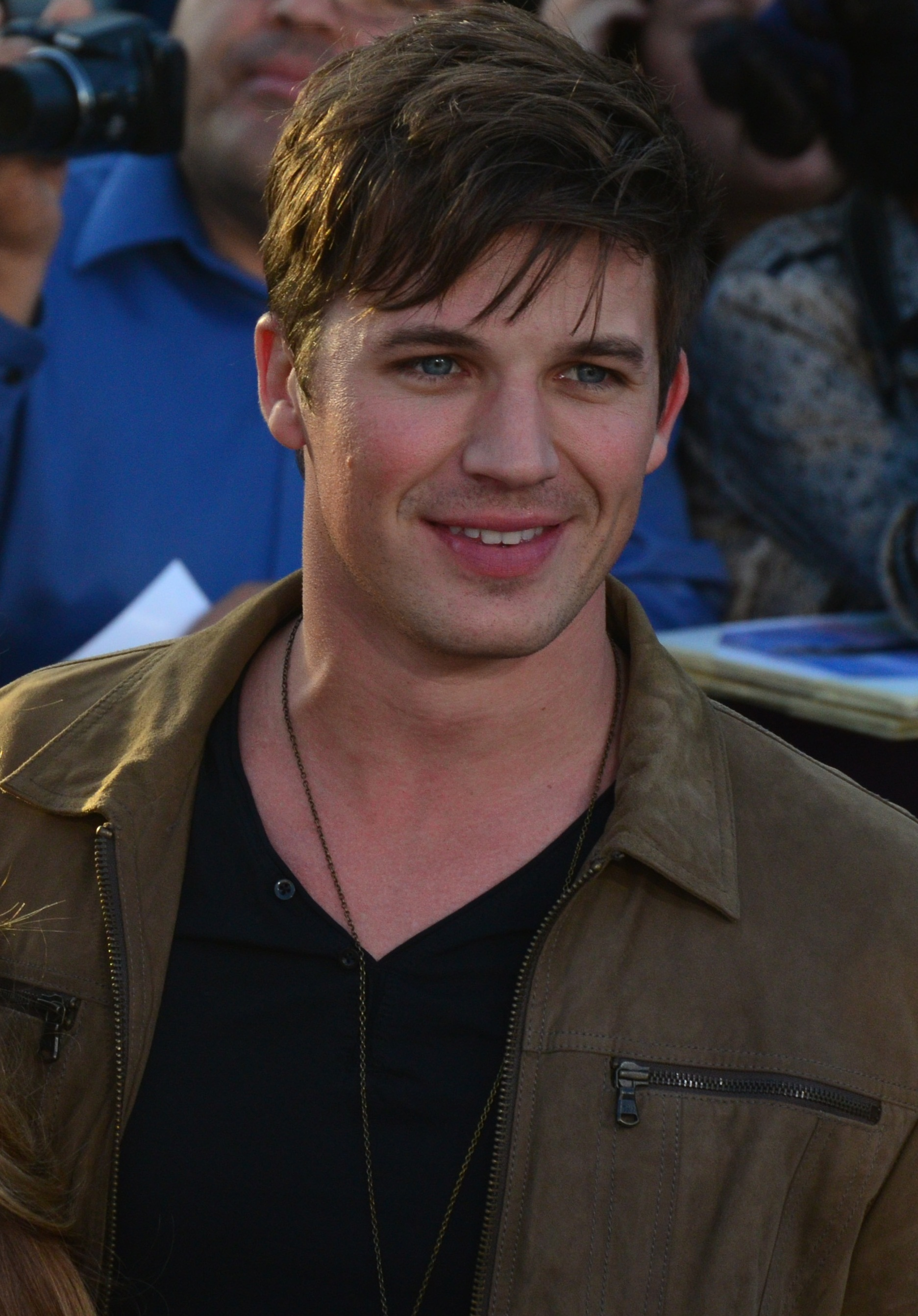
Matt Lanter (2014)

Brody Mitchum, portrayed by Matt Lanter, is a classmate of Claire Bennet and quarterback on the football team at the fictional Union Wells High School. During a celebratory bonfire Brody and Claire wander off to the bleachers, where he attempts to rape her. He accidentally throws her onto a tree branch and considers her dead when a branch impales the back of her head. In "Collision" he is shaken to see her alive again. After Claire discovers that Brody has raped at least one other girl, she convinces him to let her drive them both home in his car, but then, in an attempt to scare him, rams the car headfirst into a brick wall. She drags his unconscious body from the car when it catches fire and ultimately explodes. When he wakes up and sees Claire unharmed, he realizes that she is not a normal human being. After learning of the attempted rape of his daughter, an enraged Mr. Bennet has his associate, the Haitian, wipe out all of Brody's memory. Brody, severely injured, is later seen in a wheelchair attending Homecoming.

=== Mira Shenoy ===
Mira Shenoy, portrayed by Kavi Ladnier, is a geneticist and love interest of Mohinder Suresh, first seen in "Seven Minutes to Midnight", during the funeral of Chandra Suresh in India. Mira offers Mohinder a job in her company so he could return to Madras and forget about his father's research, but he ultimately refuses and returns to New York. In "Brother's Keeper" is shown that Mohinder returned to Madras and lived together with Mira until he was drawn by Project Icarus and left following the compass. In the graphic novel "Second Chances", Mira is abducted by someone interested in Mohinder's research. With the help of Molly, Mohinder finds Mira and saves her, and they end up sharing a kiss.

=== Elisa Thayer ===
Elisa Thayer, portrayed by Stacy Haiduk, is an FBI agent investigating Sylar-related murders who appears in several first-season episodes beginning with "Don't Look Back". The character also appears in the unbroadcast version of the pilot episode.

=== Eric Thompson, Sr. ===
Eric Thompson, Sr. or commonly referred as Agent Thompson or simply Thompson, portrayed by Eric Roberts, is an associate of Noah Bennet at Primatech, which is a cover for his position as Bennet's superior in The Company. The character is first mentioned in "Wireless, Part Two", and introduced in the graphic novel "How Do You Stop an Exploding Man?, Part Two" tracking down Ted Sprague. He is also seen recruiting a young Haitian ("It Takes A Village, Part 4"), and in a failed attempt to recruit Daphne Millbrook ("The Caged Bird"), prior to "Genesis".

In the episode "Company Man", he is mostly seen in flashbacks of Bennet's past dealings with The Company, but he also gets a brief cameo at the end of the episode where he is seen shooting Ted Sprague in the shoulder, causing him to lose control of his radioactive powers, and expressing interest in Claire Bennet's complete recovery from her exposure to Ted's overload. Due to Bennet's betrayal of The Company, Thompson informs him that he is on death row and that he is just waiting for the order to kill him. His later appearances show him recruiting Mohinder Suresh into the Company, and informing Mohinder of Molly Walker's condition. In the Primatech building, he dies when he is shot twice by Noah Bennet while attempting to kill Matt Parkman.

Thompson is portrayed as a man who plays by the rules and takes his orders very seriously. He gets his orders from Linderman. During a conversation with Nathan Petrelli, Thompson reveals that he knows and approves of the plans to blow up New York. When Nathan implies that Linderman does not have the situation under control, Thompson reassures him that Linderman does.

In the Volume Three episode "Villains", a flashback is shown revealing that Thompson had wanted to train Meredith and Flint Gordon Jr. to be agents for the Company. However, Meredith betrays the Company and tries to escape with her brother. After a heated battle on a train, he captures Meredith and asks her why she hates the Company. Meredith replies that the Company killed her daughter, Claire. Upon hearing this, Thompson lets Meredith go, hinting that Claire is still alive.

In the episode "The Wall", seen in flashbacks, Eric approaches Noah in 1987 to recruit him into the Company after seeing what he is capable of. He later informs Noah the will of the Company for him to get married, suggesting the waitress (Sandra).

In the graphic novel From the Files of Primatech: 1988, Thompson is assigned a mission in East Berlin, Germany during the Cold War along with Claude Rains, in which they must catch or terminate a KGB agent named Sylvia with the ability of mass manipulation. Sylvia ultimately turns into a giant defeating both agents, leaving Claude near death; meanwhile Thompson completes the real mission. Once Claude wakes up at the Company, Angela Petrelli reveals the real target; Eric brought a tracking device (isotope pneumatic injection) from Germany which will allow them to track posthumans, starting with Claude.

- His full name is revealed in the graphic novel From the Files of Primatech, Part 5: 1988 as Eric Thompson Sr.
- It is revealed in the graphic novels that he has a son also named Eric Thompson, and referred to as "Thompson Jr.," who also works for The Company. He sees in Noah Bennet the face of treason as he killed his father. He also appears in Faction Zero iStory.

=== Tina ===
"Texas" Tina, portrayed by Deirdre Quinn, is the romance-novel-loving confidante of Niki Sanders who frequently takes care of Niki's son, Micah, and attends Alcoholics Anonymous meetings with Niki. When Niki confides in Tina about having blackouts and possibly an alternate personality, Tina tells her that her troubles stem from psychological damage as a result of her dealings with the mob. In "Nothing to Hide", Tina finally meets and flees from Niki's alternate personality, Jessica, after Micah is taken away by D. L. Hawkins.

=== Jackie Wilcox ===
Jacqueline "Jackie" Wilcox, portrayed by Danielle Savre, is a cheerleader and high school classmate of Claire Bennet. Although she claimed to be "BFF" (best friends forever) with Claire and once revealed plans to run for class president with "good deeds" as her platform, Jackie is an obnoxious rival and dramatic foil for Claire. Jackie repeatedly taunts Zach about his sexual orientation. She is also apparently jealous of Claire and Brody Mitchum, who described Jackie as a gossip. Jackie is eager to be the center of attention and takes credit for a fire rescue Claire performed in "Genesis". Sylar mistakes Jackie for Claire after having read of Jackie's faked heroism and kills her by telekinetically slicing open her skull. Jackie's last word to Claire is "run." She appears again in "Once Upon a Time in Texas", as Hiro travels back in time before Sylar gets to Charlie; Jackie is seen along with Claire and other cheerleaders celebrating the outcome of the homecoming football match. Ultimately, Hiro teleports Sylar to Odessa so he will not harm Charlie, but it is hinted that Jackie and later victims will have the same fate they once had. She appears again in "Pass/Fail" in Hiro's mental trial as the main Sylar's victim Hiro could save besides Charlie.

=== Zach ===
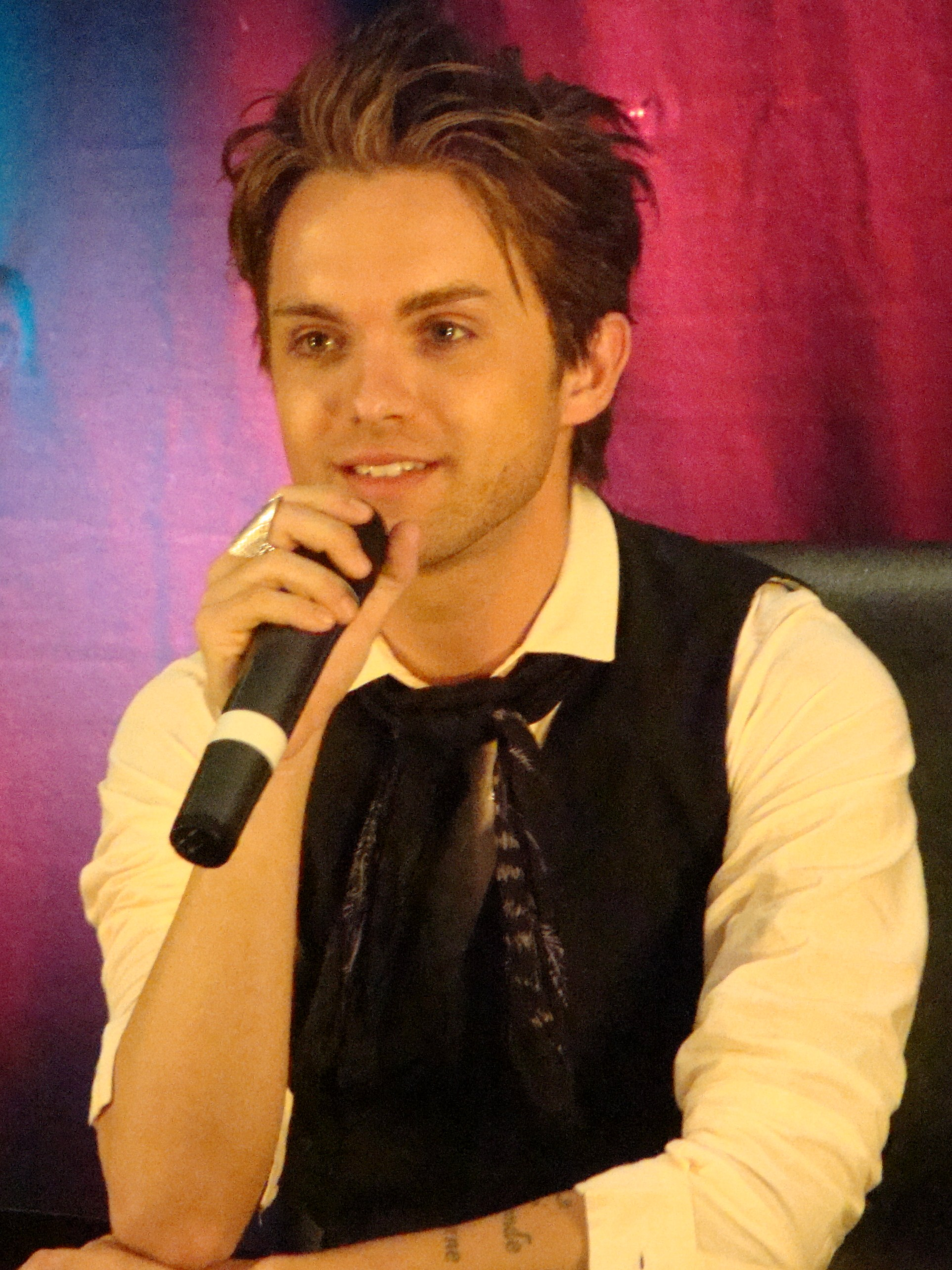
Thomas Dekker (2012)

Zach, portrayed by Thomas Dekker, is a high school classmate of Claire Bennet and one of the first people to know of her powers. He videotapes Claire using her abilities. He tells Claire that he helped her win the Homecoming Queen election by campaigning for her amongst the "unpopular" crowd. He also gives her a book written by Chandra Suresh, which he says details information on her power and others.

Though it was originally intended for Zach to be gay, Dekker's manager "didn't want him to be playing a gay character" for career reasons, and his storyline was later changed.

== Additional Season Two characters ==
=== Caitlin ===
Caitlin, portrayed by Katie Carr, is Ricky's sister and a love interest of Peter Petrelli. Caitlin aids Peter in rediscovering his abilities, but after being transported to the future where the Shanti Virus has devastated the world, Caitlin gets separated from Peter to be deported back to Ireland. Peter tries to teleport back to the present with her, but accidentally leaves her behind. Her ultimate fate is unknown but when Peter destroys the Shanti Virus in the present, the future she was trapped in is erased, most likely erasing her from existence as well.

=== Kyle Dilman ===
Kyle Dilman, played by Brian Kimmet, was Noah Bennet's manager at Copy Kingdom. Dilman returns as the main antagonist of the Webseries: Nowhere Man, where he has been promoted to a corporate position at Copy Kingdom Headquarters.

=== Bryan Fuller ===
Detective Bryan Fuller, portrayed by Barry Shabaka Henley, is Matt Parkman's partner in the NYPD.

=== Debbie Marshall ===
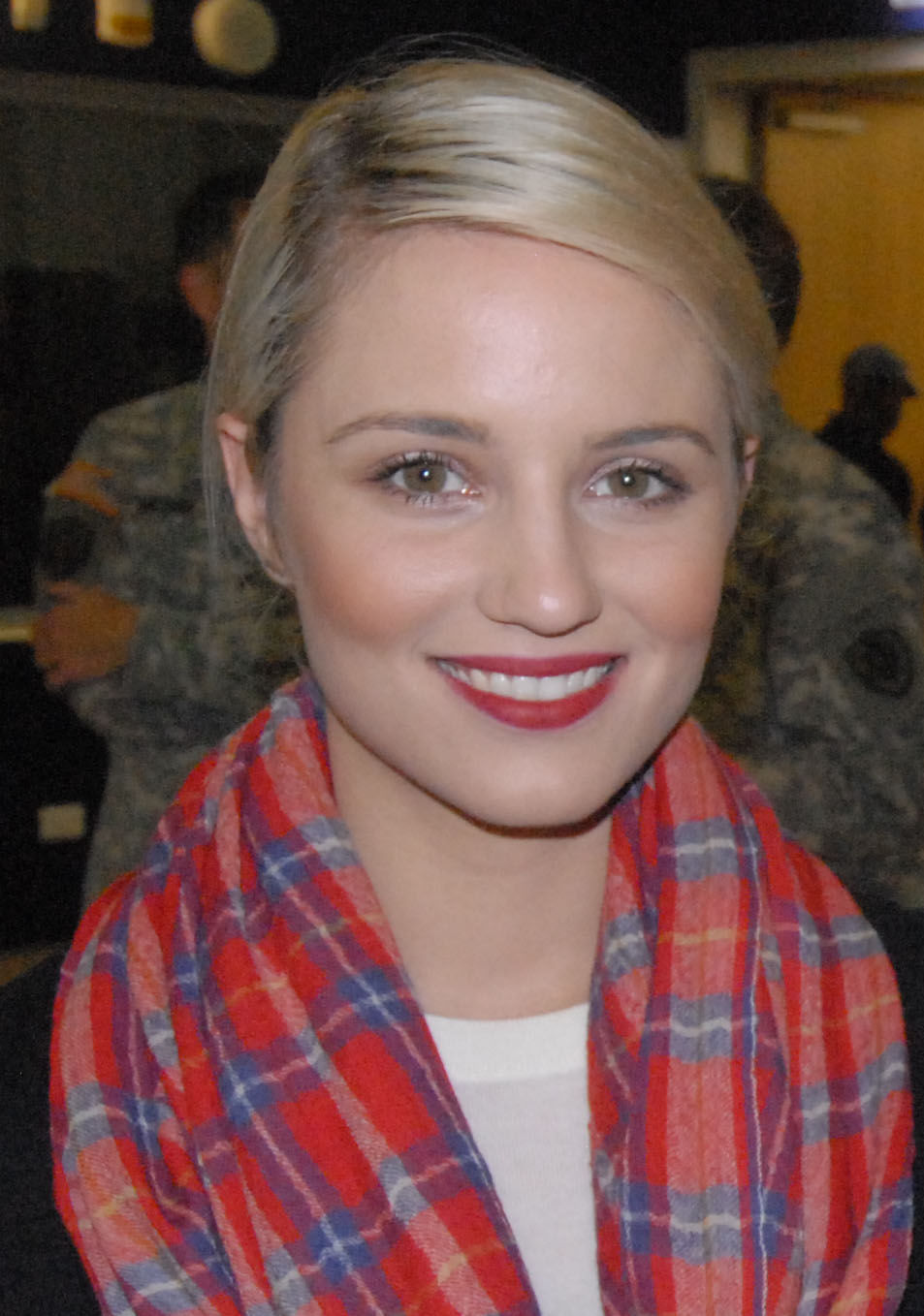
Dianna Agron (2014)

Deborah "Debbie" Marshall, portrayed by Dianna Agron, is the head cheerleader/captain of the cheer squad at Costa Verde High School. The character was described as both a kind of "princess" and "cutthroat", serving as an antagonist to Claire; in "The Line" Claire seeks to get revenge by terrifying Debbie, which Slant Magazine found "too macabre, especially because [Debbie] looks genuinely devastated." Initially, Agron auditioned for the nice cheerleader role, as she had previously been typecast as the "nice girl", but a producer in the casting told her: "No, that's not so interesting. I want you to read this [mean] character."

=== Ricky ===
Ricky, portrayed by Holt McCallany, is an Irish mobster, first appearing in the season premiere while searching for a shipping container with his partners Tuko and Will. After finding Peter, Ricky holds him captive until Peter defends Caitlin from an attack by rival mobsters. Ricky threatens to burn the box of Peter's personal possessions to force Peter to help them with another robbery and refuses to believe Peter when Peter tells him that Will is planning to betray him, having accidentally read the man's mind. Peter turns out to be right, but overpowers Will using his abilities and saves Ricky. In gratitude, Ricky gives Peter back his box and gives him a tattoo, telling him that Peter was now a part of his family. Upon finding Elle Bishop was searching for Peter, Ricky works to protect him, especially after finding out that Peter and Caitlin are now romantically involved. Elle murdered him for his protection of Peter, prompting Peter to stop running and start searching for the truth about his past.

=== The Swordsmith ===
The Swordsmith, portrayed by Cary-Hiroyuki Tagawa is Yaeko's father and the creator of Takezo Kensei's sword. He first appeared in "The Line". He made the guns for Whitebeard's army. He is rescued by his daughter Yaeko and Hiro Nakamura who proceeded to destroy Whitebeard's guns and effectively defeat him.

=== Whitebeard ===
Whitebeard, portrayed by Kurando Mitsutake, was a warlord in 17th century Japan. He first appeared in "Four Months Later...". For most of season 2, Hiro Nakamura, Takezo Kensei and Yaeko plot against him. Whitebeard forces Yaeko's father to build him an arsenal of guns and he has a massive army. After Kensei betrays him, Hiro sets out to defeat Whitebeard by destroying his arsenal of guns. Hiro succeeds and Kensei is apparently killed in the blast though it is later revealed he survived due to his regenerative powers. The destruction of his guns destroyed Whitebeard's camp and scattered his army, defeating him.

=== Will and Tuko ===
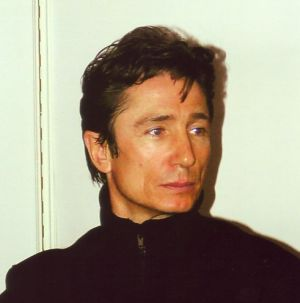
Dominic Keating (2007)

Will and Tuko, portrayed by Dominic Keating and Adetokumboh M'Cormack, are two associates of Ricky's. They reside in Cork, Ireland. They work with Ricky in some of his illegal ventures. Will betrays Ricky but is stopped by Peter. He later tells Elle Bishop what he knows about Peter.

=== Yaeko ===
Yaeko, portrayed by Eriko Tamura, is the swordsmith's daughter in the legend of Takezo Kensei. She lives in Feudal Japan, 1671. She acts as the love interest of both Hiro Nakamura and Takeso Kensei, but Hiro has to leave her behind in the end and return to his own time.

== Additional Season Three characters ==
=== Emile Danko ===
Emile Danko, portrayed by Željko Ivanek, also referred to as "The Hunter", is a senior agent of the Department of Homeland Security who served as the leader of a team of soldiers hunting and imprisoning people with abilities on behalf of his superior, Senator Nathan Petrelli. He is one of the central antagonists during Volume 4: Fugitives. He is later killed by the speedster Edgar.

=== Hesam ===
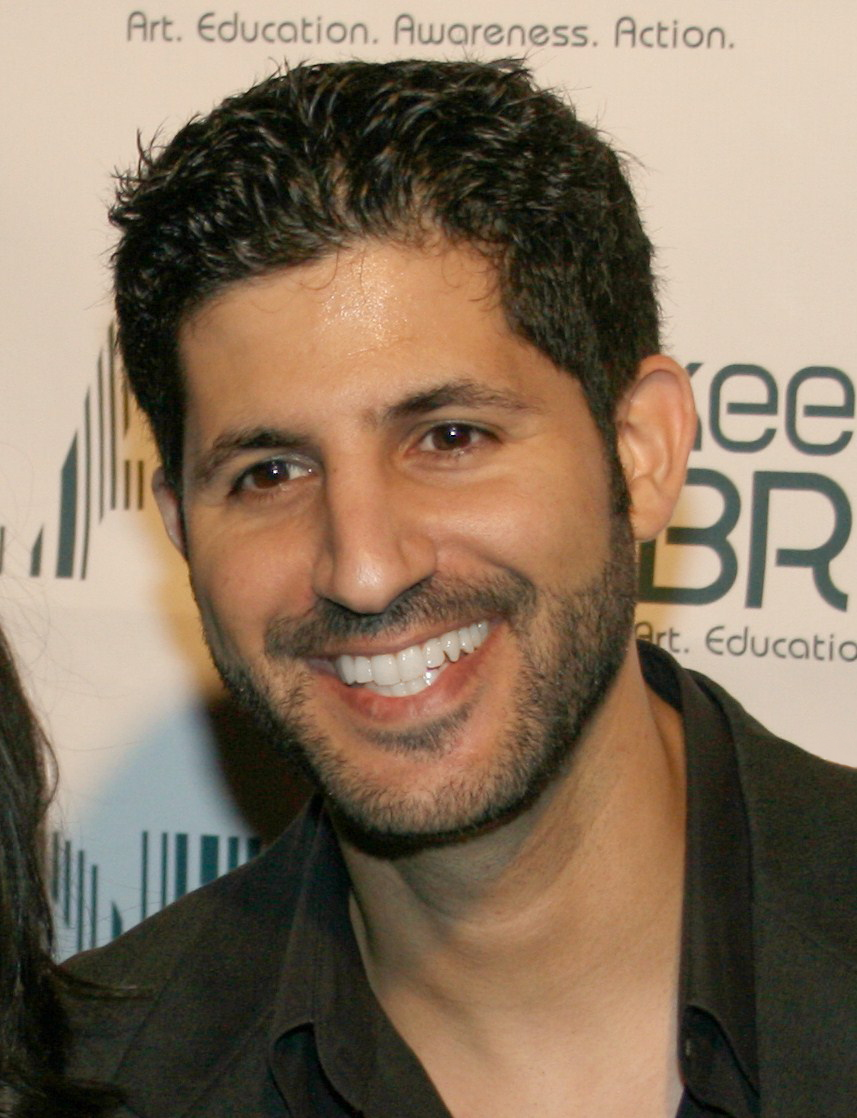
Assaf Cohen (2007)

Hesam, portrayed by Assaf Cohen, is a paramedic in New York City, friend and co-worker of Peter Petrelli, introduced in "A Clear and Present Danger". He is of middle-eastern descent, and so he is at first concerned about Nathan's speech about minorities, not knowing that he was talking about posthumans instead. He acts as Peter's partner in Redemption and is angry about his running off all the time to save people and leaving Hesam behind. He tells Peter he is nothing but Peter's chauffeur, not knowing of Peter's powers.

=== Robert Malden ===
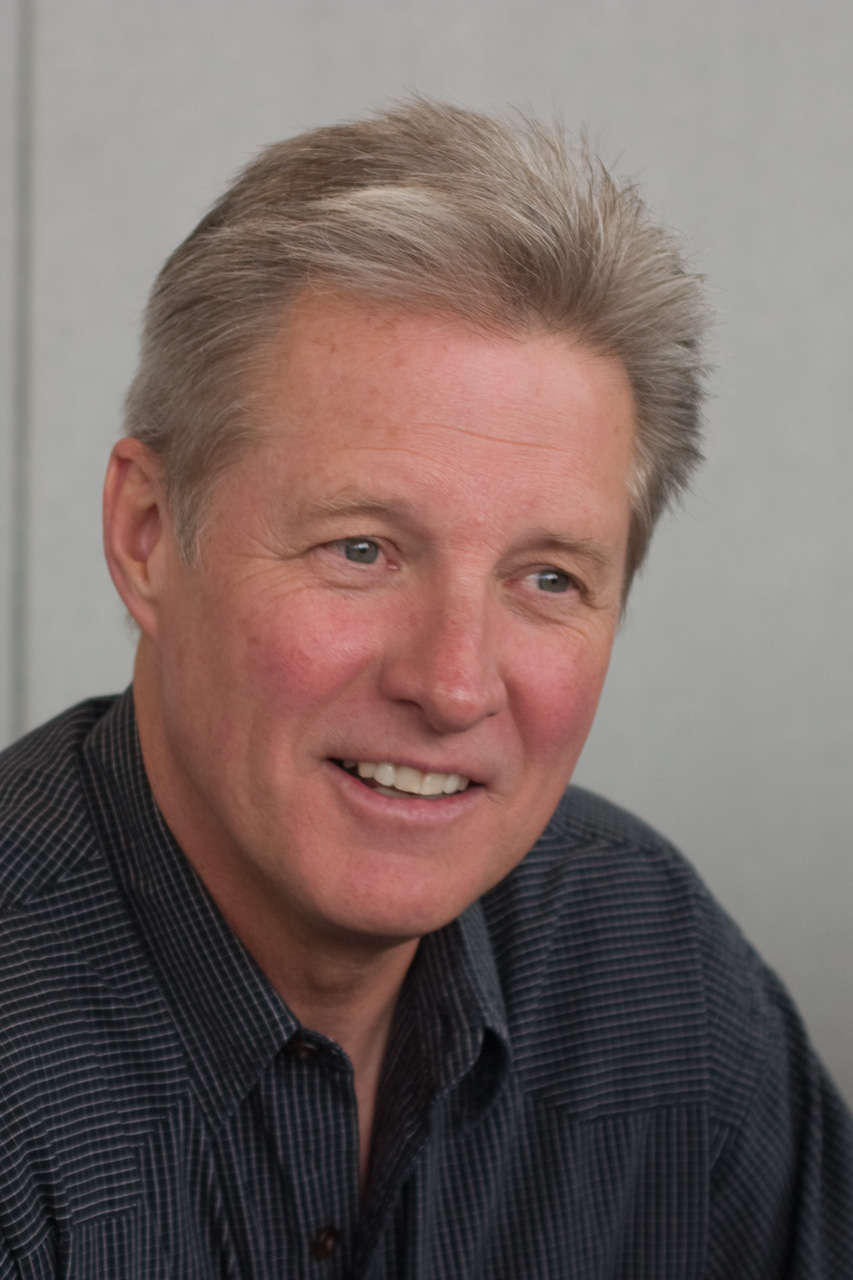
Bruce Boxleitner (2008)

Robert Malden, portrayed by Bruce Boxleitner, is the governor of the state of New York by the time Nathan Petrelli was shot during a press conference in Odessa, Texas. He is introduced in "The Second Coming".

=== Dr. Jonas Zimmerman ===
Dr. Jonas Zimmerman, portrayed by Ronald Guttman, is a former employee of the Company. He helped create the formula that grants synthetic abilities. Under Company orders, he delivered Niki Sanders and Tracy Strauss, as well as their third sister Barbara, and gave them their abilities. After his tenure with the Company was over, however, many of his memories of employment there were erased. It is later revealed in the episode "1961" that he was working with Chandra Suresh at Coyote Sands, conducting research on posthumans for the government, Project Icarus.

== Additional Season Four characters ==
=== Gretchen Berg ===
Gretchen Berg, portrayed by Madeline Zima, is a college student of Arlington University who befriends Claire Bennet in "Orientation". She recognizes Claire as the survivor of the cheerleader massacre in Odessa, Texas ("Homecoming"), and ultimately becomes friends with her, which makes Claire's roommate Annie jealous. She is revealed to be bisexual and she has a crush on Claire. They become roommates though they have some issues after Becky Taylor tries to kill her.

=== Lauren Gilmore ===
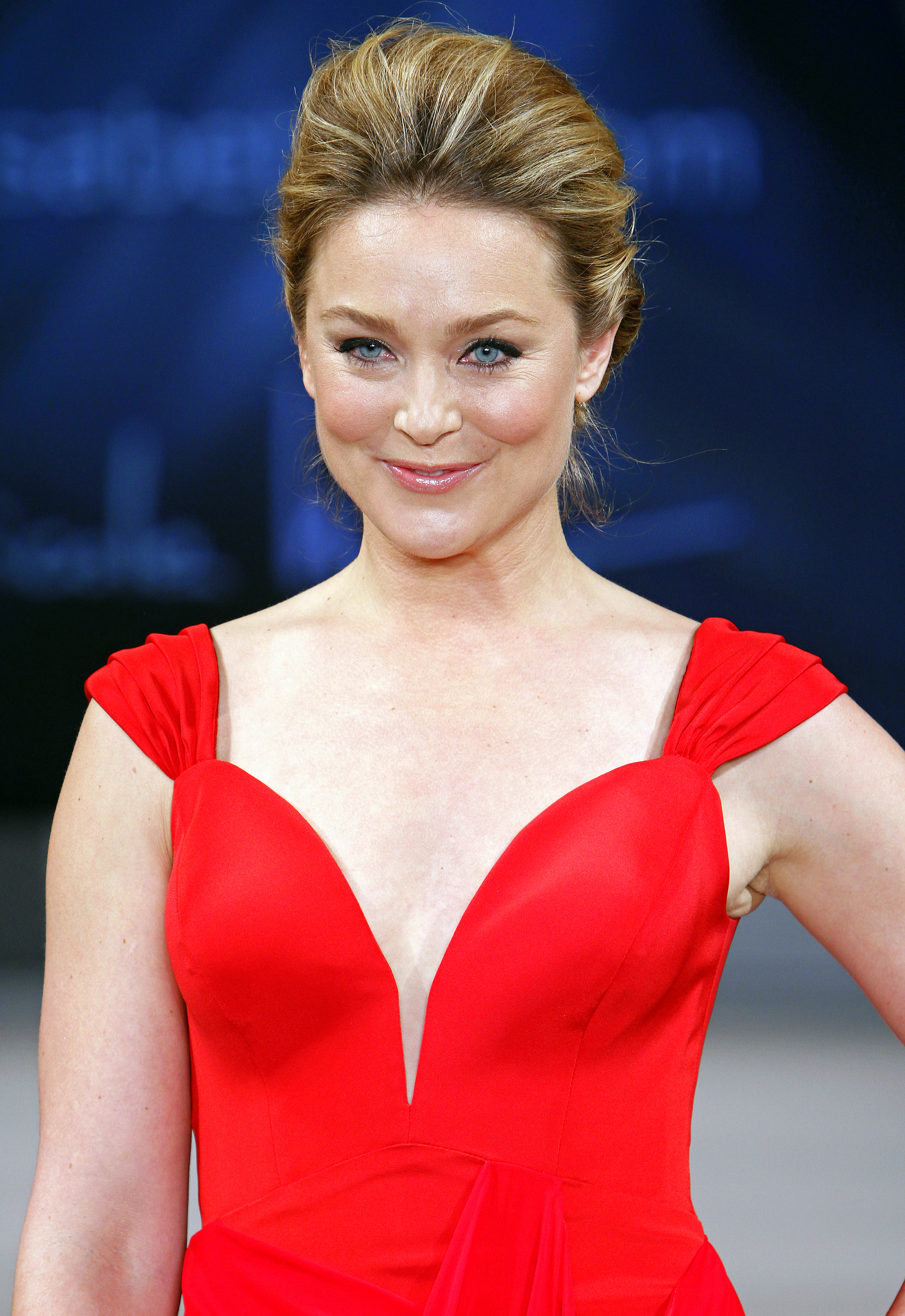
Elisabeth Röhm (2012)

Lauren Gilmore, portrayed by Elisabeth Röhm, is a CIA agent who previously worked as Noah Bennet's closest co-worker. She is introduced in "Once Upon a Time in Texas" working with Noah at Primatech Paper as the events of Volume One "Genesis" unfold, more as a confidant outside of the home when Noah cannot tell his family about what his job really entails.

=== Vanessa Wheeler ===
Vanessa Wheeler, portrayed by Kate Vernon, is a cellist living in Los Angeles and old flame of Samuel Sullivan, who constantly draws her picture using his ability. Although mentioned before, she is first seen in the episode "Close to You", when Noah Bennet and Matt Parkman track her down and telepathically convince her to talk about Samuel.

== Webisode characters ==
Characters with special abilities who only appear in the webisodes.

=== Bartell ===
Bartell, portrayed by Luke Massy, was the leader of Knox's Los Angeles gang and the main antagonist of the Webseries: Hard Knox.

In Part 1, Matt Parkman tries to convince Knox to leave the gang Bartell is running. They part ways, and later the gang are planning a job and selecting guns. When Knox mentions he wants to "sit this one out", Bartell does not comply. Bartell does a "confidence check" on each member (by holding a gun to their throats), except Knox, who begins sensing their fear, which allows the surprised Knox to effectively bend a steel crowbar into a pretzel. When no other gang member asks to skip out on the heist, Knox reluctantly agrees to participate.

In Part 3, Bartell confronts Knox about talking to a cop. Bartell begins punching him, and then threatens him with a gun. He then prepares to beat Knox up with a baseball bat, but Knox, empowered by the fear of the other gang members present, breaks the bat in half. Knox proceeds to throw Bartell around the room, before punching a hole through his chest; killing him. One of the gang members, in shock, tells him that he killed Bartell, with Knox answering that he is "the main man" now.

In Part 4, When Matt asks what happened to Bartell, Knox merely replies that he heard he "got eaten by a shark". This may imply that they threw Bartell's remains in the ocean.

=== The Constrictor ===
The Constrictor, portrayed by Mark Steger, served as the main antagonist of The Webseries: Going Postal, and has the power of constriction. He is sent with Howard to capture Echo DeMille. After their first attempt fails, leaving Howard dying on the ground and bleeding from his ears, the Constrictor finishes Howard off and goes after Echo himself. However, he is killed by Echo after using his ability on Echo's girlfriend in an attempt to force him to surrender.

=== David Sullivan ===
David Sullivan, portrayed by Brian T. Skala, is a Sergeant in the United States Marine Corps recruited by Pinehearst as part of their super soldier program. The goal of the program is to inject the marines with an experimental serum to aid in the apprehension of people with special abilities by granting them abilities themselves. He is shown working at a Pinehearst facility alongside Pvt. Rachel Mills and Ryan Hanover. During the explosive disaster there, he is severely injured by falling debris. In an attempt to save him, Rachel injects him with a vial of the serum. The serum augments his strength and speed, makes his eyes glow red-orange, and also causes him to behave in a violent, animalistic fashion. After attacking and killing Ryan, he also turns on Rachel. However, she stabs him to death with a pair of scissors.

=== Edward ===
Edward, portrayed by Jose Yenque, is the father of Santiago and the husband of Iris, and is a former agent of the Company. He has the abilities of both accelerated probability - allowing him to slow time, determine which action to take, and do so at a superhuman speed - and electricity manipulation. With his family threatened, he was forced to work as an assassin for the Company, but eventually faked his death to leave that life. Upon learning that the Company is going after his family, he returns and attempts to kill the character listed in the credits as Serious Looking Woman (S.L.W.) by electrocution.

=== Elisa ===
Elisa, portrayed by Lina Esco, is a Company agent with the ability to turn her body into water. She is partnered with S.L.W., and the duo is assigned to capture Santiago and convince him to be an agent. However, Elisa develops feelings for him, and releases him so that he will not end up like her.

=== Iris ===
Iris, portrayed by Norma Maldonado, is married to Edward and the mother of Santiago. She has the ability of pyrokinesis.

=== Leona Mills/Linda Niles ===
Leona Mills is the long-lost mother of Rachel Mills. Leona is a childhood friend of Angela Petrelli (affectionately referring to her as "Angie"). Leona is also an evolved human with the ability to absorb life-force from both living and inanimate objects (such as the ground around her); with such a degree of control Leona can age herself to make herself look extremely old or relatively young at will.

=== Serious looking woman ===
A serious looking woman, portrayed by Andrea Thompson, served as the main antagonist of The Webseries: Destiny.

=== Santiago ===
Santiago, portrayed by Roberto Urbina, is a posthuman living in Peru with the ability of accelerated Perception, which allows him to slow down time, analyze which action to take, and then do so at a superhuman speed. He believed for years that his father was dead, but finds out the truth after being captured by S.L.W. and Elisa that his father was an assassin for the Company. He refuses to follow in his father's footsteps, and eventually escapes with Elisa, to whom he is mutually attracted.

== Graphic novel characters ==
This list includes every character not listed above, that has appeared in a graphic novel, and has a superhuman ability.

=== Julien Dumont ===
Julien Dumont was an agent of the company who was able to duplicate himself, supposedly monitoring a bag and tag mission of several of his duplicates who had gone rogue in Antarctica, Australia and the Congo (though a holding room filled with more indicates that there were even more).

=== Donna Dunlap ===
Donna Dunlap was merely an everyday dental receptionist who happened to have telescopic, microscopic, and nocturnal vision.

=== Sabine Hazel ===
Sabine Hazel is a medical professional (specifically a biologist) in the employ of the Company who was selected by Bob Bishop to become an agent and partner of whom she believed was the real (or "Root") Julien Dumont. Initially only together to protect him, eventually, Sabine succumbed to her desires and became his lover. Secretly, Sabine had been contacted by the mysterious Evs Dropper, who claimed Dumont was an imposter. Sabine, however, did not believe the warning.

It is revealed in "Rebellion, Part 5: Wanted", in a conversation between Micah Sanders and Eric Thompson Jr. that her baby has already been born, and is considered to be as dangerous as his posthuman father, Julien Dumont, although is never revealed if he has any ability.

=== Sparrow Redhouse ===
Sparrow Redhouse was on Chandra's list, as well as the Gabriel Gray's list. In 2011, in the possible future in which the destruction of New York City in 2006 is not stopped, Future Hiro rescues Sparrow from police. When he scolds her for not obeying her curfew, Sparrow criticizes the government. The graphic novels reveal that she was the prisoner who was sucked out of Flight 195 in "A Clear and Present Danger", and survived by breaking her fall using her power of terrakinesis.

=== Linda Tavara ===
Linda Tavara, originally seen on Chandra Suresh's list of posthumans, had the ability to see and absorb the auras of other people by touching them.
