= Don't Look Back (Heroes) =

- Heroes episode
- Episode no.: Season 1 Episode 2
- Directed by: Allan Arkush
- Written by: Tim Kring
- Cinematography by: John B. Aronson
- Editing by: Donn Aron
- Original release date: October 2, 2006
- Running time: 43 minutes

Guest appearances
- Clea DuVall as Audrey Hanson; Nora Zehetner as Eden McCain; Cristine Rose as Angela Petrelli; Stacy Haiduk as Elisa Thayer; James Kyson as Ando Masahashi; Richard Steinmetz as Detective; Matt Lanter as Brody Mitchum; Danielle Savre as Jackie Wilcox; Thomas Dekker as Zach; Deirdre Quinn as Tina; Jack Coleman as Noah Bennet

Episode chronology
← Previous "Genesis"	Next → "One Giant Leap"
- Heroes season 1

"Don't Look Back" is the second episode of the first season of the American superhero drama television series Heroes. The episode was written by series creator Tim Kring, and directed by executive producer Allan Arkush. It originally aired on NBC on October 2, 2006.

The series tells the stories of ordinary people who discover that they have superhuman abilities and how these abilities take effect in the characters' lives as they work together to prevent catastrophic futures. In the episode, Hiro experiences a vision, while Peter questions Nathan over his powers. Meanwhile, a police officer Matt Parkman begins to hear voices in his head.

According to Nielsen Media Research, the episode was seen by an estimated 12.96 million household viewers and gained a 4.6 ratings share among adults aged 18–49. The episode received positive reviews from critics, who praised the performances and climax, although some criticized the pacing.

== Plot ==
Peter wakes up in the hospital after the previous episode, where his brother Nathan denies that they flew. Their mother reveals that their father was suffering from depression, and assumes that Peter is suffering from delusions that make him feel invincible, but will inevitably lead to his downfall. Peter becomes depressed, feeling that no one will believe him, and later stands at the top of a New York City building, prepared to jump. Nathan finds him in time, though Peter orders his brother to tell the truth, and admit he actually did fly. As he's saying this, it's revealed he is hovering in the air.

Claire's friend Jackie takes credit for saving the man from the fire in the previous episode, and Zach reveals that he cannot find the videos of Claire regenerating. Later on, Mr. Bennet is convinced that Claire has matured enough, and tells her he is trying to arrange a meeting with her biological parents. Unbeknownst to Claire, her father is in possession of the missing videos.

At his father's apartment in New York, Mohinder meets Eden McCain, a friend of Chandra's who believed in his theories. A man named Sylar attempts to contact Chandra, revealing that his "hunger" is out of control. Mohinder and Eden find a flash drive that contains a computer program formerly used by Chandra in his research. Elsewhere, at a murder scene, police officer Matt Parkman begins hearing a young girl's voice in his head. Following it, he finds the victims' daughter hidden. He overhears the investigators mention a suspect named Sylar. FBI agent Audrey Hanson questions Matt's knowledge of the girl's location, and arrests him on suspicion of being involved in the murder.

Having arrived in Times Square, Hiro sees himself on the cover of a comic book, which he purchases. He attempts to find the comic book's creator, Isaac. Upon arriving at Isaac's apartment, he finds Isaac's body, and the police arrive and detain Hiro. Discovering that he has accidentally traveled to the future, he manages to travel back as a large, apparently nuclear explosion occurs, decimating the city. In the present, however, Isaac tells Simone that they are responsible for stopping the eventual explosion that he painted, but Simone denies his precognition, and forces him to choose between her or the heroin.

While going to pick Micah up, Niki decides to watch the recording of the killings. She pauses at a stop light to view the film, but finds it blurry and fuzzy. The second the video ends, Niki finds herself elsewhere - at a parking lot, wearing a different outfit, four hours later. Niki has no memory of what happened during the last four hours. Niki later returns to her garage and finds a map inside, that leads her to a new car - inside the car are the bodies of the dead thugs. The map later leads Niki to the middle of the desert, where she finds a shovel waiting for her. Niki begins digging.

== Production ==
=== Development ===
In September 2006, NBC announced that the second episode of the season would be titled "Don't Look Back". The episode was written by series creator Tim Kring, and directed by executive producer Allan Arkush. This was Kring's second writing credit, and Arkush's first directing credit.

== Reception ==
=== Viewers ===
In its original American broadcast, "Don't Look Back" was seen by an estimated 12.96 million household viewers with a 4.6 in the 18–49 demographics. This means that 4.6 percent of all households with televisions watched the episode. It finished 26th out of 91 programs airing from October 2–8, 2007. This was a 9% decrease in viewership from the previous episode, which was watched by an estimated 14.10 million household viewers.

=== Critical reviews ===
"Don't Look Back" received positive reviews from critics. Robert Canning of IGN gave the episode a "good" 7.5 out of 10 and wrote, "The fact that this episode was originally intended to be the second half of a two-hour premiere becomes all too obvious. Instead of a fresh episode moving the characters in new directions, we're given a continuation of the pilot with the major storylines being expanded upon just ever so slightly."

Alan Sepinwall wrote, "So many questions, so few answers in episode two of our superheroic journey. We realize that Hiro traveled through space and time for his jaunt to New York and got to witness both the apocalypse and the results of the election. Are they related? Will Hiro's return to the present prevent both things from happening? We're two episodes in, and I still have zero idea what Niki the stripper's powers are." Angel Cohn of TV Guide wrote, "I have to admit that I was a smidge worried that Heroes pulled out all the stops for the pilot and that the second episode would just pale in comparison. I'm so happy to see that I was wrong about that. I did think that the pacing was a bit off because they showed snippets from last week's adventures the first time they showed each character, but I'm thinking that was just for this episode and future ones won't have that issue. But other than that small quibble, I loved it."

Michael Canfield of TV Squad wrote, "Tonight's episode adds to the puzzle and that's just fine by me. It's still early and, as packed with characters and plot threads as the opener was, this episode seems like the second half of a two hour premiere. We're just getting started, still meeting new characters for the first time, and only Flying Boy has yet to cross paths with any of the other heroes." Television Without Pity gave the episode a "B" grade.
