= Orientation (Heroes) =

- Heroes episodes
- While trapped in Matt's head, Sylar taunts him.
- Episode nos.: Season 4 Episodes 1/2
- Directed by: David Straiton (part one); Ed Bianchi (part two)
- Written by: Tim Kring (part one); Adam Armus and; Kay Foster (part two)
- Production code: 401 / 402
- Original air date: September 21, 2009

Guest appearances
- Robert Knepper as Samuel Sullivan; Ashley Crow as Sandra Bennet; Madeline Zima as Gretchen Berg; Jimmy Jean-Louis as the Haitian; Lisa Lackey as Janice Parkman; Ray Park as Edgar; Dawn Olivieri as Lydia; Rachel Melvin as Annie; Rick Worthy as Mike; Assaf Cohen as Hesam; Wes Ramsey as Roy; Gregory Zola as Roy; Saemi Nakamura as Kimiko Nakamura; Mercedes Colon as Detective Abrams; Željko Ivanek as Emile Danko; Jack Wallace as Arnold; Mikey Kawata as Young Hiro Nakamura; Jordan Dang as Young Ando Masahashi; Satomi Okuno as Young Kimiko Nakamura; Scott Lowell as Prof. Fenton

Episode chronology
← Previous "An Invisible Thread"	Next → "Ink"
- Heroes season 4

"Orientation" is the first episode of the fourth season of the NBC superhero drama series Heroes and the 60th episode overall. The episode aired in the US on September 21, 2009. Produced and filmed as two separate episodes, the episode's title for the second hour was initially announced as "Jump, Push, Fall"; however, it aired as a single double-length episode.

== Plot ==
Samuel Sullivan presides over his brother Joseph's funeral with the Sullivan Bros. Carnival members in attendance. Talking of redemption, he mentions other people like them, accompanied on-screen by clips of the Heroes cast, predicting they will soon join their "family" at the carnival. He finishes by dropping a compass into the grave and telling Joseph to find his way home. He then uses his terrakinetic abilities to close the grave. Later, Samuel uses his powers in conjunction with carnival member Lydia to reveal an image of Emile Danko as a tattoo on her back. Edgar, another carnival member, is sent to retrieve something from Danko. Edgar initially refuses, but is threatened using Samuel's power and relents. Samuel then uncovers a picture of Hiro Nakamura, who visited the carnival fourteen years previously. Using the powers of ailing carnival member Arnold, Samuel travels back in time to meet Hiro.

Upon starting college, Claire Bennet meets her overbearing roommate Annie, and is remembered by a girl called Gretchen as part of the events of the episode "Homecoming". Soon after arriving, Annie is suddenly found dead by Claire. Gretchen agrees that Annie's death was a murder and that they should investigate, suggesting using a dummy to see if she jumped, was pushed or fell. Claire tests this theory herself, healing with her ability, and Gretchen sees what she can do.

Noah Bennet, despite Angela Petrelli's encouragement, is reluctant to restart the Company and return to his old life. In his car, he is attacked by Tracy Strauss' abilities, but is saved by his Building 26 accomplice Danko. Danko explains that he needs Noah's help to stop Strauss. Noah refuses, and Tracy later appears to him in a bar. Noah promises he can give her her life back, but she is skeptical. Noah later uses the Haitian to remove Danko's memories of Tracy. When Danko goes back home, Tracy is waiting for him but he can't remember her. Seeing that Noah has kept his promise she lets Danko live, but before she can leave, Edgar has arrived and uses his super-speed to kill Danko. Tracy calls Noah, who realizes that the cuts are on the stomach and reaches in to remove a key. He goes to visit Peter Petrelli, who has returned to his life as a paramedic, and asks him to help find where the key leads. Following the trail to a safe deposit box, they find a broken compass. Edgar attacks, but upon realizing Peter has mimicked his power he flees. Noah shows Peter the compass, which starts working in Peter's hand. Peter, however, refuses to keep the mysterious item, only interested in saving the lives of others. Edgar later attacks Noah and reclaims the compass. Recovering in hospital, Noah is encouraged by Tracy to help those with abilities.

Meanwhile, Angela is troubled by her son Nathan Petrelli's self-doubt, knowing that he is really Sylar. She contacts Matt Parkman to help, but he refuses to use his ability again. Nathan begins to demonstrate some of Sylar's powers, and attempts to contact Peter about his situation. Sylar's consciousness later manifests inside Matt's mind, attempting to drive him mad and force him to undo his actions. Under Sylar's constant encouragement, Matt eventually uses his power again.

In Tokyo, Hiro and Ando Masahashi have started a "Dial-a-hero" business. However, following their first mission Hiro remains frozen in time. He later wakes up, but confesses to Ando that he is dying. Ando suggests that he travels fourteen years back in time to a carnival, where he was first inspired to be a hero. Hiro refuses to change time, but losing control of his powers he is transported back anyway. Unable to return, he meets past versions of himself, Ando and his sister Kimiko. Samuel approaches him and reveals that he has a power too. Samuel encourages Hiro to change the past, allowing Ando and Kimiko to start a relationship. Returning to the present and seeing the change that has occurred, Hiro resolves to spend his remaining days righting the wrongs he has made. Samuel also returns to the present day and predicts Hiro will come to the carnival soon. Using the same method as before, he reveals pictures of Sylar, Claire and Peter.

== Critical reception ==
Steve Heisler of The A.V. Club rated this episode a C.

Robert Canning of IGN gave the episode 6.8 out of 10.
