= Once Upon a Time in Texas =

- Heroes episode
- Episode no.: Season 4 Episode 8
- Directed by: Nate Goodman
- Written by: Aron Eli Coleite and; Aury Wallington
- Production code: 408
- Original air date: November 2, 2009

Guest appearances
- Elisabeth Röhm as Lauren Gilmore; Jayma Mays as Charlie Andrews; Dawn Olivieri as Lydia; Danielle Savre as Jackie Wilcox; Santiago Cabrera as Isaac Mendez; Sally Champlin as Lynette

Episode chronology
← Previous "Strange Attractors"	Next → "Shadowboxing"
- Heroes season 4

"Once Upon a Time in Texas" is the eighth episode of the fourth season of the NBC superhero drama series Heroes and sixty-sixth episode overall. The episode aired on November 2, 2009.

== Plot ==
Hiro Nakamura arrives three years in the past to save the love of his life, Charlie Andrews. Shortly after arriving, Hiro encounters Sylar, who proceeds into the diner. Charlie pours coffee for her would-be assassin, who startles her after Sylar reveals he knows about her aneurysm. Hiro watches from afar, wondering how he can stop Sylar. Meanwhile, in the present, Samuel Sullivan is worried for his dying friend Arnold, who has the ability to manipulate space-time like Hiro, and intends to have Hiro replace him. When Samuel wonders where he could be, Lydia reveals that Hiro had loved Charlie before she died, correctly deducing Hiro must have gone back in time to save her. Samuel asks Arnold one last time to be sent back, and appears by Hiro. Samuel warns Hiro of the implications to history he could cause by saving Charlie. Hiro asserts Charlie is that important to him, and promises to keep everything else in balance.

Noah Bennet is also at the diner, oblivious to what is about to happen, meeting with his partner, Lauren. The two seem to have been together for sometime, with Lauren taking the initiative and offering a key to her motel room. Noah is reluctant, but takes the key, as he is more worried about his daughter Claire Bennet's fate in the upcoming homecoming game. After meeting with Isaac Mendez to see his paintings (the same scene from "Seven Minutes to Midnight"), Lauren comforts Noah, briefly kissing him, before they awkwardly leave. Later, Noah meets with Claire, where they share a nice moment together before she leaves to go cheer with the other cheerleaders. Noah sees Lauren at her motel room, but explains he can't do this, saying he truly loves his family. Lauren understands, but Noah also explains he needs Lauren's help to deal with Sylar and Claire. Later, Noah receives a note from Lauren explaining she had her memory of their meetings wiped by the Haitian.

Hiro successfully stops Sylar from killing Charlie by stopping time, and moves his body into the cargo space of a bus. However, after returning to the diner, Hiro realizes by having Charlie not die, he will never go back in time to save her in the first place, thus never falling in love with her. Hiro meets with his past self, convincing him that Charlie is dead and that he must go back in time to save her to preserve the space–time continuum. He also orders Ando Masahashi to wait in the diner for his eventual return. Finally, Hiro meets with Charlie, and convinces her to come away with him. As they are about to leave, Charlie begins rambling off random facts, and Hiro realizes she must be dying from her aneurysm. Realizing Sylar could save her, Hiro rushes off to find him, though Sylar traps him with his telekinetic powers and demands to know who he is. Hiro thwarts Sylar's attempts to kill him by stopping time, and offers to tell him about his future in exchange for helping Charlie. Sylar grudgingly agrees, and successfully fixes the blood clot in Charlie's brain. Hiro explains to Sylar that he will gather many abilities, and that he will die alone after being stopped by Hiro and others like him. Hiro says he wishes to help him, but says Sylar must continue on his path, teleporting him out of the diner and into an alleyway. Sylar overhears the cheerleaders' chanting, foreshadowing his attempt to kill Claire. Later, Charlie chastises Hiro for saving her, saying he had done it for selfish reasons, and for not stopping Sylar. Hiro talks briefly with Noah in the diner, but is then surprised by Charlie's return. She thanks him for saving her life, and the two make up with a kiss. She leaves the diner with Hiro following, but when Hiro exits, he finds Charlie gone and Samuel standing outside. Samuel reveals he has taken Charlie, suggesting she is back at his carnival in the present time. Hiro angrily demands to know where she is and Samuel tells him he must retake control of his power and bring them back to the present if he ever wants to see her again. Grabbing Samuel, Hiro manages to teleport them to the Carnival in the present. Samuel shows him Arnold, who has finally died, after his last act of trapping Charlie somewhere in time. Samuel explains he is keeping Charlie as a way to get Hiro to do what he wants; Hiro asks what he must do, to which Samuel says he must correct the wrongs in his life, starting with one event eight weeks ago. In a flashback to that time, Samuel is shown apologizing over the motionless body of Mohinder Suresh.

== Cultural references ==
Hiro uses the catchphrases of two other time-travellers: "Oh boy!" (Dr. Sam Beckett in Quantum Leap), and "Great Scott!" (Dr. Emmett Brown in Back to the Future). He also compares his relationship to Charlie with Crono and Marle from the video game Chrono Trigger.

== Reception ==
"Once Upon a Time in Texas" was watched by 6.2 million viewers, the best figures for Season Four. This was attributed in part to the return to the series of Jayma Mays, now best known for her role as Emma Pillsbury on the Fox show Glee.

Critics gave the episode mixed reviews, with many comparing the state of the series now rather unfavourably to how it was regarded in 2006, where this episode is set. Entertainment Weekly called it the "least bad episode of the season so far", welcoming the chance to see Sylar once again as the "grinning malevolent villain" of Season One, but criticising the Noah Bennett office romance subplot as unnecessary. The HD Room praised the writing of Samuel - "one of the show's more interesting characters" - and called it a "solid episode" that "should please fans of the show." IGN called it "a decently told tale... of course, a little more action would have been nice." The ending of the episode, which featured the first glimpse of Mohinder Suresh this season, attracted much comment, with more than one reviewer quipping that Samuel should not necessarily regard killing Mohinder as a mistake. EW said that a plot revolving around saving Mohinder's life would be "officially the worst idea Heroes has ever had."

Despite the mixed reception, the episode was tied with "Tabula Rasa" in first place on TV.com, both episodes sharing an 8.8 over 10.

Emily VanDerWerff of The A.V. Club rated this episode a C−.
