= One Giant Leap (Heroes) =

- Heroes episode
- Episode no.: Season 1 Episode 3
- Directed by: Greg Beeman
- Written by: Jeph Loeb
- Cinematography by: John B. Aronson
- Editing by: Donn Aron
- Original release date: October 9, 2006
- Running time: 43 minutes

Guest appearances
- Adair Tishler as Molly Walker; Nora Zehetner as Eden McCain; Clea DuVall as Audrey Hanson; Jack Coleman as Noah Bennet; Danielle Savre as Jackie Wilcox; Jimmy Jean-Louis as The Haitian; James Kyson as Ando Masahashi; Matt Lanter as Brody Mitchum; Thomas Dekker as Zach; Lisa Lackey as Janice Parkman; Cristine Rose as Angela Petrelli

Episode chronology
← Previous "Don't Look Back"	Next → "Collision"
- Heroes season 1

"One Giant Leap" is the third episode of the first season of the American superhero drama television series Heroes. The episode was written by co-executive producer Jeph Loeb, and directed by co-executive producer Greg Beeman. It originally aired on NBC on October 9, 2006.

The series tells the stories of ordinary people who discover that they have superhuman abilities and how these abilities take effect in the characters' lives as they work together to prevent catastrophic futures. In the episode, Hiro tries to convince Ando in getting to America to prevent his vision from becoming a reality. Meanwhile, Claire attends a party, while Mohinder finds a connection to his father.

According to Nielsen Media Research, the episode was seen by an estimated 13.34 million household viewers and gained a 4.7 ratings share among adults aged 18–49. The episode received mostly positive reviews from critics, who praised the tone, intrigue and ending.

== Plot ==
Niki finishes burying the dead thugs. Afterward, she confronts her mother-in-law, who believes she cannot take care of Micah. Niki reveals that her estranged husband D.L. has escaped from prison. Later, Niki and Micah are taken willingly by one of Mr. Linderman's henchmen.

After her high school's football team's victory, Claire attends a celebratory bonfire. Brody Mitchum, the team's quarterback, talks to Claire and takes her away from the group, then attempts to rape her. After a brief struggle, Claire's head is impaled on a branch and Brody conceals her body. At the end of the episode, an autopsy is being performed on Claire, and the branch is removed, causing her to revive.

Hiro returns to the present, where he shows Ando a comic book he obtained during his visit to future New York that depicts their exact words and actions. Hiro convinces Ando to follow him to America, where they will be responsible for saving the world from the catastrophe witnessed by Hiro in the future.

Peter is still angry at Nathan for denying their situation; Nathan is more concerned about Peter's appearance to the press and its potential effects on his campaign. At a campaign event that evening, Nathan claims to his guests that Peter was depressed, and attempted to commit suicide. Peter leaves, angered, but is found by Simone, who he had confessed his love to earlier, and they kiss.

Mohinder and Eden find an address that appears to be Sylar's apartment. There, they find that Sylar has much information on where to find the superpowered characters, as well as confessional messages from Sylar. Later, they return to find everything missing.

Matt convinces Audrey that he is innocent and that he can read minds. Audrey offers him a job with the FBI. Sylar finds Molly and attempts to attack her, but is pursued by Matt and Audrey. Despite sustaining several apparent gun wounds, he gets up and escapes. At home, Matt and his wife argue, and Matt leaves. At a bar, he sees a mysterious man ("the Haitian") whose mind he can't read, and Matt falls unconscious.

Isaac forces Simone to leave when she states that she does not believe in his precognition. Later, Isaac notices one of his drawings, depicting two people kissing in the rain — Simone and Peter.

== Production ==
=== Development ===
In September 2006, NBC announced that the third episode of the season would be titled "One Giant Leap". The episode was written by co-executive producer Jeph Loeb, and directed by co-executive producer Greg Beeman. This was Loeb's first writing credit, and Beeman's first directing credit.

== Reception ==
=== Viewers ===
In its original American broadcast, "One Giant Leap" was seen by an estimated 13.34 million household viewers with a 4.7 in the 18–49 demographics. This means that 4.7 percent of all households with televisions watched the episode. It finished 22nd out of 88 programs airing from October 9–15, 2007. This was a 2% increase in viewership from the previous episode, which was watched by an estimated 12.96 million household viewers with a 4.6 in the 18–49 demographics.

=== Critical reviews ===
"One Giant Leap" received mostly positive reviews from critics. Robert Canning of IGN gave the episode a "great" 8 out of 10 and wrote, "With so much occurring in this episode, it's a good sign that nothing is boring or uninteresting. Hiro continues to shine as the lone individual who is fully embracing his superpowers. And if they continue to deliver these surprise endings - this week Claire wakes up mid-autopsy, ribs exposed - Heroes will always leave you wanting more."

Alan Sepinwall wrote, "I was enjoying Heroes for most of the first three episodes, but it wasn't until we got to that final shot of Claire on the autopsy table that I knew I was in for the long haul. Any show willing to vivisect a cheerleader on network TV, I'm in favor of. Tim Kring may not be much of a comic fan, but he and his writers keep coming up with these great cliffhangers." Angel Cohn of TV Guide wrote, "aside from the blatant product placement for the Nissan Versa, I really enjoyed this episode a lot. It was well rounded, and since the characters just keep developing, it is all the more intriguing. This is rapidly becoming my favorite new show of the season, and I can't wait until next week to see what happens."

Michael Canfield of TV Squad wrote, "Sadly, this episode struck me as disjointed and I'm more annoyed with nagging little questions like those above than anything else." Television Without Pity gave the episode a "B–" grade.
