= I Am Sylar =

- Heroes episode
- Tom Miller's corpse with the note "I AM SYLAR" written with his blood on the back wall.
- Episode no.: Season 3 Episode 24
- Directed by: Allan Arkush
- Written by: Adam Armus & Kay Foster
- Production code: 324
- Original air date: April 20, 2009

Guest appearances
- Noah Gray-Cabey as Micah Sanders; Ellen Greene as Virginia Gray; Lisa Lackey as Janice Parkman; Gabriel Olds as Agent Taub; Clint Howard as Tom Miller; Željko Ivanek as Emile Danko; Reginald James as Agent Harper

Episode chronology
← Previous "1961"	Next → "An Invisible Thread"
- Heroes season 3

"I Am Sylar" is the twenty-fourth and penultimate episode of the third season of the NBC superhero drama series Heroes and fifty-eighth episode overall. The episode aired on April 20, 2009. It is the penultimate episode of season 3, and volume 4.

== Plot ==
The episode opens with the scene from the previous episode, showing Angela Petrelli and the group seeing Nathan Petrelli, actually Sylar, giving a press conference on TV. The episode then recounts what happened 18 hours earlier.

Sylar has an identity crisis after being forced by Emile Danko to impersonate an agent. Danko suggests Sylar find an "anchor" to remind himself of who he really is. Sylar finds one in his late mother's effects, and begins having conversations with her by taking her form. Sylar acquires an ability from a target of the agency, who had been contacted by "Rebel". Danko's agency tracks Rebel to an abandoned warehouse. Sylar reaches Micah first. Micah, however, offers help with his identity crisis. Sylar protects him, leading Danko's men away, and faking Micah's death. After Micah witnesses Sylar in a conversation with his mother, Sylar sends him off; before leaving, Micah proposes Sylar turn into Nathan Petrelli to convince the President to terminate the agency.

Matt Parkman contacts his ex-wife, Janice Parkman, telling her their son is safe. Hiro Nakamura and Ando Masahashi plan to raid Building 26, and want Matt to join them, though he doesn't want to abandon his son. As he and his son reunite with Janice, Matt telepathically discovers Danko's men stationed outside her house, and tells Janice to leave. Initially intending to go with them, Matt changes his mind after seeing his police badge, deciding to help Hiro and Ando. As agents enter the house, Matt uses his telepathy to hide his family.

Hiro and Ando head to Isaac Mendez's old loft, where they plan to sound the alarm for Ando to be captured and Hiro to follow the men back to their headquarters. Soon Danko's men attack; Hiro stops time, but finds Ando unaffected, as he was touching him. Hiro tricks him into getting hit with taser darts, and dresses as one of the commandos to accompany them with the captured Ando to Building 26. On the way, Hiro slips up, forcing Ando to disable everyone in the van. They use a G.P.S. device to discover Building 26. Outside the building, Hiro attempts to stop time, but gets a headache and a large nosebleed. Elsewhere, Noah Bennet, Claire Bennet, and Angela Petrelli are stopped at a roadblock. A team of commando units moves in on them. Mohinder Suresh, still at Coyote Sands investigating his father's work, is also captured by Danko's agents.

Sylar visits Nathan's office, and finds his toothbrush, allowing him to contact his DNA and morph into him. Sylar then gives his press conference on TV. Nathan decides to confront him, and Peter also goes. Nathan meets Sylar in his office, where Sylar claims he will be a better version of him. As Sylar is about to kill Nathan, Nathan is shot with a taser dart by Danko, who orders Sylar to return to work as his agent, which Sylar refuses. Danko impales Sylar in the back of the head with a knife, but as he is about to call a clean-up crew, Sylar rises and removes the knife, unaffected.

== Critical reception ==
Steve Heisler of The A.V. Club rated this episode a F.

Robert Canning of IGN gave the episode 7.5 out of 10.
