= Seven Minutes to Midnight (Heroes) =

- Heroes episode
- Episode no.: Season 1 Episode 8
- Directed by: Paul Edwards
- Written by: Tim Kring
- Cinematography by: John Aronson
- Editing by: Donn Aron
- Original release date: November 13, 2006
- Running time: 43 minutes

Guest appearances
- Clea DuVall as Audrey Hanson; Zachary Quinto as Sylar; Jack Coleman as Noah Bennet; Matthew John Armstrong as Ted Sprague; Lisa Lackey as Janice Parkman; Nora Zehetner as Eden McCain; James Kyson as Ando Masahashi

Episode chronology
← Previous "Better Halves"	Next → "Homecoming"
- Heroes season 1

"Seven Minutes to Midnight" is the eighth episode of the first season of the American superhero drama television series Heroes. The episode was written by series creator Tim Kring, and directed by Paul Edwards. It originally aired on NBC on November 13, 2006.

The series tells the stories of ordinary people who discover that they have superhuman abilities and how these abilities take effect in the characters' lives as they work together to prevent catastrophic futures. In the episode, Hiro and Ando meet diner waitress Charlie Andrews, another superhuman targeted by Sylar, while Mohinder is persuaded by a dream into continuing his research.

According to Nielsen Media Research, the episode was seen by an estimated 15.08 million household viewers and gained a 5.3 ratings share among adults aged 18–49, making it the most watched episode of the series by then. The episode received mixed reviews from critics, with many feeling that the series continues introducing more storylines and characters without properly developing them.

== Plot ==
Mohinder returns to India to scatter his father's ashes. He debates whether to return to his job as a college professor. His former girlfriend Mira invites him to interview for a job at a company doing genetics research where she has just been made a department head. However, she says he must not mention his father's research into the evolution of superpowers or consider continuing it. Moving into his father's office, Mohinder sees a running program on the computer; after pressing delete, an "are you sure you want to quit" message appears on the screen and Mohinder hesitates to select yes.

Mohinder talks with his mother about her decision to let his father go to the United States to look for Sylar. His mother tells him for the first time about his sister, Shanti, who died when she was five, two years after Mohinder was born. Shanti was "special", according to her mother, and their father loved her so much that he was afraid Mohinder would find his love for his son wanting in comparison. Mohinder also has a series of dreams, depicting a young Indian boy who guides him to various scenes showing his parents arguing and showing his father's murder in his taxi cab by a man whose face was obscured, but was wearing a watch with a broken face, showing seven minutes to twelve (or midnight). After another dream where the boy was trying to get into a locked drawer in Mohinder's desk, Mohinder realizes the key in his father's journal was to that drawer, and opens it, finding a file titled "SANJOG, Iyer", containing a photo of the boy.

Continuing their journey to New York, Hiro and Ando stop at a diner in Midland, Texas, and meet a waitress named Charlie, who recently developed a near perfect ability to quickly memorize any information.

As Hiro talks to Charlie, the man in the baseball cap who earlier had attempted to kidnap Molly from FBI custody — Sylar — is watching them talk. As he does so, he uses telekinesis to draw a cup of coffee to his hand from across the table. He also is shown wearing the same watch as the murderer of Mohinder's father, which also is set to seven minutes to midnight. Charlie is later found murdered in the diner's storeroom, with her brain removed in the same manner as Sylar's victims.

Hiro tells Ando that he can prevent Charlie's death by going back in time to the day before and preventing her from going to work; however, Hiro fails to return five seconds after his departure, as he promised Ando he would. A worried Ando paces next to a wall of pictures, which he does not notice. One of the pictures, which before had shown Charlie with a birthday cake in the diner, now shows Hiro as well, implying that he went further back in time than just the day before.

At the FBI office in Los Angeles, Matt Parkman and Agent Hanson are interrogating Ted Sprague, who becomes so agitated that he boils the glass of water in his hands using his power to emit radiation. During the interrogation, Sprague reveals that, like Matt, he saw the Haitian just before blacking out for two days, and when he awoke, he had two mysterious marks on his neck. However, before Matt can learn more, Homeland Security takes custody of Sprague, who tells Matt to find the Haitian.

Matt has been suspended without pay for a month after having punched a superior officer who had an affair with Matt's wife. Matt's wife admits to her affair and asks Matt if their marriage is over. Matt says he doesn't know, but their conversation is cut off by a phone call from Audrey, who notifies Matt that Sprague has escaped from custody, leaving behind a burning car.

At the Odessa, Texas paper factory where Mr. Bennet works, Bennet tells Isaac, whom Eden has kidnapped from his apartment in New York, that he and his associates have worked for a number of years to find people with special powers and to assist them in learning to use them. Sometimes, he says, there are unintended consequences. Fourteen years ago, a woman with special powers died in his custody, leaving behind a toddler daughter. Mr. Bennet and his wife, who were having trouble conceiving a child, adopted the little girl. Mr. Bennet said Claire's appearance in his life was like a miracle.

However, Bennet knows that Sylar will kill Claire the next night, and he needs Isaac to help him prevent the incident by completing a painting of Claire being murdered at her homecoming game. Bennet has collected three previous paintings Isaac created that depict a terrified Claire close-up, running up the bleachers in a football stadium, and lying dead on the ground with the top of her skull removed. When Isaac says he is unable to paint without the use of heroin, and resists taking the drug, Mr. Bennet orders Eden to administer the drug. Back at the Bennet household that evening, Claire paints a banner for the homecoming celebration the next night, unaware of her father's concerns for her safety.

== Production ==
=== Development ===
In October 2006, NBC announced that the eighth episode of the season would be titled "Seven Minutes to Midnight". The episode was written by series creator Tim Kring, and directed by Paul Edwards. This was Kring's third writing credit, and Edwards' first directing credit.

== Reception ==
=== Viewers ===
In its original American broadcast, "Seven Minutes to Midnight" was seen by an estimated 15.08 million household viewers with a 5.3 in the 18–49 demographics. This means that 5.3 percent of all households with televisions watched the episode. It finished 16th out of 99 programs airing from November 13–19, 2007. This was a 4% increase in viewership from the previous episode, which was watched by an estimated 14.47 million household viewers with a 5.1 in the 18–49 demographics.

=== Critical reviews ===
"Seven Minutes to Midnight" received mixed reviews from critics. Robert Canning of IGN gave the episode an "okay" 6.8 out of 10 and wrote, "While this episode was successful in condensing the amount of storylines it was covering, it still frustrated by introducing new mysteries without advancing the bigger picture. Heroes has more than enough material to work with, so let's hope they actually work with it in future episodes."

Alan Sepinwall wrote, "The Mohinder scenes lost my interest after a while, so I'm not clear on whether he has some kind of Dream Girl-esque power, or if the soccer ball kid is someone else entirely who's dropping by Mohinder's dreams. Still, they're introducing a whole lotta new "heroes" in a very short span, which both keeps things interesting and also gives them license to get rid of a character or three if need be. The shot of Charlie opening the can while Sylar did the same to her skull was suitably creepy, and I like the idea of Hiro being stranded in Charlie's past for a while." Angel Cohn of TV Guide wrote, "If Horn-rimmed Glasses has been tracking people for more than 14 years, and Papa Suresh thought that his daughter was special back when Mohinder was 2 years old, then not all the gifts miraculously started appearing within the last few weeks, around the time of the eclipse. That massively opens this world, allowing an infinite number of heroes of varying ages to be spread out all over the world. I can only imagine who is next, and if they'll be involved with the "save the cheerleader" campaign."

Michael Canfield of TV Squad wrote, "A so-so episode overall, with a few cool moments. I did think it was kind of fun that the Texas waitress didn't even know she had a power yet: just thinking it kind of curious that her memory lately had been very, very good. "It's kind of a skill, I guess," she says." Television Without Pity gave the episode a "B" grade.
