= One of Us, One of Them =

- Heroes episode
- Noah and his new partner deal with a hostage situation.
- Episode no.: Season 3 Episode 3
- Directed by: Sergio Mimica-Gezzan
- Written by: Joe Pokaski
- Production code: 303
- Original air date: September 29, 2008

Guest appearances
- Noah Gray-Cabey as Micah Sanders; Jessalyn Gilsig as Meredith Gordon; Ashley Crow as Sandra Bennet; Jimmy Jean-Louis as the Haitian; Jamie Hector as Knox; Francis Capra as Jesse Murphy; Brea Grant as Daphne Millbrook; Blake Shields as Flint Gordon, Jr.; Ronald Guttman as Dr. Zimmerman; Ntare Guma Mbaho Mwine as Usutu; Janel Parrish as May; Olga Sosnovska as Angela's aide; Ken Lally as the German; Randall Bentley as Lyle Bennet; Tehmina Sunny as Bridget Bailey

Episode chronology
← Previous "The Butterfly Effect"	Next → "I Am Become Death"
- Heroes season 3

"One of Us, One of Them" is the third episode of the third season of the NBC superhero drama series Heroes and thirty-seventh episode overall. It was written by Joe Pokaski and directed by Sergio Mimica-Gezzan. The episode aired on September 29, 2008.

== Plot ==
Tracy travels to New Orleans to learn more about Niki Sanders. At the funeral, she meets Niki's now-orphaned son Micah. Micah discovers that Tracy and Niki were born on the same day, in the same hospital and with the same doctor: a man named Zimmerman. Tracy leaves to meet Zimmerman and find out more about her origin.

Knox, Flint, and The German, rob a bank as Present Peter does his best to keep peace. When Bennet and Sylar arrive at the bank, Future Peter freezes time and leaves with Present Peter. Sylar uses his telekinesis to stop Knox from punching Bennet. Bennet arrests Flint and walks out of the bank. Sylar gives in to his "hunger" and locks all the doors so he can kill Jesse. Knox takes the opportunity to escape.

Hiro and Ando have a run-in with the Haitian while following Daphne. They knock the Haitian out and get the formula, but Daphne manages to steal it from them. Hiro and Ando are arrested and taken to Level 2 in the Company.

In Africa, Matt Parkman continues his visit with the strange native who has precognitive painting powers, similar to those of Isaac Mendez.

Tracy visits Zimmerman at his home in California, where he tells her he created her.

== Critical reception ==
Sean O'Neal of The A.V. Club rated this episode a D.

Robert Canning of IGN gave the episode 7.6 out of 10.
