= An Invisible Thread =

- Heroes episode
- Nathan Petrelli watches Sylar's funeral pyre, unaware that the body is that of shape-shifter James Martin and that he is the real Sylar.
- Episode no.: Season 3 Episode 25
- Directed by: Greg Beeman
- Written by: Tim Kring
- Production code: 325
- Original air date: April 27, 2009

Guest appearances
- Michael Dorn as President; Michael B. Silver as Liam Samuels; Gabriel Olds as Agent Taub; Željko Ivanek as Emile Danko; Reginald James as Agent Harper; Daniel Newman as Jimmy Keppler

Episode chronology
← Previous "I Am Sylar"	Next → "Orientation"
- Heroes season 3

"An Invisible Thread" is the twenty-fifth and final episode of the third season of the NBC superhero drama series Heroes and fifty-ninth episode overall. The episode aired on April 27, 2009. It marked the end of the Fugitives volume, as well as its 2008-2009 season run. It ended with a brief introduction to the next volume, entitled Redemption.

== Plot ==
Beginning from where the previous episode ended, Sylar is unaffected after Emile Danko had stabbed him in the back of the head. Sylar explains that his shape-shifting ability has moved the weak spot; he then morphs into Danko and kills an agent, framing Danko and detaining him.

Meanwhile, it is revealed that when Noah Bennet had been stopped at the roadblock, Claire Bennet and Angela Petrelli were not in the vehicle, as Noah had realized there was a set-up. Claire and Angela head to the Capitol building in Washington, D.C., where Angela tells Claire to find her father, Nathan Petrelli. Having received a premonition, Angela leaves to find Matt Parkman, explaining Matt will be vital in saving Nathan. Claire meets Nathan in his office, actually Sylar in disguise, and accompanies him to meet with the President: she intends to alert him, and Sylar intends to become him. As the two are directed to a suite to wait, Claire notices "Nathan" using the wrong hand to sign his name and deduces who he is. Sylar takes her hostage.

Following his nosebleed, Hiro Nakamura manages to stop time, and he and Ando Masahashi break into Building 26. Finding prisoners, they begin to release them, with Hiro experiencing dizziness and bleeding from his ear. Mohinder Suresh, one of the prisoners, tells Hiro that his body is rejecting his power, which could kill him. In the facility, the detained Danko and Noah agree to work together to take down Sylar, and obtain a tranquilizer. Hiro prevents a betrayal from Danko and collapses, while Noah calls Claire, with Sylar answering her cell.

Peter Petrelli finds his brother, and the two head to find Sylar and Claire, reaching their room just as she is thrown out. Nathan and Peter have a brief duel with Sylar; Sylar and Nathan fly off. Peter confirms to Claire he has taken Sylar's power, and the two meet Noah. Nathan crash-lands into a room with Sylar; the serial killer slits Nathan's throat, killing him. Using disguises, Sylar makes his way to the President, who stabs him with a tranquilizer, revealing himself as Peter (having acquired Sylar's shape-shifting).

Angela finds Matt exiting a bus, en route to Building 26. She convinces him to help, and they find the room where Nathan is. Angela is horrified to find Nathan's dead body. Noah brings them the unconscious Sylar, and he and Angela convince a very reluctant Matt to alter Sylar's mind to believe he is Nathan, reasoning that he was the only person who could shut down any future "Agency". Matt succeeds, causing Sylar to take on Nathan's appearance and identity. The three agree to keep Nathan's death a secret. Volume Four ends with Claire, Noah, Angela, Peter, "Nathan", Mohinder, Matt, Ando, and a recovered Hiro gathered around the burning corpse of James Martin, who looks like Sylar. The group splits, and "Nathan" confirms the President has shut down Building 26, with funds transferred so that Angela and Noah can start their own company, which Noah proposes to call "the Company".

=== Volume Five: Redemption ===
Volume Five: Redemption begins six weeks later with a former Building 26 agent arriving home to find his sink flooded. As water spreads on the floor, it forms into Tracy Strauss. She drowns the man, implying she has done so to several others. Meanwhile, Angela meets "Nathan" at his office, who is bothered by a clock ticking and observes that it is running fast, revealing that Sylar's intuitive aptitude remains intact.

== Ratings ==
Overnight figures shows that the episode attracted 6.38 million viewers, with an average rating of 3.0 in the 18-34 demographics.

== Critical reception ==
This episode received mixed-to-positive reviews by critics, especially in regards to the death of Nathan and Sylar's subsequent transformation into him.

Positive reviews include the Los Angeles Times which said that the episode was "the best ending so far" and had "edge-of-your-seat anticipation." Robert Canning of IGN said the ending was "quite possibly the coolest twist the series has ever given us" and gave the episode 8.3 out of 10.

Entertainment Weekly's Marc Bernardin praised the twist, as well as Angela's anguish over finding Nathan's body, but blasted the show for not showing the fight between Peter, Nathan, and Sylar.

Negative reviews include the Boston Herald, which said that Heroes "... makes Deal or No Deal look brilliant." and the New York Post who called the Sylar/Nathan twist "probably one of the worst decisions Heroes has ever made. And that's saying a lot!"

The A.V. Club brought together the three reviewers of Heroes' third season, Steve Heisler, Josh Modell and Sean O'Neal and included a live blog in the review. They rated this episode a D−, calling the show "Still stupid after all these hour."
