= Six Months Ago =

- Heroes episode
- Episode no.: Season 1 Episode 10
- Directed by: Allan Arkush
- Written by: Aron Eli Coleite
- Cinematography by: John Aronson
- Editing by: Michael S. Murphy
- Original release date: November 27, 2006
- Running time: 43 minutes

Guest appearances
- Lisa Lackey as Janice Parkman; Zachary Quinto as Sylar; Cristine Rose as Angela Petrelli; James Kyson as Ando Masahashi; Jimmy Jean-Louis as The Haitian

Episode chronology
← Previous "Homecoming"	Next → "Fallout"
- Heroes season 1

"Six Months Ago" is the tenth episode of the first season of the American superhero drama television series Heroes. The episode was written by co-producer Aron Eli Coleite, and directed by executive producer Allan Arkush. It originally aired on NBC on November 27, 2006.

The series tells the stories of ordinary people who discover that they have superhuman abilities and how these abilities take effect in the characters' lives as they work together to prevent catastrophic futures. In the episode, Hiro travels back in time in order to save Charlie, only to realize that her fate is sealed.

According to Nielsen Media Research, the episode was seen by an estimated 15.56 million household viewers and gained a 5.5 ratings share among adults aged 18–49. It received mostly positive reviews from critics, who praised the character development and answers to some of the series' mysteries, although some were critical of Matt's role in the episode.

== Plot ==
Hiro Nakamura arrives at the Burnt Toast Diner six months in the past after attempting to go back only a single day. Charlie, the waitress he is there to save, serves him.

Jackie arrives at Claire's bedroom and informs Claire that she got her the open cheerleading position. Jackie is surprised at Claire's lack of enthusiasm and threatens to give the position to someone else.

A struggle ensues for the outfit, ending with Claire's hand crashing through a glass cabinet door after both girls lose their grip. Her mother helps clean the wound before taking her to the emergency room. Mr. Bennet then receives a phone call from Chandra, who tells Mr. Bennet that they must speak about Claire.

Hiro continues his attempts to explain to Charlie that he teleported from the future. As it rains outside, Hiro realizes that he teleported back too far, since it was not raining the day before he teleported, and it is, in fact, Charlie's birthday in April. He considers trying to teleport again, but is afraid of where he might end up and decides against it.

Hiro brings a newspaper to the diner and shows Charlie the results of a Japanese baseball game where the Swallows beat the Dragons. Hiro comments on how flawlessly she reads the Japanese article after only one day, but her skepticism has not waned. They begin to discuss origami. Charlie comments that a person who folds a thousand cranes will be granted one wish. Hiro then uses his powers to stop time and fill the diner with 1000 cranes on strings, and also offers her a one-way ticket to Japan. He states that he doesn't care if she believes him, but only wishes for her to accompany him to Japan.

At Chandra's apartment, Chandra talks to Gabriel while performing some tests. Chandra asks Gabriel why he did not change professions instead of fixing clocks like his father, to which Gabriel references a phrase from Chandra's book about "evolutionary imperative," claiming that evolution compels creatures towards certain behaviors.

Chandra appears to be disappointed upon completing the tests, telling Gabriel that he appears to be "healthy." Gabriel is also disappointed and asks whether Chandra will perform additional tests. Chandra says he may have been wrong; Gabriel may not have any special powers, despite being on his list. Gabriel begs for more tests to be done, but Chandra says there are others in need of his time. Gabriel browses through folders of other suspected evolved humans and asks whether he thinks Brian Davis, who Chandra suspects of being telekinetic, is important or whether Chandra will give up on him too, getting him kicked out. Gabriel's temper causes Chandra to make him leave.

On the street, Gabriel glances at Brian Davis's name and address, written on the Post-It he took off the folder. As Gabriel leaves, Mr. Bennet exits a cab and approaches the building.

Gabriel is repairing another pocket watch at his shop when Brian Davis enters, explaining that someone called him. Gabriel tells him that he made the call. He glances down at the watch on the table and sees the name "Sylar" on the face and introduces himself to Brian Davis as "Gabriel Sylar." Brian stares at a mug on Gabriel's desk and manages to slide it across the desk telekinetically, then asking if Gabriel can make it go away, surprising him. Brian tells him he does not know what the ability is, but he doesn't want it. Gabriel then picks up a crystal from the table and kills Brian.

Gabriel meets with Chandra again and demonstrates telekinetic power by moving a glass across the table until it is moved off the table and the glass flies and smashes against the wall. Gabriel apologizes for his previous behavior, and Chandra understands his anger. Gabriel tells him that he feels different now, as if he has a chance to start over with a new life and new purpose. He tells Chandra, "We can change the world." Gabriel tells Chandra that all the others are waiting to be told of their importance and their true potential.

== Production ==
=== Development ===
In November 2006, NBC announced that the tenth episode of the season would be titled "Homecoming". The episode was written by co-producer Aron Eli Coleite, and directed by executive producer Allan Arkush. This was Coleite's first writing credit, and Arkush's second directing credit.

== Reception ==
=== Viewers ===
In its original American broadcast, "Six Months Ago" was seen by an estimated 15.56 million household viewers with a 5.5 in the 18–49 demographics. This means that 5.5 percent of all households with televisions watched the episode. It finished 11th out of 97 programs airing from November 27-December 3, 2006. This was a 3% decrease in viewership from the previous episode, which was watched by an estimated 16.03 million household viewers with a 5.7 in the 18–49 demographics.

=== Critical reviews ===
"Six Months Ago" received mostly positive reviews from critics. Robert Canning of IGN gave the episode a "great" 8 out of 10 and wrote, "We already knew he failed the detective's exam, and the reveal of his dyslexia wasn't worth the ten minutes of screen time that could have been spent with a more interesting story. Still, the good here easily out weighed the bad."

Alan Sepinwall wrote, "When TV shows do flashback episodes to events that happened before the pilot, there's a tendency to cram every significant event in each characters' backstory into the span of a couple of days. Heroes was definitely guilty of this, but it was still a very strong episode, arguably better than last week's This Is The One You've Been Waiting For confrontation between Peter and Sylar." Angel Cohn of TV Guide wrote, "While I found the pacing of this episode a little bit off, I still thoroughly enjoyed that it filled in a lot of the blanks. One big flashback episode to six months prior and we've found out so very much."

Michael Canfield of TV Squad wrote, "Like Hiro, we're headed six months into the past. We see some characters showing up in unexpected locations. We get answers. We get lots of answers, in fact, proving once again a show doesn't need to keeps its audience wholly in the dark to sustain interest. Hurray for Tim Kring." Television Without Pity gave the episode an "A–" grade.
