= Genesis (Heroes) =

- Heroes episode
- Claire Bennet in a burning train. This file has been proposed for deletion and may be deleted after Sunday, 22 November 2026. Click on file page link to object.
- Episode no.: Season 1 Episode 1
- Directed by: David Semel
- Written by: Tim Kring
- Production code: 101
- Original air date: September 25, 2006

Guest appearances
- Cristine Rose as Angela Petrelli; Jack Coleman as Mr. Bennet; Ashley Crow as Sandra Bennet; Thomas Dekker as Zach; Shishir Kurup as Nirand; James Kyson Lee as Ando Masahashi; John Prosky as Principal; Deirdre Quinn as Tina; Randall Bentley as Lyle Bennet; Richard Roundtree as Charles Deveaux; Brian Tarantina as Weasel

Episode chronology
| ← Previous — | Next → "Don't Look Back" |
- Heroes season 1

"Genesis" is the pilot episode of the NBC superhero drama series Heroes. It was directed by David Semel and written by Tim Kring. The episode focuses on several of the main characters discovering their superpowers for the first time, and attempting to find out more about them. Some cast members, including Greg Grunberg and Leonard Roberts, do not appear in this episode, and are introduced later in the season (scenes including Grunberg were originally included in this episode but were cut before it aired).

== Synopsis ==
Various people around the world discover evidence of real superpowers. Claire Bennet can instantly heal physical injuries to her own body. Isaac Mendez can precognitively paint future events. Hiro Nakamura is able to manipulate time, travel through it, and even teleport. Peter Petrelli has dreams of himself flying in Manhattan. Niki Sanders witnesses a more violent and aggressive personality of herself in mirrors. Mohinder Suresh tries to continue his recently deceased father's work by finding these people.

== Plot ==
As the series pilot, "Genesis" establishes the stories of most of the main characters, as well as the series' premise. Robert Canning of IGN describes the episode as "short on action", but with "much to look forward to."

The central theme of human evolution, and the potential for superhuman changes, is introduced by the character of Mohinder Suresh, a genetics professor in Madras, India. After receiving news of the death of his father, Chandra Suresh, Mohinder goes to New York to finish Chandra's research, believing it was the reason he was murdered. Mohinder's story also introduces the idea of an underlying conspiracy involving the "heroes". At his father's apartment in India, he hears (but does not see) a mysterious person searching the apartment. The same man later gets into Mohinder's taxi, asking him several suspicious questions before Mohinder flees.

Two storylines in particular reflect a darker perspective on the newfound abilities. Isaac Mendez is a painter and heroin addict in New York City. He claims that he can paint the future, but his girlfriend, Simone Deveaux, believes it is merely the influence of narcotics. Later, following a severe overdose, he paints a mural of a nuclear explosion destroying Manhattan. Niki Sanders, a webcam stripper in Las Vegas, Nevada, discovers her abilities when she and her son Micah are forced to flee from thugs approaching their house. During the escape, Niki believes she sees a reflection that is not her. She leaves Micah with a friend and returns home, where the thugs coerce her into stripping. She blacks out during the performance, awakening some time later to find that they have been savagely killed. Her strange reflection motions for her to keep silent. Both Isaac and Niki find their powers to be "an unwelcome change that they are forced to deal with."

Meanwhile, Hiro Nakamura, an office worker in Tokyo, Japan, discovers he can control the passage of time. Hiro is presented in a lighter, happier manner than the other characters, and as someone who is excited about the changes happening to him. His friend and co-worker, Ando Masahashi, is skeptical, even after Hiro proves it to him by teleporting into the women's restroom at a bar. Hiro believes he is meant for something more, but Ando disagrees. Later, Hiro successfully teleports from a subway in Tokyo to New York City's Times Square.

Other characters include Claire Bennet, a high school cheerleader in Odessa, Texas, who has discovered that she regenerates from any injuries, and has her classmate Zach film her doing such things. She believes that if discovered, life as she knows it would be over. Heading home, they come across a fiery train wreck, from which Claire saves a man, escaping unharmed.

Peter Petrelli's story crosses paths with many of the other characters. A hospice nurse in New York, Peter has recurring dreams of flying. He tells his brother, congressional candidate Nathan Petrelli, that he believes he can fly. Nathan responds by saying that Peter should put his time to better use. Peter tells his mother that he has a metaphysical connection with Nathan, but his mother is skeptical. Simone, who is the daughter of one of Peter's patients, tells him to bring morphine to Isaac's apartment. There, Peter sees a painting of himself flying. At the end of the episode, he summons Nathan to an alley in the middle of the city. Peter leaps off of the roof of an adjacent building attempting to fly, but instead it is Nathan who flies up and catches him, only to lose his grip and drop Peter. Kring credits the direct concept and idea for this last scene to Damon Lindelof, producer of Lost.

== Symbolism and recurring themes ==
The episode features a solar eclipse, which would become a recurring element throughout the series. An eclipse forms part of the series' logo, and also occurs in the season one finale, "How to Stop an Exploding Man". As well, an image of the Earth eclipsing the Sun as viewed from an observation point away from the Earth, is used in the series' title sequence.

When the total solar eclipse occurs in "Genesis", it is witnessed directly by Peter, Claire, Hiro, and Niki, as well as indirectly by Isaac. It is implied that the event is seen simultaneously in New York, Texas, Nevada, Japan, and California, although this is impossible in the real world, as the umbra is at most a few hundred miles wide. In fact, the Solar Eclipse that occurred on September 22, 2006 (the date closest to this episode's airdate), was annular in Guyana, Suriname and French Guiana and partial in South America, West Africa, southern Africa, the Antarctic Peninsula, and East Antarctica. It was not total anywhere. Early in the episode, Micah is making a pinhole camera through which to witness the eclipse.

The scenes involving Claire's excursion into the train wreck and Mr. Bennet getting into Mohinder's cab as Peter leaves were used again in Season 3's namesake Chapter Eight, "Villains," showing the events that happened before or during the two scenes, explaining what caused the train to crash. Similarly, one of the last episodes of season 3 and volume 4, "1961", explains why Angela steals socks, something she did in this episode.

The mural of the nuclear blast in New York becomes one of the show's major plotlines for the first season and volume. Throughout the first season, much of the plot revolves around the events the heroes face in trying to prevent the nuclear explosion from happening and ultimately succeed in How to Stop an Exploding Man.

In "Cold Wars", Matt Parkman, who has developed precognition as well, paints a mural of the nuclear destruction of Washington D.C. exactly where Isaac's mural in this episode is and looking exactly the same except a different city.

== Production ==
=== Narration ===
Introduction:

Where does it come from? This quest... this need to solve life's mysteries for the simplest of questions can never be answered. Why are we here? What is the soul? Why do we dream? Perhaps we would be better off not looking at all. Not delving, not yearning. That's not human nature, not the human heart. That is not why we are here.

Conclusion:

This quest... this need to solve life's mysteries. In the end what does it matter when the human heart can only find meaning in the smallest of moments? They're here... among us... in the shadows, in the light, everywhere. Do they even know yet?

=== DVD Director's Cut version ===
On the Season 1 DVD release, the original 74 minute long pilot is included. This version had significant differences with many characters and overall plots, compared with the pilot episode which ultimately aired.

- A subplot was cut that involved an engineer (played by Omid Abtahi) with radiation-based powers and ties to an Islamic terrorist cell. The terrorist cell was responsible for the train derailment in Odessa, Texas where Claire saved a fireman. The overall plot for the cell had to do with acquiring nuclear fuel for a bomb being created. Matt Parkman was to be connected to the engineer, as they were childhood friends and lived together for a short time. Elements of the engineer character, including inducing cancer in his wife, were reused for the character of Ted Sprague. The leader of the terrorist cell was played by Ntare Mwine, who went on to play the African pre-cog painter character of Usutu starting from Season 3.
- Matt Parkman finds one of the members of the terrorist cell hiding underneath the stairs. This was remade later with Matt finding Molly Walker the same way. Also, a different actress played the role of Matt's wife.
- Sylar is introduced as Paul Sylar instead of an alias for Gabriel Gray. Sylar is shown making contact with Mohinder by the end of the episode.
- Isaac Mendez handcuffs himself to a pipe to try and go cold turkey from heroin. He later cuts off his hand with a saw and subsequently overdoses.
- Micah steals $300 from Tina and leaves on his own, apparently to buy a bus ticket to Moab, Utah where his father (DL) is imprisoned at the Moab Federal Penitentiary.
- DL is introduced as being an inmate at the Moab Federal Penitentiary. His power of being able to phase through solid objects manifests while he is sleeping and he wakes up in different spots in the prison outside his cell. In this version of the pilot, he has a vendetta against Nathan as Nathan was the prosecutor responsible for his imprisonment.
- Unlike the "leaked" version, the director's cut used the original series' music.

=== Legal issues ===
On October 2, 2006, Emerson Electric Company, an appliance market competitor of NBC's owner General Electric, filed suit in federal court against NBC. The suit was in regard to the scene when Claire Bennet reached into an active garbage disposal unit—labeled "InSinkErator"—to retrieve a ring and severely disfigured her hand. Emerson claimed the scene "casts the disposer in an unsavory light, irreparably tarnishing the product" by suggesting serious injuries would result "in the event consumers were to accidentally insert their hand into one." Emerson had asked for a ruling barring future broadcasts of the pilot, which was previously available on NBC's website and had already aired on NBC Universal-owned cable networks USA Network and The Sci Fi Channel. It also sought to block NBC from using any Emerson trademarks.

On February 23, 2007, the case against NBC was dropped. NBC Universal and Emerson Electric reached an agreement to settle the lawsuit outside of court. The episode in question was briefly unavailable in the iTunes Store, but an edited version was soon made available for download. A non-edited version of the episode was shown in the BBC Two premiere on July 25, 2007. The DVD and HD DVD releases contain an edited version where the "InSinkErator" label has been removed from the scene.

== Reception ==
Heroes director/producer Greg Beeman considers the premiere to be "exciting" and "inspiring". IGN.com's Robert Canning described the episode as "creating a realistic, modern day world where ordinary people have suddenly found themselves blessed (or cursed, depending) with extraordinary abilities." This episode was submitted for consideration in the categories of "Outstanding Drama Series", "Outstanding Writing in a Drama Series" and "Outstanding Supporting Actor in a Drama Series" on Santiago Cabrera's behalf for the 59th Primetime Emmy Awards.

The total viewership for this episode was 14.3 million.
