= The Wall (Heroes) =

- Heroes episode
- Peter and Sylar try to break through the wall manifested in Sylar's nightmare world.
- Episode no.: Season 4 Episode 18
- Directed by: Allan Arkush
- Written by: Adam Armus and Kay Foster
- Production code: 418
- Original air date: February 1, 2010

Guest appearances
- Ashley Crow as Sandra Bennet; Madeline Zima as Gretchen Berg; Jimmy Jean-Louis as the Haitian; Deanne Bray as Emma Coolidge; Elisabeth Röhm as Lauren Gilmore; Todd Stashwick as Eli; Sherri Saum as Kate Bennet; Stephen Monroe Taylor as Richard; Eric Roberts as Eric Thompson; Harry Perry as Damien

Episode chronology
← Previous "The Art of Deception"	Next → "Brave New World"
- Heroes season 4

"The Wall" is the eighteenth and penultimate episode of the fourth season of the NBC superhero drama series Heroes, and the seventy-sixth episode overall. The episode aired on February 1, 2010.

== Plot ==
Lauren Gilmore enters the carnival in order to find some medical supplies to clean her bullet wound when she is confronted by Emma Coolidge who begins to tend to her wound. She reveals that she came with the intent to stop Samuel Sullivan whom she tells Emma has done very bad things and has manipulated the people of the carnival like the guru of a cult. When Samuel approaches to visit Emma, Lauren hides, only to have Emma tell Samuel she is there. When Samuel confronts her, he gets Eli to deal with her, but she escapes.

Samuel still wishes for Claire Bennet to join his carnival family, so in one final move, he brings Claire to her father who is being held in the House of Mirrors.Damien reveals Noah Bennet's past memories to Claire in hopes that she will lose all respect for her father and join him. This prompts Claire to storm out of the House of Mirrors and confront Samuel, who uses his ability to trap Claire and her father underground as the carnival packs up to head to Central Park.

Upon entering the mental prison Matt Parkman trapped Sylar in, Peter Petrelli yells out in the hope that Sylar will answer and he will be able to find him. Sylar hears a noise, and shifts himself to street level where he confronts Peter. Peter reveals to Sylar that he intends to free him from the nightmare. While reluctantly accepting what Peter tells him, Sylar dares him to free them, only to have Peter fail in his attempt. Peter then proceeds to simply avoid Sylar, with months seeming to go by. When they finally start talking again, Sylar reveals he does not really want to escape for he feels he deserves this punishment. Just then, a brick wall manifests in front of them, which Peter realizes they must break through in order to escape. Peter sledges away at it for years, while Sylar attempts to apologize for killing his brother. Eventually, Peter learns to let go of his anger, forgive Sylar and accept that he is truly a changed man, thus allowing them to break through the wall and escape the mental prison.

== Critical reception ==
Steve Heisler of The A.V. Club rated this episode a C−.

Robert Canning of IGN gave the episode 7.5 out of 10.
