= Shadowboxing (Heroes) =

- Heroes episode
- The struggle between two minds over Matt's body becomes serious when Matt crosses a line Sylar thought he could not.
- Episode no.: Season 4 Episode 9
- Directed by: Jim Chory
- Written by: Misha Green and Joe Pokaski
- Production code: 409
- Original air date: November 9, 2009

Guest appearances
- Madeline Zima as Gretchen Berg; Tessa Thompson as Becky Taylor; Jimmy Jean-Louis as the Haitian; Dawn Olivieri as Lydia; Carlease Burke as Nurse Hammer; Assaf Cohen as Hesam; Candice Patton as Olivia; Deanne Bray as Emma Coolidge; Sally Champlin as Lynette

Episode chronology
← Previous "Once Upon a Time in Texas"	Next → "Brother's Keeper"
- Heroes season 4

"Shadowboxing" is the ninth episode of the fourth season of the NBC superhero drama series Heroes and sixty-seventh episode overall. The episode aired on November 9, 2009. It was viewed by 5.35 million viewers in the US.

== Plot ==
Claire Bennet, Gretchen, and the two other sorority girls are still in shock after having seen Becky Taylor turn invisible and Claire unharmed after being impaled. Claire tries to pass off the events as drug-induced hallucinations, and the group quickly leaves the slaughterhouse. Gretchen is particularly shaken after Becky had tried to strangle her, but Claire assures her everything will be fine and decides to visit the sorority house. Claire finds the two other girls have no memory of the past night, as it is revealed Claire had contacted her father Noah Bennet, who had used the Haitian to wipe their memories. Noah decides to investigate Becky's room, while he has the Haitian accompany Claire back to her room to prevent Becky from potentially ambushing her while invisible. Meanwhile, Sylar is having dreams of Nathan Petrelli's memories and finally ends up waking up in the form of him, with Nathan's mind having regained control of his body. Wandering around the carnival and not knowing where he is, Sylar as Nathan flies away after hearing voices nearby. Claire returns to her room to find Gretchen preparing to leave, who says she can't deal with this anymore, much to Claire's sadness.

After Gretchen leaves, Samuel Sullivan enters the room, who begins to explain who he is and his wish for Claire to join them. Simultaneously, Noah confronts Becky in her room, where it is revealed Becky is actually after Noah for revenge. Noah had killed her father during his time with the company, while she was just a little girl. Becky threatens both Noah and Claire, and just as Noah is about to taser her, some girls enter the room, allowing Becky to turn invisible and escape. Samuel tries to convince Claire that ordinary people simply can't understand them, which is why he chooses to live apart and among others with abilities. Claire then reveals she was simply stalling, as Noah enters the room, and demands that Samuel explain who he is. Samuel reveals that it was Emile Danko who had killed his brother, which was why Noah had encountered Edgar about the compass. Samuel wishes to just help Becky, while Noah insists he answer some more of his questions first.

As Noah moves Samuel to his car, they are ambushed by an invisible Becky, who manages to subdue Noah and free Samuel. Samuel grabs the taser and hits Becky with it to prevent her from attacking Noah. Noah recovers and aims at the two as they flee, but Claire shouts at her father not to shoot them. Later, Claire returns to her room, saddened by the loss of Gretchen, while Noah continues his investigation with the compass and Samuel. At the carnival, Becky apologizes for not being able to recruit Claire, but Samuel assures her that perhaps Claire may still have been somewhat convinced to their cause; he also promises her she will get her revenge. Lydia then informs Samuel of Sylar's disappearance, leaving him stunned.

Having taken control of Matt Parkman's body, Sylar proceeds to an airport in Los Angeles to fly to New York and ask Peter Petrelli about what happened to him, as it was the last thing he remembered. Sylar finds, however, that Matt still has some control; Sylar is detained during a baggage screening for carrying a gun, as Matt had used his powers to make it seem like Sylar had packed clothing instead of firearms. Sylar tries using Matt's ability to convince the guards otherwise, but is unable to do so. As a result, Sylar misses the flight and ends up driving instead. Along the way, Matt distracts Sylar to cause him to get a flat tire; a passing tow-truck stops by to lend a hand. Sylar then reminds Matt who is in charge by killing the tow-truck driver with a tire iron, also pointing out that he would be framing Matt for the murder. Later, Sylar stops off for a bite at the same diner in Texas where Charlie Andrews worked. Sylar threatens to kill the new waitress if Matt doesn't tell him about how he ended up in his mind. Matt complies, telling him he made Sylar believe he was Nathan, resulting in Sylar's mind being trapped in Matt's, and how he, Angela Petrelli, and Noah are the only three who know the truth. Sylar then announces his intentions to get his body back and kill everyone involved, but when he steps outside, he is confronted at gunpoint by several police officers. Matt reveals that while Sylar was doodling on a napkin earlier, Matt had caused Sylar to write a threatening message announcing his intentions to kill everyone in the diner. Matt intends to have himself killed to finish off Sylar, and manages to control his body enough to reach into his coat as if he had a gun. As a result, he is shot several times by the police officers, and as his body collapses, the image of Matt disappears. Later, medical personnel are shown trying to revive Matt's body.

Peter has been using his new ability to stabilize critical patients he has been rescuing, but finds the process extremely taxing on him. Emma Coolidge helps stitch up a wound on a patient; when Peter asks where she learned how to do that, Emma reveals she had gone to medical school, but dropped out. Later, Emma helps revive a collapsed girl. Peter asks Emma why she dropped out, and she reveals that her nephew had drowned while she was momentarily distracted. Peter suggests she go back to school, after passing on thanks from the little girl. Later, Emma is shown pulling out her old lab coat from her closet. At Peter's apartment, Peter has begun taking down his wall of newspaper clippings chronicling his paramedic heroism, when he is interrupted by a knock on the door. Peter is surprised to see it is Nathan, who tells him he may be in trouble.

== Critical reception ==
Steve Heisler of The A.V. Club rated this episode a D+.

Robert Canning of IGN gave the episode 7.0 out of 10.
