= The Art of Deception (Heroes) =

- Heroes episode
- Noah takes aim as he prepares to shoot down Samuel.
- Episode no.: Season 4 Episode 17
- Directed by: S. J. Clarkson
- Written by: Mark Verheiden; Misha Green
- Production code: 417
- Original air date: January 25, 2010

Guest appearances
- Madeline Zima as Gretchen Berg; Dawn Olivieri as Lydia; Ray Park as Edgar; Deanne Bray as Emma Coolidge; Todd Stashwick as Eli; Lisa Lackey as Janice Parkman; Elisabeth Röhm as Lauren Gilmore; David H. Lawrence XVII as Eric Doyle; Harry Perry as Damien; Daryl Crittenden as Chris Bowman; Erin O'Reilly as Gale Bowman; Kaleigh Ryan as Jennie Bowman

Episode chronology
← Previous "Pass/Fail"	Next → "The Wall"
- Heroes season 4

"The Art of Deception" is the seventeenth episode of the fourth season of the NBC superhero drama series Heroes, and the seventy-fifth episode overall. The episode aired on January 25, 2010.

== Plot ==
Peter Petrelli continues having dreams of Emma Coolidge at the carnival, and subsequently being saved by Sylar. Peter meets with Angela Petrelli to help her come to terms with Nathan Petrelli's death, then asks Angela where Sylar is. He manages to acquire Sylar's location. Meanwhile, Matt Parkman is stunned to see Sylar at his home, who has created the ruse that he and Matt used to work together as cops to fool Janice. Matt is able to privately talk with Sylar, who reveals he wants Matt to suppress his powers. Matt's initial attempt fails, causing Sylar to lash out and hold Janice with his telekinesis. Sylar explains his powers are making him insane, and lets Janice go. Janice realizes the man is Sylar and tells Matt he must bury him for good. Matt agrees, and manages to trap Sylar in his own nightmare: a world where no one exists, so that he will be alone forever. Matt takes the knocked out Sylar and begins building a brick wall around him in the basement, but is interrupted by the arrival of Peter. Borrowing Matt's ability, Peter explains he needs Sylar. Matt warns Peter of Sylar's state and that if Peter tries waking him, he may become trapped too. Peter enters Sylar's mind, and finds himself in a world devoid of anybody.

After her encounter with Sylar, Claire Bennet visits Noah Bennet's apartment to speak to him about it, but instead finds Lauren. After entering, Claire notices the maps and realizes that Noah is planning to attack the carnival. Lauren tries to convince Claire to wait for Noah, but Claire decides to leave for the carnival. Meanwhile, Samuel Sullivan discovers his family's trust in him has shaken due to his demolishing of the town. Claire visits Lydia, revealing Noah's plan to take out Samuel, and that Samuel must turn himself in. They explain the situation to Samuel, who finally agrees. Claire calls Noah, who is watching Samuel through a sniper scope, and explains that Samuel will go with him peacefully. Noah agrees, and has Lauren head down to take Samuel in. Samuel addresses the carnival, telling them his decision to leave with Claire, but is interrupted by sniper fire to his shoulder. Shots continue to be fired, with many people injured, including Lydia, Claire, who quickly heals, and Lauren. Noah looks around and spots Eli firing with his own sniper rifle. Noah takes him out with his sniper, but realizes it was just a copy as the real Eli knocks him out.

Samuel finds Lydia, who is mortally wounded, and kisses her. In her dying breaths, Lydia uses her powers on Samuel, and is horrified to see Samuel had planned this, who explains he needed to create a villain and have Lydia sacrificed. Eli brings Noah down for everyone to see, and the carnival quickly puts the blame on him and Claire. Noah manages to tell Claire he didn't fire, but Samuel has Noah locked up in the house of mirrors and Claire in his trailer. Emma Coolidge later arrives, who Samuel is pleased to see. Lauren, having spotted Eli carrying Noah down to the carnival, places a call to Tracy Strauss. Edgar arrives to see Lydia's body, shocked to see her dead. Samuel then addresses the whole carnival, telling them it's time to show the world who they really are.

== Critical reception ==
Josh Modell of The A.V. Club rated this episode a D−.

Robert Canning of IGN gave the episode 7.7 out of 10.
