= Homecoming (Heroes) =

- Heroes episode
- Episode no.: Season 1 Episode 9
- Directed by: Greg Beeman
- Written by: Adam Armus; Kay Foster
- Cinematography by: Nate Goodman
- Editing by: Scott Boyd
- Original release date: November 20, 2006
- Running time: 43 minutes

Guest appearances
- Danielle Savre as Jackie Wilcox; Matt Lanter as Brody; Zachary Quinto as Sylar; James Kyson as Ando Masahashi; Thomas Dekker as Zach; Jimmy Jean-Louis as The Haitian

Episode chronology
← Previous "Seven Minutes to Midnight"	Next → "Six Months Ago"
- Heroes season 1

"Homecoming" is the ninth episode of the first season of the American superhero drama television series Heroes. The episode was written by supervising producers Adam Armus and Kay Foster, and directed by co-executive producer Greg Beeman. It originally aired on NBC on November 20, 2006.

The series tells the stories of ordinary people who discover that they have superhuman abilities and how these abilities take effect in the characters' lives as they work together to prevent catastrophic futures. In the episode, Peter leaves to "save the cheerleader", while Mr. Bennet tries to protect Claire from Sylar.

According to Nielsen Media Research, the episode was seen by an estimated 16.03 million household viewers and gained a 5.7 ratings share among adults aged 18–49, making it the most watched episode of the series by then. It received highly positive reviews from critics, who praised the performances, storylines and tension.

== Plot ==
The episode begins with Claire and her friend Zach walking into the high school amphitheater with lunch as Claire's former cheerleader friends wait anxiously for the results of the Homecoming Court vote.

Claire downplays the entire ritual, but Zach encourages her to check the posting and see if she had won. To Claire's surprise, she has been voted Homecoming Queen, with her main rival, Jackie, merely a member of the court.

Astonished, Claire and the rest of the cheerleaders turn around to see much of the student body proclaiming congratulations and support for Claire. She later discovers that Zach had been campaigning for her, working to win the "unpopular vote" by letting everyone know that Claire is not like the popular Jackie. Jackie, however, spoils the moment in an attempt to deflate Claire's victory by poking fun at Zach. Claire, beginning to see the importance of Zach's friendship to her, promptly punches Jackie in the face.

D.L. and Micah have stopped at a local diner as they flee from Las Vegas. Micah compares them to Batman and Robin, though D.L. jokes that he refuses to wear tights. A police car pulls into the lot as D.L. leaves the car to get a paper, and he becomes nervous, lowering his cap and turning to return to the vehicle when he sees that Micah is gone.

Elsewhere, Jessica is testing a long-range Army sniper rifle at a firing range. She stresses the need for range on the gun. The seller replies that the rifle was known to pierce body armour at 400 yards (365 meters). As they walk back to the car, Jessica tells him that she is trying to kill "a man" (D.L) who had stolen "her" son. The seller says that she must really hate him. A glance in the car mirror shows a nervous Niki, but Jessica only smiles, stating that it's time to go hunting.

Ando is still in the Burnt Toast Diner, waiting uncertainly for Hiro. Suddenly he sees, pinned to a board, a photo with Charlie and Hiro together, smiling. Ando asks another lady when the photo was taken. She replies, "On Charlie's birthday. About six months ago."

Meanwhile, Mohinder remains in India, puzzling over the dreams he recently had and the identity of the boy within them. He seeks the child, paying 500 rupees to a man who tells him that the boy is playing near Mohinder. Mohinder asks him about his dream. The mysterious boy states that he does not come to people, but they instead to him. He tells Mohinder that he already has the answers. Later that night, Mohinder has more dreams and realizes that his father was only trying to protect him when shunning his son from continuing his research. Mohinder decides to continue his father's work. He discovers the password to the computer. After trying the name Darwin, he tries Shanti, his dead sister, and is rewarded with a list of heroes Chandra Suresh identified before his death.

Nathan Petrelli obtains Isaac's painting from Mr. Linderman and views it with Simone. To protect Peter from the painting's predicted events, Nathan splashes the work with black paint and leaves. Peter arrives later and sees the ruined work, but Simone reveals a digital photograph of the painting, which shows a man, whom they presume to be Peter, lying on the cement outside a school, a pool of blood forming around his head. Simone tells him where the school is located and to be safe.

Peter calls Ando to tell Hiro that he must get to Odessa, Texas, where Claire lives, and Ando promises to tell Hiro (who unfortunately jumped to Charlie's birthday, six months in the past while trying to save her from Sylar).

Isaac himself is still in the care of Eden and Mr. Bennet, but his latest work of the future gives no answers to Mr. Bennet. Eden protests the abuse of Isaac and his talents, but Mr. Bennet is adamant that he will do everything to protect Claire from Sylar. Eden is finally persuaded to make Isaac paint, by seeing the photos of Charlie the waitress (head torn open and brain removed).

Peter finally arrives in Texas and discovers that Hiro is in the past and unable to help him. Ando protests that Peter must not go, after learning that he is essentially powerless without the presence of another hero. Peter, however, rejects staying behind and leaves the diner for an uncertain fate as Ando waits for Hiro.

Zach enters Claire's bedroom via a ladder because her father grounded her from attending the homecoming game for fear Sylar will kill her. The two have a heart-to-heart about their friendship and embracing their "inner freak." Claire realizes that she hasn't been the best friend to Zach but vows to make it up to him as he urges her to be comfortable with who she is. Zach convinces her to sneak out and attend the homecoming game.

As Claire makes her way to the locker room in the school to change, she talks briefly in the hallway with Peter, who had just seen a display commemorating Jackie's heroics and doesn't realize that Claire is actually the cheerleader he is meant to save.

In the locker room, Claire confronts Jackie about her false act of heroism in saving the people in the burning train. Suddenly, the lights in the locker room flicker and Sylar grabs Jackie from behind, believing her to be the cheerleader he is after. Claire arrives to see this (as shown in the image above) and tries to stop Sylar but is telekinetically thrown against the wall. As she is regenerating, Sylar lifts a finger, making a line across Jackie's forehead as an incision appears, and as blood begins pouring down Jackie's face she screams in pain.

Claire rises badly hurt but then regenerates and Sylar sees that his initial target was incorrect. Before Jackie dies, she softly tells Claire to run as Sylar throws Jackie's dead body to the ground.

Peter and Mr. Bennet have heard the girls' screams and run to assist Claire; Peter arrives first in the hallway. He attempts to hold Sylar off; however, the serial killer uses his telekinetic powers to rip off locker doors and hurls them at Peter (similar to a painting of Isaac's). Peter then retreats to the amphitheater as Claire flees the growing shadow, a scene reminiscent of another one of Isaac's paintings. Peter orders Claire to get help as he faces Sylar himself. The serial killer appears in front of Peter, the two grapple, and both fall to the ground below as a pool of blood forms around Peter's head, just as Isaac's painting depicted.

Claire finds Peter, who begins to heal himself due to Claire's presence. Sylar is nowhere to be found, but Claire finds comfort in finding someone with powers like her. She soon finds her father, who takes her home as she begins to confess her powers.

Meanwhile, Sylar runs through the woods and is confronted by Eden and the Haitian. She first tells him, "You don't want to hurt me." He stops, and then Eden tells him to go to sleep.

Peter is found by the police, soaked with blood and lying on the ground. He is arrested for Jackie's murder.

The final minutes of the episode show Micah and D.L. deciding to go back to Las Vegas to help Niki/Jessica, as Jessica takes aim at D.L. and fires a shot. Before the outcome is seen, the shows jumps back six months to show Hiro arriving at the diner, informing Charlie that he has arrived to save her life.

== Production ==
=== Development ===
In November 2006, NBC announced that the ninth episode of the season would be titled "Homecoming". The episode was written by supervising producers Adam Armus and Kay Foster, and directed by co-executive producer Greg Beeman. This was Armus' first writing credit, Foster's first writing credit, and Beeman's third directing credit.

== Reception ==
=== Viewers ===
In its original American broadcast, "Homecoming" was seen by an estimated 16.03 million household viewers with a 5.7 in the 18–49 demographics. This means that 5.7 percent of all households with televisions watched the episode. It finished 8th out of 89 programs airing from November 20–26, 2006. This was a 6% increase in viewership from the previous episode, which was watched by an estimated 15.08 million household viewers with a 5.3 in the 18–49 demographics.

=== Critical reviews ===
"Homecoming" received highly positive reviews from critics. Robert Canning of IGN gave the episode a "great" 8 out of 10 and wrote, "Four episodes ago, Hiro Nakamura traveled from the future to deliver a message to Peter Petrelli: "Save the cheerleader, save the world." The phrase became Heroes' calling card. NBC used it ad nauseam in commercials for the show, with this episode in particular getting the sort of promotional attention saved for a season finale. So with the moment finally here, could the battle to save the cheerleader live up to all this hype? Does anything ever live up to the hype? Though there could have been a bit more bang in the final confrontation, there was still plenty of cause to cheer."

Alan Sepinwall wrote, "I've written before that, on their respective best days, Heroes isn't remotely in the same class as Lost, but that what the new show has on the old one is a willingness to continually move the plot forward, answer questions and, above all else, avoid pissing off the audience." Angel Cohn of TV Guide wrote, "As much as I was getting annoyed by the now-deceased Jackie, I almost kind of feel bad for her having to suffer that fate. But seriously, shunning Claire because she befriended some of the less popular crowd and took down the school's date rapist is hardly a reason to have her killed off. I really thought for a minute that Jackie was the cheerleader who had to be saved and that she had some special power. That would have been an interesting twist."

Michael Canfield of TV Squad wrote, "I thought the episode rocked. After last week, which was underwhelming, I'm relieved. I didn't even mind the Mohinder scenes this time, which were kept to a minimum, and at least gave us our first really substantial glimpses of the elder Prof. Suresh." Television Without Pity gave the episode an "A" grade.
