= Simone Deveaux =

Fictional character from the television series Heroes

- Heroes character
- First appearance: "Genesis"; September 25, 2006
- Last appearance: "Parasite"; March 4, 2007
- Created by: Tim Kring
- Portrayed by: Tawny Cypress

In-universe information
- Occupation: Art dealer
- Family: Charles Deveaux (father)

Simone Deveaux is a fictional character in the TV series Heroes, portrayed by Tawny Cypress.

== Character's background ==
=== Genesis ===
When Simone Deveaux is introduced in the premiere episode, she is an art dealer living in New York City who is romantically involved with artist Isaac Mendez. However, she becomes increasingly distressed with Isaac's heroin addiction and his claims that he can paint the future.

In the episode "One Giant Leap", Simone takes down a painting of Claire and Zach and tells Isaac that she is selling the paintings so that he can go to rehab. When Isaac refuses, she leaves him. Later that day, Peter Petrelli, who until recently had been a hospice nurse caring for Simone's father, confesses his love for her. Although the two spend the night together, Simone doesn't want to rush into a new relationship.

Several days later, Simone tells Peter that her father has died. When Peter inquires about the painting by Isaac which she sold recently, Simone tells him Mr. Linderman bought it.

After Peter's brother Nathan retrieves the painting, he and Simone view it together. Nathan destroys the painting, which angers Simone. However, she is able to show Peter a digital replica and the image depicted seems to be a dead man resembling Peter. Nevertheless, Peter decides to go to the Union Wells high school homecoming shown in the picture. Simone is gradually starting to believe that Isaac can paint the future, and hopes Peter will come back alive.

In the episode "Fallout", Peter has a vision in which he sees all of the series' main characters in New York, seemingly running away from him. Among them is Simone, who runs towards him, only to be stopped by Isaac and dragged away.

Two weeks later, in "Godsend", Simone visits Peter, who has been comatose for the whole time, in the hospital. She later returns with Nathan to Isaac's loft, where she is greeted by a reformed Isaac. He states that he was in a clinic and can now paint without using heroin, and tells Simone he still loves her. Suddenly, Isaac's new friends Hiro Nakamura and Ando Masahashi arrive. After introductions, Hiro mentions that the Linderman Group has a sword he wants. Simone states that Linderman is an avid art collector, and recommends Hiro take a painting with him to see Linderman in Las Vegas.

During the events of "Distractions", Simone goes to Isaac for help in locating Peter Petrelli. After the two talk, Isaac tells her to keep the key to his apartment. Later, in the same episode, Simone meets with Isaac on the roof of her departed father's building and they discuss the future before going to dinner together.

In the episode "Unexpected", Simone visits Isaac, but the painter tells her that he thinks Peter might have left New York (though he is in fact aware that he is still somewhere in the city). She doesn't believe him, and thinks that he is trying to drive a wedge into her and Peter's relationship out of jealousy. Isaac reasons that he is trying to protect her from Peter, for he is too dangerous. Simone then attempts to give Isaac his key back, but again he refuses, and says that he will do anything for her. Simone only wants for him to find Peter.

Later, Simone confronts Nathan, telling him to reveal Peter's condition as well as the powers of others, in order to get help. However, Nathan refuses, afraid of being considered a freak and taken in for testing and probably lose the elections. Seeing Nathan is not going to budge, Simone leaves, remarking that she's "voting for the other guy". Nathan warns her not to say anything, but she doesn't respond.

Simone returns to the apartment again, but she is accidentally shot in the chest by Isaac, who had been trying to shoot down the invisible Peter. Peter then reappears and she collapses in his arms. As she dies, her hand opens up to reveal Isaac's key.

In "Parasite", Candice Wilmer uses her illusion ability to transform into Simone and taunt Isaac.

In the first season's finale, "How to Stop an Exploding Man", Simone returns in a flashback role. After Peter blacks out in an empty street, he has a dream of the past, awakening on the Deveaux building's rooftop. Peter witnesses a past conversation he had with Simone, and another between Charles Deveaux and his mother. It is revealed that not only do Mrs. Petrelli and Mr. Deveaux know about the main characters' powers, but also about the bomb.

=== Brave New World ===
In the graphic novel From the Files of Primatech: 1991, Dr. Jonas Zimmerman brings Simone along with Barbara (Niki and Tracy's triplet) to her father Charles at the Primatech headquarters. Simone then leaves with Charles and Barbara.

== Production ==
Isaac's love interest was written as a bohemian white woman named Stella. However, after Ali Larter, not Cypress, was awarded the role of Niki Sanders, Heroes creator Tim Kring offered the role of Stella to her. The character was changed from a bohemian to an art dealer, and the name was changed to Simone Deveaux. The writers had discussed several storyline possibilities for Simone such as pregnancy and becoming another "Horn Rimmed Glasses" (Noah Bennet). Cypress believed Simone to be "the Lois Lane of the Heroes world." In the end, however, the creative staff could not decide what direction to take Simone. Heroes creator Tim Kring informed her of Simone's fate in December 2006.

It feels appropriate to die at the hands of my two suitors, (...) All of the deaths on Heroes so far have been very ugly and graphic, and this one was more [like] a beautiful fade-away.

— Tawny Cypress
