= Brave New World (Heroes) =

- Heroes episode
- Samuel addressing the audience gathered in Central Park as he prepares to use his powers to bury the crowd.
- Episode no.: Season 4 Episode 19
- Directed by: Adam Kane
- Written by: Tim Kring
- Production code: 419
- Original air date: February 8, 2010

Guest appearances
- Deanne Bray as Emma Coolidge; David H. Lawrence XVII as Eric Doyle; Ray Park as Edgar; Elisabeth Röhm as Lauren Gilmore; Todd Stashwick as Eli; Adam Lazzare-White as Ian Michaels; K Callan as Charlie Andrews; Harry Perry III as Damien; Daryl Crittenden as Chris Bowman; Erin O'Reilly as Gale Bowman; Kaleigh Ryan as Jennie Bowman

Episode chronology
← Previous "The Wall"	Next → —
- Heroes season 4

"Brave New World" is the nineteenth and final episode of the fourth season of the NBC superhero drama series Heroes, and the seventy-seventh and final episode overall. With the show's cancellation three months later, this episode serves as the de facto series finale, although the Heroes world would return in the miniseries Heroes Reborn five years later. The episode aired on February 8, 2010. It marked the end of the Redemption volume, as well as the series as the show was cancelled on May 14, 2010 by NBC. It ended with a brief introduction to what would have become the next volume, also entitled Brave New World.

== Plot ==
Claire Bennet and her father Noah realize that their attempts to dig out of the trailer Samuel Sullivan has trapped them in will only use up their limited air supply quicker. Noah accepts his death as inevitable, telling Claire that Samuel has trapped them there so she can watch him die (Claire cannot suffocate as her lungs will continue to regenerate). Claire, however, is unable to accept her father's death, even as he tells her his dying wish is for her to hide herself as a normal human after Samuel exposes his powers to the world. As Noah begins to run out of breath, Tracy Strauss arrives through a water channel in the dirt surrounding the trailer and is able to bring both Claire and Noah back to the surface alive, where they meet up with Lauren Gilmore. Lauren has called a helicopter to take the three of them to Central Park, where Samuel and his carnival are setting up for "the greatest show on earth," while Tracy has disappeared for unknown reasons.

Meanwhile, at Matt Parkman's house, Sylar and Peter, now freed from the nightmare in Sylar's mind, stop Eli from killing Matt by knocking the original Eli out. Peter reads Eli's mind and learns of Samuel's devastating plans. Matt refuses to let Sylar go with Peter, even after Sylar asks him to look inside his mind and decide for himself whether or not Sylar's intentions are noble. Although Matt still does not fully trust Sylar's mind, he grudgingly gives him a chance to prove himself on Peter's plea to trust them. As the two leave, Matt approaches the unconscious Eli and instructs him to return to the carnival.

In Central Park, as the carnival sets up, Emma Coolidge confronts Samuel, who confirms Peter's dream is true. As Emma refuses to comply, Doyle emerges from Samuel's trailer and puppets her into playing, which quickly attracts a large crowd as well as media attention. Peter and Sylar arrive and split up; Peter looks for Samuel as Sylar goes to save Emma. Upon finding her, he too is controlled by Doyle until Emma, noticing a momentary gap in attention, blasts Doyle with her synesthetic sound manipulation ability. Sylar telekinetically pins Doyle to the ground as he begs for mercy, telling Sylar that he is not a good guy. Sylar responds defiantly that, "I'm a hero." He is later shown to have tied up Doyle with a string of lights rather than simply kill him, another sign to prove his change into a new person.

At the hospital, Hiro Nakamura awakens from his hallucination and tells Ando that he is fully healed. As they prepare to leave, a nurse gives Hiro a note from a woman in another hospital room. The note reads, "Is it really you?" and is accompanied by a small origami swan. Hiro rushes to the room to find Charlie Andrews on the bed, now an 85-year-old woman. Hiro is shocked as she explains that at the Burnt Toast Diner, Arnold took her back to Milwaukee on January 26, 1944, where she lived her life, getting a job in a war factory. Hiro, after talking with Ando, explains that he can "fix this" by time-traveling to 1944 and bringing her back so they can live a life together. Charlie admits the idea is tempting, but explains that she has lived a life, marrying and having four children and seven grandchildren, one of whom Hiro meets, named Sally. Hiro realizes he cannot take this life away from Charlie for his own personal happiness just as Ando receives an urgent call for help from Noah. Hiro transports himself and Ando to the carnival after saying a final goodbye to Charlie.

Meanwhile, Noah and Claire have also shown up and split ways; Claire to convince the carnival specials to leave, and Noah to find Samuel. However, Noah is quickly captured at knifepoint by Edgar, who pulls him aside and reveals that he also wants to stop Samuel. Claire finds Samuel's people and attempts to convince them of Samuel's evil intentions, telling them of Samuel's ability to grow stronger with more superhumans around him. No one listens to her until she reveals that Samuel killed his brother Joseph. The crowd finally believes her when Noah arrives with Edgar, who backs up Claire's claim, explaining that Lydia told him everything before she was killed. Eli also arrives, having been brainwashed by Matt Parkman, and tells everyone how Samuel had him kill Lydia. As everyone leaves Samuel, he attempts to get them back, but eventually screams, "Run as fast as you can! You'll never get far enough!" Afterward, he goes out to address the large crowd, and begins to use his powers to shake the earth. However, Peter flies into him, taking his ability, and they enter into a battle in Samuel's tent in which they're both equally matched. Hiro and Ando arrive and Hiro, after being supercharged by Ando, transports all the carnival superhumans away from Central Park, rendering Samuel powerless and allowing Peter to defeat him in hand-to-hand combat. Peter throws Samuel on stage and he collapses on the ground, hopeless and alone. Noah remarks to Peter, "I gotta say, I never liked carnivals" which Peter agrees with.

=== Volume Six: Brave New World ===
As Samuel is taken away by the reformed Company, Lauren speaks with the press, feeding them a cover story to hide the truth of what went on there that night. As the press turn to question Claire and Noah, Claire gets them to follow her as she climbs to the top of the Ferris wheel. Sylar notes to Peter that while he wanted to kill Doyle, he choose not to and saving Emma felt good. As they notice Claire climbing, Peter states that she will change everything and Sylar declares, "It's a brave new world." Claire leaps off of the Ferris wheel with the press watching. With the cameras in her face, she relocates her arm and the cut on her face heals. She says, "My name is Claire Bennet, and this is attempt number...I guess I've kinda lost count."

== Critical reception ==
"Brave New World" received mixed to positive reviews. Steve Heisler of The A.V. Club rated this episode an F. Robert Canning of IGN gave the episode 8.0 out of 10.
