= Misha Green =

American screenwriter, director, and producer

- Born: September 22, 1984 (age 42); Sacramento, California
- Occupations: Screenwriter, director, producer
- Television: Lovecraft Country; Underground

Misha Green (born September 22, 1984, in Sacramento, California) is an American screenwriter, director, and producer. She is best known as the showrunner of the supernatural series Lovecraft Country on HBO and creator and executive producer of the historical drama Underground.

== Career ==
Green has previously been a staff writer for Heroes and Sons of Anarchy and a producer for Helix.

In 2016, together with fellow Heroes alumnus Joe Pokaski, Green created Underground, a period drama about the Underground Railroad, which takes place primarily in the Antebellum South and bordering free states of the North. The first season premiered on WGN America on March 9, 2016, and the show received a positive critical response. On April 25, 2016, the network renewed Underground for a second season, which premiered on March 8, 2017.

In 2020, Green wrote a supernatural horror show, Lovecraft Country, which was produced by Get Out director and writer Jordan Peele. Based on Matt Ruff's novel of the same name, the series tackles race issues, set in the 1950s, while also utilizing elements of H. P. Lovecraft. The show received a "straight-to-series" order from HBO. The series co-stars Underground star Jurnee Smollett-Bell. On July 2, 2021, HBO announced that the series would not be returning for a second season. In James Andrew Miller's book Tinderbox: HBO's Ruthless Pursuit of New Frontiers, several writers of the show claimed it was cancelled due to Green's alleged creation of a toxic work environment.

In January 2021, she was chosen by MGM to write and direct the sequel to 2018's Tomb Raider, a franchise she has described herself as a fan of since its first entries on PlayStation. Green confirmed via her official Twitter account in May 2021 that the first draft of the script, with the working title Tomb Raider: Obsidian, had been completed. In July 2021 Alicia Vikander told Collider that the sequel is still happening but had not been greenlit yet. In September 2021 Green responded to a fan question about the status of the film, and indicated that she was still set to direct her own script. In July 2022, it was reported that MGM had lost the film rights to the Tomb Raider franchise, after the window ran out to give the sequel the green light, culminating in Vikander's departure from the lead role. The rights reverted to the game company and prompted a bidding war among studios.

In April 2021, Green was announced as producer for the upcoming film, Cleopatra Jones. She also wrote and produced the Netflix film The Mother, and was originally set to write a DC Comics Black Canary film for Warner Bros.

In July 2021, Green signed a multi-year overall deal to create and develop television projects for Apple TV+.

In January 2023, she was announced to make her directorial debut with Sunflower, a Lionsgate film. The script was the first she sold after arriving in Hollywood, and was eventually featured on the 2008 Black List of favorite unproduced screenplays.

== Filmography ==
Film

Year	Title	Writer	Producer
2023	The Mother	Yes	Yes

Television

Year	Title	Director	Writer	Producer	Notes
2009	Sons of Anarchy	No	Yes	No	Episode: "Potlatch" (also staff writer)
2009–2010	Heroes	No	Yes	No	Episodes: "Shadowboxing" and "The Art of Deception"
2011	Spartacus: Gods of the Arena	No	Yes	No	Episode: "Beneath the Mask" (also story editor)
2012	Spartacus	No	Yes	No	Episode: "Chosen Path" (also story editor)
2014	Helix	No	Yes	No	3 episodes
2016–2017	Underground	No	Yes	Yes	18 episodes; Also co-creator
2020	Lovecraft Country	Yes	Yes	Executive	Developer and showrunner Director: "Jig-a-Bobo"

== Awards and nominations ==
Year	Award	Category	Work	Result
2017	Black Reel Awards	Outstanding Drama Series	Underground	Nominated
2020	Bram Stoker Awards	Best Screenplay	Lovecraft Country (for "Sundown")	Nominated
2020	Bram Stoker Awards	Best Screenplay	Lovecraft Country (for "Jig-a-Bobo")	Nominated
2021	Primetime Emmy Awards	Outstanding Writing for a Drama Series	Lovecraft Country (for "Sundown")	Nominated
2021	Black Reel Awards	Outstanding Drama Series	Lovecraft Country	Nominated
2021	Black Reel Awards	Outstanding Directing, Drama Series	Lovecraft Country	Nominated
2021	Black Reel Awards	Outstanding Writing, Drama Series	Lovecraft Country	Nominated
2021	NAACP Image Awards	Outstanding Directing in a Drama Series	Lovecraft Country (for "Jig-a-Bobo")	Nominated
2021	International Online Cinema Awards	Best Writing for a Drama Series	Lovecraft Country (for "Meet Me in Daegu")	Nominated
2021	Nebula Awards	Ray Bradbury Award for Outstanding Dramatic Presentation	Lovecraft Country	Nominated
2021	Writers Guild of America Awards	New Series	Lovecraft Country	Nominated
