= Deirdre Quinn =

American actress

- Born: September 16, 1973 (age 52)
- Occupation: Television actress
- Years active: 1996–2008
- Spouse: Brett Karns (2004–present)
- Children: 1

Deirdre Quinn (born September 16, 1973) is a former American model and actress, known for her role as Miss Texas in the 2000 film Miss Congeniality.

== Early life and education ==
Quinn grew up outside Philadelphia and is a graduate of Germantown Academy. At the age of 12, she was discovered by a photographer at a bat mitzvah, and soon was signed to Wilhelmina Models, appearing in many campaigns, including a commercial for Irish Spring. Quinn is a graduate in theatre from the University of Lynchburg and New York University.

== Career ==
Quinn is known for her roles as Miss Texas, Sandra Bullock's roommate in the mega comedy hit, Miss Congeniality, "Texas" Tina in the television series Heroes, and roles in films such as Aces 'N' Eights, The Last Dance, The Diary of Ellen Rimbauer, and appearances in CSI: Crime Scene Investigation, CSI: NY and K-Ville.

== Personal life ==
Quinn married Brett Karns on April 4, 2004. Their wedding was featured in the summer 2005 edition of American bridal magazine Inside Weddings. Since the birth of her daughter, Quinn has retired from acting and modelling.

== Filmography ==
=== Film ===
| Year | Title | Role | Notes |
|---|---|---|---|
| 2000 | Miss Congeniality | Mary Jo 'Texas' | |
| 2002 | New Suit | Big Agency Receptionist | |
| 2002 | Lying for a Living | —N/a | Documentary |

=== Television ===
| Year | Title | Role | Notes |
|---|---|---|---|
| 1996 | The City | Natasha | Episode dated 26 September 1996 |
| 1997 | Apartment 2F | Hot Video Girl | Episode: "Ass Clock" |
| 2000 | Diagnosis: Murder | Teri Deegan | Episode: "Sleight-of-Hand" |
| 2000 | The Last Dance | Young Helen Parker | Television film |
| 2000 | CSI: Crime Scene Investigation | Shannon the Flight Attendant | Episode: "Unfriendly Skies" |
| 2003 | The Diary of Ellen Rimbauer | Fanny | Television film |
| 2005 | E-Ring | Sharon Starkey | Episode: "The Forgotten" |
| 2006 | CSI: NY | Elle Jeffries | Episode: "Stealing Home" |
| 2006 | Heroes | Tina | 7 episodes |
| 2007 | K-Ville | Sarah Napier | Episode: "Pilot" |
| 2008 | Aces 'N' Eights | Jo Tanner | Television film |
