= Sylar =

Fictional character

- Heroes character
- First appearance: "One Giant Leap"; October 9, 2006
- Last appearance: "Brave New World"; February 8, 2010
- Created by: Tim Kring
- Portrayed by: Zachary Quinto; Joshua Rush (young); Ian Quinn ("One Giant Leap")
- Voiced by: Maurice LaMarche ("Don't Look Back")

In-universe information
- Full name: Gabriel Gray
- Occupation: Watchmaker
- Ability: Intuitive aptitude

Sylar (Gabriel Gray) is a fictional character and a primary antagonist of the NBC superhero drama series Heroes. Portrayed by Zachary Quinto, he is a super-powered serial killer who targets other superhumans in order to steal their powers. He served as the primary villain of the first season and then as a recurring antagonist. Over the course of the series, the writers depicted Sylar attempting at various times and under different circumstances to become a hero or curb his desire to kill, undergoing relapses at various stages. In the series' penultimate episode, he experienced over three years of penitence in a mental prison, and later identifies himself as a hero in the series finale.

TV Guide included him in their 2013 list of "The 60 Nastiest Villains of All Time".

== Concept and creation ==
Sylar was created as a cannibal who ate his victims' brains and "digested their power"; in order to avoid the potential silliness and zombie associations, the producers deliberately made this fact vague in the series. In an interview with series creator Tim Kring, it is asked if Sylar eats brains, and he merely states "That's the popular speculation. There's a connection between the powers and the brain, and Sylar has found it." The question is addressed in the season three premiere, when he is depicted in the act of acquiring Claire Bennet's regenerative powers through examination of her brain with his hands. When Claire asks him the same question, he sounds surprised and replies "Eat your brain? Claire, that's disgusting." The writers never bridged the gap between the early insinuations regarding what Sylar does with the brains and the final incarnation they reveal in his encounter with Claire.

Prior to Quinto's first appearance in the episode "Seven Minutes to Midnight", the role of Sylar was played by stunt doubles, and usually, as in "One Giant Leap", the character's face being obscured by shadows. Quinto himself played the role with his face hidden in the same way until "Six Months Ago". In the second episode of the first season, "Don't Look Back", his voice is heard in a recorded phone conversation on Chandra Suresh's answering machine, spoken by voice actor Maurice LaMarche. Part of this conversation is heard again in "Six Months Ago", this time spoken by Quinto.

== Personality ==
Sylar was raised as the son of a watchmaker, but was indoctrinated by his mother's repeated assertions to believe that he was special and deserved more in life. This and the "evolutionary imperative" to acquire new abilities are what drive him to kill the victims with powers. Taking the name "Sylar" from a watch brand, he has shed all connections to his former life as Gabriel Gray to the point where he angrily lashes out at anyone who calls him Gabriel.

In addition to the above, Sylar shows a marked lack of empathy. As seen in the episode ".07%", when shortly before killing Isaac Mendez, he casually comments on Mendez's lack of fear, with the sort of mild surprise that someone might express if he noticed that a train was running late.

Although he at times tries to impersonate other people in order to obtain a longer-term goal, Sylar is also unable to completely control his "hunger," or obsessive tendencies, to the extent that he still intimidates people when he is trying to gain their trust or co-operation. This was seen with Mohinder Suresh, when Sylar tried to impersonate Zane Taylor, and also with Claire Bennet's mother when Sylar was looking for Claire, as well.

Sylar's dominant trait was his innate desire to be recognized as special and admired. This was fueled by his mother's vocal disappointment in him for perceived failure and his own feelings that he did not get a chance to choose his destiny, being forced into the role of a watchmaker. He spent his life hoping to learn something extraordinary about himself.

Sylar is repeatedly shown as desperately looking for a family and parental figures due to his own unhappy home life, desperately wanting to be loved. The flip side of this is that he can react with extreme violence when his emotional needs are exploited by others.

Sylar is also known for his voracious appetite, and he can constantly be seen snacking or looking for food. He has even taken time during his murders to eat, such as when he reacted with joy at a birthday cake of the woman he just killed.

Quinto has said of his character,

The sad part is, he's initially well-intentioned. He wants to improve his life. He wants to make a difference. He wants to matter. Through the process of realizing how to do that, he gets blinded and loses himself in the pursuit of it and goes a little crazy—'a little' being an understatement.

Quinto also observed,

He's definitely somebody that has been overcome by a hunger and overcome by a pursuit for power and for importance that did start a little more innocuously than it evolved into.

When asked if he thought Sylar was irredeemable or not, Quinto responded,

I think there's a certain point at which you cross a line and it's sort of irrevocable.... I don't know what the writers have in mind, but it would probably be kind of a challenge at this point, you know?

Quinto has also responded to the question of whether Sylar could ever be good, commenting that

I don't really look at him as, you know, absolutely good or bad. I think that he is constantly walking a line of ambiguity within himself and uncertainty within himself that defines the way he acts.

Sylar, however, is also shown as very caring and thoughtful, like when he takes care of Angela Petrelli, when Arthur and Angela Petrelli claimed that they are Sylar's parents, which Peter wants to go to Pinehearst, Sylar didn't allow him to go alone because it is dangerous, and right after he murdered Brian Davis, he tries to commit suicide, feeling his guilt for murdering a person.

== Character history ==
=== Genesis ===
The episode "Six Months Ago" reveals that Sylar's real name is Gabriel Gray, a highly talented watchmaker who follows his adoptive father's footsteps. He encounters Chandra Suresh, who tells Gabriel that he may be an evolved human with superhuman powers. Gabriel eagerly submits to testing. After being rejected by Suresh because the test results are indeterminate, Gabriel contacts another person on Suresh's list, Brian Davis. Gabriel discovers that he himself has the power of intuitive aptitude, and murders Davis for his telekinetic powers. After returning to Suresh, he becomes "Patient Zero", and continues to work with Suresh until Suresh realizes that Sylar is murdering the people that they meet and ultimately, Suresh is killed by Gabriel in his own cab precisely at 11:53 p.m.

Sylar is first referenced in the first episode when Mohinder Suresh (Chandra Suresh's son) finds a cassette tape labeled "SYLAR" on both sides in his dead father's New York apartment. His character is next mentioned in the series as a mysterious serial killer sought out by the FBI, whose existence is completely speculative. Appearing as a shadowy figure, he attempts to obtain Molly Walker's power after failing the first time.

In "Once Upon a Time in Texas", Sylar bumps into a future Hiro in front of the Burnt Toast Diner, and sidesteps him before entering. Here, he converses with Charlie, and discovers her power of enhanced memory. Sylar prepares to kill Charlie, but Hiro stops time and locks Sylar in a bus storage container. Later, when seeking Sylar to fix Charlie's aneurysm, Sylar angrily attacks Hiro, demanding to know what Hiro did to him. He attempts to kill Hiro, but Hiro prevents this with his time control. Finally, Hiro makes a deal: to tell Sylar about his future if he saves Charlie. Sylar proceeds to do so, and is miffed that he is told that - although he will become the most powerful person - he will die alone and unloved. Sylar proceeds to attempt to obtain Claire Bennet's regenerative abilities, but is stopped by Peter Petrelli. He is greatly injured and is captured by Eden McCain and the Haitian to be experimented on. After various experiments, Sylar manages to escape, but he is again repelled from an attempt to obtain Claire's power.

Remembering Suresh's list, Sylar makes his way to Zane Taylor, and by posing as the person Zane was expecting, Mohinder Suresh, he kills him and obtains his power. After Mohinder arrives, Sylar poses as Zane, and convinces Mohinder to take him to help convince other people with special abilities that Mohinder's research is real. After Sylar acquires enhanced hearing from a woman named Dale, Mohinder discovers Sylar's identity and manages to incapacitate him with drugs. After experimenting on Sylar to create a new list of people with special powers and attempting to kill him, Mohinder is captured. After Peter shows up and is temporarily killed by Sylar, Mohinder knocks him out, but ends up leaving Isaac Mendez's address on the ground.

After meeting Isaac, and being told that his fate is to die at the hands of the other heroes, he takes Isaac's power to paint the future. He soon finishes a painting depicting himself about to kill and acquire the power of the radioactive Ted Sprague, and believes himself to be the "exploding man". Believing that only those who "don't deserve" their powers are the ones that need to die, he doesn't want to kill innocent people. After attempting to confide in Mohinder, he returns home to his alleged mother, Virginia Gray, in the hope that she will tell him that it is fine not to be special and live as a normal watchmaker. She tells him that he can be anything, including the president, causing him to demonstrate his powers and accidentally injure her. This causes her to panic, which eventually leads to her death, and Sylar deciding that his path is correct.

After acquiring the radioactive powers of Ted, Sylar paints a picture of himself facing off against Peter Petrelli at Kirby Plaza. Realizing Peter is part of his final destiny, Sylar prepares to hunt him down. Before he can leave, Ando Masahashi arrives to kill him, though Ando is easily thwarted. After Sylar discovers the comic depicting his death at the hands of Hiro Nakamura, Hiro appears and rescues Ando. Sylar sets off for Kirby Plaza to wait for Peter. After a struggle involving Sylar, Peter, Matt Parkman, and Niki Sanders, Peter begins the process of exploding, showing Sylar that he is not the exploding man. Soon after, Hiro arrives and impales Sylar through the stomach as the comic predicts, terribly wounding him. His last act is to telekinetically throw Hiro towards a building, forcing him to teleport and rendering him incapable of stopping Peter, as he collapses with a triumphant grin on his face while events that transpired throughout the season that end with his injury by Hiro play in his eyes. However, near the end of the episode, a trail of blood leading from where Sylar collapsed and ending at an open manhole is seen, indicating that Sylar is still alive.

=== Generations ===
Sylar is rescued by Candice Wilmer, who uses her powers of illusion to make Sylar disappear. After undergoing eight surgeries, he eventually awakes and realizes that he cannot use his powers. Though Candice promises that they will come back eventually, he kills her and attempts to acquire her power in order to start over. After realizing that it also doesn't work, he attempts to leave, though he realizes that he is in the middle of a dense jungle in Mexico. After wandering for three days, he is rescued from the brink of death by the passing-by Maya and Alejandro Herrera. He introduces himself using his real name, and eventually finds out that they are in search of Chandra Suresh to help control Maya's power. He tells them that he knows Suresh, and that he will take them to him.

He continues to travel with them, and while Alejandro becomes more distrustful of Sylar, Maya becomes more trusting of him. After teaching Maya to control her powers, he convinces her that her brother hates her and that in her heart she wanted to see his wife dead. Convincing her to send Alejandro away, Sylar is eventually confronted by Alejandro. He kills him, but states that he would have let Alejandro go had he not come back. Soon after, Maya confesses her love for Gabriel, and they reach Mohinder's apartment. Sylar attempts to obtain a cure for his condition, later revealed to be the same strain of the Shanti Virus which Niki was infected with. Upon finding that Sylar cannot use any of his obtained abilities, Mohinder attempts to kill Sylar, who then threatens him with a gun. This causes Maya to finally see Sylar's true intentions, so Sylar takes Maya, Mohinder and Molly hostage. Sylar agrees to go to Isaac's loft after Mohinder tells him tests need to be run. At the loft, Molly reveals to Maya that Alejandro is dead, who then goes to confront Sylar. He rolls his eyes as Maya screams at him, casually turns around and shoots her in the chest, and then tells Mohinder to cure Maya first. Elle enters the building and starts shooting at Sylar, but by then he has seen that the cure works, and he steals it and escapes.

=== Villains ===
In "Villains", Hiro sees Sylar's life shortly after the murder of Brian Davis. Intensely remorseful over the act, Gabriel attempts to hang himself. Elle Bishop walks in and saves him by using her electric abilities to cut the rope, convincing him that he's a good person. However, she is actually working with Noah Bennet to get Sylar to reveal the method behind transferring powers from one person to another. Elle befriends Gabriel and the two begin to share feelings for each other. Against her wishes, Elle helps Noah manipulate him to kill again by introducing Gabriel to Trevor Zeitlan, a young man who can kinetically shatter objects by "shooting" at them with his thumb and forefinger. She purposefully enrages Gabriel by having Trevor repeatedly demonstrate his ability by shattering glasses while calling him "special." Gabriel turns on Elle, who tries to stop him from killing Trevor. When Gabriel realizes Elle also has an ability, he is furious and pushes her against the wall with his mind, commanding her to leave before turning on Trevor and taking his power. Bennet and Elle watch from the car as Gabriel attacks Trevor.

In the third season, Sylar injects himself with the cure, healing his wounds and regaining use of his intuitive aptitude and telekinesis (though none of his other acquired powers). Sylar makes his way to California and finally takes Claire's power, though he does not kill her, claiming that she is special and that he couldn't do so even if he wanted to because he felt something special about her. He also takes several of the Company files on superhumans she had collected.

Sylar breaks into Company headquarters, killing Bob Bishop and acquiring his power. He is captured after attempting to take Elle's power, which results in her involuntarily releasing an electric burst which knocks him unconscious. The discharge also disables the Level 5 security system, allowing a dozen dangerous inmates to escape the complex. Before Sylar can regain consciousness, he is locked up. During his imprisonment, Angela Petrelli claims that she is his mother and attempts to rehabilitate him. She allows him to kill Bridget Bailey, a woman who can see the history of an object by touching it, in order to feed his hunger for power. When Noah Bennet returns to the Company to hunt down the escaped villains, Angela assigns Sylar as his partner, sending the two out to confront the villains and save the trapped Peter Petrelli.

Wanting to prove he is not just a killer, to both himself and Bennet, Sylar saves Bennet from Jesse and Knox, two of the escaped villains. However, his "hunger" reasserts itself and he kills Jesse, allowing Knox to escape in the confusion. Sylar is placed in his cell once more, where he is visited by Peter, who angrily snaps his neck after Sylar reveals that they are brothers. Peter, having absorbed Sylar's power and thereby his hunger, nearly kills Angela before Sylar knocks him unconscious. As Angela deals with her youngest son, Bennet arrives to take Sylar along to capture another Level 5 inmate. Sylar is surprised that Bennet would want to take him, but Bennet rebuffs him and tells him not to "make it harder than it already is." During the road trip, Noah chastises him about the murder of Jesse at the bank and his terrorizing Claire, and Sylar states that "rehabilitation doesn't happen overnight. I am trying."

They track the escapee, Stephen Canfield, to an empty house, unaware that Claire is already there dealing with Canfield herself. The man creates a powerful vortex in the room which nearly sucks in Claire, but Sylar saves her at the last minute. The power gained from Bridget enables him to experience the horror she went through, so he attempts to sincerely apologize to her, but she regards him with anger and disgust, and Bennet emphatically tells him to never to speak to his daughter again. The three find Stephen at an amusement park, where Bennet tries to force him into killing Sylar in exchange for freedom; though Sylar is clearly aware of what Noah is trying to do, he doesn't do anything to stop him. Rather than become a killer, Stephen kills himself with his power instead. Sylar later calmly remarks to Claire that her father doesn't see people with abilities as human, and never will.

Sylar is returned to his cell once more, where he is approached by Daphne Millbrook with an offer to join Pinehearst Industries, who will accept him for what he is. Sylar refuses, wanting to change. After they leave, Sylar revives Peter so he can help Angela Petrelli. Peter is initially skeptical, but Sylar's willingness to change combined with experience with the future Sylar convinces him; Peter's description of the future Gabriel Gray also gives Sylar hope that he can be redeemed. When Peter discovers the Pinehearst logo in her mind and attempts to go there, Sylar tries to stop him from doing so, but Peter easily defeats him due to his wider variety of powers and places him in an artificially induced coma just as he had been. Angela is able to use her powers to wake him so he can rescue Peter, who has been stripped of his powers by Arthur Petrelli. Sylar does as asked, but is convinced by Arthur to turn on Angela. Arthur has Sylar throw a powerless Peter out a seventh-story window, but Peter miraculously survives. In "It's Coming", Arthur reveals that he knows Sylar slowed Peter's fall. Arthur is not angry; instead, he uses this event as evidence that Sylar can use his emotions like Peter could, to obtain someone's power without killing them.

To test this theory, Arthur places Sylar in a dark room with Elle, who is restrained to the floor and still suffers from her uncontrolled ability. She is furious at Sylar for her father's murder and repeatedly electrocutes him to no avail. Sylar confronts Elle with his sorrow for what he's done as well as her sorrow for what she's done. She rages at him and continues to attack, finally collapsing and begging him to kill her so that her pain will go away. He forgives her for turning him into a monster and convinces her to forgive herself for her crimes, wanting to take away her pain without killing her. At that moment, Elle's pain disappears, and she regains control of her ability. Likewise, Sylar is able to absorb her power. Sylar is overwhelmed by this development, as he no longer has to kill to satisfy his hunger. The two appear to rekindle their old feelings for each other as Elle teaches Sylar how to use her ability. In "The Eclipse", Sylar is relieved when he loses his abilities, and wishes to start a new life with Elle. However, after Noah Bennet claims that Angela and Arthur Petrelli are not his real parents and are just manipulating him, Sylar feels betrayed and reverts to his murderous tendencies. Having regained his abilities after the eclipse ended, Sylar expresses seeming remorse and then attacks Elle, using his telekinesis to scalp her.

The next morning Sylar proceeds to cremate her body, receiving a call from Arthur about his absence. Sylar curtly tells Arthur he is not returning and reveals he has a new list in the form of Elle's cell phone contact list. To ascertain the truth for himself, he kills Sue Landers, a human lie detector. He then heads to Pinehearst to confront Arthur, stopping Peter and the Haitian from killing Arthur by freezing the bullet fired at Arthur's head. With both the Haitian and Arthur apparently weakened in attempting to overwhelm one another, Sylar asks Arthur if he is truly his father. Arthur says yes; Sylar detects the lie with Sue Landers' power and proceeds to drive the bullet into Arthur's head, killing him. He then leaves Peter and the Haitian, claiming they do not have anything he desires.

Sylar travels to Primatech, and sets up a mind game for Angela, Claire, Meredith, and Noah Bennet. After locking everyone inside and killing the Primatech staff, he tells them over the PA system that he will turn them all into monsters as they try to hunt him. Noah releases several Level 5 inmates as bait, including Echo Demille, Eric Doyle, and Daniel Pine, but Sylar easily disposes of them. He then injects Meredith with adrenaline, causing her to lose control of her fire ability. She and Noah are then locked in a cell with a single bullet, so Noah will either burn to death or kill Meredith to survive. Claire wants to help, as Sylar expects, forcing her to choose between her grandmother and her father; Claire chooses her father, leaving Angela at Sylar's mercy. He confronts Angela, and finds out that she was only using him for his monstrous qualities. However, she also reveals that she knows who his real parents are, and that they are not the Grays. As Sylar demands to be told the truth, Claire stabs him in the back of the head with a piece of glass, which will prevent him from reviving as long as it remains in place. In the prison cell, Meredith finally loses full control of her power and releases a massive explosion. Primatech goes up in flames with Sylar still inside.

=== Fugitives ===
Following the destruction of Primatech, Sylar is shown to be alive and well (it's later revealed that the fire melted the glass, allowing him to regenerate), and begins to search for his true biological parents. He starts by tracking down his adoptive father, Martin Gray, in Baltimore, making a stop in Pittsburgh to kill an insurance broker who could replicate his signature, and possibly learn the whereabouts of Martin. Sylar learns that Martin had paid to take him off the hands of his supposed father, Samson Gray, in order to escape his marriage with Virginia, Sylar's adoptive mother. After interrogating Martin, Sylar raises his hand, and is about to kill Martin, but holds back and walks away. After taking the address from Martin, Sylar finds Samson's home, only for it to be empty and Nathan Petrelli's agents waiting to ambush him. Although shot at, stunned and restrained, Sylar easily recovers and kills the agents, save one Agent Simmons, whom he tortures for information on Samson's disappearance.

In order to extract more information from Simmons, Sylar invades the house of Luke and Mary Campbell. Waiting for the two to return, Sylar telekinetic-ally pins them, and states he intends to torture them to get Simmons to talk. He then proceeds to torture Mary. In a rage, Luke manages to free himself and boils Sylar's coffee with his own ability: microwave emission. Intrigued, Sylar begins to talk to Luke, telling him exactly why Luke has been in so much trouble, and that he understands Luke's frustration. During this, Simmons frees himself from his bindings and tries to grab his gun to shoot Sylar, but Luke notices this and kills Simmons. Sylar proceeds to leave the house, taking Luke with him only after Luke states he knows where Samson is.

As Sylar and Luke proceed to find Samson, Luke wishes to stop at some local diner to eat, as well as lying to Sylar about Samson's location when prodded. This irritates Sylar to the point where he threatens to simply take Luke's emission ability. Luke simply states that Sylar would never find his father then. Choosing to stop at a diner, Luke reveals that he and Samson went birding, awakening a memory from Sylar's childhood. As they eat, Sylar teaches Luke some lessons about using his power and having objectives, as well as revealing the change in his 'hunger' (emphasizing finding Samson over acquiring powers). This results in Luke giving Sylar Samson's location, even under the threat of being killed for his power. They are soon interrupted by Nathan's agents. Luke distracts the agents enough for Sylar to telekinetic-ally toss a few around and punch a hole through a window. However, as he gets into the car, Sylar locks Luke out and drives off, leaving Luke to the agents. However, a short time later, Sylar disguises as an agent and gets into their van, killing the agents and saving Luke, as well as taking a laptop. When confronted about this by Luke, Sylar states that Luke was simply conveniently nearby and that his goal was to get the laptop to understand how Nathan's agents worked, though Luke seems skeptical about that reasoning.

Continuing to elude Nathan's agents, Sylar and Luke finally lose them. Irritated with Luke's wish to fry some agents and subtle attempts to stop the search for Samson, Sylar pins Luke to the side of the truck, essentially telling Luke to shut up. Sylar then seems to remember the area in which the two are in, and they reach an abandoned diner. Sylar makes an entrance by pulling off some of the board (throwing them in Luke's direction) and they enter. Here, Sylar recounts being brought to the diner as a child, and dropping a toy car in a wooden post. To prove this memory true, he rips open the post telekinetic-ally and finds the car. He then remembers exactly what happened at that place: His father took money from Virginia and Martin, then left to his car. Sylar followed, only to see his biological parents arguing, and Samson telekinetic-ally splitting his mother's skull open, killing her. In a rage exacerbated by Luke's revelation that Sylar's father was indeed a bad individual, Sylar pins him to the diner wall, but drops him and tells Luke to go home. Sylar leaves, intent on not only finding, but killing his father.

Arriving at a run-down trailer in the woods, Sylar finds his father old and dying of cancer. Samson is not frightened by Sylar's threat to kill and instead prepares a rabbit for taxidermy. Demonstrating several abilities, he and Sylar realize that they have the same ability - the ability to steal powers. Samson reveals that it did not matter how many people he killed or how many powers he stole; in the end, he did not lead a fulfilling life and is now miserable. He claims to not even remember selling Sylar and killing his mother, as these things did not matter to him. He goes on to say how he would have lived life differently, if given a second chance - how he would risk everything to attain true power and ultimately change the world. He touches on Sylar's original guilt for murdering to steal abilities by mocking Sylar, telling him how both their victims were weak and helpless and that they had no chance against seasoned killers. However, when Sylar cuts himself and heals while stuffing the rabbit, Samson transforms, reviving his hunger for abilities, desperate to gain immortality and escape from death. Temporarily incapacitating Sylar, he is stunned when Sylar first resists and then retaliates, strangling Samson with his own oxygen tube. Samson does not understand, since both he and Sylar know that Sylar would not die from Samson's "examination". Sylar states that he is finishing what he came to do, taking the stuffed rabbit. Samson begs Sylar to kill him quickly, but Sylar refuses, relishing the fact that his father, who is ultimately just like him, will "die alone with his disease". Later, when Danko returns home to his apartment after discovering Nathan's ability, he finds the stuffed rabbit on his desk, unaware that Sylar is lurking in the shadows nearby. Instead of a confrontation, however, Sylar chooses to leave, but not before stringing up an unconscious Eric Doyle in Danko's apartment as a 'gift'.

This 'gift' is explained further when Sylar surprises Danko in his car: He wishes to work with Danko in rounding up all super-powered humans, and quickly leaves before Danko can pull out his gun. To further win Danko's trust, Sylar decides to help Danko track a shapeshifter, James Martin, who managed to kill 4 of Danko's agents (3 via gunshot, and one murdered for his form). At Martin's apartment, Danko surprises Sylar, and the two exchange taunts and information, resulting in Sylar and Danko teaming up for the time being. Through their cooperation, the two find out that Martin takes forms of power and authority, in order to woo women at a local nightclub. At the club, Sylar and Danko are spotted by Martin (in the form of Danko), and they lose track of him. A short time later, Danko and Sylar decide to leave the club; however, the 'Sylar' is actually Martin in disguise with the intention of killing Danko. However, Danko shoots Martin, but doesn't kill him. Instead, he allows the real Sylar to take Martin's ability (without removing the skullcap) in order to not only make hunting superpowered humans easier for them, but to fake Sylar's death and keep people such as Noah Bennett from trying to track Sylar down.

Sylar, disguised as Danko, later meets Noah at Building 26 as Noah, unknowingly, examines Martin's body. Noah, knowing how hard it is to kill Sylar, doubts Danko could do it single-handedly. When Sandra arrives to question Noah about Claire, Sylar shakes her hand in introduction, gaining access to her form. Wanting to destroy Noah, he later visits Noah at Noah's apartment, in disguise as Sandra. He delivers divorce papers, stating that he (Sandra) cannot trust Noah anymore and that their marriage is over. Noah is distraught but, upon examining the signature on the forms, discovers that it is not Sandra's. Rushing to the crematorium, Noah stops the cremation of Martin's body. He removes the metal shard in the back of the corpse's head, telling the surrounding soldiers that when Sylar was stabbed with a glass shard before, it melted in the Primatech fire allowing him to regenerate. When the corpse does not regenerate, Noah returns to Danko and confronts him with the knowledge that Sylar is still alive. Danko confesses and tells Noah that Sylar is in disguise and out on a mission with other soldiers. Noah forces Danko to take him to Sylar and, when they arrive, shoots the soldier Danko identifies as Sylar in the back of the head. When the corpse continues to bleed out and does not heal, Danko orders his men to capture Noah, who Danko claims has gone insane. However, when the soldiers leave in pursuit, the corpse gets up and shifts back into Sylar. When Danko asks him how he survived while bleeding so much, Sylar says it was all to make his death look realistic.

As Sylar continues to shapeshift, he finds it is harder and harder to regain his form without side effects, including left over body parts like teeth. He also retains personality traits and memories of those he changes into, causing him to go through a literal "identity crisis". When Danko tells him that he needs to leave his "Sylar" identity behind to retain his free pass, Sylar kills the next target on Danko's list, Tom Miller, and takes his power. Further examining the shapeshifting ability, Sylar realizes he is actually absorbing different DNA sequences into his body, causing him to permanently change a little each time he shifts. When Sylar starts to shapeshift in his sleep, Danko tells him he has to find an anchor that will remind him of who he is. To that effect, Sylar, as one of Danko's agents, retrieves the evidence from the homicide of his mother, Virginia Gray. While examining her collection of snow globes, Sylar unknowingly shapeshifts into his mother and begins to have a conversation with himself, showing acute symptoms of dissociative identity disorder. He at first does not realize what is happening and talks to his mother about his encounter with Samson, why his mother lied to Sylar about his lineage, and how he is starting to lose himself. He, as his mother, tries to convince himself that he did not mean to kill her and that he is still special. Danko interrupts when his agents track down Rebel. Sylar gets to Rebel (Micah Sanders) before Danko's agents do and prepares to kill him and take his power. Micah, however, reveals that he understands what Sylar is going through because his mother, Niki Sanders, endured the same thing when her power manifested. Convinced that Sylar is special and the only one capable of saving those with powers, Micah convinces Sylar to join his cause. Sylar, disguised as Micah, tricks Danko and his agents into chasing the wrong person, allowing Micah to escape. Sylar, again talking with "his mother", reveals that her murder was no accident, but "Virginia" forgives Sylar anyway, convinced that he can still be whomever he wants to be, including the President. Realizing his opportunity, Sylar breaks into Nathan Petrelli's office and finds a brush containing some of Nathan's DNA. He later appears, as Nathan, at a press conference concerning new plans for change he has for the country and how he soon plans to meet with the President and "shake his hand". Realizing what Sylar is trying to do, Nathan returns to DC from Coyote Sands and confronts Sylar, who reveals he has examined Nathan's life in depth using clairsentience. Expressing pity and determined to become better than Nathan, Sylar prepares to take Nathan's ability when Danko appears and stuns Nathan. Attempting to salvage his operation, Danko orders Sylar to shift back into one of his agents so they can continue hunting specials. When Sylar refuses, Danko stabs him in the back of the head with a knife. However, Sylar recovers, having used his shapeshifting ability to relocate his weak spot.

After framing Danko for the murder of an agent, he takes on Nathan's form and goes to meet the President with Claire in tow. When she discovers the truth, he controls her using the power which he had empathically absorbed from Eric Doyle and talks about how similar they are, both being adopted and both having the ability to live forever, proposing that, given enough time, Claire might come to forgive him and even love him. However, Peter and Nathan then confront him, and in the battle Sylar and Nathan fly out of a window and into another room. Sylar subsequently kills Nathan (after empathically absorbing his power during the fight) and takes on the form of the President's Chief of Staff. However, the President injects him with an elephant tranquilizer, and reveals himself to be Peter, having absorbed Sylar's ability during the fight. In an effort to shut down the program, Angela convinces Matt Parkman to use his telepathy to convince Sylar that he is Nathan, Matt using Angela's memories of Nathan's life to essentially 'plant' Nathan in Sylar's head, his shape-shifting power allowing him to assume Nathan's form while his clairsentience will allow him to subconsciously use objects around him to 'fill in the blanks'. Sylar, as Nathan, talks to the President and convinces him to shut down Building 26 and divert the funds to the new Company that will now be built. Later, Sylar, as Nathan, watches "Sylar's" (in reality James Martin's) body burn at Coyote Sands alongside Noah, Claire, Matt, Angela, Peter, Mohinder, Hiro and Ando.

=== Redemption ===
==== Memory loss ====
Six weeks later, this Nathan starts to rediscover the other powers he had gained in his old life. Later, following Nathan's confession of being involved in the accidental death of his girlfriend Kelly Houston, her mother, Millie Houston, has him shot and buried in a shallow grave. When healed, Sylar emerges from the ground in his own body, suffering from amnesia. Picked up by the police, he is recognized and accidentally uses his powers to escape. He then encounters the "Sullivan Bros. Carnival" and Samuel, who take him in as one of their own. The carnival is hidden from Sylar's pursuers, and Samuel assures him he is safe in his new "home".

Once Sylar has rested, Samuel proceeds to show him around the circus, showing that everyone at the carnival has an ability. Sylar also meets Lydia, who he immediately hits it off with. Edgar, however, jealously attempts to out-show Sylar with his power, but is easily beaten. Samuel also notices that Sylar's memories are not his (in fact, Nathan Petrelli's). In an effort to awaken Sylar's true personality, Sylar is taken by Damien to the hall of mirrors, where he is forced to look at his past murders, starting with his mother. Repulsed, Sylar is unable to believe himself a monster. Samuel uses this to try and convince Sylar that he is a protector of the circus, and must remove threats such as the officer who attempted to capture him the night before. Sylar is told the officer is at the house of mirrors, and goes there to tell the man to leave. However, the officer shoots at Sylar, forcing an uncontrolled electric blast. Here, Sylar's killer instinct begins to take hold, but Sylar stops himself just in time for Edgar to cut the man into pieces. Later, Samuel formally makes Sylar a part of the circus family, baptizing him and letting him mingle with the others. Sylar and Lydia leave arm in arm for the night, much to Edgar's dismay.

In "Shadowboxing", the persona of Nathan returns, causing him to shapeshift back into Nathan's form while sleeping. Panicking upon finding himself at the carnival, he flies away, and is later shown arriving at Peter's door, asking for help. Arriving for work at his office, Peter and Nathan discover that no one has been looking for Nathan, as he had been on 'vacation' according to Angela Petrelli. The brothers are further surprised when the Haitian appears, and tells Peter to go see a storage facility for the truth of the situation. Here, Nathan and Peter discover the real Nathan's preserved body, which 'Nathan' touches and sees Sylar and Matt Parkman. They head to Texas to see Matt, who is at the hospital, in a coma.

==== Haunting Matt Parkman ====
Meanwhile, Matt Parkman, regretting his actions, is haunted by Sylar, who claims to have lingered in Parkman's mind after Parkman "sucked" all his memories and replaced them with Nathan's. Though Parkman had resolved not to use his powers anymore, Sylar eventually tempts him into using them again. Following this, Sylar escalates his tormenting of Parkman, using his own telepathy against him to force Parkman to use his powers to save himself. Sylar then gives a defeated Parkman an ultimatum: either continue to live with Sylar in his mind or return Sylar's mind to his body.

Matt decides to keep Sylar in his mind, which begins to have consequences when Sylar's control over Matt advances, where Sylar has sex with Matt's wife Janice while Matt was asleep. Scared of what Sylar could do to his family (which Sylar himself alludes to), Matt tells Janice the truth, and Janice agrees to let Matt try to exorcise Sylar by leaving the house. During another conversation, Sylar appears pained whenever Parkman drinks alcohol, giving Parkman the idea to drink into a stupor. Sylar appears successfully removed as he fades from Matt's mind, and Matt remains conscious long enough to see his partner and Janice return. In actuality, Sylar simply tricked Parkman into knocking himself out. Now much more powerful, Sylar takes full control of Parkman's body, leaving Matt trapped in his own head. Despite his control over the body, Matt's personality constantly hampers Sylar from reaching his body, including letting Sylar be arrested and "withholding" Sylar's ability to use Matt's telepathy. In response, Sylar threatens to murder innocent civilians if Parkman doesn't cooperate. Faced with an ultimatum, Parkman attempts to commit suicide by cop.

The attempt appears to almost work, but "Nathan" and Peter arrive to revive Matt. Once revived, Matt is surprised to see Nathan and Peter, as is Sylar. Desperate to return to his original body, Sylar forcefully takes over Parkman's body, only needing to touch Nathan in order to jump back into his own body. While "Nathan's" confidence in who he is is shattered (Matt reveals that "Nathan" is Sylar), Sylar uses Parkman's telepathy to bring Nathan closer to him, with intuitive aptitude forcing Nathan to throw Peter telekinetic-ally and proceed to get closer, to understand who he is. Although the event is temporarily stalled by an incoming guard, Nathan brushes hands with Matt, freeing him from Sylar's hold, and leaving Nathan fearful that Sylar will soon take over his body once more.

==== Whole again ====
Staying over at Peter Petrelli's apartment, the brothers are surprised by Angela, who springs a Thanksgiving dinner on them. Nathan wakes up in time to hear Peter and Angela discussing the discovery of Nathan's body. Although they press her for information, Angela threatens to simply leave if they do not sit down and eat. During the dinner, Angela finally confesses that she had Matt Parkman place Nathan's mind into Sylar's body. During dessert, however, Nathan begins to act oddly, and transforms back into Sylar, happy to be controlling his body once more. He telekinetically traps Peter and Angela, relishing his ability to control himself. After taunting Peter, he begins to scalp Angela, only to have the 'Nathan' persona fight back. Losing control, Sylar transforms back into Nathan, who flees the building to protect his family. Peter devises a plan to eliminate the 'Sylar' persona leaving just Nathan using the ability of The Haitian to erase Sylar's memories. On a rooftop however, "Nathan" confesses to Peter he is not himself and cannot keep fighting off the 'Sylar' persona. Nathan jumps off the building and lands onto a parked car. Peter then sees Sylar heal, get up and wave as he walks away.

Sylar returns to the carnival to face Samuel, but Sylar finds that while he wants to kill, he is unable to make himself do so. His identity in crisis, he makes a deal with Samuel. After absorbing Lydia's power, he tells Samuel to give him a tattoo, and that he would do whatever it said. When he sees the tattoo, he decides that he does not belong at the carnival. The next scene shows him floating outside of Claire Bennet's dorm room window, and his tattoo is a picture of her.

In the episode "Pass/Fail", Sylar kidnaps Claire Bennet's friend, Gretchen Berg so Claire will talk to him in exchange for her friend. Sylar feels like they are very similar: they've never felt in place, they both lost their parents, and they are both immortal. Claire doesn't want to talk to him, and makes him tell her where Gretchen is. Claire finds Gretchen tied up, and they hide in a closet and have a talk. Claire tells Gretchen that Sylar thinks they are alike, and she fears that they might be. She is confused at Sylar's attitude, but resents him for who he is. Gretchen comes to the conclusion that Sylar's powers have isolated him from ever having any relationships. Giving them up might be the only way he could have any connections. Gretchen then shape-shifts back into Sylar. He then goes to Matt Parkman and asks him to take away all his powers away. Matt attempts but fails. Sylar threatens Matt's family and forces him to keep trying. Instead, Matt traps Sylar and his powers deep within the confines of his mind, "somewhere you'll never find them," and he is left alone to live out his worst nightmare: Being all alone. Matt then attempts to seal up Sylar within the walls of his basement. However, Peter Petrelli arrives after having a vision that Sylar will save Emma. Using Matt's power, Peter attempts to bring Sylar out of his nightmare, but ends up trapped in Sylar's mind along with him (The Art of Deception).

In "The Wall", Sylar is repairing endless watches in the empty city when he hears banging. Searching for the source of it, he finds Peter using a pole to get his attention by banging it on the concrete. Sylar is shocked to discover that Peter is real and says there's no way out - he's been searching for three years. Peter reveals that it's actually been three hours and that Sylar is trapped in a nightmare, which he is skeptical to accept, and runs back to his shop. Peter tries to convince him of the truth and tells him he must save Emma. He tries to pull them out of the nightmare but is unsuccessful. Peter avoids Sylar for a month while trapped, and Sylar tries being friendly by giving him a 9th Wonders! comic book. Peter, determined to find a way out, does not understand why Sylar is so resistant to find a way out, and realizes that Sylar really doesn't want to be free. They come across a massive brick wall, the same one Sylar's body is actually trapped behind (in Matt's basement). Peter realizes that the two need to break the wall in order to escape. At first Peter tries to break it alone, but fails. Sylar compares his determination to a memory of Nathan's he possesses which angers Peter. Sylar apologizes for Nathan's murder, but Peter refuses to forgive him and Sylar finally joins Peter in attempting to break down the wall. After years of attempting and failing to damage the wall in the slightest, Sylar is surprised when Peter gives him a copy of The Pillars of the Earth as a gift as a to thank him for keeping him sane all the years of their imprisonment. Sylar admits he always worries Peter will attack him with the sledge-hammer which Peter admits he has contemplated. Sylar realizes that Peter won't let go of his anger out of fear of losing the last remnant of Nathan, and points out to Peter that he has truly changed. Peter finally accepts this fact and afterwards the two are easily able to break a hole in the wall, which frees them from their mental prison. Once freed, Sylar uses telekinesis to free him from his physical one and he and Peter learn that they've only been trapped for half a day in reality. The experience seems to have changed both Sylar and Peter and the two head off to save Emma, but are stopped by Eli and his clones who want to prevent their plans.

In "Brave New World," he and Peter easily defeat Eli and save Matt's life as knocking out the Prime Eli gets rid of his clones who were about to kill Matt. Sylar tries to convince a furious Matt that he's changed, but fails and begins to leave with Peter (who read Eli's mind and learned Samuel's plans). Matt tries to telepathically prevent Sylar from leaving, so Sylar asks Matt to read his mind to show him he has changed. Matt is unable to, although he does let them leave. Peter and Sylar fly to New York where Samuel plans to kill thousands of people. Peter is reluctant, but Sylar convinces Peter to trust him and reminds him that the dream says that Sylar saves Emma. Sylar heads off to the tent to save Emma while Peter goes to defeat Samuel. He finds Emma playing the cello with bloody fingers, and tries to save her by taking the cello, but is taken control of by Eric Doyle, the Puppet Master. Doyle, desperate to be better than Sylar, begins to taunt him. However, controlling and mocking Sylar distracts him from his primary focus on controlling Emma. Once Emma realizes he has loosened his control over her, Emma blasts Doyle with a soundwave through the cello, breaking Doyle's control over Sylar, and giving Sylar the chance to telekinetically grab onto Doyle. Doyle begs him to stop, and asks, "What do you care about this girl, anyway?" Sylar tells him that he's going to save her. Confused, Doyle cries out, "That's not you! You're like me!" Sylar looks at him and calmly says, "No. I'm a hero." After Peter reunites with Emma, she tells him that his friend is taking care of Doyle. Fearing the worst, Peter heads into the tent to find Sylar admiring his new "masterpiece": a dazed Doyle trussed up like a puppet, clad in giant light-bulbs. Sylar plugs the lights in, deviously grins, and says, "I like it!"

=== Brave New World ===
Sylar walks with Peter and discusses his rescue of Emma. Sylar explains that he could have easily killed Doyle but didn't and that not killing him and saving Emma felt good to him, showing that Sylar is truly changing and is enjoying being a hero rather than a villain. Peter and Sylar witness Claire climbing the Ferris Wheel to reveal her powers to the world and Sylar comments that it's now a "brave new world."

== Alternate timelines ==
- In the first alternate future depicted, set five years ahead in the episode "Five Years Gone", Sylar has gained countless new abilities, including those of Candice Wilmer and D. L. Hawkins. Nathan Petrelli, now the President, concocted a story for the explanation of New York's destruction, which blamed Sylar for the explosion, and he is assumed to be deceased. Sylar is able to use Candice's ability to murder Nathan and assume his identity. As President, he begins a campaign to hunt and exterminate all people with abilities, claiming that it will unite the world in grief. In reality, he doesn't want the competition. When Claire Bennet is captured he has her brought to him, pretending to be her father. He simply desires one final ability, hers. Later, while giving a speech in the ruins of New York, he is informed by Matt Parkman that Peter, the future Hiro and Ando are staging an attack to free the present-day Hiro. Upon hearing this, Sylar, disguised as Nathan, flies away from the crowd. He confronts Peter, revealing himself, and they prepare for battle, an outcome left ambiguous.
- In a timeline set four years in the future, as seen in the season three episode "I Am Become Death", Sylar has reassumed his identity of Gabriel Gray and is working to suppress his homicidal hunger for the sake of his son, Noah, who lives with him and Mr. Muggles in Claire's former home in Costa Verde. He is visited by the Peter Petrelli of the present, who is intent on learning how to activate the intuitive ability he has absorbed from him so that he can understand the complexities of changing the timeline. Gabriel is initially reluctant, resisting telepathic compulsion to teach Peter, but ultimately relents and tutors him after painting a precognitive picture of the Earth exploding, despite warning Peter that with the intuitive ability comes the same homicidal hunger he has been trying to resist. Shortly afterwards, a team led by Claire Bennet storms the house intent on killing Peter, and in the ensuing fight, Noah is killed. Enraged and grief-stricken, Gabriel loses control of his radiation ability and releases a nuclear detonation, destroying Costa Verde and killing over 200,000 people. It remains unknown whether or not he survived the explosion.
- In the original timeline, Sylar kills Charlie Andrews and takes her power of eidetic memory (Seven Minutes to Midnight). In season four, Hiro goes back in time and prevents this, actually enlisting Sylar's help to save her from a blood clot (Once Upon a Time in Texas).

== Powers and abilities ==
Sylar's base power, as described by Chandra Suresh, is "intuitive aptitude", the ability to innately understand and manipulate patterns within complex systems, which initially manifests as a talent for repairing timepieces. As revealed in "One of Us, One of Them", this power comes with a nearly insatiable hunger for "understanding" which in Sylar's case specifically refers to craving the powers of others, driving him to kill other super-powered humans to understand their powers and make them his own. Despite the strength of this hunger, two episodes have shown that it can be satiated or resisted: in the alternate future of "Five Years Gone", Sylar has taken on so many abilities that he now desires to get rid of all of his potential "competition". In the future of "I Am Become Death" he has resumed his identity as Gabriel Gray and denies his hunger for the sake of his son. In "Once Upon a Time in Texas" it is revealed that Sylar can also identify deformities in people such as Charlie's blood clot and Hiro's brain tumor.

Sylar's intuitive aptitude allows him to deduce the workings of the powers of others; by examining the brain of his victim, he is able to find the brain's connection to the ability and immediately replicate the power himself. The exact mechanics behind this are unknown though it is theorized by characters that DNA alteration/infusions is what allows him to obtain abilities. When the process is shown, Sylar only seems to touch the part of the brain that is the source of the ability and immediately replicates it. Sylar cannot acquire an ability from a person who has been dead a while, even if their brains are intact. In "Fallout", Noah Bennet theorizes that Sylar's additional powers are a product of using foreign DNA to alter his own which, as a side effect, has driven him insane.

Of all the powers Sylar has acquired, the most prominently used is telekinesis, which is the first power he took. In contrast to the limited abilities Brian Davis displayed, Sylar's skills are far more advanced; he exhibits both fine control (precisely cutting open the skulls of his victims) and sheer force (flipping a police van), can enhance his own strength and durability to superhuman levels, (Note: As seen in "Homecoming", when he casually throws Claire across the locker room and into a wall with one arm and with enough force to break her arm and severely lacerate her face. Also, when Peter falls off the roof and takes Sylar with him, Sylar gets up and walks away without a scratch off-screen, while Peter is "killed" from the fall.) and can control a person's motor skills in a manner similar to Eric Doyle's puppet mastery. (Note: As seen when Sylar attempts to force Agent Hanson to shoot herself in the head in One Giant Leap.) Tests done on Sylar by Bennet's associate Hank show no overt signs of powers other than telekinesis; while their tests show that he possesses other powers, they are unable to identify what they are. In "The Hard Part", Sylar demonstrates he can use at least two of his acquired abilities at the same time.

During his first killing spree, Sylar acquires or displays the following abilities:

Power	Source	Episode
Telekinesis	Brian Davis	"Six Months Ago"
Kinetic energy projection	Trevor Zeitlan	"Villains"
Cryokinesis	James Walker	"Don't Look Back"
Enhanced memory (Note: In Season Four's "Once Upon a Time in Texas", Hiro travels back in time and prevents Sylar from killing Charlie and gaining this ability.)	Charlie Andrews	"Seven Minutes to Midnight"
Liquification	Zane Taylor	"Run!"
Enhanced hearing	Dale Smither	"Unexpected"
Precognition (expressed through visual art)	Isaac Mendez	".07%"
Induced radioactivity	Ted Sprague	"Landslide"

After being injected with the Shanti virus by the Company, Sylar loses all of his abilities. After he is cured at the end of the second season, he only regains his abilities of intuitive aptitude and telekinesis. Sylar's empathic mimicry, which Arthur says he has had all along, is also present. In the third and fourth seasons, Sylar acquires or displays the following abilities:

Power	Source	Episode / Graphic Novel
Rapid cellular regeneration	Claire Bennet	"The Second Coming"
Alchemic transmutation	Bob Bishop	"The Butterfly Effect"
Psychometry	Bridget Bailey	"One of Us, One of Them"
Sound manipulation (expressed through voice)	Jesse Murphy	"One of Us, One of Them"
Electric manipulation	Elle Bishop	"It's Coming"
Lie detection	Sue Landers	"Our Father"
Thoughtography	Joe Macon	"Out of Town...On Business"
Shapeshifting	James Martin	"Into Asylum"
Disintegration	Tom Miller	"I Am Sylar"
Flight (Note: Ability confirmed in season fourth's episode "Shadowboxing")	Nathan Petrelli	"An Invisible Thread"
Empathy	Lydia	"Let It Bleed"

In "It's Coming", Sylar learns how to gain abilities without removing a person's brain, obtaining Elle Bishop's power of electric manipulation by empathizing with her and convincing her to let go of her anger. This empathy allowed him to retain the use of Brian Davis' telekinesis after being cured of the virus, due to the guilt he felt over his death. Arthur explains that Sylar possessed this ability all along. Despite possessing this ability, he has returned to killing to obtain new powers, though he later uses this method to obtain James Martin's shapeshifting ability, Nathan Petrelli's ability to fly, and also Lydia's empathy.

As a side effect of the use of the shapeshifting ability when used in combination with his acquired psychometry, his mind has begun to fracture into the different personas of those whom he has shapeshifted into, and residual physical characteristics have started to appear, such as his adoptive mother when he came into contact with the dried blood on the scissors he killed her with. As stated in "I Am Sylar", his "Achilles' heel" in the back of his head has been relocated due to his continued shapeshifting, making him harder to stop. Aside from superhuman abilities, Sylar is very intelligent and manipulative and possesses decent hand-to-hand combat skills, as seen when he fights Peter.

== Reception ==
Sylar was named one of the best new villains by Entertainment Weekly. Sylar was also named the best villain of 2007 by IGN. UGO also ranked Sylar 6th on their list of top 50 TV characters.

== In other media ==
Zachary Quinto provides the voice of a Robot Chicken-parodied Sylar in the episode "Bionic Cow". In it, he kills a man named "Uncle Glen", who is apparently able to remove his fingers, failing to realize that this is a simple sleight of hand trick to impress young children. He instead inherits Glen's power of "explosive diarrhea," remarking that "every once in a while, this power backfires".
