= Claire Bennet =

Fictional character in the NBC superhero drama series Heroes

- Heroes character
- Hayden Panettiere as Claire Bennet
- First appearance: "Genesis"; September 25, 2006
- Last appearance: "Brave New World"; February 8, 2010
- Created by: Tim Kring
- Portrayed by: Hayden Panettiere

In-universe information
- Alias: The Cheerleader
- Nicknames: Vivian Lewis, Claire Butler, Bonnie Monaco, Claire Petrelli, Alice Shaw
- Family: Noah Bennet † (adoptive father); Sandra Bennet (adoptive mother); Lyle Bennet (adoptive brother)
- Significant others: West Rosen (ex-boyfriend); Gretchen Berg (ex-girlfriend); Hammer (ex-boyfriend)
- Children: Tommy Clark; Malina Bennet
- Relatives: Nathan Petrelli † (biological father); Meredith Gordon † (biological mother); Angela Petrelli (paternal grandmother); Monty Petrelli (paternal half-brother); Simon Petrelli (paternal half-brother); Arthur Petrelli † (paternal grandfather); Peter Petrelli (paternal uncle); Flint Gordon Jr. † (maternal uncle)
- Ability: Rapid cellular regeneration
- Status: Deceased; June 13, 2014

Claire Bennet is a fictional character in the NBC superhero drama series Heroes. The character was created by Tim Kring. She was portrayed by Hayden Panettiere and first appeared on television in the pilot episode of the series, "Genesis", on September 25, 2006. She is a high school cheerleader with the power of rapid cellular regeneration. Claire appears in more episodes than any other character (72, plus a 73rd through stock footage). Panettiere did not return to reprise the role for the sequel series Heroes Reborn, in which her character is said to have died while giving birth to Malina and Tommy.

Thanks to her power, she has an incredibly high pain tolerance; Claire states in "The Butterfly Effect" that, when injured, she feels pain just as severe as anyone else who was injured in such a way, but her power quickly deadens pain. When asked about this, series writers Joe Pokaski and Aron Coleite would only comment that she "feels pain, but not the way most of us do." Claire, describing her response to pain to West, says "I feel pain; I just get over it quickly." Between her tolerance for pain and seemingly unlimited healing potential, Panettiere compared her character to the X-Men character Wolverine. Since having her brain examined by Sylar, Claire has stated that she no longer feels physical pain of any kind.

== Casting ==
Marc Hirschfeld, executive vice president of casting for NBC Universal Television stated, "When they were trying to decide who the cheerleader should be, I literally picked up the phone and said to the producers, 'You've got to meet Hayden Panettiere.'"

In an interview with Vanity Fair, Emma Stone revealed that she had auditioned for the role of Claire Bennet. She said it was her rock bottom Hollywood moment; she overheard, "You are our pick ... On a scale of 1 to 10 you’re an 11," and then she realized the role had gone to Panettiere.

== Reception and analysis ==
Panettiere received positive reviews for her work on the show throughout the series run, constantly being referred to as a "breakout star". Claire is also arguably one of the most popular characters on the show. UGO Networks listed Claire as one of their best heroes of all time.

Professor of audiovisual arts Olvido Andújar Molina saw the character of Claire Bennet as a metaphor for the United States of America, as her role as a cheerleader functioned as one of the basic American cultural archetypes. Claire Bennet's special ability was regeneration from any kind of accident, which in this reading symbolizes the idea of the United States being invincible in the long term. Andújar Molina expands the idea to the character of Nathan Petrelli: as he is discovered as Claire's biological father, he represents the father figure and protector of the country as a whole. Molina thought that this identification of the characters, together with their presentation as heroes trying to save the world, contributed to their positive reception and identification with the audience.

After Panettiere's death in 2026, NME wrote that, as Claire, Panettiere "never tried to hide her human frailties but she’ll be remembered, with poignant irony, for playing someone who seemed indestructible."
