= Hiro Nakamura =

Fictional superhero in Heroes

- Heroes character
- First appearance: "Genesis"; Heroes; September 25, 2006
- Last appearance: "June 13th Part Two"; Heroes Reborn; November 5, 2015
- Created by: Tim Kring
- Portrayed by: Masi Oka; Garrett Masuda (child, season 1); Sekai Murashige (child, seasons 2–3); Mikey Kawata (teenager)

In-universe information
- Occupation: Office worker (formerly); Hired hero; Company CEO
- Family: Kaito Nakamura (father); Kimiko Nakamura (sister)
- Ability: Space-time manipulation, resulting in: Chronokinesis; Time travel; Teleportation

Hiro Nakamura (中村広, Nakamura Hiro; ヒロ・ナカムラ Hiro Nakamura) is a fictional superhero on the NBC superhero drama Heroes who possesses the ability of space-time manipulation, allowing him to alter the flow of time, teleport and time travel. In the show, he is portrayed by Japanese actor Masi Oka. Hiro was based on the writer's childhood comic book heroes spanning the DC and Marvel universe.

According to the online comic on NBC.com, Hiro is named after Hiroshima, so his family will always remember the atomic bombings of Hiroshima and Nagasaki. Tim Kring has been quoted as saying, "It's no coincidence we named him Hiro... he truly is on a hero's quest." To this end, his name is often used as a pun. His co-worker and best friend Ando once called him "Super-Hiro" in jest.

== Character development ==
Hiro was one of the last main characters to be created by Kring; he was added to the pilot episode after Kring's wife noticed none of the existing main characters were happy about their powers. During a panel session, Kring explained that he developed Hiro as a comic book geek "trapped in a life that was kind of not of his making". Thus, viewers were introduced to Hiro as an office worker in a sea of cubicles. In an interview, Tim Kring noted, "I didn't start off by saying I want a guy who can teleport. I started off by saying I wanted a guy who felt trapped in a life that was not his dream and what could be a power that would be most wish-fulfilling for that character? And that was the ability to teleport out of that life."

== Character synopsis ==
Hiro Nakamura is an office worker living in Tokyo, Japan, working as a level-3 programmer at Yamagato Industries when one day he discovers he has the power to bend time and space. An otaku, Hiro is an avid fan of superheroes and science fiction. Naïve and over-eager, Hiro is the one character that aspires to the pure heroism of comic book crime fighters, shouldering the responsibility to use his powers for good. His best friend is the skeptical Ando Masahashi. At the start, Hiro is only able to speak Japanese and a little English, relying on Ando as his translator; but as the series progresses, his English slowly develops.

Hiro's Blog, maintained by NBC and written from Hiro's point of view, was updated after each new episode aired, usually about the events of the episode.

== Reception ==
In 2010, UGO Networks listed Hiro as one of their best heroes of all time. The character has had a mixed reception.

Malian-French pop singer Aya Nakamura adapted her stage name from the character.
