= List of Heroes episodes =

The NBC superhero serial drama series Heroes follows the lives of people around the globe who possess various superhuman powers as they struggle to cope with their everyday lives and prevent foreseen disasters from occurring. The series premiered on American and Canadian television on September 25, 2006. The first season, which finished 21st of 142 American primetime television programs in Nielsen ratings, was released on DVD and HD DVD on August 28, 2007. The second season ranked 21st of 220 in the ratings, and was released on DVD and Blu-ray Disc on August 26, 2008, with the Blu-ray release of the first season. The third season aired in two blocks generally without reruns; it premiered on September 22, 2008, on NBC in the United States and on Global in Canada, with a one-hour clip-show and two regular episodes. The fourth season aired from September 21, 2009, to February 8, 2010. Although cast members had stated and speculated that there would be a fifth season, NBC announced on May 14, 2010, that the show was officially cancelled, but that the network was looking at plans to tie up some loose ends in either a miniseries or TV movie.

Within the seasons of Heroes are "volumes", which focus on shorter story arcs. The first season comprises a single volume of 23 episodes called Genesis, which is also the title of the pilot episode. The second season was designed to contain three volumes called Generations, Exodus, and Villains, but Exodus was scrapped due to viewer criticism and the 2007–08 Writers Guild of America strike. Villains was carried over to the show's third season, leaving the second season with only 11 episodes, 13 fewer than were originally ordered by NBC. The third season included 25 episodes, 13 episodes comprising Villains and 12 episodes in a volume titled Fugitives. The fourth season consisted of a fifth volume of 19 episodes titled Redemption. The final scene of the last episode began a sixth volume entitled Brave New World, which became the title of the first episode of Heroes Reborn.

Originally, the second season of Heroes was to be followed in April and May 2008 by six stand-alone episodes of a new series, Heroes: Origins, which was intended as an alternative to a long mid-season hiatus like the one that led to a drop in ratings for Heroes in its first season. The project, which was later planned to be 12 episodes, was indefinitely postponed due to a decline in viewership and the strike and was eventually cancelled to keep "the Heroes mothership as strong as possible," according to NBC co-chairman Ben Silverman. A series of three webisodes collectively titled Going Postal became available exclusively online in July 2008. Following the release of Going Postal, four more sets of webisodes were produced, titled Heroes: Destiny, The Recruit, Hard Knox, and Nowhere Man, which stars David H. Lawrence as Eric Doyle. On September 28, 2009, a new set of webisodes titled Slow Burn was released, starring members of the "Sullivan Bros. Carnival" from season four, Lydia, Edgar and Samuel. Slow Burn was set up as a Web Exclusive for the promotion of Sprint Now, and each webisode was released at the same time as the episodes of the main television series.

== Series overview ==
Season	Volume	Episodes		Originally released	
Season	Volume	Episodes		First released	Last released
1	Genesis	23		September 25, 2006	May 21, 2007
2	Generations	11		September 24, 2007	December 3, 2007
3	Villains	25	13	September 22, 2008	December 15, 2008
3	Fugitives	25	12	February 2, 2009	April 27, 2009
4	Redemption	19		September 21, 2009	February 8, 2010

== Main series ==
=== Season 1 (2006–07) ===
No. overall	No. in season	Title	Directed by	Written by	Original release date	US viewers (millions)
Volume One: Genesis
1	1	"Genesis"	David Semel	Tim Kring	September 25, 2006	14.10
2	2	"Don't Look Back"	Allan Arkush	Tim Kring	October 2, 2006	12.96
3	3	"One Giant Leap"	Greg Beeman	Jeph Loeb	October 9, 2006	13.34
4	4	"Collision"	Ernest Dickerson	Bryan Fuller	October 16, 2006	12.96
5	5	"Hiros"	Paul Shapiro	Michael Green	October 23, 2006	14.45
6	6	"Better Halves"	Greg Beeman	Natalie Chaidez	October 30, 2006	14.89
7	7	"Nothing to Hide"	Donna Deitch	Jesse Alexander	November 6, 2006	14.47
8	8	"Seven Minutes to Midnight"	Paul Edwards	Tim Kring	November 13, 2006	15.08
9	9	"Homecoming"	Greg Beeman	Adam Armus & Kay Foster	November 20, 2006	16.03
10	10	"Six Months Ago"	Allan Arkush	Aron Eli Coleite	November 27, 2006	15.56
11	11	"Fallout"	John Badham	Joe Pokaski	December 4, 2006	14.94
12	12	"Godsend"	Paul Shapiro	Tim Kring	January 22, 2007	14.90
13	13	"The Fix"	Terrence O'Hara	Natalie Chaidez	January 29, 2007	13.63
14	14	"Distractions"	Jeannot Szwarc	Michael Green	February 5, 2007	14.61
15	15	"Run!"	Roxann Dawson	Adam Armus & Kay Foster	February 12, 2007	14.68
16	16	"Unexpected"	Greg Beeman	Jeph Loeb	February 19, 2007	14.10
17	17	"Company Man"	Allan Arkush	Bryan Fuller	February 25, 2007 (Note: This episode aired on the Global Television Network in Canada a day earlier than on NBC in the United States.)	14.42
18	18	"Parasite"	Kevin Bray	Christopher Zatta	March 4, 2007	14.90
19	19	".07%"	Adam Kane	Chuck Kim	April 23, 2007	11.96
20	20	"Five Years Gone"	Paul Edwards	Joe Pokaski	April 30, 2007	11.92
21	21	"The Hard Part"	John Badham	Aron Eli Coleite	May 7, 2007	11.14
22	22	"Landslide"	Greg Beeman	Jesse Alexander	May 14, 2007	11.54
23	23	"How to Stop an Exploding Man"	Allan Arkush	Tim Kring	May 21, 2007	13.48

=== Season 2 (2007) ===
No. overall	No. in season	Title	Directed by	Written by	Original release date	US viewers (millions)
Volume Two: Generations
24	1	"Four Months Later..."	Greg Beeman	Tim Kring	September 24, 2007	16.97
25	2	"Lizards"	Allan Arkush	Michael Green	October 1, 2007	11.96
26	3	"Kindred"	Paul Edwards	J.J. Philbin	October 8, 2007	10.91
27	4	"The Kindness of Strangers"	Adam Kane	Tim Kring	October 15, 2007	11.41
28	5	"Fight or Flight"	Lesli Glatter	Joy Blake & Melissa Blake	October 22, 2007	9.44
29	6	"The Line"	Jeannot Szwarc	Adam Armus & Kay Foster	October 29, 2007	10.51
30	7	"Out of Time"	Daniel Attias	Aron Eli Coleite	November 5, 2007	9.88
31	8	"Four Months Ago..."	Greg Beeman	Tim Kring	November 12, 2007	11.16
32	9	"Cautionary Tales"	Greg Yaitanes	Joe Pokaski	November 19, 2007	10.81
33	10	"Truth & Consequences"	Adam Kane	Jesse Alexander	November 26, 2007	11.89
34	11	"Powerless"	Allan Arkush	Jeph Loeb	December 3, 2007	11.06

=== Season 3 (2008–09) ===
No. overall	No. in season	Title	Directed by	Written by	Original release date	US viewers (millions)
Volume Three: Villains
35	1	"The Second Coming"	Allan Arkush	Tim Kring	September 22, 2008	10.09
36	2	"The Butterfly Effect"	Greg Beeman	Tim Kring	September 22, 2008	10.09
37	3	"One of Us, One of Them"	Sergio Mimica-Gezzan	Joe Pokaski	September 29, 2008	9.50
38	4	"I Am Become Death"	David Von Ancken	Aron Eli Coleite	October 6, 2008	8.20
39	5	"Angels and Monsters"	Anthony Hemingway	Adam Armus & Kay Foster	October 13, 2008	8.75
40	6	"Dying of the Light"	Daniel Attias	Chuck Kim & Christopher Zatta	October 20, 2008	8.51
41	7	"Eris Quod Sum"	Jeannot Szwarc	Jesse Alexander	October 27, 2008	8.19
42	8	"Villains"	Allan Arkush	Rob Fresco	November 10, 2008	7.85
43	9	"It's Coming"	Greg Yaitanes	Tim Kring	November 17, 2008	7.65
44	10	"The Eclipse"	Greg Beeman	Aron Eli Coleite & Joe Pokaski	November 24, 2008	7.51
45	11	"The Eclipse"	Holly Dale	Aron Eli Coleite & Joe Pokaski	December 1, 2008	8.00
46	12	"Our Father"	Jeannot Szwarc	Adam Armus & Kay Foster	December 8, 2008	7.72
47	13	"Dual"	Greg Beeman	Jeph Loeb	December 15, 2008	7.87
Volume Four: Fugitives
48	14	"A Clear and Present Danger"	Greg Yaitanes	Tim Kring	February 2, 2009	8.55
49	15	"Trust and Blood"	Allan Arkush	Mark Verheiden	February 9, 2009	7.90
50	16	"Building 26"	Sergio Mimica-Gezzan	Rob Fresco	February 16, 2009	7.74
51	17	"Cold Wars"	Seith Mann	Christopher Zatta and Aron Eli Coleite & Joe Pokaski	February 23, 2009	7.07
52	18	"Exposed"	Eric Laneuville	Adam Armus & Kay Foster	March 2, 2009	7.15
53	19	"Shades of Gray"	Greg Beeman	Oliver Grigsby	March 9, 2009	6.70
54	20	"Cold Snap"	Greg Yaitanes	Bryan Fuller	March 23, 2009	6.47
55	21	"Into Asylum"	Jim Chory	Joe Pokaski	March 30, 2009	6.42
56	22	"Turn and Face the Strange"	Jeannot Szwarc	Rob Fresco & Mark Verheiden	April 6, 2009	6.11
57	23	"1961"	Adam Kane	Aron Eli Coleite	April 13, 2009	6.83
58	24	"I Am Sylar"	Allan Arkush	Adam Armus & Kay Foster	April 20, 2009	6.46
59	25	"An Invisible Thread"	Greg Beeman	Tim Kring	April 27, 2009	6.47

=== Season 4 (2009–10) ===
No. overall	No. in season	Title	Directed by	Written by	Original release date	US viewers (millions)
Volume Five: Redemption
60–61	1–2	"Orientation / "Jump, Push, Fall"	Ed Bianchi & David Straiton	Adam Armus & Kay Foster and Tim Kring	September 21, 2009	5.77
62	3	"Ink"	Roxann Dawson	Aron Eli Coleite	September 28, 2009	5.82
63	4	"Acceptance"	Christopher Misiano	Bryan Fuller	October 5, 2009	5.41
64	5	"Hysterical Blindness"	SJ Clarkson	Joe Pokaski	October 12, 2009	5.64
65	6	"Tabula Rasa"	Jim Chory	Rob Fresco	October 19, 2009	5.67
66	7	"Strange Attractors"	Tucker Gates	Juan Carlos Coto	October 26, 2009	5.86
67	8	"Once Upon a Time in Texas"	Nate Goodman	Aron Eli Coleite & Aury Wallington	November 2, 2009	6.18
68	9	"Shadowboxing"	Jim Chory	Misha Green & Joe Pokaski	November 9, 2009	5.35
69	10	"Brother's Keeper"	Bryan Spicer	Rob Fresco & Mark Verheiden	November 16, 2009	5.07
70	11	"Thanksgiving"	Seith Mann	Adam Armus & Kay Foster	November 23, 2009	5.17
71	12	"The Fifth Stage"	Kevin Dowling	Tim Kring	November 30, 2009	5.90
72	13	"Upon This Rock"	Ron Underwood	Juan Carlos Coto	January 4, 2010	5.30
73	14	"Let It Bleed"	Jeannot Szwarc	Jim Martin	January 4, 2010	4.57
74	15	"Close to You"	Roxann Dawson	Rob Fresco	January 11, 2010	4.71
75	16	"Pass/Fail"	Michael Nankin	Oliver Grigsby	January 18, 2010	3.93
76	17	"The Art of Deception"	SJ Clarkson	Mark Verheiden & Misha Green	January 25, 2010	4.29
77	18	"The Wall"	Allan Arkush	Adam Armus & Kay Foster	February 1, 2010	4.40
78	19	"Brave New World"	Adam Kane	Tim Kring	February 8, 2010	4.41

== Web-based minisodes ==
=== Going Postal ===
No.	Title	Directed by	Written by	Original release date
1	"A Nifty Trick" (Note: A May 2008 press release from NBC gave "Manhunt" as the title of this webisode.)	Yule Caise and Jim Martin	Yule Caise and Jim Martin	July 14, 2008
Two men from the Company confront mail carrier Echo De Mille who discovers his ability to manipulate sound. Echo severely injures one of them in self-defense.
2	"The House Guest"	Yule Caise and Jim Martin	Yule Caise and Jim Martin	July 21, 2008
Echo goes home to protect his girlfriend Gina, but a superpowered man from the Company—the "Constrictor", whom Echo had met earlier—arrives for another showdown with Echo.
3	"Let's Talk"	Yule Caise and Jim Martin	Yule Caise and Jim Martin	July 28, 2008
Echo sends Gina away and confronts those who are targeting him, but things do not go as he had expected.

=== Heroes: Destiny ===
No.	Title	Directed by	Written by	Original release date
1	"Let Us Pray"	Eagle Egilsson	Adam Armus and Kay Foster	November 10, 2008
Santiago discovers his abilities.
2	"Intervention"	Eagle Egilsson	Adam Armus and Kay Foster	November 17, 2008
Believing his powers are divine, Santiago uses them to help people. But when a woman betrays him, he is captured by a secret organization.
3	"Capture"	Eagle Egilsson	Adam Armus and Kay Foster	November 24, 2008
Santiago's captors have a mission for him that he can't refuse.
4	"Escape"	Eagle Egilsson	Adam Armus and Kay Foster	December 1, 2008
Santiago finds freedom in the sanctuary of family.

=== The Recruit ===
No.	Title	Directed by	Written by	Original release date
1	"Private Mills"	Rob Hardy	Timm Keppler and Jim Martin	December 15, 2008
Rachel Mills survives the Pinehearst explosion.
2	"It Was Nothing"	Rob Hardy	Timm Keppler and Jim Martin	December 22, 2008
The squad of marines inject themselves with the serum.
3	"We Do What We Have To Do"	Rob Hardy	Timm Keppler and Jim Martin	December 29, 2008
Angela has a question that haunts Rachel: why did she kill the man she wanted to save?
4	"Day of Reckoning"	Rob Hardy	Timm Keppler and Jim Martin	January 5, 2009
Angela asks about Rachel's mother's death and where Rachel was found after the Pinehearst incident. Rachel relives escaping from Pinehearst, but denies being special.
5	"The Truth Within"	Rob Hardy	Timm Keppler and Jim Martin	January 12, 2009
Rachel is released, armed with a newfound power.
6	"The Whole Story"	Rob Hardy	Timm Keppler and Jim Martin	January 20, 2009
The entire five-part epic of super-soldier Rachel Mills, who survived the explosion of Pinehearst.

=== Hard Knox ===
No.	Title	Directed by	Written by	Original release date
1	"Choices"	Allan Arkush	Rob Fresco	December 22, 2008
Matt Parkman wants street thug Knox to go straight, but it's not so easy.
2	"Get Straight"	Allan Arkush	Rob Fresco	December 22, 2008
Matt Parkman tries to convince Knox to leave gang life, while Knox's crew watches from a distance.
3	"Fear"	Allan Arkush	Rob Fresco	December 29, 2008
Knox's crew leader tries to kill Knox, and Knox finds his abilities to feed off fear and kills the crew leader.
4	"The Main Man Now"	Allan Arkush	Rob Fresco	December 29, 2008
Knox's crew gets a new boss.

=== Nowhere Man ===
No.	Title	Directed by	Written by	Original release date
1	"Puppet Master"	Chris Hanada and Tanner Kling	Timm Keppler	April 20, 2009
With a new identity from Claire, Puppetmaster Eric Doyle tries to settle into a new life by working at Copy Kingdom.
2	"Statement of Character"	Chris Hanada and Tanner Kling	Timm Keppler	April 27, 2009
Doyle's self-control is shattered by his boss.
3	"Pulling the Strings"	Chris Hanada and Tanner Kling	Timm Keppler	May 4, 2009
With his prospects for a normal life fading, Doyle takes matters into his own hands.
4	"A New Beginning"	Chris Hanada and Tanner Kling	Timm Keppler	May 11, 2009
The Puppetmaster ties up loose ends.
5	"The Whole Story"	Chris Hanada and Tanner Kling	Timm Keppler	May 29, 2009
The entire 4 part story.

=== Slow Burn ===
No.	Title	Directed by	Written by	Original release date
1	"Part 1"	Chris Hanada and Tanner Kling	Jim Martin	September 28, 2009
Edgar takes a big risk for Lydia as she reveals a big secret.
2	"Part 2"	Chris Hanada and Tanner Kling	Zach Craley	October 5, 2009
Lydia reaches out to her daughter who reveals she too has a secret. Samuel becomes suspicious.
3	"Part 3"	Chris Hanada and Tanner Kling	Harrison Wilcox	October 12, 2009
Lydia's daughter is in trouble - and so is Edgar.
4	"Part 4"	Chris Hanada and Tanner Kling	Foz McDermott	October 19, 2009
Samuel discovers Lydia has a daughter. Lydia receives an unexpected visitor.
5	"Part 5"	Chris Hanada and Tanner Kling	Jim Martin	October 26, 2009
Lydia talks with her daughter Amanda about her arrival. Amanda shows Caleb her ability.
6	"Part 6"	Chris Hanada and Tanner Kling	Jim Martin	November 2, 2009
Amanda seeks out Samuel with Caleb's help while Lydia seeks out Amanda with Edgar's help.
7	"Part 7"	Chris Hanada and Tanner Kling	Zach Craley	November 9, 2009
As Samuel and Amanda spend some time together, Lydia and Edgar plot to get her back.
8	"Part 8"	Chris Hanada and Tanner Kling	Foz McDermott	November 16, 2009
Samuel Introduces Amanda to the rest of the carnival crew and welcomes her into the family.
9	"Part 9"	Chris Hanada and Tanner Kling	Oliver Grigsby	November 23, 2009
Sent by Samuel to take Amanda from her mother, Caleb pays a terrible price.
10	"Part 10"	Chris Hanada and Tanner Kling	Oliver Grigsby	November 30, 2009
Samuel's plans to separate Amanda from her mother fails, but Amanda chooses to stay anyway.

== Ratings ==
Heroes : U.S. viewers per episode (millions)

Season	Episode number																								
Season	1	2	3	4	5	6	7	8	9	10	11	12	13	14	15	16	17	18	19	20	21	22	23	24	25
1	14.10	12.96	13.34	12.96	14.45	14.89	14.47	15.08	16.03	15.56	14.94	14.90	13.63	14.61	14.68	14.10	14.42	14.90	11.96	11.92	11.14	11.54	13.48	–	
2	16.97	11.96	10.91	11.41	9.44	10.51	9.88	11.16	10.81	11.89	11.06	–													
3	10.09	10.09	9.50	8.20	8.75	8.51	8.19	7.85	7.65	7.51	8.00	7.72	7.87	8.55	7.90	7.74	7.07	7.15	6.70	6.47	6.42	6.11	6.83	6.46	6.47
4	5.77	5.82	5.41	5.64	5.67	5.86	6.18	5.35	5.07	5.17	5.90	5.30	4.57	4.71	3.93	4.29	4.40	4.41	–						

Audience measurement performed by Nielsen Media Research
