= List of Heroes graphic novels =

This is a list of issues of NBC's Heroes webcomic, which supplements the psychological thriller superhero television series of the same name. The comics, which NBC refers to as graphic novels, were made available on their official website each Tuesday as part of the Heroes Evolutions experience, starting with Monsters whose release coincided with the first episode of the show. They ceased publication on June 9, 2010 with the release of From the Files of Primatech, Part 8. Written by the show's writers and drawn by Aspen Comics, they were generally 7-9 pages long, the first page of which is always an advertisement for a vehicle made by Nissan, one of the sponsors for the series. The comics give additional character background and plot information not shown in the television episodes.

WildStorm, a subsidiary of DC Comics released the first 34 chapters in a hardcover volume on November 7, 2007 entitled "Volume One", with a softcover version released later. The collection also includes Tim Sale's artwork as seen on the show. "Volume Two" was released on November 19, 2008, and includes chapters 35-80 bound in a hardcover book.

The comics were available in both PDF and Flash formats; but the NBC page no longer exists. The PDF versions are linked below with archived versions made available via the Wayback Machine where possible. The Flash versions often offered a link to a "hidden surprise", also listed below. A few also had an animated version.

== Season 1 ==
The comics listed here were published during Season One of the show, and continued through the summer preceding Season Two.

| Issue | Title | Release date | Story | Art | Easter egg |
|---|---|---|---|---|---|
| 1 | "Monsters" (PDF). Archived from the original (PDF) on 2006-11-24. (12.0 MB) | 2006-09-25 | Aron Eli Coleite | Michael Turner & Koi Turnbull | Line art for "The Crane". |
| 1 | "Monsters" (PDF). Archived from the original (PDF) on 2006-11-24. (12.0 MB) | Offers background information on Mohinder Suresh, Chandra Suresh and his mysterious death. | | | |
| 2 | "The Crane" (PDF). Archived from the original (PDF) on 2006-11-28. (19.8 MB) | 2006-10-02 | Aron Eli Coleite | Micah Gunnell | Line art for "Trial By Fire". |
| 2 | "The Crane" (PDF). Archived from the original (PDF) on 2006-11-28. (19.8 MB) | Continued from "Don't Look Back". Offers some background on Hiro Nakamura. | | | |
| 3 | "Trial By Fire" (PDF). Archived from the original (PDF) on 2006-11-28. (17.7 MB) | 2006-10-09 | Chuck Kim | Marcus To | Viral campaign video for Nathan Petrelli. |
| 3 | "Trial By Fire" (PDF). Archived from the original (PDF) on 2006-11-28. (17.7 MB) | Nathan Petrelli contemplates his power. | | | |
| 4 | "Aftermath" (PDF). Archived from the original (PDF) on 2009-03-25. (19.3 MB) | 2006-10-16 | Joe Pokaski | Micah Gunnell | Viral MySpace page for Claire Bennet. |
| 4 | "Aftermath" (PDF). Archived from the original (PDF) on 2009-03-25. (19.3 MB) | Continued from "Collision". Details the events after Claire Bennet crashed Brody Mitchum's car and before ambulances arrived. | | | |
| 5 | "Snapshots" (PDF). Archived from the original (PDF) on 2006-11-24. (16.3 MB) | 2006-10-23 | Joe Pokaski | Marcus To | Nissan Versa official website. |
| 5 | "Snapshots" (PDF). Archived from the original (PDF) on 2006-11-24. (16.3 MB) | Provides the backstory of D. L. Hawkins and his escape from jail. | | | |
| 6 | "Stolen Time" (PDF). Archived from the original (PDF) on 2006-12-01. (14.7 MB) | 2006-10-30 | Joe Pokaski | Marcus To | Artwork of Peter Petrelli. |
| 6 | "Stolen Time" (PDF). Archived from the original (PDF) on 2006-12-01. (14.7 MB) | Provides a backstory of how Niki Sanders stole the two million dollars. | | | |
| 7 | "Control" (PDF). (13.3 MB) | 2006-11-06 | Oliver Grigsby | Micah Gunnell | Artwork of Sylar. |
| 7 | "Control" (PDF). (13.3 MB) | Continued from "Nothing to Hide". Features Officer Matt Parkman, and details the effect his mind reading abilities have on his life. | | | |
| 8 | "Isaac's First Time" (PDF). (13.9 MB) | 2006-11-13 | Aron Eli Coleite | Micah Gunnell | Artwork of Hiro Nakamura and Ando Masahashi. |
| 8 | "Isaac's First Time" (PDF). (13.9 MB) | Continued from "Seven Minutes to Midnight". Painter Isaac Mendez talks to Eden McCain about the earliest known manifestation of his ability. | | | |
| 9 | "Life Before Eden" (PDF). (20.0 MB) | 2006-11-20 | Pierluigi Cothran | Marcus To | Behind-the-scenes photo of Hayden Panettiere (Claire Bennet) and Milo Ventimiglia (Peter Petrelli). |
| 9 | "Life Before Eden" (PDF). (20.0 MB) | Details the childhood backstory of Eden McCain. | | | |
| 10 | "Turning Point" (PDF). (12.9 MB) | 2006-11-27 | Christopher Zatta | Micah Gunnell & Marcus To | Behind-the-scenes photo of Clea DuVall (Audrey Hanson) and Greg Grunberg (Matt Parkman). |
| 10 | "Turning Point" (PDF). (12.9 MB) | Details Audrey Hanson's hunt for Sylar. | | | |
| 11 | "Fathers & Daughters" (PDF). Archived from the original (PDF) on 2006-12-06. (13.1 MB) | 2006-12-04 | Andrew Chambliss | Travis Kotzebue & Micah Gunnell | Artwork of Peter Petrelli. |
| 11 | "Fathers & Daughters" (PDF). Archived from the original (PDF) on 2006-12-06. (13.1 MB) | Noah Bennet visits Eden McCain's father to explain her death. | | | |
| 12 | "Super-Heroics" (PDF). (14.3 MB) | 2006-12-11 | Harrison Wilcox | Micah Gunnell | Behind-the-scenes photo of Milo Ventimiglia (Peter Petrelli). |
| 12 | "Super-Heroics" (PDF). (14.3 MB) | Peter Petrelli dreams while in a coma. | | | |
| 13 | "Wireless, Part 1" (PDF). Archived from the original (PDF) on 2007-02-12. (17.0 MB) | 2006-12-25 | Aron Eli Coleite | Micah Gunnell & Phil Jimenez (Guest) | Behind-the-scenes photo of Milo Ventimiglia (Peter Petrelli) and Hayden Panettiere (Claire Bennet). |
| 13 | "Wireless, Part 1" (PDF). Archived from the original (PDF) on 2007-02-12. (17.0 MB) | Introduces a new character, Hana Gitelman. | | | |
| 14 | "Wireless, Part 2" (PDF). (17.4 MB) | 2007-01-01 | Aron Eli Coleite & Joe Pokaski | Micah Gunnell | Behind-the-scenes photo of Adrian Pasdar (Nathan Petrelli) and Milo Ventimiglia (Peter Petrelli). Visually identical to the following easter egg, albeit the file size is slightly higher. |
| 14 | "Wireless, Part 2" (PDF). (17.4 MB) | Noah Bennet gives Hana Gitelman an opportunity. | | | |
| 15 | "Wireless, Part 3" (PDF). (12.8 MB) | 2007-01-08 | Aron Eli Coleite & Joe Pokaski | Micah Gunnell | Behind-the-scenes photo of Adrian Pasdar (Nathan Petrelli) and Milo Ventimiglia (Peter Petrelli). Visually identical to the previous easter egg, albeit the file size is slightly lower. |
| 15 | "Wireless, Part 3" (PDF). (12.8 MB) | Hana Gitelman attempts her first mission for Noah Bennet. | | | |
| 16 | "Wireless, Part 4" (PDF). (12.3 MB) | 2007-01-16 | Aron Eli Coleite & Joe Pokaski | Micah Gunnell | Photo of Ali Larter (Niki Sanders), Masi Oka (Hiro Nakamura), Greg Grunberg (Matt Parkman), Milo Ventimiglia (Peter Petrelli), Hayden Panettiere (Claire Bennet), Adrian Pasdar (Nathan Petrelli) and Sendhil Ramamurthy (Mohinder Suresh) at the 64th Golden Globe Awards. |
| 16 | "Wireless, Part 4" (PDF). (12.3 MB) | A captive Hana Gitelman discovers a lie and makes a life changing decision. | | | |
| 17 | "How Do You Stop an Exploding Man?, Part 1" (PDF). (15.3 MB) | 2007-01-22 | Jesse Alexander & Aron Eli Coleite | Travis Kotzebue | Behind-the-scenes photo of Santiago Cabrera (Isaac Mendez) pinned to the floor. |
| 17 | "How Do You Stop an Exploding Man?, Part 1" (PDF). (15.3 MB) | Ted Sprague meets someone who wants to help. | | | |
| 18 | "How Do You Stop an Exploding Man?, Part 2" (PDF). (14.0 MB) | 2007-01-29 | Jesse Alexander & Aron Eli Coleite | Jordan Kotzebue | Behind-the-scenes photo of George Takei (Kaito Nakamura) and Masi Oka (Hiro Nakamura). |
| 18 | "How Do You Stop an Exploding Man?, Part 2" (PDF). (14.0 MB) | Ted Sprague escapes from his would-be captors and goes looking for answers. | | | |
| 19 | "Bully" (PDF). (10.9 MB) | 2007-02-06 | Chuck Kim | Micah Gunnell | Behind-the-scenes photo of Masi Oka (Hiro Nakamura) with the sword. |
| 19 | "Bully" (PDF). (10.9 MB) | Micah Sanders has a brief confrontation with a school punk. | | | |
| 20 | "Road Kill" (PDF). (14.1 MB) | 2007-02-13 | Joe Pokaski | Jason Badower | Behind-the-scenes photo of Jack Coleman (Noah Bennet) standing before Sylar's cell. |
| 20 | "Road Kill" (PDF). (14.1 MB) | Sylar searches for more potential victims and abilities. | | | |
| 21 | "The Path of the Righteous" (PDF). (6.98 MB) | 2007-02-20 | Aron Eli Coleite | Staz Johnson | Behind-the-scenes photo of Ali Larter (Niki Sanders) in a padded cell. |
| 21 | "The Path of the Righteous" (PDF). (6.98 MB) | Hana Gitelman leaves Ted Sprague and Matt Parkman to follow a different path. | | | |
| 22 | "Hell's Angel" (PDF). (3.95 MB) | 2007-02-27 | Jesse Alexander | Michael Gaydos | Behind-the-scenes photo of a crew member showing Greg Grunberg (Matt Parkman) a prop gun. |
| 22 | "Hell's Angel" (PDF). (3.95 MB) | 14 years in the past, Noah Bennet goes on a routine mission to find someone special. | | | |
| 23 | "Family Man" (PDF). Archived from the original (PDF) on 2007-03-08. (4.26 MB) | 2007-03-06 | Jesse Alexander | Staz Johnson | Viral blog for Hana Gitelman. |
| 23 | "Family Man" (PDF). Archived from the original (PDF) on 2007-03-08. (4.26 MB) | Noah Bennet turns his back on his employer to protect his family. | | | |
| 24 | "War Buddies, Part 1: The Lonestar File" (PDF). (4.97 MB) | 2007-03-13 | Mark Warshaw | Steven Lejeune | Viral blog for Hana Gitelman. |
| 24 | "War Buddies, Part 1: The Lonestar File" (PDF). (4.97 MB) | Hana Gitelman's search for answers takes her to Washington, D.C. | | | |
| 25 | "War Buddies, Part 2: Unknown Soldiers" (PDF). (15.2 MB) | 2007-03-19 | Andrew Chambliss & Pierluigi Cothran | Adam Archer | Behind the scenes photo of Isaac Mendez' loft. |
| 25 | "War Buddies, Part 2: Unknown Soldiers" (PDF). (15.2 MB) | Hana Gitelman reads a report from a classified mission during the Vietnam War. | | | |
| 26 | "War Buddies, Part 3: Unknown Soldiers" (PDF). (16.3 MB) | 2007-03-26 | DJ Doyle | Adam Archer | Behind the scenes photo of Ali Larter (Niki Sanders) and Malcolm McDowell (Daniel Linderman). |
| 26 | "War Buddies, Part 3: Unknown Soldiers" (PDF). (16.3 MB) | Dallas and Austin try to find the downed plane. | | | |
| 27 | "War Buddies, Part 4: No Turning Back" (PDF). (17.5 MB) | 2007-04-03 | Timm Keppler | Jason Badower | Behind-the-scenes photo of Sendhil Ramamurthy (Mohinder Suresh) and Zachary Quinto (Sylar). |
| 27 | "War Buddies, Part 4: No Turning Back" (PDF). (17.5 MB) | Dallas and Austin learn the secret of Au Co. | | | |
| 28 | "War Buddies, Part 5: Introductions" (PDF). (16.1 MB) | 2007-04-09 | Harrison Wilcox & Oliver Grigsby | Jason Badower | Behind-the-scenes photo of Malcolm McDowell (Daniel Linderman). |
| 28 | "War Buddies, Part 5: Introductions" (PDF). (16.1 MB) | Dallas' and Austin's identities are revealed. | | | |
| 29 | "War Buddies, Part 6: Call to Arms" (PDF). (22.6 MB) | 2007-04-16 | Mark Warshaw | Staz Johnson | Viral blog for Hana Gitelman. |
| 29 | "War Buddies, Part 6: Call to Arms" (PDF). (22.6 MB) | Hana Gitelman uncovers a political plot. | | | |
| 30 | "String Theory" (PDF). (24.0 MB) | 2007-04-23 | Joe Pokaski | Staz Johnson | Previous chapter's final page in higher quality and without text boxes. PDF (41.6 MB) |
| 30 | "String Theory" (PDF). (24.0 MB) | Future Hiro recounts the time before, during and after he delivered his fateful message to Peter Petrelli: "Save the Cheerleader, Save the World". | | | |
| 31 | "Walls, Part 1" (PDF). (17.3 MB) | 2007-05-01 | Joe Pokaski | Tom Grummett | Behind-the-scenes photo of Hayden Panettiere (Claire Bennet). |
| 31 | "Walls, Part 1" (PDF). (17.3 MB) | In the future, Hiro Nakamura and Peter Petrelli break Niki Sanders out of prison. | | | |
| 32 | "Walls, Part 2" (PDF). Archived from the original (PDF) on 2007-10-24. (12.3 MB) | 2007-05-08 | Joe Pokaski | Michael Gaydos | Behind-the-scenes photo of Zachary Quinto (Sylar) and Ellen Greene (Virginia Gray). |
| 32 | "Walls, Part 2" (PDF). Archived from the original (PDF) on 2007-10-24. (12.3 MB) | Hiro Nakamura, Peter Petrelli and Niki Sanders fight the opposing heroes at the prison. Niki Sanders thinks about her life before and after the bomb. | | | |
| 33 | "The Death of Hana Gitelman, Part 1" (PDF). Archived from the original (PDF) on 2007-10-24. (24.3 MB) | 2007-05-15 | Aron Eli Coleite | Jason Badower | Behind-the-scenes photo of Milo Ventimiglia (Peter Petrelli) and Hayden Panettiere (Claire Bennet). |
| 33 | "The Death of Hana Gitelman, Part 1" (PDF). Archived from the original (PDF) on 2007-10-24. (24.3 MB) | Hana Gitelman undertakes a mission to disable a tracking system. | | | |
| 34 | "The Death of Hana Gitelman, Part 2" (PDF). (23.2 MB) | 2007-05-22 | Aron Eli Coleite | Jason Badower | Behind-the-scenes photo of Hayden Panettiere (Claire Bennet). |
| 34 | "The Death of Hana Gitelman, Part 2" (PDF). (23.2 MB) | Hana Gitelman continues her mission, while combatting multiple threats on her life. | | | |
| 35 | "It Takes a Village, Part 1" (PDF). Archived from the original (PDF) on 2007-10-24. (16.8 MB) | 2007-05-29 | Joe Kelly | Michael Gaydos | Behind-the-scenes photo of Milo Ventimiglia (Peter Petrelli), Adrian Pasdar (Nathan Petrelli) and Hayden Panettiere (Claire Bennet). |
| 35 | "It Takes a Village, Part 1" (PDF). Archived from the original (PDF) on 2007-10-24. (16.8 MB) | The Haitian remembers his father and childhood in Haiti. | | | |
| 36 | "It Takes a Village, Part 2" (PDF). (19.2 MB) | 2007-06-05 | Joe Kelly | Staz Johnson | Behind-the-scenes photo of Ali Larter (Niki Sanders) and Hayden Panettiere (Claire Bennet). |
| 36 | "It Takes a Village, Part 2" (PDF). (19.2 MB) | The Haitian recalls the first time he used his powers. | | | |
| 37 | "It Takes a Village, Part 3" (PDF). (18.5 MB) | 2007-06-12 | Joe Kelly | Tom Grummett | Behind-the-scenes photo of Jack Coleman (Noah Bennet) and Jimmy Jean-Louis (the Haitian). |
| 37 | "It Takes a Village, Part 3" (PDF). (18.5 MB) | The Haitian and his father go on a journey to perform a penance. | | | |
| 38 | "It Takes a Village, Part 4" (PDF). (21.9 MB) | 2007-06-19 | Joe Kelly | Staz Johnson | Behind-the-scenes photo of Ali Larter (Niki Sanders). |
| 38 | "It Takes a Village, Part 4" (PDF). (21.9 MB) | The Haitian learns the price of his mistakes. | | | |
| 39 | "Betty, Part 1" (PDF). (17.5 MB) | 2007-06-27 | Joe Casey | Ryan Odagawa | Behind-the-scenes photo of Sendhil Ramamurthy (Mohinder Suresh) and Greg Grunberg (Matt Parkman). |
| 39 | "Betty, Part 1" (PDF). (17.5 MB) | A hero learns about her powers. | | | |
| 40 | "Betty, Part 2" (PDF). (18.2 MB) | 2007-07-03 | Joe Casey | Ryan Odagawa | Behind-the-scenes photo of Jack Coleman (Noah Bennet) and Hayden Panettiere (Claire Bennet). |
| 40 | "Betty, Part 2" (PDF). (18.2 MB) | Betty uses her powers on the students. | | | |
| 41 | "Betty, Part 3" (PDF). (13.6 MB) | 2007-07-10 | Joe Casey | Ryan Odagawa | Behind-the-scenes photo of Milo Ventimiglia (Peter Petrelli). |
| 41 | "Betty, Part 3" (PDF). (13.6 MB) | Betty's actions have unexpected consequences. | | | |
| 42 | "Betty, Part 4" (PDF). (17.3 MB) | 2007-07-17 | Joe Casey | Ryan Odagawa | Behind-the-scenes photo of Masi Oka (Hiro Nakamura). |
| 42 | "Betty, Part 4" (PDF). (17.3 MB) | Betty decides to take revenge. | | | |
| 43 | "Golden Handshake, Part 1: Man Overboard" (PDF). (14.5 MB) | 2007-07-24 | Steven T. Seagle & Duncan Rouleau | Michael Gaydos | Behind-the-scenes photo of Hayden Panettiere (Claire Bennet) and Jack Coleman (Noah Bennet). |
| 43 | "Golden Handshake, Part 1: Man Overboard" (PDF). (14.5 MB) | An old case featuring Haram, the first partner of Claude, the invisible man. | | | |
| 44 | "Golden Handshake, Part 2: An American in Paris" (PDF). (16.9 MB) | 2007-07-31 | Steven T. Seagle & Duncan Rouleau | Tom Grummett | Behind-the-scenes photo of Masi Oka (Hiro Nakamura). |
| 44 | "Golden Handshake, Part 2: An American in Paris" (PDF). (16.9 MB) | Claude and Haram get closer to their suspect. | | | |
| 45 | "Golden Handshake, Part 3: One More for the Road" (PDF). (18.6 MB) | 2007-08-07 | Steven T. Seagle & Duncan Rouleau | Michael Gaydos | Behind-the-scenes photo of Zachary Quinto (Sylar) and Ellen Greene (Virginia Gray). |
| 45 | "Golden Handshake, Part 3: One More for the Road" (PDF). (18.6 MB) | The real perpetrator tries to escape. | | | |
| 46 | "Golden Handshake, Part 4: Severance Pay" (PDF). (14.9 MB) | 2007-08-14 | Steven T. Seagle & Duncan Rouleau | Michael Gaydos | Behind-the-scenes photo of Masi Oka (Hiro Nakamura). |
| 46 | "Golden Handshake, Part 4: Severance Pay" (PDF). (14.9 MB) | The chase ends with a dangerous fight. | | | |
| 47 | "Heroism Is Found in the Heart, Part 1" (PDF). Archived from the original (PDF) on 2008-03-19. (15.2 MB) | 2007-08-21 | Christopher Zatta | Ryan Odagawa | Behind-the-scenes photo of Missi Pyle (Hope). |
| 47 | "Heroism Is Found in the Heart, Part 1" (PDF). Archived from the original (PDF) on 2008-03-19. (15.2 MB) | Ando Masahashi seeks Hiro Nakamura's sister's affections. | | | |
| 48 | "Heroism Is Found in the Heart, Part 2" (PDF). Archived from the original (PDF) on 2008-03-19. (14.7 MB) | 2007-08-28 | Christopher Zatta | Ryan Odagawa | Promotional image of Saemi Nakamura (Kimiko Nakamura). |
| 48 | "Heroism Is Found in the Heart, Part 2" (PDF). Archived from the original (PDF) on 2008-03-19. (14.7 MB) | Ando Masahashi tries to protect Kimiko Nakamura. | | | |
| 49 | "Blackout, Part 1" (PDF). (12.0 MB) | 2007-09-04 | Mark Sable | Jason Badower | Behind-the-scenes photo of Sendhil Ramamurthy (Mohinder Suresh) and Adair Tishler (Molly Walker). |
| 49 | "Blackout, Part 1" (PDF). (12.0 MB) | Mohinder Suresh travels to a hospital in search of support for carrying on his father's research. | | | |
| 50 | "Blackout, Part 2" (PDF). (10.9 MB) | 2007-09-11 | Mark Sable | Jason Badower | Behind-the-scenes photo of Erick Avari (Chandra Suresh). |
| 50 | "Blackout, Part 2" (PDF). (10.9 MB) | Mohinder Suresh finds the source of the blackouts. | | | |
| 51 | "Maya y Alejandro" (PDF). (15.4 MB) | 2007-09-18 | Mark Warshaw | Ryan Odagawa | Behind-the-scenes photo of Santiago Cabrera (Isaac Mendez) and Tawny Cypress (Simone Deveaux). |
| 51 | "Maya y Alejandro" (PDF). (15.4 MB) | Two new characters are wanted for murder. | | | |

== Season 2 ==
The comics listed here were published during Season Two of the show, and continued through the summer preceding Season Three.

| Issue | Title | Release date | Story | Art | Easter egg |
|---|---|---|---|---|---|
| 52 | "Flying Blind" (PDF). (19.8 MB) | 2007-09-25 | Christine Boylan | Tom Grummett | Behind-the-scenes photo of Masi Oka (Hiro Nakamura) and David Anders (Takezo Kensei). |
| 52 | "Flying Blind" (PDF). (19.8 MB) | Introduction to West Rosen, a classmate of Claire Bennet's at Costa Verde High School. | | | |
| 53 | "The Crossroads" (PDF). (14.1 MB) | 2007-10-02 | Joe Kelly | Michael Gaydos | Behind-the-scenes photo of Lestat (Mr. Muggles). |
| 53 | "The Crossroads" (PDF). (14.1 MB) | Continues from "Lizards". What the Haitian did before leaving Haiti. | | | |
| 54 | "Petrified Lightning" (PDF). (17.0 MB) | 2007-10-09 | Christine Boylan | Michael Gaydos | Behind-the-scenes photo of Milo Ventimiglia (Peter Petrelli) and Katie Carr (Caitlin). |
| 54 | "Petrified Lightning" (PDF). (17.0 MB) | Peter Petrelli learns the tale of Cúchulainn. | | | |
| Bonus | "The Rogue" (PDF). (12.0 MB) | 2007-10-15 | Mark Warshaw | Ryan Odagawa | http://www.nbc.com/Heroes/novels/downloads/rogue_ee.jpg |
| Bonus | "The Rogue" (PDF). (12.0 MB) | Derek steals Claire Bennet's car and drives to Mexico. | | | |
| 55 | "The Trial of the Black Bear" (PDF). (16.7 MB) | 2007-10-16 | Chuck Kim | Tom Grummett | Behind-the-scenes photo of David Anders (Takezo Kensei). |
| 55 | "The Trial of the Black Bear" (PDF). (16.7 MB) | Takezo Kensei and Hiro Nakamura try to obtain a scroll from the Black Bear of Sakashita. | | | |
| 56 | "Molly's Dream" (PDF). (15.1 MB) | 2007-10-23 | Harrison Wilcox | Ryan Odagawa | Behind-the-scenes photo of Adrian Pasdar (Nathan Petrelli). |
| 56 | "Molly's Dream" (PDF). (15.1 MB) | An exploration through one of Molly Walker's comatose nightmares. | | | |
| 57 | "Team Building Exercise" (PDF). (15.1 MB) | 2007-10-30 | Pierluigi Cothran | Travis Kotzebue | Behind-the-scenes photo of Hayden Panettiere (Claire Bennet). |
| 57 | "Team Building Exercise" (PDF). (15.1 MB) | Noah Bennet's first "bag and tag" mission with the Company. | | | |
| Interactive Novel | The Last Shangri-La | 2007-11-04 | Yule Caise | Ryan Odagawa | None. |
| Interactive Novel | The Last Shangri-La | Hana Gitelman sends an associate to Bhutan in search of a long-lost relative. Continuing events from Heroes Evolutions, this is the first graphic novel presented exclusively in Flash. | | | |
| 58 | "Quarantine" (PDF). (15.6 MB) | 2007-11-06 | Jim Martin | Marcus To | Behind-the-scenes photo of Sendhil Ramamurthy (Mohinder Suresh) and Ali Larter (Niki Sanders). |
| 58 | "Quarantine" (PDF). (15.6 MB) | Homeland Security official Howard Lemay deals with the devastation of the Shanti virus. | | | |
| 59 | "Man on Fire" (PDF). (15.4 MB) | 2007-11-13 | Timm Keppler | Michael Gaydos | Behind-the-scenes photo of Greg Grunberg (Matt Parkman) with a cello. |
| 59 | "Man on Fire" (PDF). (15.4 MB) | D. L. Hawkins becomes a different kind of hero. | | | |
| 60 | "Revolutionary War, Part 1: Pursuit" (PDF). (20.1 MB) | 2007-11-20 | DJ Doyle | Tom Grummett | Behind-the-scenes photo of Milo Ventimiglia (Peter Petrelli) and Adrian Pasdar (Nathan Petrelli). |
| 60 | "Revolutionary War, Part 1: Pursuit" (PDF). (20.1 MB) | Adam Monroe meets his match. | | | |
| 61 | "Revolutionary War, Part 2: Pursuit" (PDF). (18.7 MB) | 2007-11-27 | Oliver Grigsby | Tom Grummett | Behind-the-scenes photo of Takezo Kensei's armor. |
| 61 | "Revolutionary War, Part 2: Pursuit" (PDF). (18.7 MB) | Adam Monroe learns a lesson from Evan. | | | |
| 62 | "Special" (PDF). (15.5 MB) | 2007-12-04 | Joe Pokaski | Michael Gaydos | Behind-the-scenes photo of Hayden Panettiere (Claire Bennet) holding a photo of Nicholas D'Agosto (West Rosen) as a child. |
| 62 | "Special" (PDF). (15.5 MB) | The backstory behind West Rosen's abduction as a child by Noah Bennet and the Haitian. | | | |
| 63 | "Elle's First Assignment, Part 1" (PDF). (17.0 MB) | 2007-12-11 | Chuck Kim | Ryan Odagawa | Behind-the-scenes photo of Kristen Bell (Elle Bishop) after being shot in the arm. |
| 63 | "Elle's First Assignment, Part 1" (PDF). (17.0 MB) | Elle Bishop's first assignment from the Company. | | | |
| 64 | "Elle's First Assignment, Part 2" (PDF). (19.3 MB) | 2007-12-18 | Chuck Kim | Ryan Odagawa | Behind-the-scenes photo of Jack Coleman (Noah Bennet) and Nora Zehetner (Eden McCain). |
| 64 | "Elle's First Assignment, Part 2" (PDF). (19.3 MB) | Elle Bishop continues her assignment from the Company. | | | |
| 65 | "Normal Lives" (PDF). (15.6 MB) | 2007-12-25 | Chuck Kim | Micah Gunnell | Behind-the-scenes photo of Jack Coleman (Noah Bennet) and Hayden Panettiere (Claire Bennet). |
| 65 | "Normal Lives" (PDF). (15.6 MB) | Noah Bennet tries to live a normal life. | | | |
| 66 | "The Ten Brides of Takezo Kensei" (PDF). Archived from the original (PDF) on 2008-03-19. (13.9 MB) | 2007-12-31 | Chuck Kim | Peter Steigerwald | Behind-the-scenes photo of David Anders (Adam Monroe). |
| 66 | "The Ten Brides of Takezo Kensei" (PDF). Archived from the original (PDF) on 2008-03-19. (13.9 MB) | While buried alive, Adam Monroe recounts the many loves he has after Yaeko. | | | |
| 67 | "The Golden Goose" (PDF). (13.4 MB) | 2008-01-08 | John O'Hara | Michael Gaydos | Behind-the-scenes photo of Stephen Tobolowsky (Bob Bishop). |
| 67 | "The Golden Goose" (PDF). (13.4 MB) | In Bhutan, Richard Drucker's old pilot gets a visitor. | | | |
| 68 | "The Man with Too Much Brains" (PDF). (21.4 MB) | 2008-01-15 | Carrie Wagner and John O'Hara | Tom Grummett | Behind-the-scenes photo of Milo Ventimiglia (Peter Petrelli) and Kristen Bell (Elle Bishop). |
| 68 | "The Man with Too Much Brains" (PDF). (21.4 MB) | Introduces Matt Neuenberg, a high school outcast with a unique gift of memory. | | | |
| 69 | "Hana and Drucker's Plot Discovered" (PDF). (23.1 MB) | 2008-01-22 | R.D. Hall | Tom Grummett | Behind-the-scenes photo of Kristen Bell (Elle Bishop). |
| 69 | "Hana and Drucker's Plot Discovered" (PDF). (23.1 MB) | Matt Neuenberg finds mysterious data from Bhutan. | | | |
| 70 | "The End of Hana and Drucker" (PDF). (23.6 MB) | 2008-01-29 | R.D. Hall | Tom Grummett | Behind-the-scenes photo of Greg Grunberg (Matt Parkman) and Jack Coleman (Noah Bennet). |
| 70 | "The End of Hana and Drucker" (PDF). (23.6 MB) | Matt Neuenberg is forced to download the entire Company database into his memory in order to protect them from Hana and Drucker. | | | |
| 71 | "History of a Secret" (PDF). Archived from the original (PDF) on 2008-03-19. (12.1 MB) | 2008-02-05 | John O'Hara and Carrie Wagner | Micah Gunnell | Behind-the-scenes photo of Lestat (Mr. Muggles). |
| 71 | "History of a Secret" (PDF). Archived from the original (PDF) on 2008-03-19. (12.1 MB) | A young man's destiny comes calling with an ancient secret. | | | |
| 72 | "Past Experience" (PDF). Archived from the original (PDF) on 2011-06-29. (14 MB) | 2008-02-11 | J.T. Krul | Jason Badower | Behind-the-scenes photo of Masi Oka (Hiro Nakamura) and George Takei (Kaito Nakamura). |
| 72 | "Past Experience" (PDF). Archived from the original (PDF) on 2011-06-29. (14 MB) | Kimiko Nakamura learns the lesson from a story told by her father. | | | |
| 73 | "War Buddies, Part 7: Coming Home" (PDF). (14.9 MB) | 2008-02-18 | John O'Hara | Micah Gunnell | Behind-the-scenes photo of Malcolm McDowell (Linderman). |
| 73 | "War Buddies, Part 7: Coming Home" (PDF). (14.9 MB) | Linderman comes home from Vietnam and meets a woman. | | | |
| 74 | "Blindsided" (PDF). Archived from the original (PDF) on 2008-09-23. (11.9 MB) | 2008-02-25 | Joe Pokaski | Michael Gaydos | Behind-the-scenes photo of Jimmy Jean-Louis (The Haitian), Kristen Bell (Elle Bishop) and Milo Ventimiglia (Peter Petrelli). |
| 74 | "Blindsided" (PDF). Archived from the original (PDF) on 2008-09-23. (11.9 MB) | Noah Bennet once had perfect vision. One day, he becomes a man in need of glasses. | | | |
| 75 | "A Lesson in Electricity" (PDF). (17.25 MB) | 2008-03-03 | David Wohl | Micah Gunnell | Behind-the-scenes photo of Ali Larter (Niki Sanders) and Noah Gray-Cabey (Micah Sanders). |
| 75 | "A Lesson in Electricity" (PDF). (17.25 MB) | Another account of Benjamin Franklin's kite experiment. | | | |
| 76 | "Pieces of Me" (PDF). (17.71 MB) | 2008-03-11 | J.T. Krul | Robert Atkins | Behind-the-scenes photo of Zachary Quinto (Sylar) and Hayden Panettiere (Claire Bennet). |
| 76 | "Pieces of Me" (PDF). (17.71 MB) | Ryan Covington experiences a recurring dream. | | | |
| 77 | "On the Lam" (PDF). (22.9 MB) | 2008-03-18 | J.T. Krul | Eric Nguyen | Photo of Malcolm McDowell (Linderman), Brian and 2 associates. |
| 77 | "On the Lam" (PDF). (22.9 MB) | Brian, blogger of brianundaunted on IMEEM, recounts life on the run from Linderman. | | | |
| 78 | "Bounty Hunter" (PDF). (17.14 MB) | 2008-03-25 | R.D. Hall | Robert Atkins | Photo of Adrian Pasdar (Nathan Petrelli). |
| 78 | "Bounty Hunter" (PDF). (17.14 MB) | Focuses on Linda Tavara and how she got her notebook. | | | |
| 79 | "Different and the Same" (PDF). (15.4 MB) | 2008-03-31 | J.T. Krul | Micah Gunnell | Photo of Jimmy Jean-Louis (The Haitian). |
| 79 | "Different and the Same" (PDF). (15.4 MB) | Piper learns the truth from her dreams. | | | |
| 80 | "Moonlight Serenade" (PDF). (15.4 MB) | 2008-04-08 | R.D. Hall | Jason Badower | Behind-the-scenes photo of Jack Coleman (Noah Bennet) and Zachary Quinto (Sylar). |
| 80 | "Moonlight Serenade" (PDF). (15.4 MB) | Linda learns her deadly ability. | | | |
| 81 | "Donna's Big Date, Part 1" (PDF). (16.1 MB) | 2008-04-15 | Chuck Kim | Peter Steigerwald | Behind-the-scenes photo of Hayden Panettiere (Claire Bennet). |
| 81 | "Donna's Big Date, Part 1" (PDF). (16.1 MB) | Donna Dunlap has a date with the Company. | | | |
| 82 | "Donna's Big Date, Part 2: Replay" (PDF). (15.1 MB) | 2008-04-21 | Chuck Kim | Peter Steigerwald | Behind-the-scenes photo of Dania Ramírez (Maya Herrera). |
| 82 | "Donna's Big Date, Part 2: Replay" (PDF). (15.1 MB) | Donna learns more about the Company. | | | |
| 83 | "Career Choices" (PDF). (15.4 MB) | 2008-04-28 | Chuck Kim | Michael Gaydos | Behind-the-scenes photo of Eric Roberts (Thompson). |
| 83 | "Career Choices" (PDF). (15.4 MB) | As her first assignment looms, Donna continues to be taken by surprise. | | | |
| 84 | "Trust Issues, Part 1" (PDF). (15.9 MB) | 2008-05-05 | DJ Doyle | Robert Atkins | An artistic rendering of Donna Dunlap. |
| 84 | "Trust Issues, Part 1" (PDF). (15.9 MB) | The younger Thompson tries to figure out what's wrong within the company. | | | |
| 85 | "Trust Issues, Part 2" (PDF). (13.9 MB) | 2008-05-12 | DJ Doyle | Robert Atkins | Behind-the-scenes photo of Stephen Tobolowsky (Bob Bishop) and Sendhil Ramamurthy (Mohinder Suresh). |
| 85 | "Trust Issues, Part 2" (PDF). (13.9 MB) | An unsure Donna copes with being a double agent, and tries to decide her next move. | | | |
| 86 | "Faces, Part 1" (PDF). (19.1 MB) | 2008-05-19 | Mark Sable | Alitha Martinez | Behind-the-scenes photo of Rachel Kimsey (Candice/Michelle). |
| 86 | "Faces, Part 1" (PDF). (19.1 MB) | An agent with an unattractive look is paired up with her face changing mother | | | |
| 87 | "Faces, Part 2" (PDF). (14.1 MB) | 2008-05-26 | Mark Sable | Micah Gunnell | Behind-the-scenes photo of Cristine Rose (Angela Petrelli). |
| 87 | "Faces, Part 2" (PDF). (14.1 MB) | The aftermath of sleeping with a fellow agent. | | | |
| 88 | "Root and Branch, Part 1: The Big Bag and Tag" (PDF). (13.6 MB) | 2008-06-02 | Oliver Grigsby | Jason Badower | Behind-the-scenes photo of James Kyson Lee (Ando Masahashi). |
| 88 | "Root and Branch, Part 1: The Big Bag and Tag" (PDF). (13.6 MB) | A bag and tag mission involving a man's duplicates. | | | |
| 89 | "Root and Branch, Part 2: Weeding Out" (PDF). (14.5 MB) | 2008-06-10 | Zach Craley | Jason Badower | Behind-the-scenes photo of Hiro's time-line in Isaac Mendez's apartment. |
| 89 | "Root and Branch, Part 2: Weeding Out" (PDF). (14.5 MB) | The result of the bag and tag mission with the clones. | | | |
| 90 | "Root and Branch, Part 3: Extraction" (PDF). (16.5 MB) | 2008-06-16 | Zach Craley & Oliver Grigsby | Jason Badower | Scene from Company Man of Christopher Eccleston (Claude) and Jack Coleman (Noah Bennet) on the bridge. |
| 90 | "Root and Branch, Part 3: Extraction" (PDF). (16.5 MB) | Agent Sabine Hazel helps Julien Dumont escape. | | | |
| 91 | "Berlin, Part 1" (PDF). (18.6 MB) | 2008-06-23 | Christopher Zatta | Alitha Martinez | Photo of Dana Davis (Monica Dawson). |
| 91 | "Berlin, Part 1" (PDF). (18.6 MB) | In the search for Evs Dropper, the company begins by investigating every agent with a special ability | | | |
| 92 | "Berlin, Part 2" (PDF). (18.6 MB) | 2008-07-01 | Christopher Zatta | Alitha Martinez | Behind-the-scenes photo of Masi Oka (Hiro Nakamura) from Powerless. |
| 92 | "Berlin, Part 2" (PDF). (18.6 MB) | The search for Evs Dropper continues with a surprise attack. | | | |
| 93 | "The Kill Squad, Part 1" (PDF). (16.7 MB) | 2008-07-07 | Harrison Wilcox | Michael Gaydos | Behind the scenes photo of Missy Peregrym (Candice Wilmer). |
| 93 | "The Kill Squad, Part 1" (PDF). (16.7 MB) | Donna and Thompson go to West Virginia on a bag and tag mission with a Company support team. | | | |
| 94 | "The Kill Squad, Part 2" (PDF). (15.6 MB) | 2008-07-14 | Harrison Wilcox | Michael Gaydos | Behind the scenes photo of Zachary Quinto (Sylar). |
| 94 | "The Kill Squad, Part 2" (PDF). (15.6 MB) | The result of the bag and tag mission. | | | |
| 95 | "The Kill Squad, Part 3" (PDF). (17.0 MB) | 2008-07-22 | Harrison Wilcox | Micah Gunnell | Photo of Leonard Roberts (D. L. Hawkins), Ali Larter (Niki Sanders) and Noah Gray-Cabey (Micah Sanders). |
| 95 | "The Kill Squad, Part 3" (PDF). (17.0 MB) | Gael gives Fallon his own Kill Squad, and a new mission involving a relative of a family of Heroes. | | | |
| 96 | "Going Postal" (PDF). (18.4 MB) | 2008-07-29 | Yule Caise | Marcus To | Photo of Jack Coleman (Noah Bennet), Jimmy Jean-Louis (The Haitian) and Nora Zehetner (Eden McCain). |
| 96 | "Going Postal" (PDF). (18.4 MB) | The events that led to the capture of Echo DeMille by The Company. | | | |
| 97 | "Our Lady of Blessed Acceleration, Part 1" (PDF). (14.9 MB) | 2008-08-04 | Zach Craley | Micah Gunnell | Photo of Brea Grant (Daphne Millbrook) and Masi Oka (Hiro Nakamura). |
| 97 | "Our Lady of Blessed Acceleration, Part 1" (PDF). (14.9 MB) | Two months before Evs Dropper infiltrated The Company, we are introduced to new hero Daphne Millbrook. | | | |
| 98 | "Our Lady of Blessed Acceleration, Part 2" (PDF). (14.6 MB) | 2008-08-11 | Zach Craley | Micah Gunnell | Photo of Ali Larter (Niki Sanders). |
| 98 | "Our Lady of Blessed Acceleration, Part 2" (PDF). (14.6 MB) | Daphne Millbrook travels to Japan to take on a heist at Yamagato Industries. | | | |
| 99 | "Hindsight" (PDF). (18.1 MB) | 2008-08-18 | Oliver Grigsby | Alitha Martinez | Scene from The Line of Elya Baskin (Ivan Spector) . |
| 99 | "Hindsight" (PDF). (18.1 MB) | Gael confronts Donna over her links to Evs Dropper. | | | |
| 100 | "Foresight" (PDF). (16.2 MB) | 2008-08-25 | Zach Craley | Alitha Martinez | Behind the scenes photo of Greg Grunberg (Matt Parkman). |
| 100 | "Foresight" (PDF). (16.2 MB) | Donna and Thompson try to find Evs Dropper | | | |
| 101 | "Into the Wild, Part 1" (PDF). (14.9 MB) | 2008-09-01 | Timm Keppler and Jim Martin | Jason Badower | Behind the scenes photo of Hayden Panettiere (Claire Bennet) and Adrian Pasdar (Nathan Petrelli). |
| 101 | "Into the Wild, Part 1" (PDF). (14.9 MB) | The identity of Evs Dropper is revealed | | | |
| 102 | "Into the Wild, Part 2" (PDF). (24.7 MB) | 2008-09-08 | Timm Keppler | Jason Badower | Behind the scenes photo of Sendhil Ramamurthy (Mohinder Suresh). |
| 102 | "Into the Wild, Part 2" (PDF). (24.7 MB) | More of Evs Dropper's past is revealed, and a surprising double-cross occurs | | | |
| 103 | "Into the Wild, Part 3" (PDF). (27.4 MB) | 2008-09-15 | Jim Martin | Jason Badower | Cast photo. |
| 103 | "Into the Wild, Part 3" (PDF). (27.4 MB) | The Evs Dropper storyline concludes. | | | |

== Season 3 ==
The comics listed here were published during Season Three of the show.

=== Volume 3: Villains ===
The comics listed here were published during the show's "Volume 3: Villains" arc.

| Issue | Title | Release date | Story | Art | Easter egg |
|---|---|---|---|---|---|
| 104 | "Dreams Until Death" (PDF). (18.8 MB) | 2008-09-22 | Christopher Zatta | Alitha Martinez | Behind the scenes photo of Zachary Quinto (Sylar). |
| 104 | "Dreams Until Death" (PDF). (18.8 MB) | Company agents Gael Cruz and Bianca confront Sylar outside the Bennets' home. | | | |
| 105 | "The Sting of Injustice" (PDF). (20.3 MB) | 2008-09-29 | Christopher Zatta | Alitha Martinez | Behind the scenes photo of Zachary Quinto (Sylar) examining Hayden Panetteire (Claire Bennet)'s brain. |
| 105 | "The Sting of Injustice" (PDF). (20.3 MB) | How escaped Level 5 inmates Knox and Jesse first aroused The Company's attention. | | | |
| 106 | "Resistance" (PDF). (14.5 MB) | 2008-10-07 | Bill Hooper | Micah Gunnell | Behind the scenes photo of Brea Grant. |
| 106 | "Resistance" (PDF). (14.5 MB) | The events that lead up to Claire's decision to kill Peter Petrelli. | | | |
| 107 | "Doyle" (PDF). (14.7 MB) | 2008-10-13 | Chuck Kim | Marcus To | Behind the scenes photo of Sendhil Ramamurthy. |
| 107 | "Doyle" (PDF). (14.7 MB) | Doyle's incarceration in, and subsequent escape from, Level 5. | | | |
| 108 | "Sum Quod Sum, Part 1" (PDF). (15.1 MB) | 2008-10-20 | Oliver Grisby | Jason Badower | Behind the scenes photo of Robert Forster (Arthur Petrelli). |
| 108 | "Sum Quod Sum, Part 1" (PDF). (15.1 MB) | Elle gets by with a little help from a friend. | | | |
| 109 | "Sum Quod Sum, Part 2" (PDF). (15.9 MB) | 2008-10-27 | Oliver Grisby | Jason Badower | Behind the scenes photo of Sendhil Ramamurthy, Robert Forster, and Zachary Quinto. |
| 109 | "Sum Quod Sum, Part 2" (PDF). (15.9 MB) | Elle gets some assistance. | | | |
| 110 | "Viewpoints" (PDF). (18.7 MB) | 2008-11-04 | Chuck Kim | Alitha Martinez | Behind the scenes photo of Zachary Quinto, Hayden Panettiere, and Allan Arkush. |
| 110 | "Viewpoints" (PDF). (18.7 MB) | Sylar's first and only solo mission. | | | |
| 111 | "Playing With Fire" (PDF). (18.3 MB) | 2008-11-11 | Zach Craley | Michael Gaydos | Behind the scenes photo of Zachary Quinto. |
| 111 | "Playing With Fire" (PDF). (18.3 MB) | The childhood of Meredith and Flint is explored. | | | |
| 112 | "Partners" (PDF). (17.26 MB) | 2008-11-18 | Bill Hooper | Dan Panosian | Behind the scenes photo of Milo Ventimiglia and Robert Forster. |
| 112 | "Partners" (PDF). (17.26 MB) | Noah Bennet and Meredith Gordon track down an escaped prisoner from Level 5. | | | |
| 113 | "The Caged Bird, Part 1" (PDF). (20.7 MB) | 2008-11-25 | Timm Keppler | Alitha Martinez | Behind the scenes photo of Sendhil Ramamurthy. |
| 113 | "The Caged Bird, Part 1" (PDF). (20.7 MB) | Daphne Millbrook's back-story is revealed, from her childhood until the manifestation of her ability. | | | |
| 114 | "The Caged Bird, Part 2" (PDF). (21.7 MB) | 2008-12-02 | Timm Keppler | Alitha Martinez | Photo of Claire from the episode "The Eclipse, Part 2" |
| 114 | "The Caged Bird, Part 2" (PDF). (21.7 MB) | Daphne's back-story continued, fleeing and eventually coming back home to Kansas and her father. | | | |
| 115 | "Truths" (PDF). (17.57 MB) | 2008-12-09 | Zach Craley | Peter Steigerwald | Behind the scenes photo of Masi Oka and Robert Forster. |
| 115 | "Truths" (PDF). (17.57 MB) | Arthur Petrelli reflects on his life in the moments before he is killed. | | | |
| 116 | "Stuck In The Middle" (PDF). (12.58 MB) | 2008-12-16 | Jim Martin | Jason Badower | Photo of Masi Oka and Garrett Masuda. |
| 116 | "Stuck In The Middle" (PDF). (12.58 MB) | Ryan learns the truth about the program at Pinehearst. | | | |
| 117 | "Red Eye, Part 1" (PDF). (17.1 MB) | 2008-12-23 | J.T. Krul | Marcus To | Behind the scenes photo of Greg Grunberg. |
| 117 | "Red Eye, Part 1" (PDF). (17.1 MB) | Revenge on the Kill Squad. | | | |
| 118 | "Red Eye, Part 2" (PDF). (16.5 MB) | 2008-12-30 | David Wohl | Marcus To | Behind the scenes photo of Kristen Bell. |
| 118 | "Red Eye, Part 2" (PDF). (16.5 MB) | Running away from the past rarely leads to the future. | | | |
| 119 | "Under The Bridge, Part 1" (PDF). (14.5 MB) | 2009-01-06 | Harrison Wilcox | Dennis Calero | Behind the scenes photo of Masi Oka and Robert Forster. |
| 119 | "Under The Bridge, Part 1" (PDF). (14.5 MB) | Surviving a bus crash. | | | |
| 120 | "Under The Bridge, Part 2" (PDF). (14.1 MB) | 2009-01-13 | Harrison Wilcox | Dennis Calero | Behind the scenes photo of Jimmy Jean-Louis, Jamie Hector and Hayden Panettiere. |
| 120 | "Under The Bridge, Part 2" (PDF). (14.1 MB) | Attempting to run. | | | |
| 121 | "What We Have Wrought" (PDF). (12.1 MB) | 2009-01-20 | Joseph Robert Donnelly | Alitha Martinez | Behind the scenes photo of Hayden Panettiere and Milo Ventimiglia. |
| 121 | "What We Have Wrought" (PDF). (12.1 MB) | Mohinder is asked to reproduce the formula. | | | |
| 122 | "Almost Famous" (PDF). (16.1 MB) | 2009-01-27 | R.D. Hall | Chris Cross | Behind the scenes photo of Greg Grunberg and Ntare Guma Mbaho Mwine. |
| 122 | "Almost Famous" (PDF). (16.1 MB) | Parkman tries to stay out of the limelight. | | | |

=== Volume 4: Fugitives ===
The comics listed here were published during the show's "Volume 4: Fugitives" arc.

| Issue | Title | Release date | Story | Art | Easter egg |
|---|---|---|---|---|---|
| 123 | "Out of Town...On Business" (PDF). (13.45 MB) | 2009-02-03 | Jim Martin | Jason Badower | Behind the scenes photo of Greg Grunberg, Brea Grant, and Ntare Guma Mbaho Mwine. |
| 123 | "Out of Town...On Business" (PDF). (13.45 MB) | Noah Bennet goes out on "business". | | | |
| 124 | "Libertad" (PDF). (16.86 MB) | 2009-02-10 | D.J. Doyle | Marcus To | Behind the scenes photo from the episode Trust and Blood. |
| 124 | "Libertad" (PDF). (16.86 MB) | Claire receives a call to arms from a mysterious "friend". | | | |
| 125 | "The Swimmer" (PDF). (15 MB) | 2009-02-17 | D.J. Doyle | Micah Gunnell | Behind the scenes photo from the episode Building 26 of Moira Kelly (Abby Collins). |
| 125 | "The Swimmer" (PDF). (15 MB) | Some of Alex Woolsley's back-story is revealed. | | | |
| 126 | "Comrades, Part 1" (PDF). (14.4 MB) | 2009-02-24 | Christopher Zatta | Michael Gaydos | Behind the scenes photo from the episode Cold Wars |
| 126 | "Comrades, Part 1" (PDF). (14.4 MB) | Noah & Claude meet a retired Ivan whilst hunting "The Russian". | | | |
| 127 | "Comrades, Part 2" (PDF). (15.2 MB) | 2009-03-03 | Christopher Zatta | Michael Gaydos | Behind the scenes photo from the episode Exposed (Heroes) |
| 127 | "Comrades, Part 2" (PDF). (15.2 MB) | Ivan causes problems for Noah & Claude whilst after "The Russian". | | | |
| 128 | "Puppet With No Strings" (PDF). (24.2 MB) | 2009-03-10 | Greg Beeman | Edgar Delgado | Behind the scenes photo Sylar (Zachary Quinto) and his father (John Glover) |
| 128 | "Puppet With No Strings" (PDF). (24.2 MB) | There is no happy ending to Doyle's tale of woe. | | | |
| 129 | "Hanging By a Thread" (PDF). (13.7 MB) | 2009-03-17 | Jim Martin | Micah Gunnell | Behind the scenes photo of Ando on a motorcycle. |
| 129 | "Hanging By a Thread" (PDF). (13.7 MB) | On the trail of a slippery special, Rachel's truth slips out. | | | |
| 130 | "Baby Power" (PDF). (17.6 MB) | 2009-03-24 | Yule Caise | Michael Gaydos | Behind the scenes photo of Noah pointing a gun at Peter. |
| 130 | "Baby Power" (PDF). (17.6 MB) | Hiro and Ando get their first parenting experience. | | | |
| 131 | "Cog" (PDF). (13.1 MB) | 2009-03-31 | Foz McDermott | Jason Badower | Behind the scenes photo of Angela Petrelli on a bench in the cathedral. |
| 131 | "Cog" (PDF). (13.1 MB) | In his final hours on the job, Agent Jenkins meets his match. | | | |
| 132 | "Scenic Route" (PDF). (15.29 MB) | 2009-04-07 | Zach Craley | Marcus To | Behind the scenes photo of Samson Gray (John Glover). |
| 132 | "Scenic Route" (PDF). (15.29 MB) | West and Alex need Mr Bennet's help. | | | |
| 133 | "Exodus" (PDF). (11.5 MB) | 2009-04-14 | Bill Hooper | Siya Oum | Behind the scenes photo of Alice Shaw (Diana Scarwid) and Angela Petrelli (Cristine Rose). |
| 133 | "Exodus" (PDF). (11.5 MB) | Rachel's coming out party. | | | |
| 134 | "One Good Hero" (PDF). (17.3 MB) | 2009-04-21 | Oliver Grigsby | Michael Gaydos | Behind the scenes photo of Sylar (Zachary Quinto). |
| 134 | "One Good Hero" (PDF). (17.3 MB) | Rescuing Nathan. | | | |
| 135 | "The Natural Order of Things" (PDF). (20.2 MB) | 2009-04-28 | Harrison Wilcox | Phil Jimenez | Behind the scenes photo of Sylar (Zachary Quinto). |
| 135 | "The Natural Order of Things" (PDF). (20.2 MB) | A moment of reflection. | | | |
| 136 | "Rebellion, Part 1: Rebel Yell" (PDF). (14.0 MB) | 2009-05-05 | Zach Craley | Dennis Calero | Behind the scenes photo of Claire Bennet (Hayden Panettiere) and Emile Danko (Željko Ivanek). |
| 136 | "Rebellion, Part 1: Rebel Yell" (PDF). (14.0 MB) | In the midnight hour, Micah's rebel yell. | | | |
| 137 | "Rebellion, Part 2: Providence in the Fall of a Sparrow" (PDF). (15.78 MB) | 2009-05-12 | Zach Craley | Dennis Calero | Behind the scenes photo of Matt Parkman (Greg Grunberg) and Daphne Millbrook (Brea Grant) . |
| 137 | "Rebellion, Part 2: Providence in the Fall of a Sparrow" (PDF). (15.78 MB) | Micah meets Sparrow. | | | |
| 138 | "Rebellion, Part 3: Family" (PDF). (17.7 MB) | 2009-05-19 | Oliver Grigsby | Jason Badower | Behind the scenes photo of West Rosen (Nicholas D'Agosto) and Claire Bennet (Hayden Panettiere). |
| 138 | "Rebellion, Part 3: Family" (PDF). (17.7 MB) | While families were being torn apart, another was formed. | | | |
| 139 | "Rebellion, Part 4: Left Behind" (PDF). (13.5 MB) | 2009-06-01 | Oliver Grigsby | Jason Badower | Behind the scenes photo of Micah Sanders (Noah Gray-Cabey) and Monica Dawson (Dana Davis). |
| 139 | "Rebellion, Part 4: Left Behind" (PDF). (13.5 MB) | The sights have been set on Micah. | | | |
| 140 | "Rebellion, Part 5: Wanted" (PDF). (17.6 MB) | 2009-06-16 | Harrison Wilcox | Jason Badower | Behind the scenes photo of Nathan Petrelli (Adrian Pasdar). |
| 140 | "Rebellion, Part 5: Wanted" (PDF). (17.6 MB) | Micah turns the tables on Thompson. | | | |
| 141 | "Rebellion, Part 6: Lost and Found" (PDF). (21.0 MB) | 2009-07-14 | Timm Keppler | Dennis Calero | Behind the scenes photo of Peter Petrelli (Milo Ventimiglia) and Angela Petrelli (Cristine Rose). |
| 141 | "Rebellion, Part 6: Lost and Found" (PDF). (21.0 MB) | Micah's plan to find Monica comes off the rails. | | | |
| 142 | "Rebellion, Part 7: The Liberation of Saint Joan" (PDF). (18.6 MB) | 2009-08-18 | Jim Martin | Jason Badower | Behind the scenes photo of Sylar (Zachary Quinto). |
| 142 | "Rebellion, Part 7: The Liberation of Saint Joan" (PDF). (18.6 MB) | Micah's efforts to find Monica take a new twist. | | | |
| 143 | "Ice Queen, Part 1" (PDF). (17.9 MB) | 2009-09-08 | Harrison Wilcox | Robert Atkins | Behind the scenes photo of Tracy Strauss (Ali Larter) and Dr. Zimmerman (Ronald Guttman). |
| 143 | "Ice Queen, Part 1" (PDF). (17.9 MB) | Is Tracy on the cold path of revenge? | | | |
| 144 | "Ice Queen, Part 2" (PDF). (15.1 MB) | 2009-09-15 | Harrison Wilcox | Robert Atkins | Behind the scenes photo of Tracy Strauss (Ali Larter). |
| 144 | "Ice Queen, Part 2" (PDF). (15.1 MB) | Tracy's killing ways begin to weigh on her soul. | | | |

== Season 4 ==
The comics listed here were published during and after Season Four (Volume Five: Redemption) of the show.

| Issue | Title | Release date | Story | Art | Easter egg |
|---|---|---|---|---|---|
| 145 | "Stolen Fate" (PDF). (20.55 MB) | 2009-09-22 | Zach Craley | Luis Puig | Behind the scenes photo of Robert Knepper, Dawn Olivieri, and Ray Park. |
| 145 | "Stolen Fate" (PDF). (20.55 MB) | Lydia and Hiro have a common carnival past. | | | |
| 146 | "Running in Circles" (PDF). (13.75 MB) | 2009-09-29 | Zach Craley | Michael Gaydos | Behind the scenes photo of Ali Larter and Ray Park. |
| 146 | "Running in Circles" (PDF). (13.75 MB) | Edgar and Lydia share a secret bond. | | | |
| 147 | "Boom" (PDF). (17.67 MB) | 2009-10-06 | Foz McDermott | Ryan Odagawa | Behind the scenes photo of Hayden Panettiere. |
| 147 | "Boom" (PDF). (17.67 MB) | H.R.G. tries to save a young fire-starter. | | | |
| 148 | "Amanda's Journey, Part 1" (PDF). (13.72 MB) | 2009-10-13 | Christopher Zatta | Siya Oum | Behind the scenes photo of Sasha Pieterse. |
| 148 | "Amanda's Journey, Part 1" (PDF). (13.72 MB) | Amanda's fire-starting ability leads her to Peter. | | | |
| 149 | "Amanda's Journey, Part 2" (PDF). (11.15 MB) | 2009-10-20 | Christopher Zatta | Siya Oum | Behind the scenes photo of Ali Larter. |
| 149 | "Amanda's Journey, Part 2" (PDF). (11.15 MB) | Tracy steps up to save Amanda from herself. | | | |
| 150 | "Yang & Yang" (PDF). (11.56 MB) | 2009-10-27 | Foz McDermott | Ryan Odagawa | Behind the scenes photo of Jordon Dang, Mikey Kawata, and Satomi Okuno. |
| 150 | "Yang & Yang" (PDF). (11.56 MB) | At the carnival, Amanda encounters Sylar. | | | |
| 151 | "Smoke & Mirrors" (PDF). (11.47 MB) | 2009-11-03 | Erin Fitzgerald | Michael Gaydos | Behind the scenes photo of Robert Knepper. |
| 151 | "Smoke & Mirrors" (PDF). (11.47 MB) | Amanda's carnival odyssey opens some eyes. | | | |
| 152 | "The Painted Lady" (PDF). (11.93 MB) | 2009-11-10 | Oliver Grigsby | Dennis Calero | Behind the scenes photo of Dawn Olivieri. |
| 152 | "The Painted Lady" (PDF). (11.93 MB) | Lydia reaches out to bring Amanda back into the family fold. | | | |
| 153 | "Prodigals, Part 1" (PDF). (12.90 MB) | 2009-11-17 | Foz McDermott | Dennis Calero | Behind the scenes photo of Adrian Pasdar, Milo Ventimiglia, and Greg Grunberg. |
| 153 | "Prodigals, Part 1" (PDF). (12.90 MB) | Tracy embarks on a secret mission for Samuel. | | | |
| 154 | "Prodigals, Part 2" (PDF). (11.48 MB) | 2009-11-24 | Foz McDermott | Dennis Calero | Behind the scenes photo of Zachary Quinto. |
| 154 | "Prodigals, Part 2" (PDF). (11.48 MB) | Eli sends Tracy away from the Carnival — to an uncertain fate. | | | |
| 155 | "Prodigals, Part 3" (PDF). (14.24 MB) | 2009-12-01 | Howie Kaplan | Dennis Calero | Behind the scenes photo of Milo Ventimiglia and Adrian Pasdar. |
| 155 | "Prodigals, Part 3" (PDF). (14.24 MB) | Tracy's mysterious mission for Samuel takes an unexpected twist. | | | |
| 156 | "Requiem for My Brother" (PDF). (11.48 MB) | 2009-12-08 | Bill Hooper | Ryan Odagawa | Behind the scenes photo of Danica Stewart. |
| 156 | "Requiem for My Brother" (PDF). (11.48 MB) | A look at the man, the Senator, and the brother. | | | |
| 157 | "Bloodlines, Part 1" (PDF). Archived from the original (PDF) on 2010-10-18. (12.34 MB) | 2009-12-15 | Zach Craley | Siya Oum | Behind the scenes image of Dawn Olivieri's tattoos being applied. |
| 157 | "Bloodlines, Part 1" (PDF). Archived from the original (PDF) on 2010-10-18. (12.34 MB) | Joseph's quest to find the root of Samuel's power goes terribly awry. | | | |
| 158 | "Bloodlines, Part 2" (PDF). Archived from the original (PDF) on 2010-10-18. (11.63 MB) | 2009-12-22 | Zach Craley | Siya Oum | Behind the scenes image of Željko Ivanek and Ray Park. |
| 158 | "Bloodlines, Part 2" (PDF). Archived from the original (PDF) on 2010-10-18. (11.63 MB) | Joseph meets up with Danko — and pays Arnold a fateful visit. | | | |
| 159 | "Starting Over" (PDF). (13.79 MB) | 2009-12-28 | Erin Fitzgerald | Ryan Odagawa | Behind the scenes image of David H. Lawrence XVII. |
| 159 | "Starting Over" (PDF). (13.79 MB) | Doyle's fate is in the hands of Samuel and Joseph. | | | |
| 160 | "The Trip, Part 1" (PDF). (14.6 MB) | 2010-01-04 | Foz McDermott | Jason Badower | Behind the scenes image of Doug Haley and Julian De La Celle. |
| 160 | "The Trip, Part 1" (PDF). (14.6 MB) | Hiro's scrambled brain leads him on a weird, wonderful trip to Florida. | | | |
| 161 | "The Trip, Part 2" (PDF). (14.69 MB) | 2010-01-12 | Jim Martin | Jason Badower | Behind the scenes image of Jack Coleman, Hayden Panettiere, and Milo Ventimiglia. |
| 161 | "The Trip, Part 2" (PDF). (14.69 MB) | Hiro's addled odyssey continues. | | | |
| 162 | "Second Chances" (PDF). (12.08 MB) | 2010-01-19 | Oliver Grigsby | Luis Puig | Behind the scenes image of Sendhil Ramamurthy. |
| 162 | "Second Chances" (PDF). (12.08 MB) | Can Suresh really withdraw and start a new life with Mira? | | | |
| 163 | "Reaching Out, Part 1" (PDF). (12.89 MB) | 2010-01-26 | Oliver Grigsby | Siya Oum | Behind the scenes image of Robert Knepper. |
| 163 | "Reaching Out, Part 1" (PDF). (12.89 MB) | Lauren knows Tracy's the only hope for thwarting Samuel. | | | |
| 164 | "Reaching Out, Part 2" (PDF). (11.21 MB) | 2010-02-02 | Oliver Grigsby | Siya Oum | Behind the scenes image of Sendhil Ramamurthy, James Kyson Lee, and Masi Oka. |
| 164 | "Reaching Out, Part 2" (PDF). (11.21 MB) | Despite attacks from Eli and Becky, Tracy finds her way to the Carnival. | | | |
| 165 | "Consequences" (PDF). (14.21 MB) | 2010-02-09 | Zach Craley | Ryan Odagawa | Behind the scenes image of Hayden Panettiere, Milo Ventimiglia, Greg Grunberg, Leonard Roberts, Sendhil Ramamurthy, James Kyson Lee and Masi Oka. |
| 165 | "Consequences" (PDF). (14.21 MB) | Angela tries to make sense of what Samuel has wrought on her family. | | | |
| 166 | "From the Files of Primatech, Part 1" (PDF). (20.01 MB) | 2010-02-16 | Howie Kaplan | Jason Badower | None. |
| 166 | "From the Files of Primatech, Part 1" (PDF). (20.01 MB) | The original founders of The Company have come together in Greenwich Village for a folk concert—but they're not there for the music. | | | |
| 167 | "From the Files of Primatech, Part 2" (PDF). (20.95 MB) | 2010-03-01 | Howie Kaplan | Jason Badower | None. |
| 167 | "From the Files of Primatech, Part 2" (PDF). (20.95 MB) | The Company's co-founders find trouble at a coffeehouse concert. | | | |
| 168 | "From the Files of Primatech, Part 3" (PDF). (25.4 MB) | 2010-03-15 | Foz McDermott | Ryan Odagawa | None. |
| 168 | "From the Files of Primatech, Part 3" (PDF). (25.4 MB) | What has summoned Hiro to the Three Mile Island nuclear power plant? | | | |
| 169 | "From the Files of Primatech, Part 4" (PDF). (24.03 MB) | 2010-03-29 | Foz McDermott | Ryan Odagawa | None. |
| 169 | "From the Files of Primatech, Part 4" (PDF). (24.03 MB) | What's happened at Three Mile Island—and why are The Company's founders freaking out? | | | |
| 170 | "From the Files of Primatech, Part 5" (PDF). (11.23 MB) | 2010-04-12 | Erin Fitzgerald | Jason Badower | None. |
| 170 | "From the Files of Primatech, Part 5" (PDF). (11.23 MB) | Hiro time travels to Berlin circa 1988 as Claude and Thompson make a shocking discovery. | | | |
| 171 | "From the Files of Primatech, Part 6" (PDF). (11.73 MB) | 2010-04-26 | Erin Fitzgerald | Jason Badower | None. |
| 171 | "From the Files of Primatech, Part 6" (PDF). (11.73 MB) | When a KGB agent goes big, Claude's clearly overmatched. | | | |
| 172 | "From the Files of Primatech, Part 7" (PDF). (14.43 MB) | 2010-05-10 | Zach Craley | Ryan Odagawa | None. |
| 172 | "From the Files of Primatech, Part 7" (PDF). (14.43 MB) | In 1991, Bob Bishop began a sick series of experiments on his daughter Elle. | | | |
| 173 | "From the Files of Primatech, Part 8" (PDF). (13.12 MB) | 2010-06-09 | Zach Craley | Ryan Odagawa | None. |
| 173 | "From the Files of Primatech, Part 8" (PDF). (13.12 MB) | In 1991, Bob Bishop began a sick series of experiments on his daughter Elle. | | | |
