= Clear and present danger (disambiguation) =

Clear and present danger was a doctrine adopted by the US Supreme Court to determine when limits can be placed on freedoms defined by the First Amendment to the Constitution of the United States.

Clear and present danger may also refer to:

- Clear and Present Danger, a 1989 novel by Tom Clancy
  - Clear and Present Danger (film), a 1994 film adaptation
- "Clear and Present Danger", a 2014 episode of the ABC TV series Castle
- "A Clear and Present Danger", a 2009 episode of the NBC TV series Heroes
