= Exposed (Heroes) =

- Heroes episode
- REBEL tells Peter Petrelli (Milo Ventimiglia) and Matt Parkman (Greg Grunberg) where Daphne Millbrook (Brea Grant) is.
- Episode no.: Season 3 Episode 18
- Directed by: Eric Laneuville
- Written by: Adam Armus and Kay Foster
- Production code: 318
- Original air date: March 2, 2009

Guest appearances
- Ashley Crow as Sandra Bennet; Dan Byrd as Luke Campbell; David H. Lawrence XVII as Eric Doyle; Justin Baldoni as Alex Woolsley; Taylor Cole as Rachel Mills; Željko Ivanek as Emile Danko; Randall Bentley as Lyle Bennet; Joshua Rush as Young Sylar; Natalie Salins as Sylar's mother; Angela Martinez as Andrea Charles

Episode chronology
← Previous "Cold Wars"	Next → "Shades of Gray"
- Heroes season 3

"Exposed" is the eighteenth episode of the third season of the NBC superhero drama series Heroes and fifty-second episode overall. The episode aired on March 2, 2009.

== Plot ==
In Isaac Mendez's old loft, Matt Parkman continues to paint pictures of the future in an effort to find Daphne Millbrook, but repeatedly only paints himself strapped to bombs. He and Peter Petrelli are then surprised to see a computer nearby activate with a message from the mysterious "Rebel," telling them where Daphne is and to leave immediately. Matt and Peter escape just before Danko's men storm the loft. He and Peter head to Building 26 in Washington D.C., where their plan is for Matt to use his telepathy to control enough people to allow them into the building and rescue Daphne. Matt isn't sure that he can control all of the people they will encounter, so Peter replicates his power to make this easier. Using their abilities, Matt and Peter reach a control room where Peter starts to use the computer to try to find Daphne as they don't know exactly where she's being held. Danko finds out they're there, but Matt telepathically controls two guards to hold Danko where he is. Peter finds out Daphne's not in the building, but has been moved to a medical facility. At this point, the "Rebel" opens a video file on the computer, showing the abducted heroes being loaded onto the plane from "A Clear and Present Danger," a video which would surely ruin the organization if exposed to the public. Peter copies the file to a flash drive, explaining they can use it as leverage to get Daphne back.

Matt's control over the two men is broken when Noah Bennet activates the fire alarm, which causes Matt to lose focus on using his telepathy. Peter takes the flash drive and the two start to escape, while the building's power is cut (presumably by "Rebel"). Matt and Peter encounter Danko, Nathan Petrelli, Noah and some of their men and Matt telepathically holds them in place and tells Peter to escape while he holds them there. Peter does but the power comes back on along with the fire alarm, disrupting Matt's telepathy again and causing him to be caught. Later, Peter tries to trade the video for Matt and Daphne, but Noah and Danko set up a trap. Unexpectedly, Noah telepathically warns Peter of the trap and thanks to his warning he moves and is only clipped in the shoulder by a bullet, but falls off the roof of the building they are on. However, he is caught and flown away by Nathan.

Afterwards, Nathan has a conversation with his mother, Angela Petrelli, and Peter. Nathan suspects Angela of being the "Rebel" but she dismisses it, claiming she would never betray Nathan and she is in full support of his agency. Nathan tries to convince Peter to come back with him so he can be safely arrested. Peter disagrees after Nathan won't say he does it because he loves Peter. Peter reabsorbs Nathan's ability and flies away to safety. Nathan wants to go after his brother but is stopped by Angela. She tells Nathan she's dreamed of the future again, telling him "the game has changed" and that he "needs to be ready." She then whispers something to Nathan, after which it shows Nathan looking off in apparent awe.

Peter goes ahead and sends the video to news stations. Seeing it on the news that night, Danko straps Matt to a vest of bombs (fulfilling one of his paintings), drugs him and dumps him in the middle of Washington D.C. in order to make people "understand" that people with abilities are terrorists by presumably detonating the bomb Matt's attached to.

Meanwhile, Sylar and Luke Campbell continue their drive as Sylar searches for his father. They stop at an abandoned, boarded up diner, where Sylar has several flashbacks pertaining to his childhood. He remembers spotting a man and his father exchanging money prior to his father's immediate departure. In his memory, young Sylar chases his father outside of the restaurant and witnesses his father murder his mother in their car using telekinesis to cut her forehead, much like Sylar's own weapon of choice. After his flashback ends, Sylar vows to gain revenge on his father and demands that Luke return home to his mother.

Claire Bennet has continued to hide Alex Woolsley from Danko's men and the operation. Claire keeps him in her closet at first but then when her mother Sandra finds him she concedes that she is protecting him. At first Sandra is angry and disappointed, but she then offers to help Alex escape. She says that there is a van outside watching the house and then makes a fake ID for Alex. Later, Claire talks with her mother. Claire apologizes for dragging her mother into this, and asks her whether she and Noah are going to get a divorce. Sandra assures her she is not the reason they are having issues, and says she doesn't know yet. Claire and Alex also share a brief moment, wondering if things were different they might go out. Sandra then distracts the people watching the house, allowing Claire and Alex to escape out the back. After being chased, they hide in a pool to avoid being seen. While in the pool, Alex gives her mouth-to-mouth for oxygen, resulting in a kiss. At the end of the episode, Eric Doyle comes to Claire saying that Rebel has told him that Claire will help him.

=== Rebellion, Part 4: Left Behind ===
In graphic novels, it is explained that at the same time Peter and Matt enter Building 26 to find Daphne, the 'Rebel' team is looking for Micah's family there too. In his way out, Peter even meets West Rosen, but they ignore each other and continue their respective missions.

== Music ==
- Fleetwood Mac — "The Chain"

== Critical reception ==
Steve Heisler of The A.V. Club rated this episode a C−.

Robert Canning of IGN gave the episode 5.8 out of 10.
