= Taylor Cole =

American actress and model (born 1984)

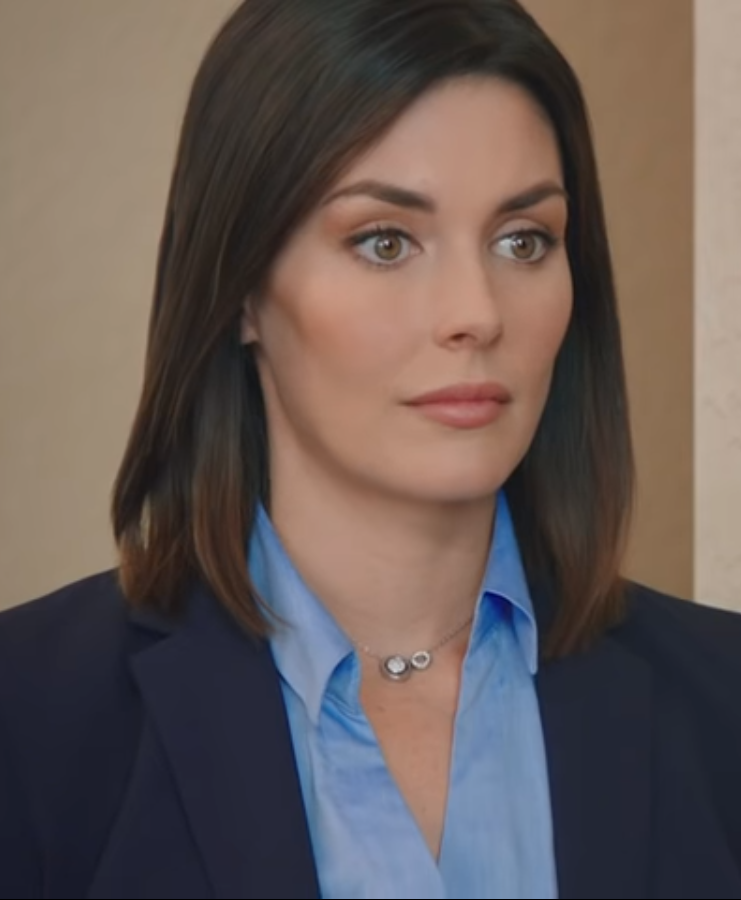
- Cole in 2016
- Born: Taylor Quinn Cole; April 29, 1984 (age 42); Arlington, Texas, U.S.
- Occupations: Actress; model
- Years active: 2002–present
- Height: 171.5 cm (5 ft 8 in)
- Spouse: Cameron Larson (m. 2020)

Taylor Quinn Cole (born April 29, 1984) is an American actress and former fashion model.

== Early life and modeling ==
Cole was born in Arlington, Texas. She attended Mirabeau B. Lamar High School, where she traveled with the Junior Olympics volleyball squad and also got her start as a model. She later moved to New York to further her modeling career. She has appeared in commercials and advertisements for Crest toothpaste, Old Spice, and Dooney & Bourke handbags.

== Career ==
After visiting her mother, Deborah Quinn, and stepfather, actor Shawn Christian (parents of her half-brother Kameron Christian), Cole landed an audition for the WB series Summerland. She won the role of Erika Spalding in 2004, relocating to Los Angeles to film the series.

Cole appeared in Ryan Cabrera's "True" music video, Bullet for My Valentine's video for "Tears Don't Fall" and Papa Roach's video for "Scars".

She guest-starred in The WB show Supernatural episode titled "Provenance", where she played Sarah Blake, an art dealer and later reprised the role in Season 8's "Clip Show" episode. She had a guest role in an episode of the CBS show NUMB3RS and appeared in an episode of CSI: Crime Scene Investigation as Bianca. She starred as Desiree in the horror remake, April Fool's Day. Cole had a part in the film 12 Rounds, produced by WWE Films and starring John Cena.

In December 2008, Cole appeared as Private Rachel Mills in the Heroes webisode series, The Recruit, and subsequently joined the main series in a recurring capacity playing the same character as at the start of 2009. She starred alongside Tiffany Shepis in The Violent Kind. She played the role of "Hot Neighbor" in the short-lived TV show Secret Girlfriend in 2009.

In April 2010, she guest-starred in the NCIS episode "Guilty Pleasure" as DC escort Charlotte Cook. From September 2010 to May 2011, she starred in The Event as Vicky Roberts, an assassin for a covert group.

In October 2011, she starred in the music video for The Walk by Mayer Hawthorne. In November 2011, she was cast in CSI: Miami in the recurring role of Samantha Owens, a lab technician. In 2012, she had a recurring role in the A&E series The Glades as Jennifer Starke.

Since 2016, Cole has starred in several Hallmark Channel made-for-TV movies including Appetite for Love, My Summer Prince, Christmas In Homestead, The Art of Us, Christmas Festival of Ice, One Winter Weekend, Falling For You, One Winter Proposal, Matching Hearts, Aloha Heart, and a recurring role as Ruby Herring in the Ruby Herring Mysteries.

== Personal life ==
On June 20, 2020, Cole and producer Cameron Larson were married in a livestream ceremony from Lake Tahoe.

== Filmography ==
=== Film ===
Year	Title	Role	Notes
2006	All You've Got	Kaitlan	
2008	Loaded	Alex	
2008	April Fool's Day	Desiree Cartier	Direct-to-video film
2008	An American in China	Jennifer	
2009	12 Rounds	Erica Kessen	
2009	Surrogates	female lawyer	
2010	The Violent Kind	Shade	
2012	Melvin Smarty	June	
2013	Sins of the Preacher	Brianna Daniels	
2014	Dumbbells	Rachel Corelli	
2014	The Ganzfield Haunting	Becket	
2014	Bad Blood	Lauren Malone	
2015	Impastor	Yvette	
2016	Weaponized	Angela Walker	
2019	1st Born	Kate	

=== Television ===
Year	Title	Role	Notes
2004–2005	Summerland	Erika Spalding	Main role
2006, 2013	Supernatural	Sarah Blake	Episodes: "Provenance", "Clip Show"
2006	Numb3rs	Brandi	Episode: "Double Down"
2006	CSI: Miami	Taylor	Episode: "Dead Air"
2006	CSI: Crime Scene Investigation	Bianca Desmond	Episode: "Daddy's Little Girl"
2008	Finish Line	Jessie Chase	Television film
2008	Do Not Disturb	Tasha	Episode: "Work Sex"
2008	Heroes: The Recruit	Rachel Mills	Episodes: "It Was Nothing", "Do What We Have to Do"
2008–2009	Heroes	Rachel Mills	Episodes: "Our Father", "Trust and Blood", "Exposed", "Shades of Gray"
2009	Cold Case	Nikki Atkins	Episode: "Lotto Fever"
2009	Melrose Place	Trudy Chandler	Episode: "Nightingale"
2009	Secret Girlfriend	Martina	Recurring role, 6 episodes
2010	NCIS	Charlotte Cook	Episode: "Guilty Pleasure"
2010–2011	The Event	Vicky Roberts	Main role
2011	Two and a Half Men	Melanie Laughlin	Episode: "Thank You for the Intercourse"
2011–2012	CSI: Miami	Samantha Owens	Recurring role (season 10), 10 episodes
2012	Hawaii Five-0	Hillary Chaver	Episode: "Ua Hala"
2012	The Glades	Jennifer Starke	Recurring role (season 3), 8 episodes
2013	Castle	Regina Cane	Episode: "Under the Influence"
2013	Addicts Anonymous	Julie	Episode: "Mistakes"
2015	Ballers	Stephanie Michaels	Episode: Pilot
2016	Second Chance	Jilly	Episode: "Palimpsest"
2016	Appetite for Love	Mina Jones	Television film (Hallmark)
2016	Below the Surface	Monica	Television film (Lifetime)
2016	My Summer Prince	Mandy Cooper	Television film (Hallmark)
2016	Christmas In Homestead	Jessica McEllis	Television film (Hallmark)
2016–2017	The Originals	Sofya Voronova	Recurring role (seasons 3–4)
2017	The Art of Us	Dr. Harper Higgins	Television film (Hallmark)
2017–2018	Salvation	Fiona Lane	Recurring role
2017	Christmas Festival of Ice	Emma	Television film (Hallmark)
2018	One Winter Weekend	Cara	Television film (Hallmark)
2018	Falling For You	Lacey Hathaway	Television film (Hallmark)
2019	One Winter Proposal	Cara	Television film (Hallmark)
2019	Ruby Herring Mysteries: Silent Witness	Ruby Herring	Television film (Hallmark Movies & Mysteries)
2019	Ruby Herring Mysteries: Her Last Breath	Ruby Herring	Television film (Hallmark Movies & Mysteries)
2020	Matching Hearts	Julia Palmer	Television film (Hallmark)
2020	Ruby Herring Mysteries: Prediction Murder	Ruby Herring	Television film (Hallmark Movies & Mysteries)
2020	Unlocking Christmas	Dr. Kate Stafford	Television film (Hallmark Movies & Mysteries)
2021	One Perfect Wedding AKA One Winter Wedding	Cara	Television Film (Hallmark)
2021	South Beach Love	Sara Kelly	Television Film (Hallmark)
2021	Making Spirits Bright	Grace Ryan	Television Film (Hallmark)
2022	Pumpkin Everything	Amy	Television film (Hallmark)
2022	Long Lost Christmas	Hayley	Television film (Hallmark Movies & Mysteries)
2023	Aloha Heart	Sara	Television film (Hallmark)
2024	A Reason for the Season	Evie Lane	Television film (Hallmark)
2025	Double Scoop	Nora	Television film (Hallmark)

=== Music Videos ===
Year	Artist	Song	Role	Notes
2005	Papa Roach	Scars	Girlfriend	
