= Shades of Gray (Heroes) =

- Heroes episode
- Sylar meets his father portrayed by John Glover.
- Episode no.: Season 3 Episode 19
- Directed by: Greg Beeman
- Written by: Oliver Grigsby
- Production code: 319
- Original air date: March 9, 2009

Guest appearances
- Ashley Crow as Sandra Bennet; David H. Lawrence XVII as Eric Doyle; Taylor Cole as Rachel Mills; Kevin Christy as Vic; Nigel Gibbs as Police lieutenant; Randall Bentley as Lyle Bennet; Mara LaFontaine as Beth; Željko Ivanek as Emile Danko; John Glover as Samson Gray

Episode chronology
← Previous "Exposed"	Next → "Cold Snap"
- Heroes season 3

"Shades of Gray" is the nineteenth episode of the third season of the NBC superhero drama series Heroes and fifty-third episode overall. The episode aired on March 9, 2009.

== Plot ==
Nathan Petrelli discovers Danko's plan to set up Matt Parkman as a terrorist to blow up in Washington D.C. While Matt is surrounded by police forces, Nathan flies over to talk to him. Danko sees Nathan with Matt on news channels, but decides to detonate the bomb anyway. However, "Rebel" intervenes by hacking into the network. Nathan urges Matt to use his powers to see if he can find out how to disarm the bomb by reading the minds of the police around him. Danko gains control of the bomb again, but Matt manages to disarm it in time. Nathan then punches Matt, who is then taken into custody. Later, Nathan tells Danko he will attempt to have him removed from the agency, though Danko responds by saying he heard Tracy Strauss mention Nathan was "one of us." Nathan meets with Tracy, urging her not to divulge anything. When Danko enters her cell to ask her about Nathan possibly having powers, she replies she has no idea. Later, Danko talks with Noah Bennet about asking Angela Petrelli about Nathan. Noah warns Angela that Danko has set his sights on her, though she replies she'll be ready for him. Danko meets with Angela in New York, and attempts to discover if Nathan has an ability, pointing out that Nathan's brother, daughter and parents all had abilities. Angela denies it, and then brings up a certain incident in Danko's past that had involved the deaths of many people. At this, Danko is visibly stirred and leaves. Afterwards, Nathan notifies Danko that he's been fired after consulting with the President, and decides to appoint Noah in his place. Danko later confronts Nathan with a gun, but instead of killing him, he shoots at the window behind Nathan and pushes him through it. Nathan activates his ability to stop his fall, but in clear view of Danko; Nathan then flies away, leaving a bewildered Danko to ask Noah if he had any idea of it.

Sylar finally arrives at his father Samson's house, an old run-down place that is falling apart. Samson seems indifferent when he meets Sylar, and when Sylar announces his intentions to kill him, he reveals he is already dying from cancer. Samson also reveals he has a power similar to Sylar's, including an acquired ability that paralyzes a person as if they were drugged. He also shares knowledge of Sylar's methodology, picking easy, helpless targets rather than going after "big game." He also suggests Sylar take the fight to Nathan's agency rather than always running from their agents. When Samson witnesses Sylar heal instantly after accidentally cutting himself, he tries to take the ability from Sylar by paralyzing him. Sylar, however, manages to override it. Samson points out that taking his ability will not harm him as he can heal, but Sylar says he doesn't wish for his father to have such a power, and decides to leave. Samson begs Sylar to kill him, but Sylar says his cancer will eventually do so anyway, and leaves. Later, Danko returns to his apartment and discovers Samson's stuffed rabbit on his desk, and Sylar is shown ready to confront him.

Claire Bennet is shocked to find Eric Doyle at her house, who says "Rebel" had told him to ask her for help. Claire refuses to do so, after what Doyle had done to her and her mother. Doyle at first wonders why Claire hadn't been hunted after, and after Claire reveals she had been given a free pass, he accuses her of abandoning her kind for not helping. Doyle insists he's changed, and that she doesn't know what it's like to be hunted. Doyle then leaves after explaining he doesn't want to force her to help. Claire later gets a job at the comic book store, filling Alex Woolsley's position, and after being asked during the interview about what type of hero she would want to be, she wonders if she should have helped Doyle. She then gets a message from "Rebel" warning her that agents have found Doyle. Doyle manages to use his ability to subdue one of the agents, but Claire arrives and knocks out the other. Later, she hands him a folder containing everything he needs to start a life under a new identity. Doyle thanks her, and Claire mentions that she is doing so because it is "who [she] needs to be right now." When Claire asks Doyle if he really has changed, Doyle just smiles and walks away. Later, "Rebel" sends a message to Claire warning that her free pass has expired and that agents are coming to apprehend her. The agents find no trace of Claire in the bedroom; Claire is shown in Nathan's arms, floating outside her window as they look on.

Hiro Nakamura and Ando Masahashi arrive at an address in Los Angeles, under directions from "Rebel" to save Matt Parkman. However, they find out the message had possibly been referring to another person, as they find Matt Parkman to be a baby. The baby's annoyed teenage babysitter is eager to pawn the baby off to them, who believes Hiro and Ando to be her replacement, and then leaves. A confused Hiro is left holding the baby Matt Parkman.

== Critical reception ==
Josh Modell of The A.V. Club rated this episode a C.

Robert Canning of IGN gave the episode 6.4 out of 10.
