= Heroes Evolutions =

2007 American TV digital tie-in game

Heroes Evolutions is a digital extension of the NBC series Heroes that explores the Heroes universe. It was originally entitled Heroes 360 Experience but the name was changed for season 2.

Heroes Evolutions was activated on January 19, 2007, the day when episode 12, "Godsend," was first aired in the United States. Viewers can investigate clues from the show on this official website, which incorporates aspects of an alternate reality game. Heroes Evolutions also incorporates the show's weekly graphic novels, which began being published on the show's website each Tuesday on September 26, 2006.

In an interview at the 2007 Wizard World in Los Angeles, co-executive producer and writer Jesse Alexander said that all the stories in the experience "connect with the show" and provide participants with real spoilers. He went on to say that this current version is a dry run for an even bigger experience in the works for next year.

Heroes Evolutions has had 48 million page views as of March 22, 2007, plus over 27 million video downloads. On May 14, 2007, the program was renewed for the second season.

On September 13, 2008, Heroes Evolutions received a Creative Arts Emmy for Interactive Media Programming: Interactive Fiction.

As of November 8, 2008, during the show's third season, Heroes Evolutions began releasing iStory content: interactive stories that sometimes allow the reader to shape what happens in the story. The first iStory volume, "Friend or Foe", allowed readers to participate in two sides of the same story that parallel Volume Three of Heroes. Two chapters were released simultaneously each week, with each chapter allowing readers to play as a character hired by one side of the story, choosing some of that character's actions. Chapters of subsequent volumes, "The Private" and "The Agent", have only been released a single chapter at a time.

== Channels of participation ==
- Participants may call a special phone number for additional content, and also may use text messages to get updates, and clues to finding more content.
- Participants may register their email addresses for additional interactive experiences, including emails 'from the characters'.
- Additional information about the characters and storylines will be hidden on the website, and other websites have been established to expand the stories, including MySpace pages, and faked private sites.
- Commentary from the cast will be added to the webisodes.
- The phone number, 1-800-PRIMA-16, for the fictional company Primatech, where Mr. Bennet works in the show, was revealed in episode 12, "Godsend" when Bennet gives his business card to Mohinder Suresh, though Mr. Bennet's "access code" (written on the back of the card) was not. The real access code (as revealed in Hana's blog) is 42307#.
  - Trying this number will play a short advertisement for Nissan, then tell the caller that the extension is no longer active.
  - Trying this number and extension will now take you to the voicemail box of a Mr. Thompson.
- Participants can text message the word "APPLY" to cell number 46622 to receive text messages from Primatech.
  - This code was also revealed in episode 12, "Godsend", as a snipe on-screen.
  - Directions are given via text message to log onto the Primatech website and use the code "MT36" on the site (on the "Jobs" link). This leads the user to an application for employment at Primatech. At the bottom of the application are a series of questions that matched the questions asked for the original "Are you on the list?" test on the Heroes website.
  - The participant is also directed to reply to the text message with just the word "Y"; they then receive the message "You'll be hearing from me again soon. We have a lot to do together."

A wireless application protocol (WAP) website has been launched to access special Heroes-related content by mobile phone. In addition, a special "two screen" application will be provided to simulate a real-time event. The Heroes 360 Experience is sponsored by Nissan, who previously sponsored NBC's online-only reality talent competition Star Tomorrow and a free iTunes download of the pilot episode of Heroes.

- The Primatech Paper website instructs a participant to text the word "PAPER" to number 46622; the participant receives a link to the WAP site
  - The home WAP site is the cell phone equivalent of the main Primatech Paper website; however, the Careers section prompts a participant for their name and cell phone number, whereas the main website prompts for the code mentioned above. Prior to the episode on February 12, 2007 ("Run!") when a user submitted their information, they would be redirected to a new WAP page which read "Trying to crack into this thing. Give me about a week. I'll let you know what to do." After the 19th, the site reads: "Plan A has gone into effect. Let's get together to observe. Go to www.samantha48616e61.com at 9:00 PM on Monday, 2/26/07."
