= Cold Snap (Heroes) =

- Heroes episode
- Tracy Strauss executing her "cold snap".
- Episode no.: Season 3 Episode 20
- Directed by: Greg Yaitanes
- Written by: Bryan Fuller
- Production code: 320
- Original air date: March 23, 2009

Guest appearances
- Noah Gray-Cabey as Micah Sanders; Brea Grant as Daphne Millbrook; David H. Lawrence XVII as Eric Doyle; Lisa Lackey as Janice Parkman; William Duffy as Doctor; Željko Ivanek as Emile Danko; Swoosie Kurtz as Millie Houston

Episode chronology
← Previous "Shades of Gray"	Next → "Into Asylum"
- Heroes season 3

"Cold Snap" is the twentieth episode of the third season of the NBC superhero drama series Heroes and fifty-fourth episode overall. The episode aired on March 23, 2009, and marks the return of writer Bryan Fuller.

== Plot ==
The episode opens on Emile Danko shaving in his bathroom, when he is interrupted by his house alarm indicating the front door is open. Danko carefully investigates, noticing the open door, but also finds Eric Doyle, drugged and wrapped as a present with a gift note to Danko. Noah Bennet meets with Angela Petrelli in New York, who tells Noah to keep Danko from setting his sights on capturing her son Nathan Petrelli. Angela suggests he give Danko "Rebel" to distract him; though Noah points out that he may be of use to them, Angela remarks she is prepared to continue on without the aid of "Rebel." Before leaving, Noah implies that Angela has now been targeted, though Angela replies she was planning on leaving the city.

Later, Noah tells Danko that he can get Rebel for him. Having reviewed what he knows of Rebel's communications to Tracy Strauss, Noah believes that Rebel has a plan for her. He persuades Danko that they allow Rebel to break Tracy out so they can follow her to Rebel; a plan which Noah hopes will earn him Danko's trust and respect now that Nathan is no longer able to exert a moderating influence on the operation. Rebel does indeed break Tracy out by cutting the power to the heat lamps and unlocking doors for her. As she is escaping, she also frees Matt Parkman and Mohinder Suresh, who had also been pacified and hooked up to drugs. As they leave, Matt carries the wounded Daphne Millbrook with them. Afterwards, Matt and Mohinder take Daphne to a hospital. Daphne recovers from her wound and leaves, telling Matt that she cannot start a relationship based on a dream. Matt finds Daphne in Paris and reveals to her he can now fly. They fly together over Paris, admitting their feelings for each other. However, Daphne realises it is only fantasy, and that she is really still in the hospital. Daphne succumbs to her wounds and dies, with Matt in her head giving her a final, happy goodbye.

Noah catches Tracy in a clothing store, revealing his plan of using her as bait to catch Rebel. However, he offers to let her go if she can lead his men to Rebel; Danko had wanted to kill both Tracy and Rebel once they were caught. Tracy eventually meets Rebel, who is revealed to be Micah Sanders. Tracy apologizes for what she has done, and Micah chastises her for it, though they are able to escape to a parking garage. Seeing agents closing in, Tracy tells Micah to use his ability to activate the fire-sprinkler system. Telling Micah to go on without her, Tracy uses her freezing ability to kill the agents and, in the process, sacrifice herself for Micah like Niki Sanders did at the end of Volume 2. Danko arrives and shoots the frozen Tracy, causing her to shatter into many pieces, while Noah laments over his failed plan to catch Rebel and Tracy's apparent death (although a piece of Tracy's face is shown, where her right eye is seen blinking away a tear).

Hiro Nakamura and Ando Masahashi continue with the mission that Rebel entrusted to them, to keep the new hero safe. "Baby Matt Parkman" is discovered to be the child Matt had with his ex-wife, and to have the ability to deliver power with his touch (turning on a TV, activating electronic toys, etc.). Matt's ex-wife arrives, and they explain the situation. Before they can leave, Danko's men storm the house, and Hiro, Ando, and the baby seem trapped. However, the baby inadvertently helps Hiro regain his powers of time manipulation, and he is able to stop time. However, he finds he is still unable to teleport, and he takes the baby and the frozen-in-time Ando away from the house in a wheelbarrow. Far from the house, Hiro reverts time to normal, where he and Ando decide that with the baby, they will now be able to save the real Matt Parkman.

Danko's men do come for Angela, though she is able to evade them having foreseen the event via her precognitive dreams. She then visits a friend of hers for cash to disappear. Finally, Danko's men seem to corner her in an elevator, as she had been trying to travel up the building, though the agents had changed the wiring to call the elevator down. However, Peter Petrelli arrives through the elevator shaft, and flies her to safety. The episode closes on a shot of Peter and Angela regrouping within the fitting irony of the Statue of Liberty, contemplating what to do next.

== Critical reception ==
"Cold Snap" was met with overwhelmingly positive reviews with many considering it the best episode of the series' later run.

Steve Heisler of The A.V. Club rated this episode a B.

Robert Canning of IGN gave the episode 8.6 out of 10.
