= Trust and Blood =

- Heroes episode
- Claire Bennet (Hayden Panettiere) and Noah Bennet (Jack Coleman) talk at the crash scene, while Nathan Petrelli (Adrian Pasdar) looks on.
- Episode no.: Season 3 Episode 15
- Directed by: Allan Arkush
- Written by: Mark Verheiden
- Production code: 315
- Original air date: February 9, 2009

Guest appearances
- Ashley Crow as Sandra Bennet; Brea Grant as Daphne Millbrook; Dan Byrd as Luke Campbell; Ntare Mwine as Usutu; Julia Campbell as Mary Campbell; Joel West as Agent Daniel Simmons; Taylor Cole as Rachel Mills; Željko Ivanek as Danko; Jonny Siew as Analyst

Episode chronology
← Previous "A Clear and Present Danger"	Next → "Building 26"
- Heroes season 3

"Trust and Blood" is the fifteenth episode of the third season of the NBC superhero drama series Heroes and forty-ninth episode overall. The episode, also classed as episode 2 of Volume 4, aired on February 9, 2009.

== Plot ==
After the plane crash, the heroes scatter and are chased by government agents. Matt, Suresh, and Hiro all end up hiding in the same ditch and work together to avoid capture. Matt and Suresh are hopeful that Hiro can just teleport them away, but Hiro tells them that his powers are gone. Matt enters a precognitive state and leads the other two to a trailer where he finds crayons.

He draws many pictures, but the most attention is paid to a drawing of Daphne being shot with the plane wreckage in the background. Matt rushes back to the crash site, and Hiro and Mohinder follow.

Ando tries to book a flight to Russellville, Arkansas after tracking Hiro's GPS signal, but the person on the other end of the phone seems to have never heard of Russellville. Daphne shows up as Ando hangs up the phone. She's trying to find Matt and figured Hiro and Ando may be able to help. When Ando hears Matt disappeared as well, he decides the people who kidnapped Hiro may have Matt too. Daphne grabs Ando and speeds off to Russellville.

Peter and Claire are escaping together when Noah appears and holds them at gunpoint. He initially tries to force them both to come back to the camp with him, but eventually agrees to let Peter escape when he realizes that he's not willing to shoot him.

Claire, though, is taken back to the military troops' camp where Nathan is waiting and makes plans to send her back home. Claire is unwilling to forsake her friends, though, and rages against both of her fathers and their betrayal of the other heroes.

Daphne and Ando arrive at the crash site and, while they don't see either Matt or Hiro, they see Claire in shackles. Daphne reassures Ando that Hiro can't be dead since Ando kills him in the future and speeds off to bust out Claire.

By the time Daphne and Claire return, Matt and the others have shown up. Everyone has a semi-joyous reunion before the government troops show up and start shooting. Daphne is the first to take a bullet, fulfilling the prophecy of Matt's drawing. Claire starts taking bullets to cover the others' escape, but Matt takes the opportunity to get revenge instead of running. He gets into one of the men's head and makes him start shooting his fellow soldiers. The Hunter shows up and kills the brainwashed man and Matt makes a run for it. Everyone except for Claire and Daphne escape.

The Hunter drags Claire back to the camp and threatens to shoot Claire in the back of her head, figuring that will be enough to kill her. Noah and Nathan both show up at an opportune time and tell The Hunter to stand down. Nathan and The Hunter have words that amount to the Hunter telling Nathan to watch his back because he won't always be in touch while Noah escorts Claire to a car and warns her that the Hunter will be watching her like a hawk now. Claire gets into the car and finally goes home.

On Peter's escape from Noah, he runs into Tracy. She initially wants to go back, figuring she can get her life back, but Peter convinces her to make a run for it. He hatches a plan to steal military uniforms and head back to the camp to stop Nathan, but Tracy figures out a way to trick Nathan, figuring they think the same and thus she can get into his head.

Tracy calls Nathan and tells him that she can give him Peter if he will give her life back. They set up a rendezvous at the historic site of the battle of Russellville, planning to trap him.

Naturally, Nathan saw the trap coming and brought some of "his team", including the Hunter and Noah, with him. A standoff ensues in which Noah repeatedly refuses to take a kill shot on Peter while he holds a gun to Nathan's head. In an earlier conversation with Tracy, Peter explained that he can only take one power by touch now. As soon as he picks up a new power, the last one is gone. He takes the opportunity of being in contact with Nathan to steal his power and fly away. Tracy tries to bargain, but is taken prisoner once again.

Peter, Matt, Suresh, Hiro, and Ando all regroup and plan to go underground to plan their revenge. They agree to ditch their cellphones, credit cards, and any attachment to their own lives in the realization that Nathan will be watching. Peter warns that they will have to do things that they never imagined and nobody seems fazed, least of all Matt who makes it clear that he is not interested in justice, only revenge, as it is still unknown (but presumed) whether Daphne is dead.

Forty-two hours later, Nathan is recounting all of this to someone over the phone. At the end of the conversation, Nathan tells her that they both know Peter and both know that he will eventually come to her. Nathan wants to know if she will do the right thing and call him when it happens.

Angela tells Nathan that she won't help now as he pushed her aside to work with the government. As she says this she looks over a file on Danko, it has a newspaper clipping and mentions a killing.

After Angela hangs up on Nathan, he heads to a trailer where a hooded figure is sitting, he removes the hood to reveal that the figure is Tracy. He makes a speech about how he is doing the right thing for everyone. Over Tracy's cries that Nathan is "One of us", Tracy is redrugged and rehooded and Nathan walks away in darkness.

In Newark, NJ, Sylar has kidnapped Agent Simmons in a house near his father's taxidermy shop. When the residents (a woman named Mary and her teenage son Luke) return to the house, Sylar develops a new plan. He has gotten nowhere by torturing Simmons, so he decides to torture Mary and Luke until the agent reveals information about Sylar's father and who he is working for. Sylar uses his silver-tongue to intimidate Mary and Luke. Eventually Luke struggles to get out of his grip and uses his power on Sylar's cup, causing it to explode. Impressed, Sylar pulls him aside and has him demonstrate it further. Whilst Sylar is mocking Mary about Luke, Agent Simmons frees himself and pulls a gun. Luke instinctively pushes Sylar aside and uses his ability on Simmons, whose blood starts to boil and leaks out like water. Now that the only source of information about his biological father gone, Sylar departs. Luke chases him and begs to come along. Sylar declines until Luke says he knows where his father is. Sylar can tell he isn't lying and agrees. They steal Mary's car and drive off.

Back in Costa Verde at the Bennet House, Sandra thinks Claire has been looking at college placements. Claire tells her about wanting to go to a school close to home, and Sandra is excited. After she leaves, Claire gets an anonymous text messages from a person calling themselves "Rebel", stating to keep fighting and not give up. The sender doesn't reveal any more except that he hates "them" as much as Claire does.

Private Rachel Mills (Taylor Cole), the lead character of the Heroes Webseries The Recruit, makes her first appearance in the main series with this episode.

== Critical reception ==
Josh Modell of The A.V. Club rated this episode a B.

Robert Canning of IGN gave the episode 7.5 out of 10.
