= Company Man (Heroes) =

- Heroes episode
- Episode no.: Season 1 Episode 17
- Directed by: Allan Arkush
- Written by: Bryan Fuller
- Production code: 117
- Original air date: February 25, 2007

Guest appearances
- Eric Roberts as Thompson; Ashley Crow as Sandra Bennet; Randall Bentley as Lyle Bennet; Matthew John Armstrong as Ted Sprague; Missy Peregrym as Candice Wilmer; Jimmy Jean-Louis as the Haitian; George Takei as Kaito Nakamura; Christopher Eccleston as Claude; Garrett Masuda as Young Hiro Nakamura; Sheku Fofana as Young Haitian

Episode chronology
← Previous "Unexpected"	Next → "Parasite"
- Heroes season 1

"Company Man" is the seventeenth episode of the first season of the American superhero drama series Heroes. Written by Bryan Fuller and directed by Allan Arkush, the episode aired on NBC in the United States on February 25, 2007.

== Plot ==
Matt Parkman and Ted Sprague break into the Bennet house and take the Bennets hostage. Matt and Ted want information about Primatech Paper Company and Noah Bennet's involvement in abductions of people with power.

Bennet learns that the Haitian did not wipe Claire's memory as instructed. Claire informs Matt and Ted that her father is not a paper salesman, and privately confesses to Matt that she, too, has a power.

Ted suggests that Matt take Bennet to Primatech for evidence while Ted stays behind with Sandra and her son Lyle as hostages.

At Primatech, Bennet confronts the Haitian about not erasing Claire's memory.

Matt and Bennet return with a binder of evidence. The Haitian releases Claire and Sandra.

Bennet's boss, Thompson, appears and shoots Ted in the shoulder, causing him to lose control of his power and begin emitting huge quantities of heat, setting the house on fire.

At Primatech, Bennet and Thompson discuss the Haitian, who has gone missing. Thompson implies that after they put Ted through tests, they will kill him. Bennet says that Matt was very helpful, and Thompson suggests Matt's power would make him a good partner for Bennet.

In the car, Claire asks her father where she is going and he replies that he does not know. Bennet stops at the same bridge where he shot Claude. The Haitian is waiting for them. Bennet instructs the Haitian to shoot him in the stomach to make it appear that Claire was taken by force, and also to erase from his memory anything that would lead his bosses to finding her.

In addition to the main storyline, the episode contains several flashbacks to Noah Bennet's time working for Primatech.

== Reception ==
The episode was met with critical acclaim.

Lynette Rice describes the episode as "an episode with a streamlined, single-character focus that is often cited as a model for the jam-packed ensemble show."

The episode was ranked #68 on TV Guide's list of "TV's Top 100 Episodes of All Time".

Fuller has later gone on and recently said "Out of all the scripts I've written, that [Company Man] is still the best thing I've wrote".

== Accolades ==
Jack Coleman and Greg Grunberg submitted this episode for consideration of their work in the category of "Outstanding Supporting Actor in a Drama Series" and for the 2007 Emmy Awards, respectively. Similarly, Hayden Panettiere also submitted this episode in the category of "Outstanding Supporting Actress in a Drama Series" on her behalf. Recurring guest stars, Ashley Crow and Matthew John Armstrong, also chose this episode for submission in the categories of "Outstanding Guest Actress in a Drama Series" and "Outstanding Guest Actor in a Drama Series" respectively.
