= Cold Wars =

- Heroes episode
- Matt uses his Telepathy to press Noah for information.
- Episode no.: Season 3 Episode 17
- Directed by: Seith Mann
- Written by: Christopher Zatta, Joe Pokaski and Aron Eli Coleite
- Production code: 317
- Original air date: February 23, 2009

Guest appearances
- Ashley Crow as Sandra Bennet; Brea Grant as Daphne Millbrook; Željko Ivanek as Emile Danko

Episode chronology
← Previous "Building 26"	Next → "Exposed"
- Heroes season 3

"Cold Wars" is the seventeenth episode of the third season of the NBC superhero drama series Heroes and fifty-first episode overall. The episode aired on February 23, 2009.

== Plot ==
The episode begins with Matt Parkman, Peter Petrelli, and Mohinder Suresh planning to drug Noah Bennet and interrogate him. The scene from the previous episode is repeated, showing Noah getting dragged out of the bar by the three. They then take him to a hotel, where Matt uses his telepathic powers to probe Noah's mind and discover the origins of Nathan Petrelli's agency.

In the first flashback, taking place five weeks earlier, Noah is shown meeting with Angela Petrelli. She confirms that Primatech has been dismantled and gives him a watch for all the hard work that he had done over the years. Matt confirms that the drugs are working and he will be able to discover the truth of the agency soon, while Suresh becomes concerned for Noah's health and argues that Matt is intentionally hurting him in revenge for what happened to Daphne Millbrook. Peter resolves the issue by pointing out that Noah has all the answers, while they have nothing, and they must continue. In another flashback taking place a week after the first, Matt discovers Nathan had planned the whole thing. Nathan wanted Noah's help in rounding up the heroes because of his past experience in doing so. In the flashback, Noah is also seen showing Nathan all the equipment he's used over the years, hidden away in a locked room. Peter flies off to grab the weapons and gear.

Meanwhile, Danko becomes concerned that Noah hasn't checked in, and orders his team to find him. Nathan is surprised they are having Noah under surveillance, but Danko also reveals they are doing the same to him. Danko says Noah and Nathan's connections to Claire Bennet and Peter, who they have been somewhat partial to, compromises their decision making. At the storage unit, Peter begins procuring weapons and gear, all the while being watched by Nathan's agency due to a security camera. Danko has his men move in, but Peter manages to distract them with a flash grenade and flies off with the weapons.

Back in the hotel, Noah warns the two to leave while they can as the agency will be surely looking for him. Suresh agrees, but Matt decides to continue the interrogation. In the next flashback, taking place three weeks prior, Noah is introduced to Danko and Building 26. Noah is disappointed when Nathan reveals Danko will be running the operation, instead of him as he had originally thought. Later, Noah is shown asking Suresh for his help on the job. Matt is furious that Suresh had known about the agency's plan without telling them, while Suresh claims he didn't believe Noah at the time. The two have a brief struggle, which distracts them enough to allow Noah to escape. However, Peter arrives just in time to stop him.

Matt decides to discover more about Danko, and delves into Noah's mind once more. In a flashback one week prior, Noah is seen paying a visit to Danko's house. The two seem to be at odds, but Noah assures him he'll obey his orders. Peter flies off to confront Danko, while it is also shown Danko's men are mobilizing outside the hotel. Before Danko can give the order to move in, he is stopped by Peter. Danko tries to get Peter to shoot him to prove his point that people like him are dangerous, but Nathan arrives at the scene (Danko is surprised how he got there so quickly). Peter shoots Danko in the arm, but Nathan warns Peter that by killing Danko he will effectively be writing a kill order on all people with abilities. Nathan also informs Peter of the imminent raid on Matt and Suresh, causing Peter to fly off. Danko then orders his men to move in.

Seeing that Danko's men have arrived, Matt intends to kill Noah, but Noah claims Daphne is still alive. Suresh offers to hold off the commandos while Matt can read Noah's mind once more for confirmation. In the final memory taking place two days ago, Noah is seen visiting a recently captured Daphne, who while wounded is still very much alive. Mohinder manages to distract several of the guards, but is eventually captured. Matt decides to not kill Noah and is captured as well. However, as the guards are leading him back to the van, Peter swoops in, grabs Matt, and flies off. Nathan visits Suresh in a holding cell, and informs him he must help him find a solution to people's abilities, lest the government decide that they should all be killed. Later, Danko decides that Nathan's personal interests are clouding his judgment, and asks Noah to help him take over the agency. Noah agrees, but is later shown meeting with Angela Petrelli, telling her he's successfully gained Danko's trust for an unknown purpose. Matt and Peter fly to Isaac Mendez's old loft in New York and Matt draws the future in an attempt to find Daphne. Instead he draws pictures of pipe bombs and one of himself wearing a vest strapped with them. Peter tries to convince Matt that he isn't a murderer, but Matt demands an explanation for his most terrifying painting: a mural on the floor of Washington D.C. being destroyed in a nuclear explosion.

== Critical reception ==
Josh Modell of The A.V. Club rated this episode a C.

Robert Canning of IGN gave the episode 6.5 out of 10.
