= Building 26 =

- Heroes episode
- Hiro Nakamura (Masi Oka) protects the Indian bride Annapurna from being forced into marriage.
- Episode no.: Season 3 Episode 16
- Directed by: Sergio Mimica-Gezzan
- Written by: Rob Fresco
- Production code: 316
- Original air date: February 16, 2009

Guest appearances
- Ashley Crow as Sandra Bennet; Moira Kelly as Abby Collins; Dan Byrd as Luke Campbell; Justin Baldoni as Alex Woolsley; Amrapali Ambegaokar as Annapurna; Randall Bentley as Lyle Bennet; Željko Ivanek as Danko

Episode chronology
← Previous "Trust and Blood"	Next → "Cold Wars"
- Heroes season 3

"Building 26" is the sixteenth episode of the third season of the superhero drama series Heroes and fiftieth episode overall. The episode aired on February 16, 2009 on the NBC network in the United States, its country of origin. The episode was written by Rob Fresco and was directed by Sergio Mimica-Gezzan.

The episode rotates among four parallel stories:

- Hiro Nakamura (Masi Oka) and Ando Masahashi (James Kyson Lee) in India trying to stop a wedding depicted in Matt Parkman's precognitive drawings from the previous episode;
- Nathan Petrelli (Adrian Pasdar) at his campaign office trying to stop a new character, his new boss Abby (Moira Kelly), from shutting down his entire operation of rounding up all the humans with special abilities;
- Sylar (Zachary Quinto) and Luke Campbell (Dan Byrd) travelling on the road to find Sylar's birth father;
- tension in the Bennet family as Claire Bennet (Hayden Panettiere) reads text messages from a mysterious character known only as "Rebel".

== Plot ==
Matt Parkman's prophetic images from the previous episode leads Hiro Nakamura and Ando Masahashi to India to stop a wedding from taking place. The bride, Annapurna, is upset as she truly does not love the groom, Deepak, and is being forced into the wedding. Hiro becomes jealous of Ando, who talks to Annapurna and becomes the hero by making her call off the wedding. Afterwards, a furious Deepak kidnaps Ando and makes the wedding go ahead as planned. By the end of the episode, the wedding is in full swing when Hiro manages to stop the wedding, and get Ando back. Hiro discerns that the trip to India was destined so that he realizes that he can be the Hero without having special abilities. Near the end of the episode, the two receive a fax from the mysterious "Rebel", the same name that has been contacting Claire Bennet. The fax tells Hiro and Ando that they need to save Matt Parkman.

Meanwhile, Nathan Petrelli seeks more funding but finds trouble when his new boss, Abby (Moira Kelly), gets sent to investigate what he has been doing. She finds Tracy Strauss in captivity and orders Nathan to shut down the entire operation. Abby's mind drastically changes however when she sees Tracy escape and freeze a man to death, before being put back in her cell. Abby states that he can have all the funding he needs. Tracy believes that Nathan left the door unlocked and weakened the chains so she could escape for Abby to see the truth about the whole operation, and further warns Nathan she will inevitably escape. Nathan and Danko both know however that Danko had schemed the whole thing behind Nathan's back.

Sylar and Luke Campbell are heading west to find Sylar's birth parents. Tension increases between them as Luke tries to befriend Sylar, but they soon stop at a diner to refuel and get something to eat. Sylar states that recently his only desire is to find his birth father. Luke gives Sylar the address of his birth father out of sympathy, but Nathan's men charge in and ruin the moment. They capture Luke while Sylar escapes after betraying Luke by telling him he doesn't need him any more. Inevitably Sylar comes back, kills Nathan's men, rescues Luke and steals a laptop computer. Although Sylar states that he only came back for the laptop to learn how they have been tracking him, it is shown by Luke's probing that he may have a softer side.

Tension finds the Bennet family back at their house, with Claire Bennet telling her father, Noah Bennet that she "can't lie to (Sandra) any more." Noah, however, believes that Sandra, as well as Claire's brother, are safer not knowing about Nathan's plan. Noah then ends the conversation by saying he has enrolled her in college, which he is going to force her to attend.

Later on in the episode, Claire gets another anonymous text message from "Rebel" asking her to warn Alex Woolsley at Sam's Comics in Buford. She goes to rescue Alex, only to find Noah also there for the same reason. Staying hidden, she manages to get Alex to escape, and the two eventually run off. During this Alex reveals his ability is being able to breathe underwater. Claire advises Alex to stay hidden, then tries to return home to avoid suspicion. Noah catches her and determines what she's been doing. Noah warns her that if his agency discovers he can't control her anymore, she would be on the list of people to catch. Claire smiles and simply acknowledges that he can't. Claire finally gives in to her guilt from the start of the episode and tells Sandra about all the lies that Noah has been telling her, which leads to Noah getting kicked out of the house. It also shows Alex is staying hidden with Claire in her room. Later, at a hotel bar, Noah drinks as he examines his wedding ring before passing out. He is then picked up and walked away by Matt Parkman, Peter Petrelli, and Mohinder Suresh.

== Production ==
"Building 26" was the second episode directed by Sergio Mimica-Gezzan. Both the episodes are in season 3 and are the third chapters of a volume; volume 3 and 4 respectively. With "One of Us, One of Them" being the other episode. This episode was also the second written by Rob Fresco, the first of which was eight episodes previous in Villains. Fresco has however been a consulting producer for five episodes, all of which are in season 3, volume 3.

== Critical reception ==
The episode was viewed by 7.898 million people and was NBC's fourth most-watched program that week, only losing to The Office, The Biggest Loser, and a special Dateline NBC.

Steve Heisler of The A.V. Club rated this episode a C−.

Robert Canning of IGN gave the episode 7.2 out of 10.
