= David H. Lawrence XVII =

American actor

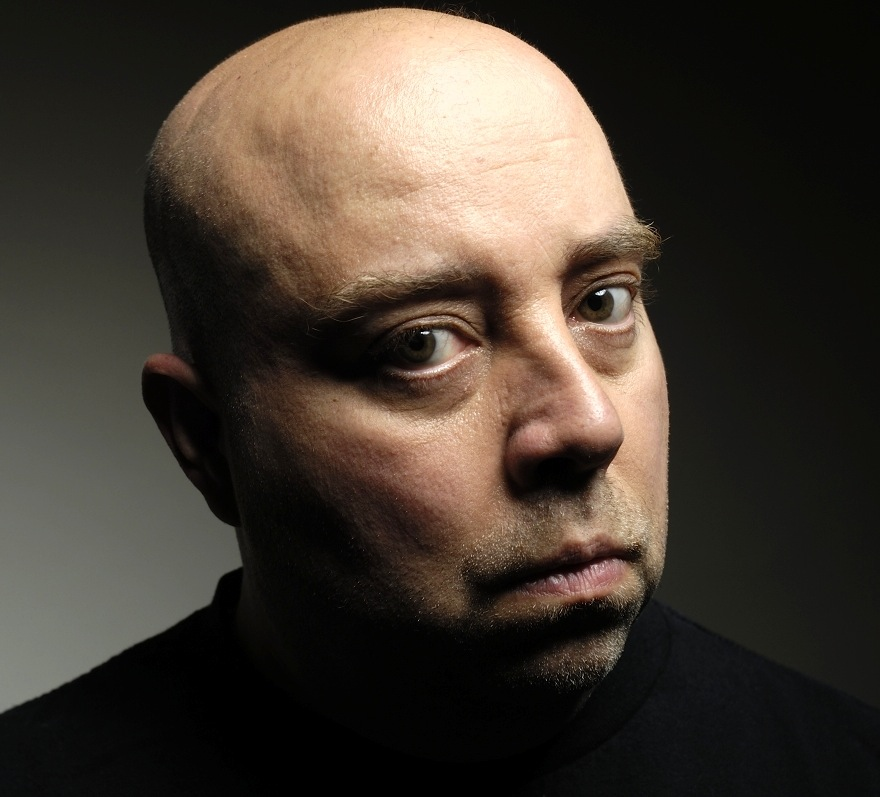
- Born: David Harvard Lawrence
- Occupations: Actor; broadcaster; author; new media consultant; podcaster; demo producer; teacher; author
- Website: https://www.davidhlawrencexvii.com/

David Harvard Lawrence, commonly known as David H. Lawrence XVII is an American actor, best known for his role as Eric Doyle on NBC's sci-fi series Heroes. He was also the host of the daily The David Lawrence Show and weekend Online Tonight, both nationally syndicated radio talk shows that revolved around pop culture and the high-tech lifestyle.

The "XVII" in his name was a way for Lawrence to distinguish himself from previous David Lawrences already registered with SAG. At the time, Lawrence was the 17th David Lawrence listed on IMDb and appended the number to his name upon his own registry.

== Acting ==
Lawrence's appearances on network television include playing a Serbian doctor opposite Dennis Haysbert in the CBS series The Unit, created by David Mamet; a car wash manager on another CBS series, CSI; a rock and roll wannabe on TBS's Frank TV with Frank Caliendo; and as one of the "villains" on NBC's Heroes. The Heroes role, that of puppetmaster Eric Doyle (one of the 12 escaped villains), was introduced in Volume 3, "Heroes: Villains" in Episode 2, "The Butterfly Effect". The character began a multi episode arc in Episode 5, "Angels and Monsters". Lawrence has also played the role as the station manager in Goodnight Burbank, Charles Bukowski in the musical Bukowsical!, El Gallo in The Fantasticks, as well as parts in The Children's Hour, The Good Doctor, Born Yesterday, The Fall of the House of Usher and the role of Barry Champlain in Talk Radio. He has performed on stage at the Kennedy Center for the Performing Arts. With director Bob Pondillo PhD, Lawrence played Wallace in the short film My Name Is Wallace. Lawrence was also executive producer of My Name Is Wallace. In early 2009, he appeared in an episode of the BBC reality program Beat the Boss, in which his team designed a cheesecake. In 2010, Lawrence portrayed a taxi cab driver in the sixth season of Lost, and in 2011, he guest starred in the NBC comedy action series Chuck. He is also in the Fox series The Finder and TNT series Perception.

== Radio broadcast history ==
Lawrence was heard on the radio for nearly 35 years on stations: WMAL, WMZQ and WRQX/Washington DC, WGAR, WGCL, WDMT/Cleveland, KC101/New Haven, WTAE/Pittsburgh and WNCI and WLVQ/Columbus. He is a founding member and former executive producer of the radio comedy ensemble, The American Comedy Network. Lawrence wrote the best-selling Learn HTML on The Macintosh, the first web design book created exclusively for Macintosh users. He was the anchor and executive producer of the music show, The Net Music Countdown, where one of his net unknown artists was Megaphone.

== Podcasting ==
Lawrence has been involved in podcasting since the inception. He holds the title of 'first podcaster' since he has been sending audio to subscribers via the internet since 1994 when he started the 'Personal Netcast'. Lawrence does voiceover work and speaks at events, including the NAB and the Portable Media Expo. He developed ShowTaxi, a subscription management for premium podcasters. Lawrence is also the host of a premium podcast called "Patrick Tucker's Secrets of Screen Acting: The Podcast."

== Voice work ==
Lawrence is the voice of America Online's customer service lines, and the voice of more than 1,500 other interactive voice response telephone systems. He also wrote and produced the radio programs for the video game Saints Row. In 2007, Lawrence started his Demos2GoGo, his own voiceover demo reel business. Starting on November 18, 2010, Lawrence did guest announcing for The Price Is Right, as he is a personal friend of host Drew Carey.

== Commentator ==
Lawrence makes regular appearances as an industry commentator on TechTV, CNN, FOX, CBS, MSNBC and Tribune broadcasting outlets as well as the CBC and the BBC, where he is on BBC Radio 5 Live's Up All Night.

== Filmography ==
Television roles
Year	Title	Role	Notes
2008	The Unit	Doctor	Episode: "Sex Trade"
2008	Frank TV	Camp Rock Camper	Episode: "Frank of America"
2008	CSI: Crime Scene Investigation	Car Wash Manager	Episode: "19 Down"
2008-2010	Heroes	Eric Doyle	Recurring
2009	Leaving Bliss	Jerry Dell	2 episodes
2009	Heroes: Nowhere Man	Jason Tyminski / Eric Doyle	Main
2009	Raising the Bar	Kessler's Clerk	Episode: "I'll Be Down to Get You in a Taxi, Honey"
2010	Lost	Cab driver	3 episodes
2010	How I Met Your Mother	Newscast Announcer	Episode: "Unfinished" (uncredited)
2011	Chuck	Marvin	Episode: "Chuck Versus the Muuurder"
2011	Good Luck Charlie	Fred	Episode: "Bye Bye Video Diary"
2011	A Gifted Man	WCBS News Anchor (voice)	Episode: "Pilot" (uncredited)
2012	How I Met Your Mother	Sports Play-by-Play Announcer	Episode: "Tailgate" (uncredited)
2012	The Finder	Miss-terious	Episode: "The Last Meal"
2012	A.N.T. Farm	Leonard Battaro	Episode: "ConfinemANT"
2012	Perception	Stan Baumgartner	Episode: "Nemesis"
2013	Touch	Morgue Worker	Episode: "Two of a Kind"
2013	Henchmen	Hugo Valentino	Miniseries
2013	The Mentalist	Titus Stone	Episode: "Black-Winged Redbird"
2013	Hulk and the Agents of S.M.A.S.H.	Mole Man (voice)	Episode: "Of Moles and Men"
2014	The 4 to 9ers: The Day Crew	Sergeant Doyle	4 episodes
2015	Bella and the Bulldogs	Janitor	Episode: "Newbie QB, Part 1"
2016	American Crime Story	NY TV Director	Episode: "The Run of His Life"
2023	The Afterparty	Dr. Shulkind	Episode: "Isabel"

Film roles
Year	Title	Role	Notes
2004	The Sound of Football	Principal Thomas Reasin	Short
2004	Instinct vs. Reason	The Knife	Short
2004	Cheer Up, Sleepy Jean	Jeannie's Father	Short
2005	Gods of Los Angeles	Eric Benton	
2005	The French Double	Alain Bente	Short
2006	A Cut Above	Randy	Short
2006	Everything Looks Perfect	Auto Salesman	Short
2006	A Bullet Beyond Redemption	Candy Man	Short
2006	My Name Is Wallace	Wallace	Short
2006	Goodnight Burbank	Frank Warfield	Short
2007	A New Tomorrow	Fat Mover	
2007	Pool Party	Richard	
2008	The Isolationist	Randy	Short
2008	Wait...		Short
2009	Gemini Max & the Glowing Goddess	Gemini Max / Maximilian / The Goddess' Mom	Short
2009	The NoHo Show	Albert	Short
2009	Hole in One	Taylor Massive	
2009	The New, True, Charlie Wu	Mr. Nugatorius	Short
2009	Enlightened!	Eugene	Short
2009	Blood Money	Marv	Short
2010	Olga Kay's Circus	Ringmaster	Short
2010	Exquisite Corpse	Officer Kirwin	
2011	Pizza Man	Detective Moser	
2012	The Miracles on Honey Bee Hill	God	Short
2012	Guitar Face	Mikey	Short
2012	Alice and the Monster	Mike	
2013	Miss Dial	Mr. Koffsky	
2014	Turn Around Jake	Murray	

Video game roles
Year	Title	Role
2006	Saints Row	Jack Armstrong, Stefan, Grounds For Divorce Barista and Priest, Conservative Talk Host
2011	L.A. Noire	Ray the Bookmaker
