= A Clear and Present Danger =

- Heroes episode
- Episode no.: Season 3 Episode 14
- Directed by: Greg Yaitanes
- Written by: Tim Kring
- Production code: 314
- Original air date: February 2, 2009

Guest appearances
- Brea Grant as Daphne Millbrook; Ntare Mwine as Usutu; Ned Schmidtke as Martin Gray; Assaf Cohen as Hesam; Joel West as Agent Daniel Simmons; Steve Tom as Steve; Željko Ivanek as Danko; Darren Kendrick as Pilot

Episode chronology
← Previous "Dual"	Next → "Trust and Blood"
- Heroes season 3

"A Clear and Present Danger" is the 14th episode and mid-season premiere of the third season of the NBC superhero drama series Heroes and 48th episode overall. It aired on February 2, 2009. The episode is the beginning of Volume 4: "Fugitives". It marks the first time a season of Heroes has contained more than one volume. Originally, season two was planned to consist of three volumes, but was reduced to one volume due to the 2007–2008 Writers Guild of America strike.

== Plot ==
Tracy Strauss is captured by armed men, while a TV interview with the new chairman of Senate Homeland Security Committee, Nathan Petrelli, plays in the background. The leader of the group, known as the Hunter, calls to tell Nathan they have the first one.

Hiro tries to make Ando into a superhero. Ando is unimpressed as he feels his power is worthless, and leaves when Hiro injects him with a GPS implant. Later, when Hiro tracks Ando and calls him to apologize, Ando overhears Hiro being kidnapped.

Having earned her GED, Claire Bennet is looking into an elite college education with Angela Petrelli, but is more concerned with Sylar and the fact they never found his body. As Claire is leaving, she listens in on a phone call where Nathan tells Angela to keep Claire away from Matt Parkman and Peter. Angela spots Claire, who promptly leaves.

Peter is working as a paramedic and attending to a car accident victim. His partner Hesam has to pull Peter away from the casualty, with Peter insisting he could have saved him, had he been stronger. Hesam mentions that Peter's brother is in town for the day. Peter receives a call from Claire warning him about Nathan’s plans. Peter goes to talk to Angela, while Claire goes to warn Matt. Peter catches a yellow cab driven by Mohinder Suresh. He asks Mohinder if he ever felt like he was meant to do something extraordinary. Mohinder points out that everyone is keeping a low profile, except for Nathan.

Once Peter is gone, the Hunter gets in the cab behind him and forces Mohinder to drive to a parking garage. As Mohinder gets out of the cab, he rips off the car door, knocks out the Hunter, and uses the door as a shield. Mohinder runs away and is rescued by Noah in his SUV. As they escape, Noah asks him with whom has he been in contact. They get to the exit only to discover that the Hunter and his men have cut them off. Noah apologizes and tasers Mohinder.

Peter arrives at Angela’s home and encounters Nathan, who informs him that their mother is not there. Nathan explains that he has his own plan and asks Peter for input, but Peter shows no interest. Later, Peter arrives at his own apartment and finds Nathan waiting for him. Nathan apologizes for disowning him and emphasizes the importance of what he is doing, again asking Peter to join him. When Peter refuses, Noah tasers him from behind.

Sylar, alive and well, goes to see Martin Gray, the watchmaker he believed to be his father. He discovers that Martin purchased Sylar from his brother, who was in need of money. When Sylar arrives at Samson Gray's home, he finds the door is open. Inside the house, a group of armed men attempt to immobilize Sylar with tranquilizer darts. Sylar overpowers them and starts to torture one for information.

Daphne superspeeds back into her apartment where Matt is eating. They discuss using their powers to make life easier, and Matt persuades her to lead a normal life. Usutu, visible only to Matt, stands nearby. Later, Usutu appears to Matt with a message, explaining he is an illusion. Usutu says that Matt is on a journey to become a prophet and the world needs him to tell the future. Matt’s eyes turn white, and he sketches himself being shot in the neck. While Matt inspects his finished work, Claire arrives to warn him that people will be coming to get him. Matt is shot in the neck by a dart outside his window. The men in black arrive and capture Claire.

At an airplane hangar, Nathan reviews his prisoners, all hooded and confined to negate their powers. The Hunter arrives and reports that Sylar escaped. He also shows Nathan that one of the prisoners is Claire. Nathan takes her and puts her in a car to be driven home, telling her to forget what she has seen. While the rest of the prisoners are led onto a cargo plane, Claire escapes from the car and sneaks aboard. Once airborne, Claire finds that the prisoners include Hiro, Peter, and Mohinder, and she removes the drug feeds from the latter two. Peter manages to touch Mohinder and take his power, using it to break his shackles. As Peter attacks the guards, Claire grabs a taser and goes to the cockpit, stunning one guard and threatening the pilot. She discovers that Noah is in the copilot’s seat.

Peter tries to free Tracy as another guard attacks him. He gains Tracy’s power and inadvertently touches the side of the plane. It freezes and shatters, and the guards and at least one prisoner are swept out. As the plane starts to go down, the netting onto which Peter is holding becomes unfastened and he starts to get swept away before Mohinder grabs hold of him. In the cockpit, the pilot loses control and the plane plummets towards the ground. The final shot shows Mohinder losing his grip on Peter's hand, a direct reference to the cliffhanger of the pilot episode, "Genesis".

== Critical reception ==
Josh Modell of The A.V. Club rated this episode a B−.

Robert Canning of IGN gave the episode 7.8 out of 10.
