= World's Wildest Police Videos =

American reality television series (1998–2012)

- Also known as: Police Videos
- Genre: Reality television Clip show
- Created by: Paul Stojanovich
- Presented by: John Bunnell
- Theme music composer: Shawn K. Clement
- Country of origin: United States
- Original language: English
- No. of seasons: Original series: 4 Revival series: 1 Overall: 5
- No. of episodes: Original series: 56; Revival series: 13; Overall: 69

Production
- Running time: 42–45 minutes
- Production companies: Paul Stojanovich Productions; Pursuit Productions; Pilgrim Studios; Spike Original; 20th Century Fox Television

Original release
- Network: Fox
- Release: April 2, 1998 – July 27, 2001
- Network: Spike
- Release: May 7 – August 13, 2012

Related
- World's Scariest Police Chases (1997 pilot)

World's Wildest Police Videos (shortened to Police Videos during its fourth season) is an American reality television series that ran on Fox from 1998 to 2001. In 2012, Spike announced that it had commissioned 13 new episodes with the revival of the original name and John Bunnell returning as host, which premiered on May 7, 2012, and ended on August 13, 2012. The series deals with police videos from across the world. Video footage of car chases, subsequent arrests, robberies, riots and other crimes appear on the show.

== Production ==
World's Wildest Police Videos began in 1998 and ran for four seasons, comprising a total of 56 episodes, before being officially canceled in 2002. In Season 4, the name was shortened to Police Videos.

Most of the police videos featured on the show were from various U.S. police departments, but footage from other nations such as Argentina, South Korea, Brazil, Russia, Australia, New Zealand, and the United Kingdom also appeared. Video sources included police dashcams, cameras from police and news helicopters, store security systems, news reporters, and private citizens from around the world. Much of the aired footage had previously only been seen by law enforcement officials before it appeared on the show.

The show became popular with viewers. It had the highest ratings of any Fox network television special to that date. It was also featured on Entertainment Tonight and was re-aired later that month. It was the first sweeps-month special ever to run twice during a sweeps period by Fox.

== Format ==
The series began with a special entitled World's Scariest Police Chases, which was broadcast on February 2, 1997. It was narrated by actor Peter Coyote, and featured commentary by Captain C. W. Jensen of the Portland Police Bureau. Five more editions of World's Scariest Police Chases aired, with the second on April 27, 1997, third on November 4, 1997, fourth on February 17, 1998, fifth on April 28, 1998, and the sixth on April 29, 1999.

A further two specials called World's Scariest Police Shootouts aired around this time as well. It was hosted by John Bunnell, a retired police officer and former Sheriff of Multnomah County, Oregon; series creator Paul Stojanovich had known Jensen and Bunnell through his early reality series, 1991's American Detective, for ABC, with Bunnell hosting that series in the last season.

The two specials focused on police shootouts rather than chases themselves, although some of the clips featured a car chase along with a shootout. The first edition of World's Scariest Police Shootouts aired on May 15, 1997, and the second edition entitled World's Scariest Police Shootouts 2 aired on April 23, 1998. Both episodes were narrated and hosted by Bunnell. However, these specials were created by Nash Entertainment and they now occasionally air on the Reelz channel. The episodes featured more well-known content, such as the North Hollywood shootout, the murder of Darrell Lunsford, the 1991 Sacramento hostage crisis, White supremacist Chevie Kehoe and his shootout with police, and the 1996 Honolulu hostage crisis.

Eventually, the show was broadcast weekly. Bunnell's commentary was often characterized by puns, multiple clichés, and over-dramatic descriptions of the struggle between good and evil, the police and criminals, victims and abusers, etc. Although Bunnell hosted and commented on most of the show, most police video segments were dubbed with the actual law enforcement officials acting in the situation presented. Tire screeching noises, horn beeps, automobile collision sounds and sirens are often overdubbed in these segments; this is especially noticeable in footage where vehicles are driving over dry grass or sand.

It has been widely noticed that the same voice is used in almost every helicopter footage scene, regardless of the location the footage is from. This uncredited role is said to be that of Lawrence Welk III, who usually goes by "Larry Welk", and is a reporter and helicopter traffic pilot for KCAL-TV and KCBS-TV in Los Angeles. He is also the grandson of famed musician Lawrence Welk.

Originally, a typical episode included sections entitled: "PIT Maneuver", "Car Thieves", "Rainy Chase", "Big Rig Road Block", "Jumping Off Bridge", and "Drunk Drivers". This was dropped after the first season, and replaced with a string of clips, each commentated on by Bunnell. After a few videos, a small clip of Bunnell would be shown, often describing the police mentality behind the videos that were about to appear.

Occasionally, episodes were dedicated to police officers killed in the line of duty and an episode featured the footage of the crash of Ethiopian Airlines Flight 961 in 1996.

There were VHS releases of the first three World's Scariest Police Chases specials with additional footage in late 1997 and a video game was released near the tail end of the series' original run in June 2001.

== Series overview ==
Season	Episodes	Originally released			TV Season	Time	Rank
Season	Episodes	First released	Last released	Network	TV Season	Time	Rank
S	26	February 2, 1997	June 28, 2003	Fox	1997–2003	N/A	N/A
1	6	April 2, 1998	May 7, 1998	Fox	1997–98	Thursdays at 8:00 PM	87
2	20	September 10, 1998	July 15, 1999	Fox	1998–99	Thursdays at 8:00 PM	86
3	12	September 16, 1999	February 25, 2000	Fox	1999–00	Thursdays at 8:00 PM (1–4); Fridays at 8:00 PM (5–12)	89
4	18	October 6, 2000	July 27, 2001	Fox	2000–01	Fridays at 8:00 PM	97
5	13	May 7, 2012	August 13, 2012	Spike	2011–12	Mondays at 8:00 PM (1–2); Mondays at 10PM (10–13); Mondays at 11PM (3–9)	N/A

== Episodes ==
=== Specials (1997–2003) ===
No.	Title	Original release date	U.S. viewers (millions)
World's Scariest Police Chases
1	"World's Scariest Police Chases"	February 2, 1997	17.74
2	"World's Scariest Police Chases 2"	April 27, 1997	15.96
3	"World's Scariest Police Chases 3"	November 4, 1997	18.16
4	"World's Scariest Police Chases 4"	February 17, 1998	17.79
5	"World's Scariest Police Chases 5"	April 28, 1998	12.77
6	"World's Scariest Police Chases 6"	April 29, 1999	12.91
World's Scariest Police Shootouts
1	"World's Scariest Police Shootouts"	May 17, 1997	12.24
2	"World's Scariest Police Shootouts 2"	April 23, 1998	12.91
Surviving the Moment of Impact
1	"Surviving the Moment of Impact"	February 17, 1998	19.67
2	"Surviving the Moment of Impact 2"	April 28, 1998	13.71
3	"Surviving the Moment of Impact 3"	February 25, 1999	12.14
4	"Surviving the Moment of Impact 4"	April 26, 2001	6.69
World's Worst Drivers: Caught on Tape
1	"World's Worst Drivers: Caught on Tape"	May 12, 1998	12.41
2	"World's Worst Drivers: Caught on Tape 2"	November 20, 1998	13.35
3	"World's Worst Drivers: Caught on Tape 3"	April 26, 2001	6.67
World's Most Shocking Moments: Caught on Tape
1	"World's Most Shocking Moments: Caught on Tape"	November 5, 1998	17.47
This is also known as "World's Dumbest Drivers" in the United Kingdom.
2	"World's Most Shocking Moments: Caught on Tape 2"	February 4, 1999	16.55
3	"World's Most Shocking Moments: Caught on Tape 3"	May 25, 1999	10.75
Other miscellaneous specials
1	"World's Scariest Police Stings"	November 20, 1997	9.32
2	"Prisoners: Out Of Control"	February 24, 1998 (Sky One – UK); September 1, 2006 (Spike – USA)	N/A
The special was originally planned to air after the "World's Scariest Police Chases 3", and was to air again after the premiere of the "World's Scariest Police Stings", but was pulled a week before its intended premiere due to its controversial content, and replaced with "The World's Deadliest Swarms". It would air overseas in Europe, Canada, and Australia until making its debut in America on Spike in 2006.; Clips Shown: 1993 Cheshire Correctional Facility Riot; Franklin County Jail Incident: Female inmate attacks correctional officer.; 1997 East jersey State Prison Gang Fight; 1996 Pitchess Detention Center Riot; Strangeways Prison riot; 1990 HM Prison Ashfield Riots; Peterhead Prison Riot; 1987 Barlinnie Prison Riot; 1997 Socoraba Prison Riot; 1997 San Pedro Prison Riot; 1994 Sabaneta fire; 1993 Saint-Gillis Prison Riot and Escape; 1994 Hostage taking of Aloisio Lorschieder; 1995 Vridloeselille Prison break; Murder of Lonnie Blackmon; 1993 Central Utah Correctional Facility Riot
3	"Riots: Mobs Out Of Control"	October 13, 1998 (Sky One – UK); December 12, 2002 (FX – USA)	N/A
The special was originally planned to air in June 1997 but was pulled for unknown reasons. It might have been pulled under similar circumstances that "Prisoners: Out Of Control" was pulled. It would air overseas in Europe, Canada, and Australia until making its debut in America on FX in 2002.; Clips Shown: Minneapolis, MN - 1992 Minneapolis Riots; Westwood Village, CA - 1995 Westwood Village Riots; Moscow, Russia - 1993 Moscow Riots; Dallas, TX - 1993 Dallas Riot; Huntington Beach, CA - 1986 Huntington Beach Riots; San Francisco - AB101 Veto Riot; Brussels, Belgium - Heysel Stadium disaster; Rio De Janeiro, Brazil - 1992 Maracana Stadium Collapse; São Paulo, Brazil - 1995 Pacaembu Stadium Riot; Montreal, Canada - 1993 Montreal Stanley Cup riot; Denver, CO - 1996 Denver Riots; Vancouver, British Columbia - 1994 Vancouver Stanley Cup riot; Madison, WI - 1993 Camp Randall Crush; Papeete, Tahiti - 1995 Papeete Riots; Seoul, South Korea - 1994 Seoul Riots; London, England - Poll tax riots; Los Angeles, CA - 1992 Los Angeles Riots
4	"Train Wrecks"	May 25, 1999	6.51
5	"Getting a Ticket in America (aka Tickets In America)"	January 6, 2000	9.93
6	"World's Most Dangerous Police Chases"	November 7, 2002	5.56
7	"World's Fastest Police Chases"	November 14, 2002	4.35
8	"World's Craziest Police Chases"	April 1, 2003 (Sky One – UK); June 28, 2003 (Fox – USA)	4.77
Both TV Tango and Newspapers referred to the special as the "World's Wildest Police Chases". However, the Nielsen ratings refer to its correct name.

=== Season 1 (1998) ===
No. overall	No. in season	Title	Original release date	U.S. viewers (millions)
1	1	"High Speed Car Chase"	April 2, 1998	13.36
2	2	"Russian Mafia Footage"	April 9, 1998	11.99
3	3	"California Riots"	April 16, 1998	10.60
4	4	"Montana Car Chase"	April 23, 1998	10.95
5	5	"Riot in Tahiti!"	April 30, 1998	9.47
6	6	"Armed with a Sword!"	May 7, 1998	8.51

=== Season 2 (1998–99) ===
No. overall	No. in season	Title	Original release date	U.S. viewers (millions)
7	1	"Longest Prison Riot in History"	September 10, 1998	8.36
8	2	"Soccer Game Riot"	September 17, 1998	9.07
9	3	"Armed Standoff"	September 24, 1998	7.35
10	4	"Riots in Nicaragua"	October 15, 1998	6.05
11	5	"Amazing Police Chases and Car Crashes"	November 5, 1998	12.97
12	6	"Massive Fireworks Disaster"	November 12, 1998	12.31
13	7	"Helicopter Pursuit"	December 3, 1998	9.27
14	8	"Bank Heist"	December 10, 1998	10.33
15	9	"ATM Robbery"	January 7, 1999	10.26
16	10	"Riot at College Football Game"	January 14, 1999	10.88
17	11	"Riots in Brazil"	January 28, 1999	9.45
18	12	"Store Robbery Footage"	February 11, 1999	9.99
19	13	"Hostage Situation Footage"	February 18, 1999	11.54
20	14	"Hostage Situation in Brazil"	March 11, 1999	11.75
21	15	"Mugging Footage"	March 25, 1999	9.46
22	16	"Belligerent Drunk Driver"	April 8, 1999	7.80
23	17	"Trapped in Burning Vehicle"	June 24, 1999	7.31
24	18	"Hate March"	July 1, 1999	7.79
25	19	"Jumper"	July 8, 1999	7.56
26	20	"Resisting Arrest"	July 15, 1999	7.02

=== Season 3 (1999–00) ===
No. overall	No. in season	Title	Original release date	U.S. viewers (millions)
27	1	"Brazen Bank Robber"	September 16, 1999	8.37
28	2	"World's Worst Drivers!"	September 23, 1999	6.83
29	3	"Most Dangerous Crashes!"	September 30, 1999	6.79
30	4	"Football Riot in the Netherlands"	October 21, 1999	6.01
31	5	"High-Speed Chases"	December 10, 1999	8.25
32	6	"Grieving Father Attacks His Son's Killers"	January 7, 2000	8.48
33	7	"Most Dangerous Chases!"	January 14, 2000	9.58
34	8	"Strangest Police Chases"	January 28, 2000	11.52
35	9	"Arson Footage"	February 4, 2000	9.02
36	10	"Riots in Australia!"	February 11, 2000	8.16
37	11	"Mailman Hires Hitman"	February 18, 2000	7.81
38	12	"Riots in Kenya!"	February 25, 2000	8.55

=== Season 4 (2000–01) ===
The show's title was shortened to Police Videos for this season only.

No. overall	No. in season	Title	Original release date	U.S. viewers (millions)
39	1	"Dangerous Crashes and Chases"	October 6, 2000	8.97
40	2	"Craziest Chases"	October 13, 2000	7.95
41	3	"Robbers on the Run"	October 20, 2000	7.59
42	4	"California Police Videos"	November 3, 2000	8.76
43	5	"Armed Parolee"	November 10, 2000	8.86
44	6	"Cop Killer"	November 17, 2000	9.90
45	7	"Wanted Drug Dealer"	January 5, 2001	9.54
46	8	"Backroad Pursuit"	January 12, 2001	8.32
47	9	"Liquor Store Robbery Footage"	February 2, 2001	8.51
48	10	"Truck Theft"	February 9, 2001	9.43
49	11	"Parole Violation"	February 16, 2001	9.44
50	12	"Speed in Real Life?"	March 16, 2001	7.81
51	13	"Fleeing Crooks Get Caught"	March 23, 2001	8.12
52	14	"Nevada Police Chase"	April 27, 2001	6.58
53	15	"Muggers in Michigan"	May 4, 2001	6.27
54	16	"Convenience Store Crooks"	May 11, 2001	5.70
55	17	"Shooting Outside the White House"	July 20, 2001	4.94
56	18	"Armed Drug Dealer"	July 27, 2001	4.88

=== Season 5 (2012) ===
No. overall	No. in season	Title	Original release date	U.S. viewers (millions)
57	1	"Episode 501 – One Bullet Away from Insanity"	May 7, 2012	0.604
58	2	"Episode 502 – Between a Diamond and a Hard Place"	May 14, 2012	0.532
59	3	"Episode 503 – Driving While Crazy"	May 21, 2012	N/A
60	4	"Episode 504 – Sky High on Rage"	May 28, 2012	N/A
61	5	"Episode 505 – Locking Horns with the Law"	June 11, 2012	N/A
62	6	"Episode 506 – Roaring Into Hot Pursuit"	June 18, 2012	N/A
63	7	"Episode 507 – Guns Speak Louder Than Words"	June 25, 2012	N/A
64	8	"Episode 508 – Crookbook"	July 9, 2012	N/A
65	9	"Episode 509 – Soft Targets Hard Lessons"	July 16, 2012	N/A
66	10	"Episode 510 – Between the Crosshairs"	July 23, 2012	0.899
67	11	"Episode 511 – Revenge of the K9s"	July 30, 2012	0.782
68	12	"Episode 512 – Rebel Without a Clue"	August 6, 2012	0.902
69	13	"Episode 513 – Thick as Thieves"	August 13, 2012	0.677

== Video game ==
A video game based on the series was released for the PlayStation in 2001, entitled World's Scariest Police Chases, also featuring Bunnell. The game received mixed reviews, ranging from a 3.6/10 from GameSpot.com, to a 9/10 from Official PlayStation Magazine (UK).

== In popular culture ==
In the Family Guy episode "Quagmire's Baby", there is a sequence of Fred Flintstone fleeing from the police in the family car, in an episode of World's Wildest Police Videos. Flintstone crashes, and attempts to flee on foot, but is delayed by the Hanna-Barbera skidaddle running effect. A similar sequence was used in the episode "Something, Something, Something, Dark Side", when Star Wars' TIE fighters and a Star Destroyer were chasing the Millennium Falcon. These sequences were narrated by Bunnell himself.

It was also parodied on MADtv as "World's Queeniest Police Chases".

Some of the Alarm für Cobra 11 - Die Autobahnpolizei, Der Clown and one from Die Wache car crashing clips were used in 2 episodes in 1998.

The show appears to be a source of inspiration for the in-game television show "The Underbelly of Paradise" in the video game Grand Theft Auto V.

== Worldwide syndication ==
=== Americas ===
- United States: April 2, 1998 – September 7, 2001 on Fox. The series was syndicated on local stations, such as UPN, both CourtTV/TruTV from 2002 to 2011, and on Spike TV/Spike until 2015. The series is currently airing on Busted. It was also seen as World's Most Dramatic Police Chases in the early morning on TNT. Spanish language re-runs were also syndicated on Telemundo under "Acción Extrema".
- Mexico: Televisa
- Latin America: truTV Latin America
- Canada: mentv, CourtTV Canada

=== Europe ===
- Hungary: Viasat 6
- Sweden: Aired and rerun on ZTV.
- Norway: Viasat 4
- Germany: on RTL, called Im Einsatz, die spektakulärsten Polizei-Videos der Welt, commentated by former American police officer Stephan T. Rose.
- Ireland: TV3
- Iceland: SkjárEinn (2000–2001)
- United Kingdom: Bravo, ITV4, Channel 5, Men & Motors and CBS Reality
- Greece: Skai TV
- Italy: AXN Italy
- Czech Republic: TV Prima

=== Asia ===
- Indonesia: antv, NET.
- United Arab Emirates: MBC Action
- Malaysia: Star TV
- Philippines: Studio 23, Maxxx
- Thailand: UBC series

=== Malaysia ===
- Malaysia: TV3

=== Oceania ===
- Australia: Some premiere episodes were shown on the Seven Network and Network Ten, and re-runs of all episodes appeared on Fox8. Episodes of the 2012 series began airing on the Seven Network in 2013.

=== Africa ===
- South Africa: DStv

== Home media ==
There were also home video releases on VHS of the first three World's Scariest Police Chases around late 1997, which included never-before-seen footage that wasn't shown on FOX. The specials would be re-released as Deluxe Versions in the late 1990s, with minor differences.

In early April 2023, it was announced that New York-based streaming provider FilmRise had acquired the digital distribution rights to the entire series from Pursuit Productions, it was made available on their streaming service and on iTunes/Apple TV, which included some of the additional specials that premiered during the shows original run. Between April–July 2023, FilmRise would upload the entire series to their "FilmRise True Crime" YouTube channel, releasing full episodes of the show on a weekly basis. Between July–August 2023, some of the additional specials were also uploaded to the channel, with the specials (excluding World's Scariest Police Chases) being incorrectly labeled as "Season 6".

The series and its specials are also available for streaming online on The Roku Channel, Amazon Prime Video/Amazon Freevee (with the exception of fourth season), Pluto TV (United Kingdom only) and Plex (second and fifth seasons only).

It will be made available on FilmRise's streaming partners Crackle, Tubi, Peacock and Xumo Play in the future.

It is also available to stream as a FAST channel on Amazon’s Freevee, Rakuten TV and Plex streaming services.
