= Xerox murders =

Mass shooting in Hawaii, US

- The Xerox building in the aftermath of the shootings
- Location: 21.3200°N 157.8764°W; 1200 N. Nimitz Highway; Honolulu, Hawaii 96817; United States
- Date: November 2, 1999; 08:00 a.m. (HST)
- Attack type: Mass shooting; mass murder; workplace shooting
- Weapon: Glock 17
- Deaths: 7
- Injuries: 0
- Perpetrator: Byran Uyesugi
- Motive: Revenge
- Charges: Murder, 1st Degree (1 count); Attempted Murder, 2nd Degree (1 count)
- Verdict: Guilty on all counts
- Convictions: June 13, 2000

On November 2, 1999, a mass shooting occurred in a Xerox Corporation building in Honolulu, Hawaii, United States. Service technician Byran Koji Uyesugi fatally shot seven men (six co-workers and his supervisor) inside the Xerox building. It is the deadliest mass shooting and mass murder in the history of Hawaii.

== Shooting ==
At 8:00 in the morning, Byran Koji Uyesugi, a service technician working at Xerox, opened fire inside the building with a semi-automatic pistol, killing his supervisor and six co-workers, and fired in the direction of another co-worker who fled the building. The eighth person escaped without injury. He fired 28 shots in total, 25 of which hit a person.

After the shooting, Uyesugi fled in a company van, and by mid-morning, he was found sitting in the van near the Hawaii Nature Center in Makiki, above downtown Honolulu. He held a standoff with police that lasted for five hours, during which he brandished a pistol, read magazines and smoked cigarettes. Adding to the tension of the standoff, the Hawaii Nature Center was hosting thirty-five local school children, who were trapped inside without food or water. Uyesugi surrendered to police at approximately 3:00 p.m. HST.

=== Victims ===
- Jason Balatico, 33
- Ford Kanehira, 41
- Ronald Kataoka, 50
- Ronald Kawamae, 54
- Melvin Lee, 58
- Peter Mark, 46
- John Sakamoto, 36

== Perpetrator ==
Born in Honolulu in 1959, Byran Koji Uyesugi grew up in the Nuuanu neighborhood. While attending Roosevelt High School, Uyesugi was a member of the school's Army JROTC chapter and the school's rifle team. Classmates remembered him as a quiet student who never got into trouble. According to his brother Dennis, Uyesugi crashed their father's car and hit his head on the windshield shortly after graduating high school in 1977; he was never the same afterwards.

Uyesugi had been employed by Xerox as a technician since 1984. Among his hobbies was raising and breeding goldfish and koi, which he would sell to local pet stores. He had an extensive collection of firearms. At the time of the murders he had as many as 25 guns registered in his name, dating to 1982. Police also took eleven handguns, five rifles and two shotguns from Uyesugi's father.

According to testimony from Uyesugi's father, Hiroyuki, Uyesugi was normal until he started working for Xerox in 1984. In 1988, Byran started to complain that he had a poking sensation in his head.

After being transferred to another workgroup, Uyesugi began making unfounded accusations of harassment and product tampering against fellow repairmen. They had difficulty dealing with him. Former co-workers who knew him reported the other members of his team allegedly ostracized him, making him feel isolated and withdrawn. Uyesugi reportedly made threats against other co-workers' lives. In 1993, he was ordered to undergo psychiatric evaluation and anger management courses after he kicked in and damaged an elevator door. Uyesugi was arrested for third-degree criminal property damage. Co-workers told Dr. Michael Welner, chairman of the Forensic Panel and the forensic psychiatrist who interviewed Uyesugi prior to trial, that as early as 1995, Uyesugi was openly talking of carrying out a mass shooting at the workplace were he to be fired. He complained that his co-workers were engaged in patterns of harassment, backstabbing behavior, and spreading of rumors.

In the period leading up to the shootings, Xerox management had become increasingly committed to phasing out the type of photocopier that Uyesugi serviced. He resisted learning the replacement machine, fearing that he could not keep up with its technical demands. After working around his refusal to train on the new machine, Uyesugi's manager insisted on November 1, 1999, that he would begin training the next day. In his interview with Dr. Michael Welner, who examined Uyesugi when the defendant brought an insanity defense, Uyesugi said he had believed that if he refused to take the training, management would fire him. He told Dr. Welner, "I decided to give them a reason to fire me."

== Trial ==
Forty-year-old Byran Uyesugi's month-long trial began on May 15, 2000. He was charged with one count of murder in the first degree (count 1), seven counts of murder in the second degree (counts 2–8), and one count of attempted murder in the second degree (count 9). Prior to the close of the trial, counts 2-8 were merged into count 1.

The Prosecuting Attorney of Honolulu Peter Carlisle and Deputy Prosecuting Attorneys Christopher Van Marter and Kevin Takata represented the State of Hawaii. Criminal Defense Attorneys Jerel Fonseca and Rodney Ching of the law firm Fonseca & Ching represented Uyesugi.

Uyesugi pleaded not guilty by reason of insanity and claimed that he felt like an outcast at work and that he feared his colleagues were conspiring to have him fired. Dr. Park Dietz and Dr. Daryl Matthews testified for the defense that he was insane, citing the delusions about how others were tampering with his fish. Lead prosecution expert witness Dr. Harold Hall testified that the Defendant fulfilled the criteria for a diagnosis of schizophrenia, but he did not meet the criteria for either insanity or extreme emotional or mental disturbance (EMED). Dr. Michael Welner testified for the prosecution that although Uyesugi was, in his opinion, legitimately suffering the effects of schizophrenia, he carried out the shooting because he was angry that he would be fired for insubordination and his own account of concealment before the crime demonstrated that his actions were premeditated.

On June 13, 2000, the jury rejected the insanity defense, finding Uyesugi guilty on count 1 for the seven murders and count 9 for the attempted murder. On August 8, 2000, Judge Marie N. Milks sentenced Uyesugi to life without the possibility of parole for count 1 and life with the possibility of parole on count 9, with the sentences to run consecutively. The court also ordered Uyesugi to pay $500 in restitution and $70,000 to the crime victim compensation fund. Hawaii does not have the death penalty. The parole board later ordered Uyesugi to serve a minimum term of 235 years in prison, the longest ever ordered for a Hawaii inmate.

Uyesugi appealed his convictions. In 2002, the State of Hawaii Supreme Court upheld Uyesugi's conviction. In 2004, Uyesugi was considering fighting his conviction based on Rule 40, inadequate representation by his lawyers in his first trial.

In 2005, Xerox and the hospital that examined Uyesugi settled a civil lawsuit brought by the families of the shooting victims. They believed that both parties had failed to take preventive action based on what they said were clear signs of Uyesugi's mental instability.

As of October 31, 2023, Uyesugi was incarcerated at the Saguaro Correctional Center in Eloy, Arizona.

== Aftermath ==
Xerox vacated the premises at 1200 N. Nimitz Highway after the shooting. This facility was vacant until 2004, when the producers of the TV show Lost built a sound stage there to film indoor scenes. Dal-Tile currently leases the property from the Harry and Jeanette Weinberg Foundation for its tile and natural stone showroom.

The state legislature passed a law that requires doctors to reveal information about the mental state of persons applying to buy guns.

== See also ==
- 1996 Honolulu hostage crisis
