= Something, Something, Something, Dark Side =

- Family Guy episode
- Episode poster parodies Noriyoshi Ohrai's international poster art for The Empire Strikes Back
- Episode no.: Season 8 Episode 20
- Directed by: Dominic Polcino
- Written by: Kirker Butler
- Production codes: 6ACX21; 6ACX22
- Original air date: May 23, 2010 (Note: The episode was first released in Something, Something, Something, Dark Side DVD on December 22, 2009.)

Guest appearances
- Jon Benjamin as Carl/Yoda; John Bunnell as himself; James Caan as himself; Jackson Douglas; Joe Flaherty as Western Union worker; Phil LaMarr; Dolph Lundgren (live action); Brigitte Nielsen (live action); Michael Pataki (live action); Kevin Michael Richardson as Strong Black Man; George Rogan; Tom Selleck as himself (live action); James Woods as himself/General Veers

Episode chronology
← Previous "The Splendid Source"	Next → "Partial Terms of Endearment"
- Family Guy season 8

"Something, Something, Something, Dark Side" is a direct-to-video special of the animated series Family Guy, which later served as the 20th episode of the show's eighth season, and is the second part of the series' Star Wars parody trilogy Laugh It Up, Fuzzball. It originally was released on DVD and Blu-ray Disc on December 22, 2009, and later aired on Fox in the United States on May 23, 2010. The episode is a retelling and parody of the 1980 Star Wars film sequel The Empire Strikes Back, recasting characters from Family Guy into roles from the film.

The episode was written by Kirker Butler and directed by Dominic Polcino. It received high praise from critics for its accurate depiction of the original film, as well as its inclusion of many cultural references. According to Nielsen ratings, it was viewed in 6.13 million homes in its original airing. The episode featured guest performances by Jon Benjamin, John Bunnell, James Caan, Jackson Douglas, Joe Flaherty, Phil LaMarr, Kevin Michael Richardson, George Rogan and James Woods, along with several recurring guest voice actors for the series.

== Plot ==
As the Griffin family is watching television, the power suddenly goes out again, leading Peter to retell the story of The Empire Strikes Back.

After the "opening crawl" an Imperial Star Destroyer deploys a series of probe droids in search of the Rebel Alliance. One of the probe droids (Joe) lands on the ice planet Hoth, where the Rebels have set up a base. Rebel commander Luke Skywalker (Chris) is patrolling when a large wampa (Cookie Monster) attacks him and takes him back to its lair. At the base, Han Solo (Peter) announces his intention to leave the Rebellion to Princess Leia (Lois) and Carlist Rieekan (Dr. Hartman), with Leia objecting to his decision. However, she denies it when confronted, saying she would rather kiss George Takei. When he finds out that Luke has not yet returned, Han sets out on his "Dondon" to find him. Luke escapes the wampa lair and has a vision of his late mentor Obi-Wan Kenobi (Herbert), who tells him to go to the Dagobah system to learn the ways of the Force from Jedi Master Yoda, after offering him a bowl of Zima soup. Han quickly locates Luke, and the two are rescued soon after.

Soon after, the Empire discovers the Rebel base, and Darth Vader (Stewie) orders an attack. The Imperial fleet exits hyperspace too early, giving the Rebels time to evacuate the base while Luke leads his squadron of snowspeeders to hold off the Empire's battalion of Imperial Walkers. Imperial stormtroopers break into the base, forcing Han to escape in the Millennium Falcon with Leia, C-3PO (Quagmire) and Chewbacca (Brian), while Luke escapes in his X-wing with R2-D2 (Cleveland), stopping to see R2's niece's violin recital. The Millennium Falcon enters an asteroid field and Han decides to dock inside a cave to repair the ship. They flee when they discover they have actually landed in the belly of a space slug (Meg). Meanwhile, Luke crash-lands in the swamps of Dagobah and finds Yoda (Carl) amid the foggy landscape. Yoda trains Luke, guiding him through a series of training exercises, including watching "sweet-ass DVD releases", and a training montage that parodies Rocky IV.

Darth Vader is ordered by the Emperor (Carter) to capture Luke and turn him to the dark side of the Force. Vader recruits bounty hunters to track down and capture Luke's friends, intending to use them as bait to trap Luke, including Raggedy Andy, whom he orders to leave. With the Millennium Falcon's hyperdrive broken, Han and company escape by hiding amongst a field of disposed trash, but are tracked by Boba Fett (Ernie the Giant Chicken), after hitting a "space bum" collecting some of the garbage. Luke has a premonition that his friends are in danger and leaves Dagobah to save them, although he has not finished his Jedi training. Yoda initially doesn't want him to go, but encourages it after Luke suggests Yoda fight Vader himself.

Han and the others go to Cloud City on the planet Bespin to obtain help from Han's friend Lando Calrissian (Mort), "the only black guy in the galaxy", only to be turned over to Darth Vader. Han willingly reveals the location of Luke and the Rebel base but is tortured by being forced to listen to Paula Cole's "Where Have All the Cowboys Gone?", as punishment for clogging a toilet on the 16th floor of Cloud City, which forced Vader to use the "little pig people's" bathroom. Han is used to test a carbon freezing chamber Vader intends to use on Luke to take him to the Emperor. Leia professes her love to Han, but Han tells her to "fuck off" and is then frozen in carbonite for posterity. Lando later double-crosses the Empire, freeing Leia, Chewbacca and C-3PO, motivating the guards with a pizza party. Despite R2-D2 having sex with the combination lock, and subsequently being discovered by her husband, to get the door open, they are too late to stop Boba Fett from flying off with Han. Luke arrives at Cloud City and, after being briefly interrupted by Ryan Seacrest on American Idol, engages Vader in a lightsaber duel. Vader cuts off Luke's right hand. With Luke cornered and defenseless, Vader goads Luke to join the dark side, revealing that he is his father. Luke casts himself into an air shaft and, after discovering that a worker has shoved his severed hand down his pants, ends up hanging on an antenna beneath the city, calling out to Ben, Leia, and Tom Selleck. Leia senses Luke's call from within the Millennium Falcon and has him rescued. On board a Nebulon-B frigate, Luke is fitted with an artificial hand, but told to practice masturbating with a hot dog first. Lando, dressed in Han's clothes, sets off with Chewbacca on the Millennium Falcon to rescue Han. Luke angrily protests the story's ambiguous ending, but then he receives a letter from Doc Brown, a reference to the ending of Back to the Future Part II.

In the Griffins' home, the power returns as Peter finishes his story, only to get into another argument with Chris over Robot Chicken. Chris vows to not let Peter get to him this time, but eventually storms off when Peter brings up Without a Paddle.

== Production and development ==
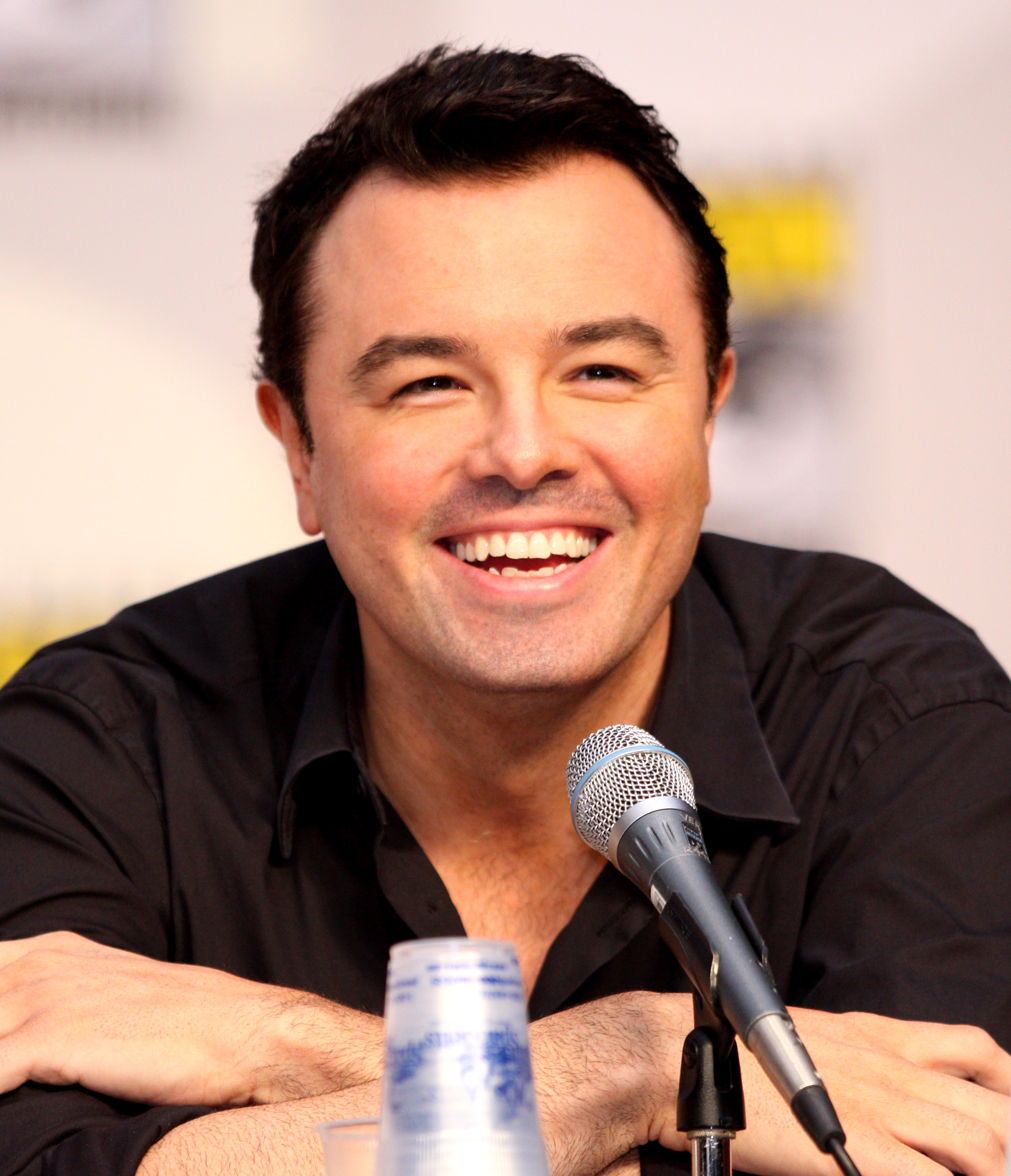
Family Guy creator Seth MacFarlane served as executive producer for the episode.

The episode was written by series regular Kirker Butler, before the 2007–2008 Writers Guild of America strike, and before his leave from the series in order to become co-executive producer of the Family Guy spinoff series The Cleveland Show. Butler wrote the first draft of the episode in four weeks, under the guidance of series creator Seth MacFarlane. The episode was directed by Dominic Polcino, who had previously directed "Blue Harvest". This was the last episode in the series to use hand-drawn animatics, before transitioning to computer-designed animatics.

In addition to the regular cast, voice actor Jon Benjamin reprised his role as Carl, who portrays Yoda, and Sheriff John Bunnell made his second appearance in the series, the first being in the eighth season episode "Quagmire's Baby". Actor James Woods, in his third appearance in the series, as an exaggerated version of himself, guest starred. Actors James Caan, Jackson Douglas and Joe Flaherty, along with voice actors Phil LaMarr, Kevin Michael Richardson and George Rogan made appearances. Recurring guest voice actors Johnny Brennan, Chris Cox, Ralph Garman, Wally Wingert, writers Kirker Butler, Danny Smith, Alec Sulkin, John Viener, writer and showrunner Mark Hentemann, and producer Chris Sheridan also made minor appearances in the episode. Live-action clips of actor Dolph Lundgren, actress Brigitte Nielsen and actor Michael Pataki from the film Rocky IV, and actor Tom Selleck from the film Her Alibi were also used in multiple sequences throughout the episode.

The DVD release of "Blue Harvest" on January 15, 2008, contained an easter egg of a brief read through of bits from "Something, Something, Something, Dark Side", as well as a teaser trailer for the episode as another easter egg.

The title of this episode is a reference to a specific line from the season five episode "Barely Legal", which was used in a cutaway relating to Star Wars. The line is an inside joke relating to the Emperor "figuring out the formula for great dialogue" for Star Wars. While the Emperor talks to a kneeling Darth Vader, he says "Something, something, something, dark side. Something, something, something, complete". "Barely Legal" was written by Kirker Butler, who also wrote this episode.

== Cultural references ==
As the episode opens with a shot of the Griffin family, they are seen sitting in front of the television watching a parody of several Aaron Sorkin shows, including Studio 60 on the Sunset Strip, entitled The Kitchen. Once the scene ends, the power unexpectedly goes out, to which Stewie responds by asking "What are we in, Iraq?" Reminiscent of the previous Star Wars-inspired episode, "Blue Harvest", Meg insists her father tell another story about Star Wars. Peter then begins to retell the film Black Snake Moan before being interrupted by Stewie and Chris.

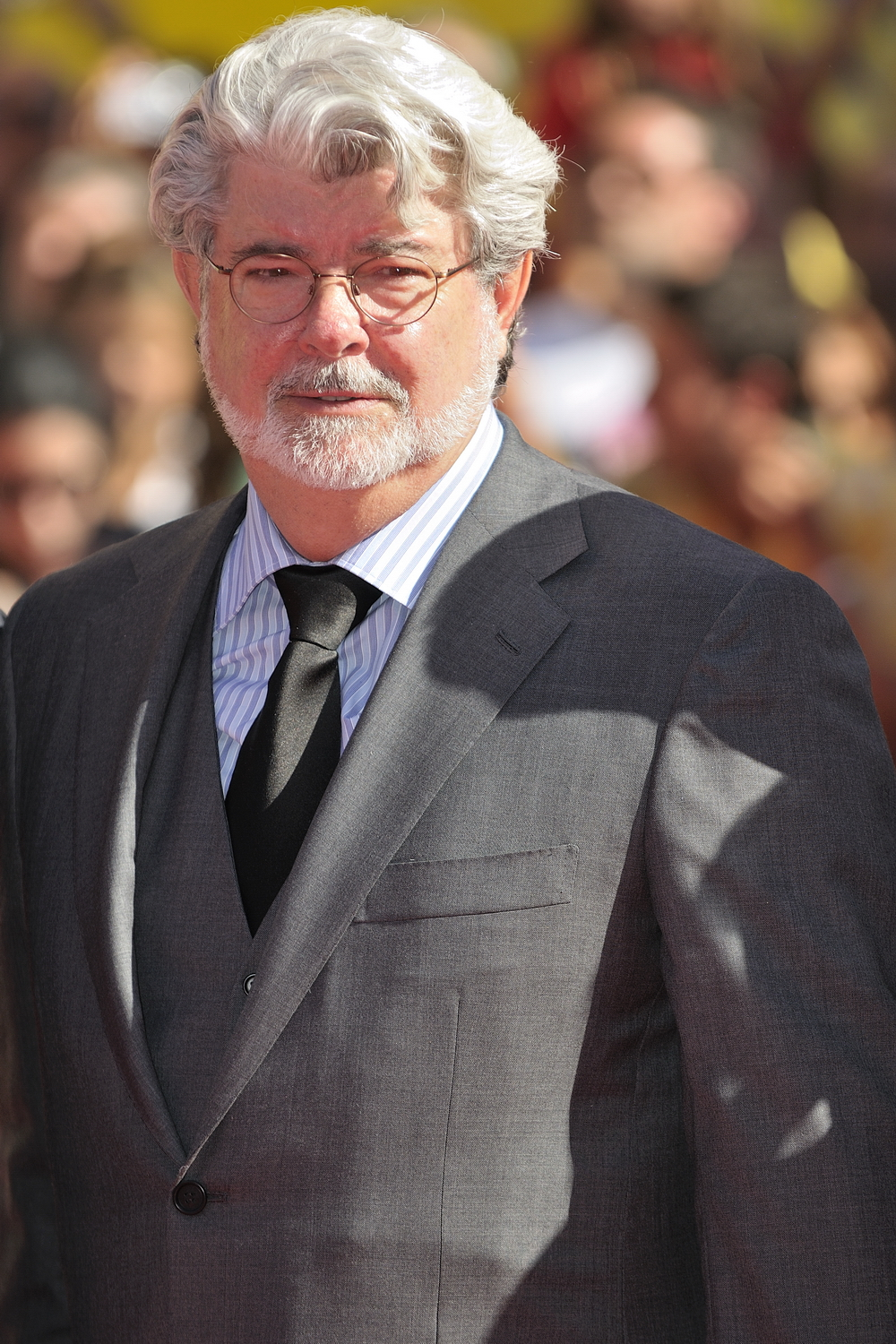
Star Wars creator George Lucas.

In the same fashion as the original Star Wars films, the story opens with a large, yellow crawl of text, with the text in this variation calling out 20th Century Fox for their lack of foresight in terms of merchandising rights, thus allowing George Lucas and Lucasfilm to keep all the rights to every film in the Star Wars franchise. The text then addresses the stockholders of 20th Century Fox, and cites Family Guy's two cancellations as another example of the company's short-sighted decisions, and spending budget money in a useless manner. As the Imperial Fleet approaches, a Star Destroyer deploys Elroy Jetson, a character from the Hanna-Barbera animated sitcom The Jetsons, along with a series of probe droids. Elroy Jetson proceeds to the Little Dipper School, in imitation of the original intro to The Jetsons. One of the probe droids, portrayed by Joe Swanson, then lands in the snow near Luke Skywalker. Luke mistakes the droid for a meteorite and approaches the device, before being attacked by a snow beast, which looks like Cookie Monster from PBS' Sesame Street. The character had previously appeared in the fourth season episode "Model Misbehavior" as a "cookie addict".

Before leaving, Han Solo runs into Princess Leia, who insists on Han staying with her. Apologizing to Leia for having to leave her, Han gives her his e-mail address, which is hosted by the nearly defunct company CompuServe at "hansolo64@compuserve.com." Han Solo then questions why Leia wants him to stay, and suggests that she is afraid that she will not get a "goodbye kiss" before he leaves. Leia then mulls over the thought, and tells him that she would rather kiss Star Trek actor George Takei. Abruptly entering, C-3PO and R2-D2 alert Han Solo of Luke Skywalker's disappearance. Han goes out to look for Luke on his "Dondon", which has the body of a tauntaun, and the head of actor Don Knotts. Once Han locates Luke, comedian Rodney Dangerfield appears, to which Han responds, "There are way too many elderly comedians out here in the snow." Before being rescued, Han first appears in a 1980s commercial for the chewing gum Juicy Fruit, with the original audio from the commercial and Juicy Fruit's current logo. The sequence was originally planned for the fifth season episode "Road to Rupert", with Stewie and Brian taking the place of Peter.

Continuing on their approach to the Hoth system, the Imperial Fleet passes by a mailbox with the surname 'Nimoy' on it. Darth Vader, as portrayed by Stewie, hits the mailbox with a baseball bat as the ship passes. As the Imperial Walkers, or "robot camels", begin to approach the rebels, one of the rebels looks through his binoculars at the group of robots and spots one of the Walkers wearing Crocs, a type of shoe reminiscent of the wooden clog but made out of plastic. When Luke's aircraft is shot down during the battle, he contacts OnStar, a company that provides vehicle security. As Han decides to outrun a series of TIE fighters, Sheriff John Bunnell then begins narrating the chase, in a parody of World's Wildest Police Videos, which Bunnell hosted from 1998 to 2002. This is Family Guy's second reference to the show, as well as Bunnell's second appearance in the series. His first appearance was in "Quagmire's Baby", which first aired shortly before the DVD release of "Something, Something, Something, Dark Side". Han then seemingly goes through an asteroid field, much to Leia's chagrin. Han responds by stating that it is better than going through the nearby strawberry field, with The Beatles members John Lennon, Paul McCartney, Ringo Starr and George Harrison then appearing. The other Beatles are then seen teasing Paul about Heather Mills having one leg, calling her "Peg" and "Eileen". After much maneuvering, Han is able to escape the TIE fighters, eventually parking in a handicapped zone, citing vertigo as his medical condition. This leads Leia to question Han's decision making, and causes Han to film a "video confession" similar to those on the MTV reality show The Real World.

When Luke reaches the Dagobah system, he crash lands into a swamp, prompting Allstate spokesperson and actor Dennis Haysbert to appear, in a parody of his commercials. Haysbert was reportedly approached to voice himself, but rejected the offer for unspecified reasons. Later getting out of the crashed ship, R2-D2 is eaten and spat back out by a swamp monster, prompting R2 to question what else is located beneath the swamp water. The Legion of Doom lair then rises from the swamp, which angers Luke. After Luke meets him, Yoda, as portrayed by Carl, reveals that the secret to mastering the Force is to "check out sweet-ass DVD releases", and goes on to reference several films, including National Lampoon's Van Wilder and Iron Man, as well as Iron Man's director Jon Favreau. A montage depicts Luke performing various athletic feats under Yoda's guidance, interlaced with clips of Dolph Lundgren as Ivan Drago from the 1985 film Rocky IV. Going on to test Luke's knowledge of various films, Yoda begins to ask the best and worst "naked chick" scenes, with Luke responding by citing the best as Rebecca De Mornay in Risky Business, and the worst as Kathy Bates in About Schmidt. Yoda then asks about the best scene in the 1985 film Teen Wolf and Luke picks the scene in which Michael J. Fox in wolf make-up opens the bathroom door to see his father is also a werewolf. Yoda says Luke is correct, but that he also would have accepted the end celebration in which an extra allegedly exposes himself.

Once the Emperor, portrayed by Carter Pewterschmidt, contacts Darth Vader, he first begins by telling him that he is getting rid of all his CDs because he is "downloading all his music to his new iPod", then proceeds to list several albums, including singer Natalie Merchant's 1995 album Tigerlily, Alanis Morissette's album Jagged Little Pill, and finally Richard Marx's single "Hold On to the Nights", the last of which Darth Vader excitedly agrees to take. Calling upon various bounty hunters, Darth Vader reviews a lineup of auditioning hunters, including Dog the Bounty Hunter, IG-88, Zuckuss, Bossk, Boba Fett as portrayed by the Giant Chicken, and finally Raggedy Andy, who Vader angrily dismisses. During a confrontation with Han, Darth Vader deflects lasers using his gloves and sings the theme song from the Wonder Woman television series. Once Han Solo is captured by Darth Vader, he is tortured into confessing his clogging one of the bathrooms on Cloud City. Vader then forces Han to listen to Paula Cole's "Where Have All the Cowboys Gone?" on full blast. When Luke lands on Cloud City to fight Vader, he is first subjected to appearing on the popular reality competition American Idol, with Ryan Seacrest as host of the ensuing "lightsaber battle" before he is quickly killed by Luke. After losing his battle against Darth Vader, Luke falls to the bottom of the floating city and calls out for Leia, along with Obi-Wan and actor Tom Selleck, the last of which is then seen briefly looking up from his book in a real-life cameo from the movie Her Alibi. Sensing this, Leia then orders Chewbacca to turn the ship around, prompting a parody of Vicki Sue Robinson's single "Turn The Beat Around", reworded to "Turn the Ship Around".

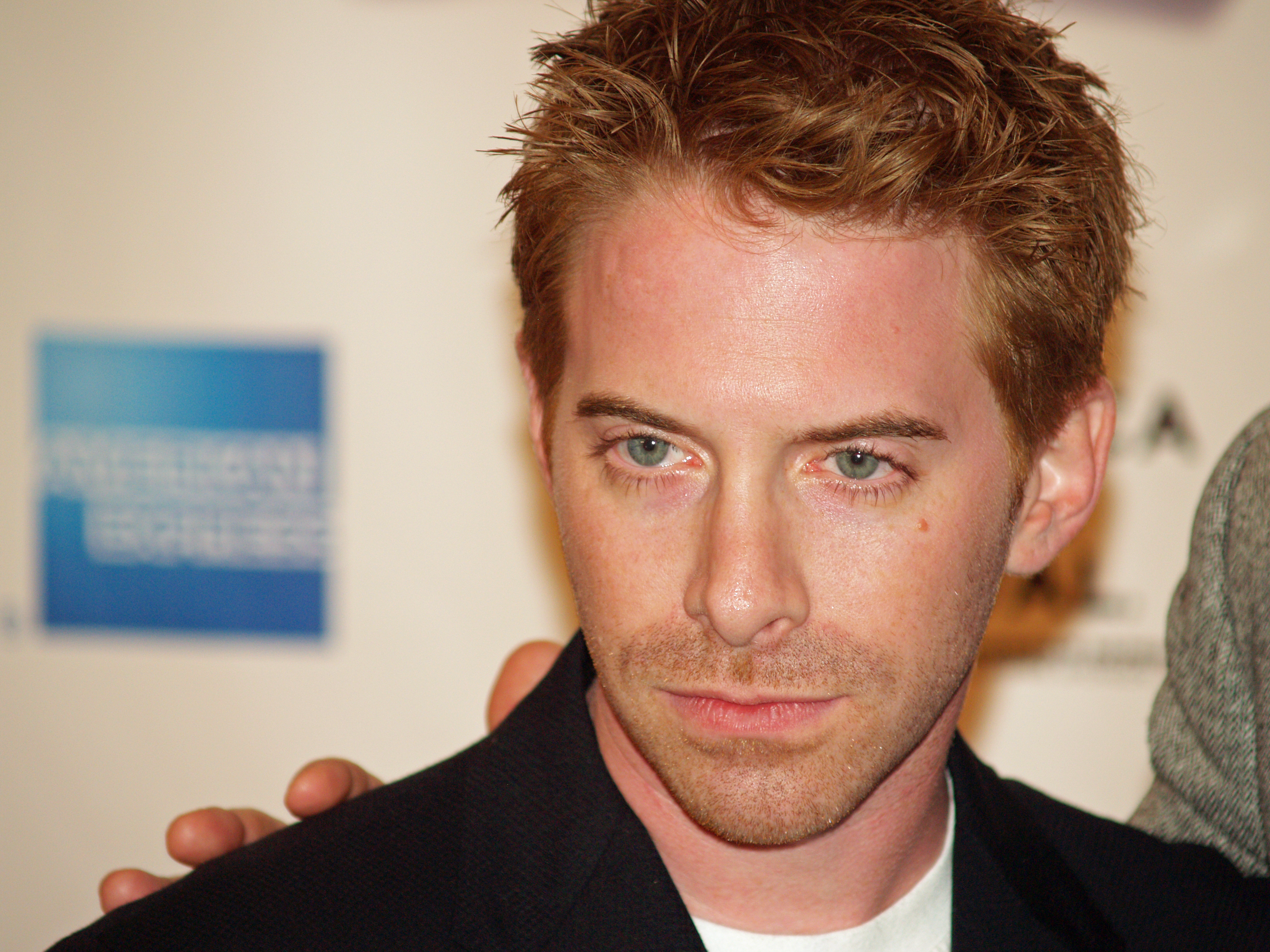
Seth Green also created a series of Star Wars episodes for Robot Chicken.

As the story comes to a close, Luke interrupts the ending sequence and raises the viewer's awareness to all of the "unanswered questions" that the movie leaves behind. The Western Union postal worker from the 1989 film Back to the Future Part II then appears, and hands Luke a message delivered by Doc Brown from the year 1885, with the story then ending on the words "To be Concluded", in the same fashion of Back to the Future. Composer Alan Silvestri allowed the producers to use his Back to the Future theme since he's a fan of Family Guy.

The episode then cuts back to the Griffin family household, with Peter immediately rehashing the argument between him and Chris that first started in "Blue Harvest", a joke grounded in the fact that Chris' voice actor, Seth Green, is one of the creators and producers of the stop motion comedy series Robot Chicken. Peter begins by suggesting that Robot Chicken would never be able to top the story he had just told. Hearing this, Chris defends Robot Chicken. Peter continues to poke at Chris and finally states that he "may have more time to tell another story" entitled Without a Paddle, a critically panned movie in which Seth Green starred. Chris then angrily storms off yelling "Fuck you" to Peter.

== Reception ==
In a significant decrease from the previous episode, "Something, Something, Something, Dark Side" was viewed in 6.13 million homes in its first half-hour, and 6.39 in its second (previous episode was viewed in 7.59 million homes). It aired simultaneously with the season finale of The Celebrity Apprentice on NBC, the series finale of Lost on ABC, and Brooks & Dunn – The Last Rodeo on CBS. The episode acquired a 3.0 and 3.2 rating, in the first and second half-hours respectively, in the 18–49 demographic. The episode beat the season finales of The Simpsons and The Cleveland Show in both the 18–49 demographic and in total viewership.

Reviews of the television broadcast were highly positive, praising its close attention to detail in parodying the original film. Jason Hughes of TV Squad found the episode to be "incredibly [impressive]," going on to note, "As much as we fans love the films, we know they're not perfect, and that they're downright ridiculous in places. Family Guy managed to point out virtually all of those moments in this parody." Emily VanDerWerff of The A.V. Club found the episode to have "a lot of solid laughs", and admired the show for "throwing itself into these outsized movie parody things". Critics of the DVD and Blu-ray Disc releases gave the episode high praise for its ability to accurately reflect the original film. Cindy White of IGN gave the episode an 8 out of 10, noting that it "lives up to its predecessor and, like the film it spoofs, arguably exceeds it in some ways". John Scott Lewinski of Wired praised the faithfulness to the original film, saying that it "becomes clear that MacFarlane and his writers are legit Star Wars fans". Adam Rosenberg of MTV Movies Blog called the episode "hilarious" and Paul Semel of Metromix praised the episode for featuring "some very ribald humor", and "[skewering] the original movie with some rather insightful moments". In a subsequent review of Family Guy's eighth season, Ramsey Isler of IGN listed "Something, Something, Something, Dark Side" as being a "pretty entertaining parody, and a safe way to wrap things up." Tom Eames of entertainment website Digital Spy placed the episode at number six on his listing of the best Family Guy episodes in order of "yukyukyuks" and described the episode as "almost as good as the first [Star Wars parody], but much better than the third [Star Wars parody]." He added that the episode is "a bit bizarre on paper, but it works", and noted that you need to be a fan of the Star Wars franchise to understand the jokes.

== Home media ==
On December 22, 2009, before the episode first aired, it was released on DVD in Region 1, and — in a first for the series — the episode was available on Blu-ray Disc. It was released on December 26, 2009 in Region 2, and on December 23, 2009 in Region 4. As with "Blue Harvest", a limited-edition version is available in the region 2 version, and comes with collectible items, including a T-shirt of The Giant Chicken as Boba Fett. The Blu-ray Disc release features a second disc containing a "digital copy" of the episode.

Something, Something, Something, Dark Side
Set details
Special features
- Full, uncensored episode
- 2-disc set (Blu-ray Disc only)
- 1.33:1 aspect ratio
- Languages:
  - English (Dolby Digital 5.1, with subtitles)
  - Spanish (Dolby Digital, with subtitles)
  - French (Dolby Digital)
- Audio commentary by Seth MacFarlane with Mark Hentemann, David A. Goodman, Kirker Butler, Dominic Polcino and Seth Green
- Family Guy Fact-Ups
- The Dark Side of Poster Art
- An animatic version of the episode
- Family Guy: Something, Something, Something, Dark Side Table Read
- Family Guy — Episode VI: "We Have a Bad Feeling About This" Table Read (sneak peek)
Release dates
Region 1
Region 2
Region 4
December 22, 2009
December 26, 2009
December 23, 2009

== Sequel ==
With the success of "Blue Harvest" and "Something, Something, Something, Dark Side", a sequel episode, entitled "It's a Trap!" and parodying the film Return of the Jedi, aired during the ninth season of Family Guy. The episode was written by David A. Goodman and Cherry Chevapravatdumrong, and directed by Peter Shin, in his first episode since the fourth season.
