= Brian Griffin's House of Payne =

- Family Guy episode
- Episode no.: Season 8 Episode 15
- Directed by: Jerry Langford
- Written by: A. Spencer Porter
- Production code: 7ACX13
- Original air date: March 28, 2010

Guest appearances
- Jennifer Birmingham; Rob Lotterstein as himself; Danielle Panabaker as Woods' daughter; Charlie Sheen as himself; Elijah Wood as himself; James Woods as himself

Episode chronology
← Previous "Peter-assment"	Next → "April in Quahog"
- Family Guy season 8

"Brian Griffin's House of Payne" is the 15th episode of the eighth season of the animated comedy series Family Guy. It originally aired on Fox in the United States on March 28, 2010. The episode features Brian as he discovers an old script he had written that Stewie found in the basement, and subsequently pitches the show to television executives. The show is quickly and dramatically altered by the executives and James Woods, however, much to Brian's frustration, who nevertheless attempts to adapt to the new format. Meanwhile, Chris and Meg attempt to hide the fact that Stewie is unconscious, and has a severe head injury after they accidentally bump him down a flight of stairs in the house.

The episode was written by Spencer Porter and directed by Jerry Langford. It received mixed reviews from critics for its storyline and many cultural references. According to Nielsen ratings, it was viewed in 7.27 million homes in its original airing. The episode featured guest performances by Jennifer Birmingham, Rob Lotterstein, Danielle Panabaker, Charlie Sheen, Elijah Wood and James Woods, along with several recurring guest voice actors for the series. "Brian Griffin's House of Payne" was released on DVD along with ten other episodes from the season on December 13, 2011.

== Plot ==
Stewie rams a toy spaceship into Peter's ear, annoying him, so Peter throws Rupert into the basement. Stewie follows the bear, discovering an old television script that Brian wrote entitled What I Learned on Jefferson Street. Stewie tosses the script onto the kitchen table, prompting Lois to question what it is about. Brian suggests she read it and tell him what she thinks. Lois falls in love with it, and suggests he meet with network executives about producing the show. When Brian pitches it to CBS, the executives respond positively. While the initial casting session goes well, with Elijah Wood auditioning for the lead, the producers assigned by the executives also bring in James Woods, who performs the role in a more comedic fashion, winning over the executives. Brian's serious drama is turned into a sitcom, bringing in a live studio audience as well as a chimpanzee, and renaming it Class Holes. When Brian objects to the changes, the producers remind him of what he had tried to achieve for many years—his own television show—and threaten to fire him if he objects to the changes. Disappointed that Brian allowed the executives to change his show so drastically, Lois demands that he stand up for himself and object to everything James Woods changed about the show. The producers, however, do not take kindly to Brian's desire to start over, so Brian quits in frustration. He is disappointed that he no longer has his own television show, but Lois convinces him that it is his integrity that matters. Peter interrupts, with his own show appearing on the screen, entitled Bigger Jaws.

Meanwhile, Chris sneaks into Meg's bedroom and reads her diary. Discovering him, Meg chases after Chris while Stewie walks by the staircase. Accidentally bumped by them, Stewie tumbles down the stairs and loses consciousness after suffering a severe head wound. Chris and Meg hide the wound with a hat, but Peter figures out the charade, reveals that he has knocked both of them out plenty of times, and wishes to continue hiding Stewie's injury from Lois. However, when a raccoon bites into Stewie's head, the injuries get worse and Meg insists on taking Stewie to the hospital. Peter agrees and upon seeing Lois pulling out of the driveway, throws Stewie behind her car, making it appear as if Lois ran him over to induce her guilt. Lois suggests they frame someone else, but Peter professes his love for her and suggests they take Stewie to the hospital. Stewie later walks in on the family with his head wrapped in bandages, revealing that several months have passed since his accident.

== Production and development ==
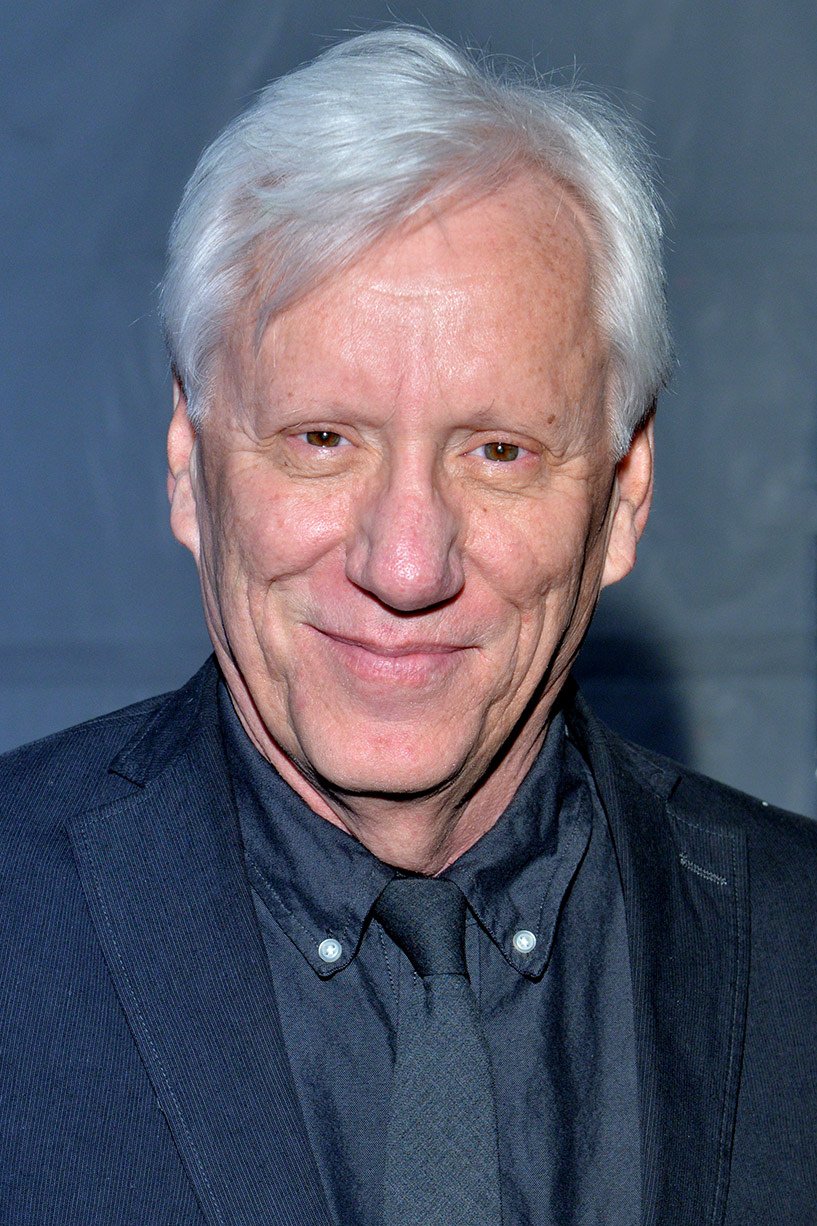
Woods made his third official appearance.

In his first official episode for the series, the show was written by Spencer Porter, who had previously worked as a writing assistant for series creator and executive producer Seth MacFarlane on both Family Guy, as well as The Cleveland Show and American Dad!. In addition, the episode was directed by series regular Jerry Langford, his second episode for the season, the first being "Quagmire's Baby". Series regulars Peter Shin and James Purdum served as supervising directors, with Andrew Goldberg and Alex Carter serving as staff writers for the episode. Composer Ron Jones, who has worked on the series since its inception, returned to compose the music for "Brian Griffin's House of Payne". The opening scene of the episode, involving Stewie in the Star Wars-like universe, was originally attempted to be animated by the traditional Korean animators, which regularly provide the animation for Family Guy. According to Shannon Smith, producer for Family Guy, half-way through production of the sequence, they instead decided to approach Atmosphere Visual Effects, a Vancouver-based animation company who had previously worked on shows like Battlestar Galactica and Stargate. The sequence was created during the 2010 Winter Olympics, which took place in Vancouver, during which the company was on hiatus from their regularly scheduled work.

"Brian Griffin's House of Payne", along with the eleven other episodes from Family Guy's eighth season, was released on a three-disc DVD set in the United States on December 13, 2011. The sets include brief audio commentaries by various crew and cast members for several episodes, a collection of deleted scenes and animatics, a special mini-feature which discussed the process behind animating "And Then There Were Fewer", a mini-feature entitled "The Comical Adventures of Family Guy – Brian & Stewie: The Lost Phone Call", and footage of the Family Guy panel at the 2010 San Diego Comic-Con.

Returning for his third official appearance in the series, the first being "Peter's Got Woods", the second being "Back to the Woods" and the fourth being a brief cameo appearance in The Empire Strikes Back parody entitled "Something, Something, Something, Dark Side", actor James Woods reassumed his role as the overly exaggerated version of himself. Actress Danielle Panabaker, who played Woods' character's daughter in the TV series Shark, voiced Woods' fictional daughter. In addition, voice actress Jennifer Birmingham, writer Rob Lotterstein, and actors Charlie Sheen and Elijah Wood guest star as themselves. Recurring guest voice actor Ralph Garman and writers Mark Hentemann, Chris Sheridan, Danny Smith, Alec Sulkin and John Viener also made minor appearances. Actress Jennifer Tilly and Actor Patrick Warburton guest appeared as well. "Brian Griffin's House of Payne" was Elijah Wood's first episode of Family Guy, however he previously provided a voice for Seth MacFarlane's second show American Dad!, in the Season 3 episode "Iced, Iced, Babies".

== Cultural references ==
In the opening scene of the episode, a Battlestar Galactica and Star Wars-inspired space fight is shown between Stewie, Rupert, and a giant spaceship in the shape of Peter's head, along with a series of lookalike TIE fighters. In addition, Stewie paraphrases a series of lyrics from the 1972 single "Rocket Man" by singer-songwriter and composer Elton John. When Brian's script is brought up during breakfast, Peter mentions his own idea for a script entitled Bigger Jaws, in which the shark from the 1975 film Jaws has to team up with the guys, including Martin Brody, Quint and Matt Hooper, to go after him to get "bigger Jaws." After it is produced, Peter already has a sequel in mind called Way Bigger Jaws. A historical cutaway gag portrays Adolf Hitler thinking he is being rejected by the publishing house for his submission of the autobiographical Mein Kampf, in which a publisher tells him, "We didn't like it... we loved it!" – to which Hitler replies, "I could have killed you, Mr. Weinberg!" Most of the storyline following Stewie, Chris and Meg is an homage to the 1989 film Weekend at Bernie's. The episode's title is also a reference to the TBS series Tyler Perry's House of Payne. As the family gathers around the television to watch Brian's show, actors Charlie Sheen, Jon Cryer and Angus T. Jones of the CBS sitcom Two and a Half Men appear in the Griffin family living room, with Sheen attacking Brian for always criticizing their show.

== Reception ==
In an improvement over the previous four episodes, the episode was viewed in 7.27 million homes in its original airing, according to Nielsen ratings, despite airing simultaneously with The Amazing Race on CBS and Celebrity Apprentice on NBC. The episode also acquired a 3.7 rating in the 18–49 demographic, beating The Simpsons, The Cleveland Show, and Sons of Tucson, in addition to significantly edging out all three shows in total viewership.

Reviews of the episode were mixed. Emily VanDerWerff of The A.V. Club called Brian's plotline a "pretty funny, if uninspired, take on the pilot process." VanDerWerff also criticized the Stewie storyline, calling it an unnecessary "grossout gag." In a more positive review, Jason Hughes of TV Squad noted that "both storylines were funny to their respective ends," in addition to praising James Woods' performance in the episode. Ramsey Isler of IGN criticized Brian's plotline, writing that it "really didn't work as comedy" and "if the episode had been entirely about Stewie's predicament, it might have been much better".
