= C. W. Jensen =

American police officer

- Born: Charles W. Jensen; Portland, Oregon, U.S.
- Police career
- Department: Portland Police Bureau
- Service years: 1978–2006
- Rank: Captain
- Other work: Commentary of World's Wildest Police Videos

Charles W. Jensen is a retired captain of the Portland Police Bureau in the U.S. state of Oregon. Jensen was also a regular on the Fox television series World's Wildest Police Videos. He also appeared on other police-related programs, including American Detective and World's Scariest Police Chases, which first aired in 1991 and 1997 respectively.

== Police career ==
Jensen spent over 20 years with the Portland Police Bureau, and retired as a captain after a career that included assignments in homicide, hostage negotiation, and undercover street crime operations. He was a patrol shift commander and also commanded Internal Affairs and the Training Division.

He has written several articles about his experience when he shot and killed an armed robbery suspect who was holding a hostage. In November 1989, Jensen and Sgt. David Trimble of the Clark County, Washington Sheriff's Office interviewed Westley Allan Dodd, who confessed to sexually assaulting and murdering three young boys.

Jensen first met Paul Stojanovich, the producer of World's Scariest Police Chases, when he and his partner in the homicide squad appeared in the premiere episodes of ABC's American Detective in the early 1990s. He was the Portland Police spokesman from 1994 to 1996.

=== Disciplinary history ===
Jensen was investigated in 1999 for allegedly claiming improper reimbursement on some meals. However, the investigation was suspended when Jensen took medical leave from his police job, claiming trauma from a previous shooting and alcohol abuse meant that he was no longer fit for the job. Jensen then requested to continue with his old job in September 2003, which subsequently caused the investigation to resume. Jensen was then interviewed by David Corey to determine whether he was fit for duty. However, this interview contradicted many of Jensen's previous statements, leading Jensen to claim medical leave again. Then-Portland Mayor Vera Katz fired Jensen in March 2004 for engaging in a "pattern of deceptive behavior". After Jensen threatened Katz with a lawsuit, a monetary settlement was reached that reinstated him as a captain for retirement reasons.

== Post-retirement ==
After retiring from the Portland Police Bureau, Jensen became a television reporter at KGW-TV, the NBC affiliate in Portland. Jensen filled the role as police expert. Jensen is also the crime and police expert for KXL radio in Portland. Most recently Jensen has appeared in a series of television infomercials. He has appeared on Maury several times, and has become a frequent contributor on Nancy Grace. With the ongoing investigation of the Kyron Horman case in Portland, Oregon, Jensen has appeared on several national news programs as an expert commentator. Most recently he appeared on the 01/14/2016 episode of Investigation Discovery's Real Detective titled "Malice", which chronicled the Dodd investigation and arrest.

Jensen has one daughter, Anna.

== See also ==
- John Bunnell
