= Paul Stojanovich =

American television producer (1956–2003)

Paul Stojanovich Sr.
- Born: Paul John Stojanovich; February 13, 1956; Sacramento, California, U.S.
- Died: March 15, 2003 (aged 47) near Manzanita, Oregon, U.S.
- Education: Camden High School (San Jose, California) (dropped out)
- Occupation: Television producer
- Years active: 1986–2003
- Height: 6ft 0in (1.84 m)
- Spouse: Suzanne Keister (m. 1982; div. 1993)
- Partner: Kim Crowell (1995–2003; was engaged at the time of his death)
- Children: Paul Jr, Chester
- Parent(s): Chester and Martha Stojanovich

Paul John Stojanovich (February 13, 1956 – March 15, 2003) was an American television producer who created reality television police shows. His notable creations include Cops (1989–2009), American Detective (1991–1993) and World's Wildest Police Videos (1998–2001).

== Career ==
Stojanovich's father, Chester Stojanovich, was an entomologist with a doctorate from Stanford and his mother, Martha Stojanovich, was one of the first women to work at the Centers for Disease Control. Martha was diagnosed with schizophrenia shortly after he was born.

As a teenager, Stojanovich became an avid photographer, saving his money to buy an expensive Hasselblad camera and getting his own darkroom in his father's barn in Campbell, California. At the age of 13 he won the respect of and began collaborating with photographer Graham Nash. At 16, he dropped out of high school and started taking film-making classes.

His interest in policing began while attending high school in San Jose, often listening to his police scanner and subscribing to a CHP magazine. In 1973, at 17, Stojanovich met San Jose Police Officer Nate Jaeger who allowed him to ride along with him on patrol. Stojanovich filmed Jaeger's assignments on Super 8 film. That same year, Stojanovich produced his first 16mm short film: Two Bits featuring Jaeger. Stojanovich later filmed Jaeger's friends at the Santa Clara County Sheriff's Office Narcotics unit; the film became the Emmy award–winning documentary Narco.

Stojanovich then spent a few years working as a cameraman for then NBC affiliate KRON. At KRON, he met one of his heroes, photographer Ansel Adams, who was particularly interested in the workings of his video camera. He also worked as a field producer for the ABC News magazine 20/20 and was creative consultant on Oliver Stone's film Natural Born Killers.

After serving as a field producer for the reality show COPS in 1989 and then producing and creating the ABC series American Detective, Stojanovich served as executive producer on a series of crime reality shows, including World's Scariest Police Chases and Ultimate Police Challenge.

The Beaverton, Oregon Police Department made Stojanovich an Honorary Special Reserve Officer.

== Death ==
Stojanovich died on March 15, 2003, after accidentally falling off a cliff on the Oregon coast while posing for a photograph for his fiancée, Kim Crowell. He slipped on a wet tree root and fell 300 feet (91 m) to the rocks and ocean below.

== Filmography ==
Television
Year	Title	Role	Notes
1978	20/20	Field Producer	
1988	American Expose: Who Murdered JFK?	associate producer	TV film
1989–2009	Cops (TV series)	producer	5 episodes released posthumously
1991–1993	American Detective	Creator and Executive Producer	
1997–1998	World's Scariest Police Chases	Creator and Executive Producer	4 episodes
1997–1998	World's Scariest Police Shootouts	Creator and Executive Producer	2 episodes
1998–2001, 2012	World's Wildest Police Videos	Creator and Executive Producer	6 episodes
2000	Adrenaline Run	Executive Producer	TV Movie
2001	Surviving the Moment of Impact 4	Executive Producer	TV film Documentary
2001	Emergency Videos	Executive Producer	TV film

== See also ==
- John Bunnell
- C. W. Jensen
