= 1996 Honolulu hostage crisis =

Hostage crisis in Honolulu, Hawaii in 1996

- Shooter John Miranda with a shotgun taped to his hand pointed at Tom McNeil
- Location: Sand Island, Honolulu, Hawaii, U.S.
- Date: February 6, 1996; 30 years ago c. 7:00 a.m. – c. 2:30 p.m. (UTC-10)
- Target: Former co-workers
- Attack type: Hostage situation, shooting
- Weapon: Sawed-off shotgun
- Deaths: 1 (the perpetrator)
- Injuries: 2
- Perpetrator: John Miranda

On February 6, 1996, in Sand Island, Honolulu, Hawaii, 28-year-old John Miranda took hostages at the Seal Masters of Hawaii building, his former place of employment. During the hostage crisis, two hostages were injured, one seriously. Miranda was the only fatality during the crisis itself. However, a few weeks after the event, he was found to have murdered his former girlfriend prior to the crisis.

== Event ==
=== Start of the crisis ===
The incident began just before 7:00 a.m. on February 6, 1996, when 28-year-old John Nahale Miranda burst into the Seal Masters of Hawaii building. The company was a waterproofing business that was based in Sand Island, Honolulu. Miranda had previously worked at the building as an employee but had been fired eight months prior to the crisis. Miranda was enraged over having no money or job; he had also accused company officials of racism and firing him solely because he was Hawaiian/Puerto Rican. Miranda had armed himself with a sawed-off shotgun and a knife. As he made entry, Miranda demanded twenty-thousand dollars in cash from the company. The company owner, Harry Lee, prepared to accept the deal, but Lee's wife insisted on calling the police instead. As the call was made, Miranda took five employees who were working in the building hostage. One of them was his former supervisor and vice president of the company, 59-year-old Guy George. George had been the one to personally fire Miranda at the time of his dismissal. Miranda then opened fire with his sawed-off shotgun and shot George once in the leg. George suffered a serious gunshot wound to his right leg, and nearly half of it was blown off.

=== Law enforcement and media response ===
Miranda called local radio station I-94 and explained to them what he was doing. The presenters of the radio tried to talk him down and implored him to surrender peacefully, but Miranda refused as he had already been to jail previously and had no intention of returning. Law enforcement responded quickly after Miranda's initial break in and cordoned off the area. SWAT teams were called in and sharpshooters got into position around the building. Local news television crews also arrived on scene moments later and began broadcasting the event live.

=== Negotiation ===
During the early stages of the negotiations, Miranda dragged George to an open window and showed police he had already shot a hostage. Miranda threatened authorities and told them he had no intention of surrendering peacefully. At some point during the crisis, Miranda turned his attention elsewhere and George climbed out of the same open window and fell ten feet to the ground below. He then crawled across the ground and dragged himself away to safety. This enraged Miranda who then grabbed hold of another hostage, 30-year-old Tom McNeil. Miranda taped his sawed-off shotgun with duct tape to the back of McNeil's head and taped his own hand to the trigger of the gun. Miranda then exited the building with his four remaining hostages and ordered them to walk down the steps to the street below. He let three of them go and returned to the top of the steps with McNeil, who was now his only hostage. Miranda remained outside with McNeil for hours and the standoff continued at the top of the steps. Police pleaded Miranda to surrender peacefully, but he refused to cooperate. After hours passed, Miranda finally ordered McNeil to head down with him to the street.

=== Suspect shot ===
At around 2:30 p.m., Miranda stood with McNeil in the street surrounded by police officers from all sides. He then ordered McNeil to count down from sixty-seconds to zero. Once McNeil reached zero Miranda declared he would execute him. McNeil refused to comply, so Miranda began counting down for him instead. McNeil believed that once Miranda got to ten seconds it would be the end for him. As soon as Miranda reached thirteen, McNeil spun around and tried to break free. Miranda fired a shot, but missed, and police were then forced into action. Miranda was shot in the chest by police and McNeil broke free. Miranda was taken to The Queen's Medical Center hospital, but died of his gunshot wounds and was pronounced dead at 2:55 p.m. George had also been taken to the same hospital earlier in the day, recovering from the gunshot wound to his right leg.

== Aftermath ==
=== Casualties ===
Three of the hostages escaped unharmed, and McNeil himself only suffered a few minor injuries and scrapes during his struggle with Miranda. McNeil had been able to walk to a nearby ambulance and was treated at St. Francis Medical Center for cuts and bruises, but no gunshot wounds. George suffered the most serious injuries with a gunshot wound to the leg, but he also survived after being taken to Queen's Hospital. Miranda initially survived after being shot by police, but died later in the day from his wound. Miranda was the only fatality during the entire crisis.

=== Sherry Lynn Holmes ===
32-year-old Sherry Lynn Holmes was thought to be Miranda's current girlfriend at the time of the crisis. Holmes had reportedly been missing since January 31, 1996. According to police, during the standoff, Miranda had hinted that he had killed Holmes. Acting on an informant's tip, police searched Kawai Nui Marsh for the body of Holmes. Honolulu police and a team of dogs scoured the area several times before finding a cardboard box, buried only a few yards off of Kapa’a Quarry Road. The box was pulled from a shallow grave on March 29, 1996. Inside the box was a highly decomposed body, which was too decomposed to be positively identified at the time. Police were nearly certain that it was the body of Holmes. As no dental records existed for Holmes, investigators enlisted the aid of the Army's identification lab in Honolulu, using DNA and photo imaging technology to be certain. They confirmed the body was that of Holmes, and that she had been murdered by Miranda prior to the hostage crisis.

== In popular culture ==
In a special edition of World's Wildest Police Videos, known as World's Scariest Police Shootouts, footage of the event was shown in the finale of an episode; McNeil also described his experience on the day of the crisis in an interview.

In April 2017, McNeil did an interview with Edmonton Journal, describing how his life had been after the crisis. He revealed that he got married only six days after it. McNeil also did an interview in February 2018 with KHON-TV, in which he revealed that he moved to Canada in 2010, where he still resides. McNeil talked about the crisis and said the ordeal changed his view on life, making him appreciate everything he has.

== See also ==
- 1991 Sacramento hostage crisis
- 1993 Aurora, Colorado shooting
- 1999 Honolulu shootings
