= Noah Gray-Cabey =

American actor and pianist (born 1995)

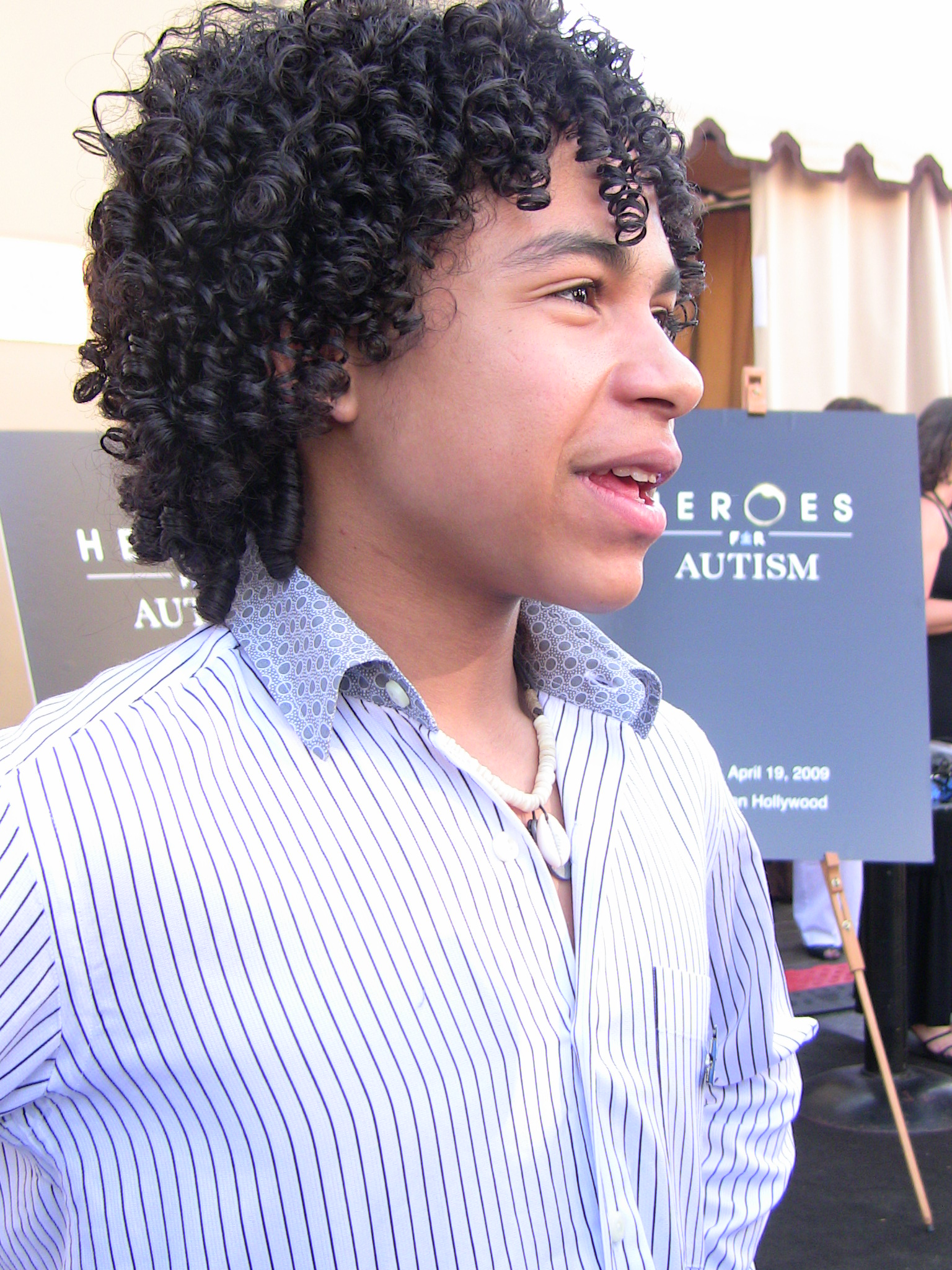
- Gray-Cabey in 2009
- Born: November 16, 1995 (age 30); Chicago, Illinois, U.S.
- Education: Paraclete High School (Lancaster, California); Harvard University
- Occupations: Actor, pianist
- Years active: 2001–present

Noah Gray-Cabey (born November 16, 1995) is an American actor and pianist. He is known for his roles in the television series My Wife and Kids and Heroes. He has appeared on the television shows Ripley's Believe It or Not, 48 Hours, The Tonight Show, Good Morning America and The Oprah Winfrey Show. Gray-Cabey also starred in the CBS medical drama Code Black as Dr. Eliot Dixon.

== Career ==
=== Acting ===
In 2001, Gray-Cabey began his acting career as a child actor, making his first appearance on television, he had a recurring role in ABC's sitcom series My Wife and Kids portraying Franklin Mumford, he won for Best Performance in a TV Series - Young Actor Age Ten or Younger award in 27th Young Artist Awards. He also made his feature film debut as Joey Dury in Lady in the Water. He also acted in roles in television series including Grey's Anatomy, CSI: Miami, CSI: Crime Scene Investigation and Ghost Whisperer. Gray-Cabey joined a cast in the role of Micah Sanders in the superhero drama series Heroes, he won for Best Performance in a TV Series - Young Actor Age Ten or Younger award in 28th Young Artist Awards and also won for Future Classic Award in 2007 TV Land Awards.

In 2011, Gray-Cabey appeared in a supporting role in the superhero comedy film Pizza Man, in which he played the role of Noah Sanders. Gray-Cabey reprised his recurring role in the superhero miniseries Heroes Reborn. Gray-Cabey had been rumored to be chosen to portray Cloak in the Marvel Television Universe/Marvel Cinematic Universe television adaptation of Cloak and Dagger. The role went to Aubrey Joseph.

Gray-Cabey was cast in the role of Elliot Dixon, a first-year resident in the ER, in the CBS' medical drama series Code Black. He bagged a recurring role in the crime thriller mystery drama series Pretty Little Liars: The Perfectionists, portraying the character Mason. He played the role of Frausto, a teammate of Spencer's from Crenshaw, in the sports drama series All American, premiered on The CW.

Gray-Cabey took on a supporting role in the horror thriller film Fog City.

=== Musician ===
At age four, Gray-Cabey performed in several venues throughout New England and Washington. He journeyed to Jamaica for his first tour with the New England Symphonic Ensemble. In July 2001, Gray-Cabey continued on to Australia, and at age five, became the youngest soloist ever to perform with an orchestra at the Sydney Opera House, as well as the Queensland Conservatory and the International Convention in Brisbane.

Gray-Cabey has recorded a CD together with his family. They perform pieces by J. S. Bach, Haydn and Vivaldi, among others. The CD also contains recordings of him playing when he was four years old.

Gray-Cabey's parents started Action in Music (A.I.M.), a project intended to help children develop their musical talents and give them opportunities to perform in other countries. The money raised from the concerts are donated to hospitals and orphanages in those countries.

== Filmography ==
Year	Title	Role	Notes
2001	48 Hours	Himself	
2001	Ripley's Believe It or Not!	Himself	
2002–2005	My Wife and Kids	Franklin Mumford	Recurring role (season 3); main role (seasons 4–5): 58 episodes
2004	CSI: Miami	Stevie Valdez	Episode: "Pro Per"
2006	Grey's Anatomy	Shawn Beglight	Episode: "What Have I Done to Deserve This?"
2006	Ghost Whisperer	Jameel Fisher	Episode: "Fury"
2006	Lady in the Water	Joey Dury	Film
2006–2009	Heroes	Micah Sanders	Main role (seasons 1–2); recurring role (season 3): 29 episodes
2009	Limelight	Romeo	Television film
2009	Family Guy	N/A	Voice role; episode: "Quagmire's Baby"
2010	CSI: Crime Scene Investigation	Steve Reppling	Episode: "Neverland"
2011	Pizza Man	Noah Sanders	Film
2015–2016	Heroes Reborn	Micah Sanders	Recurring role, 4 episodes
2016–2018	Code Black	Dr. Elliot Dixon	Recurring role (season 2); main role (season 3)
2019	Pretty Little Liars: The Perfectionists	Mason	Recurring role, 9 episodes
2021–2023	All American	Frausto	Recurring role (seasons 3–4); guest (season 5): 14 episodes
2023	Fog City	Robbie	

== Awards and nominations ==
Year	Award	Category	Work	Result	Ref.
2004	Young Artist Award	Best Performance in a TV Series (Comedy or Drama) - Young Actor Age Ten or Younger	My Wife and Kids	Nominated	
2005	Young Artist Award	Best Performance in a TV Series (Comedy or Drama) - Young Actor Age Ten or Younger	My Wife and Kids	Nominated	
2006	Young Artist Award	Best Performance in a TV Series (Comedy or Drama) - Young Actor Age Ten or Younger	My Wife and Kids	Won	
2007	Young Artist Award	Best Performance in a TV Series (Comedy or Drama) - Young Actor Age Ten or Younger	Heroes	Won	
2007	TV Land Awards	Future Classic Award	Heroes	Won	
2007	Young Artist Award	Best Performance in a Feature Film - Young Actor Age Ten or Younger	Lady in the Water	Nominated	
2008	Young Artist Award	Best Performance in a TV Series - Leading Young Actor	Heroes	Nominated	
