= John Bunnell =

Former Oregon sheriff and TV host

- Born: May 25, 1944 (age 82); Pendleton, Oregon, U.S.
- Other name: Sheriff John Bunnell
- Years active: 1989–present
- Police career
- Department: Multnomah County Sheriff's Office
- Service years: 1969–1995
- Status: Retired
- Rank: Sheriff
- Other work: Actor, host of World's Wildest Police Videos

John Edwin Bunnell (born May 25, 1944) is a former American sheriff of Multnomah County, Oregon. Bunnell is best known for presenting World's Wildest Police Videos between 1998 and 2001 and its revival briefly in 2012.

== Background ==
Bunnell was born in Pendleton, Oregon. He joined the Multnomah County Sheriff's Department in January 1969 and managed the drugs and vice unit in the 1980s. Between 1989 and 1990, Multnomah County Sheriff's Office was featured in 15 episodes of COPS, and 13 episodes of American Detective in 1991, which Bunnell also hosted. He was appointed Sheriff of Multnomah County when the previous sheriff, Robert G. Skipper, retired in 1994 before the end of his term. Bunnell took the oath of office on November 30, 1994, and served until May 1995. In the spring of 1995, Bunnell ran against Dan Noelle for Multnomah County Sheriff, losing the election to Noelle, who assumed office in June 1995.

== Filmography ==
Year	Title	Notes
1989–90	Cops	TV program
1991–93	American Detective	TV series
1998–2001; 2012	World's Wildest Police Videos	TV series; Main series: 5 seasons and 69 episodes Spin-off series: 25 episodes
2001	World's Scariest Police Chases	Video game
2001	Ghost World	Film
2003	Bad Santa	Film; as Police Chief
2008	ID Watchdog	Advertisement
2008	911 Cell Phone Bank	Public service announcement
2008	ID Watchdog - 360	Advertisement
2009	Family Guy	2 episodes: "Quagmire's Baby" and "Something, Something, Something, Dark Side" (both aired in 2009)
2010	Adult Swim Block Party	Advertisement
2016	Officer Involved	Documentary
2016	Strickland for Sheriff	Advertisement

== See also ==
- C. W. Jensen
