= List of Family Guy writers =

Head Writers

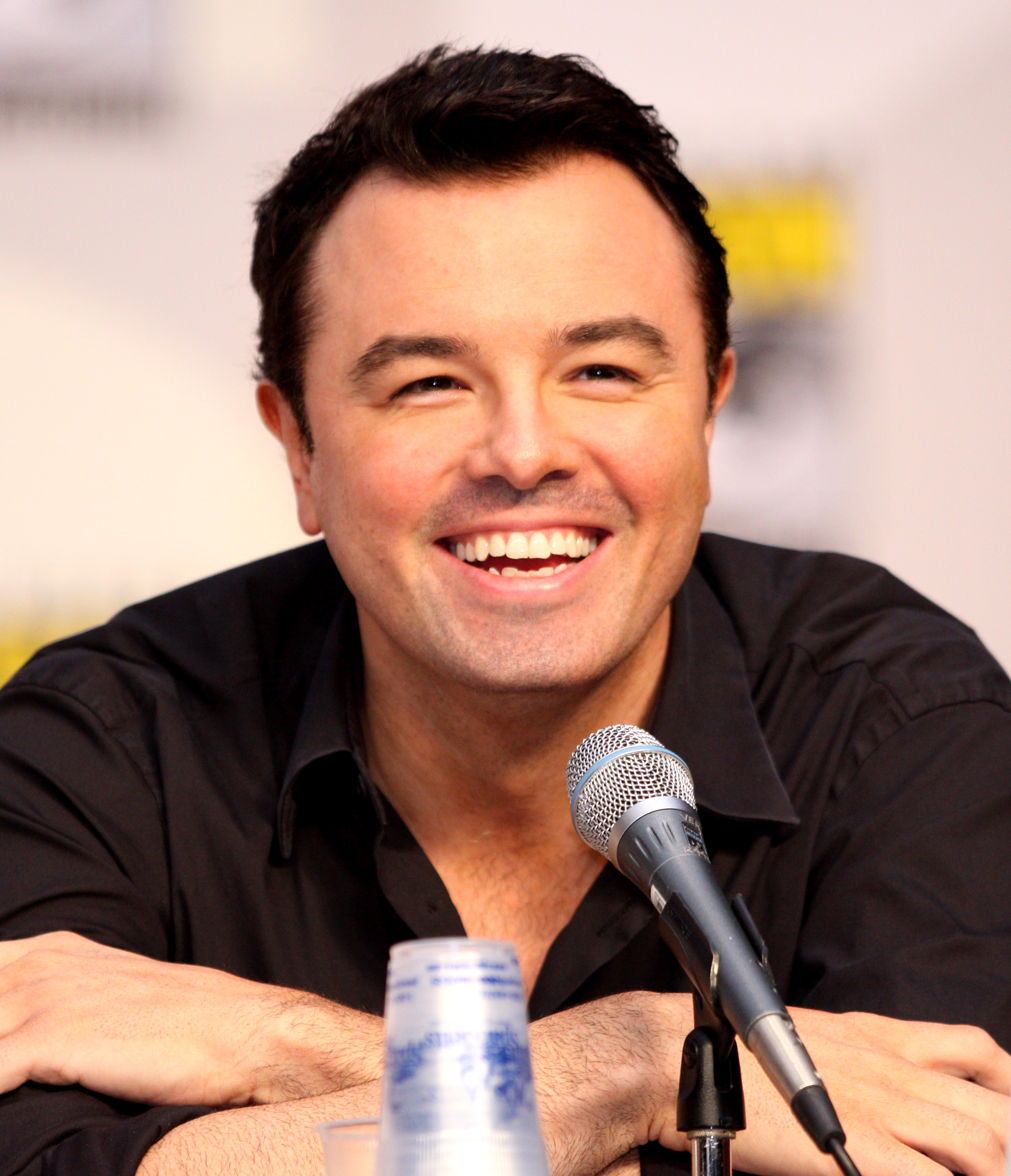
Seth MacFarlane

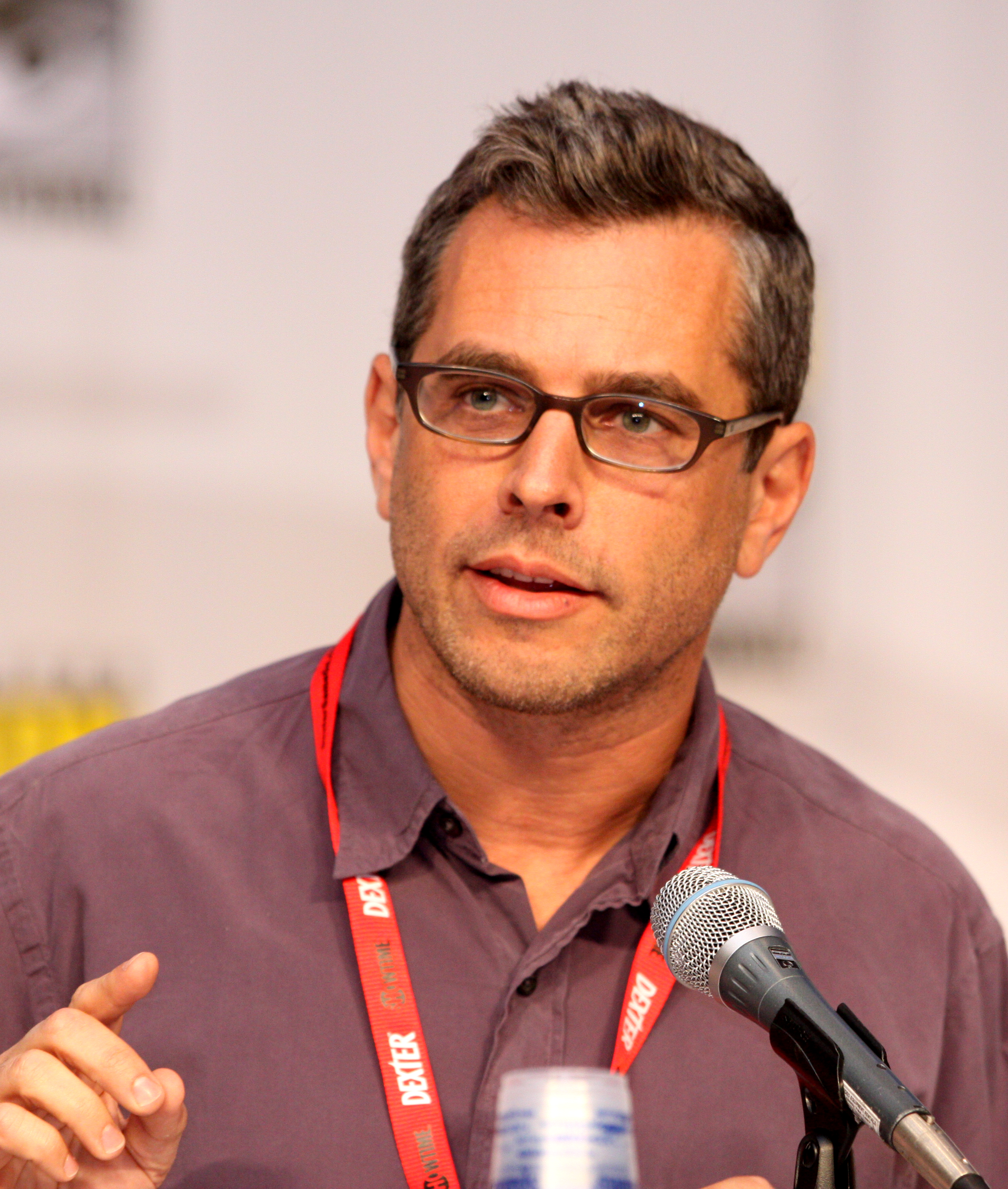
Richard Appel

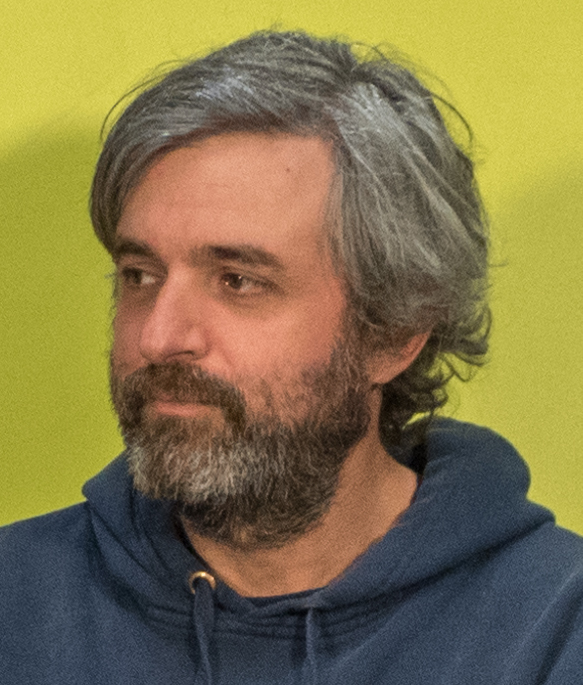
Alec Sulkin

The following is a list of writers who have worked on the Fox animated television series Family Guy in the order of first credited episode (by broadcast). As of 7 December 2014, 60 people have been credited with writing or co-writing at least one episode of Family Guy.

== List of writers ==
#	Writer	Number written	Duration	Seasons	Notes
1	Seth MacFarlane	3	1999, 2002, 2005	1, 3-4	One co-written with Gene Laufenberg, Michael Shipley and Jim Benstein
2	Chris Sheridan	14	1999-2001, 2005-2007, 2010, 2012-2014	1-4, 6, 8-12	One co-written with Gary Janetti and one with Danny Smith
3	Danny Smith	13	1999, 2001, 2005, 2007-2012, 2014	1-12	One co-written with Chris Sheridan
4	Neil Goldman & Garrett Donovan	4	1999-2000	1-2	
5	Mike Barker & Matt Weitzman	8	1999-2002	1-3	
6	Ricky Blitt	5	1999-2001, 2003	1-3	
7	Gary Janetti	11	1999-2001, 2006, 2010-2013	1-4, 8-11	One co-written with Chris Sheridan
8	Craig Hoffman	3	2000	2	
9	Steve Callaghan	18	2000-2001, 2005-2014	2-6, 8-12	One co-written with Tom Maxwell & Don Woodard
10	Dave Collard	3	2000-2001	2-3	All co-written with Ken Goin
11	Ken Goin	4	2000-2001, 2005	2-4	Three co-written with Dave Collard
12	Bobby Bowman	1	2000	2	
13	Jim Bernstein & Michael Shipley	2	2001-2002	3	One co-written with Gene Laufenberg and Seth MacFarlane
14	Mike Henry	6	2001, 2005-2008	3-5, 7	One co-written with Alex Borstein and one with Patrick Henry
15	Mark Hentemann	14	2001-2002, 2005-2012, 2014	3-5, 7-8, 10-11, 13	One based on a short story by Richard Matheson
16	Alex Borstein	4	2001, 2006-2007	3-5	One co-written with Mike Henry
17	Alex Barnow & Marc Firek	1	2001	3	
18	Allison Adler	1	2002	3	
19	Daniel Palladino	2	2002, 2013	3, 11	
20	Gene Laufenberg	2	2002, 2005	3-4	One co-written with Seth MacFarlane, Jim Bernstein and Michael Shipley
21	Patrick Henry	1	2005	4	Co-written with Mike Henry
22	Alec Sulkin	14	2005-2007, 2009, 2011-2012, 2014	4-12	Four co-written with Wellesley Wild and one with Tom Devanney and Deepak Sethi
23	Wellesley Wild	13	2005-2006, 2008-2013	4-12	Four co-written with Alec Sulkin
24	Patrick Meighan	14	2005-2014	4-5, 7-13	
25	Tom Devanney	11	2005-2012, 2014	4-6, 8-12	One co-written with Alec Sulkin and Deepak Sethi
26	John Viener	8	2005-2011, 2018	4, 6-9, 16	
27	Matt Fleckenstein	2	2005, 2009	4, 7	
28	Kirker Butler	5	2005-2007, 2010	4-6, 8	
29	Michael Rowe	1	2006	4	
30	Tom Maxwell & Don Woodard	1	2006	4	Co-written with Steve Callaghan
31	Cherry Chevapravatdumrong	13	2006-2007, 2009-2014	4-5, 7-13	One co-written with David A. Goodman
32	David A. Goodman	5	2006-2007, 2011-2012	4, 6, 9-10	One co-written with Cherry Chevapravatdumrong
33	Andrew Goldberg	11	2007, 2009-2011, 2013-2017	6-15	Two co-written with Alex Carter
34	Brian Scully	6	2008, 2010-2013	7-12	
35	Alex Carter	8	2008-2013	7-12	
36	Richard Appel	1	2009	7	
37	Spencer Porter	2	2010, 2012	8, 10	
38	Matt Harrigan & Dave Willis	1	2011	9	
39	Anthony Blasucci	4	2011-2013	9, 11-12	All co-written with Mike Desilets
40	Mike Desilets	5	2011-2014	9, 11-13	Four co-written with Anthony Blasucci
41	Artie Johann & Shawn Ries	3	2011, 2013-2014	10-12	
42	Dave Ihlenfeld & David Wright	3	2011-2012, 2014	10-12	
43	Julius Sharpe	4	2012-2014	10-12	
44	Deepak Sethi	1	2012	10	Co-written with Tom Devanney and Alec Sulkin
45	Ted Jessup	5	2013-2014	11-13	
46	Kristin Long	1	2013	11	
47	Teresa Hsiao	2	2013-2014	11-12	
48	Dominic Bianchi & Joe Vaux	1	2013	12	
49	Kevin Biggins & Travis Bowe	1	2014	12	
50	Steve Marmel	1	2014	13	
51	Billy Domineau	1	2018	17	

== See also ==
- Family Guy
- List of Family Guy voice actors
- List of The Simpsons writers
