= World's Scariest Police Chases (video game) =

2001 driving video game

- North American cover art
- Developer: Unique Development Studios
- Publishers: Activision; Fox Interactive
- Designer: Oskar Burman
- Composer: Christina Björklund
- Platform: PlayStation
- Release: NA: 7 June 2001; EU: 29 June 2001
- Genres: Action, driving
- Modes: Single-player, multiplayer

World's Scariest Police Chases is an open world action driving video game developed by Swedish company Unique Development Studios (sv) and co-published by Fox Interactive and Activision for the PlayStation in June 2001. Work on the Dreamcast, PlayStation 2 and PC versions of the game was cancelled, as well as its sequel, titled World's Scariest Police Chases 2: Code Red.

It is a video game adaptation of the eponymous television series that was later renamed to World's Wildest Police Videos. The player takes on the role of a police officer whose job is to fight crime by chasing criminals throughout the fictional city of Ashland and apprehending them. The game includes several different gameplay modes, with a two-player multiplayer mode also available.

== Gameplay ==
The game includes 20 missions in Single Mission mode (career mode). The player can initiate a pursuit of a criminal, search and capture suspects, start a race to a target, escort VIPs, make a police intervention, provide assistance. The game's action is narrated by John Bunnell. The game includes more than 50 kilometres of roads and highways with varying weather conditions and weather effects such as rain, fog, lightning, etc. The gameplay takes place at night or during the day. The player has a choice of 13 vehicles with different driving capabilities and different weapons, including handguns, assault rifles, shotguns, grenades or light anti-tank weapons, which can only be used while driving. The game allows the player to enter cheat codes that alter gameplay. The player is able to watch a replay, during which they can set the camera angles.

A minimap is displayed in the bottom left corner (the full map is available in the pause menu), which shows the current position of the player and the target vehicle. Next to the map on the right are indicators of the opponent. In the top left corner is the damage indicator for the player's vehicle, and in the top right corner is a frame with a weapon indicator.

=== Game modes ===
The game features two side game modes: Pursuit mode and Free Patrol.

Two players can participate in multiplayer mode, with one player driving the vehicle and the other operating the weapon.

== Development and release ==
In May 2000, the PC version of the game was unveiled at E3 2000, with one mission and a quest video provided in the version presented. On 14 August 2000, the first screenshots of the game were published.

Activision and Fox supported the release of the game financially. A raffle with prizes worth up to $50,000 was organised, running from 28 June to 31 December 2001.

On 1 December 2000, it was announced that the game would only be released for the PlayStation console, and versions for other platforms were cancelled. UDS utilised some elements from the PC version when developing the PlayStation version. On 4 December it was announced that the game would be released in April 2001.

Activision released it for the PlayStation console on 7 June 2001 in the U.S. and on 29 June of the same year in Europe. In Germany, the game was released by Activision Deutschland on 5 April 2002. The Dreamcast and PC versions were to be developed by Teeny Weeny Games and released by Fox Interactive, but were cancelled in 2001. The PlayStation 2 version of the game developed by Sierra Entertainment was also cancelled.

== Reception ==
Reception

Aggregate score
| Aggregator | Score |
|---|---|
| Metacritic | 54/100 |

Review scores
| Publication | Score |
|---|---|
| Edge | 7/10 |
| Electronic Gaming Monthly | 5.5/10 |
| EP Daily | 6/10 |
| Game Informer | 6.75/10 |
| GameRevolution | D |
| GameSpot | 3.6/10 |
| GameZone | 8/10 |
| IGN | 6/10 |
| Jeuxvideo.com | 12/20 |
| Next Generation | 4/5 |
| Official U.S. PlayStation Magazine | 2/5 |
| Maxim | 4/5 |

The game received "mixed" reviews according to the review aggregation website Metacritic. Daniel Erickson of NextGen, however, said, "Never has a television show been translated so perfectly into a videogame – exciting, over-the-top, and just a little on the silly side."
