= Peterhead Prison Riot =

1987 prison riot in Peterhead, Scotland

- Date: 28 September 1987 – 1 October 1987
- Location: Peterhead, Scotland
- Cause: Poor Living Conditions
- Motive: To gain better facilities
- Property damage: £55 million (equivalent to £132,989,789 in 2022)

The Peterhead Prison Riot was a prison riot that occurred on 28 September 1987 at HMP Peterhead, in Peterhead.

== Background ==
HMP Peterhead was a convict prison in Peterhead, Scotland. It operated from 1888 to 2013. It was closed in favour of the neighbouring super prison HMP & YOI Grampian. It had a capacity of 152, but at one point in 1911 it was home to 455 prisoners.

In preceding year there had been a number of riots and roof top protests by inmates in neighbouring prisons such as at Saughton in Edinburgh and Barlinnie in Glasgow.

Peterhead already had a reputation for disturbances with a riot the previous year, earning it the nickname among inmates as the "Hate Factory" or "Scottish Alcatraz".

The prison was overcrowded and without proper sanitation such as toilets within cells, forcing inmates to slop out their human waste every day.

Many of the prisoners were from the Central Belt and were angered in being placed in a prison in North-east Scotland so far away from their friends and family, who had to spend between 6 and 9 hours travelling for visits that were very short and even distressing.

The prisoners were largely city-dwelling Roman Catholics policed by mostly rural-based Protestants.

Discontent was widespread amongst prisoners, especially those with long-term sentences, with one in 1984 commenting of being "in limbo - the living dead."

== Aftermath ==
The Scottish Prison Service located all those who had been involved in riots and hostage-taking at Peterhead in an attempt to stabilise the entire prison estate. The 60 inmates involved were initially held in "lockdown" under prison rule 36 which meant the governor had to visit each one every day. The repairs cost £55 million (equivalent to £132,989,789 in 2022). The SAS were sent in to take control of the situation.

== Bibliography ==
- "Peterhead Prison Museum to display unseen riot photos to the public". 19 September 2020.
- "New exhibition tells '˜inside' story of prison riot". 27 September 2017.
- "The prison riot that ended with the SAS". BBC News. 27 September 2017.
- "Notorious tale of two prison wardens being held hostage on Peterhead Prison roof". 4 June 2022.
- "Photos from a prison riot, which needed the SAS to intervene with smoke bombs, are being made public for the first time". Business Insider.
- McKinlay, Paul (January 1986). Scottish Prisons: Lift The Lid (1st ed.). Edinburgh: Fight Racism! Fight Imperialism!.
- Editor (June 1987). "Repressing the living dead: Penal policy and the Peterhead demonstration". Critical Social Policy. 7 (19). Sage Publications: 68–72. doi:10.1177/026101838700701905.
