= Daryl Matthews =

American academic

Daryl Matthews is a medical doctor and a Professor of forensic Psychiatry at the University of Hawaii. Matthews has served as a Psychiatric consultant to the US Army. Matthews has been called in to give advice about the Guantanamo Bay detainment camps, in Cuba, where suspects in the global war on terror are held in extrajudicial detention.

== Views on the death penalty ==
The Guardian reports that, although he is personally opposed to the death penalty, Matthews has served as an expert witness in cases where the death penalty is a possible penalty, and his views may play a role in whether that sentences is imposed.

== Guantanamo views ==
CBS News cited an interview Matthews had done with the Associated Press where he commented about a June 2003 visit:

"There were many things I wanted to see that I was precluded from seeing, particularly with the interrogation issues, In no way did I get honest or accurate information. I feel like I was being systematically misled."

According to CBS Matthews it was "appalling" that camp doctors were sharing information from the detainee's medical records in order to aid interrogators to use the detainee's weaknesses against them. He also said that information from the detainee's medical files could give interrogators "tremendous power".

Al Jazeera attributed the following view to Matthews: "Daryl Matthews, a professor of forensic psychiatry at the University of Hawaii who examined the prisoners, stated that given the cultural differences between interrogators and prisoners, such a classification was difficult if not impossible."

In 2003 the British paper, The Guardian quoted Matthews about the composition of the detainee population at Guantanamo:

"They are an extremely heterogeneous group. There are some 40 different nationalities, there's 18 different languages, There's a big division between Arabic-speaking and Urdu-Pashto-speaking ones. There are some people who are extremely well educated and westernised, and some people who are not at all. There are some very young people and some very old and wise people. There are people who speak English well, people who don't speak English at all. There are some who go in with mental disorders there are some very secular, and some deeply devout."

Matthews pointed out that there are more secure prisons in the USA. Matthews pointed out the elements that Guantanamo detainees experienced in common with criminals in US prisons. However, Matthews also pointed out unique stressors Guantanamo detainees experienced that common criminals do not:

"But at Guantanamo there's an added level of stress, and I think that is the thing that's somewhat unique... Inmates in a normal prison are focused on how much time they are going to serve, on contacting their lawyers, on being able to take constructive efforts to get out; these are important ways prisoners deal with the stress of confinement, and these guys can't do anything."

== Views on Hamdan ==
According to The New Standard Matthews conducted clinical interviews with Salim Hamdan, one of the ten detainees who had faced charges before Guantanamo military commissions. The New Standard reports that Matthews's court declaration about Hamdan described him as "particularly susceptible to mental coercion and false confession", because of the conditions of his detention. He also concluded that the "conditions of his confinement place Hamdan at significant risk of future psychiatric deterioration."
