= American Detective =

- Created by: Paul Stojanovich
- Starring: John Bunnell
- Country of origin: United States

Production
- Running time: 30 min.
- Production companies: Paul Stojanovich Productions, Inc.; ABC Productions; Orion Television Entertainment

Original release
- Network: ABC
- Release: May 2, 1991 – 1993

American Detective is a police documentary television series that aired on ABC in the United States from 1991 to 1993. It was created by Paul Stojanovich and was a joint production of both Paul Stojanovich Productions and ABC Productions in association with Orion Television Entertainment.

American Detective features detectives in major U.S. urban areas working on high-profile criminal cases which were often drug-related. The program often allows glimpses into the personal lives of the detectives.

During the latter part of the program's run, Lieutenant John Bunnell of the Multnomah County, Oregon Sheriff's Department, who had been featured in a number of the program's earlier shows, served in the role of host, even taking the viewers on a trip to Russia to look at his counterparts there in February 1993.

American Detective was aired on ABC Television. It originally aired opposite NBC's Cheers and was later moved to Monday night, placed with Monday Night Football.
