= Quagmire's Baby =

- Family Guy episode
- Episode no.: Season 8 Episode 6
- Directed by: Jerry Langford
- Written by: Patrick Meighan
- Production code: 7ACX04
- Original air date: November 15, 2009

Guest appearances
- Luke Adams; John Bunnell as himself; Max Burkholder as Child; Noah Gray-Cabey; Christine Lakin as Receptionist; Brittany Snow as Candy; Mae Whitman as Anna-Lee Quagmire; Tom Wilson as First Step

Episode chronology
← Previous "Hannah Banana"	Next → "Jerome Is the New Black"
- Family Guy season 8

"Quagmire's Baby" is the sixth episode of the eighth season of the animated comedy series Family Guy. It originally aired on Fox in the United States on November 15, 2009.

The episode centers on neighbor Glenn Quagmire, who suddenly discovers that he is the father of a newborn baby girl after she is left at his doorstep. While he takes care of the baby, whom he names Anna Lee, Quagmire quickly becomes reluctant to give up his sex life, and must decide whether to keep her or give her up for adoption. Meanwhile, Griffin family baby Stewie decides to create a dumbed-down version of himself, in order to perform various tasks for him and serve as his assistant, and the intrigued family dog, Brian, also wants one.

The episode was written by series regular Patrick Meighan, and directed by Jerry Langford. It received positive reviews from critics for its storyline and many cultural references. According to Nielsen ratings, it was viewed in 8.28 million homes in its original airing. The episode featured guest performances by Luke Adams, John Bunnell, Max Burkholder, Noah Gray-Cabey, Christine Lakin, Brittany Snow, Mae Whitman, and Tom Wilson, along with several recurring guest voice actors for the series. "Quagmire's Baby" was released on DVD along with seven other episodes from the season on June 15, 2010.

== Plot ==
Peter buys an amateur radio at Quagmire's garage sale and finds out that he can use it to communicate with the spirit of Ronald Reagan. Peter becomes fond of his friendship with the spirit until he learns it is Rich Little impersonating Reagan. He goes to return the radio to Quagmire, noticing a baby in a basket by his door. The baby turns out to be Quagmire's illegitimate daughter. Quagmire takes her in and names her Anna Lee. However, she greatly affects his sex life. Quagmire decides to put Anna Lee up for adoption. However, Quagmire is unable to stop thinking about Anna Lee, so the group head to her adoptive house to regain her. Quagmire realizes that Anna Lee's new parents treat her better and decides to leave her with them.

Meanwhile, Stewie clones a less intelligent assistant and names the simpleton duplicate "Bitch Stewie". After Brian meets Bitch Stewie, he becomes interested in having a clone of his own. Stewie and Bitch Stewie comply by creating "Bitch Brian", who is even less intelligent than Stewie's clone and incapable of doing the simplest of chores, due to Stewie being too lazy to create him and having Bitch Stewie do it instead. The clones eventually disintegrate due to their instability, with Brian expressing the desire to lick up their remains.

== Production and development ==
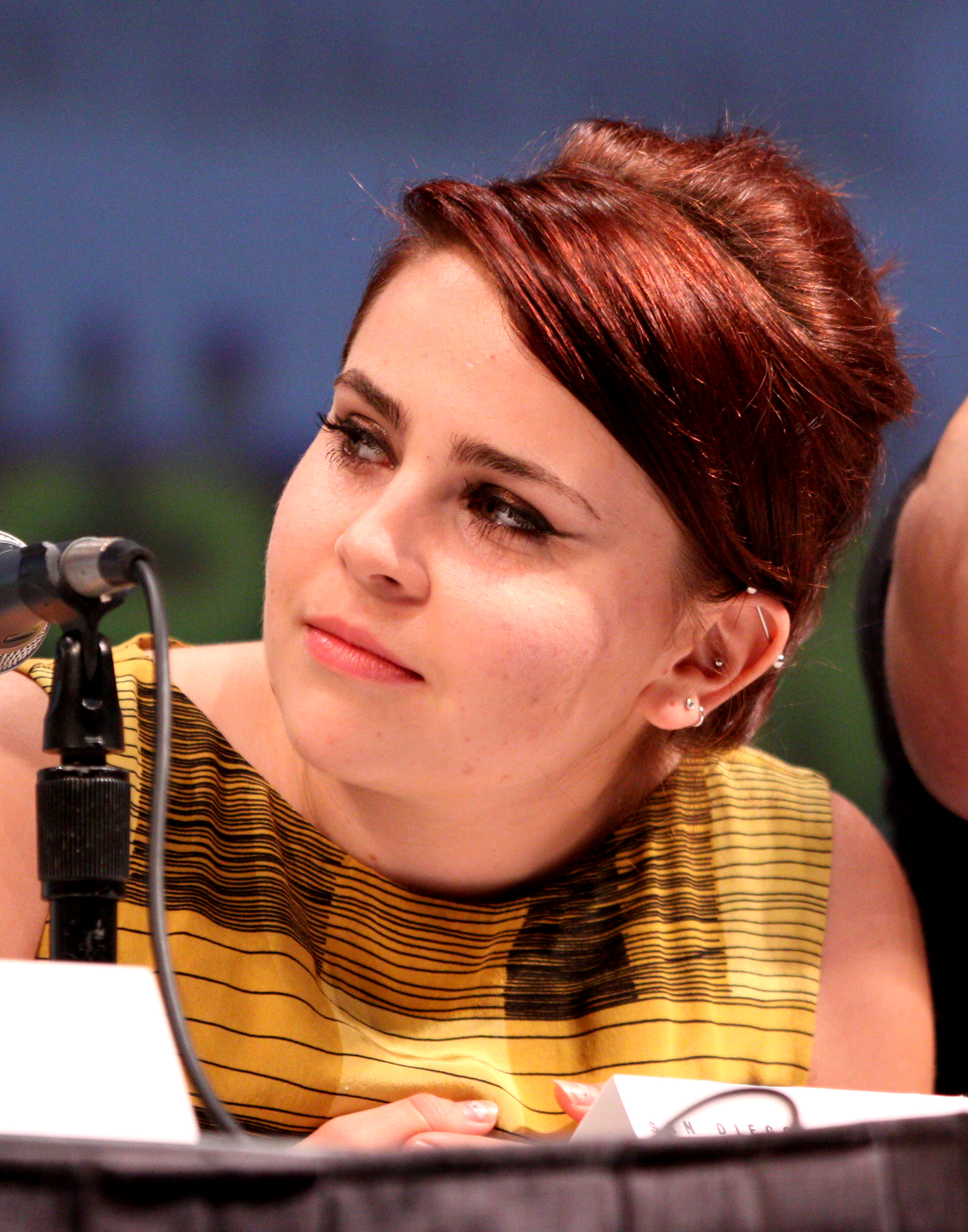
Mae Whitman guest starred in the episode as Anna Lee Quagmire.

The episode was written by series regular Patrick Meighan, in his first working episode of the season. It was directed by Jerry Langford, also in his first working credit of the season although he would direct "Brian Griffin's House of Payne".

"Quagmire's Baby", along with the seven other episodes from Family Guy's eighth season, were released on a three-disc DVD set in the United States on June 15, 2010. The sets included brief audio commentaries by Seth MacFarlane and various crew and cast members for several episodes,

In addition to the regular cast, actor Luke Adams, sheriff and television narrator John Bunnell, voice actor Max Burkholder, actor Noah Gray-Cabey, voice actress Christine Lakin, actress Brittany Snow, voice actress Mae Whitman and actor Tom Wilson guest starred in the episode. Recurring guest voice actors Danny Smith, writer Alec Sulkin and writer John Viener made minor appearances.

== Reception ==
"Quagmire's Baby" was broadcast on November 15, 2009, as a part of an animated television night on Fox, and was preceded by an episode of The Simpsons and MacFarlane's newest series The Cleveland Show. It was followed by MacFarlane's second show American Dad!. In a significant improvement over the previous week's two episodes, "Quagmire's Baby" was viewed in 8.28 million homes in its original airing, according to Nielsen ratings. The episode was the second most watched episode of the night, following The Simpsons episode "The Devil Wears Nada", despite airing simultaneously with Sunday Night Football on NBC, Desperate Housewives on ABC and Three Rivers on CBS. The episode also acquired a 4.1 rating in the 18–49 demographic, beating The Cleveland Show and American Dad!.

The episode received generally positive reviews from critics, citing "Quagmire's quirky storylines" and the pairing of Brian and Stewie as a good combination. Ahsan Haque of IGN noted that the episode possessed "some memorable jokes", and that "this episode manages to entertain from start to finish". Emily VanDerWerff of The A.V. Club reviewed the episode much more negatively, going on to state, "Tonight's episode started out promisingly", and found Bitch Brian to be "the sole saving grace of an episode that sort of meandered around after the first five or ten minutes".
