= The Line (Heroes) =

- Heroes episode
- Episode no.: Season 2 Episode 6
- Directed by: Jeannot Szwarc
- Written by: Adam Armus and Kay Foster
- Production code: 206
- Original air date: October 29, 2007

Guest appearances
- Jimmy Jean-Louis as the Haitian; Cary-Hiroyuki Tagawa as the Swordsmith; Nicholas D'Agosto as West Rosen; Eriko as Yaeko; Shalim Ortiz as Alejandro Herrera; Elya Baskin as Ivan Spector; Dianna Agron as Debbie Marshall; Janel Parrish as May; Katie Carr as Caitlin; Adair Tishler as Molly Walker; Stephen Tobolowsky as Bob Bishop; Kurando Mitsutake as White Beard

Episode chronology
← Previous "Fight or Flight"	Next → "Out of Time"
- Heroes season 2

"The Line" is the sixth episode of the second season of the NBC superhero drama series Heroes. It aired on October 29, 2007 in the USA.

== Plot ==
Peter decides that he must follow the painting and the ticket to Montreal, and Caitlin insists on going with him because she is with Peter in the painting and she also wants revenge for her brother Ricky's death.

Claire tries out for the cheerleading team, where she is off-handedly dismissed by Debbie, despite being the best candidate. West convinces Claire to humiliate Debbie so that she can use cheerleading as a cover for their relationship.

Debbie is drinking with the other cheerleaders as Claire comes and asks to speak with her in private. After Debbie's second refusal to let Claire join the squad, West appears in a ski mask and picks up Claire, dropping her and ostensibly killing her. Debbie runs as West gives chase.

The police come to Costa Verde High School, where a frantic Debbie tells them that a masked flying man chased her and killed Claire. Claire appears, having regenerated, and tells them that she doesn't know what Debbie is talking about. The police find Debbie's alcohol and arrest her. Claire and West sneak away to talk, and another cheerleader tells Claire that she is now in the squad since Debbie has been suspended from school for drinking on campus.

Mohinder is testing Monica's ability by way of gymnast tapes. Bob appears and tells Mohinder to give her an experimental variation of the virus, one which should disable her powers. Mohinder refuses, since the virus can mutate and become resistant or infect the general population.

Mohinder then calls Bennet, who advises him to do it in the interest of their plan to take down the Company and citing the fact that they have Molly.

Mohinder speaks with Monica again, but when confronted with the actual deed, Mohinder instead destroys the syringe. Bob tells him that someone else will do it if he will not, so Mohinder destroys the cabinet filled with their samples of the virus.

Bob later thanks Mohinder, telling them that they need him for his morality as well as his blood and knowledge, "to keep [them] in line." Bob tells Mohinder that he will be getting a partner to make sure "there are no further misunderstandings."

Mohinder is checking up on Molly as Niki reveals that she is now his new partner, and that she owes the Company a great deal. Bob also speaks with Monica, encouraging her to use her powers in a positive manner while she remains in New Orleans. He gives her an iPod with videos of various skills for her to learn.

Maya and Alejandro are traveling with Sylar to the border. Alejandro wants to leave Sylar and use a coyote to help them cross, believing him to be untrustworthy. Maya argues that they need Sylar and that he has been sent by God.

They cross the border where they are stopped by citizen border control. Sylar encourages Maya to use her power to get past, stopping Alejandro from negating her power.

The three drive away as the assailants fall. Alejandro later gives Maya an ultimatum: either Sylar goes or he does. She convinces Alejandro to allow Sylar to stay, but he tells her that the next time her power activates, he will let Sylar die.

When Maya isn't watching, Sylar tells Alejandro that he intends to kill them and steal their powers, or at least to use Maya, citing his original power as a means to control her. Alejandro, who doesn't speak English, can't understand his threats.

Bennet and the Haitian are in Odesa, Ukraine where they find Ivan, an old mentor of Noah and Claude. They threaten to take away memories of his family unless he tells them where to find the other paintings from the series of eight. Ivan refuses, and they begin by taking away his memories of the day he met his wife.

Ivan finally crumbles when threatened with the memories of his dead daughter. Ivan mentions that the paintings are "where we tagged the liquid man".

Noah then shoots him, to cover up the interrogation as a simple robbery. They find the paintings. Four of them depict Claire unconscious on the stairs, a hand holding a vial (similar to the injection), Niki beating on a door, and a shocked Peter standing in front of a window, a frowning man behind him in the lower-right corner, and a biohazard symbol overlaid on the lower-left corner. The final three, in order, depict Hiro and Kensei fighting, Mohinder with a broken nose and a smoking gun, and Noah's death.

Ando reads more of the scrolls as Hiro reveals that he, Kensei and Yaeko have attacked Whitebeard's camp. They rescue Yaeko's father, who tells them that Whitebeard has guns, which he plans to use to overthrow the emperor.

They are making their escape when Hiro teleports himself and Yaeko away to escape gunfire. She realizes that he was the one who saved her from the brigands and they kiss. Kensei sees this and betrays Hiro, siding with Whitebeard as they take Yaeko and her father away.

Peter and Caitlin arrive in Montreal to find a note from Adam Monroe. Moments later, Peter accidentally teleports them to New York City, where the streets are deserted and they see evacuation orders dated June 14, 2008 everywhere. The episode ends as they realize that they are a year in the future.

The episode was dedicated in memory of Timothy P. Susco who worked on the stage for Heroes and died suddenly on August 15, 2007.

== Critical reception ==
In the 18-49 demographic, "The Line" earned a 4.9/11 ratings share. This episode was watched by 10.51 million viewers.

Sean O'Neal of The A.V. Club gave the episode a B.

Robert Canning of IGN scored the episode 6.9 out of 10.
