= Heroes season 2 =

Heroes
- Season 2
- DVD cover
- Starring: Jack Coleman; Noah Gray-Cabey; Greg Grunberg; Ali Larter; Masi Oka; Hayden Panettiere; Adrian Pasdar; Sendhil Ramamurthy; Milo Ventimiglia; David Anders; Kristen Bell; Dana Davis; James Kyson Lee; Zachary Quinto; Dania Ramirez
- No. of episodes: 11

Release
- Original network: NBC
- Original release: September 24 – December 3, 2007

Season chronology
- ← Previous; Season 1 Next → Season 3

The NBC superhero drama television series Heroes follows the lives of people across the globe who possess various superhuman powers as they struggle to cope with their everyday lives and prevent foreseen disasters from occurring. The second season premiered on September 24, 2007, and was released on DVD and Blu-ray on August 26, 2008.

Within the seasons of Heroes are "volumes", which allow the writers to focus on shorter story arcs. The second season comprises a single volume of 11 episodes called Generations.

The second season was designed to contain three volumes called Generations, Exodus, and Villains. Exodus was scrapped due to in part to viewer criticism (some fans thought that the show had too slow of a build-up) but mainly due to the 2007–2008 Writers Guild of America strike; whilst Villains was carried over to the show's third season. As a result, the second season consisted of only 11 episodes, 13 fewer than were originally ordered by NBC. Originally, the second season of Heroes was to be followed in April and May 2008 by six stand-alone episodes of a new series, Heroes: Origins. The spin-off was intended as an alternative to a long mid-season hiatus, which led to a drop in ratings for Heroes in its first season. The project, which was later planned to be 12 episodes, was indefinitely postponed due to a decline in viewership and the strike and eventually cancelled.

== Plot ==
"Generations" begins four months after the events of Kirby Plaza. The main plot arc of Generations deals with the company and its research on the Shanti virus. This research is explored through the company's founders, whose identities are revealed, as well as through the effects of various strains of the virus. The heroes ultimately come together in an attempt to stop the release of a deadly strain of the virus and avert a global pandemic.

== Cast ==
=== Main characters ===
- Milo Ventimiglia as Peter Petrelli
- Jack Coleman as Noah Bennet
- Masi Oka as Hiro Nakamura
- Greg Grunberg as Matt Parkman
- Adrian Pasdar as Nathan Petrelli
- Hayden Panettiere as Claire Bennet
- Noah Gray-Cabey as Micah Sanders
- Ali Larter as Niki Sanders
- Sendhil Ramamurthy as Mohinder Suresh
- David Anders as Adam Monroe/Takezo Kensei
- Kristen Bell as Elle Bishop
- Dania Ramirez as Maya Herrera
- Dana Davis as Monica Dawson
- James Kyson Lee as Ando Masahashi
- Zachary Quinto as Gabriel Gray/Sylar

=== Recurring characters ===
- Jimmy Jean-Louis as The Haitian
- Adair Tishler as Molly Walker
- Stephen Tobolowsky as Bob Bishop
- Shalim Ortiz as Alejandro Herrera
- Nicholas D'Agosto as West Rosen
- Katie Carr as Caitlin
- Eriko as Yaeko
- Ashley Crow as Sandra Bennet
- Randall Bentley as Lyle Bennet
- Cristine Rose as Angela Petrelli
- Dianna Agron as Debbie Marshall

== Episodes ==
No. overall	No. in season	Title	Directed by	Written by	Original release date	US viewers (millions)
Volume Two: Generations
24	1	"Four Months Later..."	Greg Beeman	Tim Kring	September 24, 2007	16.97
In March 2007, Suresh and Bennet are conspiring to bring the Company down. Mohinder is hired by Bob Bishop of the Company. The Bennets have moved from Texas to California. Matt has divorced his wife, because she was pregnant from her affair, and is raising Molly with Mohinder. Molly has been having nightmares about a man who can see her. Hiro meets his hero Kensei in 1671 Japan, who is actually an Englishman. Twins Maya and Alejandro Herrera flee a murder charge and try to get to the United States to see Suresh's father, whom they do not know to be dead. Kaito is murdered. Peter is in Ireland and has amnesia. Nathan has become an alcoholic.
25	2	"Lizards"	Allan Arkush	Michael Green	October 1, 2007	11.96
Peter uses his powers and agrees to help the people who found him with their thefts. The Haitian reunites with Bennet. Maya kills people without touching them when under stress and then Alejandro revives them. Matt interviews Angela about Kaito's death. Kensei is revealed to be regenerative.
26	3	"Kindred"	Paul Edwards	J.J. Philbin	October 8, 2007	10.91
It turns out that D.L. is dead. Niki leaves Micah under the care of his great aunt in New Orleans with strict instructions to hide his ability. Peter gains the trust of Ricky, the leader of the Irish gang, and becomes romantically involved with his sister Caitlin. After eight surgeries, Sylar wakes up in Mexico with Candice. He kills her, but he is powerless. Hiro helps Kensei become a hero.
27	4	"The Kindness of Strangers"	Adam Kane	Tim Kring	October 15, 2007	11.41
Micah's cousin Monica Dawson discovers her own ability: muscle mimicking. Matt enlists Nathan's help to find the man who has been killing the Company founders, such as Kaito. Matt discovers that his father Maury was among the Company founders. Sylar joins Maya and Alejandro on their journey to New York.
28	5	"Fight or Flight"	Lesli Glatter	Joy Blake & Melissa Blake	October 22, 2007	9.44
A woman named Elle Bishop tries to find Peter and kills Ricky with her electric powers. Matt and Nathan visit Maury, who has put Molly into a deep sleep and has been giving her nightmares. Maury escapes and gives Matt and Nathan nightmares. Suresh sends Molly back to the Company for a cure, much to Noah's dismay.
29	6	"The Line"	Jeannot Szwarc	Adam Armus & Kay Foster	October 29, 2007	10.51
Peter and Caitlin go to Montreal after they find a plane ticket among Peter's possessions. Kensei betrays Hiro after Hiro kisses Kensei's love Yaeko.
30	7	"Out of Time"	Daniel Attias	Aron Eli Coleite	November 5, 2007	9.88
Hiro returns to the present. Peter accidentally teleports himself and Caitlin over a year into the future in New York and find that 93% of the world's population has died of the Shanti Virus. Then Peter accidentally teleports back and meets Kensei, who identifies himself as Adam Monroe. Niki is injected with the virus and Mohinder realizes that his blood no longer works as a cure. Matt defeats Maury by putting Maury in his own nightmare and finds that he can control others' minds.
31	8	"Four Months Ago..."	Greg Beeman	Tim Kring	November 12, 2007	11.16
The episode depicts flashbacks that show what happened between the first and second seasons. Peter is taken prisoner by the Company where he meets Elle until he escapes with Adam and gets his memory erased by the Haitian. D.L. is killed after a new personality of Niki's manifests. Maya reveals her power, which leads her and Alejandro to America in search for help. In present day, Peter remembers who he is.
32	9	"Cautionary Tales"	Greg Yaitanes	Joe Pokaski	November 19, 2007	10.81
The Bennet family prepares to go on the run before the Company finds them. Hiro goes back in time and discovers that Adam killed his father. Mohinder sides with the Company and kills Bennet by shooting him through the eye as depicted by Isaac's painting. However Bennet is revived by Claire's blood.
33	10	"Truth & Consequences"	Adam Kane	Jesse Alexander	November 26, 2007	11.89
Adam and Peter learn that the Shanti virus is being kept in Texas. Sylar kills Alejandro, Maya learns how to control her power, and Maya and Sylar make it to New York.
34	11	"Powerless"	Allan Arkush	Jeph Loeb	December 3, 2007	11.06
Peter finds out that Adam actually wants to unleash the virus and stops him from doing so. Hiro buries Adam alive by teleporting him into a coffin. Monica is kidnapped by a street gang and Niki saves her, but gets trapped in a burning, exploding building. Elle saves Mohinder, Maya, and Molly from Sylar's clutches. Sylar regains his powers using Claire's blood. Nathan has a press conference to go public with his power, but is shot before he can do so.

== Reception ==
The second season of Heroes was criticized by commentators and fans for a much slower pace, less engaging storyline and lack of focus compared to the first season. Milo Ventimiglia stated that "when there's a little bit of a delay, there's not that instant, rewarding scene or moment or episode... people get impatient, so it has been extremely important for them to strike a balance between giving and getting." In an interview with Entertainment Weekly, Heroes creator Tim Kring commented on criticisms of season two, and the series' 15% decline in ratings. Kring said that he felt he had made mistakes with the direction of season two. He had thought that the audience was looking for a "build-up of characters and the discovery of their powers", when viewers were instead looking for "adrenaline." Kring also outlined what he felt were problems with plot development, stating that the second season "took too long to get to the big-picture story", explaining that Peter's vision of the viral armageddon should have occurred in the first episode instead of the seventh. He feels that it would have been better to introduce new characters within the context of the main storyline, as with Elle, rather than in unattached arcs such as that of Maya and Alejandro. Kring also admitted that he should have resolved the "Hiro in Japan" storyline much more quickly, and that the romantic stories are not working well. With regard to Claire and West, and Hiro and Yaeko, he said, "I've seen more convincing romances on TV. In retrospect, I don't think romance is a natural fit for us."

In season two, the opener was consistent in the ratings, however, week-by-week, the ratings continued to dive, reaching another new low for the series on episode seven, "Out of Time", with only 9.87 million viewers. Although the ratings were lower than average, this episode was considered to be a turning point for the declining season, as a major plot twist was introduced and the volume's "big picture storyline" was presented. The season two/volume 2 finale generated 11.06 million viewers in the ratings, down more than 3 million viewers from the season opener and series pilot.

== Home media ==
The DVD and Blu-ray was released on August 26, 2008, in Region 1.
