= Lizards (Heroes) =

- Heroes episode
- Episode no.: Season 2 Episode 2
- Directed by: Allan Arkush
- Written by: Michael Green
- Production code: 202
- Original air date: 1 October 2007

Guest appearances
- Cristine Rose as Angela Petrelli; Ashley Crow as Sandra Bennet; David Anders as Takezo Kensei; Jimmy Jean-Louis as the Haitian; Nicholas D'Agosto as West Rosen; Barry Shabaka Henley as Det. Fuller; Holt McCallany as Ricky; Ivonne Coll as Nidia; Eriko Tamura as Yaeko; Shalim Ortiz as Alejandro Herrera; Dianna Agron as Debbie Marshall; Adair Tishler as Molly Walker; Katie Carr as Caitlin; Yareli Arizmendi as Healer; Stephen Tobolowsky as Bob Bishop; Dominic Keating as Will; Adetokumboh McCormack as Tuko; Mark Colson as Mr. Zern; Sara Soloman as Martha; Kurando Mitsutake as White Beard

Episode chronology
← Previous "Four Months Later..."	Next → "Kindred"
- Heroes season 2

"Lizards" is the second episode of the second season of the NBC superhero drama series Heroes. The episode was written by Michael Green and was directed by Allan Arkush. It originally aired on October 1, 2007.

== Plot ==
The Irish criminals who found Peter Petrelli shackled inside a cargo container are holding him captive. They violently interrogate him about the missing cargo (a shipment of iPods). Caitlin, the sister of Ricky, the leader of the criminal gang, tends to Peter, who is still unable to remember even his name.

Bob, the representative of the Company who hired Mohinder Suresh, sends Mohinder on an assignment, which turns out to be a mission to heal the Haitian.

Maya and Alejandro are struggling to get across the border, and are assisted by a woman named Nidia, a family friend. At her house, an unnamed healer tells her that no one can cure her disease, and that her curse is dark enough to kill the Devil himself.

Matt Parkman and Detective Fuller visit the roof of the Deveaux Building to investigate Kaito Nakamura's death, and learn that Angela Petrelli was present. Ando explains to Parkman that the helix symbol scrawled on the photograph of Kaito means "Godsend."

Parkman and the detective interview Mrs. Petrelli, who alludes to a prior sexual relationship with Kaito. She then realizes that Parkman is reading her thoughts, and mentally demands that he get out of her head.

Parkman greets Nathan Petrelli, who has arrived to post his mother's bail. As the two walk to the locked interrogation room to retrieve Mrs. Petrelli, she is apparently attacked by an unseen force. Parkman breaks in, but she is alone in the room, with blood on her face. In her hand is the picture of her with the helix symbol scrawled across it.

Hiro Nakamura, still in Japan in 1671, impersonates his hero, Takezo Kensei, in order to correct history. He uses his power to stop time and disarms 11 bandits, rescuing the swordsmith's daughter.

As they converse, she expresses her gratitude. Kensei, persuaded by Hiro's pleas — and the prospect of a relationship with the swordsmith's daughter — agrees to rescue the swordsmith, but is ambushed by the bandits Hiro earlier disarmed. Kensei appears to be killed by the bandits' arrows, but is somehow able to revive: his wounds heal while Hiro watches, amazed.

Claire Bennet, curious about the limits of her abilities, cuts off her little toe to see if it will grow back, which it does, but she discovers that West (who had been watching through her window) has seen the incident.

She tries to pursue him, only to find him gone and Chandra Suresh's book lying on her driveway.

The episode ends with her mother's dog, Mr. Muggles, barking at the sky.

== Critical reception ==
On the episode's original airdate, Heroes attracted 11.9 million viewers.

Sean O'Neal of The A.V. Club gave the episode a C.

Robert Canning of IGN scored the episode 7.9 out of 10
