= Out of Time (Heroes) =

- Heroes episode
- Episode no.: Season 2 Episode 7
- Directed by: Daniel Attias
- Written by: Aron Eli Coleite
- Production code: 207
- Original air date: November 5, 2007

Guest appearances
- Leonard Roberts as D.L. Hawkins; Cristine Rose as Angela Petrelli; Ashley Crow as Sandra Bennet; Nicholas D'Agosto as West Rosen; Jimmy Jean-Louis as the Haitian; Eriko as Yaeko; Cary-Hiroyuki Tagawa as the Swordsmith; Alan Blumenfeld as Maury Parkman; Katie Carr as Caitlin; Mark Harelik as DHS agent; Adair Tishler as Molly Walker; Stephen Tobolowsky as Bob Bishop; Randall Bentley as Lyle Bennet

Episode chronology
← Previous "The Line"	Next → "Four Months Ago..."
- Heroes season 2

"Out of Time" is the seventh episode of the second season of the NBC superhero drama series Heroes. It aired on November 5, 2007.

== Plot ==
As the episode opens, Takezo Kensei ties Hiro to a board, facing a haze of opium smoke, preventing Hiro from using his powers. Whitebeard had offered Kensei anything he wanted to capture Hiro and to lead his army. He chose to rule half of Japan and take Yaeko as his princess.

Soon after, while their guards are distracted, Yaeko frees herself and takes the opium away from Hiro. As the guards return, Hiro uses his newfound ability to instantly blow an opium high, teleporting himself, Yaeko, and Yaeko's father to safety.

Later in the night, he materializes in White Beard's armory where he plans on destroying the guns, only to find Kensei waiting for him. Though Hiro still has faith in him, Kensei attacks Hiro, provoking a sword fight. In the fight, a lantern is tipped over and the fire spreads to the gunpowder. Realizing they are in mortal danger, Hiro offers his hand to Kensei in order to escape, which Kensei refuses. Left with no choice, Hiro teleports away just before the tent explodes and later finds Kensei's helmet in the smoldering ruins from the fire.

When meeting with Yaeko, he cautions that in Kensei's final trial, he has to cut out his own heart to save her life and all of Japan. Hiro realizes he must return to his own time, and with a final kiss, he is gone.

Meanwhile, Ando sees the charred mask on his desk, turning around to see Hiro smiling at him. Their reunion, however, is dampened when Ando tells Hiro of his father's murder during his absence.

In Ukraine, Noah Bennet snaps photos of Isaac Mendez paintings and phones to tell Mohinder Suresh he has them after which he lights them all on fire. Mohinder hangs up the phone with Bennet as alarms blare.

Nathan Petrelli and Matt Parkman arrive with details on their encounter with Matt’s father, Maury Parkman. They say Maury is coming to kill Bob next, which causes Bob to begin evacuation procedures at the Company facility.

Peter Petrelli and Caitlin, still a year in the future in 2008, wander the streets of New York City, but the streets seem deserted; everyone has been evacuated by Homeland Security. An armored car speeds toward them and men in hazmat suits grab them, asking if they are sick or infected.

After he and Caitlin are hosed down, Peter asks what's going on. The officer in charge of Peter's admission to the quarantine facility shows him a storage room full of body bags through a window with a biohazard symbol in its corner, confirming the painting Isaac had done of him in the pictures Noah Bennet destroyed. The officer reveals that people in the general population are being affected by the Shanti virus and 93% of the world's population are dead while the rest are living in quarantine zones hoping for a cure to be found.

Later he meets his mother, who he does not recognize despite mentions of his brother and the fact that he's the most powerful of all the heroes due to his ability to mimic abilities.

Motivated by Angela's demands, he utilizes Parkman's mind reading ability and is able to rebuild some of his lost memories (specifically those relating to his mother). With flashbacks ensuing in his head, Peter finally remembers her and they share a tearful embrace. While being escorted through the facility by his mother, Peter sees Caitlin in a deportation line - he attempts to rescue Caitlin, but accidentally time travels back to the building in Montreal, leaving her behind.

Claire Bennet wakes up finding West in her kitchen preparing waffles for breakfast. When Claire's mom leaves the room, she scolds West for stopping by the house. He shows her a newspaper article about the drunk cheerleader claiming she saw a flying boy, and Claire tells West they have to be more careful.

Claire and West make out on the couch, but she can't stop looking at his tracking marks. They get up to go to the kitchen. When West turns around, he sees Mr. Bennet arrive home. He grabs Claire and runs outside, where she reveals that it was her father who abducted him. Scared and confused, West believes Claire deliberately led him into a trap and flies away.

Bob forces Mohinder to bait Maury Parkman so he can inject him with the virus. Mohinder worries that this might put the entire population at risk. Niki offers to "persuade" him to take the virus but Bob tells Matt he has the same abilities as Maury; anything one's brain controls, Matt can control as well, making him the only one who can counter Maury. Matt apologizes to an unconscious Molly Walker, adding that he doesn't have his father's abilities like Bob said. When Matt says, "I love you, Molly," there's a blip on her monitor.

Nathan asks Bob about "Adam Monroe," one of the founding members of the Company. He tells Nathan about the early days of the Company, when Adam convinced them they all belonged together to make the world a better place. Bob says that the "visionary" Adam is the one trying to kill them and he's using Maury as his "blunt weapon", to kill those in the Company.

Years before, Adam talked about holocausts, plagues, and punishing humanity to save the world, thoughts shared by Mr. Linderman, a "disciple" of Adam. They locked Adam up and threw away the key, but he escaped two weeks before. Bob tells Nathan that Peter is alive and somehow involved with Adam Monroe.

In the hall, Mohinder frets to Niki Sanders that it is morally unacceptable to give Maury the virus. Niki says no one will die, emphasizing that the Company saved her. When Mohinder leaves, she turns around and sees a vision of D.L. Hawkins who tells her she is a killer and by the end of the day, she will kill everyone.

When she leaves the hall, Maury Parkman emerges from a door. Mohinder catches Niki talking to D.L., who is not really there; an unseen Maury is manipulating her mind. Mohinder tries to help, but she punches him in the face, revealing how Mohinder ends up with his nose broken.

Bob shows Nathan a video of Peter taken at the Company facility. As they talk, Niki punches the door open (realizing another of Isaac's eight paintings) as Matt goes to find his father, only to walk into a dream world where Maury keeps Molly imprisoned. Matt calls for his father, and Maury appears, brought to the nightmare via Matt's newly realized abilities.

In the other room, Niki cannot fight off Maury's parasitic attachment to her mind and stabs herself with a syringe containing the virus. Matt summons all of his strength, grabs Molly, and walks out of the nightmare, leaving Maury trapped in what Matt realizes is Maury's own nightmare. Matt comes to in Molly's room where she wakes up to find Maury collapsed on the ground.

Mohinder gives Niki an infusion of his own blood to eradicate the virus in her system. However, when it does not work, Mohinder realizes that his blood no longer possesses humoral immunity and that the new strain of the virus is now completely incurable.

Bob says they will keep Maury sedated and destroy every last vial. Bob shows Mohinder Claire's file and says that she may be the only way to save Niki. He also tells Mohinder that Bennet killed Company operative Ivan. Mohinder confesses that he has been working with Bennet to take down the Company. Bob says there is a storm coming and that Claire's ability could cure the virus, before presenting him with the gun seen in the painting.

Bennet comes home and slaps the newspaper story about the drunk cheerleader in front of Claire, yelling at her for risking exposure. "It's not safe here, anymore," Bennet says. "Pack your bags... we're leaving." Instead of obeying, Claire angrily refuses to leave and runs upstairs.

Meanwhile, back in Montreal, Peter attempts to teleport back to the future to save Caitlin, but is unable to access his time powers. Suddenly distracted by a noise coming from behind him, Peter swings around and looses a bolt of electricity. A hand appears from behind a painting and catches the bolt, leaving the flesh charred and blackened, but instantly regenerates a moment later.

Takezo Kensei appears from behind the wall, revealing himself to be the mysterious Adam Monroe. Peter still doesn't recognize who Adam is. Adam comments to Peter, "We are going to change history."

== Critical reception ==
Until Season 3, "Out of Time" was the lowest rated episode of Heroes. It averaged only 9.87 million viewers in its original airing. In the 18-49 demographic, "Out of Time" earned a 4.9/11 ratings share.

Sean O'Neal of The A.V. Club gave the episode a C+.

Robert Canning of IGN scored the episode 8 out of 10.
