= Four Months Ago... =

- Heroes episode
- Episode no.: Season 2 Episode 8
- Directed by: Greg Beeman
- Written by: Tim Kring
- Production code: 208
- Original air date: November 12, 2007

Guest appearances
- Leonard Roberts as D.L. Hawkins; Cristine Rose as Angela Petrelli; Jimmy Jean-Louis as the Haitian; Shalim Ortiz as Alejandro Herrera; Nichelle Nichols as Nana Dawson; Rena Sofer as Heidi Petrelli; Stephen Tobolowsky as Bob Bishop; Carlon Jeffery as Damon Dawson

Episode chronology
← Previous "Out of Time"	Next → "Cautionary Tales"
- Heroes season 2

"Four Months Ago..." is the eighth episode of the second season of the NBC superhero drama series Heroes. The episode was written by series creator/executive producer Tim Kring and was directed by executive producer Greg Beeman. It originally aired on November 12, 2007. The episode explains what happened during the four months between the first two seasons.

== Plot ==
Peter runs into Adam Monroe at the warehouse in Montreal. Adam helps Peter recover his memory using his healing powers by thinking of his brother, Nathan.

Peter flashes back to four months earlier when Nathan is flying a radioactive Peter through the air above New York City. Nathan becomes progressively scarred due to the radiation, and Peter releases himself of his brother's grasp, knowing he would kill him if he exploded. Peter does explode, but flies down in time to save Nathan from falling to his death.

Peter takes a seriously injured Nathan to the hospital, but is then apprehended by Elle and Bob. They take Peter into the care of The Company and promise to help "cure" his powers, thus stopping him from ever being a threat to those around him.

Nathan remains in the hospital. He tells his wife, Heidi, the truth about his and Peter's incident, but his mother convinces her that he is delusional and that psychosis runs in the Petrelli family.

While Peter waits for the cure to be ready, he takes power-suppression pills and slowly comes to communicate with and befriend Adam, who currently resides in the adjacent cell. Adam eventually convinces Peter that The Company will not help him, and the two escape.

They go to the hospital where Nathan is being treated and give him an infusion of Adam's blood, which heals his scarring. As they try to escape, Elle, and the Haitian pursue them there. Adam tells Peter to meet him in Montreal, and the two split up.

While Elle electrocutes Adam, the Haitian chases down Peter, but instead of recapturing him, erases his memory and locks him in a storage crate. He does this, he says, in order to repay Peter's mother for helping him many years ago.

D. L. Hawkins survived his gunshot wound from "How to Stop an Exploding Man", and he, Niki and Micah start a new life together. Bob pays the medical bills and offers Niki medication to prevent a relapse of her split personality. Niki accepts the offer, but eventually stops taking the pills. A new personality named Gina manifests, takes over, and heads to L.A. to party.

Meanwhile, firefighters are battling a house fire and D.L goes inside to save a woman's child trapped in the home. D.L goes in the burning home and rescues the child. When he returns home, Micah says they have been airing his heroic deeds on TV and Micah considers him a hero.

He goes to see where Niki is and finds a message written on the mirror saying "Gone to L.A". D.L immediately assumes that Jessica has written it. D. L. follows her and reclaims Niki. However, he also assaults one of her fellow partiers, and the man later returns and shoots D. L. at point-blank range, killing him.

Alejandro Herrera has just gotten married, although his sister Maya disapproves of his new bride and also dislikes the idea of sharing her brother, who she is very close to. Her unease proves justified when she discovers the woman cheating on Alejandro with her old boyfriend at the wedding celebration.

Maya is furious and her power activates for the first time, killing everyone at the reception except herself and Alejandro. Maya admits to him that she is somehow responsible and flees.

Three months later, Alejandro tracks Maya down in a convent and turns her over to the police. Her power activates again, but Alejandro successfully brings it under control. Now understanding the horrid nature of Maya's ability, the siblings flee the church and begin their run from the police.

The episode ends in the present day, with Peter and Adam in Montreal. Peter stumbles after his memories come back to him. He tells Adam he remembers everything, to which Adam asks if they should start saving the world now. Peter smiles.

== Narration ==
At the beginning

It is man's ability to remember that sets us apart. We are the only species concerned with the past. Our memories give us voice. They bear the witness to history, so that others might learn, so they might celebrate our triumphs and be warned of our failures.

At the end

There are many ways to define our fragile existence, many ways to give it meaning. But it is our memories that shape its purpose and give it context. The private assortment of images, fears, loves, regrets. For it is the cruel irony of life that we are destined to hold the dark with the light, the good with the evil, success with disappointment. This is what separates us, what makes us human; and in the end, we must fight to hold on to.

== Production notes ==
The song playing in the club when D.L. Hawkins first finds Nikki dancing is "He's Frank - Slight Return" by The BPA and it features Iggy Pop.

The song playing in the background when D.L. Hawkins is shot dead is "We Interrupt This Programme" by Coburn.

== Critical reception ==
In the 18-49 demographic, "Four Months Ago..." earned a 5.2/12 ratings share, meaning 5.2% of all households with an 18- to 49-year-old living in it watched the episode, and 12% of all households tuned into the channel at any given moment. The episode was watched by 11.20 million viewers.

Sean O'Neal of The A.V. Club gave the episode a C+.

Robert Canning of IGN scored the episode 9 out of 10
