= Four Months Later... =

- Heroes episode
- Hiro is stuck in 1671 and is running away from a horde of Samurai. An editor has nominated the above file for discussion of its purpose and/or potential deletion. You are welcome to participate in the discussion and help reach a consensus.
- Episode no.: Season 2 Episode 1
- Directed by: Greg Beeman
- Written by: Tim Kring
- Production code: 201
- Original air date: 24 September 2007

Guest appearances
- Cristine Rose as Angela Petrelli; Ashley Crow as Sandra Bennet; Nicholas D'Agosto as West Rosen; David Anders as Takezo Kensei; Barry Shabaka Henley as Det. Fuller; Holt McCallany as Ricky; Eriko Tamura as Yaeko; Shalim Ortiz as Alejandro Herrera; Lyndsy Fonseca as April; Dianna Agron as Debbie Marshall; Lauren Stamile as Ms. Gerber; Brian Kimmet as Kyle Dilman; Adair Tishler as Molly Walker; George Takei as Kaito Nakamura; Stephen Tobolowsky as Bob Bishop; Randall Bentley as Lyle Bennet; Dominic Keating as Will; Adetokumboh McCormack as Tuko; Mark Colson as Mr. Zern; Sara Soloman as Martha

Episode chronology
← Previous "How to Stop an Exploding Man"	Next → "Lizards"
- Heroes season 2

"Four Months Later..." is the first episode of the second season of the NBC superhero drama series Heroes. The episode was written by Tim Kring and was directed by Greg Beeman. It originally aired on September 24, 2007. It was presented on iTunes on September 9 in HD and standard quality for free.

== Plot ==
The majority of this episode takes place four months after the events of Season 1's finale. In the chronology of the series, the Season 1 finale took place in November 2006, which dates this episode in March 2007. Also, Hiro's scenes take place in 1671.

Mohinder Suresh has been traveling around giving speeches about genetically abnormal individuals whom he believes are susceptible to an impending plague, the Shanti virus.

He is approached by a strange man named Bob, who offers him a job with the mysterious Company. Bob is shown to be able to turn objects into gold which he uses to provide funds for the company.

Afterwards Mohinder is shown calling Noah Bennet, revealing that Mohinder's speeches were a ruse to gain the attention of "the Company" that Bennet used to work for, so that Mohinder, with Noah's guidance, can bring it down from within.

Claire and Noah Bennet, under the assumed name of Butler, are on the campus of Claire's new high school in Costa Verde, California. Claire nearly gets run over by a boy named West, who later interacts with her in a science lab and in the school gymnasium. It is there that she stands up to head cheerleader Debbie, who was picking on another girl.

Debbie challenges her to perform a back tuck off of "the tower." Claire climbs the tower, then, remembering her father's words against "standing out," tells everyone that she can't do it. After the floor mats are removed and everyone has gone, she performs the feat, but apparently breaks a leg when landing on the bare floor. West walks in, and it is not clear whether he has witnessed her injury healing.

Matt Parkman is divorced from his wife and is taking care of Molly at Mohinder Suresh's apartment in Brooklyn. Parkman passes his NYPD detective examination, partially due to his use of telepathy.

Later that day, Parkman is confronted at Molly's school by her teacher because she is falling asleep in class (due to her nightmares) and drawing some rather disturbing pictures. The pictures are of dark eyes, often over her bed at night, and each prominently includes the helix symbol (one depicting the helix as a scar).

That evening Parkman tries to talk to Molly about her problems, but she gets upset and refuses to discuss it because she is afraid of the man she mentioned in "How to Stop an Exploding Man."

Later that night she has a nightmare, and Parkman uses his telepathy to hear part of her nightmare: a man's voice telling Molly he can see her. Molly then wakes up crying in Parkman's arms.

Hiro Nakamura lands in a grassy meadow. As he looks around him, he spots a group of samurai archers raising their bows towards him — he turns to run, but sees the warrior that they are about to attack, poised behind Hiro.

The subtitles then note that Hiro is outside Kyoto, Japan, in the year 1671. As the archers prepare to attack, a solar eclipse occurs and everyone stops to look at it. Hiro stops time as the archers release their arrows, then realizes the man being attacked is Takezo Kensei.

Hiro saves himself and Kensei by teleporting them both away from the conflict. After a series of misunderstandings, Hiro learns that Kensei is actually an Englishman who uses dirty tricks to win.

In Honduras, two fugitives, Maya and Alejandro Herrera, are trying to cross the border to escape homicide charges. Their conversation indicates that they must stay together, but the reason is not clear until Alejandro is separated from his sister soon afterwards by men from a transport truck.

Upon catching up to the truck, Alejandro finds his sister distraught, and the driver and all of the passengers dead, with a dark liquid flowing from their eyes; her power has apparently killed them. It seems that the manifestation of her ability is somehow related to her brother's presence. They continue to the border, intending to bury the bodies. (Further information on their background is given in the online novel.)

Nathan Petrelli, distraught over the assumed death of his brother, Peter, has been left by his wife and children, and has become an alcoholic.

While in a bar, he receives a call from Claire, who tells him that she needs to talk to someone. Nathan says he can't and hangs up. He looks in the mirror and sees a vision of a disfigured Nathan, apparently suffering from burns all over his face, presumably due to the nuclear explosion in the first season. He turns away, then looks back to the mirror to see his normal reflection.

It is then shown that West was watching Claire during her telephone conversation from outside her second-story window. He is shown to be hovering there and shortly flies off into the distance, revealing the power of self-propelled flight that Nathan also has.

Angela Petrelli and Kaito Nakamura separately each find a picture of themselves with a red helix scrawled thereon, which they both understand to indicate that they are to be murdered within 24 hours.

They meet on top of the Deveaux building and compare their pictures, which appear to be two separate pieces of a photograph that included them both. Kaito recounts that he and Angela, along with Charles Deveaux, Mr. Linderman, and Mr. Petrelli, were part of a group of twelve people that tried to find evolved humans, and then he and Angela speculate about which member of the group will be their assassin.

After Angela leaves and Ando is sent to get a sword for Kaito, a hooded figure appears on the roof.

Kaito mentions that of the members of the group, he didn't expect the assassin "to be you." The figure tackles Kaito over the side of the roof. Ando returns in time to see them both fall, but when he looks over the edge, only Kaito's body is seen on the ground below.

Hiro, still distraught that Kensei is not the hero he thought he was, tells him about Kensei's future tales where he saves the village of Ōtsu and takes the town's swordmaker's beautiful daughter as his princess.

At that moment, Hiro smells fire and looks behind him to see the village of Ōtsu burning to the ground. As Hiro and Kensei travel toward Ōtsu, a woman from the village encounters Kensei and takes his sword, stating that her father made the sword for him to defend the village with and denounces Kensei for leaving the village to be destroyed. Hiro pleads with Kensei to retrieve the sword and help, who loses patience with Hiro and knocks him unconscious.

At the end of the episode, three thieves are looking for a cargo container (#9109) in a shipyard located in Cork, Ireland. When they break into container 9109, they find Peter Petrelli, chained to one of the sides, wearing only pants and a helix necklace.

Expecting to find a shipment of iPods, they angrily threaten him. He defends himself with his powers and seems as shocked as his attackers when he produces lightning that knocks a gangster back. After being asked who he is, he appears to have amnesia and professes "I don't know...I don't know."

== Critical reception ==
On the episode's original airdate, Heroes attracted 16.97 million viewers.

Sean O'Neal of The A.V. Club gave the episode a B.

Robert Canning of IGN scored the episode 7.8 out of 10.
