= Truth & Consequences =

- Heroes episode
- Episode no.: Season 2 Episode 10
- Directed by: Adam Kane
- Written by: Jesse Alexander
- Production code: 210
- Original air date: November 26, 2007

Guest appearances
- Joanna Cassidy as Victoria Pratt; Ashley Crow as Sandra Bennet; Nicholas D'Agosto as West Rosen; Shalim Ortiz as Alejandro Herrera; Jaime Ray Newman as Young Victoria Pratt; Eijiro Ozaki as Young Kaito Nakamura; Adair Tishler as Molly Walker; Cory Hardrict as Hype Wilson; Katie Carr as Caitlin; Nichelle Nichols as Nana Dawson; Stephen Tobolowsky as Bob Bishop; Randall Bentley as Lyle Bennet; Carlon Jeffery as Damon Dawson

Episode chronology
← Previous "Cautionary Tales"	Next → "Powerless"
- Heroes season 2

"Truth & Consequences" is the tenth and penultimate episode of the second season of the NBC superhero drama series Heroes. It aired on November 26, 2007. On its initial airing, it received 11.89 million viewers.

== Plot ==
Peter Petrelli and Adam Monroe track down Victoria Pratt (Joanna Cassidy) in Searsmont, Maine, to learn the location of the Shanti virus.

When she sees Peter is working with Adam, she shoots them both and prepares to decapitate Adam, until Peter knocks her out. Once she is conscious, Peter reads her mind and discovers the virus is in Odessa, Texas. Pratt tries to shoot Peter, but Adam reacts and kills her.

Claire Bennet and her family are greeted by Bob, who gives them what he claims are the ashes of Noah Bennet. Bob assigns his daughter, Elle, to watch Claire. Claire confronts Elle and threatens to blow the whistle about the Company.

Bob and Mohinder Suresh argue over the use of Claire's blood to revive Noah. Claire's blood reinforces the antibodies in Mohinder's blood, making the cure for the virus viable again. Mohinder then insists that Bob assists him in destroying all variations of the virus.

Niki Sanders returns to New Orleans and tells her son, Micah that she is infected with a virus. Seeking comfort, Micah goes to get D.L.'s medal, but discovers that his cousin stole it in an attempt to sell Micah's expensive comics. He ended up getting jumped and lost all of Micah's expensive possessions.

Later, Monica wakes Micah and the two attempt to recover it, but Monica is kidnapped by the gang that it was passed on to.

Maya Herrera and Sylar are bonding over a picnic in a park. Maya manages to control her ability successfully when Sylar deliberately goads her in attempt to help her.

Alejandro is reading a newspaper clipping about Sylar's murder of his mother, and protests Maya's wish to see Mohinder with Sylar.

Alejandro later attacks Sylar, but Sylar uses a knife to kill him. He hides this from Maya, and the two kiss.

Hiro Nakamura informs Ando that the man that killed his father was Takezo Kensei and the two research Kaito's files to learn about Kensei's identity of Adam Monroe and his detention in 1977. Hiro then vows to avenge his father's murder.

At the end of the episode, Sylar reaches New York with Maya, and phones Mohinder, who is en route to New Orleans, with the cure to the virus. Sylar tells Mohinder that he has Molly, and won't leave her until Mohinder sees Maya.

Moments after Peter and Adam arrive at Primatech, Hiro arrives, stops time and charges at Peter, trying to attack Adam.

== Critical reception ==
In the 18-49 demographic, "Truth & Consequences" earned a 5.3/12 ratings share. The episode was watched by 11.90 million viewers.

Sean O'Neal of The A.V. Club gave the episode a B−.

Robert Canning of IGN commented that, while overloading the episodes was one of his major complaints, the episode was a "halfway decent" setup for "Powerless", the plot itself were "engaging" and that Quinto "shined" in the episode, and scored the episode 7.4 out of 10.

Television Without Pity gave the episode an A rating.
