= Cautionary Tales (Heroes) =

- Heroes episode
- Episode no.: Season 2 Episode 9
- Directed by: Greg Yaitanes
- Written by: Joe Pokaski
- Production code: 209
- Original air date: November 19, 2007

Guest appearances
- Cristine Rose as Angela Petrelli; Ashley Crow as Sandra Bennet; Nicholas D'Agosto as West Rosen; Barry Shabaka Henley as Detective Fuller; Adair Tishler as Molly Walker; Saemi Nakamura as Kimiko Nakamura; George Takei as Kaito Nakamura; Stephen Tobolowsky as Bob Bishop; Randall Bentley as Lyle Bennet; Sekai Murashige as Young Hiro Nakamura

Episode chronology
← Previous "Four Months Ago..."	Next → "Truth & Consequences"
- Heroes season 2

"Cautionary Tales" is the ninth episode of the second season of the NBC superhero drama series Heroes. It aired on November 19, 2007.

== Plot ==
The Bennet family is preparing to go on the run, but Claire refuses. Noah intends to force her, but Sandra interrupts and postpones the departure until that night. Mohinder ultimately shoots Bennet in the eye as predicted by the painting. West flies Claire back home, where she breaks the news to her mother.

Hiro goes back in time to save his father, who does not wish to be saved. Before returning to the present, Hiro time-freezes the murder in order to learn the identity of his father's killer – Takezo Kensei.

Matt starts manifesting the ability to implant suggestions in others' minds.

Bennet is given a transfusion of Claire's blood, reviving him and healing his eye.

== Critical reception ==
Sean O'Neal of The A.V. Club gave the episode an A−.

Robert Canning of IGN scored the episode 7.5 out of 10
