= Powerless (Heroes) =

- Heroes episode
- Episode no.: Season 2 Episode 11
- Directed by: Allan Arkush
- Written by: Jeph Loeb
- Production code: 211
- Original air date: December 3, 2007

Guest appearances
- Cristine Rose as Angela Petrelli; Ashley Crow as Sandra Bennet; Nicholas D'Agosto as West Rosen; Adair Tishler as Molly Walker; Cory Hardrict as Hype Wilson; Stephen Tobolowsky as Bob Bishop; Randall Bentley as Lyle Bennet

Episode chronology
← Previous "Truth & Consequences"	Next → "The Second Coming"
- Heroes season 2

"Powerless" is the 11th and final episode of the second season of the NBC superhero drama series Heroes and thirty-fourth episode overall. It was written by co-executive producer Jeph Loeb and directed by executive producer Allan Arkush. The episode aired on December 3, 2007, as the conclusion of the "Volume 2: Generations" storyline. It is also the final episode of Heroes that was ready for broadcast prior to the 2007–2008 Writers Guild of America strike, and acted as the season finale pending the resolution of the dispute.

The episode's main storylines revolve around Peter Petrelli (Milo Ventimiglia) and Hiro Nakamura's (Masi Oka) quest to stop the release of the Shanti virus, and Sylar's (Zachary Quinto) attempt to regain his powers. The end of the episode features a brief prologue of the third volume, "Villains", which features Sylar regaining his powers. Originally, the virus was going to be released, and Tim Kring said that it was to play a big role in Volume 3. Kring stated that the ending had to be rewritten because they did not know when the show would return to air, and they wanted to make sure that they tied up all the loose ends. "Powerless" was watched by eleven million Americans and received mainly positive reviews from critics, with many saying that it was a positive end to a lackluster season.

== Plot ==
Peter Petrelli and Adam Monroe break into the Primatech compound in Odessa to destroy the Shanti virus, a life-threatening disease that prevents evolved humans from using their abilities, ultimately ending in their death.

Peter uses his powers to force the vault open, and is confronted by Hiro Nakamura, Nathan Petrelli and Matt Parkman. Nathan convinces Peter that Adam is trying to release the virus, not destroy it.

Adam lets the virus fall just before Hiro teleports them both away. Peter manages to telekinetically grab the virus and vaporize it in his hands.

After Monica Dawson is captured by a street gang, Micah Sanders turns to his mother Niki. Although Niki's powers are decreasing due to the virus, she agrees to help.

They find Monica tied up in a burning abandoned warehouse. Using what remains of her superhuman strength, Niki helps Monica escape, but her strength fails and she ends up trapped inside the building as it explodes.

Bob Bishop tells Noah Bennet that his daughter Claire Bennet is trying to expose The company and that they will have to take drastic measures.

Noah goes home and tells Claire not to expose The company, informing her that he will work for them and in exchange his family will be left alone to lead normal lives.

While searching her father Bob's office, Elle Bishop discovers a video surveillance feed showing Sylar in Mohinder Suresh's lab.

Sylar forces Mohinder to restore his powers. Maya Herrera learns that her brother was killed by Sylar. When confronted he shoots her in the chest. Sylar has Mohinder test Claire's restorative blood by reviving Maya.

As she returns to life, Elle enters the laboratory and attacks Sylar. He escapes, but takes the blood with him.

Nathan calls a press meeting after deciding to expose the nature of the heroes and The company. As he is about to announce his ability to fly, he is shot in the chest by an unknown assailant (which turns out to be Future Peter Petrelli.)

Angela Petrelli watches a television news report about her son's attack as she speaks to an unidentified person on the phone. She calmly and firmly states that she understands the reason for the attack on Nathan, but that the assassination attempt has "opened Pandora's box".

Following the end of Volume Two a brief prologue of Volume Three plays.

Sylar, bloodied and hurt from Elle's attack, injects himself with the supply of Claire's blood that he took from Mohinder. His wounds heal immediately, and he is able to use his telekinetic abilities. The scene ends with Sylar saying, "I'm back".

== Production ==
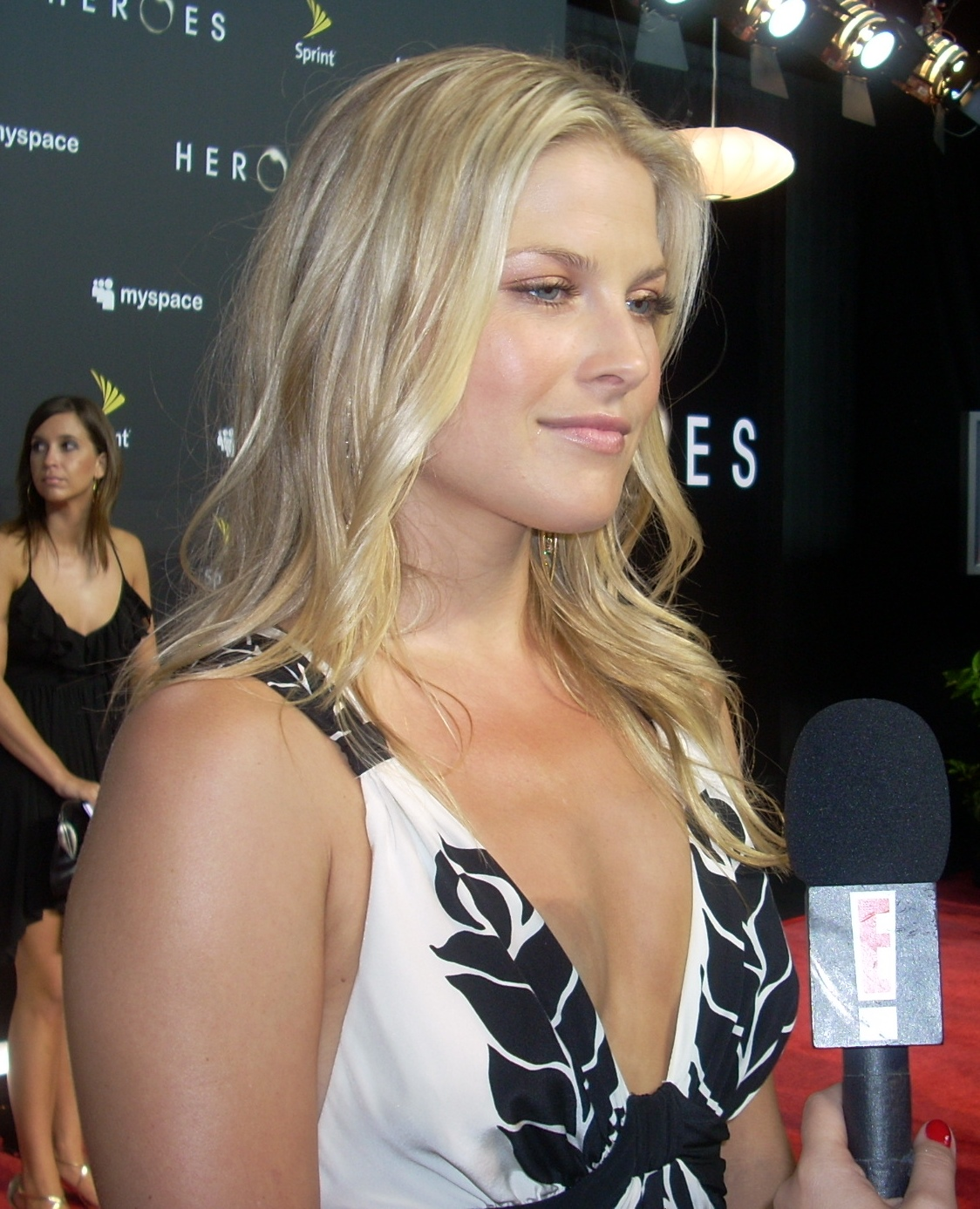
As of the end of "Powerless", the fate of Niki Sanders (Ali Larter) was "up in the air".

The episode was originally conceived to be the conclusion of "Generations", the second volume in the series, as Kring wanted to have shorter volumes than in season one. As such, "Powerless" was timed to coincide with the Heroes winter hiatus. With the interruption in production as a result of the Writers' Strike, Kring re-wrote elements of the episode to act as "a de facto season finale" if there were no additional episodes the second season.

Allan Arkush and Kring revealed in an interview on The Post Show that many parts of the finale were re-shot due to the Writers' Strike. Kring and Arkush commented that they re-shot the scene in which Peter telekinetically caught the virus. In the original cut, the virus was to shatter and be released. Kring admitted that the virus being released was to play a huge role in Volume 3, however, they decided to go into a different direction and re-shoot the ending, allowing Peter to catch the virus and destroy it. Kring also commented that the scenes where Matt, Peter and Nathan were talking in the vault were rewritten in and added later, as well as the Press Conference scene and the scene with Angela Petrelli talking on the cell phone. Kring and Arkush stated that the ending had to be rewritten and re-shot because they did not know when the show would return to air, due to the Writer's Strike, and they wanted to make sure that they tied up all the loose ends.

As of the end of this episode, the status of three main characters remained undetermined. Niki Sanders was last seen inside a burning building which subsequently exploded, and Nathan Petrelli was shot while attempting to speak out against the company. Their fates were left intentionally ambiguous because the writers were unsure of whether they wanted to proceed with Niki and Nathan's characters; decisions were made following the Writers' Strike resolution. As for the fate of Adam Monroe, Kring was more direct, saying "we've given the audience no reason to believe that Adam can figure a way to get out of there. The fact that he can live forever makes this the most gruesome of internments. If this happened to any of us, at least we'd know we'd soon have the mercy of death. Not here." Two of the series' villains also saw changes. Elle's decision to take on Sylar gave her a chance to use her abilities to help rather than to hurt people. Kring says "she's been given an opportunity to use her powers in a good way. And she absolutely likes the sound of that word 'hero'." Sylar's use of the stolen sample of Claire Bennet's blood led to the restoration of his abilities. According to Kring, "Sylar getting his power back does not bode well for our heroes." Originally, Sylar was not supposed to get his abilities back due to Zachary Quinto's commitment to the new Star Trek film. However, due to the Writers' Strike, Quinto completed his role in the film by the time Heroes returned to production.

== Reception ==
"Powerless" was viewed live or recorded and watched within six hours of broadcast by 11.06 million Americans, ranking seventeenth in the weekly charts.

Robert Canning of IGN felt that this episode was "exciting [and] pulse-pounding", being "the best episode of the season". He continued by saying that it "almost made you forget the sub-par episodes [you] had to sit through to get [there]", and hoped it would be a set-up for a "powerful, more consistent Volume Three". He ended his review by giving the episode 9.5 out of 10, the highest rating he had given for the second season. Stephen Lackey of Mania gave the episode an "A" grading, though he felt it was "rushed overall" and thought the virus story was not as powerful as the explosion story in season one. Jason Hughes of TV Squad also felt that the stage was set for a good third volume, which he hoped would "get even darker and more dangerous". Sean Elliott of If gave the episode a "B" grading, saying it was an "anti-climactic ending to an uninspired second season". He liked Kristen Bell's character Elle, saying she was "interesting", and "worth exploring and developing". He said that his favourite part of the episode was that the "season [was] finally over", and that it was "time to clean the slate and start with something better". Robin Brownfield of SyFy Portal called it a "great finale" and said that "there were lots of twists [she] did not see coming". Sean O'Neal of The A.V. Club gave the episode a A−.
