= Sure (album) =

Studio album by Eriko Tamura
- Released: September 22, 1993
- Recorded: 1993
- Genres: J-pop; dance-pop
- Length: 45:46
- Languages: Japanese; English
- Label: Eastworld

Eriko Tamura chronology
Ima no Watashi de... (1992)	Sure (1993)	Ballad (1994)

Singles from Sure
- 1. "Ningyō no T-shirt" Released: August 4, 1993; 2. "Ashita no Yukue" Released: December 8, 1993

Sure (シュア, Shua) is the eighth and final studio album by Japanese entertainer Eriko Tamura. Released through Eastworld on September 22, 1993, the album features the singles "Ningyō no T-shirt" and "Ashita no Yukue", as well as covers of the Debbie Gibson songs "Out of the Blue" and "Shake Your Love".

== Track listing ==
All music is composed by Dennis Belfield and Joey Carbone, except where indicated.

No.	Title	Lyrics	Music	Length
1.	"Out of the Blue"	Deborah Gibson	Gibson	3:54
2.	"Tōku de Wagamama Kīte" ((遠くでわがままきいて; "Be Selfish in the Distance"))	Eriko Tamura		3:47
3.	"Wash Out the Hurt"	Tamura		4:53
4.	"Dear..."	Rui Serizawa		4:44
5.	"X-Day" (Ekkusu Dē (Xデー))	Serizawa		4:54
6.	"Kara Kara Tenki" ((Kara Kara 天気; "Kara Kara Weather"))	Serizawa		3:50
7.	"Chikyū no Ura de Aimashō" ((地球の裏で会いましょう; "See You Behind the Scenes"))	Serizawa		3:59
8.	"Ningyo no T-shirt" (Ningyo no Tīshatsu (人魚のTシャツ; "Mermaid T-shirt"))	Chinfa Kan		4:45
9.	"Shake Your Love" (Japanese Version)	Gibson; Tamura	Gibson	3:48
10.	"Ashita no Yukue" ((明日の行方; "Whereabouts of Tomorrow"))	Tamura		3:44
11.	"Kaze no Rinkaku" ((風の輪郭; "Wind Contour"))	Serizawa		3:29
Total length:				45:46
