= Idol Densetsu Eriko =

Japanese anime series

- Cover of the first DVD-box

アイドル伝説えり子 (Aidoru Densetsu Eriko)
- Anime television series
- Directed by: Tetsurō Amino
- Produced by: Masahiko Miyoshi (TV Setouchi); Tomoyuki Taguchi (Big West)
- Written by: Takao Koyama
- Music by: Toshiyuki Watanabe
- Studio: Ashi Productions
- Original network: TXN (TV Setouchi, TV Tokyo)
- Original run: April 3, 1989 – March 26, 1990
- Episodes: 51
- Manga
- Written by: Ayumi Kawahara
- Published by: Kadokawa Shoten
- Magazine: Asuka
- Original run: 1989 – 1990
- Volumes: 3

Idol Densetsu Eriko (アイドル伝説えり子, Aidoru Densetsu Eriko; Legendary Idol Eriko) is a Japanese anime series by Ashi Productions that aired from 1989 until 1990, spanning 51 episodes. The story has been adapted into a three-volume manga series by Ayumi Kawahara.

== Plot ==
The series follows titular character Eriko Tamura (田村 えり子, Tamura Eriko), who is based on real-life Japanese singer of the same name that performs the opening and last episode's ending themes. She is the only daughter of Yuusuke Tamura (田村 雄介, Tamura Yūsuke), chairman of renowned music company Tamura Productions, and former singer Minako Tamura (田村 美奈子, Tamura Minako). Eriko, who has possessed a talent for singing since birth, was thrown in turmoil when her parents were involved in a car accident which killed her father and left her mother in a coma. Inspired by them, Eriko takes part in singing, a path they did not want their daughter to pursue. When Eriko's uncle sets out to destroy her career, she becomes an idol and attract nationwide fans.

Each episode is divided into three parts: The first 40 episodes cover the period from Eriko's debut to winning the award, 41 until 48 are standalone episodes, while episodes 49 until 51 cover Eriko's disappearance.
