= BrandAID Project =

Brandaid
- Founded: February 2009
- Founder: David Belle, Cameron Brohman, Paul Haggis, and Tony Pigott
- Website: BRANDAID

The Brandaid Project is a non-profit global venture that aims to use micromarketing to help solve the problems of uneven global income distribution. It attempts to do this by supporting and promoting the work of artisans in the developing world in the following way: The Brandaid Foundation, an arm of the Brandaid project, funds the training of artisans and funds the establishment of better living and working conditions for artisan communities. Brandaid Collections, the other arm of the Brandaid project, helps sell the crafted objects these artisans make. The profits from sales are shared between the artisans, the Brandaid foundation and investors.

The project claims Josh Brolin, Diane Lane, and Jimmy Jean-Louis as its patrons. It has partnerships with UNESCO, as part of UNESCO's Global Alliance For Cultural Diversity, CARE, which advises and invests in Brandaid, the Ciné Institute, and the Saatchi Gallery.
