= The Post Show =

- Starring: Blair Butler and Kevin Pereira
- Country of origin: United States
- No. of episodes: 6

Production
- Running time: 30 minutes with commercials

Original release
- Network: G4
- Release: November 3, 2007 – 2007

Related
- Heroes

The Post Show is an interactive television aftershow on G4, covering the NBC series Heroes.

== Overview ==
The Post Show is a live, half-hour wrap-up show which premiered Saturday, November 3, 2007 on G4. The show features multiple interactive and web-enabled elements, including live chats and polls, interviews with cast and crew members, and tips on what to look for in upcoming episodes. G4 viewers are able to take part in the live and interactive show; fans are able to use web cams and instant messaging to join in live discussions, voice their opinions, and provide theories on how future episodes will play out. G4 accepts fan submissions for The Post Show using Stickam.

The show is regularly hosted by Blair Butler and Kevin Pereira. In the Fall Finale Post Show, James Kyson Lee co-hosted, as Kevin Pereira was not present. Tim Kring and Jack Coleman were guests on the premiere episode as well as editors from Heroes Wiki and Heroes-Clues who had recurring appearances on the show's Conspiracy Theories segment. The Fall Finale episode of the show was a one-hour special and featured appearances by Jack Coleman, Dania Ramirez, Jimmy Jean-Louis, Allan Arkush, George Takei and Tim Kring.
