= Jimmy Jean-Louis =

Haitian actor (born 1968)

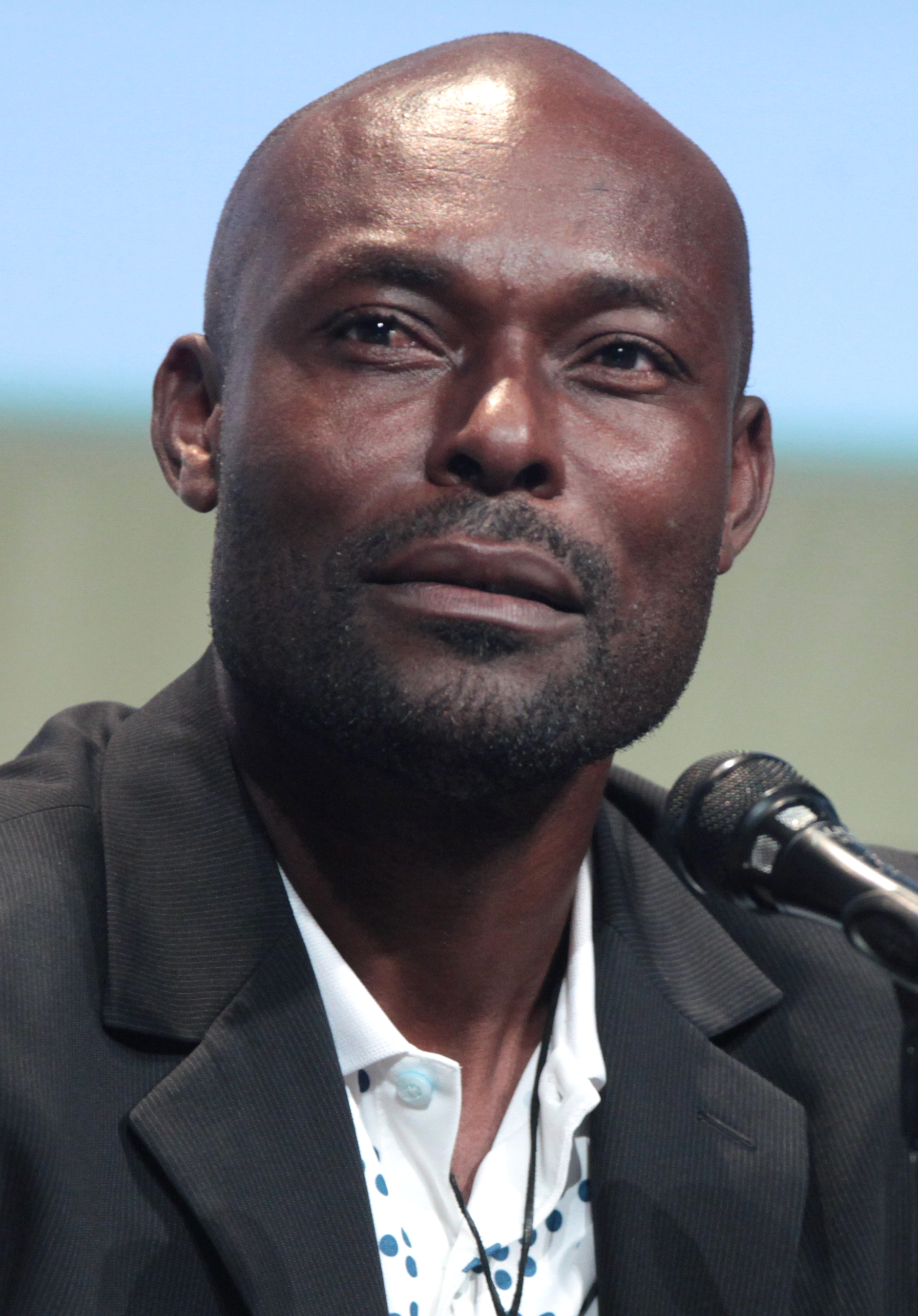
- Jean-Louis at the 2015 San Diego Comic-Con
- Born: August 8, 1968 (age 58); Pétion-Ville, Haiti
- Occupations: Actor; producer
- Years active: 1993–present
- Spouse: Evelyn
- Children: 3

Jimmy Jean-Louis (born August 8, 1968) is a Haitian actor and producer. Born in Pétion-Ville, he moved to Paris at a young age with his family in search of a better life. His early roles were in French television commercials and Spanish musical theatre. Eventually settling in Los Angeles in the late 1990s, he had small roles in The Bourne Identity, Tears of the Sun and Arliss before breaking into larger roles in American television and film. He played the character of "the Haitian" on the NBC television series Heroes from 2007 to 2010. He played the title character in the 2012 French telefilm Toussaint Louverture. In 2024, he co-produced and acted in the Indian film The Goat Life alongside Prithviraj.

== Early life ==
Jimmy Jean-Louis was born in Pétion-Ville, near Port-au-Prince, Haiti. He lived there until the age of twelve, when he moved to Paris with his family to pursue a modeling career. After moving he experienced a culture shock because of the rural to city lifestyle change. He enrolled in business courses, but quickly realized that his heart lay in performance, and studied at the Académie Internationale de la Danse. His parents returned to Haiti, but Jean-Louis and his brother remained in Paris. Around a decade later in 1991, producers discovered Jean-Louis during one of his dancing stints in a French club. They tapped him to appear in a Coca-Cola advertisement, the success of which prompted Jean-Louis to spend several years modeling across Europe. In London he worked for brands including Gianfranco Ferré and Valentino. Before finding success as a model, he was homeless at times in Paris. By the mid-'90s, he had appeared in music videos for Ophelie Winter, En Vogue, Mariah Carey, Seal, and George Michael. He also began appearing in low-budget independent films in Los Angeles.

== Acting career ==
He worked in musical theatre in Barcelona, Spain, spending three years with musical theater "La Belle Epoque", before moving to Italy where he worked as a model. He had secondary roles in Tears of the Sun, Hollywood Homicide, Monster-in-Law and The Game of Their Lives. He was cast as the romantic lead in the 2006 film Phat Girlz starring opposite Mo'Nique as her love interest. He was cast in the recurring role of The Haitian on the NBC television series Heroes, playing a character who is an associate of Noah Bennet. In an interview on The Post Show on G4, Jean-Louis stated that the Haitian was originally supposed to be from New Zealand, and that the character was going to be named "The Kiwi". He stated that he auditioned three times for the role of D.L. Hawkins, a part which he did not get.

In 2013, it was announced that Jean-Louis had been cast in a recurring role in Arrow. He portrayed "The Captain", an associate of Professor Ivo. In 2015, he took on a supporting role in the British film, The Cursed Ones. He had a recurring role on season one of Claws but was upgraded to a starring role in season 2.

In 2018, he was a jury member at the Monte-Carlo Television Festival and Angouleme Film Festival. In 2019 he both produced and starred in 'Rattlesnakes', based on the stage play by Graham Farrow.

In 2024, He co-produced and acted in The Goat Life, an Indian-Malayalam language movie. he played the role of a Somali man named Ibrahim Kadhar who had knowledge of escape routes.

== Personal life ==
Jean-Louis and his wife Evelyn have three children. He enjoys watching and playing soccer and is a member of an amateur soccer club Hollywood United F.C., a team consisting mostly of celebrities and former professionals. He is fluent in five languages: English, French, Spanish, Italian, and Haitian Creole.

Jean-Louis received the key to Miami-Dade County on January 10, 2010 from Mayor Carlos Alvarez. He also received the key to the city of North Miami on May 3, 2018 from Mayor Joseph Smith.

He is a patron of the BrandAID Project.

=== 2010 Haiti earthquake efforts ===
After the 2010 Haiti earthquake, Jean-Louis went to Haiti to search for his elderly parents in Haiti the day after a powerful earthquake struck the nation. Jean-Louis learned that a house he had grown up in collapsed, killing several of his relatives. He is the founder of Hollywood Unites for Haiti, a non-profit charitable aid organization whose original mission was to provide sports and cultural education to underprivileged youth on the island. The group mobilized for disaster relief after the magnitude-7 earthquake. Jean-Louis has taken part in a series of campaigns for Haitian aid, such as singing in the "We Are the World" remake of the original for Haiti in February 2010 which aired during the start of the Olympic Games in Vancouver. As the Ambassador of the Pan American Development Foundation for Haitian children, Jean-Louis testified to the United States Congress on their behalf in 2010.

Jean-Louis was named Ambassador-at-large to Haiti by President Michel Martelly in 2014.

== Awards ==
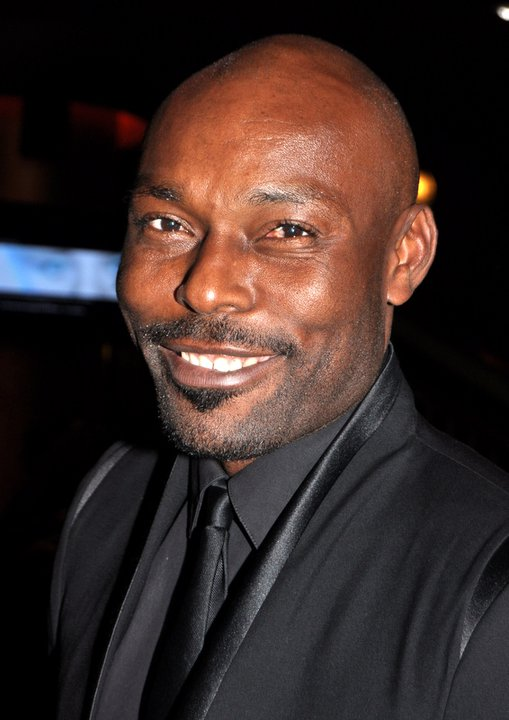
Jimmy Jean-Louis at the Golden Stars of French cinema ceremony in 2011.

- 2012 Best Actor Nomination (Toussaint Louverture (film)) - Monte-Carlo Television Festival
- 2012 Best Actor Nomination (Toussaint Louverture (film)) - Africa Movie Academy Awards
- 2012 MPAH Haiti Movie Awards Honorary Award * Motion Picture Association of Haiti
- 2012 Meilleur Acteur - Festival Vues_d'Afrique
- 2012 Best Actor Toussaint Louverture (film) - Pan African Film Festival
- 2013 Excellence in the Arts prize - Caribbean American Heritage Award
- 2015 Best Documentary Nomination (Jimmy Goes to Nollywood) - Monte-Carlo Television Festival
- 2015 Best Documentary Nomination (Jimmy Goes to Nollywood) - Africa Movie Academy Awards
- 2017 Best Supporting Actor - Hollywood African Prestigious Awards
- 2019 Career Achievement Award - Montreal International Black Film Festival
- 2019 Meilleur Acteur de la Diaspora Africaine (Desrances) - Sotigui Awards
- 2019 Sotigui D'Or - Sotigui Awards
- 2019 Impact In Entertainment Award - Face2Face Africa
- 2020 Best Actor Win at the Africa Movie Academy Awards
- 2023 Best Supporting Actor Win at the Africa Movie Academy Awards

== Filmography ==
=== Film ===
Year	Film	Role	Notes
2002	Derailed	Henry	
2002	The Bourne Identity	Wombosi bodyguard #5	Uncredited
2003	Tears of the Sun	Gideon	
2003	Hollywood Homicide	Gianfranco Ferre Clerk	
2003	This Girl's Life	Action Jackson	
2005	Monster-in-Law	Prince Amir	
2005	Age of Kali	Ferdinand	
2005	The Game of Their Lives	Joe Gaetjens	
2006	Phat Girlz	Dr. Tunde Jonathan	
2006	Cousines	Ralph	Haitian film
2006	Le President a-t-il Le Sida	Dao	Haitian Film by Arnold Antonin
2008	Diary of a Tired Black Man	James	
2008	Adventures of Power	Aubelin	
2008	Loaded	Antonio	
2008	The Ball is Round	Jay Jay Mfede	Also known as Golden Goal! (USA)
2009	Orpailleur	Myrtha	
2009	Moloch Tropical	Francis	
2009	I Sing of a Well	Narrator	
2010	Coursier	Loki	French film
2010	Sinking Sands	Jimah Sanson	
2010	Relentless	Candidate	
2010	The Penthouse	Buzz McManus	
2011	A Butterfly Kiss	L'homme au tableau	
2012	Toussaint Louverture	Toussaint Louverture	French telefilm
2013	One Night In Vegas	Nick	
2013	Doctor Bello		
2013	The Mark of the Angels-Miserere	Puyferrat	
2013	Five Thirteen	JJL	
2015	The Cursed Ones	Paladin	UK/Ghanaian film by Zissou Pictures Ltd.
2015	Joy	Toussaint	
2016	The Empty Box	Toussaint	
2017	Cargo	Jean	
2017	Catastropico	Damien	
2017	Esohe	Gary Baba	Nigerian/USA film
2018	The Outer Wild	Ramson	
2019	Rattlesnakes	Robert McQueen	
2019	Desrances	Francis Desrances	
2019	Everything But A Man	Max	
2020	Citation	Lucien N'Dyare	
2020	Rise	Modu	
2022	Detective Knight: Rogue	Godwin Sango	
2022	Detective Knight: Redemption	Godwin Sango	
2023	Detective Knight: Independence	Godwin Sango	
2023	Assassin Club	Inspector Leon	
2023	Jagged Mind	Papa Juste	
2024	Aadujeevitham	Ibrahim Khadiri	Indian Malayalam-language film Also producer
2024	Dead Money	Faizel	
2025	July 7	Renel Monise	
2025	The fire and the Moth	Contractor	
2026	The Creek	John West	
2026	Viper	Shadow	
2026	Melodrama	Aimé	

=== Television ===
Year	Title	Role	Notes
1993	Emmanuelle Forever		
1993	Emmanuelle's Love		
1993	Emmanuelle's Magic	Tribesman in the hut	
1993	Emmanuelle's Secret		
1993	Emmanuelle in Venice		
2001	Arliss	Caesar Montenez	1 episode
2003	The District	Jean-Paul Bertrand	1 episode
2003	Fastlane	Haitian #1	1 episode
2005	Dr. Vegas	Xola	1 episode
2005	The Shield	Ididsa Okoye	Episode: "A Thousand Deaths"
2006–2009	Heroes	The Haitian	Recurring role (32 episodes)
2007	Heroes Unmasked	Himself	3 episodes
2010	Entertainment Tonight	Himself	February 4, 2010
2010	The Mo'Nique Show	Himself	February 4, 2010
2013	Arrow	The Captain	Recurring role
2014	Extant	Pierre Lyon	2 episodes
2015	Heroes Reborn	The Haitian	Recurring role (6 episodes)
2017	Claws	Dr. Gregory Ruval	Recurring role (season 1); Starring role (season 2)
2017	The Brave	Lieutenant	1 episode
2017	Juste un regard	Eric Toussaint	6 episodes
2017	The Way	Inspector Morand	10 episodes
2018	S.W.A.T.	Sal Desir	1 episode
2019	SMILF	Henri	1 episode
2022	Tropiques criminels (Deadly Tropics)	Captain Clément Galpin	Episode: "La Baie des Anglais"
