= Eriko Tamura =

Japanese actress and singer

- 田村 英里子
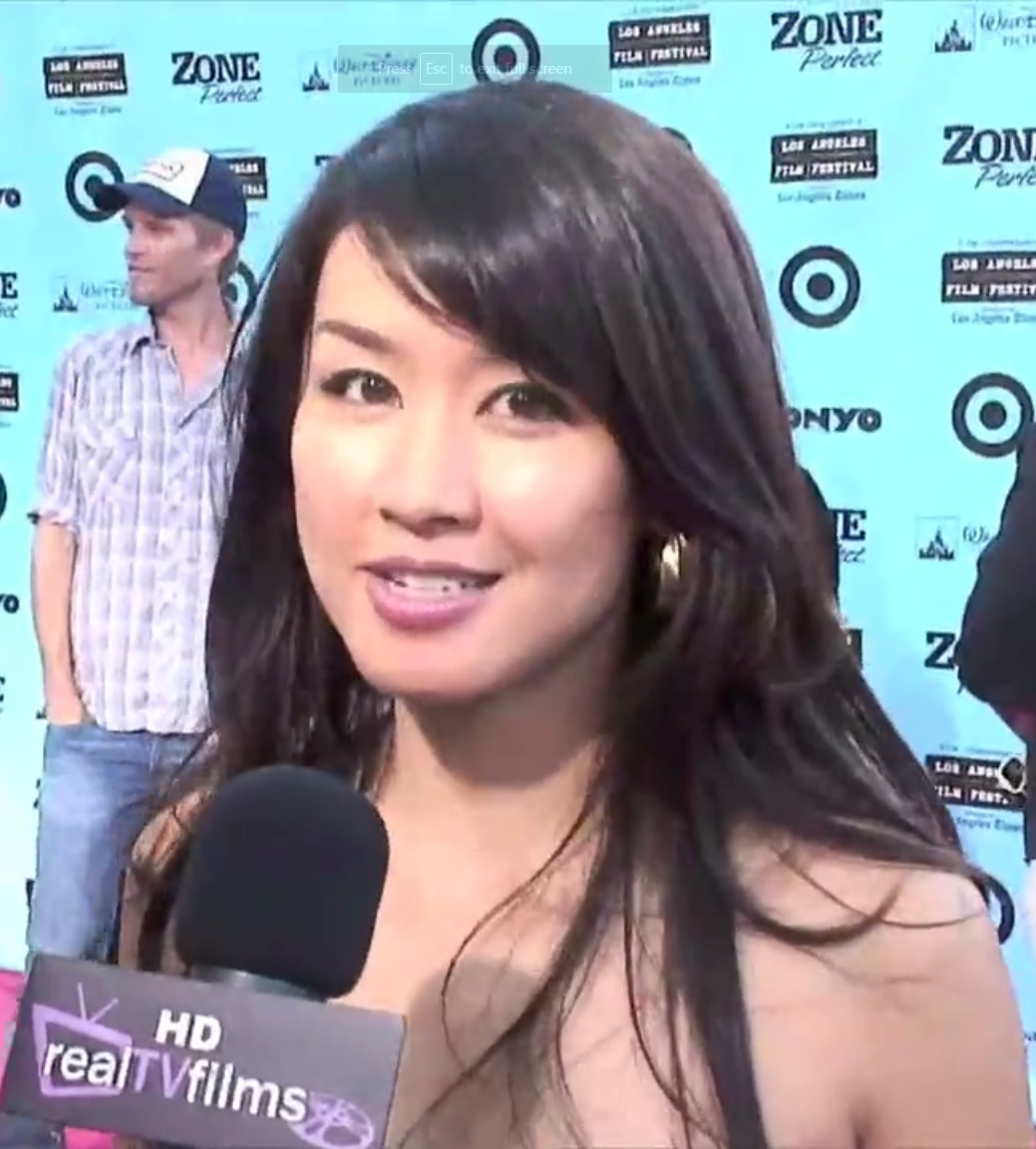
- Tamura interviewed by RealTVfilms in 2009
- Born: January 16, 1973 (age 53); Ibaraki Prefecture, Japan
- Other name: Eririn (nickname)
- Occupations: Actress, singer
- Years active: 1989–present
- Agent: Creative Artists Agency (U.S.)
- Television: Idol Densetsu Eriko
- Musical career
- Instrument: Vocals

Eriko Tamura (田村 英里子, Tamura Eriko; born on January 16, 1973, in Ibaraki Prefecture, Japan), sometimes credited only as Eriko, is a Japanese actress and singer. Her anime series Idol Densetsu Eriko (Legendary Idol Eriko) has been syndicated worldwide, airing in such countries as France, Italy, India and Spain. In live action series, she portrayed Princess Yaeko in the television show Heroes and Mai, the villainess in the feature film Dragonball Evolution.

== Career ==
Tamura grew up in Düsseldorf, Germany, and lived there for six years with her family from the age of 8 to the age of 13. Tamura (who speaks fluent English, German, and Japanese) has starred in over 20 films and television series in Japan. Tamura is a recording artist. She has released 10 original albums and 18 singles with record label EMI. Tamura has toured all over Japan, giving concert performances in such venues as the prestigious Nippon Budokan.

In the United States, Tamura has appeared in the NBC series, Heroes as Princess Yaeko, a love interest of Hiro Nakamura and Takeso Kensei. In 2009, Tamura also played a leading role, Mai, the villainess in the 20th Century Fox feature Dragonball Evolution. Also in 2009, Tamura played Sock's stepsister in season 2 of Reaper.

The anime series entitled Idol Densetsu Eriko (Legendary Idol Eriko) was created as a result of her popularity. The show has been translated into six languages and syndicated worldwide, airing in such countries as France, Italy, India, and Spain.

Tamura won a celebrated American Idol-esque competition in Japan at the age of 14, soon after moving back to Japan from Germany. Winning this popular competition resulted her to join the cast of the prime-time television comedy Born to be Wild! as a series regular.

Tamura's first starring role was in the award-winning NHK mini-series, My Beloved Ultra Seven. Tamura was then cast in the highly regarded Taiga Drama television series Hideyoshi, in which she portrayed real-life historical figure, Hosokawa Gracia.

In 2007, Tamura filed a lawsuit against IMDb for invading her privacy by posting her birthday and full name online. The complaint was settled privately.

Her first autobiography, Hollywood Dream (ハリウッド ドリーム, Hariuddo Dorīmu), was published in Japan by Bungeishunjū in 2009.

== Discography ==
=== Studio albums ===
- May Be Dream (July 19, 1989)
- Myself (February 28, 1990)
- Behind the Heart (September 5, 1990)
- Der Traum (February 14, 1991)
- Taiyō no Vacance (June 28, 1991)
- Shōjo de Iraretara (June 24, 1992)
- Ima no Watashi de... (December 2, 1992)
- Sure (September 22, 1993)

=== Compilations ===
- Discovery (December 4, 1991)
- Ballad (August 24, 1994)
- Twin Best: Eriko Tamura (March 28, 1998)
- Golden Best: Eriko Tamura (June 25, 2003)
- New Best 1500 (August 24, 2005)

== See also ==
- Japanese community of Düsseldorf
