= Heroes (American TV series) =

American television series (2006–2010)

- Genre: Superhero; Drama
- Created by: Tim Kring
- Starring: Santiago Cabrera; Jack Coleman; Tawny Cypress; Noah Gray-Cabey; Greg Grunberg; Ali Larter; Masi Oka; Hayden Panettiere; Adrian Pasdar; Sendhil Ramamurthy; Leonard Roberts; Milo Ventimiglia; David Anders; Kristen Bell; Dana Davis; James Kyson Lee; Zachary Quinto; Dania Ramirez; Cristine Rose; Robert Knepper
- Composers: Wendy Melvoin; Lisa Coleman
- Country of origin: United States
- Original language: English
- No. of seasons: 4
- No. of episodes: 78 (list of episodes)

Production
- Executive producers: Tim Kring; Dennis Hammer; Allan Arkush; Greg Beeman; Matt Shakman; Peter Elkoff; James Middleton
- Producers: Lori Moyter; Kevin Lafferty
- Production locations: Los Angeles, California; Ontario, Canada
- Cinematography: Nate Goodman; Charlie Lieberman; Edward J. Pei; Annette Haellmigk; Alan Caso
- Editors: Lori Motyer; Mike Ketelsen; Michael S. Murphy; Donn Aron; Scott Boyd; Kristopher Lease; Louis Cioffi; Martin Nicholson; Tom Costantino
- Camera setup: Single-camera
- Running time: 42 minutes
- Production companies: Tailwind Productions; NBC Universal Television Studio (2006–07); Universal Media Studios (2007–10)

Original release
- Network: NBC
- Release: September 25, 2006 – February 8, 2010

Related
- Heroes Reborn

Heroes is an American superhero drama television series created by Tim Kring that aired on NBC for four seasons from September 25, 2006, to February 8, 2010. The series tells the stories of ordinary people who discover that they have superhuman abilities and how these abilities take effect in the characters' lives as they work together to prevent catastrophic futures. The series emulates the aesthetic style and storytelling of American comic books, using multi-episode story arcs that build upon a larger, more encompassing narrative. It was produced by Tailwind Productions in association with Universal Media Studios. It was filmed primarily in Los Angeles, California.

Four complete seasons aired with the final episode ending on February 8, 2010. The critically acclaimed first season had a run of 23 episodes and garnered an average of 14.3 million viewers in the United States, receiving the highest rating for an NBC drama premiere in five years. The second season of Heroes attracted an average of 13.1 million viewers in the U.S. and marked NBC's sole series among the top 20 ranked programs in total viewership for the 2007–2008 season. Heroes earned a number of awards and nominations, including Primetime Emmy Awards, Golden Globes, People's Choice Awards, and British Academy Television Awards. Heroes has been cited as one of the greatest television series of all time.

An online extension of the series, Heroes 360 Experience (later rebranded as Heroes Evolutions), was created to explore the Heroes universe and provides insight into the show's mythology. Other official Heroes media include magazines, action figures, tie-in and interactive websites, a mobile game, a novel, clothing and other merchandise. In the fall of 2008, NBC Digital Entertainment released a series of online content for the summer, including more original web content, wireless iTV interactivity, graphic novels available for mobile viewing and webisodes.

A 13-episode follow-up miniseries, Heroes Reborn, premiered on NBC on September 24, 2015.

Deadline reported in April 2024 that a new series is in development, reportedly titled Heroes: Eclipsed. In July 2026, it was announced that all four seasons were being reintroduced to Netflix after an absence of a decade.

== Cast and characters ==
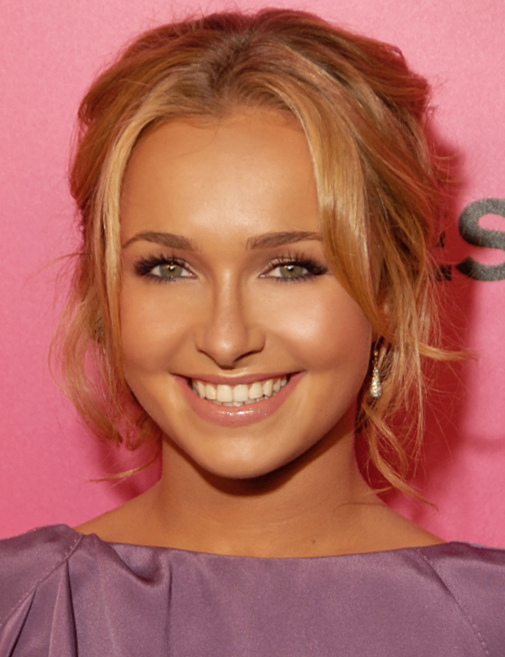
Hayden Panettiere, who played Claire Bennet

Kring designed the series to have an ever-shifting cast. This motivation changed when he realized how popular the original cast was with audiences; he brought back most of the first-season cast for the second season, with a few additions who received star billing. In its first season, the show features an ensemble cast of twelve main characters, making it the third largest cast in American primetime television behind Desperate Housewives and Lost. Although NBC's first-season cast page listed only ten characters, Leonard Roberts, who first appeared in the series' fifth episode as D L Hawkins, was an additional member of the original full-time cast. In the first-season episode "Fallout," Jack Coleman, who portrays Noah Bennet, was upgraded from a recurring role to become the twelfth full-time cast member.

The following remained major characters during all four seasons:

- Milo Ventimiglia as Peter Petrelli, a hospice nurse with the ability to mimic abilities of other people
- Hayden Panettiere as Claire Bennet, a high-school cheerleader who can spontaneously regenerate
- Masi Oka as Hiro Nakamura, an office worker who can manipulate space-time
- Adrian Pasdar as Nathan Petrelli, a congressional candidate with the ability to fly
- Greg Grunberg as Matt Parkman, an LAPD police officer who can read people's minds
- Although Niki Sanders, played by Ali Larter, was written out in the third season, Larter remained on the show throughout all four seasons, playing Sanders' sister, Tracy Strauss, for the final season.

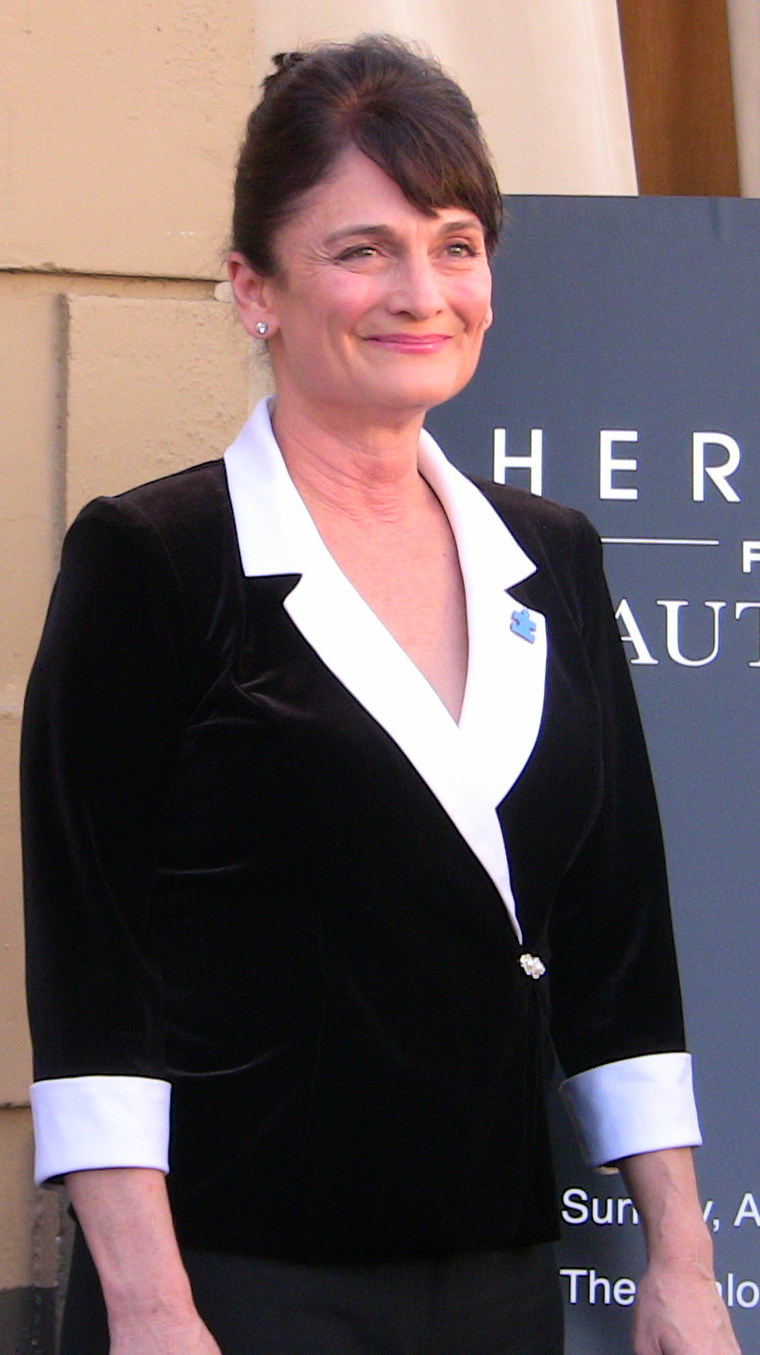
Cristine Rose joined the main cast in season three.

Starting in season three, recurring character Angela Petrelli, portrayed by Cristine Rose, was promoted to a main character. Elle, Adam, and Micah were removed from the main cast. Monica Dawson did not appear after scenes including her were cut. Niki was also written out but actress Ali Larter remained on the show portraying a new character Tracy Strauss, Niki's triplet sister with the power to freeze objects with a touch. For season four, a new character Samuel Sullivan, portrayed by Robert Knepper, was added. Cast as a recurring part, the part was changed to a starring role.

== Episodes ==
Season	Volume	Episodes		Originally released	
Season	Volume	Episodes		First released	Last released
1	Genesis	23		September 25, 2006	May 21, 2007
2	Generations	11		September 24, 2007	December 3, 2007
3	Villains	25	13	September 22, 2008	December 15, 2008
3	Fugitives	25	12	February 2, 2009	April 27, 2009
4	Redemption	19		September 21, 2009	February 8, 2010

=== Synopsis ===
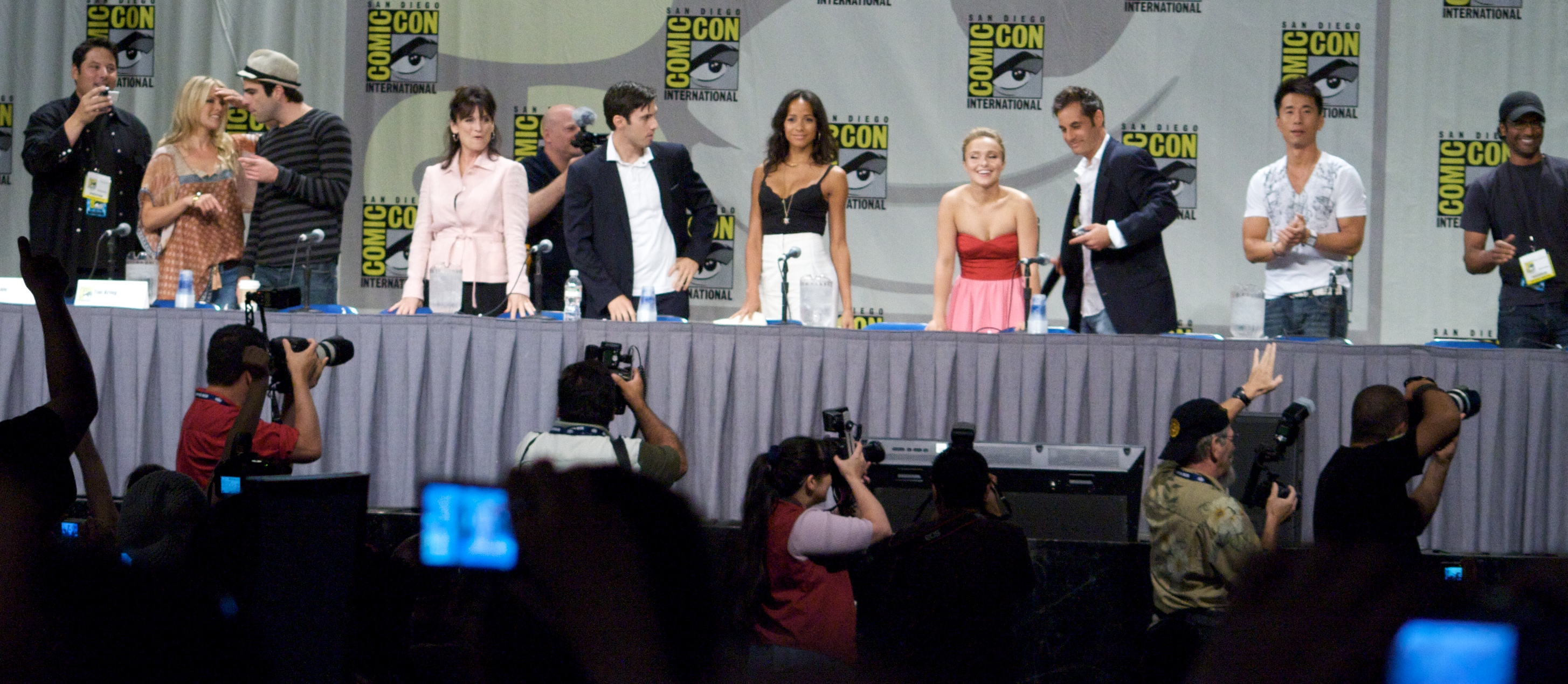
Cast of Heroes at San Diego Comic-Con 2008

The plot of Heroes is designed to be told in a way similar to the comic books stories. Each season of Heroes contains one or two "volumes." There are several main story lines in each volume. As the main plots develop, smaller, more intimate stories are told within them. Each main character's story is developed separately and as time passes their paths cross and it is explained how their stories are intertwined and connected. This is the story of ordinary people who discover extraordinary super powers after a solar eclipse reveals them, and how these abilities affect the characters' daily lives.

The first season, known as "Volume One: Genesis," begins with a seemingly ordinary group of people who gradually become aware that they have special abilities. The story develops showing their reactions to those powers, and how that discovery affects their personal and professional lives. At the same time, several ordinary individuals are investigating the origins and extent of those abilities. Mohinder Suresh (Sendhil Ramamurthy), a research geneticist, continues his late father's research into the biological source of the powers, while Noah Bennet (Jack Coleman) represents, and is a lead agent for, a secret organization known only as "the Company" that wants to control, and if necessary, terminate those who are gifted. After only having a short time to come to terms with their new abilities, each of the heroes is drawn into the final showdown. They must each do their part to stop the destruction of the world that starts with an impending explosion at Kirby Plaza in New York City.

Season two, known as "Volume Two: Generations," begins four months after the events at Kirby Plaza. The main plot of Generations deals with the Company and its research on the Shanti virus. In a flashback to 1977, the research is performed by the Company's founders, whose identities are eventually revealed, to discover what the effects of various strains of the virus will do to the human and superhuman population. The virus is weaponized and locked away at Primatech Paper, the Company's facility used as a front. Returning to the present, the heroes must come together in an attempt to stop the release of a deadly strain of the virus and avert a global pandemic.

The first part of season three is called "Volume Three: Villains." Volume three begins with an assassination attempt on Nathan Petrelli (Adrian Pasdar), a political figure who can fly, and explores its consequences. Meanwhile, several villains escape from the confines of Level 5, a maximum security area owned and operated by the Company within Primatech, and Noah Bennet attempts to recapture them. Arthur Petrelli (Robert Forster), Nathan's father, heals from systemic nerve damage and aims to create a formula to give ordinary people superhuman abilities, simultaneously stealing Peter's powers. The second part of season three, "Volume Four: Fugitives," reveals what happens after Nathan fails to produce the formula. After the destruction of Primatech and Pinehearst, the rival company of Primatech, the heroes attempt to lead normal lives until Nathan initiates his plan to round up all people with abilities. He is opposed in that plan by the other heroes, led by Peter, who used the synthetic formula to acquire a new ability where he can only copy one power at a time as opposed to his previous array of abilities. Sylar kills Nathan in an intense duel. However, because Nathan is a prominent political player, Matt Parkman (Greg Grunberg), who has power over people's minds, is instructed to alter Sylar's mind so that he will believe that he is Nathan and take his place, utilising Sylar's new powers of shapeshifting and psychometry to take on Nathan's appearance while his psychometry would 'fill in the blanks' on other details. This has a negative side effect causing Sylar's consciousness to become trapped in Matt Parkman's mind.

Season four contains "Volume Five: Redemption," and takes place six weeks after the events of season three. The heroes try to return to their normal lives; Peter returns to his job as a paramedic, while Claire attends college. Sylar's body is causing his previously acquired abilities to manifest as he struggles with his forced identity as Nathan. Sylar's actual consciousness, trapped in Matt Parkman's mind, taunts Matt and seeks out his own body. Meanwhile, Hiro has to deal with a brain tumor that is slowly killing him and preventing him from controlling his powers. A carnival group is introduced whose leader, Samuel, tries to recruit more people with abilities into his carnival family. Samuel claims he is creating a community for special people where they are welcome to be open with their abilities and respected by outsiders. In truth, he is bringing together as many people with abilities as possible to build up his own power, moving earth. The more special people he has around him, the stronger his power. The heroes have to come together to battle Samuel and his plan to expose "specials" to the world by killing thousands of people. The series finale ends by opening the nonexistent "Volume Six: Brave New World" in which Claire reveals the existence of people with special abilities to a group of reporters and photographers. The series mimics how it started, with the last scene involving Claire Bennet jumping from a ferris wheel and stating, "My name is Claire Bennet, and that was attempt number—I guess I've kind of lost count."

== Production ==
=== Conception ===
Heroes began development early in 2006, when Tim Kring, creator of NBC's Crossing Jordan, came up with the show's concept. Kring wanted to create a "large ensemble saga" that would connect with the audience. He began thinking about how big, scary and complicated he felt the world is, and wanted to create a character-driven series about people who could do something about it. Kring felt that a cop or medical drama did not have characters that were big enough to save the world. He came up with the thought of superheroes; ordinary people who would discover extraordinary abilities, while still rooted in the real world and in reality. Each episode of the series cost $4 million to produce.

Casting directors Jason La Padura and Natalie Hart brought forth a cast of new faces such as Milo Ventimiglia, who described the TV pilot as a "character drama about everyday people with a heightened reality." Said heightened reality was brought to light through the work of production designer Ruth Ammon. Kring wanted the series to have touchstones that involved the characters and the world they lived in.

Before he began putting his ideas together, he spoke with Lost executive producer Damon Lindelof, with whom he had worked for three years on Crossing Jordan. Kring credits Lindelof for giving him ideas on how to pitch the series to the network and advice on the lessons he (Lindelof) learned about working on a serialized drama. The two still speak and support each other's projects. When Kring pitched the idea for Heroes to the NBC network, he described the network's reaction as "excited...very supportive." He comments that he has been partners with NBC for some time based on his six-year run as showrunner for Crossing Jordan. When he pitched the pilot, he described every detail, including the cliffhanger ending. When NBC executives asked him what was going to happen next, Kring responded, "Well, you'll just have to wait and find out." After the project was greenlit, a special 73-minute version of the pilot was first screened to a large audience at the 2006 San Diego Comic-Con. It was initially reported that this unaired pilot would not be released, but it was included on the season one DVD set.

=== Writing ===
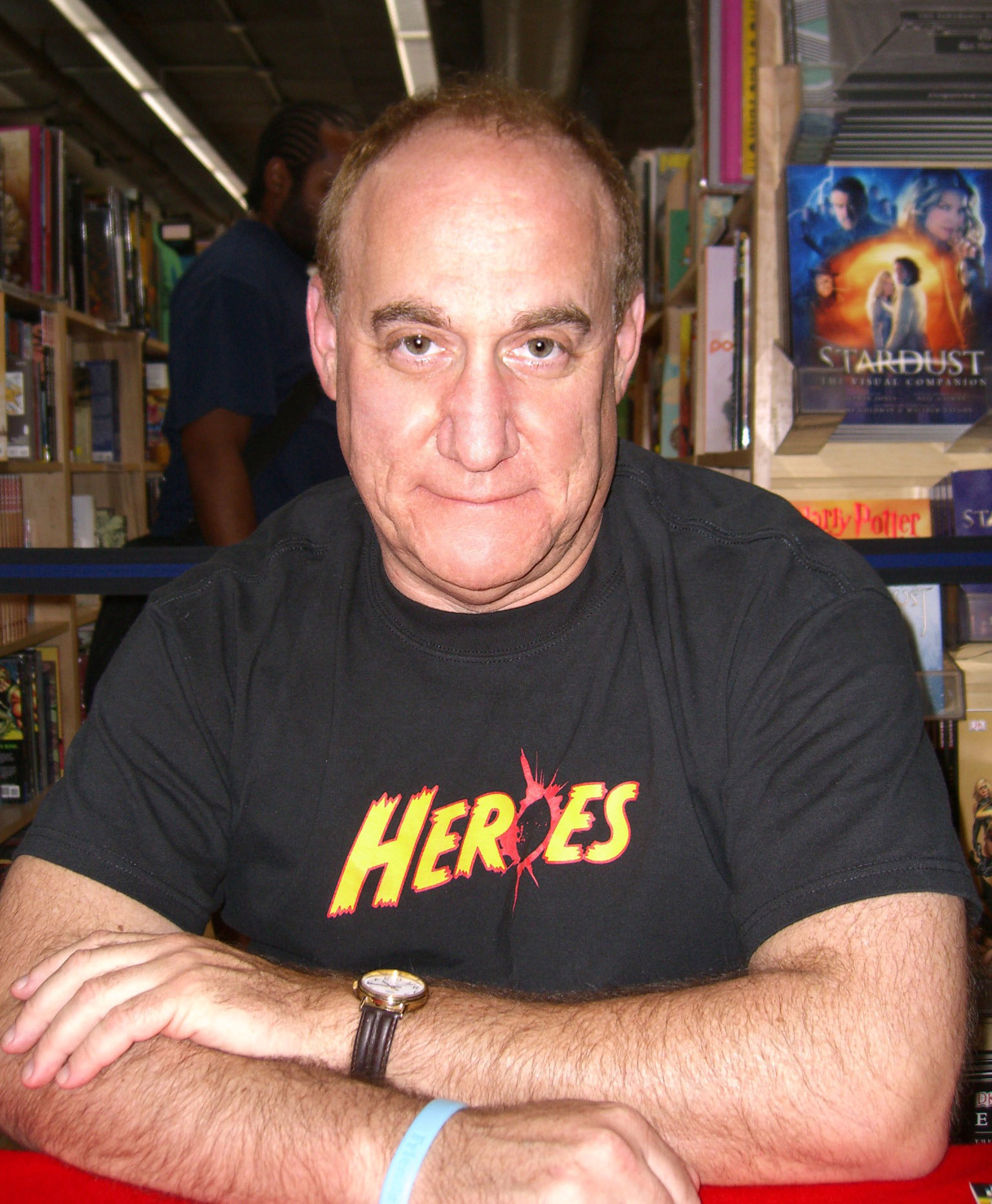
Comic writer Jeph Loeb helped define the tone of the series.

When the writing team worked on an episode, each writer took a character and wrote the individual scenes surrounding them. These stories were then combined and given to the episode writer. This system allowed every writer to contribute to every episode, and enabled the writing team to finish scripts sooner, so the filming crew could shoot more scenes at a location. Kring described the writing process as a collaborative one and stated that the collaboration process was important because production needed to shoot several scenes at a single location. To do this, several scripts had to be ready. Jesse Alexander, co-producer and writer, explained that this process was important in a serialized drama because one has to know where each character's development is heading.

Season two coincided with the WGA writers' strike, meaning only 11 out of the planned 24 episodes were produced. That forced the producers to redesign the season to encompass only the Generations volume out of the three planned. The planned third volume, Exodus, which was designed to be a story arc reflecting the effects of the release of strain 138 of the Shanti virus, was cancelled. The planned fourth volume, Villains, was changed to the third volume and moved into season three. Scenes from the volume two finale, "Powerless," were reshot to reflect the cancelation of the Exodus volume, and to tie up all the loose plot storylines of Generations.

Following criticisms of the second and third volumes, Tim Molloy from TV Guide reported that Heroes would return to its roots with the fourth volume, Fugitives, to attract new viewers and regain those who gave up on the show because of too many characters and plotlines. In November 2008, NBC fired Jesse Alexander and Jeph Loeb from the production staff of Heroes over creative differences and budget problems. As a result, Kring would refocus the series on character development and simple storytelling. However, a high-ranking insider told TV Guide that rather than pressure from NBC or Universal Media responding to recent plummeting ratings, it was Kring himself who fired Alexander and Loeb, because the duo refused to continue character-driven stories that made the first season popular from the start. In December 2008, Bryan Fuller signed a two-year deal with Universal Media Studios after the cancellation of his ABC series Pushing Daisies. He rejoined the writing staff of Heroes starting with the 20th episode of season three and had a "key role in the writing and direction" of the series. On June 22 it was revealed that Fuller left Heroes to work on other projects. On April 28, 2009, director/producer Greg Beeman was fired by NBC.

=== Music ===
The series score is composed by Wendy Melvoin and Lisa Coleman, with music engineer Michael Perfitt and vocals provided by Shankar. Each episode averages 30–35 minutes of music. Melvoin and Coleman became involved with Heroes from their previous work with executive producer Allan Arkush. Kring gave general instructions to the pair, including the emotion and direction for each character. Kring wanted incredibly unusual music and gave Melvoin and Coleman a lot of freedom and permission to experiment. In the pilot episode, Kring suggested that a "dreamy" cue be used in the scene involving Claire Bennet running into a burning train. The "dreamy" cue became a signature piece of the show. Melvoin and Coleman developed musical cues for each character. Claude's theme involved wind and voices to create the feeling of a ghost-like presence. Sylar's involves marimbas and bassoons with staccato to re-create the sound of clocks ticking in reference to the character's power. Matt Parkman's theme involves voices being played backwards when he uses his power of telepathy. Peter Petrelli's theme involves marcato strings. Niki Sanders's theme was based on her character's alter-ego Jessica and involved winds and Indian voices chanting in an underscore to give a feeling that she was possessed. Mohinder Suresh's theme is the piano composition that plays at the end of some episodes.

In 2007, the ASCAP Film and Television Music Awards gave Melvoin and Coleman the Top Television Series award for their work on Heroes. In France, the theme music of Heroes is composed by Victoria Petrosillo. Her song, "Le Héros d'un autre," is used by television network TF1 to replace the show's original incidental music. The network created a new opening credit sequence so they could play Petrosillo's theme. The official Heroes soundtrack was released on March 18, 2008, by The NBCUniversal Television, DVD, Music & Consumer Products Group. On February 29, 2008, the Group released five music videos created by Heroes producer/director Allan Arkush, each combining show footage with songs from the soundtrack. In September 2008, Melvoin and Coleman announced that they would be releasing Heroes: Original Score, an album consisting entirely of the score from Heroes. It was released on April 14, 2009, by La-La Land Records.

=== Filming and visual effects ===
Eric Grenaudier and John Han of Stargate Digital are the visual effects supervisors and Mark Spatny is the visual effects producer for Heroes. They work with visual effects animators Anthony Ocampo and Ryan Wieber, who are also from Stargate. The series visual effects consist of blue screens and 2D and 3D animation. The visual effects for the series are created after the scene is shot in post-production, unlike special effects, which are incorporated into the scenes during filming. Notable visual effects include radioactive Ted in "Company Man," Nathan flying from Mr. Bennet and The Haitian in "Hiros," and Hiro's time freezing encounter with the schoolgirl in the red bow in "One Giant Leap." The special effects were coordinated by Gary D'Amico. Stunts were coordinated by Ian Ouinn, who also used blue screens to accomplish some of the stunts in the series, such as Nathan Petrelli flying away from Heidi during the car accident scene in "Six Months Ago." Principal filming for Heroes occurred in Los Angeles and Santa Clarita, California. The Stargate Digital team were responsible for making Los Angeles look like international locations, such as India and Ukraine, using blue screens and set designs by Ruth Ammon, production designer for the series. The series was recorded using a single-camera setup.

In keeping with the comic book thematic elements used on Heroes, professional comic book artists Tim Sale and Alex Maleev were brought in to provide the artwork used within the series under the direction of Ruth Ammon, including the artwork of Isaac Mendez, and Mendez's metafictional comic book series, 9th Wonders!. Additionally, the font used in captions and credits for the show is reminiscent of traditional hand-rendered comic book lettering. It was created by Sale and is based on his handwriting style. Heroes was designed by production designer Ruth Ammon. Ammon was nominated for her work on Heroes twice by the Art Directors Guild and nominated for two Emmy Awards for excellence in art direction.

=== Heroes: Origins ===
On May 14, 2007, NBC announced that it would air a six-episode Heroes spin-off, Heroes: Origins, during the 2007–08 season. The show was to introduce a new character each week, and viewers were to select which one would stay for the following season of the regular series. The show was supposed to air after the completion of the second season of Heroes in April 2008; however, on October 31, 2007, it was reported that Origins had been postponed because of the Writers Guild of America strike. Kring stated in an interview that the first episode of Origins was to reveal the secrets and meanings behind the Helix symbol. Because of the WGA Strike, Kring commented that the secret will have to be revealed down the line. Kring revealed that he was to write the first episode of Origins, and that John August had been hired to write another episode. Director Kevin Smith, a fan of Heroes, was set to write and direct an episode for the spin-off, as were Eli Roth and Michael Dougherty. On April 3, 2008, a day after NBC announced its 2008–2009 primetime schedule, Ben Silverman confirmed Origins's cancellation.

== Mythology ==
Heroes includes some mysterious fictional recurring elements that have been ascribed to science fiction or supernatural phenomena. Kring and the creators of the series referred to these fictional elements as part of the mythology of the series. Kring confirmed that although the show has a unique mythology, he did not want to sink too deeply into it. Rather, Kring used volumes to wrap up ongoing plot lines instead of carrying storylines over long periods of time as in Lost. Among the show's mythological elements are the Company, the legend of Takezo Kensei, paintings of the future, superpowers and their origins, the Shanti virus, 9th Wonders! comic book, and numerous other elements and mythological themes.

== Response ==
=== Critical reception ===
Season one received highly positive reviews. During the season, the American Film Institute named Heroes one of the ten "best television programs of the year." Doug Elfman of the Chicago Sun-Times stated, "the show's super strengths are its well-developed filmmaking, smooth pacing and a perfect cast. It views like the first hour of a fun, thoughtful movie." Barry Garron at The Hollywood Reporter also stated, "Heroes is one of TV's most imaginative creations and might, with luck, become this year's Lost." Less favorable reviews included The Philadelphia Inquirer, who commented that although the show had lots of "cool effects," it "lands, splat, in a pile of nonsense and dim dialogue." In response to the first pod of season one episodes, The Chicago Tribune went as far as saying, "you could watch the first few episodes of Heroes, or you could repeatedly hit yourself on the head with a brick. The effect is surprisingly similar." At Metacritic, the Heroes pilot received a 67/100, with generally favorable reviews from critics. The show was declared the fourth highest rated show for the first ten years of IMDbPro (2002–2012).

Season two received generally positive reviews, but was criticized by commentators and fans for a much slower pace, less engaging storyline and lack of focus compared to the first season. Milo Ventimiglia stated that "when there's a little bit of a delay, there's not that instant, rewarding scene or moment or episode... people get impatient, so it has been extremely important for them to strike a balance between giving and getting." In an interview with Entertainment Weekly, Heroes creator Tim Kring commented on criticisms of season two, and the series' 15% decline in ratings. Kring said that he felt he had made mistakes with the direction of season two. He had thought that the audience was looking for a "build-up of characters and the discovery of their powers," when viewers were instead looking for "adrenaline." Kring also outlined what he felt were problems with plot development, stating that season two "took too long to get to the big-picture story," explaining that Peter's vision of the viral armageddon should have occurred in the first episode instead of the seventh. He feels that it would have been better to introduce new characters within the context of the main storyline, as with Elle, rather than in unattached arcs such as that of Maya and Alejandro. Kring also admitted that he should have resolved the "Hiro in Japan" storyline much more quickly, and that the romantic stories were not working well. With regard to Claire and West, and Hiro and Yaeko, he said, "I've seen more convincing romances on TV. In retrospect, I don't think romance is a natural fit for us."

For season 3, Los Angeles Times said "Even just a half-hour in, it's difficult not to wish everyone would just lighten the heck up. The graphic novel noir feel is becoming increasingly oppressive, and everyone is just so grim." New York Post wrote "This show, which was once so thrilling and fun, has become full of itself, its characters spouting crazy nonsense."

=== Awards and nominations ===
By the time Heroes completed the first half of the first season, the show had already collected an assortment of honors and accolades. On December 13, 2006, the Writers Guild of America nominated the program for "best new series" of 2007. On December 14, the Hollywood Foreign Press Association nominated the program for a Golden Globe Award for Best Television Drama, and nominated Masi Oka (Hiro Nakamura) for Best Supporting Actor on a TV Series. On January 9, 2007, Heroes won the award for Favorite New TV Drama at the 33rd People's Choice Awards. The National Association for the Advancement of Colored People nominated Heroes on January 9, 2007, for an Image Award in the "Outstanding Drama Series" category. On February 21, 2007, Heroes was nominated for five Saturn Awards. The nominations included "Best Network Television Series," "Best Supporting Actor in a Television Series" for both Greg Grunberg and Masi Oka, and "Best Supporting Actress in a Television Series" for Hayden Panettiere and Ali Larter. On February 22, 2008, it was announced that Heroes was again nominated for five Saturn Awards. The nominations for 2008 include "Best Network Television Series," "Best Supporting Actor in a Television Series" for both Greg Grunberg and Masi Oka, "Best Supporting Actress in a Television Series" for Hayden Panettiere, and "Best Television Series on DVD." The 2008 nominations are similar to the 2007 nominations, except Ali Larter was not nominated this year; instead the Heroes Season one DVD was nominated, in a different category.

On July 19, 2007, the Academy of Television Arts & Sciences announced their nominations for the 2007 Primetime Emmy Awards. Heroes was nominated in eight categories, including Outstanding Drama Series. The first episode, "Genesis," earned six nominations: Outstanding Directing for a Drama Seriesg (David Semel), Outstanding Art Direction for a Single-Camera Series, Outstanding Single-Camera Picture Editing for a Drama Series, Outstanding Sound Mixing for a Comedy or Drama Series, and Outstanding Stunt Coordination. The episode "Five Years Gone" also received a nomination for Outstanding Visual Effects for a Series. Masi Oka was nominated for Outstanding Supporting Actor in a Drama Series. On September 16, 2007, the 59th Primetime Emmy Awards were held and Heroes failed to win a single Emmy award despite the eight nominations. On July 21, 2007, the Television Critics Association awarded Heroes with the prestigious Outstanding Program of the Year title during their 23rd Annual TCA Awards ceremony. The cast of Heroes was named in the 2006 Time magazine's Person of the Year issue under "People Who Mattered."

=== Ratings ===
U.S. viewers for each episode in the series, broken down by volume. Volumes correspond to seasons except for two-volume season 3.

The pilot episode generated 14.3 million viewers, with the season high topping out at 16.03 million viewers for episode 9. When the series returned from hiatus on January 22, 2007, the ratings averaged about the same as the pilot with 14.9 million viewers. When the show went on a second hiatus during the first season, from March 4, 2007, to April 23, 2007 (7 weeks), ratings hit a new low; the lowest being 11.14 million viewers during part one of the three part finale, "The Hard Part." In season two, the opener gained the highest rating of the entire series, however, week-by-week, the ratings declined, reaching another new low for the series on episode seven, "Out of Time," with only 9.87 million viewers. Although the ratings were lower than average, this episode was considered to be a turning point for the declining season, as a major plot twist was introduced and the volume's "big picture storyline" was presented. The season two/volume 2 finale generated 11.06 million viewers in the ratings, down more than 3 million viewers from the season opener and series pilot.

While the show premiered with high ratings, ratings slowly diminished throughout its run. The first episode of season two was the highest viewed, whereas each successive season had fewer viewers than the one preceding it.

Season three of Heroes started with strong ratings that dropped steadily throughout the season. The season's finale placed last in its timeslot.

The season four premiere of Heroes was the lowest rated episode of the series to that point, averaging 5.9 million viewers. Despite the season's low ratings, executive producer Tim Kring was "fully expecting" a fifth season. However, while creator Kring was hopeful over the show's future, many media insiders were not so confident. There was growing speculation on some news sites that NBC would cancel the series at the conclusion of its fourth season or that it might renew the show for a fifth and final season by ordering either 6 or 13 episodes and possibly airing them as a backup or mid-season replacement. On May 14, 2010, NBC made it official that Heroes was indeed cancelled.

Season	Timeslot (EDT)	Season premiere	Season finale	TV season	U.S. viewers in millions	U.S. live viewers + DVR	UK viewership (BBC2)
1	Monday 9:00 pm	September 25, 2006	May 21, 2007	2006–2007	13.86	14.30	3.91
2	Monday 9:00 pm	September 24, 2007	December 3, 2007	2007–2008	11.46	13.10	3.81
3	Monday 10:00 pm	September 22, 2008	April 27, 2009	2008–2009	7.61	9.27	3.26
4	Monday 8:00 pm (2009); Monday 9:00 pm (2010)	September 21, 2009	February 8, 2010	2009–2010	6.54	N/A	N/A

=== Promotions and fandom ===
Meet and greet event for Heroes World Tour, Singapore Changi Airport, Singapore

Following the debut of Heroes in 2006, the tagline Save the Cheerleader, Save the World was recognized within the television industry as an effective marketing device. In 2006, NBC also created a Heroes parody titled Zeroes. Zeroes, which was released as a viral video on sites including YouTube, features parodies including four chapters and an open audition. Development and production of the project was kept secret from Kring. NBC hosted panels at the 2006, 2007, 2008, and 2009 San Diego Comic-Con to promote the series. Major announcements have been made during the panel, along with sneak peeks of forthcoming seasons. In 2006, the Heroes panel presented the entire season one 72-minute pilot. In 2008 the first half of the season three premiere was shown. Comic-Con also allows the cast and crew to answer questions from the press and from fans. On July 21, 2007, Kring announced that cast and crew members of Heroes would travel the world for the Heroes World Tour to promote the season one DVD release and the forthcoming season two. The tour took place in North America (New York and Toronto), Asia (Singapore, Tokyo, and Hong Kong) and Europe (Munich, Paris and London). The tour began on August 26, and ended on September 1, 2007. The post-hardcore bands Alesana and I See Stars have both respectively named songs after the show, "This Is Usually the Part Where People Scream" and "Save the Cheerleader."

== Distribution ==
=== Home media ===
The first DVD release of Heroes was a sampler disc, containing only the first episode, and was released in Ireland and the UK on September 3, 2007. UK Region 2 split Heroes into two-halves on its initial release; part one being released on October 1, 2007, and part two on December 10, 2007. When the second part was released, a complete first season boxset was also released on the same day on both DVD and HD DVD formats The complete first season DVD includes nearly 3 hours of bonus features including: an extended 73-minute version of the pilot episode with audio commentary; 50 deleted and extended scenes; behind the scenes featurettes, including the making of Heroes, stunts, a profile of artist Tim Sale, and the score; and audio commentaries with cast, crew and Kring. On February 22, 2008, the Heroes Season One DVD was nominated for a 2008 Saturn Award, in the category of "Best Television Series on DVD." The complete first season was released in USA and Canada on August 28, 2007. It was released in Australia and New Zealand on September 17, 2007.

Universal Studios Home Entertainment and Sony Pictures Home Entertainment has announced that the first and second seasons would be released on Blu-ray on August 26, 2008, the same date as the DVD release of the second season. Specifications and bonus features include: Generations Alternate Ending; Inside the Alternate Ending: What if Peter didn't catch the virus?; untold stories that didn't make it on air; Season three sneak peek; deleted scenes; a documentary on Takezo Kensei; behind the scenes featurettes; NBC.com featurettes; and audio commentaries with cast, crew and show creator Tim Kring. The complete second season was released on July 28, 2008, in the UK. Season 2 was released on October 1, 2008, in New Zealand and Australia.

The Season 3 DVD Box set was released in North America on September 1, 2009, and in Australia on September 2, 2009, with an alternative cover, and in the UK on October 12, 2009.

The Season 4 DVD Box set was released on August 3, 2010, in the US and on October 4, 2010, in the UK.

The Complete Series DVD Box set was released on November 16, 2010, in the US.

=== International ===
In Canada, Heroes episodes run concurrently with the NBC first-run on the Global Television Network, Mondays at 10 p.m. ET. A Canadian French-dubbed version of season one also airs on TVA, Thursdays at 9:00 p.m. and two episodes of season two on Mystère (addikTV), Mondays at 8:00 p.m.

The first season aired in Australia on the Seven Network Wednesday nights at 8:30 p.m. The series debuted strongly, attracting more than 2 million viewers in five of the capital cities. To keep viewer numbers high the Seven Network began showing the second season on Thursday nights at 9:30 p.m. across all areas, a week after the US screening. The third season began airing on October 9, 2008, and Volume 4 began airing on April 23, 2009. Because of low ratings, it was pushed back half-an-hour to 11:00 p.m. after Scrubs and the season concluded July 9, 2009. The Sci-Fi (available through Foxtel, Optus TV and Austar) screened season two re-runs in late 2009. From June 2010, season three is screening on the Sci-Fi Channel in Australia. Season four aired, approximately one month behind the US, on Seven's new digital channel 7Two, on November 4, 2009, at the new time of Wednesdays 8:30 p.m. It started with the double premiere and had double episode runs instead of one episode a week, until it caught up to the US, after that it began to air episodes once a week at 8:30 p.m. It currently airs on Thursdays 9:30 p.m. on 7Two.

In the United Kingdom, the series first aired on February 19, 2007, on digital channel Sci Fi UK. The series averaged 450,000 viewers, which is almost four times more viewers than those of other programs on Sci Fi UK. The series was then picked up by the BBC, which gave season one its terrestrial premiere from July 25 to December 5, 2007, on BBC Two. Season two of Heroes first aired from April 24 to July 3, 2008, on BBC Two, attracting around 3.7 million viewers. Season three began on October 1, 2008, and gained 3.81 million viewers. Season four began on January 9, 2010, but viewership as of February 8 had declined to just 0.74 million.

In Indonesia, Season 1 aired on Trans TV on weeknights starting from January 31, 2007, at 6:00 p.m. WIB. All subsequent seasons aired on Trans7 on Wednesdays starting from August 6, 2007, at 8:00 p.m. WIB.

=== Merchandise ===
Ubisoft announced that they had licensed the rights to produce a Heroes video game; however, the company later chose to give the rights back to NBCUniversal. Gameloft released the first Heroes mobile game on October 5, 2007. It consists of 8 levels and playable characters include Hiro Nakamura, Niki Sanders and Peter Petrelli.

Each week, NBC released a Heroes webcomic. The comics gave additional character background and plot information not shown in the television episodes. The graphic novels continued on a weekly basis during the show's 2007 summer hiatus. Wildstorm, a subsidiary of DC Comics, released them in published form on November 7, 2007. The first collected volume included novels 1–34, and featured two different covers by Alex Ross and Jim Lee as well as an introduction by Masi Oka and artwork by Tim Sale. The second volume included 35–80. It has an advertisement for a third volume, that would at least have 81–103, and more, and it was scheduled for fall 2009. For unknown reasons, the third volume has not been released.

On December 26, 2007, the only Heroes novel was published, titled Saving Charlie. Written by Aury Wallington, who wrote the book with the full cooperation of the Heroes writing staff, the novel revolves around the relationship of Hiro Nakamura and Charlie Andrews, when Hiro went back in time six months to attempt to save her.

Titan Magazines released the first issue of Heroes Magazine on November 20, 2007. It is the first of a series of six, slated to be released bi-monthly. The first issue is a 100-page premiere issue. Feature articles include a cast group interview, a secret origins featurette, and a season one episode guide. Greg Beeman, executive producer of Heroes has confirmed that this is an official Heroes release, with the full support and cooperation of Tim Kring and the rest of the Heroes production team. The magazine ceased publication with the twelfth issue.

Mezco announced at Toy Fair 2007 that they would be producing a line of action figures based on the television show Heroes. The first series, Series I, includes Peter Petrelli, Claire Bennet, Hiro Nakamura, Sylar and Mohinder Suresh. The second series, Series II, includes Niki Sanders/Jessica Sanders, Noah Bennet, Daniel Linderman, Matt Parkman (with Molly Walker) and Claude.

== Multimedia ==
=== Television and radio ===
Heroes Unmasked is a series on BBC that goes behind-the-scenes of the production of Heroes. Many details of Heroes are revealed. Among them are props, set design, blue and green screen animation, and special effects and costuming. The first two series of this show were narrated by Anthony Head, the third by Santiago Cabrera. American network G4 began airing Heroes episodes on November 3, 2007, along with an American version of Heroes Unmasked titled The Post Show. The series, aired following Heroes, included interviews, live viewer commentary, interactive polls, behind-the-scenes footage and other Heroes content. American network MOJO HD also aired Heroes episodes in high definition. However, that network left the air at the start of December 2008, and on the day and date of MOJO's discontinuation G4 launched their HD simulcast feed, thus now carrying the show in both regular and high definition forms.

In November 2007, the BBC made four short '2 Dimensional' films where actors from the series look through a '2' shaped hole into a room that reflects the character they play in Heroes. A new short was revealed just before episode one of season three aired on BBC2, featuring Masi Oka staring into an anime-styled montage of Hiro.

BBC Radio 7 broadcast "Heroes—The Official Radio Show" with Jon Holmes, every Saturday at 7:30 on BBC7 DAB digital radio. The program was also available as a podcast.

=== Internet and digital extensions ===
The Heroes production team also has official series content on the internet. Writers Joe Pokaski and Aron Coleite hold a "Question and Answer" column hosted by Comic Book Resources titled "Behind the Eclipse." Show producer and director Greg Beeman also posts weekly on his blog where he discusses how the episode is filmed and gives spoilers for the upcoming episode.

Heroes Evolutions, released on January 19, 2007, is a digital extension of the series that explores the Heroes universe and provides clues to the show's mythology. It was titled Heroes 360 Experience throughout the first season and rebranded for the second season. Heroes Interactive is an interactive web page that began operation on January 29, 2007, during the airing of "The Fix." Hosted at NBC.com, it offers behind the scenes information, polls, trivia, and quizzes, as well as recent posts by Hana Gitelman. The features air once a week, and are designed to be viewed concurrently with that week's episode.

Complete episodes of Heroes are available online, to US residents only, along with downloads through the "NBC Direct" service. Episodes are also available on iTunes in 720p High Definition, although they were unavailable for a few months when NBC and Apple Inc. were unable to come to a renewal deal. Seasons 1, 2, 3, and 4 are currently available for streaming via subscription on Netflix, Amazon Video, and Hulu Plus.

NBC Universal announced on April 2, 2008, that NBC Digital Entertainment would release a series on online content for the summer and fall of 2008, including more original web content and webisodes. Heroes webisodes are expected to air through an extension of the Heroes Evolutions in July. Other media and digital extensions announced include an online manhunts for the villains, the addition of more micro sites that allow the users to uncover more of the Heroes universe, wireless iTV interactivity and the ability to view the graphic novel on mobile platforms.

Create Your Hero is a fan-based, interactive promotion on NBC.com, which calls upon Heroes fans to vote on various personalities and physical attributes for the creation of a new hero. The new hero "[comes] to life" in an original, live-action series run exclusively on NBC.com. The promotion is sponsored by Sprint. The first hero created by this process, Santiago, has the dual powers of enhanced probability and superhuman speed. He began appearing in the live-action web series, Heroes: Destiny, on November 10, 2008 (sweeps week). On October 18, 2008, Heroes Wiki announced that it had officially partnered with NBC. NBC now directs those interested in a wiki on Heroes to Heroes Wiki, and directly funds the site in exchange for the site running advertisements for the network.

== Legal issues ==
The show has been described as having a very similar setting to Rising Stars, a comic that debuted in 1999, which led to some discussion of whether Heroes was plagiarizing ideas from the Rising Stars. Heroes creator, Tim Kring, addressed this directly when asked about it some time after his show premiered by stating that he has never read Rising Stars, and that he purposefully refused to familiarize himself with a number of superhero-related works to avoid such accusations of improper inspiration.

On March 19, 2007, Clifton Mallery and Amnau Karam Eele filed suit against NBC and Tim Kring claiming that the idea for Isaac Mendez, who can paint the future, was stolen from a short story, painting and short film that they had produced. The suit was dismissed. On December 11, 2007, the New York Law Journal reported on Mallery v. NBC Universal, quoting from Southern District Judge Denise Cote's opinion that "the line between mere 'ideas' and protected 'expression' is 'famously difficult to fix precisely'," and stating that Heroes was not close to infringing.

== See also ==
- 2006 in American television
