= List of Heroes cast members =

This is a list of recurring actors on the American television show Heroes. Every actor credited in two episodes or more is included in the article, which covers episodes 1.01 to 4.18.

== Main cast ==
The main cast of Heroes are credited in alphabetical order in the episodes they appear in only. The season(s) during which each actor is included in the main cast are marked in green below, while the season(s) during which a starring actor appears as a guest star are marked in yellow. Former main cast members are credited as special guest stars in seasons 2 and 3, with the exception of Noah Gray-Cabey in episode 3.03. Season 3, which has 25 episodes, is the only season in which no one appears in every episode; Hayden Panettiere is in every season one episode, both Panettiere (the only cast member to have a perfect attendance record for more than one season) and Robert Knepper appear in every episode of the final season, and Sendhil Ramamurthy takes part in all season two episodes.

| Actor | Character | Appearances | | | | | |
| Actor | Character | S 1 | S 2 | S 3 | S 4 | H R | Overall |
|---|---|---|---|---|---|---|---|
| Jack Coleman (Note: After having been credited as a guest star for the first half of the first season, Jack Coleman was promoted to series regular, starting with episode 1.11.) | Noah Bennet | 22 | 10 | 23 | 17 | 13 | 85 |
| Greg Grunberg | Matt Parkman | 19 | 8 | 21 | 9 | 5 | 62 |
| Masi Oka | Hiro Nakamura | 22 | 9 | 21 | 12 | 3 | 67 |
| Sendhil Ramamurthy (Note: Sendhil Ramamurthy appears only as narrator in episodes 1.07, 2.08, 3.03, 3.19 and 4.12, and only as narrator and in re-used footage in episodes 1.10 and 3.08. He is credited as usual in all these episodes.) | Mohinder Suresh | 21 | 11 | 23 | 7 | 6 | 68 |
| Cristine Rose | Angela Petrelli | 12 | 7 | 23 | 9 | 3 | 54 |
| Hayden Panettiere (Note: Hayden Panettiere also appears in episode 3.08, un-credited, through re-use of footage from 1.01.) | Claire Bennet | 23 | 9 | 22 | 18 | | 72 |
| Ali Larter | Niki Sanders/Tracy Strauss (Note: Ali Larter played Niki Sanders in seasons 1 and 2, beginning with 1.01. From season 3, she appeared as Tracy Strauss, beginning with 3.01 (although Niki's corpse was briefly seen in 3.03.) | 20 | 7 | 17 | 7 | | 51 |
| Adrian Pasdar | Nathan Petrelli | 20 | 7 | 24 | 8 | | 59 |
| Milo Ventimiglia | Peter Petrelli | 20 | 9 | 24 | 15 | | 68 |
| Noah Gray-Cabey | Micah Sanders | 19 | 6 | 3 | | 4 | 32 |
| Leonard Roberts | D.L. Hawkins | 14 | 2 | | | | 16 |
| Santiago Cabrera (Note: Santiago Cabrera receives on-screen credit for episode 4.07, despite only appearing in a re-used scene from episode 1.08.) | Isaac Mendez | 15 | | | 1 | | 16 |
| Tawny Cypress (Note: Tawny Cypress was credited in 13 episodes of the first season, but she only appeared in 12 - although credited in episode 1.05, she didn't appear in it.) | Simone Deveaux | 12 | | | | | 12 |
| James Kyson Lee | Ando Masahashi | 22 | 9 | 21 | 8 | | 60 |
| Zachary Quinto | Gabriel Gray / Sylar | 15 | 5 | 22 | 17 | | 59 |
| David Anders (Note: Although initially hired for a recurring role, David Anders was promoted to series regular prior to the broadcast of season two. He is credited as a guest star in the first three episodes of the season.) | Adam Monroe | | 10 | 4 | 1 | | 15 |
| Kristen Bell | Elle Bishop | | 5 | 7 | 2 | | 14 |
| Dania Ramírez | Maya Herrera | | 8 | 7 | | | 15 |
| Dana Davis | Monica Dawson | | 6 | | | | 6 |
| Robert Knepper (Note: Initially hired for a recurring role, Robert Knepper was promoted to a series regular from episode 4.07.) | Samuel Sullivan | | | | 18 | | 18 |

== Casting ==
Sendhil Ramamurthy's character of Mohinder Suresh was one of only a few characters that was changed based on casting. Suresh was originally designed to be a 55-year-old professor, however, due to Ramamurthy's audition, the part was rewritten and made younger to fit him.

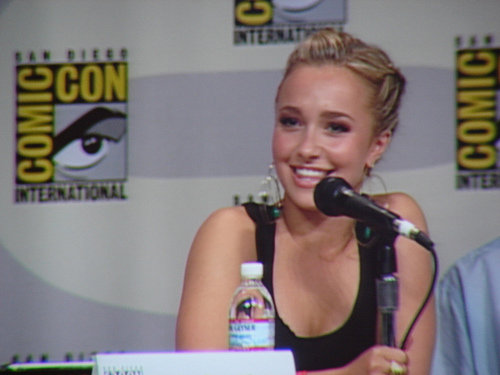
Hayden Panettiere was cast after Marc Hirschfeld said to the producers, "You got to meet Hayden Panettiere."

Hayden Panettiere was cast by Marc Hirschfeld, executive vice president of casting for NBC Universal Television. Hirschfeld explained that when they were trying to decide who the cheerleader should be, he literally picked up the phone and said to the producers, "You got to meet Hayden Panettiere." Dania Ramírez was cast on the series based on her work on The Sopranos. She was notified by Kring that he was creating a Latin character and wanted her to come and test. Ramirez was the only actress called in to test for the role. Kristen Bell was first approached about being cast in July 2007, during a train ride back from San Diego Comic-Con with Heroes actors Zachary Quinto and Masi Oka, and writers from the series. The writers had mentioned that if Bell "ever want[ed] to come on Heroes, give us [writers] a call", to which Bell said she would love to. Bell had several casting options, including ABC's Lost, however it was officially announced that she was cast in August 2007. David Anders auditioned for the role of Takezo Kensei. He read his scenes, impersonating Peter O'Toole, in which the producers responded by asking him to tone down the impression on his second audition. He was contacted two weeks later and given the part. Anders was aware at the time that his role was a recurring role that had the possibility of being promoted to a main cast role, however, he did not find out until the filming of episode five that he would be portraying Monroe, and that his character would be moving into the present.

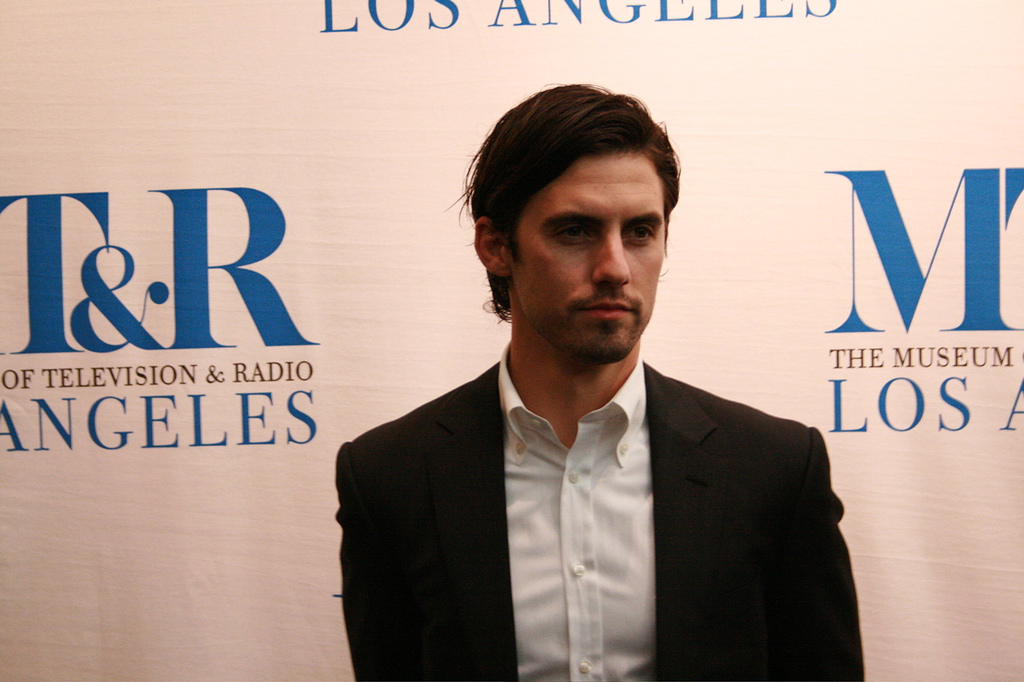
Casting director La Padura stated that the character of Peter Petrelli was the hardest to cast.

La Padura stated that the character of Peter Petrelli was the hardest to cast due to conflicts regarding the Petrelli brother's ages. La Padura states the Petrelli brothers were originally written to be twins, and it became obvious in the production process that in order to have correct dynamic between the two characters, Peter had to be the younger brother. Adrian Pasdar was cast first. Milo Ventimiglia's role as Peter was the last to be cast and the most difficult. Greg Grunberg originally auditioned for the role of one of the Petrelli brothers. It was not a fit for him, but the production liked him so much, they rewrote the role of Matt Parkman to fit him. Originally Parkman's character was to be much younger, and La Padura was looking to cast a Ryan Phillippe-type actor for the role.

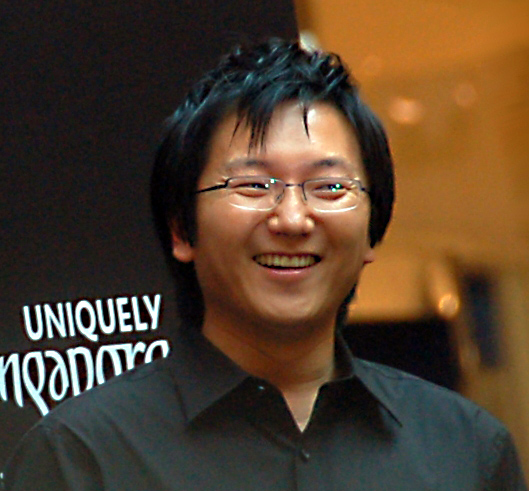
Oka was described as "terrific" and "ideal" for the role of Hiro.

Jack Coleman was originally cast to only be in the pilot, with an open-ended contract. The connection between the characters of Claire and Mr. Bennet, and Kring's approval of Coleman's performance led to him being upgraded to a recurring character, before being promoted to the main cast roster. Dana Davis received the Heroes script during the 2007 pilot season. She auditioned once for the role and was cast.

La Padura also states that Masi Oka was the easiest actor to cast although casting the character was difficult due to a small pool of Japanese-speaking actors. Oka walked in the door and production knew he was "terrific" and "ideal" for the role. Ali Larter was cast for the show after reading several pilots during the 2006 pilot season. She auditioned for the role and was brought in a second and third time to meet with the studio and network respectively before being officially cast. Tawny Cypress also auditioned for the role of Niki, but was not awarded the part. Instead, Kring rewrote the role of Stella for her and renamed the character Simone Deveaux. Zachary Quinto auditioned for the role of Sylar, during the time when the series was currently airing. Tim Kring was not present at his first audition, but after a five-day process, Quinto was awarded the role. Santiago Cabrera was cast through an interview process. When he auditioned for the production team, he went all out, doing the scene from the pilot when Isaac was under the influence of heroin. After the scene, the producers asked, "Well thank you very much for that. Maybe you would try it now not so on the effects of drugs." He eventually landed the role. Leonard Roberts was awarded the role of D.L. Hawkins, after he beat out Jimmy Jean-Louis (The Haitian), who auditioned for the same part three times. The part of the Haitian was rewritten for Jean-Louis. The original concept for the Haitian was to be a character from New Zealand, who would have been called "The Kiwi."

== Guest cast ==
=== A ===
- Dianna Agron - Debbie (5 episodes, season 2)
- Matthew John Armstrong - Ted Sprague (8 episodes, season 1)
- Erick Avari - Chandra Suresh (3 episodes, season 1)

=== B ===
- Link Baker - Broken Nose Guard (3 episodes, season 1)
- Justin Baldoni - Alex Woolsley (2 episodes, season 3)
- Quin & Reed Baron - Matt Parkman, Jr. (seasons 3–4)
- Randall Bentley - Lyle Bennet (20 episodes, season 1–3)
- Nicole Bilderback - Miss Sakamoto (2 episodes, season 1)
- Alan Blumenfeld - Maury Parkman (6 episodes, season 2–3)
- Bruce Boxleitner - Governor Robert Malden (2 episodes, season 3)
- Deanne Bray - Emma Coolidge (9 episodes, season 4)
- Jeanette Brox - Camille (2 episodes, season 2)
- Carlease Burke - Nurse Hammer (3 episodes, season 4)
- Eugene Byrd - Campaign Manager (4 episodes, season 1)

=== C ===
- Francis Capra - Jesse Murphy (2 episodes, season 3)
- Katie Carr - Caitlin (6 episodes, season 2)
- Kevin Chamberlin - Aaron Malsky (3 episodes, season 1)
- Sally Champlin - Lynette the Waitress (6 episodes, season 1 and 4)
- Josh Clark - Sheriff Davidson (4 episodes, season 1)
- Assaf Cohen - Hesam (4 episodes, seasons 3–4)
- Ethan Cohn - Zane Taylor (4 episodes, season 1 and 4)
- Mark Colson - Mr. Zern (3 episodes, season 2)
- Daryl Crittenden - Chris Bowman (7 episodes, season 4)
- Ashley Crow - Sandra Bennet (40 episodes, season 1–4)

=== D ===
- Nicholas D'Agosto - West Rosen (9 episodes, season 2)
- Thomas Dekker - Zach (12 episodes, season 1)
- Michael Dorn - President (2 episodes, season 3)
- Clea DuVall - Audrey Hanson (7 episodes, season 1)

=== E ===
- Christopher Eccleston - Claude (5 episodes, season 1)
- Justin Evans - Simon Petrelli (6 episodes, season 1–2)

=== F ===
- Bill Fagerbakke - Steve R. Gustavson (2 episodes, season 1)
- Chad Faust - Scott (2 episodes, season 3)
- Louise Fletcher - Dr. Coolidge (2 episodes, season 4)
- Robert Forster - Arthur Petrelli (9 episodes, season 3)
- Colby French - Hank (4 episodes, season 1)

=== G ===
- Ashlee Gillespie - Lori Tremmel (2 episodes, season 1)
- Jessalyn Gilsig - Meredith Gordon (10 episodes, season 1 and 3)
- Brea Grant - Daphne Millbrook (16 episodes, season 3)
- Seth Green - Comic Book Store Guy (2 episodes, season 3)
- Demetrius Grosse - Baron Samedi (3 episodes, season 3)
- Ronald Guttman - Dr. Zimmerman (2 episodes, season 3)
- John Glover - List of Heroes characters#Samson Gray (2 episodes, season 3)

=== H ===
- Stacy Haiduk - Elisa Thayer (3 episodes, season 1)
- Cory Hardrict - Hype Wilson (2 episodes, season 2)
- Jamie Hector - Benjamin 'Knox' Washington (10 episodes, season 3)
- Ernie Hudson - Captain Lubbock (2 episodes, season 4)

=== I ===
- Željko Ivanek - Emile Danko (13 episodes, season 3–4)

=== J ===
- Sakina Jaffrey - Mrs. Suresh (3 episodes, season 1)
- Reginald James - Agent Harper (2 episodes, season 3)
- Jimmy Jean-Louis - The Haitian (32 episodes, season 1–4)
- Carlon Jeffery - Damon Dawson (3 episodes, season 2)
- Dutch Johnson - Linderman's Guard (2 episodes, season 1)

=== K ===
- Stana Katic - Hana Gitelman (2 episodes, season 1)
- Dominic Keating - Will (4 episodes, season 2)
- Swoosie Kurtz - Millie Houston (2 episodes, seasons 3 and 4)
- Shishir Kurup - Nirand (3 episodes, season 1)

=== L ===
- Lisa Lackey - Janice Parkman (18 episodes, season 1–4)
- Kavi Ladnier - Mira Shenoy (2 episodes, season 1 and 3)
- Ken Lally - The German (2 episodes, season 3)
- Matt Lanter - Brody Mitchum (5 episodes, season 1)
- David H. Lawrence XVII - Eric Doyle (13 episodes, seasons 3–4)
- Stan Lee - Bus Driver (1 episode, season 1)
- T.W. Leshner - Derek (2 episodes, season 2)

=== M ===
- Garrett Masuda - Young Hiro Nakamura (2 episodes, season 1)
- Tohoru Masamune - Mr. Egami (2 episodes, season 1–2)
- Michael Maury - Deputy Lloyd (2 episodes, season 1)
- Jayma Mays - Charlie Andrews (5 episodes, season 1, 4)
- Ntare Guma Mbaho Mwine - Usutu (10 episodes, season 3)
- Holt McCallany - Ricky (4 episodes, season 2)
- Adetokumboh McCormack - Tuko (4 episodes, season 2)
- Malcolm McDowell - Daniel Linderman (9 episodes, seasons 1 and 3)
- Rachel Melvin - Annie (2 episodes, season 4)
- Breckin Meyer -Comic Book Store Guy (2 episodes, season 3)
- Milos Milicevic - Big Guy (1 episode, season 1) and Hulk (1 episode, season 2)
- Kurando Mitsutake - Whitebeard (4 episodes, season 1–2)
- Ben Murray - Rufus (2 episodes, season 1)
- Ntare Mwine - Usutu (10 episodes, season 3)

=== N ===
- Saemi Nakamura - Kimiko Nakamura (6 episodes, season 1–2, 4)
- Mark Nearing - Nevada State Trooper (2 episodes, season 1)
- Daniel Newman - Jimmy Keppler (2 episodes, seasons 3 and 4)
- Paula Newsome - Dr. Witherson (2 episodes, season 1)
- Nichelle Nichols - Nana Dawson (5 episodes, season 2)

=== O ===
- Gabriel Olds - Agent Taub (2 episodes, season 3)
- Dawn Olivieri - Lydia (16 episodes, season 4)
- Shalim Ortiz - Alejandro Herrera (7 episodes, season 2)

=== P ===
- Janel Parrish - May (3 episodes, season 2–3)
- Ray Park - Edgar (9 episodes, season 4)
- Missy Peregrym - Candice Wilmer (6 episodes, season 1)
- Ron Perkins - Dr. Livitz (4 episodes, season 3)
- Harry Perry - Damien (5 episodes, season 4)
- Sasha Pieterse - Amanda Strazzulla (5 episodes, season 4)
- Missi Pyle - Hope (2 episodes, season 1)

=== Q ===
- Deirdre Quinn - Tina (7 episodes, season 1)

=== R ===
- Javin Reid - Sanjog Iyer (2 episodes, season 1)
- Eric Roberts - Thompson (7 episodes, seasons 1 and 3)
- Elisabeth Röhm - Lauren Gilmore (8 episodes, season 4)
- Franc Ross - Daniel Pine (3 episodes, season 3)
- Richard Roundtree - Charles Deveaux (5 episodes, season 1)

=== S ===
- Danielle Savre - Jackie Wilcox (9 episodes, season 1 and 4)
- Rusty Schwimmer - Dale Smither (2 episodes, season 1 and 4)
- Barry Shabaka Henley - Bryan Fuller (4 episodes, season 2)
- Blake Shields - Flint Gordon, Jr. (10 episodes, season 3)
- Jonny Siew - Nathan's Analyst (4 episodes, season 3)
- Ryan K. Smith - Deputy (2 episodes, season 1)
- Rena Sofer - Heidi Petrelli (5 episodes, season 1–2)
- Sara Solomon - Martha (2 episodes, season 2)
- Todd Stashwick - Eli (6 episodes, season 4)
- Mark Allan Stewart - High Roller (2 episodes, season 1)

=== T ===
- Cary-Hiroyuki Tagawa - The Swordsmith (2 episodes, season 2)
- Mio Takada - Tatsuya Atsumi (2 episodes, season 2)
- George Takei - Kaito Nakamura (12 episodes, season 1-4)
- Eriko Tamura (credited as Eriko) - Yaeko (6 episodes, season 2)
- Brian Tarantina - Weasel (2 episodes, season 1)
- Adair Tishler - Molly Walker (16 episodes, seasons 1-3)
- Stephen Tobolowsky - Bob Bishop (11 episodes, season 2–3)
- Tamlyn Tomita - Ishi Nakamura (2 episodes, seasons 1 and 4)
- Karri Turner - Lisa (2 episodes, season 1)
- Tessa Thompson - Rebecca Taylor (3 episodes, season 4)

=== V ===
- Kate Vernon - Vanessa Wheeler (2 episodes, season 4)

=== W ===
- Jack Wallace - Arnold (3 episodes, season 4)
- Joel West - Agent Daniel Simmons (2 episodes, season 3)
- Rick Worthy - Mike (3 episodes, season 4)
- Karl T. Wright - Principal Marks (2 episodes, season 1)
- Jackson Wurth - Monty Petrelli (6 episodes, season 1–2)

=== Y ===
- Mark L. Young - Jeremy Greer (2 episodes, season 4)

=== Z ===
- Nora Zehetner - Eden McCain (9 episodes, season 1)
- Madeline Zima - Gretchen Berg (11 episodes, season 4)
