= Eris Quod Sum =

- Heroes episode
- Episode no.: Season 3 Episode 7
- Directed by: Jeannot Szwarc
- Written by: Jesse Alexander
- Production code: 307
- Original air date: October 27, 2008

Guest appearances
- Kristen Bell as Elle Bishop; Jessalyn Gilsig as Meredith Gordon; Ashley Crow as Sandra Bennet; Jamie Hector as Knox; Brea Grant as Daphne Millbrook; Blake Shields as Flint Gordon, Jr.; Alan Blumenfeld as Maury Parkman; Ntare Mwine as Usutu; Ron Perkins as Dr. Livitz; Robert Forster as Arthur Petrelli; Randall Bentley as Lyle Bennet

Episode chronology
← Previous "Dying of the Light"	Next → "Villains"
- Heroes season 3

"Eris Quod Sum" is the seventh episode of the third season of the NBC superhero drama series Heroes and forty-first episode overall. The episode aired on October 27, 2008. "Eram quod es, eris quod sum" is a Latin phrase that is often found on gravestones and translates as "I was what you are, you will be what I am".

== Plot ==
Mohinder Suresh leaves Isaac Mendez's loft and takes Maya to Pinehearst Laboratories where he meets Arthur Petrelli. Arthur agrees to fix Maya, and so takes her ability for his own, "curing" her. After Maya leaves, clearly mistrustful after what Mohinder has put her through, Suresh is offered a place at Pinehearst's research lab. Arthur tells him that he can help with the side effects of Mohinder's injection (both halves of the formula can be seen in the lab) if Mohinder is willing to work for him.

Back at the loft, Nathan Petrelli and Tracy Strauss call Noah Bennet in order to decide what to do with Mohinder's victims. Bennet arrives with Nathan's ex-flame Meredith Gordon, and amidst the awkwardness, Tracy laughs at the twisted familial ties that the three share with each other and Claire.

Sandra and Claire Bennet return home and have a heart-to-heart about their current situation. When they get out of the car, the electricity goes haywire in their home, and before Sandra can check the circuit breakers, Claire finds Lyle on the floor barely conscious. He informs them that "the bitch is back" and Claire finds Elle Bishop in Noah's home office, struggling to control her electrical powers. Claire and Elle get into a fight, which ends when Lyle throws water over Elle, shocking her into submission. Elle apologizes and confesses that she came to the Bennet house looking for Noah, so that he could help her control her ability. Claire and Elle decide to travel to Pinehearst together, and learn why their abilities are changing. In the airplane, Elle's powers begin to surge again causing the plane to dive. Claire, however, grabs her and absorbs the current, allowing the plane to revert to normal.

In a dream, Angela tells Sylar to save Peter from Pinehearst. Angela tells him to show her why he is her favorite son. Sylar awakens from the coma and kisses his sleeping mother on the forehead, agreeing to rescue Peter. Sylar arrives just in time to stop Mohinder from using Peter as his first test subject. He kills the Pinehearst assistant and fights Mohinder, giving Peter a chance to escape. Mohinder knocks Sylar unconscious and expresses his desire to kill him, but Arthur tells him to stop, Sylar is his son and that Arthur has been waiting for him for a very long time.

Arthur orders Daphne to kill Matt for not joining the villains. Matt's father, Maury, protests vehemently, reminding Arthur that he agreed to help him in return for Matt's safety. During this protest Arthur uses his powers to snap Maury's neck. Daphne shows up at Matt's apartment and holds him at gunpoint. Upon reminding her of the future that he has seen, in which they marry and have a child, Daphne tearfully drops the gun. She tells him that Pinehearst will just send someone else, but Matt refuses to run away. Knox arrives shortly afterwards. He overhears them talking about how fearful they are, and smiles. He breaks through the door and kills Matt and Daphne. After he leaves, the scene dissolves and the real Matt and Daphne appear. Parkman had used his ability to manipulate Knox's mind. Afterwards, Daphne calls Arthur and tells him that Matt believes that she is on his side. Arthur warns Daphne not to blow her cover.

Arthur convinces Sylar that Angela is manipulating him. He tells him that Angela tried to drown him as a baby after dreaming Sylar's future. Peter returns to help Sylar escape, but Arthur arrives. The three argue, culminating with Sylar throwing Peter out of the seventh floor window. Elle and Claire arrive just as Peter hits the ground, and Claire rushes to help him. Peter tells them that Pinehearst took his abilities and that they must run, but Elle decides to enter the building, hoping to have her ability removed. Arthur and Sylar both imply that someone slowed Peter's fall, saving his life - Peter separately comes to the conclusion that it was Sylar. Claire calls Nathan, who is told of his father's return. Peter implores Nathan not to go to Arthur, saying that he is too dangerous and intends to kill them all, and Nathan agrees. Afterwards, Tracy remarks that Nathan has no intention of listening to Peter, and Nathan admits that he is going to look for his father, but it will not be a social call.

Hiro doubted Usutu's advice on how to handle his opponents and didn't want to go back in time to deal with them. Instead Usutu made an edible paste (which Matt Parkman had previously eaten). Hiro ate some and his eyes turned white (the usual sign of precognition), before passing out. Ando blamed Usutu for trickery but Usutu said that Hiro "did not choose a path, so one was chosen for him", as he had warned would happen.

== Critical reception ==
Steve Heisler of The A.V. Club rated this episode a D−.

Robert Canning of IGN gave the episode 6.8 out of 10.
