= Heroes season 3 =

Heroes
- Season 3
- DVD cover
- Starring: Jack Coleman; Greg Grunberg; Ali Larter; Masi Oka; Hayden Panettiere; Adrian Pasdar; Sendhil Ramamurthy; Milo Ventimiglia; James Kyson Lee; Zachary Quinto; Dania Ramirez; Cristine Rose
- No. of episodes: 25

Release
- Original network: NBC
- Original release: September 22, 2008 – April 27, 2009

Season chronology
- ← Previous; Season 2 Next → Season 4

The NBC superhero serial drama series Heroes follows the lives of people across the globe who possess various superhuman powers as they struggle to cope with their everyday lives and prevent foreseen disasters from occurring. The third season premiered on September 22, 2008, and was released on DVD on September 1, 2009.

Within the seasons of Heroes are "volumes", which allow the writers to focus on shorter story arcs. The third season comprised 25 episodes that aired in two blocks generally without reruns. The first 13 episodes of the season made up the third volume, Villains, and the final 12 comprise the fourth volume, Fugitives. The season premiered on September 22, 2008 in the United States on NBC and on Global in Canada, with a one-hour clip-show and two regular episodes. The DVD and Blu-ray were released on September 1, 2009 in the United States and Canada.

== Plot ==
"Villains", the season's first volume, began with the assassination attempt on Nathan Petrelli (Adrian Pasdar) by Peter Petrelli (Milo Ventimiglia) from the future, and explores its consequences. In addition, several villains with abilities escape from the Company's prisons. Some of them join forces with Arthur Petrelli (Robert Forster) (Peter's and Nathan's father) at Pinehearst Company, who wants to find a formula that gives ordinary people abilities in order to make the world a better place. Character arcs involve Tracy Strauss (Ali Larter) discovering her origins, Sylar (Zachary Quinto) trying to decide his loyalties, Peter losing his ability, Mohinder Suresh (Sendhil Ramamurthy) giving himself an ability, and Hiro Nakamura's (Masi Oka) discovery of a family secret.

The second part of season three, titled "Fugitives", involves what happens after Nathan fails to produce the formula. After the destruction of Primatech and Pinehearst, the heroes attempt to lead normal lives until Nathan tells the President of the United States (Michael Dorn) about people with abilities, and runs a government force, headed by Emile Danko (Željko Ivanek), to round them up. Micah Sanders (Noah Gray-Cabey), posing as "Rebel", starts to help people with abilities hide from the government. Meanwhile, Sylar searches for his father (John Glover).

== Cast and characters ==
=== Main characters ===
- Milo Ventimiglia as Peter Petrelli
- Adrian Pasdar as Nathan Petrelli
- Jack Coleman as Noah Bennet
- Sendhil Ramamurthy as Mohinder Suresh
- Cristine Rose as Angela Petrelli
- Zachary Quinto as Sylar
- Hayden Panettiere as Claire Bennet
- James Kyson Lee as Ando Masahashi
- Masi Oka as Hiro Nakamura
- Greg Grunberg as Matt Parkman
- Ali Larter as Tracy Strauss
- Dania Ramirez as Maya Herrera

=== Recurring characters ===
- Brea Grant as Daphne Millbrook
- Ashley Crow as Sandra Bennet
- Željko Ivanek as Emile Danko
- Jamie Hector as Benjamin "Knox" Washington
- Ntare Mwine as Usutu
- Blake Shields as Flint Gordon, Jr.
- Robert Forster as Arthur Petrelli
- David H. Lawrence XVII as Eric Doyle
- Kristen Bell as Elle Bishop
- Randall Bentley as Lyle Bennet
- Jessalyn Gilsig as Meredith Gordon
- Jimmy Jean-Louis as the Haitian
- Malcolm McDowell as Daniel Linderman
- David Anders as Adam Monroe
- Alan Blumenfeld as Maury Parkman
- George Takei as Kaito Nakamura
- Dan Byrd as Luke Campbell
- Francis Capra as Jesse Murphy
- Noah Gray-Cabey as Micah Sanders
- Demetrius Grosse as Baron Samedi
- Lisa Lackey as Janice Parkman
- Eric Roberts as Eric Thompson
- Adair Tishler as Molly Walker
- Stephen Tobolowsky as Bob Bishop

== Episodes ==
No. overall	No. in season	Title	Directed by	Written by	Original release date	US viewers (millions)
Volume Three: Villains
35	1	"The Second Coming"	Allan Arkush	Tim Kring	September 22, 2008	10.09
While Matt discovers the identity of the person who shot Nathan, Sylar seeks Claire to acquire her healing ability. Hiro learns of a secret about the Nakamura family that could have dire consequences on the world, namely a formula that could grant ordinary people abilities.
36	2	"The Butterfly Effect"	Greg Beeman	Tim Kring	September 22, 2008	10.09
Sylar confronts Elle at the Company, and 12 villains escape due to an ensuing battle. Meanwhile, Claire finds out more about her ability, and Ando travels with Hiro to Paris in pursuit of a speedster named Daphne Millbrook (Brea Grant).
37	3	"One of Us, One of Them"	Sergio Mimica-Gezzan	Joe Pokaski	September 29, 2008	9.50
Bennet and his new partner, Sylar, go after four villains at a bank heist. Peter tries to determine what goes wrong in the future. Hiro and Ando meet the Haitian (Jimmy Jean-Louis) in Germany. Tracy Strauss looks for information about Niki.
38	4	"I Am Become Death"	David Von Ancken	Aron Eli Coleite	October 6, 2008	8.20
Future Claire hunts down Peter (who gains Gabriel's ability and his hunger) in order to save the world. Tracy finds out about her origins while Mohinder learns the side effects of his power. Hiro and Ando try to break out of the Company's prison and meet Angela Petrelli and have to dig Adam Monroe (David Anders) back up.
39	5	"Angels and Monsters"	Anthony Hemingway	Adam Armus & Kay Foster	October 13, 2008	8.75
Claire faces Stephen Canfield (Andre Royo), an escaped villain that can create vortices. Peter has returned from the future, which he discovers has affected him deeply. After Adam is unhelpful in finding the formula, Hiro tries to befriend Daphne and Knox (Jamie Hector). Mohinder puts Maya in a bad situation while trying to correct errors in his research. Linderman tells Nathan to stay with Tracy, so that they can make great accomplishments.
40	6	"Dying of the Light"	Daniel Attias	Chuck Kim & Christopher Zatta	October 20, 2008	8.51
Hiro and others accept offers to join Pinehearst. After the Company is paralyzed, Peter goes to Pinehearst, its rival, for information. Claire and Sandra (Ashley Crow) try to save Meredith (Jessalyn Gilsig) from Doyle (David H. Lawrence XVII), one of the escaped villains. Nathan and Tracy come to Mohinder to learn where their abilities came from.
41	7	"Eris Quod Sum"	Jeannot Szwarc	Jesse Alexander	October 27, 2008	8.19
Having become monstrous, Mohinder attacks Nathan and Tracy, who try to save Maya and other subjects. Elle surprises the Bennet family. Angela tries to convince Sylar to save Peter from Pinehearst Industries. Daphne is ordered to kill Matt for not joining the villains. Hiro doubts Usutu's (Ntare Mwine) advice on how to handle his opponents.
42	8	"Villains"	Allan Arkush	Rob Fresco	November 10, 2008	7.85
To prepare for an eventual showdown with his foes, Hiro investigates defining moments in the pasts of Arthur Petrelli (Robert Forster), Sylar, and Flint (Blake Shields). He discovers that Meredith Gordon is Flint's older sister, and Arthur Petrelli ordered Linderman to kill Nathan, but ended up injuring Nathan's wife, Heidi, and that Arthur survived his supposedly fatal heart attack.
43	9	"It's Coming"	Greg Yaitanes	Tim Kring	November 17, 2008	7.65
Hiro escapes Arthur but believes himself to be ten years old. Arthur sends Knox and Flint to capture Peter and Claire. Ando helps Hiro re-discover his powers. Nathan has mixed feelings after meeting his father, but Tracy promises Arthur that she will persuade Nathan to join him. Sylar learns to access his empathy and reconciles with Elle. Mohinder begins testing a new combination of the formula and discovers the need for a catalyst. Matt wakes Angela from her coma.
44	10	"The Eclipse"	Greg Beeman	Aron Eli Coleite & Joe Pokaski	November 24, 2008	7.51
45	11	"The Eclipse"	Holly Dale	Aron Eli Coleite & Joe Pokaski	December 1, 2008	8.00
A second eclipse causes all of the heroes to lose their abilities. Arthur sends Elle and Sylar to capture Claire, who is under the care of her father and training to be able to fight off the villains. Claire is shot by Elle and can't heal without her powers. Elsewhere, Peter and Nathan go in search of the Haitian, while Matt, Hiro and Ando follow Daphne to find out what she has been hiding. While the eclipse continues to affect the Heroes' powers, Noah attempts to get revenge on Sylar and Elle for shooting Claire whose condition is worsening. Nathan comes to a shocking decision while working with Peter to help the Haitian face his brother, Baron Samedi. In the meantime, Ando and two comic book geeks (Seth Green and Breckin Meyer) use the 9th Wonders! comics to try to restore Hiro's memory who is reluctant to become an adult after seeing the death that lies with it.
46	12	"Our Father"	Jeannot Szwarc	Adam Armus & Kay Foster	December 8, 2008	7.72
To stop Arthur once and for all, Hiro and Claire travel back 16 years in time to when Hiro's father, Kaito (George Takei), handed baby Claire to Noah, while Peter teams up with the Haitian to finally stop Arthur, only to be intercepted by Sylar. Mohinder finally has a major breakthrough in the formula after Arthur obtains the catalyst from Hiro.
47	13	"Dual"	Greg Beeman	Jeph Loeb	December 15, 2008	7.87
After the death of Arthur, the Petrelli brothers find themselves against each other and Nathan makes a move that will have repercussions on the world. Sylar holds Claire, Noah, Meredith and Angela hostage, beginning a face-off at Primatech. Ando, Matt and Daphne continue their attempts to rescue Hiro from the past and Mohinder may be their only hope of achieving it.
Volume Four: Fugitives
48	14	"A Clear and Present Danger"	Greg Yaitanes	Tim Kring	February 2, 2009	8.55
After the destruction of Primatech and Pinehearst, the Heroes attempt to start new lives. Nathan Petrelli gains President and government support to hunt and capture all people with abilities. Peter Petrelli returns to his previous job as nurse. Hiro loses his ability and tries to make Ando a hero. Claire uncovers the plot by Nathan to hunt down and capture all people with abilities with the assistance of Noah Bennet. Sylar begins searching for his biological parents. Government forces capture Heroes including Peter, Matt, Hiro, Tracy, Mohinder and Claire. The plane that carries the captured Heroes crashes due to a fight in the plane.
49	15	"Trust and Blood"	Allan Arkush	Mark Verheiden	February 9, 2009	7.90
Following a chain of unexpected events, the Heroes are on the run from Nathan and Danko (Željko Ivanek). A series of prophetic paintings reveals the tragic fate of someone close to Matt. Elsewhere, Sylar continues the search for his father and encounters an outcast with information and an ability of his own.
50	16	"Building 26"	Sergio Mimica-Gezzan	Rob Fresco	February 16, 2009	7.74
Nathan's plans face exposure when the President (Michael Dorn) orders Homeland Security to start an investigation. Sylar embarks on a road trip to find his father with assistance from Luke (Dan Byrd), unaware of their pursuit by Nathan's agents. Elsewhere, Matt's prophetic images lead Hiro and Ando to India and the Heroes receive help from a mysterious ally.
51	17	"Cold Wars"	Seith Mann	Christopher Zatta and Aron Eli Coleite & Joe Pokaski	February 23, 2009	7.07
Matt interrogates the captured Noah to find out how he began working with Nathan to abduct those with abilities. The information Matt uncovers leads Peter to confront Danko.
52	18	"Exposed"	Eric Laneuville	Adam Armus & Kay Foster	March 2, 2009	7.15
Acting on a tip from "Rebel", Peter and Matt head to Building 26 to find Daphne. Claire helps Alex escape and is assisted by her mother, Sandra. Sylar and Luke hunt down a place Sylar's father once visited.
53	19	"Shades of Gray"	Greg Beeman	Oliver Grigsby	March 9, 2009	6.70
Sylar finds his father and learns that he is dying of cancer. Claire contemplates whether she should help Eric Doyle. Nathan and Danko engage in a power struggle over operations of Building 26.
54	20	"Cold Snap"	Greg Yaitanes	Bryan Fuller	March 23, 2009	6.47
Danko considers releasing Tracy so she'll lead him to Rebel. Elsewhere, Angela seeks help from an old friend (Swoosie Kurtz); Hiro and Ando continue their latest mission chosen by Rebel, whose identity is revealed as Micah Sanders (Noah Gray-Cabey).
55	21	"Into Asylum"	Jim Chory	Joe Pokaski	March 30, 2009	6.42
Nathan and Claire go hiding in Mexico. Danko's plan to destroy everyone with abilities is set into motion with an unlikely ally. Sylar acquires a new ability allowing him to change his appearance. Meanwhile, Angela and Peter seek refuge in a church and begin to mend their broken relationship.
56	22	"Turn and Face the Strange"	Jeannot Szwarc	Rob Fresco & Mark Verheiden	April 6, 2009	6.11
Matt is out for revenge against Danko. Hiro and Ando continue their road trip to deliver Matt Parkman Jr. to his father. Angela, Nathan, Peter and Claire come together to unearth secrets from the past.
57	23	"1961"	Adam Kane	Aron Eli Coleite	April 13, 2009	6.83
Angela reveals the dark secrets that have haunted her for years, while Mohinder learns that his father was involved in a long-forgotten government operation.
58	24	"I Am Sylar"	Allan Arkush	Adam Armus & Kay Foster	April 20, 2009	6.46
Sylar has an unexpected identity crisis while continuing to work with Danko. Hiro and Ando plan to take down Building 26. Matt's newfound fatherhood changes his plans. Nathan comes up with a plan to correct his government operation.
59	25	"An Invisible Thread"	Greg Beeman	Tim Kring	April 27, 2009	6.47
Nathan and Peter try to prevent Sylar from meeting the President. Angela seeks out Matt because of a dream that he will save Nathan. Sylar has his own agenda regarding his partner. Hiro finds there are consequences that come with the return of his powers.

== Reception ==
Season three of Heroes started with strong ratings that dropped steadily throughout the season. The season's finale placed last in its timeslot.

This season was met with mixed to negative reception with most criticism directed towards the storylines, writing and characters. However many retrospective reviews have considered the second half, "Fugitives", to be a major improvement over the previous two seasons.

== Home media ==
The Season 3 DVD Box set was released in North America on September 1, 2009, and in Australia on September 2, 2009 with an alternative cover, and in the UK on October 12, 2009.
