= The Eclipse (Heroes) =

- Heroes episodes
- Episode nos.: Season 3 Episodes 10 and 11
- Written by: Aron Eli Coleite and; Joe Pokaski
- Production codes: 310 and 311
- Original air dates: November 24, 2008; December 1, 2008

Guest appearances
- Kristen Bell as Elle Bishop; Ashley Crow as Sandra Bennet; Jimmy Jean-Louis as the Haitian; Brea Grant as Daphne Millbrook; Blake Shields as Flint Gordon, Jr.; Ray Baker as Mr. Millbrook; David H. Lawrence XVII as Eric Doyle; Brian Palermo as Rental car agent; Demetrius Grosse as Baron Samedi; Seth Green as Sam; Breckin Meyer as Frack; Robert Forster as Arthur Petrelli; Meera Simhan as Doctor; Franc Ross as Daniel Pine; George Takei as Kaito Nakamura; Sekai Murashige as Young Hiro Nakamura; Sonalii Castillo as Marie

Episode chronology
← Previous "It's Coming"	Next → "Our Father"
- Heroes season 3

"The Eclipse" is a two-part episode, consisting of the tenth and eleventh episodes of the third season of the NBC superhero drama series Heroes. The first part aired on November 24, 2008, and the second part aired on December 1, 2008.

== Plot ==
=== Part 1 ===
A second eclipse causes all of the heroes and villains to lose their abilities. Mohinder Suresh has lost all of his scales and abilities due to the eclipse, so he attempts to go in search of Maya to apologize to her, but Arthur insists that he remain and find a way to return all of their powers. Arthur sends Elle and Sylar to get Claire who is being trained to fight by Noah at Stephen Canfield's previous residence. During the "training", Claire then reveals that she is still angry that he walked out on their family. Elle and Sylar show up and, when Elle aims her gun at Noah, Claire jumps in front of him and is shot. Noah disarms the also-depowered Sylar and Elle easily and takes Claire, who is unable to heal, home. Elsewhere, Peter and Nathan attempt to reach the Haitian, who is in his childhood village attempting to capture his brother, Baron Samedi. When Nathan loses his powers in mid-flight, the two continue the search by foot. However, it's not long before soldiers find the brothers and open fire on them. They run through the forest, but Baron Samedi takes Nathan hostage under the orders of Arthur Petrelli. In his apartment, Matt is unable to restore Hiro's memories because Hiro thinks in Japanese. He goes in search of Daphne, with Hiro and Ando in tow, and discovers that she had cerebral palsy, which forces her to use leg braces and crutches, and that her power was the only thing keeping her disability from affecting her. Meanwhile, Ando enlists the help of two comic book nerds (guest stars Seth Green and Breckin Meyer) to help restore Hiro's memory. Sylar appears relieved to be free of his hunger for powers, while Elle is distressed, knowing that it will be harder to act ruthless without powers. Sylar and Elle begin to kiss, as Noah Bennet sights them in his sniper rifle scope from a nearby roof.

=== Part 2 ===
Daphne reveals that her disease kept her from walking until the last eclipse, when she gained her powers which restored her ability to walk. After explaining to Matt she orders him to leave which he does as her father returns. At the comic book store, Hiro goes through all of the 9th Wonders! issues in an attempt to regain his memory. Upon finding the more unpleasant events (fighting Sylar, the death of his father, etc.), he runs to hide in the bathroom not wanting to "grow up."

Claire is rushed to the hospital when the gunshot wound infection becomes serious, a symptom of having previous powers that kept her immune system from acquiring antibodies making it appear as though she'd had a gunshot wound for far longer. Preoccupied with exacting revenge on Elle and Sylar, Noah Bennet leaves his wife to deal with hospital staff and police questioning. Sylar and Elle are unaware of Noah as they had just had sex, when Elle sees a red dot appear across Sylar's forehead and they are able to escape the house, with Elle being shot in the leg. They make it to a storage warehouse, where they decide to do everything together, now that their powers are gone, but when they see Bennet on the monitor, Sylar shoves Elle into an elevator shaft to save her. At the same time that Claire dies in the hospital of septic shock, Noah slits Sylar's throat.

In Haiti, Peter and the Haitian rescue Nathan and two kidnapped girls. The eclipse ends and everyone's powers return. Nathan uses his power of flight to slam Baron Samedi into a car, but Samedi survives. The Haitian then apparently wipes his brother's mind completely. The experience prompts Nathan to see sense in his father's vision, arguing that giving more people powers would end genocide. At the hospital, Claire's powers return where she regenerates from her wounds and escapes with her mother.

Mohinder, who has managed to knock out his guard (Flint), goes to Maya's apartment. He knocks on her door, but like everyone else, his powers have returned along with his scaly skin. Before she has a chance to open the door and see him, he runs away and returns to Pinehearst.

Sam (Seth Green), using Ando as a translator, gives an inspiring speech to Hiro that restores his confidence and will to continue. Frack (Breckin Meyer), in the meantime, finds a clue in an earlier issue to what Hiro needs to do next and where to go: he believes that Hiro needs to take Claire and travel back sixteen years to when Kaito Nakamura handed the infant Claire off to Noah Bennet (a scene first shown as one of Noah Bennet's flashbacks in "Company Man"); Hiro may be able to recover his memories there. Taking that issue and using an image from issue #31 (the issue depicting the episode's events that Sam and Frack were looking at the end of part 1), he teleports away to get Claire.The two then go to the comic book store, wondering what to do next, but they've reached the end of the latest issue, and since the comic's author is dead, can expect no more. However, Sam remembers a story he heard that there is still one untold 9th Wonders story left: it's in the sketchbook Isaac Mendez gave to the bike courier the day he died and if Matt, Daphne and Ando find that courier, they'll find that last story.

Matt returns to Daphne's farm after learning that their powers returned. He convinces her to reconcile with her father, who she'd abandoned when she first got her powers.

At the Bennet home, Noah Bennet returns to an angry Claire who is disappointed he wasn't there for her in the hospital. When he finds out she was able to return to life, he panics as he realizes that Sylar will have regenerated too. Sure enough, Sylar and Elle are waiting downstairs, holding Sandra hostage. As Sylar holds him up against a wall with telekinesis, Noah reveals that Angela and Arthur lied about being his parents, that they were simply using him, and says Elle knows the truth too. Sylar starts to cut Bennet's throat with his powers, but Hiro teleports in and takes both him and Elle away.

On the beach Hiro teleported them to, Sylar decides that trying to change is futile, saying that he and Elle are just "damaged goods" and will never change and resolves to return to his familiar murderous ways. He starts by opening up Elle's skull.

Hiro teleports away with Claire to sixteen years in the past where they witness Kaito handing over baby Claire to Noah Bennet.

== Critical reception ==
Steve Heisler of The A.V. Club rated the first part a C− and the second part a D−.

Robert Canning of IGN gave the first part 6.8 out of 10 and the second part 6.3 out of 10.
