= Turn and Face the Strange =

- Heroes episode
- Episode no.: Season 3 Episode 22
- Directed by: Jeannot Szwarc
- Written by: Rob Fresco and; Mark Verheiden
- Production code: 322
- Original air date: April 6, 2009

Guest appearances
- Ashley Crow as Sandra Bennet; Katherine Boecher as Alena; Kenneth Choi as Sam Douglas; Ned Vaughn as Agent Steve Donner; Željko Ivanek as Emile Danko

Episode chronology
← Previous "Into Asylum"	Next → "1961"
- Heroes season 3

"Turn and Face the Strange" is the twenty-second episode of the third season of the NBC superhero drama series Heroes and fifty-sixth episode overall. The episode aired on April 6, 2009.

== Synopsis ==
Noah Bennet examines Sylar's corpse from the previous episode, who is in fact James Martin having shape-shifted to look like Sylar before dying. Noah becomes suspicious when Emile Danko doesn't give a clear explanation on how he managed to kill Sylar, but he is then surprised by a visit from his wife Sandra Bennet. Sandra is worried about the whereabouts of their daughter Claire Bennet, but Noah assures her she is safe. Danko and Sandra meet briefly, before Sandra leaves and tells Noah she will be staying in Washington, D.C. until she knows for sure where Claire is. Afterwards, the Danko that had spoken to Noah and Sandra before is revealed to be Sylar, who announces his intentions to the real Danko to utterly ruin Noah's life.

Noah checks on "Sylar's" body, removing the spike in his head. Seeing that he isn't healing, Noah orders a DNA analysis from the body. Afterwards, Sandra meets Noah in his apartment. Noah is shocked, however, when Sandra asks Noah to sign divorce papers, claiming she doesn't love him anymore before leaving. Noah later looks over the paperwork and notices her signature doesn't match that from previous documents. He also receives the DNA test results, and seeing that it matches that of Martin, realizes Sylar has shape-shifting abilities and that Sylar, not Sandra, had given him the divorce papers. Noah angrily confronts Sandra at her hotel with a gun, believing her to be Sylar, though he soon finds out she is the real Sandra. Noah explains what Sylar did, but Sandra furiously tells Noah to leave. Afterwards, back at Building 26, Noah pretends to be Sylar having morphed into him, and baits Danko with some files he claimed to have found. When Danko responds positively to this, Noah reveals himself and, holding Danko at gunpoint, demands to know where Sylar is. Danko reveals Sylar morphed to appear as an agent so he could track people with abilities along with his people. Noah confronts the man and ends up shooting him. However, the man fails to come back to life, and Danko says he has just killed an innocent man. Noah is forced to flee from the area, though the man is in fact revealed to be Sylar, having simply pretended to have died.

Hiro Nakamura and Ando Masahashi continue their journey with Matt Parkman's baby to save Matt Parkman. They run into a little trouble when they discover the baby causes their car to fail when he is upset; Ando is able to make the baby happy to keep their car running. Meanwhile, Matt decides to go after Danko to avenge Daphne Millbrook. Matt uses his telepathy on Danko to discover he is romantically involved with a woman named Alena. Matt confronts Alena alone, where he discovers Danko has been keeping what he does a secret from her. Matt takes Alena to Danko's apartment, where he forces Danko to reveal the truth about himself to Alena. Matt then intends to kill Alena so Danko can feel what he lost, but he is unable to and surrenders. Danko draws his gun, and Matt asks him to finish it, deciding he has nothing to live for. However, Hiro arrives and is able to stop time just before the bullet reaches Matt; Hiro then safely extracts Matt from the apartment before reverting time again. Alena then leaves Danko, disgusted at what he truly is. Hiro and Ando then show Matt his son, explaining he does have something to live for.

Angela Petrelli contacts Noah, saying she has had a dream and telling him to meet her at a place called Coyote Sands so she can explain something. She also contacts Nathan Petrelli and Claire, telling them to meet her there as well. After failing to convince Matt from taking his vengeful path, Mohinder Suresh heads back to his old apartment in New York, where he discovers some old files of his late father. The files refer to a 1960s government program known as "Project Icarus," where the location of Coyote Sands is also mentioned; he then finds evidence that his father had been there. Peter Petrelli and Angela drive to the site, where they meet Nathan and Claire, having flown there. Angela explains that they will have to dig for their answers, and they soon discover human skeletal remains. Angela says she not only knows who it was, but that she knows who "all of them" were. Claire then sees Noah drive up to their location, as Nathan and Peter continue to unearth other skeletons.

== Critical reception ==
Steve Heisler of The A.V. Club rated this episode an F.

Robert Canning of IGN gave the episode 7.3 out of 10.
