= Dying of the Light (Heroes) =

- Heroes episode
- Matt Parkman returns to America with his new turtle friend in search for Daphne.
- Episode no.: Season 3 Episode 6
- Directed by: Daniel Attias
- Written by: Chuck Kim and; Christopher Zatta
- Production code: 306
- Original air date: October 20, 2008

Guest appearances
- David Anders as Adam Monroe; Jessalyn Gilsig as Meredith Gordon; Ashley Crow as Sandra Bennet; Jamie Hector as Knox; Brea Grant as Daphne Millbrook; Blake Shields as Flint Gordon, Jr.; Alan Blumenfeld as Maury Parkman; Ntare Mwine as Usutu; David H. Lawrence XVII as Eric Doyle; Ron Perkins as Dr. Livitz; Robert Forster as Arthur Petrelli; Malcolm McDowell as Daniel Linderman

Episode chronology
← Previous "Angels and Monsters"	Next → "Eris Quod Sum"
- Heroes season 3

"Dying of the Light" is the sixth episode of the third season of the NBC superhero drama series Heroes and fortieth episode overall. The episode aired on October 20, 2008.

== Plot ==
Knox escorts Adam through Pinehearst to Arthur Petrelli's room. Adam is terrified so Knox, with his increased strength, forces Adam's hand into Arthur's; Adam, screaming, rapidly begins to age and decay, turning into a pile of dust in seconds. Arthur sits up and removes the tube from his throat, having obtained Adam's cellular regenerative ability.

Daphne finds Matt Parkman, who knows her without having even met her. He explains that he had a prophetic vision of his future in Africa, where they are married and have a child named Daniella. Daphne gives him a card for Pinehearst and speeds off. Daphne penetrates Level 5 and meets with Sylar, who rejects her offer. Sylar releases Peter.

Claire and Sandra try to save Meredith from Doyle, one of the escaped villains, but the plan goes awry and they are all captured. Doyle decides to make the three women play a twisted version of Russian Roulette until Claire persuades Sandra to shoot her. Claire quickly regenerates and knocks Doyle unconscious.

Ando and Hiro appear at Usutu's hut in Africa, where Usutu directs them to a painting showing Arthur and his assembled villains that they need to face: Arthur Petrelli, Sylar, Flint and Knox, along with the double helix.

Mohinder gives Tracy and Nathan injections, which he claims are DNA markers. Tracy collapses unconscious and a horrified Nathan lunges at Mohinder, falling into the next room and seeing cocooned figures before falling into a coma as well. Mohinder prepares to experiment on Nathan and Tracy, but they escape.

Peter and Sylar visit Angela, which convinces Peter to visit Pinehearst. Sylar believes he is too weak, and after a fight, Peter confines him to a cell. Knox, Arthur says that Peter is his son, and asks for a hug. Peter agrees, and Arthur steals Peter's powers.

== Critical reception ==
Steve Heisler of The A.V. Club rated this episode a C−.

Robert Canning of IGN gave the episode 8.5 out of 10.
