= Mbiriizi =

- Map of Uganda showing the location of Mbiriizi.
- Coordinates: 00°23′24″S 31°27′43″E
- Country: Uganda
- Region: Central Region of Uganda
- District: Lwengo District
- Time zone: UTC+3 (EAT)

Mbiriizi is a town in the southern part of the Central Region of Uganda. It is the administrative center of Lwengo District.

== Location ==
Mbiriizi is approximately 37 kilometres (23 mi), by road, west of Masaka, the nearest large city, on the all-weather highway between Masaka and Mbarara. This is approximately 165 kilometres (103 mi), by road, south-west of Kampala, the capital and largest city of Uganda. The coordinates of the town are 00 23 33S, 31 27 30E (Latitude: -0.3927; Longitude:31.4585).

== Overview ==
The town lies along the Masaka-Mbarara Road which connects to Kampala, Uganda's capital to the east and Kigali, the capital city of Rwanda to the southwest.

== Culture ==
The 2024 documentary Memories of Love Returned, by Ugandan American filmmaker and actor Ntare Guma Mbaho Mwine, documents the life and work of Mbiriizi photographer Kibaate Aloysius Ssalongo.

== Points of interest ==
The following points of interest lie within the town limits or near the town edges: (a) The headquarters of Lwengo District Administration (b) Finance Trust Bank (c) Offices of Lwengo Town Council (d) Offices of Electoral Commission Lwengo District (e) Masaka-Mbarara Road, which passes through the middle of town in a general east/west direction (f) Mbiriizi Advanced Primary School.

== See also ==
- List of cities and towns in Uganda
