= Angels and Monsters =

- Heroes episode
- Episode no.: Season 3 Episode 5
- Directed by: Anthony Hemingway
- Written by: Adam Armus and Kay Foster
- Production code: 305
- Original air date: October 13, 2008

Guest appearances
- David Anders as Takezo Kensei; Jessalyn Gilsig as Meredith Gordon; Ashley Crow as Sandra Bennet; Jamie Hector as Knox; Brea Grant as Daphne Millbrook; Andre Royo as Stephen Canfield; Alan Blumenfeld as Maury Parkman; Ron Perkins as Dr. Livitz; David H. Lawrence XVII as Eric Doyle; Robert Forster as Arthur Petrelli; Malcolm McDowell as Daniel Linderman

Episode chronology
← Previous "I Am Become Death"	Next → "Dying of the Light"
- Heroes season 3

"Angels and Monsters" is the fifth episode of the third season of the NBC superhero drama series Heroes and thirty-ninth episode overall. The episode aired on October 13, 2008.

== Plot ==
Claire faces Stephen Canfield, an escaped villain that can create vortices. Peter has returned from the future, which he discovers has affected him deeply. After Adam is unhelpful in finding the formula, Hiro tries to befriend Daphne and Knox. Mohinder puts Maya in a bad situation while trying to correct errors in his research. Linderman tells Nathan to stay with Tracy, so that they can make great accomplishments.

== Critical reception ==
Steve Heisler of The A.V. Club rated this episode a D+.

Robert Canning of IGN gave the episode 7.3 out of 10.
