= 1961 (Heroes) =

- Heroes episode
- Angela (Alexa Nikolas) and Alice (Laura Marano) Shaw at Coyote Sands in 1961.
- Episode no.: Season 3 Episode 23
- Directed by: Adam Kane
- Written by: Aron Eli Coleite
- Production code: 323
- Original air date: April 13, 2009

Guest appearances
- Diana Scarwid as Alice Shaw; Ravi Kapoor as Young Chandra Suresh; Alexa Nikolas as Young Angela Shaw; Edwin Hodge as Young Charles Deveaux; Laura Marano as Young Alice Shaw; Michael Croner as Young Bob Bishop; Casey Kringlen as Young Daniel Linderman; Zachary Knower as Mr. Shaw; Ginger Pauley as Mrs. Shaw; Jon Donahue as Young Jonas Zimmerman; Sofie Calderon as Waitress

Episode chronology
← Previous "Turn and Face the Strange"	Next → "I Am Sylar"
- Heroes season 3

"1961" is the twenty-third episode of the third season of the NBC superhero drama series Heroes and fifty-seventh episode overall. The episode aired on April 13, 2009.

== Plot ==
Angela Petrelli has gathered the family--- sons Nathan and Peter, granddaughter Claire Bennet, and Claire's adoptive father Noah--- at the abandoned settlement of Coyote Sands, and prepares to explain what had happened there.

It is revealed that back in 1961, the site had been a relocation center, sponsored by the government, to study people with abilities. Angela and her sister, Alice Shaw, were two of many children sent there. Angela soon met the younger Bob Bishop, Daniel Linderman, and Charles Deveaux. Alice, who is revealed to have the ability to control the weather, remains suspicious of the project's intentions, headed by Chandra Suresh, with Dr. Zimmerman also working there. Angela insists they are here to be treated, but Charles and the others convince Angela they have essentially become prisoners. The four soon hatch a plan to escape, though the boys convince Angela that Alice must remain behind, as it would slow them down. Angela lies to Alice, saying she had had a dream that showed Alice must remain there. That night, Chandra Suresh calls Alice in for treatment, but she refuses and ends up causing a storm. The ensuing chaos escalates in a riot, resulting in the deaths of most of those in the camp. Later, Angela meets with the three boys at Coyote Sands Cafe (where she had shared a dance with Charles), explaining she has dreamt of their future and that they must form a company, and do terrible things ("It's a necessary evil"), to keep people like them safe from others.

In the present, Angela begins to think that Alice may still be alive after a vicious sandstorm quickly whips up. The group also finds Mohinder Suresh there, investigating what his father had been doing. At first, Peter thinks what they are doing is wrong and flies off. Nathan tracks him down, and the two reconcile. They return to find only Claire, as Angela has disappeared after venturing into the storm. Peter and Mohinder search one side of the settlement, while Noah, Nathan, and Claire search the other. Claire discovers the cover for the "Alice In Wonderland" book that Alice had with her and laments that everything she's been through has caused her to grow up too fast; Mohinder laments that his generation is doomed to repeat their parents' mistakes, as Peter tries to help him cope.

Angela, who was knocked out during the storm, awakens in an old bunker. She finds her sister Alice, who had been living there since Angela had left. Angela apologizes for what she had to go through, and reveals her lies to her. Enraged, Alice begins whipping up another storm, though Peter and Mohinder come to save Angela. Angela tries to convince Alice to come back with them, to her new family, but Alice refuses and disappears outside. The group decide to leave, though Mohinder declines Peter's offer to go with them. Later at the Coyote Sands Cafe, Angela implies she intends to start another company with the group. Nathan gives Angela the "Alice In Wonderland" book, reunited with its cover, and helps Angela overcome her guilt over losing Alice again. Peter states the importance of forgiveness and the strength of family, and Claire asks about their next move. Nathan tells Claire that he will own up to his mistakes and speak with the President in Washington. Claire draws the group's attention to what appears to be Nathan himself giving a press conference on TV; Noah recognizes him as Sylar.

== Critical reception ==
Josh Modell of The A.V. Club rated this episode a D−.

Robert Canning of IGN gave the episode 8.3 out of 10.
