= Fight or Flight (Heroes) =

- Heroes episode
- Episode no.: Season 2 Episode 5
- Directed by: Lesli Glatter
- Written by: Joy Blake and Melissa Blake
- Production code: 205
- Original air date: October 22, 2007

Guest appearances
- Jimmy Jean-Louis as the Haitian; Alan Blumenfeld as Maury Parkman; Holt McCallany as Ricky; Eriko as Yaeko; Lisa Lackey as Janice Parkman; Katie Carr as Caitlin; Jeanette Brox as Camille; Adair Tishler as Molly Walker; Nichelle Nichols as Nana Dawson; Stephen Tobolowsky as Bob Bishop; Dominic Keating as Will; Adetokumboh McCormack as Tuko

Episode chronology
← Previous "The Kindness of Strangers"	Next → "The Line"
- Heroes season 2

"Fight or Flight" is the fifth episode of the second season of the NBC superhero drama series Heroes. It aired on October 22, 2007. This episode marks the first appearance of Elle, played by Kristen Bell, credited as a series regular. David Anders (Takezo Kensei) is also credited as a series regular from this episode.

== Plot ==
As Peter Petrelli settles into his new life with Caitlin, a young woman named Elle – soon revealed to possess the ability to conjure electricity – searches for him at the Cork docks.

Will directs her to the Wandering Rocks Pub. Ricky gets wind of Elle's search and sends Peter to stay at Caitlin's flat, rejecting his offer to deal with Elle on his own.

While at Caitlin's, Peter decides to open the box, and finds (among other items) his passport, a plane ticket from New York City to Montreal, and a photo of himself and Nathan (whom he doesn't recognize).

While frustrated about the lack of useful information in the box, Peter accidentally taps into his precognitive ability and paints a picture, befuddling Caitlin in the process.

The final picture shows Peter and Caitlin outside what looks like to be the Notre-Dame Basilica in Montreal. At the same time, Elle visits the Wandering Rocks Pub and meets Ricky, who lies about seeing Peter. Elle uses her ability to weld the doors closed and electrocutes Ricky, leaving his horrifically charred corpse behind.

Later, she receives a phone call from a man she identifies as “Daddy”. For killing Ricky, she is ordered to halt her assignment of finding Peter and return to the Company headquarters.

Peter and Caitlin are summoned to the Pub. Caitlin is distraught by her brother's death and is not comforted when Peter confesses that Ricky's killer was there looking for him. The episode ends on his ominous statement, "I can't hide anymore. I can't hide."

Monica Dawson is questioned by the police concerning the attempted robbery (from "The Kindness of Strangers"). She refuses to identify the assailant, a local hoodlum, for fear of retribution.

Later, she is speaking to Micah Sanders at the Dawson home and unconsciously mimics his piano skills. Micah figures out that she has an ability and confesses his own to her. Using a 9th Wonders! comic book as an example, he theorizes that Monica possesses muscle mimicry, which is the ability to mimic any physical action she sees.

Together, the two test her ability's limits; she copies a complicated jump rope routine and martial arts moves from Dragon: The Bruce Lee Story but is interrupted by Dr. Mohinder Suresh.

Matt Parkman recruits Nathan Petrelli on his mission to find Maury Parkman, his father, and help Molly. The two find Maury in his apartment in Philadelphia, and discover that he possesses a powerful form of telepathy. Maury has also received the same death threat as Kaito Nakamura and Angela Petrelli.

Under the pretense of getting something for Matt, Maury traps him, and Nathan who follows them, in mental illusions while he escapes. In Matt's illusion, he is trapped in a prison cell where a vision of his ex-wife, Janice, appears holding a baby and claiming that Matt walked out on her and her son, threatening he'll eventually do the same to Molly. He is assaulted by a prison guard when he tries to leave the cell after Janice.

Nathan's illusion places him on the roof of the Deveaux Building in a post-bomb New York, where he meets and fights a horribly burned vision of himself. As it turns out, Nathan and Matt, are actually fighting each other. Matt is able to project his own thoughts into Nathan's mind and they are able to snap out of the vision before serious injury. In a quick search of Maury's apartment, Matt finds another of the death threats, this one for Bob.

While Matt is gone, Mohinder considers taking Molly to the Company for their help. He calls Noah Bennet (who is with the Haitian in Red Square, Moscow, Russia), who advises him to leave the Company out of their affairs, but Mohinder is more concerned with Molly's safety and takes her to Bob and the Company doctors.

As Bob assigns Mohinder to retrieve a girl with abilities, Niki Sanders manages to break through the Company's internal security and attack Bob, but Mohinder disables her with an air taser.

Once Niki is restrained, Mohinder tries to help her escape the Company hospital, but Niki insists that she is sick and must stay. At the end of the episode, Mohinder goes on his assignment; he meets Monica Dawson at her house and offers her answers to her questions.

Ando Masahashi continues to read through Hiro Nakamura's messages from feudal Japan, with the aid of experts in the period working for Yamagato Industries.

The scrolls describe how Hiro has been assisting Takezo Kensei and Yaeko to track down maps leading to Whitebeard's camp. According to Hiro, history is falling back into place, including the romance between Kensei and Yaeko.

At the end of their story, Hiro, Kensei and Yaeko climb a ridge outside the camp and find Whitebeard's army.

The story told by Hiro's scrolls ends when the final written characters can't be deciphered. Ando is left wondering how Hiro's journey concluded.

== Narration ==
At the beginning

When confronted by our worst nightmares the choices are few: fight or flight. We hope to find the strength to stand against our fears, but sometimes, despite ourselves, we run. What if the nightmare gives chase? Where do we hide then?

== Critical reception ==
In the 18-49 demographic, "Fight or Flight" earned a 4.9/11 ratings share. This episode was watched by 10.80 million viewers.

The episode received generally positive reviews from critics. Kristen Bell's debut as Elle received universal praise from critics and fans. Sean O'Neal of The A.V. Club gave the episode a B.

Robert Canning of IGN scored the episode 7 out of 10
