= Memories of Love Returned =

- Directed by: Ntare Guma Mbaho Mwine
- Written by: Ntare Guma Mbaho Mwine
- Produced by: Ntare Guma Mbaho Mwine
- Starring: Kibaate Aloysius Ssalongo
- Edited by: Joe Fenstermaker
- Release date: 2024
- Running time: 76 minutes
- Countries: Uganda; United States
- Languages: Luganda; English

Memories of Love Returned is a 2024 documentary film directed, written, and produced by Ugandan American filmmaker and actor Ntare Guma Mbaho Mwine. Executive produced by Steven Soderbergh, the film chronicles the life and work of Kibaate Aloysius Ssalongo, a rural Ugandan photographer whose vast archive documented the town of Mbirizi for over five decades.

The film premiered on the festival circuit in late 2024 and 2025, winning several awards, including Best Documentary at the Zanzibar International Film Festival and the Audience Award for Best Feature Documentary at the Pan African Film Festival.

== Synopsis ==
The documentary traces a 22-year journey that began by chance. In April 2002, while driving through the small town of Mbirizi in central Uganda, Ntare Guma Mbaho Mwine's car broke down. While waiting for repairs, he stumbled upon a local photography studio run by Kibaate Aloysius Ssalongo. Mwine discovered that Kibaate had been documenting the lives of the town's residents since the 1950s, amassing a massive but largely unseen archive of negatives.

The film operates as both a biography of Kibaate and a visual history of post-independence Uganda. It details Mwine's decades-long effort to archive Kibaate's work, culminating in a large-scale outdoor photography exhibition held in Mbiriizi. The exhibition allowed the community to encounter their own forgotten history, wedding portraits, graduations, and everyday moments of joy.

== Production ==
=== Development ===
The film's inception traces back to Mwine's accidental meeting with Kibaate in 2002. Recognizing the historical significance of the photographer's collection, Mwine spent over two decades visiting Mbirizi, conducting interviews, and digitizing the negatives. Mwine has described the film as a "fugue" where the town's history and his own artistic inquiry intertwine.

The production was a long-term passion project for Mwine, who balanced the documentary with his acting career in series such as The Chi and The Lincoln Lawyer. Steven Soderbergh joined the project as an executive producer, lending further visibility to the film.

=== Music ===
The film features a soundtrack of African pop music that corresponds to the eras depicted in Kibaate's photographs, using music as a "time-traveling device" to immerse the viewer in the specific decades of Ugandan history.

== Release ==
Memories of Love Returned began its festival run in 2024 and continued into 2025. It screened at major international festivals including:

- Slamdance Film Festival
- New York African Film Festival
- Zanzibar International Film Festival
- Pan African Film Festival (PAFF)
- Silicon Valley African Film Festival (SVAFF)
- Africa International Film Festival (AFRIFF)
- Mashariki African Film Festival

== Reception ==
=== Critical Response ===
The film received positive reviews for its lyrical storytelling and its celebration of "mundane" African life. Critics praised Mwine for avoiding "poverty porn" and instead focusing on moments of love, style, and community resilience.

Afrocritik described the film as a "reclamation," noting that it transforms from a simple archival project into a complex narrative about the burden and beauty of preserving history. The review highlighted how Mwine honors the truth Kibaate gathered in secret, calling the film an "intricate exploration of legacy, memory, and a complicated web of personal histories."

=== Accolades ===
Year	Award	Category	Result	Ref.
2025	Zanzibar International Film Festival	Best Documentary	Won	
2025	Pan African Film Festival	Best Feature Documentary	Won	
2025	Mashariki African Film Festival	Best Documentary	Won	
2025	Silicon Valley African Film Festival	Best Documentary Feature	Won	
2025	Africa International Film Festival	Best International Documentary	Won	
