= Villains (Heroes) =

- Heroes episode
- Episode no.: Season 3 Episode 8
- Directed by: Allan Arkush
- Written by: Rob Fresco
- Production code: 308
- Original air date: November 10, 2008

Guest appearances
- Kristen Bell as Elle Bishop; Jessalyn Gilsig as Meredith Gordon; Jimmy Jean-Louis as the Haitian; Blake Shields as Flint Gordon, Jr.; Ntare Mwine as Usutu; Ron Perkins as Dr. Livitz; Eric Roberts as Eric Thompson; Robert Forster as Arthur Petrelli; Malcolm McDowell as Daniel Linderman; Franc Ross as Daniel Pine; Jeff Staron as Trevor Zeitlan

Episode chronology
← Previous "Eris Quod Sum"	Next → "It's Coming"
- Heroes season 3

"Villains" is the eighth episode of the third season of the NBC superhero drama series Heroes and forty-second episode overall. Instead of the usual title screen with the show's name it uses a similar screen, replacing the word "Heroes" with the episode's name.

== Plot ==
Hiro's drug-induced vision quest sends him back 18 months to the Petrelli parents' anniversary party. Nathan is still an Assistant District Attorney, Peter is a hospice nurse, and Linderman is in the house conspiring with Arthur to stop Nathan's investigation. Arthur confirms that if he cannot be stopped, he will be killed. Arthur does try to convince Nathan to give up the Linderman case, but fails - leading to the car accident seen in Six Months Ago, when Nathan's wife Heidi was paralyzed.

Later, Angela overhears Arthur and Linderman lament their failed murder attempt. As she panics and threatens Arthur, he places the thought in her head that Nathan has to die. Linderman, however, is more remorseful, and offers to heal Angela's scars from the many times Arthur has forced thoughts into her head. Remembering Arthur's plans to murder Nathan, she uses the Haitian to dampen Arthur's abilities, and poisons his food at dinner. Before they can dispose of the body, Nathan arrives and calls for an ambulance. At the hospital, a doctor tells Angela and Nathan that Arthur is dead, and Angela immediately orders a cremation. It is soon revealed, however, that the doctor was working for Arthur. The doctor announces to Arthur that he will be permanently paralyzed.

In another vision, Hiro is transported to Memphis one year ago, where Claire's biological mother Meredith and her brother, who is revealed to be level 5 escapee Flint, are robbing a convenience store. They are soon interrupted by Company Agent Thompson. Meredith allows Flint to escape, getting herself captured in the process. However, rather than being a prisoner, Thompson offers her the chance to become a Company Agent. She agrees, and they are soon on their first mission, which is successful, with her help.

Back at the company, Meredith learns that Flint was also captured by an "invisible man". He also proudly proclaims that he is going to be an agent too, and the siblings will be able to work together. Understanding that the company is just using them, Meredith breaks Flint out of prison to flee the country together. Thompson follows them, and tries to recapture them in a train car filled with gas canisters. Meredith explodes the car, allowing Flint to escape, as well as causing a massive train wreck.

Thompson asks why Meredith hates the company, and she explains that her daughter died as she tried to escape them. Knowing that Claire is in fact still alive, he lets her go. Claire is then seen rushing into the train wreck to save a man, revealing it to be the same train wreck from the episode Genesis.

In Hiro's third vision, he sees the history of Sylar. After killing his first victim in Six Months Ago, Gabriel Gray is trying to hang himself. Elle shows up in the nick of time to save him, using her ability to break the noose. Unfortunately for Gabriel, she's not there by accident - she's on orders from Noah to spy on him and install hidden cameras in his apartment, as the Company wants to understand Gabriel's rare ability to transfer powers from one vessel to another.

Elle returns to Gabriel's apartment later with pie, and begins to flirt with him, keeping her ability a secret. He reveals his stolen power of telekinesis, and explains that there are others like him, showing her some of the names he got from Chandra Suresh's map. Gabriel also tells her of his hunger for powers. Elle begins to develop real feelings for him, and requests that the Company move on, saying he's no longer a killer. But Bennet still wants to see Gabriel use his ability, so makes Elle introduce Sylar to Trevor Zeitlan, who can make items explode by pointing at them.

Elle repeatedly calls Trevor's ability special, until Gabriel gets jealous and throws Trevor against a wall. Elle tries to stop him with her power, but only makes Gabriel angrier in his discovery that she had lied to him. He demands that she leave, and proceeds to kill Trevor by slicing open his head. Elle is furious that they forced Gabriel to become a killer when they could have saved him, but Noah brushes it off as nothing, as they were only following orders. He then gets into Mohinder's cab, in another scene from Genesis.

In the present, Hiro wakes up and realizes they must warn Angela about Arthur's survival. He begins to hear screams and he and Ando exit the hut. He is quickly stopped, however, as he finds the decapitated body of Usutu lying on the ground. He continues to move forward, finding the head. He turns to find Arthur Petrelli, who proceeds to exclaim, "I understand you've been dreaming about me." and lays his hands on Hiro's head, causing him to scream, as Ando looks on in horror.

== Critical reception ==
Josh Modell of The A.V. Club rated this episode a C+. He described the episode as a "breezy hour of revolutions" that resulted in him being "mildly entertained". Similarly, Robert Canning of IGN gave the episode 6.3 out of 10, criticising the lack of character development, concluding that "[this] was another misguided episode from a season that has become more famous for its flaws than anything else".
