= Elle Bishop =

Fictional character on the NBC science fiction drama series Heroes

- Heroes character
- Kristen Bell as Elle Bishop
- First appearance: "Fight or Flight"; October 22, 2007
- Last appearance: "The Eclipse: Part 2"; December 1, 2008
- Created by: Tim Kring
- Portrayed by: Kristen Bell

In-universe information
- Full name: Eleanor Zoe Bishop
- Alias: Cindy
- Nickname: Fulgora
- Species: Evolved human
- Occupation: Company agent
- Family: Bob Bishop (father)
- Ability: Electrokinesis

Elle Bishop is a fictional character who appeared on the American superhero drama series Heroes, which aired on NBC from 2006 to 2010. The character was created by series creator Tim Kring and portrayed by actress Kristen Bell. Elle was created by Kring to act as a contrast to the rest of the characters, who had all recently found out they had abilities, whereas Elle had known her whole life. Bell, who had previously starred in the then recently cancelled series Veronica Mars, was a fan of the series and had met up with the writers that informed her they would love to have her on the show. While the character of Elle was created before Bell was cast, following her casting, the character was slightly altered to better resemble her. Elle was one of the new characters introduced in the second season and according to contract, would continue on the series for at least 13 episodes into season 3.

Elle is introduced in the episode "Fight or Flight" as an agent of the Company, an organization whose primary purpose is to identify, monitor and study those individuals with special abilities. The daughter of Company head Bob Bishop, she possesses the power to generate and manipulate electricity. Elle is portrayed as mentally unstable, which is attributed to extensive "testing" condoned by her father to research her abilities when she was young. During the third season, Elle's powers grow out of control but with Sylar's help she regains control of them and begins a relationship with him. After finding out that Elle played a role in his transformation into a "monster", Sylar killed her and stole her abilities.

Critical reception towards both the character and Bell's performance has been positive. Praise was directed towards Elle's personality as well as her characterization and abilities. Her death in the third season was heavily criticized by reviewers and fans. Bell was nominated for both a Saturn Award and a Teen Choice Award for her performance.

== Development ==
=== Concept and creation ===
In 2007, following the cancellation of Veronica Mars, actress Kristen Bell had voiced interest in appearing on Heroes because she was a fan. In July 2007, during a train ride back from San Diego Comic-Con with Heroes actors Zachary Quinto and Masi Oka, and writers from the series, the writers had mentioned that if Bell "ever want[ed] to come on Heroes, give us [writers] a call", to which Bell said she would love to. Announced in August 2007, Bell was to portray Elle, a "mysterious young lady" with an "awesome power" for a total of thirteen episodes.

Heroes creator Tim Kring and the writers had created the character of Elle with the idea that she was a "cautionary tale" of what could happen if the other characters had known of their abilities for the duration of their lives as Elle did. Kring pitched Bell the idea for the character "which she loved" and soon they were "off and running." The casting of Bell, as Kring explains, "was not easy to pull off," but because of the large ensemble cast of the series and multiple story arcs, "we found a way to jump into a small window in [Bell’s] schedule." Elle was only meant to be Bob's stepdaughter and Meredith Gordon's daughter, making her Claire Bennet's sister, however this idea was dropped due to "lack of storyline and plot holes".

The character Elle was created long before Bell was cast; however, Kring noted "when you do cast an actor ... you try to tailor that character a little closer to who the actor is. So it's hard to know when one starts to influence the other".

=== Characterization ===
When Kristen Bell was cast, she noted that with Elle it would be "unclear whether she's good or bad". In "Four Months Ago...", Elle admits to being diagnosed as a sociopath and previous to that, she had displayed sadistic behavior as a result of testing done to her as a child. Bell explains, "Bodies are not able to take that much electricity and pain, and so Elle's psychologically a little off her rocker." She is able to kill without apparent remorse, although in one instance, she reacts defensively when Mohinder asks her how many have died by her hand.

During an interview with The Scifi World, Tim Kring described Elle as "a little off", and Bell added that Elle is "a little messed up in the head" and a highly conflicted individual who does not have the ability to decipher between right and wrong. Because of that, Bell explains that Elle comes off as more of a victim. Bell also explains that Elle is one of the few characters with abilities that embrace their power and is almost on the verge of being addicted to her ability. Elle "enjoys the emotional power it gives her over other people". She is described as one who is "always out to get what she wants" and someone who "doesn’t have many boundaries". Bell describes Elle as a vixen who "feels like she has a romantic connection to everybody", and in a few episodes, Elle is shown displaying a great deal of affection to men and flirting with both Peter Petrelli and Mohinder Suresh.

Bell noted the similarities between Elle and the character Claire Bennet, saying that they "relate to each other" and "are two sides of the same coin" because, while Elle's father sanctioned testing on her, supposedly causing her mental instability, Noah kept Claire hidden, preventing Claire from experiencing the same childhood that "really messed [Elle] up". Bell has said in interviews that in later episodes of Heroes, "You'll find out that Elle holds the key to Claire's future" and that Elle has "a [present] with Peter and a past with Claire's dad and a future with Claire".

=== Powers and abilities ===
Elle has the ability to generate and manipulate electricity, discharging and directing it as electrical arcs. She has been shown being able to weld a lock, blast objects, knock people unconscious, and even kill a man. She is not entirely immune to the electricity she produces, however, as shown when she is drenched in water and attempts to create electricity—she gives herself an electric shock, causing great pain.

Elle has endured a series of testing by the Company during her childhood that measured the extent of her power. Bob had stated that Elle was in a "different league" when comparing her to Claire. When inquiring about her abilities, Elle was able to learn from Noah Bennet that the Company had wanted to record the extent of her abilities (whether she could power a flashlight, a street lamp, or an entire city block) and Bob had often prompted to continue the tests further, even after Elle had passed out.

Her ability is shown to respond to her emotions. After Bob's death, mourning Elle loses control over her ability and her body starts to produce electricity at any time (Sum Quod Sum graphic novels); this makes Elle unable to stay close to electrical devices such as computers and even a plane. She claims to live in constant pain (Eris Quod Sum). This ends when Sylar helps her forgive herself (It's Coming).

== Appearances ==
=== Heroes ===
==== Generations ====
Elle's first chronological appearance is in "Four Months Ago...". During this time, the Company made Peter Petrelli their willing prisoner and in those months he was held, Elle seems to have developed a cute crush on him. Peter confesses that he likes the little jolts which Elle gives him as a tease and kisses her. She confides in Peter that she has lived in the Company's holding facility for 16 years. She also admits to being diagnosed as a sociopath; she explains at age six, she accidentally set her grandmother's house on fire and, at age eight, caused a major blackout in Ohio. She also says that she spent her ninth birthday in a glass room with an IV of lithium in her arm. She also explains that she has never been on a date and has never been swimming. When he escapes from the facility, Elle is upset and angry to the point that she blasts Peter, setting him ablaze during his escape. She then chases after Adam Monroe while the Haitian goes after Peter.

Elle first appears in the episode "Fight or Flight" searching for Peter in Ireland. Peter has no recollection of his past and is staying with the owner of Wandering Rocks Pub, Ricky. Elle questions Rick about Peter's whereabouts and when he pretends not to know Peter, she kills him with a large bolt of electricity on her way out the door. Later on, during a telephone conversation with Bob Bishop, her father and Company head, she dismisses the murder as trivial and insists she can find Peter. However, she is pulled off the assignment, much to her frustration.

In "Cautionary Tales", Elle comes back to the United States. Former Company employee Noah Bennet captures Elle for collateral, as Bob had captured his daughter, Claire. He ties Elle's hands to a chair and ties her bare feet together and puts them in a metal dog bath which is full with water. Elle tries to use her abilities while in the dog bath, but she shocks herself. During this time, Noah tells Elle that Bob allowed the Company to perform tests on her which had begun as early as the age of seven. This included subjecting her to high doses of electricity, which scarred her emotionally for life. Elle has no recollection of the tests, and Noah suggests the Haitian had a role in causing Elle to forget her experiences. After an agreement is made, she is reunited with Bob and Claire momentarily reunited with Noah. However, Elle attacks Claire and West as they leave. She tries to attack Noah, but he shoots Elle in the arm before she can hurt him or anyone else. As it seems Noah is going to kill Bob, Mohinder Suresh, a scientist working with Noah and the Company, shoots and kills Noah. Elle leaves with Bob and Mohinder, giving Bob a look of distrust.

In the episode "Truth & Consequences", Bob chastises Elle for allowing West and Claire to escape. He then assigns Elle to perform surveillance on Claire and her family as they prepare to leave town. Claire, however, spots Elle from a distance, leading to a physical confrontation, which leads Claire to threaten to expose the Company

Elle's last appearance in season two is in "Powerless". Her father reprimands her for her mistakes; to redeem herself, she attempts to re-capture the now powerless Sylar for the Company. She uses her ability to confront Sylar in Mohinder's research lab, but Sylar is armed with a gun and shoots at Elle. Sylar manages to slip away, leaving Elle unharmed. She comes out somewhat defeated, but is informed by Mohinder that if not for her arrival, Sylar would have killed him, Maya Herrera and Molly Walker. He says the three of them owe her their lives, to which she replies, "Cool".

The episode marked Bell's previously expressed interest in performing in scenes with the character Sylar, as she and Zachary Quinto had been good friends for almost ten years. Bell had said that she "would love to see him and Elle face off one day". In November 2007, Bell and Quinto filmed scenes at a restaurant in Los Angeles, which was set as a "New Jersey Diner" and had involved police and paramedics. The filmed scenes are part of the untold stories which are a special feature of the season 2 DVD set.

==== Villains ====
Returning in the episode, "The Butterfly Effect", following her failure to stop Sylar, Elle seeks assistance from Noah Bennet. He is detained in Level 5, a high security ward for the Company's most dangerous prisoners. However, Sylar is already there, having killed her father. He attempts to take her ability, but the pain of being scalped causes her to involuntarily release a massive electrical surge. This knocks Sylar out, but also disables security for the entire facility, allowing the prisoners to escape. Elle is later fired by Angela Petrelli, the new head of the Company, who tells Elle that the only reason the Company kept her was because of her father's influence.

In the episode "Eris Quod Sum", Elle makes her way to Claire's house to seek help from Noah, having lost control of her ability. She attacks Claire out of anger, but is subdued when Lyle throws water on her. She is told that an organization called Pinehearst could help her with her condition, so Claire agrees to escort her there. They reach Pinehearst just in time to see Peter Petrelli thrown from a seventh story window. Claire takes him away from the building, but Elle refuses to leave after learning from Peter that they can take her powers away.

In the episode "Villains", Elle's life a year earlier is explored, revealing that she had been partnered with Noah Bennet at one point. The two are assigned to watch Sylar (still Gabriel Gray) in order to discover how he transfers abilities. Elle saves Gabriel after he attempts to kill himself out of guilt for killing his first victim. She is told to befriend him, and Gabriel develops an attraction to her that suppresses his hunger. Using a list of people with abilities Gabriel had compiled, Noah arranges to introduce Gabriel to one of them to see his power in action. However, Elle does not agree with the plan, revealing she has developed feelings for Gabriel. She reluctantly goes along with it when Noah threatens to fire her. They then introduce Gabriel to Trevor, an evolved human with a kinetic projection ability. Her repeated references to Trevor being "special" anger Gabriel, and he orders her to leave while he kills Trevor. Elle is left with guilt as she caused an event that helped to create "Sylar".

In the following episode, "It's Coming", set in the present, Arthur Petrelli, head of Pinehearst, arranges for Sylar to speak with Elle. His aim is to have Sylar use his latent empathic abilities to take powers, rather than doing so through killing. Elle is chained to the floor in a metal room, still in pain from her ability. She repeatedly attacks him, furious at Sylar for her father's murder, eventually begging him to kill her so that her pain will go away. He forgives her for turning him into a monster and convinces her to forgive herself for her crimes, wanting to take away her pain without killing her. At that moment, Elle's pain disappears and she regains control of her ability. Likewise, Sylar is able to absorb her power. The two appear to rekindle their old feelings for each other as Elle teaches Sylar how to use her ability.

In "The Eclipse Part I", she and Sylar are sent to retrieve Claire who is revealed to be the catalyst, the unknown part of the formula that would allow someone to produce abilities. On assignment, Elle challenges Sylar and he shows her that he can still be a killer, and not just a "daddy's boy" by killing a rental car assistant. Eventually, they find Claire and Noah, and a fight ensues, however, Elle and Sylar find themselves powerless; the result of the eclipse. Elle aims a gun at Noah but Claire jumps in and takes the bullet. Noah knocks Elle out and dislocates Sylar's arm, while he escapes with injured Claire. After awakening, Sylar explains to a shocked Elle that losing his abilities is a bit of a relief. She tells him that they can't just take what they want anymore, then Sylar retorts and grabs Elle, kissing her passionately. Outside, Noah aims a rifle at them.

In "The Eclipse Part II", Sylar and Elle sleep together but then are confronted by Noah. Elle is shot in the thigh in the ensuing struggle. Both Elle and Sylar flee while Noah follows Elle's blood trail to a grocery store. There, Elle and Sylar plan to ambush Noah in the rear of the store. Sylar pushes Elle into a cargo elevator, in an attempt to hide her from Noah. Elle watches as Noah slits Sylar's throat with a box cutter. When the eclipse ends, their abilities are returned and Sylar is revived. He and Elle go to the Bennet residence and overcome Noah and Claire while holding Claire's mother, Sandra, hostage. Suddenly, Hiro teleports in and takes both Sylar and Elle to Costa Verde beach, leaving them there before disappearing. Sylar and Elle kiss, and he explains that he and Elle are "damaged goods" and that they will "never change". Sylar then begins to slice Elle's skull open.

In the following episode "Our Father", Sylar, covered in Elle's blood, is shown pouring lighter fluid on Elle's body. He painfully says, "Goodbye Elle," then sets her ablaze with the electric ability he inherited from her.

==== Redemption ====
In the episode "Tabula Rasa", Elle is seen in flashbacks as Sylar witnesses his real memories reflecting in the Hall of Mirrors.

In "The Art of Deception", Matt reverts Sylar's memories of his kills, including the ones of Elle.

=== Literature ===
Elle helps to hunt down Echo DeMille.

Elle also appears in the Heroes webcomics. Her appearances in the online series occur before her introduction on the television series. Elle's first webcomic appearance is in "Elle's First Assignment, Part 1", which reveals her first assignment for the Company. Elle monitors Claire Bennet, posing as a student at Union Wells High School. After following Claire home, Elle ends up confronting Eden McCain. The incident is broken up by Noah Bennet, who informs Elle that he doesn't "want [Elle] hanging around [his] daughter any more". In Part 2, she finds out about the tape of Claire testing her power and tries to take it from Zach. She is stopped by the Haitian and Mr Bennet, who find out about the tape as well. Elle also appears in "The Man With Too Much Brains" to recruit the original webcomic character Matt Neuenberg to the Company. She also was teamed up with Thompson Jr. to capture Donna Dunlap, a woman with enhanced vision in "Donna's Big Date, Part 1", and she was among the agents that try to capture Echo DeMille at Lake Arrowhead, where he managed to convert Elle's electricity into soundwaves, in "Going Postal". She is also referred in "Faces, Part 1" to have helped Thompson Jr. and Penny Logan taking down The Croatian.

In "Sum Quod Sum", it is revealed that she has lost control of her ability since leaving the Company, so she has gone to London to find help from Claude. After she tracks him down, he confronts her but then runs away. It begins raining, and Elle decides to take advantage of it. She releases an electrical charge, which travels through the water on the ground and into Claude, but she, too, is knocked unconscious in the process. Claude and his friends, Abigail and Lee, carry her to his place and he begins to show Elle the source of her problem. Things get ugly when Elle accidentally shocks Abigail, which leads them to fight each other; Abigail's force field redirects Elle's lightning towards Lee, so Elle stops and then is asked to leave the place. Although Claude asks her to stay, she prefers to look for the help of Noah, so she goes to Costa Verde and attacks Lyle while waiting for his father.

In "From the Files of Primatech: 1991", the childhood's background of Elle is further explained: how she started a blackout in Athens, Ohio that took out three other counties. Elle's mother sent her to her father, Bob, to New York City to deal with her. Bob asked the help of Charles Deveaux, who recommended taking a fatherly approach, but ended up taking Dr. Zimmerman's advice: treat Elle as any other posthuman and test her abilities. During one of these tests, Bob tried to calm the weeping Elle turning her drinking straw into gold, but this backfired as it allowed Elle to accidentally shock her father. After this, Elle escaped and Bob enlisted Noah Bennet to go after her. Noah eventually found Elle at an arcade and anticipating her attack, he wore latex gloves. Elle quickly electrified a machine making it toss balls at Noah, so she could escape. When Noah followed Elle through a mini-golf course, she electrified a mini-windmill, making it throw blades at Noah. Finally, Elle was cornered; Noah promised her Bob would be proud if she came back with him. Once back at Primatech, Bob locked Elle up while discussing the situation with Kaito and Noah. Angela brought a young Haitian to mind-wipe Elle to forget what just happened and enjoy her 9th birthday cake.

== Reception ==
Bell's performance was highly anticipated as she had gained popularly within her starring show, Veronica Mars. Ultimately, Bell's performance was critically praised, along with the character of Elle, who became very popular among viewers. Elle was ranked #44 on IGN's "Top 50 Chicks Behaving Badly".

With the cancellation of Veronica Mars, Variety reported that attaining Bell was a "major, major coup for NBC" because of how in-demand the actress was. Universal Media Studios' Katherine Pope noted that "many studios [were] chasing [Bell] in both film and TV" and that Pope was happy that Bell "chose to star in our show." When Bell was cast, Tim Kring explained that because she had known several of the cast members for years as well as some of the writers, it "was already like part of the family by the time we cast her."

In an interview with Bell, Eric Goldman of IGN commented on Bell's "eagerly awaited debut" on the series. Matt Roush of TV Guide reported on Bell becoming a series regular on Heroes, and stated he "like[s] her more and more, especially as we see the tragic dimension of how Elle has been so cruelly used by her 'daddy,' Bob, and is much more than the flirty assassin we first met." Bruce Fretts, also of TV Guide, said that Bell's portrayal of Elle was responsible for "sparking Heroes to life." He explains that "[i]n just a few scenes... [Bell is able to] juice up the slumping sophomore drama" and her "live-wire performance turned Chapter 5 into this season's strongest episode yet." However, because of the large ensemble cast, Matthew Gilbert of Slate.com commented that Season Two of Heroes was "even more overpopulated than the last, expanding from a rabble to a veritable global riot of Dubiously Gifted Ones."

Her death in the season three episode "The Eclipse Part II" was criticized by media outlets with E! writing that the show offered "the redemption of electric Elle, an Elle-Sylar romance, an Elle-Claire friendship, HRG mentoring Elle [only to take] it all away". According to Kring, the character was killed due to Bell leaving the show to appear in films.

=== Accolades ===
In 2009, Bell was nominated a Saturn Award for Best Guest Starring Role on Television and a Teen Choice Award for Choice TV Actress Action.
