= I Am Become Death =

- Heroes episode
- Episode no.: Season 3 Episode 4
- Directed by: David Von Ancken
- Written by: Aron Eli Coleite
- Production code: 304
- Original air date: October 6, 2008

Guest appearances
- David Anders as Adam Monroe; Jimmy Jean-Louis as the Haitian; Jamie Hector as Knox; Brea Grant as Daphne Millbrook; Ntore Guma Mbaho Mwine as Usutu; Adair Tishler as Molly Walker; Ronald Guttman as Dr. Zimmerman; Malcolm McDowell as Daniel Linderman; Thomas Robinson as Noah

Episode chronology
← Previous "One of Us, One of Them"	Next → "Angels and Monsters"
- Heroes season 3

"I Am Become Death" is the fourth episode of the third season of the NBC superhero drama series Heroes and the thirty-eighth episode overall. It was written by Aron Eli Coleite and directed by David Von Ancken. The episode originally aired on October 6, 2008. The title is a reference to a phrase from the Bhagavad Gita and was famously quoted by J. Robert Oppenheimer; "Now I am become Death, the destroyer of worlds."

== Plot ==
Peter travels four years into the future with his future self, where they discover that Kaito's formula is being used to administer adrenal power enhancements to ordinary people, some of whom are unable or unwilling to control their abilities. Future Peter tells Present Peter that Sylar can help to fix the problematic future. The Claire of this future assassinates Future Peter.

Peter finds that a friendly Sylar has reassumed his former identity of Gabriel Gray, and is now raising his young son, Noah, in Claire's former home. Gabriel teaches Peter his power. Future Claire, Knox and Daphne show up to kill Peter. Gabriel beats Knox into submission and loses control of his radiation ability. Peter tries in vain to stop Gabriel before he explodes, reducing Costa Verde to nuclear waste. Claire takes Peter back to the base.

Nathan, who in this future is the President and married to Tracy, offers Peter the opportunity to read his mind to see if he's sincere. Peter stops short of cutting Nathan's head open and teleports back to the present Level 5, where Sylar confirms that he is Peter's brother.

In the present, Tracy attempts to commit suicide by jumping off a bridge. Nathan flies in and saves her.

Throughout the episode, Mohinder is researching a possible cure for the powers he's given himself.

Hiro and Ando finally resolve their differences. They try to escape through a vent and are caught by the Haitian. Angela Petrelli mentions that Hiro's father would have been disappointed with him for losing both portions of the formula and mentions that he already has "the key" to restoring the formula. The scene switches to Hiro and Ando in a graveyard, digging up Adam Monroe who, upon seeing Hiro, lunges at him.

== Reception ==
The episode was given a score of D+ by The A.V. Club reviewer Noel Murray.

Robert Canning of IGN gave the episode 7.6 out of 10.
