= Sendhil Ramamurthy =

American actor (born 1974)

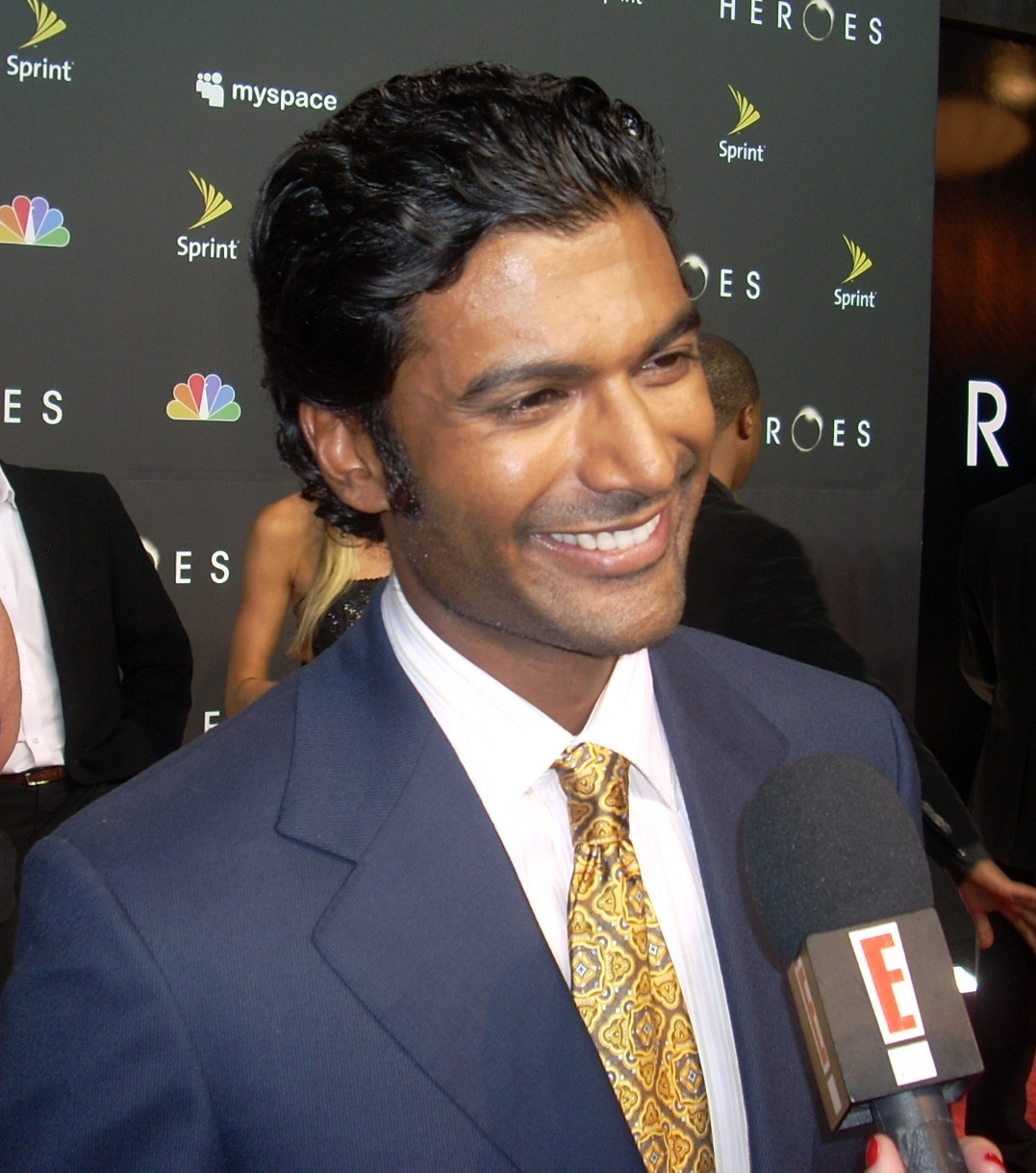
- Ramamurthy in 2008
- Born: May 17, 1974 (age 52); Chicago, Illinois, U.S.
- Education: Tufts University (BS); Webber Douglas Academy of Dramatic Art (GrDip)
- Occupation: Actor
- Years active: 1998–present
- Spouse: Olga Sosnovska (m. 1999)
- Children: 2
- Relatives: Jay Chandrasekhar (cousin)

Sendhil Amithab Ramamurthy (born May 17, 1974) is an American actor. He is best known for his roles as geneticist Mohinder Suresh in the NBC sci-fi drama Heroes (2006–2010), Jai Wilcox in Covert Affairs (2010–2012), Gabriel "Gabe" Lowan in Beauty and the Beast (2013–2014), and Mohan in Never Have I Ever (2020).

== Early life and education ==
Ramamurthy was born in Chicago to a family who emigrated from India; his father is a Kannadiga and his mother is Tamil. He grew up speaking English and some Kannada. His parents are physicians. He has one sister who is also a physician. He and his sister were raised in San Antonio. There, he went to Keystone School and graduated in 1991.

Ramamurthy attended Tufts University initially as a pre-med major to follow in his parents' footsteps. He was also a member of the Kappa Charge of Theta Delta Chi. He became interested in acting when he took an "Intro to Acting" class during his junior year as part of his graduation requirement. After participating in several plays, including Our Country's Good, he chose to change career goals. He graduated with a bachelor's degree in history and then attended the Webber Douglas Academy of Dramatic Art in London in 1996, graduating in 1998.

== Career ==
Ramamurthy has appeared in theatrical productions of A Servant of Two Masters in London's West End, Indian Ink at the Soho Repertory Theatre, and East Is East at the Manhattan Theatre Club. His film credits include Love & Debate (originally titled Thanks to Gravity), Orient Express, Blind Dating, Little India, Shor in the City and Gurinder Chadha's comedy film It's a Wonderful Afterlife. In addition, he has appeared on several TV shows, including Ellen, Casualty, Guiding Light, Grey's Anatomy, Ultimate Force, CSI: Miami, Heroes, Covert Affairs and Numb3rs.

He made a conscious decision to not audition for stereotypical Indian roles, although he has been offered such parts. Ramamurthy's role on Heroes was his biggest to date. Although the character of Mohinder Suresh was originally written for a 55-year-old, his audition tape and screen test were convincing enough for writers to rewrite the part for Ramamurthy. Ramamurthy starred in all four seasons of Heroes, although his appearance in the final season was limited; had the series been recommissioned for a fifth season, he would not have returned for it.

In 2000, he appeared in NBC's television biblical miniseries In the Beginning in the role of Adam.

Ramamurthy guest starred in a season four episode of Psych titled "Bollywood Homicide", directed by his cousin Jay Chandrasekhar.

Ramamurthy joined the cast of the USA Network show Covert Affairs as Jai Wilcox from the second episode onward, replacing character Conrad Sheehan III, played by Eric Lively in the pilot. The show premiered in July 2010. In the season 3 premiere, his character was killed off.

Ramamurthy appeared in the eighth and ninth season of The Office as Kelly Kapoor's new boyfriend, Ravi.

On December 19, 2012, it was announced that he would appear in the CW show Beauty & the Beast as Gabriel Lowen, an assistant district attorney.

In 2015, he reprised his role as Dr Mohinder Suresh in the Heroes series's continuation entitled Heroes: Reborn.

He appeared as the main villain in the sixth season of the television series The Flash as Dr. Ramsey Rosso/Bloodwork. He reprised his role in the season nine episode "It's My Party and I'll Die If I Want To"

As of 2020, he is part of the cast of the Netflix series Never Have I Ever, playing Mohan Vishwakumar, the main character's father. The series is produced by Mindy Kaling, who had first worked with Ramamurthy when she was a writer and actor on The Office.

In 2022, Ramamurthy appeared in season four of Doom Patrol as Mister 104.

== Personal life ==
In 1999, Ramamurthy married actress Olga Sosnovska. They have two children, a daughter and a son, born in 2005 and 2008 respectively. He and his family previously lived in London and have since moved to New York.

Comedian and film director Jay Chandrasekhar is his cousin.

== Filmography ==
=== Film ===
| Year | Title | Role | Languages | Notes | Ref(s) |
|---|---|---|---|---|---|
| 2000 | In the Beginning | Adam | English | | |
| 2000 | Death, Deceit & Destiny Aboard the Orient Express | Nikki | English | | |
| 2006 | Blind Dating | Arvind | English | | |
| 2009 | The Slammin' Salmon | Marlon Specter | English | | |
| 2010 | It's a Wonderful Afterlife | DS Raj Murthy | English | | |
| 2011 | Shor in the City | Abhay | Hindi | | |
| 2013 | The Lifeguard | Raj | English | | |
| 2016 | Lego Jurassic World: The Indominus Escape | Simon Masrani | English | Voice | |
| 2018 | After Everything | David | English | | |
| 2024 | Do Aur Do Pyaar | Vikram Sehgal | Hindi | | |

=== Television ===
| Year | Title | Role | Notes | Ref(s) |
|---|---|---|---|---|
| 2002 | Guiding Light | Lloyd | | |
| 2002 | Ultimate Force | Corporal Alex Leonard | Main role (season one) | |
| 2005 | Grey's Anatomy | Intern #2 | Pilot episode | |
| 2005 | Numb3rs | DOE Specialist | Episode: "Dirty Bomb" | |
| 2006–2010 | Heroes | Mohinder Suresh | Main role | |
| 2009 | Psych | Rajesh | Episode: Bollywood Homicide | |
| 2010–2012 | Covert Affairs | Jai Wilcox | | |
| 2012–2013 | CSI: Miami | Raj Andari | | |
| 2012–2013 | The Office | Ravi | 3 episodes | |
| 2013–2014 | Beauty & the Beast | Gabriel Lowen | Main role (seasons 1–2) | |
| 2015 | Heroes Reborn | Mohinder Suresh | Guest | |
| 2016 | Stan Lee's Lucky Man | Nikhail Julian / Golding | | |
| 2016 | Family Guy | Unknown | Voice, episode: "Road to India" | |
| 2016 | Odd Mom Out | Bruce | Episode: "Hanoi Jill" | |
| 2016 | Elementary | Ajit Dalal | Episode: "Ill Tidings" | |
| 2018 | Reverie | Paul Hammond | Main role | |
| 2018 | MacGyver | Samir | Episode: "Matty + Ethan + Fidelity" | |
| 2018 | New Amsterdam | Dr. Panthaki | Recurring role | |
| 2019–2020, 2023 | The Flash | Ramsey Rosso / Bloodwork | Recurring role; 10 episodes | |
| 2020–present | Cleopatra in Space | Khensu, King Ptolemy, Assassin Mech | Voice, recurring role | |
| 2020 | Never Have I Ever | Mohan Vishwakumar | Recurring role; 20 episodes | |
| 2020 | DC Super Hero Girls | Ra's al Ghul | Voice, episode: "#LeagueOfShadows" | |
| 2022 | Good Sam | Asher Pyne | Recurring role | |
| 2022 | Mira, Royal Detective | Deepak | Voice, episode: "Mikku and Chikku's Hometown Mystery" | |
| 2022–2023 | Doom Patrol | Rama / Mister 104 | Recurring role; 7 episodes | |
| 2023 | The Legend of Vox Machina | Saundor | Voice, episode: "The Echo Tree" | |
| 2025 | Goosebumps | Dr. Avi Pamani | 2 episodes | |
| 2025 | Jurassic World: Chaos Theory | Professor Chuck Desai / Dr. Samuelson | Voice | |
| 2025 | The Couple Next Door | Leo Pandian | 6 episodes | |
| 2026 | One Piece | Nefertari Cobra | Episode: "Nami Deerest" | |
