= Mohinder Suresh =

Fictional character in Heroes series

- Heroes character
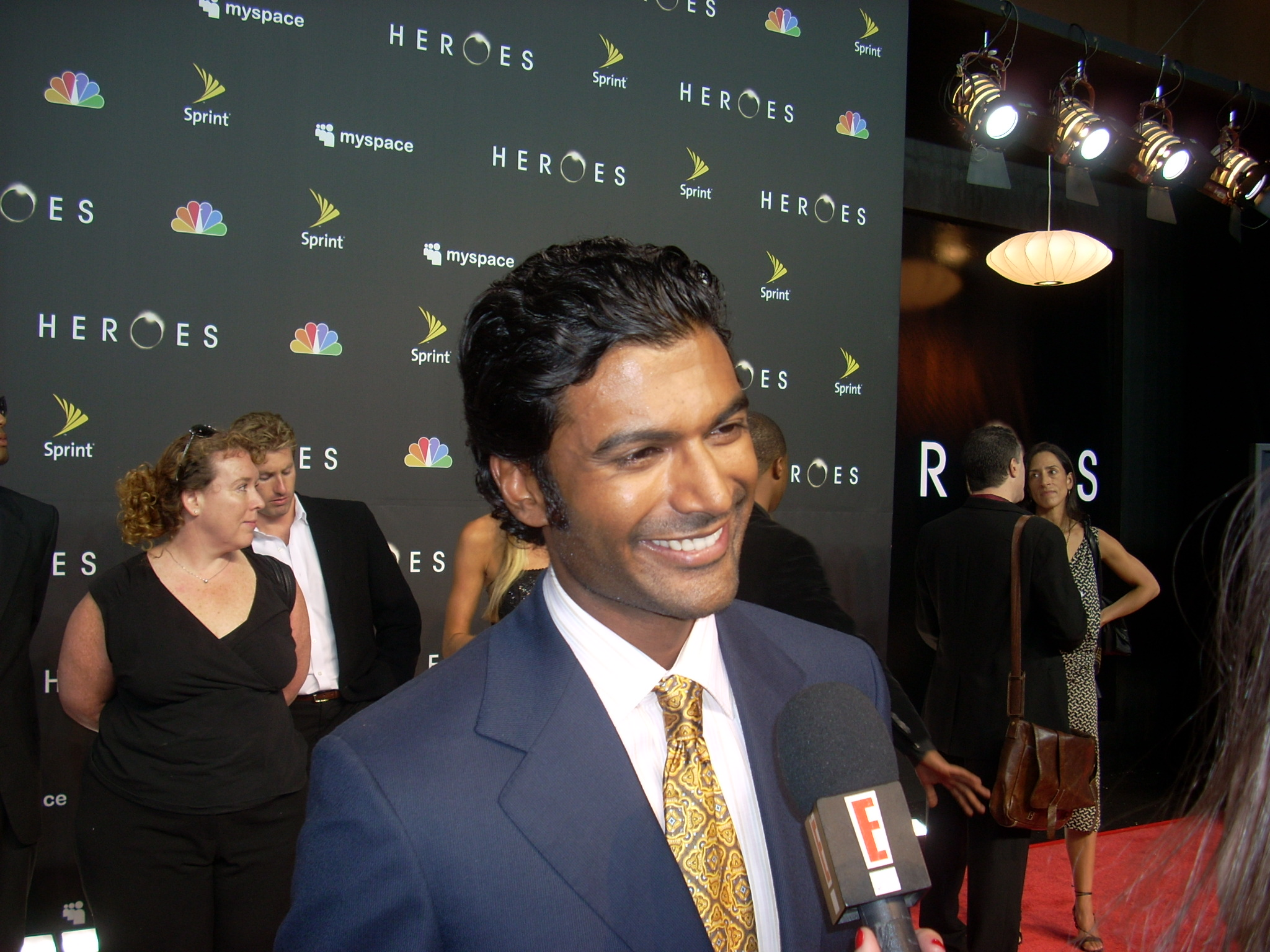
- Sendhil Ramamurthy portrayed Mohinder Suresh in the TV series Heroes
- First appearance: "Genesis"; Heroes; September 25, 2006
- Last appearance: "Send in the Clones"; Heroes Reborn; January 7, 2016
- Created by: Tim Kring
- Portrayed by: Sendhil Ramamurthy

In-universe information
- Occupation: Geneticist; taxi driver
- Ability: Enhanced strength, agility and reflexes

Mohinder Suresh is a fictional character on the NBC drama Heroes who is portrayed by actor Sendhil Ramamurthy. He is from Chennai, Tamil Nadu, India and is a genetics professor at the University of Madras. Mohinder is attempting to find the truth behind the sudden death of his father, Chandra Suresh (Erick Avari), and to continue his father's research of finding "superhuman" beings on Earth. In character, Suresh also provides many episodes with opening or closing dialogue, general philosophical musings in relation to the events that occur during the episode.

The role of Mohinder was written to be a 55-year-old geneticist looking for super-powered humans. However, Ramamurthy's audition was so convincing that the main character part was rewritten for a younger geneticist following in his father's footsteps. The concept of the older geneticist was rewritten into Chandra.

== Character history ==
=== Genesis ===
After hearing news of his father's death in New York, Mohinder suspects that his father was murdered to silence the findings of his genetics research.

Mohinder travels to Brooklyn, where he rents his father's apartment. Although it is in disarray, much of the material is discovered and Mohinder begins to reorganize it. To makes ends meet during his lengthy stay, Mohinder takes a job as a taxi driver, eventually picking up a passenger named Peter Petrelli, who asks him about "being special." Although Mohinder is slow to realize what Peter means, he eventually talks to him about genetics and evolution. Afterward, Mohinder gets another passenger, Mr. Bennet. He begins to ask Mohinder personal questions, referencing personal details such as his teaching position in India. Startled, Mohinder abandons the cab and runs away.

In the second episode, Mohinder discovers that his father had compiled a program to find the "special people."

Mohinder finds a man in his father's apartment who claims he is an exterminator, but Mohinder quickly realizes that the man is planting an eavesdropping device. The man pulls a gun, and after a struggle that leads out into the apartment hallway, a girl picks up the gun asking, "If you're the exterminator, why do you have a gun holster?", prompting the man to quickly leave. The girl, Eden McCain, introduces herself as a friend of Mohinder's father and expresses enthusiasm about his theories on genetics.

Mohinder and Eden discover a portable hard drive in his father's pet's cage. The hard drive appears to have all the genetic research that his father had done on tracking those with special abilities.

Mohinder also learns that his father seems to have had a falling out with a man named Sylar. Chandra believes Sylar to be "Patient Zero." According to Eden, via a recorded telephone message, Chandra seems to want nothing to do with the strange man.

Mohinder soon accidentally uncovers a small book hidden in a compartment. As he and Eden thumb through the leather notebook, they discover a list of names, apparently of people all across the globe that possess "abilities." The name "Sylar" pops up and they discover his New York address. They also find a key in the book.

They make their way to his apartment. They knock, but there's no answer. Mohinder produces the key from the book that doesn't fit. Unable to gain access, he pulls out a screwdriver and picks the lock. Both enter a very neat kitchen with a teacup resting on the table. Mohinder takes pictures.

Mohinder tracks down Nathan Petrelli to question him about whether he might be one of the "special people" his father was researching. Nathan, who is busy running in a congressional election, does not listen to Mohinder but tells Peter about him. Peter then makes the connection between Mohinder and his father's book and then visits Mohinder's apartment. Because Peter cannot demonstrate any powers without another "special person" being there for him to mimic, they set out to visit Isaac, who Peter says can paint the future. Unfortunately, Isaac is strung out on heroin and refuses to open the door.

On the subway ride back, time suddenly freezes for everyone but Peter, who meets a future version of Hiro. When time unfreezes in "Hiros," Peter tells Mohinder about the encounter, but Mohinder is now convinced that Peter is crazy. Mohinder makes a decision: he will return to Madras with his father's ashes. Peter tries to convince him otherwise but to no avail.

In "Seven Minutes to Midnight," Mohinder returns to India to scatter his father's ashes. He debates whether to return to his job as a college professor. Mohinder talks with his mother about her decision to let his father go to the United States to look for people with superhuman abilities. She tells him for the first time about his sister, Shanti, who died when she was five and Mohinder was two. Shanti was "special", according to her mother, and their father loved her so much that he was afraid Mohinder would find his love for his son wanting in comparison. Mohinder also has a series of prophetic dreams, depicting a young Indian boy who guides him to various scenes showing his parents arguing and showing his father's murder. Mohinder later finds a file with a photo of the boy, named Sanjog Iyer, in his father's office.

In the episode "Homecoming," Mohinder locates Sanjog playing soccer and questions him about his visions. The young boy tells Mohinder that troubled people seek him out in their dreams, not the other way around. Sanjog also tells Mohinder that he already has the answers he seeks. Mohinder then decides to continue his father's research and accesses his father's computer files, using the password "Shanti". The files contain the names of all of the people with superpowers that Chandra Suresh had located. Mohinder tells his mother that he plans to return to New York, and that he wants to seek out people with special powers to tell them of their abilities.

Upon returning to New York, Mohinder began preparations to warn the people on Chandra Suresh's list of Sylar, as a number of those on the list had already been killed by the telekinetic serial killer. Shortly after, he received a phone call from Eden. She was going to explain everything after she "made things right" by killing Sylar, who she knew killed Chandra Suresh.

Two weeks later, Mohinder learns of Eden's suicide. An officer comes by to talk with Eden's former neighbors. He asks Mohinder if he knew a woman named Sarah Ellis, to which he replies that she was on the list, he had tried unsuccessfully to locate her in LA, and had never met her before. The officer then shows him a picture of a woman identified as Sarah Ellis and Mohinder tells him that he knew her by a different name: Eden McCain.

Later, Mr. Bennet appears at the apartment. Bennet wants Mohinder's help in finding people with abilities and "making a difference." When Mohinder refuses, Bennet asks if Mohinder is on the list, a question he sidesteps with no answer. Mohinder says he isn't interested in helping Bennet, but Bennet leaves his card anyway.

Nathan Petrelli approaches Mohinder who quickly apologizes for coming off as "a raving lunatic" when they first met. Nathan has come to Mohinder in an attempt to help his brother, Peter Petrelli. They begin talking, and Nathan explains that Peter is afraid of causing an explosion. Mohinder, in turn, explains Peter's unique, "sponge"-like superpowers to Nathan. Mohinder also states that he may be able to help with Peter's condition if he is able to test Peter. However, Nathan is reluctant to let Mohinder come into contact with Peter, fearing that Mohinder will "feed into [Peter's] paranoia." Still, Mohinder insists, and they leave to find Peter. When they find Peter at his apartment, he "has no time to be [Mohinder's] guinea pig." Recently, Mohinder has called many of those found on his father's list. To his discouragement, no one believed him until he received a return call from Zane Taylor. He went to meet with Zane and get a DNA sample, but, unknown to him, encountered Sylar at Zane's residence. Sylar, posing as Zane, teamed up with Mohinder, claiming that he could help.

Mohinder, who has known for some time that Sylar was posing as Zane, drugs him when they return to Mohinder's apartment. He straps Sylar to a chair and hooks him up to an I.V., filled with curare, a liquid that prevents Sylar from using his powers. Mohinder almost shoots Sylar, but Sylar persuades him not to do it. Mohinder realizes that he needs Sylar alive for a few more minutes so he can continue his research. Sylar breaks free and tells Mohinder that he had stopped the I.V. long ago, and that Mohinder did not notice because he was so involved in his research. At the end of the episode, Peter finds a bloodied Mohinder pinned to the ceiling. Mohinder is just barely able to reveal that Sylar is standing behind Peter before Peter is attacked.

As Peter and Sylar fight, Mohinder is released from the ceiling. He manages to ram the map into Sylar, knocking him out and taking out the body of Peter but not before taking the List as well. He later takes the body to the Petrelli's mansion. Later on, Thompson arrives at Mohinder's apartment to convince him to work with Primatech, offering him vast resources to do research but Mohinder is more concerned with stopping Sylar. Thompson says they both have the same interests and asks him to join forces. Then Thompson tells him of Molly Walker and her sickness and power. Mohinder goes immediately to see her. Mohinder learns that she can stop Sylar by tracking him, but needs to cure her sickness of nerve deterioration. Mohinder discovers that his sister, Shanti, had the same illness and died of it, and that his father had found a cure for it without telling anyone. Mohinder researches and discovers that by giving Molly his own functioning antibodies, it will restore her humoral immune response.

Later, Noah Bennet and Matt Parkman come into the building. Molly tells Mohinder that Matt is there. Through the surveillance camera, they see Mr. Bennet and Parkman approaching the room. Bennet wants to kill Molly to protect Claire, but Mohinder will not let him. Matt Parkman ceases the potential gunfire and Mohinder escapes the building with Molly, Micah Sanders, Niki Sanders, and D.L. Hawkins.

=== Generations ===
Four months after the incident in New York, Mohinder has been giving speeches about superhumans and a fatal virus that affects only these special beings. At one of his speeches in Cairo, he is approached by a mysterious man named Bob, who offers him a job at The Company. Mohinder accepts the offer; he and Noah Bennet are planning to take down The Company from the inside, and his speeches had just been bait.

Mohinder is assigned to find the Haitian by the Company. He travels to Port-au-Prince in Haiti where he finds the Haitian and cures him of the Shanti virus. Mohinder later tells the Haitian to meet with Noah Bennet, to join the crusade to take down the Company. After his trip to Haiti, Mohinder returns to his apartments, where he and Matt Parkman have become adoptive fathers to Molly Walker. Mohinder informs Parkman that he will be working in New York for a while trying to take down the Company.

Parkman finds a picture of the Original 12, one of which was his father. He asks Molly Walker to find him using her ability, but Molly is reluctant and afraid to find Parkman's father, because he is the nightmare man in Molly's dream. Mohinder doesn't support Matt, but Molly agrees with terrible results. Molly is able to find Parkman's father, Maury, but this leaves Molly in a dream induced coma. While discussing Molly with Bob at the Company, Mohinder is issued a stun gun and new assignment. While addressing the details of the assignment, Niki Sanders enters the room and attacks Bob. Mohinder is able to stop her with the stun gun, which he initially did not want to use. Mohinder later is seen next to Niki, who has been strapped to a bed in the Company facility. Mohinder, once Bob leaves the room, attempts to free Niki, however, she doesn't want to leave, believing that the Company will help her.

Mohinder makes his way to New Orleans and begins to do research on a new hero named Monica Dawson. Moral issues begin to arise with Mohinder as he is asked to inject a modified version of the Shanti virus to Monica, in the hopes that this modified version would strip Monica of her powers without killing her, as the normal Shanti Virus does. Mohinder's morality causes him not to inject the virus into Monica and go against Bob. Bob initially accepts Mohinder's stand on the issue and tells Mohinder he will be issued a partner to help keep everyone in line. The partner ends up being a more healthy-looking Niki. Bob reveals to Mohinder that they are experimenting with the virus in order to stop a man named Adam Monroe, who is killing original members of the Company.

After Noah Bennet confronts Mohinder about the painting depicting him with a Company-issue gun and a broken nose, Mohinder explains that he hasn't been given one. When Maury Parkman attacks the Company and corrupts Niki Sanders, his nose is broken by her. After she injects herself with the modified virus, which Mohinder cannot cure, Bob suggests tracking down Claire Bennet, whose ability might be able to produce a viable cure. He is then given the gun seen in the photo by Bob. He betrays Noah to Bob; his priorities having changed with the introduction of the incurable virus.

Mohinder revives Bennet using Claire's blood, explaining that such acts are what the Company does. He leaves Bennet locked in a holding cell. Using Claire's blood to reinforce the antibodies in his blood, he then derives a cure for the new strain of the virus and prepares to leave for New Orleans to deliver it to Niki Sanders. However, while making his way to the airport, Sylar calls and tells him that he has Molly Walker.

Sylar forces Mohinder to help heal his strain of virus that is preventing him from using his powers. Mohinder takes Sylar and the others to Isaac Mendez's loft. After Maya is shot by Sylar, Mohinder proves to Sylar that he can cure the virus by bringing Maya back from the dead using the blood he took from Claire. However, as Mohinder is about to inject Sylar with a transfusion of blood, Elle Bishop intercedes. Elle shocks Sylar in the back, but he manages to escape, taking the last transfusion of blood with him.

=== Villains ===
In the third season, Mohinder is able to isolate the source of powers (located in the adrenal glands) from Maya and injects himself with a formula he creates based on that. The formula imbues him with increased strength, agility, balance, athletic ability, and heightened senses. However, because the formula is incomplete, his body begins to mutate, developing bug-like attributes which begin with lesions on his back and shoulders. His fingers also begin to secrete a sticky, web-like substance.

Mohinder finds that he is unable to develop a cure for either his condition or Maya's power, though he lies about it to Maya. Unable to control his aggression, he breaks up a fight with a neighboring couple and brutally beats the man's head against the wall. When the man comes looking for payback later on, Mohinder overpowers him and pulls him into the lab, encasing him in a cocoon made from the substance his fingers secrete. He does the same to several others, going so far as to kidnap a drug dealer from a park and drag his body back to his loft. When Maya discovers this and calls him a monster, he cocoons her as well.

When Mohinder learns that Nathan Petrelli and Tracy Strauss were artificially given abilities, he detains them in an effort to cure himself. While the couple is unconscious, he has an encounter with Daphne Millbrook, who invites him to join Pinehearst. She leaves abruptly after discovering all the victims hidden in the back of his lab. Once Tracy comes to her senses, she manages to free herself and Nathan. Mohinder decides against fighting them, instead grabbing Maya and fleeing to Pinehearst.

In order to cure himself, Mohinder begins working with the formula stolen by Daphne. Peter's description of Mohinder's future self only strengthens his resolve to perfect the formula. He also discovers that many of the abilities he has documented first manifested during the solar eclipse nearly a year ago, although he initially believes this to be a mere coincidence until the next solar eclipse removes his powers. Upon returning him to normal, Mohinder's tries to visit Maya, but the eclipse ends before he can speak with her, so he doesn't go through with it. His research hits a wall when it is revealed that the formula needs a special catalyst (which can't be artificially produced) to grant abilities without inducing violent mutation.

Mohinder tries to take the formula to stop his progressing mutations. He is thwarted by a combination of Daphne stealing the vial in his hand and Peter, Flint, and Knox destroying his lab at Pinehearst. In the process, however, they knock over a large vat of the formula, which Mohinder is exposed to, causing the lesions from the first flawed formula to disappear. The highly-flammable formula is then ignited by Flint, blowing up the lab. Mohinder survives, apparently suffering only minor injuries, and is picked up on the road by Tracy Strauss.

=== Fugitives ===
Mohinder is ambushed by Nathan's agents. While trying to escape capture, Mohinder is seemingly rescued by Noah Bennet. After Noah asks him a series of questions, his true alliance is revealed when he surrenders Mohinder to Nathan's agents. Later, Mohinder is drugged and put on a plane with other people with abilities.

After the plane crashes, he and Matt save Hiro from being recaptured by soldiers. The three of them run and stop at a trailer when Matt starts drawing pictures of the future. While Matt is drawing, Mohinder suggests to Hiro that he surrender himself and tells Nathan and his men that he is now powerless so that he can live a normal life. Mohinder and Hiro run after Matt, after he realizes that Daphne is in danger and heads back to the crash site. When Daphne is killed and Claire uses herself as a shield after being discovered by Nathan's soldiers, Mohinder, Hiro, Matt, and Ando escape and meet up with Peter.

Mohinder, along with Peter and Matt, drug and kidnap Noah. It is then revealed, through Matt reading Noah's memories, that Noah warned Mohinder about the government program. A fight with Matt ensues and in order to allow Matt time to verify Noah's claim that Daphne is still alive, Mohinder goes out to fight the approaching government agents. He is then captured, and Nathan tells him that if he doesn't help him find a "cure" for abilities, he'd let Daphne die.

Later, Tracy escapes with the help of 'Rebel' and "rescues" Mohinder, Matt, and Daphne. Mohinder and Matt take Daphne to the hospital for treatment. He is there to comfort Matt when Daphne passes away. Mohinder tries to convince Matt not to take revenge on Danko, but ultimately fails. Mohinder then returns to his apartment to collect some of his possessions, but learns that everything has been confiscated by Danko and his men except some papers that belonged to his father. From these papers Mohinder learns about "Coyote Sands" and eventually goes there to learn what his father did there.

In "1961", he is at "Coyote Sands" where he knocks down Noah during the sandstorm and takes him to a cabin fearing that HLS was on his tail; Noah then informs him about the fate of the relocation center. After searching through the debris, he learns that his father worked on evolved humans, including some of the founding members of the Company, there from Angela Petrelli. When Angela goes missing, he helps in the search for her. Later, Peter and Mohinder find Angela and protect her from her sister, Alice; she mistakes Mohinder with his father and sends a bolt of lightning at him. When everyone is about to leave, Mohinder tells Peter that he can't come because he still hasn't forgiven himself and stays alone in "Coyote Sands".

Mohinder is rescued after being abducted, from Building 26 along with the rest of the evolved humans by Hiro and Ando and at their insistence examines Hiro to determine why his powers are causing him headaches and nosebleeds. Mohinder determines that Hiro's body is rejecting his powers and he can't risk stopping time anymore.

=== Redemption ===
Other than a few brief mentions by other characters (including Peter revealing he replicated Mohinder's power in order to be stronger so he could save more lives), Mohinder was absent until the episode "Once Upon a Time in Texas," where it was revealed that he was presumably killed during an event Samuel was involved in, eight weeks prior. Samuel enlists the help of Hiro to undo what he refers to as a mistake.

In "Brother's Keeper," Mohinder is shown to be living with Mira in Madras and working as a professor, but his father's files and films about Project Icarus lure him once more into his research, driving Mira away. Mohinder builds a compass and follows it to the "Sullivan Bros. Carnival", where he meets Joseph, and discusses with him about Samuel's power, unknowing he was eavesdropping them. After understanding the danger Samuel would become, he decides to burn the film and return to India, but Samuel finds him and tries to make him speak, finally killing him in his motel room. Hiro fixes Samuel's mistake by saving the film, but also saves Mohinder's life, thus changing the timeline. Hiro then teleports Mohinder away and hides him under a false name in a mental hospital in Florida in order to keep him out of sight for eight weeks.

In "Close to You," a brain-addled Hiro launches a rescue mission for him. Hiro teleports them to Noah Bennet's apartment, interrupting Noah and Lauren Gilmore kissing and Hiro asks for Noah and Lauren to help the three. Mohinder helps Noah building a new compass to lead him to Samuel, stating only an evolved human can activate it, suggesting Noah use Ando. He then leaves for India.

In the graphic novel "Second Chances," Mohinder has returned to India back to Mira, but he found a messy apartment, understanding she is in trouble. He asks the help of Molly, who found Mira being held hostage by a man interested in Mohinder's research. Mohinder rushes into the rescue, taking everyone down with his enhanced strength, and saving Mira. They then kiss.

=== Heroes Reborn ===
After gathering thousands of people for the Odessa Peace Summit on June 13, 2014, the Summit is bombed, and Mohinder is branded a terrorist.

Mohinder meets Angela Petrelli shortly before the Summit and it is revealed that he has been working in the Arctic and has uncovered proof of a coming extinction-level event, something they refer to as the Healing. Angela has had visions of it as well and informs Mohinder that Erica Kravid, who is funding Mohinder's research, is planning to only save those she cares about and has destroyed his research and killed his team. While Mohinder plans to reveal the truth at the Summit, Angela warns him that Erica will preempt his efforts and kill him. Mohinder refuses to believe Angela due to her past actions, but grows worried after he can't reach his team. To this end, he leaves a copy of his research with Molly Walker in case something happens to him. As Angela warned him, Erica does stop his speech and has Harris tranquilize and take him to the stadium garage to kill him. Harris blocks Mohinder's powers with a drug similar to the Building 26 drug, but Mohinder is rescued by a future Hiro Nakamura. A short time later, Harris' bombing destroys the Summit, leaving Mohinder's fate unclear.

The real Mohinder is revealed to have apparently died in the bombing while Erica Kravid uses a shapeshifter to record a video by "Mohinder" stating that he did the bombing for evo supremacy. Erica also blames the murders of Mohinder's team on Mohinder himself. Molly later has Nathan teleport her to India so she can tell Mohinder's mother the truth about his death. Micah broadcasts a video to the world showing a shapeshifter being coached by Erica in making the video, exposing Erica's lies and clearing Mohinder's name.

Mohinder hits Emile Danko with the cab's door ("A Clear and Present Danger").

== Alternate timelines ==
- In the alternate future of "Five Years Gone," in which New York City is destroyed by a nuclear explosion, Mohinder is working as Chief Medical Advisor to Nathan Petrelli, who has been elected President of the United States and is actually Sylar impersonating Petrelli. The world has grown fearful of those with special abilities due to "Nathan" blaming the explosion on Sylar to protect his brother Peter, who was the true cause of the bomb. As President, Sylar devises a plan to gradually and systematically eliminate them. He has been using Mohinder's knowledge of their genetic makeup to create a serum which he declares will reverse these genetic anomalies, but in all actuality destroys them (a development which Mohinder staunchly opposes).
- In the alternate future of "I Am Become Death," in which artificial superpowers are publicly available, present-day Peter visits Mohinder's lab in order to question him about Sylar (who has long since resumed his identity of Gabriel Gray). Though Mohinder still occupies the lab, it is trashed and covered in spider webs. Mohinder has apparently mutated into something barely human and shows a strong aversion to light. He wears heavy clothing that obscures all but his hands and stays in the shadows, so his face is not revealed. His hands are covered in sores/scales and his voice is distorted significantly. His stance and movement are also much less human. He tells Peter that when he injected himself with the power, he had the formula "terribly wrong". He refuses to tell Peter where Sylar is, but Peter reads his mind to find out.
- In the original timeline of Redemption, Mohinder was murdered by Samuel Sullivan eight weeks before "Once Upon a Time in Texas" and "Brother's Keeper." He also burned a film from the Coyote Sands Relocation Center, which Samuel Sullivan desperately wanted. Hiro time traveled from the present and retrieved the film, switching it with a fake, but used a Kevlar vest to protect Mohinder from Samuel's attack, so he only seemed dead. Thanks to Hiro's actions, Samuel did believe that Mohinder was dead. Later, Hiro trapped Mohinder in a mental institution so that he won't go after Samuel. In the present time, Hiro and Ando eventually rescue him from there, though he isn't happy with what Hiro did to him.

== Spiritual life ==
The Heroes graphic novel "Monsters" shows that throughout his life, Mohinder has identified both as Hindu like his mother and atheist like his father. When he heard that his father, Chandra Suresh, had died, he wondered if perhaps the goddess Kali had punished him for his lack of faith. During Chandra's ashes immersion at Kanyakumari, however, he was fluently chanting Sanskrit Upanishadic verses as prescribed by ritual. Prior to curing the Haitian, he says he has trouble believing in any God who would let the superhuman virus wreak havoc; however, it was unclear if he actually believed this view or not.
