= Ntare Guma Mbaho Mwine =

American actor (born 1967)

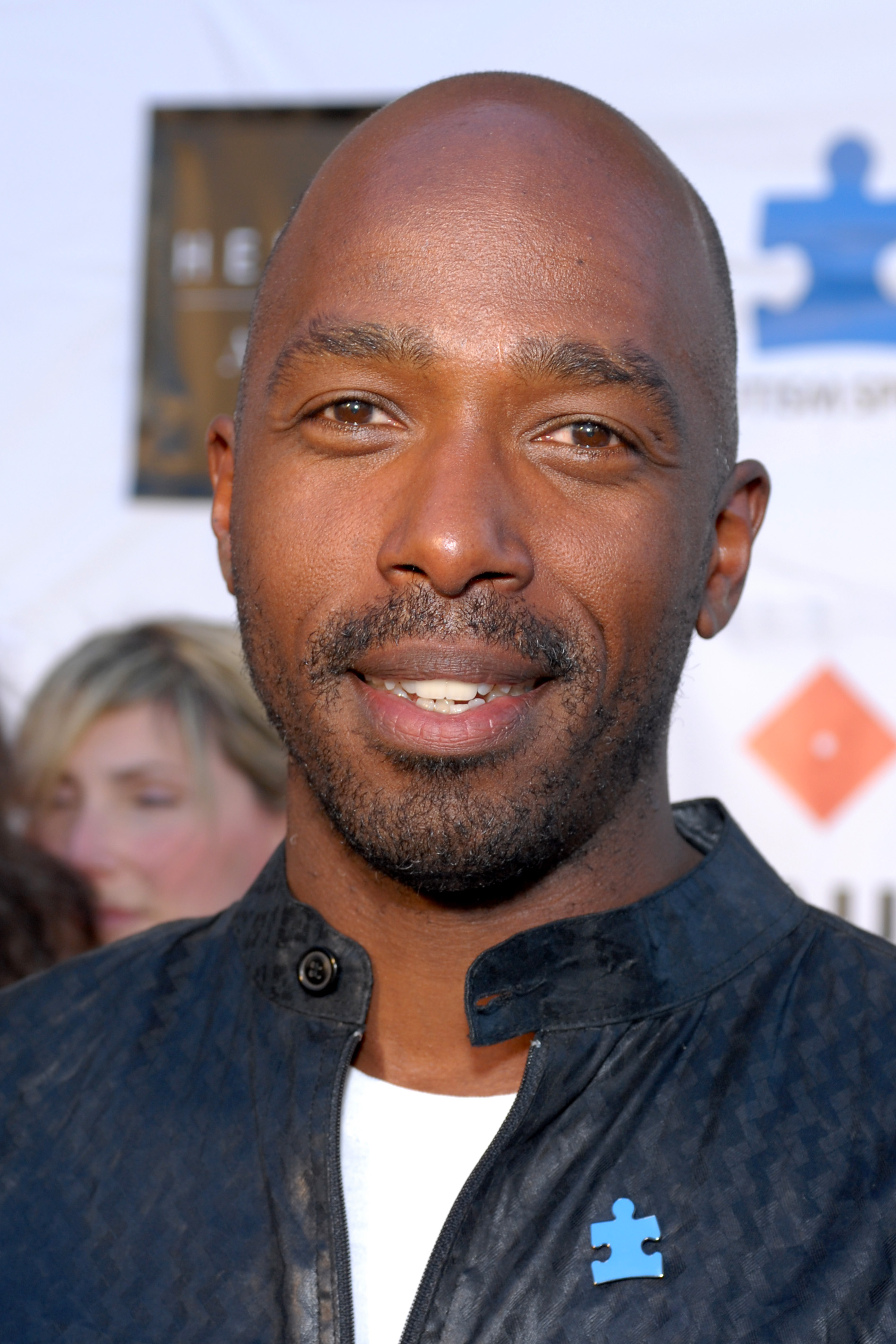
- Mwine in 2009
- Born: Ntare Guma Mbaho Mwine; 1967 (age 58–59); Hanover, New Hampshire, U.S.
- Education: University of Virginia (BA); New York University (MFA)
- Years active: 1981–present
- Website: www.bewareoftime.com

Ntare Guma Mbaho Mwine (born 1967) is an American stage and film actor, playwright, photographer and documentarian. He was credited as Ntare Mwine until 2008, and by his full name thereafter.

== Background ==
Mwine was born in Hanover, New Hampshire to Ugandan parents in 1967. His father was a Harvard Law School-educated attorney. His parents separated when Ntare was 7, with Ntare spending time with his father (who was then working in finance in the United States, including a period at the World Bank in Washington D.C.) and his mother (who went to Kenya to teach psychology at the University of Nairobi).

Mwine earned a master's degree in Fine Arts from New York University's Graduate Acting Program at the Tisch School of the Arts, graduating in 1992. He also studied at the University of Virginia, the Moscow Arts Theatre, and the Royal National Theatre in London. Basing himself in Los Angeles, Mwine's first professional job was the role of Paul in the 1992 U.S. National Tour of Six Degrees of Separation, for which he received an NAACP Image Award nomination for Best Actor.

Mwine is also a fervent advocate on such subjects as LGBTQ rights and HIV/AIDS eradication explaining: "I'm an artist. [I] have to tell stories".

In 2019, Mwine delivered the keynote address at the Ugandan North American Association (UNAA) convention in Chicago, Illinois.

== Television and film ==
Mwine has appeared in movies including Blood Diamond, where he made his film debut. His first appearance in television was in New York Undercover in 1995. Recent appearances include a recurring role as the mysterious Usutu in Heroes. Mwine originally had the role of Joseph in the unaired pilot episode of the show; this part was removed when NBC took on the show full-time, due to the character's plot revolving around terrorist activity. Mwine also appeared as Tom Adler in CSI: Crime Scene Investigation and as Maurice Devereaux in The Riches.

Mwine played a minor, yet recurring, character in HBO and David Simon's television series Treme. The series deals with life in the Tremé district of New Orleans after Hurricane Katrina. In 2018, Mwine featured as Ronnie in the Showtime television series The Chi, which follows residents of the Chicago South Side.

On April 5, 2021, Mwine joined the cast of the Netflix series The Lincoln Lawyer with Manuel Garcia-Rulfo as Mickey Haller. Mwine stars as Detective Raymond Griggs, a character created specifically for the series based on the novel The Brass Verdict.

== Photography ==
Mwine's photographic work has been displayed at the United Nations, The Latino Art Museum in Pomona, California, UCLA's Fowler Museum of Cultural History, and other museums worldwide. It was a central focus of Biro, and prominently featured on Six Feet Under. His photography has also appeared in Vanity Fair.

== Stage ==
Mwine began appearing in stage productions in 1992, appearing as the con man posing as Sidney Poitier's son in Six Degrees of Separation, and in The Riddles Of Race, Circa '68 in 1994, In 1992 and 1997, Mwine was nominated for a Helen Hayes Award for Outstanding Lead Actor in a Non-Resident Production, for his role in Six Degrees of Separation at the National Theatre and Nomathemba at the Kennedy Center in Washington, D.C. He played Julius Van George in Scent of the Roses at the Seattle Contemporary Theatre in 1998.

Mwine's first effort as a playwright, a barestage one-man show entitled Biro, about a HIV-positive Ugandan former rebel soldier who enters the United States illegally for treatment. The play, depicting a 90-minute explanation from the eponymous character to his lawyer about how he came to be in a Texas jail, premiered in early 2003 at Uganda's National Theatre. It later showed at the Joseph Papp Public Theater in New York, as well as in Los Angeles, Seattle, London, and throughout Africa. Mwine performed the work for multiple African heads of state and then-UN Secretary-General Kofi Annan in 2004. The Seattle Post-Intelligencer described his performance as "radiant", particularly so given the dark subject matter.

== Documentary work ==
Based on an article by Bryan Morel Publications, Mwine's inaugural documentary, Beware of Time, was screened at the 2004 Pan African Film Festival in Los Angeles and the Black International Cinema in Berlin. Describing the lives of HIV-positive Ugandans, it was named the Best Film on Matters Relating to Marginalized People, and features a rare interview with Amule Amin, brother of former Ugandan dictator Idi Amin.

Mwine's second documentary, Memories of Love Returned, chronicles the life and work of Kibaate Aloysius Ssalongo, a rural Ugandan photographer whose vast archive documented the town of Mbirizi for over five decades.

== Filmography ==
=== Film ===
Year	Title	Role	Notes
1998	Desert Blue	Agent Green	
2006	Blood Diamond	M'Ed	
2009	40	Godwill	
2010	The Space Between	Cameroon	
2016	Queen of Katwe	Tendo	
2016	Boost	Ramaz 'Ram'	
2017	Del Playa	Professor Appel	
2018	Dirt	Captain Joe Freeman	
2020	Farewell Amor	Walter	
2020	Tazmanian Devil	Julius Ayodele	
2027	Alone at Dawn †		Post-production

=== Television ===
Year	Title	Role	Notes
1995	New York Undercover	Mitnick	Episode: "CAT"
1996	Law & Order	Mark Davies	Episode: "Charm City"
1997	Clover	Gaten's brother-in-law	TV movie
1997	Don King: Only in America	Emissary	TV movie
1998	Brimstone	Detective Clemens	2 episodes
1999	Seven Days	Clifford	Episode: "Vegas Heist"
2000	Perfect Murder, Perfect Town	Det. Everett	Miniseries
2001, 2008	CSI: Crime Scene Investigation	Tom Adler	2 episodes
2002, 2008	ER	Asst. D.A. / Paul Traylor	2 episodes
2005	Alias	Benjamin Masari	Episode: "Bob"
2006	The Unit	Isaias	Episode: "Unannounced"
2006	Sleeper Cell	Yakubu	Episode: "Torture"
2006–2009	Heroes	Joseph Al Amir / Usutu	12 episodes
2008	The Riches	Maurice Devereaux	4 episodes
2010–2013	Treme	Jacques Jhoni	26 episodes
2013	Bones	Joseph Mbarga	Episode: "The Survivor in the Soap"
2013	The Newsroom	Pastor Moses	Episode: "Unintended Consequences"
2014	Perception	ASAC Matthew Jefferies	Episode: "Prologue"
2015	The Knick	D.W. Garrison Carr	3 episodes
2016–2017	Bosch	Craig	2 episodes
2017	Lethal Weapon	Father Darryl Patterson	Episode: "The Seal Is Broken"
2018	Siren	Professor Aldon Decker	Episode: "The Mermaid Discovery"
2018	Madam Secretary	Rashad Badawi	Episode: "My Funny Valentine"
2018	Random Acts of Flyness	Friend 1	Episode: "They Got Some S**t That'll Blow Out Our Back"
2018–2020	The Chi	Ronnie Davis	30 episodes
2020	Shrill	Lucky	Episode: "Wedding"
2020	Room 104	Keir	Episode: "Generations"
2022–2023	The Lincoln Lawyer	Detective Raymond Griggs	10 episodes
2023	Dead Ringers	Silas Jordan	2 episodes
2025	Smoke	Freddy Fasano	Miniseries
2025	Washington Black	Gaius	Post-production
2025	Dexter: Resurrection	Blessing Kamara	Main role

== See also ==
- List of Bishop's College School alumni
- Ugandan Americans
