= Heroes season 4 =

Heroes
- Season 4
- DVD cover
- Starring: Jack Coleman; Greg Grunberg; Ali Larter; Masi Oka; Hayden Panettiere; Adrian Pasdar; Sendhil Ramamurthy; Milo Ventimiglia; James Kyson Lee; Zachary Quinto; Cristine Rose; Robert Knepper
- No. of episodes: 19

Release
- Original network: NBC
- Original release: September 21, 2009 – February 8, 2010

Season chronology
- ← Previous; Season 3

The NBC superhero serial drama series Heroes follows the lives of people across the globe who possess various superhuman powers as they struggle to cope with their everyday lives and prevent foreseen disasters from occurring. The fourth and final season premiered on September 21, 2009, and was released on DVD on July 27, 2010.

On May 14, 2010, NBC cancelled the show after four seasons, although it would return as a 13-episode miniseries in 2015.

== Plot ==
"Redemption" centers on the heroes reckoning with their past. Matt has visions of Syler, who also shows hints of emerging from his body that Matt made look and act like Nathan, on the orders Angela Petrelli. Peter tries to save as many people as a nurse, encountering a file clerk named Emma who can see sound as colours. Claire starts a new chapter at college despite an annoying roommate, while Hiro and Ando try to be heroes only to find very few people are in need of one. Samuel is the leader of a carnival troupe where people with abilities can live off the radar and among themselves, but he has bigger plans, including tracking down the other

== Cast and characters ==
=== Main characters ===
- Hayden Panettiere as Claire Bennet
- Robert Knepper as Samuel Sullivan
- Jack Coleman as Noah Bennet
- Zachary Quinto as Sylar
- Milo Ventimiglia as Peter Petrelli
- Masi Oka as Hiro Nakamura
- Greg Grunberg as Matt Parkman
- Cristine Rose as Angela Petrelli
- Adrian Pasdar as Nathan Petrelli
- James Kyson Lee as Ando Masahashi
- Ali Larter as Tracy Strauss
- Sendhil Ramamurthy as Mohinder Suresh

=== Recurring characters ===
- Dawn Olivieri as Lydia
- Madeline Zima as Gretchen Berg
- Ray Park as Edgar
- Deanne Bray as Emma Coolidge
- Elisabeth Röhm as Lauren Gilmore
- Daryl Crittenden as Chris Bowman
- Jimmy Jean-Louis as The Haitian
- Lisa Lackey as Janice Parkman
- Todd Stashwick as Eli
- David H. Lawrence XVII as Eric Doyle
- Ashley Crow as Sandra Bennet
- Harry Perry as Damien
- Sasha Pieterse as Amanda Strazzulla
- Saemi Nakamura as Kimiko Nakamura
- Carlease Burke as Nurse Hammer
- Sally Champlin as Lynette the Waitress
- Assaf Cohen as Hesam
- Jayma Mays as Charlie Andrews
- Tessa Thompson as Rebecca Taylor
- Jack Wallace as Arnold
- Rick Worthy as Mike
- Kate Vernon as Vanessa Wheeler
- Mark L. Young as Jeremy Greer
- Louise Fletcher as Dr. Coolidge
- Ernie Hudson as Captain Lubbock
- Željko Ivanek as Emile Danko
- Rachel Melvin as Annie
- Swoosie Kurtz as Millie Houston
- Daniel Newman as Jimmy Keppler
- Richard Roundtree as Charles Deveaux
- George Takei as Kaito Nakamura
- Tamlyn Tomita as Ishi Nakamura

== Episodes ==
No. overall	No. in season	Title	Directed by	Written by	Original release date	US viewers (millions)
Volume Five: Redemption
60–61	1–2	"Orientation / "Jump, Push, Fall"	Ed Bianchi & David Straiton	Adam Armus & Kay Foster and Tim Kring	September 21, 2009	5.77
Double-length episode. Claire starts as a freshman in college, but cannot fully leave her old life behind. Peter returns to his job as a paramedic, saving people with the help of Mohinder's abilities. Hiro and Ando have started a "Dial a Hero" business, but Hiro is not in control of his power and believes himself to be dying. Angela is worried about Nathan, who is starting to display Sylar's abilities. Samuel, Lydia and Edgar use their abilities to find other Heroes. Tracy continues to hunt down former Building 26 employees, including Noah and Danko. Sylar's consciousness manifests itself inside Matt's mind.
62	3	"Ink"	Roxann Dawson	Aron Eli Coleite	September 28, 2009	5.82
Samuel attempts to manipulate Peter into filling his brother's position at the carnival. While facing the consequences of this, Peter meets a reluctant new hero. Claire tries to adjust to college life and the revelation of her ability. Sylar uses Matt's ability against him in a bid to return to his body.
63	4	"Acceptance"	Christopher Misiano	Bryan Fuller	October 5, 2009	5.41
Hiro distracts himself by helping others, and in the process learns to accept his own situation. Angela helps Nathan remember his past, but instead uncovers a long-buried secret. Tracy seeks out her old job but wants to do more to help people. Noah begins to drift back to his old life.
64	5	"Hysterical Blindness"	SJ Clarkson	Joe Pokaski	October 12, 2009	5.64
Sylar wakes up with no memories. Claire discovers that there is more to her new roommate than what she already knows. Peter helps Emma to better understand her ability. Samuel seeks out a new member to the carnival family.
65	6	"Tabula Rasa"	Jim Chory	Rob Fresco	October 19, 2009	5.67
Sylar starts his journey to rediscover himself with the help of Samuel. Hiro shows Emma how to accept her ability and the possibilities it brings. Peter enlists Noah's help in finding a healer to save Hiro.
66	7	"Strange Attractors"	Tucker Gates	Juan Carlos Coto	October 26, 2009	5.86
Matt looks for a way to get rid of Sylar after he learns to take control of his body. Noah enlists the help of Tracy in order to help free Jeremy from the police. Claire is concerned that someone wants to eliminate Gretchen during a treasure hunt for their sorority.
67	8	"Once Upon a Time in Texas"	Nate Goodman	Aron Eli Coleite & Aury Wallington	November 2, 2009	6.18
Hiro travels three years into the past to save Charlie's life from the hands of Sylar, only to have things complicated by Samuel's presence. Meanwhile something from Noah's past is revealed.
68	9	"Shadowboxing"	Jim Chory	Misha Green & Joe Pokaski	November 9, 2009	5.35
Though Peter's new ability is helpful in his job, it is trying on him until he uses it to help Emma. Claire learns that the sorority rush attack happened because of something her father did. Sylar's battle to control Matt's body moves into dangerous territory.
69	10	"Brother's Keeper"	Bryan Spicer	Rob Fresco & Mark Verheiden	November 16, 2009	5.07
Mohinder discovered something shocking on an old film reel nine weeks ago. Hiro travels back in time to retrieve that film for Samuel. Tracy begins to lose control of her ability. Nathan and Peter go to Matt, only to discover the truth about Sylar.
70	11	"Thanksgiving"	Seith Mann	Adam Armus & Kay Foster	November 23, 2009	5.17
Three Thanksgiving dinners. The Petrellis: Nathan and Peter confront Angela about the truth with disastrous consequences. The Bennets: a dinner full of drama between Claire and Noah. The Carnival Folk: Hiro travels back in time with Lydia to discover the truth about Joseph's death while Samuel learns of the full potential of his ability.
71	12	"The Fifth Stage"	Kevin Dowling	Tim Kring	November 30, 2009	5.90
Claire travels to the carnival and finds an open invitation. Noah confesses the truth to Lauren about their past relationship. Peter uses the Haitian's ability to get rid of Sylar and bring back Nathan, but must deal with an unexpected choice by Nathan.
72	13	"Upon This Rock"	Ron Underwood	Juan Carlos Coto	January 4, 2010	5.30
Claire searches for answers as she is suspicious of Samuel's true motives. Samuel seeks out Emma in hopes she can help him find someone. Hiro seeks out Ando for his assistance on a new mission but has trouble communicating his intentions.
73	14	"Let It Bleed"	Jeannot Szwarc	Jim Martin	January 4, 2010	4.57
Peter has trouble coping with Nathan's death as Claire tries to console him. Sylar returns to the Carnival to kill Samuel, only to discover something unexpected. Edgar and Noah team up to find a way of bringing down Samuel.
74	15	"Close to You"	Roxann Dawson	Rob Fresco	January 11, 2010	4.71
Hiro and Ando travel to Florida to rescue Mohinder from a mental institution. Noah seeks out Matt to help him with a lead on dealing with Samuel. Peter learns about a horrifying potential future event involving Emma.
75	16	"Pass/Fail"	Michael Nankin	Oliver Grigsby	January 18, 2010	3.93
Hiro falls into a tumor-induced hallucination in which he goes on a trial of his life for changing the past. Sylar confronts Claire in hope that she will help him figure out the truth behind his problems. Samuel tries to woo his old love Vanessa with disastrous consequences.
76	17	"The Art of Deception"	SJ Clarkson	Mark Verheiden & Misha Green	January 25, 2010	4.29
Peter pursues a way of keeping his dream of Emma from coming true. Sylar seeks out Matt in hopes Matt will help remove his powers. Claire tries to negotiate the surrender of Samuel to Noah. Peter enters Sylar's mind.
77	18	"The Wall"	Allan Arkush	Adam Armus & Kay Foster	February 1, 2010	4.40
Peter tries to help Sylar free himself from his own nightmare. Samuel tries to convince Claire to join his family by revealing dark secrets from Noah's past to her. Lauren confronts Samuel at the carnival. Samuel makes preparations for their final "performance" in New York.
78	19	"Brave New World"	Adam Kane	Tim Kring	February 8, 2010	4.41
Samuel's ultimate plan takes effect as Emma is forced into using her abilities to help him kill thousands of people, only to have an unlikely pair of heroes come to her rescue. Noah seeks Claire's forgiveness as they work to escape from their underground prison. Hiro comes to acceptance over his past decisions as he is reunited with his long lost love and seeks to avert disaster. Claire shows the world the truth it may not be ready for.
