= Kinley Cunningham =

American actress

- Born: Kinley Rae Cunningham; December 22, 2010 (age 15); Los Angeles, California, U.S.
- Occupation: Actress
- Years active: 2020–present
- Relatives: Connor Truett Cunningham

Kinley Rae Cunningham (born December 22, 2010) is an American actress and dancer. She is best known for playing Kombucha in the comedy series The Thundermans: Undercover.

== Early life ==
Cunningham was born in Los Angeles, California. In 2018, she began dance training and was making a name for herself on the LA dance scene. In 2020 when she was nine years old, she picked up two national titles. During COVID, her parents realised her potential and started posting her dance moves on Instagram. Her videos gained a huge following and it was then that she decided she wanted to do it all including acting.

== Career ==
Early on in her career, she appeared in the fantasy comedy series The Santa Clauses starring Tim Allen. She also featured in the short film Bliss Talent. She also has had theatre experience, playing in the Lythgoe Family Panto’s production of A Snow White Christmas starring Michelle Williams, Neil Patrick Harris, Garrett Clayton and Olivia Sanabia. Her first break was as a contestant on the competition series Siwas Dance Pop Revolution where she won a spot in the tween girl group XOMG Pop!. Controversy surrounding management of the group resulted in its disbanding and much of its existence has been scrubbed online for undisclosed reasons. Her biggest role so far was playing Kombucha in the comedy series The Thundermans: Undercover.In 2025, she landed a huge Christmas commercial campaign for Walmart playing Cindy Lou Who opposite Walton Goggins as The Grinch.

== Personal life ==
Outside of acting, Cunningham has released a single titled "Heart Beats". Her favorite singer is Taylor Swift and she calls herself a big Swiftie. She is also a fan of Lady Gaga, Dua Lipa, Olivia Rodrigo and Mckenna Grace.

== Filmography ==
=== Film ===
Year	Title	Role	Notes
2021	D.R.E.A.M the Slumber Party	Herself	Video

=== Television ===
Year	Title	Role	Notes
2021	Jimmy Kimmel Live!	Karen Doll	Episode: "Kate Hudson/Dominique Fishback/Evanescence"
2022	This Is Us	Dancer	Episode: "Our Little Island Girl: Part 2"
2022–2023	The Santa Clauses	Dancing Elf	4 episodes
2025	Bliss Talent	Paisley May Michaels	TV series
2025–present	The Thundermans: Undercover	Kombucha	Main role
