= Close to You (Heroes) =

- Heroes episode
- Ando blasts open some emergency exit doors as he and Hiro rescue Dr. Suresh from a mental institution.
- Episode no.: Season 4 Episode 15
- Directed by: Roxann Dawson
- Written by: Rob Fresco
- Production code: 415
- Original air date: January 11, 2010

Guest appearances
- Kate Vernon as Vanessa Wheeler; Deanne Bray as Emma Coolidge; Dawn Olivieri as Lydia; Todd Stashwick as Eli; Lisa Lackey as Janice Parkman; Elisabeth Röhm as Lauren Gilmore; Sasha Pieterse as Amanda Strazzulla

Episode chronology
← Previous "Let It Bleed"	Next → "Pass/Fail"
- Heroes season 4

"Close to You" is the fifteenth episode of the fourth season of the NBC superhero drama series Heroes, and the seventy-third episode overall. The episode aired on January 11, 2010.

== Plot ==
Samuel Sullivan assures Lydia that despite all that's happened lately, she should still believe in him and hold out for his plans to unfold. Despite this, Lydia still secretly remains unconvinced. After a suggestion from her daughter, Lydia decides to call out to someone, one who Joseph Sullivan himself had deemed worthy to replace him. The person in question is revealed to be Peter Petrelli, who awakens from sleep to see the compass tattoo reappear on his arm. Later, Emma Coolidge tests her siren song ability by drawing Peter to her apartment. Peter notices the compass marking on the cello, and learns Samuel had given it to her. Peter takes her to his apartment, and reveals he had met with Samuel, telling her he shouldn't be trusted. Angela Petrelli arrives unexpectedly, who seems to ominously recognize Emma. After Emma leaves, Angela reveals she had a dream about her, saying Emma would be responsible for the deaths of hundreds of people. Peter can hardly believe it and demands to know more, though she refuses. Peter lets his mother leave but not before copying her ability. That night, Peter dreams of Emma at the carnival, sitting in its house of mirrors, where she plays the cello fiercely with a look of anguish. Screams, presumably of people dying, are heard in the background. At this point, Sylar steps in and offering his hand, tells her he can save her. Peter awakens from his dream and visits Emma, where he destroys the cello to stop the dream from coming true. Peter tries to explain, but Emma, shocked by what he did, asks him to leave.

Hiro Nakamura and Ando Masahashi arrive at the psychiatric hospital where Mohinder Suresh has been held since Hiro had put him there. Although Hiro has difficulty explaining, Ando manages to understand why they had come here. Hiro purposefully has himself incarcerated there to locate Mohinder. Ando manages to switch out the medications given to Mohinder that had been keeping him sedated, and the three manage to escape the facility thanks to Ando's and Mohinder's abilities. Realizing they won't be able to outrun the guards, Mohinder suggests Ando use his powers on Hiro as a form of electroshock therapy. The shock restores Hiro's mind, and the three of them quickly teleport away.

Noah Bennet, refusing to ask his daughter for her compass, grows increasingly frustrated with finding a lead on Samuel, straining his relationship with Lauren. Lauren finally does find a lead in the form of Vanessa Wheeler, Samuel's former love, and locates her in California. Annoyed at Noah's obsession to find Samuel, she leaves to have Noah track down Vanessa himself. Noah visits Matt Parkman, who has since been happily living with his family despite being jobless. Despite Noah's earlier request for help resulting in Sylar's mind being trapped in Matt's, Noah manages to convince him to come with him and talk with Vanessa. Matt uses his ability to make her trust them, allowing Vanessa to reveal that she still occasionally meets with Samuel. Noah has Vanessa arrange to meet with Samuel, and plans to catch Samuel when he does. However, the plan goes awry when Eli also shows up with his decoys, allowing Samuel and Vanessa to escape. Despite tracking Vanessa's cell phone, they find that Samuel has managed to move the entire carnival. Matt urges Noah to worry about the problems he can fix, such as his situation with his daughter Claire Bennet, and with that he could then simply ask to borrow her compass to lead them straight to Samuel. Matt returns to his home, deciding that this is simply too big for them, but he is shown that Noah may have convinced him to not be a coward and do what is right. Noah visits Claire briefly to apologize, though she doesn't appear ready yet as she politely tells him she has to leave, but seems willing to in the future as she offers to call him and talk again about everything. Meanwhile, Vanessa is upset that Samuel is holding her at the carnival against her will, though Samuel promises to let her go once he shows her something that he is sure to astound her. Later, Noah returns to his apartment, where he and Lauren make up with a kiss. However, they are soon interrupted by Hiro, Ando, and Mohinder who teleport into the room.

== Critical reception ==
Steve Heisler of The A.V. Club rated this episode a C−.

Robert Canning of IGN gave the episode 6.9 out of 10.
