= Strange Attractors =

- Heroes episode
- Gretchen is attacked by the invisible Rebecca "Becky" Taylor (Tessa Thompson).
- Episode no.: Season 4 Episode 7
- Directed by: Tucker Gates
- Written by: Juan Carlos Coto
- Production code: 407
- Original air date: October 26, 2009

Guest appearances
- Madeline Zima as Gretchen Berg; Dawn Olivieri as Lydia; Raphael Sbarge as Sheriff Werner; Mark L. Young as Jeremy Greer; Lisa Lackey as Janice Parkman; Rick Worthy as Mike; Tessa Thompson as Becky Taylor; Candice Patton as Olivia; Robert Knepper as Samuel Sullivan

Episode chronology
← Previous "Tabula Rasa"	Next → "Once Upon a Time in Texas"
- Heroes season 4

"Strange Attractors" is the seventh episode of the fourth season of the NBC superhero drama series Heroes and sixty-fifth episode overall. The episode aired on October 26, 2009.

== Plot ==
The scene opens with Matt Parkman having sex with his wife Janice. Unbeknownst to Janice, however, Sylar is in control, which Matt realizes later. He is enraged, though Sylar says it's a warning. Matt tells Janice about his problem (without referring to Sylar by name), and urges her to leave with their baby. After leaving a message for Mohinder Suresh, he opens up a beer. He notices Sylar being affected by the alcohol and begins to drink more. As Matt continues to get more drunk, he notices Sylar beginning to disappear. As Sylar completely disappears, Matt's wife and his Alcoholics Anonymous partner walk in. Matt exclaims his triumph before passing out in front of them. Matt wakes up later, with he and his wife embracing and his AA partner telling him they need to start over. As Matt leaves, Sylar reveals that he has taken control over his body. Matt says he'll never get away with it, though Sylar just chuckles. A worried Janice sees him talking to and laughing at no one.

Claire Bennet and Gretchen remain awkward towards each other after their kiss from the past episode. Although Claire wasn't offended, she doesn't want to destroy her chance of having an ordinary life. Suddenly, three hooded figures enter their room. Claire attempts to fight them off, but she and Gretchen soon realize it to be a ritualistic sorority prank after Becky reveals herself. Becky informs them they are being "kidnapped," and Claire, Gretchen, and two other girls are brought to an abandoned slaughterhouse. Becky explains to them that they are to find a big Alpha Chi treasure. The winners get to sit out of hell week. After Becky and her two friends leave, the girls remove their binds and masks. Claire and Gretchen split up with the other girls and begin exploring the desolate building. As they find a teddy bear Gretchen tells Claire she finally "gets her" for wanting to have a normal life and apologizes for putting her on the spot by wanting to start a relationship. Claire admits that she needs Gretchen as a friend. Suddenly a chain wraps around Gretchen's neck and chokes her. Claire tries to save her and hits an invisible Becky with a broken wooden handle. She then gets flung back as Gretchen gets unwound from the chain. Claire is impaled through the chest on rebar sticking out of a wall. She then grabs a hanging hook and cuts Becky across the shoulder. As Becky becomes visible the two other girls walk in. Claire shouts at them to grab Becky, but Becky becomes invisible and rushes between the girls and out the door. The girls then scream as Gretchen pulls Claire off of the rebar. The two girls look at Gretchen and Claire in shock, while Gretchen looks at Claire, whose normal life just came crashing down around her and wonders what to do next.

Jeremy Greer is being held at the local police department for the deaths of his parents. Noah Bennet tries to reason with the town sheriff, that the deaths were clearly accidental (as Noah had made it look like they had died from a leaking gas line), and that Jeremy should be set free. The sheriff refuses to do so until his investigation is complete, and will only release Jeremy to a family member. Noah contacts Tracy Strauss, and explains to her Jeremy's situation. He has Tracy act as Jeremy's aunt, and tells her to talk with Jeremy and sign him out. Tracy explains to Jeremy she too had accidentally killed someone with her powers, hoping he will understand. Later, outside the station, Tracy is confronted by Samuel Sullivan, who tells her he is aware of Jeremy's situation and that he would be safe with them. Tracy wonders what he's talking about, but then finds that she and Samuel have been transported to his carnival. Samuel tells her Jeremy and people like him can have a home here. Tracy demands to be returned, and Samuel has Lydia lead her away, but also hands Tracy a compass in case she needs to "find her way." As she is leaving, Sylar notices her and tells Samuel he recognizes her, though Samuel assures him these memories are not his. Later, Jeremy is convinced to leave the cell, and is escorted out of the jail. However, he is ridiculed outside by angry protesters and reporters. One angry protester grabs Jeremy, causing Jeremy to lose control and begins to drain the man of life. Noah tries to convince Jeremy to heal the man, but Jeremy stops and turns around and returns to the cell. While Noah and Tracy try to convince the sheriff to let them see Jeremy, a police officer takes Jeremy out the back and ties his legs to a chain. The police officer tells him he's not normal and doesn't belong, while Jeremy remains unresisting. The officer then motions to a pick-up truck behind, which begins driving off and pulling the chain. Later, Tracy and Noah find Jeremy's body in the middle of the road. Tracy argues with Noah about letting him down after promising not to. Tracy asks if he thinks they could ever live a normal life, to which Noah realizes they can't. Tracy tells Noah to never call her again and leaves. She then takes out the compass and it stops spinning and points in one direction. Later, an angry Samuel arrives in the small town and uses his powers to demolish the police station before walking away.

== Critical reception ==
Steve Heisler of The A.V. Club rated this episode a D+.

Robert Canning of IGN gave the episode 7.0 out of 10.
