= Tabula Rasa (Heroes) =

- Heroes episode
- Sylar is distraught when his true past plays out before him in the house of mirrors.
- Episode no.: Season 4 Episode 6
- Directed by: Jim Chory
- Written by: Rob Fresco
- Production code: 406
- Original air date: October 19, 2009

Guest appearances
- Robert Knepper as Samuel Sullivan; Ellen Greene as Virginia Gray; Deanne Bray as Emma Coolidge; Ray Park as Edgar; Dawn Olivieri as Lydia; Carlease Burke as Nurse Hammer; Mark L. Young as Jeremy Greer; Ernie Hudson as Captain Lubbock; Edward Gusts as Teddy

Episode chronology
← Previous "Hysterical Blindness"	Next → "Strange Attractors"
- Heroes season 4

"Tabula Rasa" is the sixth episode of the fourth season of the NBC superhero drama series Heroes and sixty-fourth episode overall. The episode aired on October 19, 2009.

== Plot ==
Peter Petrelli brings Hiro Nakamura to the hospital, where Hiro reveals his terminal state due to his brain tumor. Peter decides that perhaps Hiro had come to him to be saved and, after borrowing his power, visits Noah Bennet to see if he knows of anyone that could help. Knowing that Hiro has a tumor, which is living tissue, and that Claire Bennet's regenerative blood will only enlarge the tumor, Noah recalls a boy, Jeremy Greer, whom the company had studied during his time at the Company that had the ability to instantly heal near-death living things. Peter and Noah teleport to his house, where they find Jeremy's parents dead. Noah realizes that Jeremy's power may have changed to be able to take away life as well as give it. They are soon interrupted by Jeremy, who attempts to shoot them. Noah attempts to talk to him, but Peter teleports in and pushes Noah away. Jeremy fires and Peter stops time, but finds he wasn't fast enough as he turns to see his own blood spattering behind him. Peter collapses as time reverts to normal, and Noah convinces Jeremy to heal Peter. Jeremy is able to do so. Having acquired Jeremy's ability, Peter leaves to save Hiro, while Noah calls the police to report the parents' deaths and waits with Jeremy. Peter returns to the hospital but finds Hiro gone, having only left a message: "Save Charlie."

Sylar is still unable to remember anything, and Samuel Sullivan attempts to have him remember. Sylar instead finds himself remembering Nathan Petrelli's memories, and Samuel decides to have Damien return Sylar's true memories. In the house of mirrors, Damien touches Sylar, and he begins recalling everything, including his mother's death. Meanwhile, Samuel invites the police detective who had attempted to arrest Sylar earlier to his circus, in an attempt to bait Sylar into his old ways. Samuel tells Sylar where he his, implying he go kill him, and Sylar finds the detective in the house of mirrors. Sylar tries to tell him to leave, but he involuntarily hits him with his electric powers. The detective manages to get up. At this point, Edgar rushes in and kills the detective. Later, Sylar is welcomed into Samuel's family, with Lydia taking a particular liking to him. Edgar questions what use Sylar will be, but Samuel assures him he will be.

Emma Coolidge is trying to understand her new ability, and asks Hiro how she can get rid of her powers. Hiro tries to convince Emma to embrace them, and invites Emma to a magic show he is putting on for the kids in the hospital. Hiro has her help in a disappearing act, where he stops time. Having touched Hiro, Emma is fascinated by the colors emanating from the applause. Later, Emma asks Hiro how he can stay so focused in the face of death, and Hiro mentions that he knew someone who also was dying but kept a positive attitude. Hiro reveals it to be Charlie Andrews, a waitress in Texas who had been one of Sylar's first victims and was dying from a brain aneurism. Hiro says he intends to save her, as he has been keeping a list to correct all the wrongs he's done. Emma tells him to wait for Peter first. Later, Emma plays the piano as Hiro watches. Emma tells him to head back to his room, but as Hiro turns to leave, he vanishes. Hiro is then shown to have traveled three years back in time, standing outside the diner where Charlie worked.

== Critical reception ==
Steve Heisler of The A.V. Club rated this episode a D+.

Robert Canning of IGN gave the episode 8.0 out of 10.
