= Thanksgiving (Heroes) =

- Heroes episode
- Bennet family Thanksgiving dinner; they are arguing with Claire about her decision to leave school.
- Episode no.: Season 4 Episode 11
- Directed by: Seith Mann
- Written by: Adam Armus and Kay Foster
- Production code: 411
- Original air date: November 23, 2009

Guest appearances
- Ashley Crow as Sandra Bennet; Madeline Zima as Gretchen Berg; Ray Park as Edgar; Dawn Olivieri as Lydia; Elisabeth Röhm as Lauren Gilmore; Hank Stratton as Doug Douglas; Sasha Pieterse as Amanda Strazzulla; Andrew Connolly as Joseph Sullivan; Harry Perry III as Damien

Episode chronology
← Previous "Brother's Keeper"	Next → "The Fifth Stage"
- Heroes season 4

"Thanksgiving" is the eleventh episode of the fourth season of the NBC superhero drama series Heroes and sixty-ninth episode overall. The episode aired on November 23, 2009.

== Plot ==
This episode consists of three Thanksgiving dinners: the Petrellis', the Bennets' and the one at Samuel's carnival.

It's Thanksgiving and Samuel Sullivan is preparing a feast with his family at the carnival. As Samuel watches the film Hiro Nakamura had retrieved for him in the previous episode, he is interrupted by Hiro, who demands to have Charlie Andrews released. Samuel tells him he still has some tasks for him to do, and will eventually release Charlie. Hiro angrily vents to Lydia about Samuel's deception, revealing he had gone to the past to retrieve the film. Lydia and Edgar then wonder why Samuel hadn't sent Hiro back to save Joseph as well, and Lydia asks Hiro to take her back to when Joseph was killed. Shortly after Mohinder Suresh had met with Joseph, Samuel, who had been eavesdropping, angrily confronted his brother about keeping the truth from him. Joseph asserts he is trying to protect Samuel, and tells him he has contacted a government agent to take Samuel in. In a fit of rage, Samuel kills Joseph by impaling him with a rock while Hiro and Lydia watch horrified. Returning to the present, Lydia and Hiro rejoin the others at the dinner table and Lydia informs Edgar of what they saw. Edgar angrily confronts Samuel in front of everyone, though Samuel attempts to accuse Edgar for Joseph's death. As he says this, Hiro notices that Samuel is about to kill Edgar, and he grabs Edgar's arm while stopping time. Edgar wishes to kill Samuel, but Hiro reminds him he needs Samuel alive to know where Charlie is. Hiro promises to put a stop to Samuel, while Edgar flees. Hiro then threatens to leave if Samuel doesn't release Charlie, knowing Samuel needs him. Samuel doesn't seem fazed, however, who then motions for Damien to come over. Touching Hiro's head, Damien causes a series of flashbacks from the past few episodes to appear in Hiro's head. Hiro is left stunned, and afterward Samuel asks him how he feels. Hiro then remarks "Must rescue Watson...Beam me up, Scotty" before vanishing, leaving Samuel shocked as Hiro disappears.

Noah Bennet is preparing a Thanksgiving dinner at his apartment, and has invited Claire Bennet, his ex-wife Sandra and her new boyfriend Doug. While shopping, Noah runs into Lauren, his former partner at the company seen in the past episode, and invites her to come to his Thanksgiving dinner. At dinner, Claire reveals she is thinking of dropping out of college, feeling like she doesn't fit in, and Noah deduces that Claire must be thinking about joining Samuel, who he feels is dangerous. Their arguing escalates, causing Claire to snap and purposefully cut herself when Doug tries to interject. Doug faints after seeing the wound heal, breaking up the dinner. Noah shows Claire his investigation with Samuel, warning her his group is dangerous, while Claire tells Noah to stop treating her like a child. They are then interrupted by a knock at the door, which Noah opens to reveal Gretchen. Gretchen reveals Noah had invited her to come to dinner to cheer Claire up, and the two make up from their past falling out. Claire promises Noah she'll continue with her classes, while Noah and Lauren plan on a movie date. Gretchen prepares to give Claire a ride back to her dorm, but Claire reveals she has taken the compass that Noah had found, and intends to follow it to Samuel.

Angela Petrelli is also attempting to have a Thanksgiving dinner with her sons Peter Petrelli and Nathan Petrelli, though the brothers are more concerned with what she knows about Nathan's death and Sylar. Angela confirms much of what they already know, and also asserts her decision as a mistake, and that they should just live with the outcome and pretend like nothing happened. Nathan begins saying how they will always see him as Sylar, and Angela realizes that Sylar has returned to his body. Nathan then begins exhibiting electrical arcs, and finally reverts to Sylar's form. Sylar uses his telekinesis to force the two to sit at the table while he remarks on how evil the deed that Angela had performed. As Sylar begins to slice Angela's head open, he stops, and Peter realizes that Nathan is fighting for control. Nathan eventually gains control and, after asking Angela what she's done with him, flies off through a window. Peter promises his mother he'll find a way to stop Sylar and have his brother alive.

== Critical reception ==
Steve Heisler of The A.V. Club rated this episode a D.

Robert Canning of IGN gave the episode 7.5 out of 10.
