= Upon This Rock (Heroes) =

- Heroes episode
- Samuel Sullivan (Robert Knepper) sits with Emma as her "siren's song" attracts agrokinetic Ian Michaels.
- Episode no.: Season 4 Episode 13
- Directed by: Ron Underwood
- Written by: Juan Carlos Coto
- Production code: 413
- Original air date: January 4, 2010

Guest appearances
- Deanne Bray as Emma Coolidge; Dawn Olivieri as Lydia; Todd Stashwick as Eli; David H. Lawrence XVII as Eric Doyle; Sasha Pieterse as Amanda Strazzulla; Saemi Nakamura as Kimiko Nakamura; Adam Lazarre-White as Ian Michaels; Justin Evans as Simon Petrelli; Jackson Wurth as Monty Petrelli; Julian De La Celle as Young Samuel Sullivan; Doug Haley as Young Joseph Sullivan

Episode chronology
| ← Previous "The Fifth Stage" | Next → "Let It Bleed" |
- Heroes season 4

"Upon This Rock" is the thirteenth episode of the fourth season of the NBC superhero drama series Heroes, the seventy-first episode overall. It is the first episode in the 2-part mid-season premiere after the 2009 holiday hiatus. The episode aired on January 4, 2010.

== Plot ==
Claire Bennet continues to live among Samuel Sullivan and his Carnival family, although she becomes suspicious of his intentions when she spots Noah Bennet's Primatech files in Samuel's trailer. Samuel simply states that he and her father have more in common then she may know, then leaves for the city to recruit another person for their family. Claire is also bothered by the fact that Eli always seems to be watching her; although Samuel had told Claire she is free to go whenever she likes, he had secretly instructed Eli to watch her and make sure she doesn't. Claire talks to Lydia about Samuel, who fears that Samuel's obsession of collecting people with abilities may not be what's best for them, and urges Claire to investigate his trailer. Claire attempts to enter Samuel's trailer, but finds Eli guarding it. She eventually loses him in the house of mirrors, where she manages to knock him out. Claire investigates the Primatech files, finding countless files on people with abilities, and that Samuel must be using them to track the people down. She also finds a map of the surrounding desert, but before she can look further, Eric Doyle catches her and demands to know what she is up to. Claire tries to convince him that Samuel is up to something, while Doyle doesn't want Claire to mess up the only home they have. Claire states she doesn't wish to do that, to which Doyle finally relents and tells Claire to go ask Lydia. Lydia reveals Samuel had murdered his own brother, though shortly afterward Claire is caught by Eli.

After vanishing from Samuel's carnival, Hiro Nakamura appears in Tokyo, where he begins asking vendors random questions, referencing comic books and science fiction such as Batman, Star Trek, Star Wars, and Sherlock Holmes. He is eventually arrested after using a knife to prevent a woman from having her purse stolen, and Ando Masahashi picks Hiro up from the station. Ando fears that Hiro's brain tumor may be starting to affect him, but then realizes that Hiro is trying to tell him something. After going through Hiro's comic book collection, Ando deduces that Hiro wants them to go to a psychiatric hospital in Florida. Ando proudly wishes to travel with Hiro once again.

Samuel heads to New York City to meet with Emma Coolidge, revealing he was the one who had sent her the cello and convinces her to help him find someone. In Central Park, Samuel urges her to play the cello while at the same time concentrating on finding the man he is looking for, Ian Michaels. Ian is drawn to the music just as Samuel predicted, a homeless man living in the park because he was frightened of his ability. After returning to the hospital to treat the man for an infection, Ian leaves with Samuel, who gives Emma a compass to find her way to them. Samuel returns to the carnival to find Eli holding Claire, who demands to know what he is planning in the desert. Samuel shows the area to her, where Ian uses his ability to transform the desert landscape into a lush, verdant land teeming with plant life. Claire is left speechless and admits it really is beautiful. Afterward, Claire checks her voicemail and finds a message from Peter Petrelli. It is revealed that Peter had Nathan Petrelli's death announced to the public, under the cover that he had died alone in a plane crash. The episode ends with Claire attending Nathan's funeral.

== Critical reception ==
Steve Heisler of The A.V. Club rated this episode together with Let It Bleed a F.

Robert Canning of IGN gave the episode, together with Let It Bleed, 7.3 out of 10.
