= The Fifth Stage =

- Heroes episode
- Peter and Nathan reminisce about the last time they were together on this rooftop (Don't Look Back).
- Episode no.: Season 4 Episode 12
- Directed by: Kevin Dowling
- Written by: Tim Kring
- Production code: 412
- Original air date: November 30, 2009

Guest appearances
- Madeline Zima as Gretchen Berg; Jimmy Jean-Louis as the Haitian; Dawn Olivieri as Lydia; Todd Stashwick as Eli; Elisabeth Röhm as Lauren Gilmore; Carlease Burke as Nurse Hammer; Sasha Pieterse as Amanda Strazzulla

Episode chronology
← Previous "Thanksgiving"	Next → "Upon This Rock"
- Heroes season 4

"The Fifth Stage" is the twelfth episode and mid-season finale of the fourth season of the NBC superhero drama series Heroes and seventieth episode overall. The episode aired on November 30, 2009.

== Plot ==
As Noah Bennet goes over what he knows already about the carnival people, he is surprised by Lauren who decided to take him out on a date to the movies instead of the other way around.

Angela Petrelli meets with Peter Petrelli, informing him he must move to the "fifth stage" and accept that Nathan Petrelli is dead.

Peter then uses the Haitian's other ability to suppress Sylar's mind deep down, allowing Nathan to resurface.

== Critical reception ==
Steve Heisler of The A.V. Club rated this episode a C+.

Robert Canning of IGN gave the episode 7.4 out of 10.
