= Let It Bleed (Heroes) =

- Heroes episode
- Edgar (Ray Park) is captured by Noah to be interrogated.
- Episode no.: Season 4 Episode 14
- Directed by: Jeannot Szwarc
- Written by: Jim Martin
- Production code: 414
- Original air date: January 4, 2010

Guest appearances
- Ray Park as Edgar; Dawn Olivieri as Lydia; Elisabeth Röhm as Lauren Gilmore; David H. Lawrence XVII as Eric Doyle; Dawn-Lyen Gardner as Elizabeth; Justin Evans as Simon Petrelli; Jackson Wurth as Monty Petrelli

Episode chronology
← Previous "Upon This Rock"	Next → "Close to You"
- Heroes season 4

"Let It Bleed" is the fourteenth episode of the fourth season of the NBC superhero drama series Heroes, the seventy-second episode overall. It is the second episode in the 2-part mid-season premiere after the 2009 holiday hiatus. The episode aired on January 4, 2010.

== Plot ==
After escaping from the carnival, Edgar attempts to kill Noah Bennet in a rage, though Noah stops him with a taser. Keeping him in a freezer to slow down his heart rate and prevent him from escaping, Noah begins to interrogate him about the Carnival. Edgar doesn't reveal much, but Lauren suggests he stop torturing him and simply try talking with him. Noah suggests they work together to stop Samuel Sullivan, to which Edgar finally agrees and gives him detailed information about the Carnival layout. After Noah and Lauren begin discussing a raid on the area, Edgar becomes worried that people may be harmed, saying their home must remain intact and that Samuel is the only problem. Edgar escapes from his bonds and flees, taking the drawn Carnival map with him.

At Nathan Petrelli's wake, Peter Petrelli and Claire talk about how their elders, Angela Petrelli and Noah, had always lied to them, including Nathan's death. Angela is worried that Peter's grief may cause him to get himself harmed, and urges Claire to help him deal with Nathan's death. Claire talks to Peter in the kitchen where she cuts herself whilst chopping vegetables. The cut hurts her and does not immediately heal. Peter explains that he still has the Haitian's ability to block others' abilities. Shortly afterwards Claire discovers that Peter has gone to try to stop a crazed office worker from killing his colleagues after being fired. Claire finds Peter attempting to stop the bleeding from one of the wounded; Peter then instructs her to help the woman while he goes to stop the shooter despite Claire's protests. The gunman approaches Claire, though Peter arrives and attempts to talk him down. Though he almost succeeds, the gunman shoots him, though not before Peter manages to subdue him. Peter copies Claire's ability to heal, though not before Claire makes sure Peter won't do anything reckless again. Later, Peter and Claire talk on a rooftop, where Peter promises Claire he won't go after Sylar for revenge. He then asks Claire if she is still in touch with her ex-boyfriend, who had the ability to fly. Later, Peter is shown flying off into the sky in honor of Nathan.

Sylar returns to the carnival, confronting Samuel over what he plans to do with all the people with abilities he has been collecting. Sylar pins Samuel to a wall but finds he can't kill him. Samuel uses the opportunity to incapacitate Sylar with his abilities. Samuel then asks Lydia to use her powers on Sylar to find what he really wants. Lydia reveals to Samuel that Sylar is afraid of dying alone, after being told the same thing by Hiro Nakamura years earlier. Sylar acquires Lydia's ability and discovers she wants to use Sylar for her own means, specifically to stop Samuel, and angrily leaves her. Samuel reveals to Sylar that he loved a woman, Vanessa, though she lives outside the Carnival and Samuel is afraid that she won't accept him for who he really is. Sylar wonders if he is meant to stay or not, and decides to let the ink show. The tattoo on Sylar's arm is revealed to be that of Claire, and the episode ends with Sylar watching Claire through her dorm window.

== Critical reception ==
Steve Heisler of The A.V. Club rated this episode together with Upon This Rock a F.

Robert Canning of IGN gave the episode, together with Upon This Rock, 7.3 out of 10.
