= Acceptance (Heroes) =

- Heroes episode
- Nathan reveals a terrible revelation to old family friend Millie Houston (Swoosie Kurtz).
- Episode no.: Season 4 Episode 4
- Directed by: Christopher Misiano
- Written by: Bryan Fuller
- Production code: 404
- Original air date: October 5, 2009

Guest appearances
- Robert Knepper as Samuel Sullivan; Bruce Boxleitner as Robert Malden; Ray Park as Edgar; Dawn Olivieri as Lydia; Akihiro Kitamura as Tadashi; Saemi Nakamura as Kimiko Nakamura; Jayson Blair as Young Nathan Petrelli; Jamie Tisdale as Kelly Houston; Swoosie Kurtz as Millie Houston; David Atkinson as Assassin

Episode chronology
← Previous "Ink"	Next → "Hysterical Blindness"
- Heroes season 4

"Acceptance" is the fourth episode of the fourth season of the NBC superhero drama series Heroes and sixty-second episode overall. The episode has aired on October 5, 2009.

== Plot ==
The episode opens with Tracy Strauss getting ready to meet with Governor Robert Malden to get her job back. However, she wonders if it's time for herself to change, and after meeting with Noah Bennet, decides she wants to play a more active role in helping people alongside the governor. When she meets with Malden about this, he dismisses it, causing Tracy to excuse herself to the bathroom due to her anger. While inside, Tracy seems to lose control of her water powers, though she forms back together when she calms down. She then coldly leaves Malden in the restaurant.

Hiro Nakamura is happy to discover that his sister, Kimiko, and Ando Masahashi are engaged, and agrees to give away Kimiko. Ando is worried, as Hiro may be dead by then. Ando urges Hiro to accept his fate and tell Kimiko the truth. They are interrupted by a phone call for their "Dial-A-Hero" scheme; a former accountant at their company named Tadashi announces his intent to commit suicide. Hiro talks with him, learning he was fired from his job due to an embarrassing incident at a party. Hiro travels back in time to prevent Tadashi's mistake, and returns to the moment before the phone call. However, he still receives the call, learning that Tadashi had a similar incident at another party. After repeated attempts, Hiro returns to Tadashi, telling him they must each accept their fates, and reveals his terminal illness, finally convincing Tadashi to live. Hiro decides to tell Kimiko he is dying, but, in conversation, begins to have a headache and seems to freeze time. He assures Kimiko he is fine, but vanishes right in front of her.

Peter Petrelli meets with Noah, and attempts to show him the compass tattoo from the previous episode, but finds it gone. Peter leaves, and Noah is visited by Claire, who is concerned her father doesn't have a job. Meanwhile, Edgar begins to doubt Samuel's plan in finding other people with abilities. Samuel then uses Lydia to find another person, though she shows him an image of Noah. Noah is then shown beginning to investigate the compass and his encounter with Edgar.

Nathan Petrelli has disjointed visions of his past after Angela Petrelli gives him a box of items from his childhood in an effort to rekindle his memories and prevent Sylar's personality from emerging. One troubling memory is that of a former girlfriend, Kelly, who he sees dead in a pool. Believing Kelly had run away from her family, Nathan visits her mother, Millie, the same woman Angela met with in "Cold Snap." Millie affirms she has never heard from Kelly since, and Nathan investigates the pool area. Touching the poolside bench, Nathan learns that Kelly had slipped and died by hitting her head on it. Nathan confronts Angela, who confirms his claim and confesses she hid the body and had Nathan's mind erased by the Haitian. Nathan attempts to tell Millie the truth, and she sends him away; he is soon after knocked unconscious by a man. Millie meets with Angela and tells her about the encounter, though Angela dismisses it as Nathan being confused. Nathan is then shown being dragged to a pit, where he is shot and buried. It is revealed the man was hired by Millie. As the man drives away, Sylar erupts from the ground, having survived by use of his healing ability, no longer in the form of Nathan Petrelli.

== Critical reception ==
Steve Heisler of The A.V. Club rated this episode a D−.

Robert Canning of IGN gave the episode 6.5 out of 10.
