= Pass/Fail =

- Heroes episode
- Hiro accepts his fate as he walks by people from throughout his life and into the light.
- Episode no.: Season 4 Episode 16
- Directed by: Michael Nankin
- Written by: Oliver Grigsby
- Production code: 416
- Original air date: January 18, 2010

Guest appearances
- George Takei as Kaito Nakamura; Tamlyn Tomita as Ishi Nakamura; Madeline Zima as Gretchen Berg; Dawn Olivieri as Lydia; David Anders as Adam Monroe; Kate Vernon as Vanessa Wheeler; Lisa Lackey as Janice Parkman; Danielle Savre as Jackie Wilcox; Sally Champlin as Lynette; Satomi Okuno as Young Kimiko Nakamura; Jordan Dang as Young Ando Masahashi; Sasha Pieterse as Amanda Strazzulla

Episode chronology
← Previous "Close to You"	Next → "The Art of Deception"
- Heroes season 4

"Pass/Fail" is the sixteenth episode of the fourth season of the NBC superhero drama series Heroes, and the seventy-fourth episode overall. The episode aired on January 18, 2010.

== Plot ==
Mohinder Suresh constructs a device for Noah Bennet that appears to function like Samuel Sullivan's compass so that Noah, Hiro Nakamura, and Ando Masahashi can locate Samuel and the carnival. Mohinder doesn't wish to go with Noah and leaves to return to India. Soon after he has left, Hiro passes out from his brain tumor, and begins having an hallucination: Hiro is on trial for breaking the Hero's code, punishable by death, having altered the timeline for personal gain. His father Kaito Nakamura appears as the judge, along with Adam Monroe representing the prosecution; Ando appears as Hiro's attorney, while the entire courtroom appears to be inside the Burnt Toast Diner. Adam first calls the younger Ando and Kimiko to the stand, saying Hiro had gone back in time to make them fall in love, while the present Ando argues that Hiro had not done it for selfish reasons. Hiro further adds that no one was hurt by his actions, to which Adam then calls up his next witness, Sylar. Sylar explains that by having Charlie Andrews live, Hiro effectively allowed Sylar to kill all the people he has. Hiro argues that the world would be a better place with Charlie, but Adam points out that she is still lost in time because of Hiro. For the defense, Hiro has himself called to the stand, where Hiro argues that everything he has done was for the good of the world, and if his actions would cause him to be guilty, then he's fine with it. Kaito gives the guilty verdict, causing Hiro in the real world to flatline in a hospital. In his hallucination, Hiro is led towards the light, where Hiro asks for a chance to redeem himself and given it. However, he must fight for his honor, as he is forced into a sword fight with Adam. With the real Ando encouraging him, Hiro manages to defeat Adam, and steps towards the light. His mother, Ishi, then appears, who tells Hiro she will heal him. In the real world, Ando is relieved to see Hiro revived.

Samuel attempts to woo the love of his life, Vanessa. Although she rebuffs his advances initially, she eventually warms to his romantic nature, and the two begin to hit it off. The two talk about a dream of Vanessa's to one day live in a cabin in a gorgeous countryside; Samuel reveals he's brought her dream to life, showing her the cabin in the lush environment. Vanessa is amazed, but admits she can't just live out here with him. Vanessa urges they live among the city, though Samuel is visibly hurt and the two depart. Later, a furious Samuel uses his powers to demolish the entire nearby city, while Vanessa leaves for her home, although she apparently contemplates whether to stay with him or not.

Claire Bennet continues to reject being close with Gretchen, who offers her support, though Claire still feels uncomfortable. Claire later runs into Sylar, who shows her his tattoo and that she must help him. Sylar is afraid of being alone, of not being able to connect with anyone. Claire is furious and doesn't wish to help, but Sylar implies that he is holding Gretchen hostage back in their dorm room. Sylar begins by pointing out that he and Claire are similar, such as both being abandoned and then adopted by parents who don't understand them. Claire tries to flee, but Sylar pins her down; Sylar then kisses Claire and uses Lydia's ability on her. Sylar explains to Claire that by not getting close to anyone, such as Gretchen, she too, like him, may be alone forever. Claire then uses a pencil to stab Sylar in the eye, and flees to her dorm. She finds Gretchen unharmed, but the two are forced to flee when the windows shatter. Fearing Sylar, the two hide in a closet outside. Claire reveals to Gretchen she really does want to be with her, but is afraid. She also admits that Sylar and her are more alike than she knew, as Claire is also afraid she will end up alone for the rest of her life. Claire and Gretchen then deduce it is their powers that are messing up their lives, and by ridding themselves of it, they can be human again. Gretchen then reveals herself to actually be Sylar, who thanks Claire for the talk and tells her he never kidnapped Gretchen in the first place. After he has left, Claire meets with Gretchen, who admits she is thankful she has her, and is ready to be with her; the two walk back to their dorm holding hands, while a lonesome Sylar watches. Later, Sylar attempts to meet Matt Parkman at his home.

== Cast ==
Several recurring guest stars make their last appearance on the show in this episode, most of them during the dream sequence Hiro is trapped in. They include: Jordan Dang and Satomi Okuno (who played younger versions of Ando Masahashi and Kimiko Nakamura in the season's double-length first episode), George Takei and Tamlyn Tomita (who played Hiro's parents Kaito Nakamura and Ishi Nakamura), Danielle Savre (who played cheerleader Jackie Wilcox in the first season), Sally Champlin (who played Lynette, a colleague and friend of Charlie's at the Burnt Toast Diner in seasons 1 and 4), Sasha Pieterse (who played Lydia's daughter Amanda Strazzulla in season 4 and the web-based miniseries Slow Burn) and Kate Vernon (who played Samuel's love interest Vanessa Wheeler). Also making their last appearance are former main cast member David Anders (who played Adam Monroe a.k.a. Takezo Kensei in seasons 2 and 3) and Sendhil Ramamurthy (who was a main cast member as Dr. Mohinder Suresh during all four seasons of the show).

== Critical reception ==
This is the least viewed episode to date with only 3.93 million viewers.

Steve Heisler of The A.V. Club rated this episode a D.

Robert Canning of IGN gave the episode 7.4 out of 10.
