= Hysterical Blindness =

Hysterical blindness is an outmoded term for a condition now designated as a form of conversion disorder.

Hysterical Blindness may also refer to:

- Hysterical Blindness (film), an HBO movie from 2002 starring Gena Rowlands, Uma Thurman and Juliette Lewis
- "Hysterical Blindness" (Heroes), an episode of the TV show Heroes
