= Homestead (film) =

- Theatrical release poster
- Directed by: Ben Smallbone
- Screenplay by: Harligh Morgan; Leah Bateman; Jason Ross
- Based on: Black Autumn by Jeff Kirkham and Jason Ross
- Produced by: Ben Kasica; Andrea Royer; Ben Smallbone
- Starring: Dawn Olivieri; Kearran Giovanni; Bailey Chase; Neal McDonough
- Cinematography: Matthew Rivera
- Edited by: John Puckett
- Music by: Benjamin Backus
- Production companies: Radiate Film Studios; Skies Fall Media Group; 2521 Entertainment; 10 Ton Productions; Black Autumn Show
- Distributed by: Angel Studios
- Release date: December 20, 2024
- Running time: 110 minutes
- Country: United States
- Language: English
- Budget: $8 million
- Box office: $20.8 million

Homestead is a 2024 American post-apocalyptic Christian drama film directed by Ben Smallbone and written by Phillip Abraham, Leah Bateman and Jason Ross. Its stars Neal McDonough, Dawn Olivieri, Currie Graham, Susan Misner, Bailey Chase, Jesse Hutch, Kevin Lawson, Kearran Giovanni, Tyler Lofton, Emmanuel McCord, Olivia Sanabia, Grace Powell and Caden Dragomer. It is based on the book Black Autumn by Jeff Kirkham and Jason Ross.

The film was released in the United States on December 20, 2024. The story continues in a television series titled Homestead: The Series. The first two episodes of the series were released concurrently with the film, and the remainder of season 1 was released in November 2025. Season 2 is in production.

== Plot ==
Wealthy prepper Ian Ross owns a mansion and homesteading compound high atop the city of Oakwood in the Rocky Mountains. Los Angeles is hit by nuclear bombs, followed by an attack on the nation's power grid. Ian has recruited a group of former special forces military soldiers to come to the compound to provide security in the event of a social breakdown and government collapse. The team is led by Jeff Eriksson, who brings his wife Tara and their three children. Their adopted preteen daughter Gracie experiences disturbing, inexplicable visions of the future, which frequently depict violence.

Jeff's military recruits arrive at the Homestead along with Ian's friends and family members as chaos envelops the city. They immediately secure the property's perimeter and supplies of food, plant seed, livestock, water, first aid supplies, firearms, and ammunition. Jeff's security team trains the civilians to defend the Homestead.

Uninvited residents and friends of the Rosses flock to the gates. Blake Masterson, a city government official, attempts to shake down Ian with threats of seizing control of the Homestead. Ian, confident that FEMA will arrive to help, argues with the more pessimistic Jeff. Jenna and Ian also argue over distributing supplies to the refugees. Ian discourages his daughter Clare's budding romance with Jeff's son Abe, fearful it could sour and result in the expulsion of the Erikssons from the Homestead.

Abe and another sentry spot an outsider surveilling the compound and shoot him on Jeff's orders. The Homestead's medical team attempt to save the outsider but he dies. The Homesteaders come to grips with the death and questions emerge about the Rosses' leadership. Ian is convinced to feed the refugees, which further drives a wedge between Jeff and the Rosses.

Masterson and the city's SWAT team, led by Lieutenant Javi Espada, arrive and accuse the Homesteaders of murder, demanding to inventory the weapons in the compound. Jeff is unsure if they are legitimate law enforcement but holds off on firing on them. Ian knows Espada and negotiates a de-escalation with him, but Masterson orders the Homesteaders disarmed and their food confiscated. Masterson confronts Ross and shoots him before Espada can stop him. The Homesteaders return fire on the SWAT team, hitting several of them. Jeff launches a firepower demonstration from a ridgeline and when Espada is convinced to back down, Jeff also orders a cease fire but Ian drops, critically wounded. The SWAT team retreats and Jeff refuses to fire on them.

With Ian in a coma, Jenna allows the refugees inside the compound, believing God will provide for the increased number. The new members reveal much useful expertise in food production, construction, heating, solar electricity, and other survival skills, and enhance the Homestead's self-sufficiency. Jenna's conviction that generosity will compound, rather than deplete, the Homestead's sustainability grows.

EXPANDED PLOT SUMMARY

Following a nuclear attack on Los Angeles and a coordinated assault on the nation’s electrical grid, widespread panic and societal collapse begin spreading across the United States. Wealthy survivalist Ian Ross has spent years preparing for such a catastrophe, establishing a fortified, self-sufficient compound known as the Homestead in the Rocky Mountains near the fictional city of Oakwood.

As the crisis unfolds, Ian welcomes family members, friends, and a private security team led by former Green Beret Jeff Eriksson, who arrives with his wife Tara and their three children. Among them is their adopted daughter Gracie, who experiences mysterious visions depicting violent events and possible glimpses of the future.

Jeff and his team immediately establish defensive measures, secure the compound’s resources, and train its residents to protect themselves. However, tensions emerge as desperate survivors begin gathering outside the gates seeking food, shelter, and protection.

Jeff believes the Homestead’s limited supplies must be preserved for its existing residents and that admitting outsiders could jeopardize everyone’s survival. Ian initially supports maintaining strict control over the property while holding out hope that government assistance will eventually restore order. Ian’s wife, Jenna, increasingly questions the morality of turning away people in need, believing their preparations should serve a greater purpose than protecting themselves alone.

These competing views create divisions within the compound as its residents struggle to balance security, compassion, and the uncertainty of their future. Additional tensions arise over a developing romance between Ian’s daughter Clare and Jeff’s son Abe, which Ian fears could complicate the relationship between their families.

The situation escalates when Jeff orders his security team to shoot an unidentified outsider observed surveilling the property. Although the Homestead’s medical personnel attempt to save the man, he dies from his injuries, raising concerns among residents about the use of deadly force and the authority of the security team.

The death attracts the attention of local government official Blake Masterson, who arrives with a SWAT team led by Lieutenant Javi Espada. Masterson accuses the Homestead’s residents of murder and demands access to their weapons and supplies. While Ian attempts to negotiate peacefully with Espada, Masterson orders the compound disarmed and its food confiscated.

The confrontation turns violent when Masterson shoots Ian. The Homestead’s defenders exchange gunfire with the SWAT officers before Jeff demonstrates the compound’s defensive capabilities and negotiates a ceasefire. The SWAT team withdraws, leaving Ian critically wounded and unconscious.

With her husband incapacitated, Jenna assumes a greater leadership role and makes the controversial decision to open the Homestead’s gates to the refugees. Despite warnings that the additional residents will exhaust their limited resources, she maintains that helping others is both a moral responsibility and an expression of her Christian faith.

The newcomers soon prove valuable to the community, contributing expertise in agriculture, construction, heating, renewable energy, and other essential survival skills. Their contributions strengthen the Homestead’s ability to sustain itself and challenge the belief that survival depends primarily on isolation and armed protection.

As the community begins adapting to its new circumstances, the residents confront differing ideas about leadership, faith, cooperation, and the meaning of survival. Jenna’s decision marks a turning point for the Homestead, transforming it from a private refuge built to withstand societal collapse into a growing community whose future depends on the contributions and cooperation of its members.

The film concludes without resolving the broader national catastrophe or Gracie’s mysterious visions, leaving several storylines open for continuation.

== Cast ==
The official website lists the following cast:

- Neal McDonough as Ian Ross
- Dawn Olivieri as Jenna Ross
- Bailey Chase as Jeff Eriksson
- Kearran Giovanni as Tara Eriksson
- Susan Misner as Evie McNulty
- Tyler Lofton as Abe Eriksson
- Kevin Lawson as "Tick"
- Currie Graham as Blake Masterson
- Olivia Sanabia as Claire Ross
- Jesse Hutch as Evan Lee
- Ariel Llinas as Lieutenant Javi Espada
- Grace Powell as Molly McNulty
- Jarrett LeMaster as Rick Baumgartner
- Caden Dragomer as Theo McNulty
- Emmanuel McCord as Bing
- Ivey Lloyd Mitchell as Marta Baumgartner
- Colby Strong as Christian
- Iñigo Pascual as Young Man Who Detonated Bomb
- Matt Koenig as Malcolm

== Production ==
In January 2024, Angel Studios announced that a post-apocalyptic drama film titled Homestead had completed filming with Ben Smallbone directing, and Phillip Abraham, Leah Bateman and Jason Ross writing the screenplay. Neal McDonough, Dawn Olivieri, Currie Graham, Susan Misner, Bailey Chase, Jesse Hutch, Kevin Lawson, Kearran Giovanni, Tyler Lofton, Olivia Sanabia, Grace Powell and Caden Dragomer round out the main cast.

Principal photography began on August 7, 2023, in Salt Lake City.

== Release ==
Homestead was released in the United States on December 20, 2024.

== Reception ==
=== Box office ===
In the United States, the film made $6 million from 1,886 theaters in its opening weekend, finishing fifth in the box office top ten. It added $3.1 million in its second weekend, and $2 million in its third, dropping to ninth. It finished its box office run with $20.8 million.

=== Critical response ===
On the review aggregator website Rotten Tomatoes, 45% of 22 critics' reviews are positive, with an average rating of 5.5/10. Metacritic, which uses a weighted average, assigned the film a score of 44 out of 100, based on five critics, indicating "mixed or average" reviews. Audiences polled by CinemaScore gave the film an average grade of "B" on an A+ to F scale, and 85% positive on PostTrak.

== Television series ==
The film served as a sort of pilot for Homestead: The Series, which was released as a streaming television series of the same name that continues the storyline of the film. The first season was intended to be released with or shortly after the film, but weather-related delays on set in Utah halted production after the first two episodes were filmed. The first two episodes were released on the Angel streaming platform concurrently with the film. Production resumed on the remainder of season 1 in 2025, and the remaining six episodes of season 1 were released in November 2025. Season 2 is in production.
