= A Snow White Christmas (musical) =

Pantomime version of Snow White

A Snow White Christmas is a pantomime version of the fairytale Snow White, with a book by Kris Lythgoe and a score consisting of a pastiche of well-known pop tunes. It was first produced in 2011 at the El Portal Theatre in North Hollywood, California. The music includes songs by Katy Perry, Bruno Mars, Michael Jackson, The Village People, Britney Spears, Lady Gaga and Hall & Oates, among others. Like other pantomime-style musicals, the show includes magic, dancing, singing, acting, audience interactivity and sing-a-long segments.

== Plot ==
The story follows the traditional Snow White fairytale with some additional characters. Muddles is the court jester to the Queen and is Snow White's best friend. As in other pantomimes, the 4th wall is broken by the actors, who encourage the audience to cheer for Snow White and boo the Wicked Queen.

== Songs ==
=== Act 1 ===
- "Born This Way" – Snow White
- "The Lazy Song" – The Dwarves
- "The Power of Love" – Prince Harry
- "Thriller" – Company
- "Toxic" – Wicked Queen
- "YMCA" – The Dwarves
- "Firework" – Snow White
- "Just the Way You Are" – Wicked Queen

=== Act 2 ===
- "You Make My Dreams" – Snow White
- "Celebration" – Company
- "Nothing's Gonna Change My Love for You" – Prince and Snow White

== Productions ==
=== El Portal Theatre 2011 ===
The show was first produced in 2011 at the El Portal Theatre in North Hollywood starring Lindsay Pearce in the title role, Erich Bergen as Prince Harry, and Marina Sirtis as the Wicked Queen. The show featured Neil Patrick Harris as the onscreen Magic Mirror. It received generally positive reviews.

=== Pasadena Playhouse 2012 ===
The show was revived in December 2012 by the Pasadena Playhouse and featured Ariana Grande as Snow White, Curt Hansen as Prince Harry and Charlene Tilton as the Wicked Queen. The show once again featured Neil Patrick Harris as the onscreen Magic Mirror and received positive reviews.

=== Salt Lake City 2013 ===
In 2013 the show was produced at the Rose Wagner Theatre in Salt Lake City starring David Osmond and Amy Whitcomb. The show featured Nigel Lythgoe as the onscreen Magic Mirror and received good reviews.

=== Pasadena Civic Auditorium 2019 ===
In 2019, a 10th anniversary production by Lythgoe Family Panto featured Olivia Sanabia as Snow White, Michelle Williams as the Wicked Queen, Neil Patrick Harris as the Magic Mirror, Garrett Clayton as Herman and Jared Gertner as Muddles. It first played at the Duke Energy Center in North Carolina and then moved to the Pasadena Civic Auditorium.

== Roles and principal casts ==
Role	Hollywood 2011	Pasadena 2012	Salt Lake City, 2013	Pasadena 2019
Prince Harry	Erich Bergen	Curt Hansen	David Osmond	Michael Campion
Snow White	Lindsay Pearce	Ariana Grande	Amy Whitcomb	Olivia Sanabia
Herman	David Figlioli	David Figlioli	David Figlioli	Garrett Clayton
Wicked Queen	Marina Sirtis	Charlene Tilton	Margo Watson	Michelle Williams
Muddles	Jonathan Meza	Jonathan Meza	Jonathan Meza	Jared Gertner
Magic Mirror	Neil Patrick Harris	Neil Patrick Harris	Nigel Lythgoe	Neil Patrick Harris
