= Jesse Hutch =

Canadian-American actor (born 1981)

- Born: Jesse Hutchakowski; February 12, 1981 (age 45); Alberta, Canada
- Occupation: Actor
- Years active: 2001–present
- Spouse: Loreili Hutch (m. 2010) (3 kids)

Jesse Hutchakowski (born February 12, 1981), known professionally as Jesse Hutch, is a Canadian and American actor. He spends his time traveling between the USA and Canada. He worked on the television show American Dreams as Jimmy Riley, romantic interest of main character Meg Pryor (Brittany Snow). In 2007, he played a major character on the Sci-Fi Channel TV-movie Termination Point. Most recently, he had a recurring role in the second season of Arrow and the second season of Batwoman.

== Biography ==
Hutch grew up in various places across Canada. He attended an Outdoor Education Program at Algonquin College. He was a white water raft guide for four years before beginning to pursue a career as an actor.

He first appeared in character roles in productions such as Dark Angel, Smallville and Taken. His lead role in the series About a Girl aired on The N network. In 2010, Hutch guest starred on The CW drama Hellcats, appearing in one episode.

== Filmography ==
=== Film ===
Year	Title	Role
2003	Freddy vs. Jason	Trey
2004	The Butterfly Effect	Spencer
2006	The Tooth Fairy	Bobby Boulet (video)
2006	In Her Line of Fire	Rosen
2010	A Dangerous Man	Sergey (video)
2013	12 Rounds 2: Reloaded	Swat #1 (video)
2014	Joy Ride 3: Roadkill	Jordon Wells (video)
2018	Pretty Little Stalker	Harry
2024	Homestead	Evan Lee

=== Television ===
Year	Title	Role	Notes
2001	Dark Angel	Gill Guy	Season 2, episode 8
2002	Just Cause	Matt Simmons	Season 1, episode 10
2002	Smallville	Troy Turner	Season 1, episode 10; season 2, episode 6
2002	Taken	Groom Lake Private	Season 1, episode 5
2002–2004	American Dreams	Jimmy Riley	Recurring -"Pilot" -"New Frontier" -"Pryor Knowledge" -"The Fighting Irish" -"Silent Night" -"I Wanna Hold Your Hand" -"The One" -"Where the Boys Are" -"The 7–10 Split" -"Shoot the Moon"
2003	Peacemakers	Kevin Taylor	Season 1, episode 6
2003	Romeo!	Cory Deiter	Season 3, episode 3
2004	The 4400	Brad Rossi	Episode: "Pilot"
2004	Tru Calling	Ronny Clifton	Season 1, episode 10
2005	Smallville	Billy Durden	Episode: "Spirit"
2005	Behind the Camera: The Unauthorized Story of 'Mork & Mindy'	Crazed Fan	TV flm
2006	Fallen	Peter Lockhart	ABC Family Mini-series
2007	Termination Point	Mark Loogan	TV film
2007	A.M.P.E.D.	Anthony Bring	TV film
2007–2008	About A Girl	Jason Mcholm	Series regular
2009	Kyle XY	Nate Harrison	Recurring -"Bringing Down the House" -"Guess Who's Coming to Dinner" -"The Tell-Tale Heart" -"Chemistry 101" -"Welcome to Latnok"
2010	Hellcats	Keith Allan	Episode: "God Must Have My Fortune Laid Away"
2011	A Mile in His Shoes	George "Lefty" Rogers	TV film
2011	Three Weeks, Three Kids	Quinn Richards	Hallmark TV Film
2011	Heartland	Bryce	2 episodes
2012	True Justice	Johnny Garcia	7 episodes
2012	Once Upon a Time	Peter	Season 1, episode 15: "Red-Handed"
2013	Let It Snow	Brady Lewis	Hallmark TV Film
2013–14	Arrow	Officer Daily	Recurring role
2014	Almost Human	Jake Bellman	Season 1, episode 12
2014-15	Cedar Cove	Luke Bailey	Series regular (Seasons 2-3)
2014	My Boyfriends' Dogs	Wade	Hallmark TV Film
2015	Harvest Moon	Brett Jarrett	Hallmark TV Film
2015	Becoming Santa	Connor	Lifetime TV Film
2017	Love’s Last Resort	Eric	TV film
2017	Mr. Snowman a.k.a. Snowmance	Cole	TV film, ION network
2018	Finding My Daughter	Jake	Lifetime TV Film
2019	A Very Vintage Christmas	Ed	Lifetime TV Film
2020	My Birthday Romance	Will	TV film
2020	Batwoman	Crow Agent #1	Episode: "Take Your Choice"
2020	Project Blue Book	Rex Chapman	Season 2, episode 7: "Curse of the Skinwalker"
2021	Batwoman	Attending Nurse #1	Episode: "Do Not Resucitate"
2021	For the Love of Chocolate	Ryan	Great American Family Movie
2021	Batwoman	Russell Tavaroff	Recurring role
2021	Love and Chocolate		Reel One Entertainment
2021	Love on the Road	Tom Billings	TV film
2022	Christmas in Toyland	Grant	Hallmark Movie
2022	B&B Merry	Graham	TV film
2023	A Christmas Blessing	Otto	TV film
2024	Christmas Under the Northern Lights	Trevor	Great American Family
2024	A Little Women's Christmas		TV film
2024	Sleigh Bells and Sugarplums		TV film
2024-present	Homestead: The Series	Evan Lee	Main cast
