= Kate Vernon =

Canadian-American actress (born 1961)

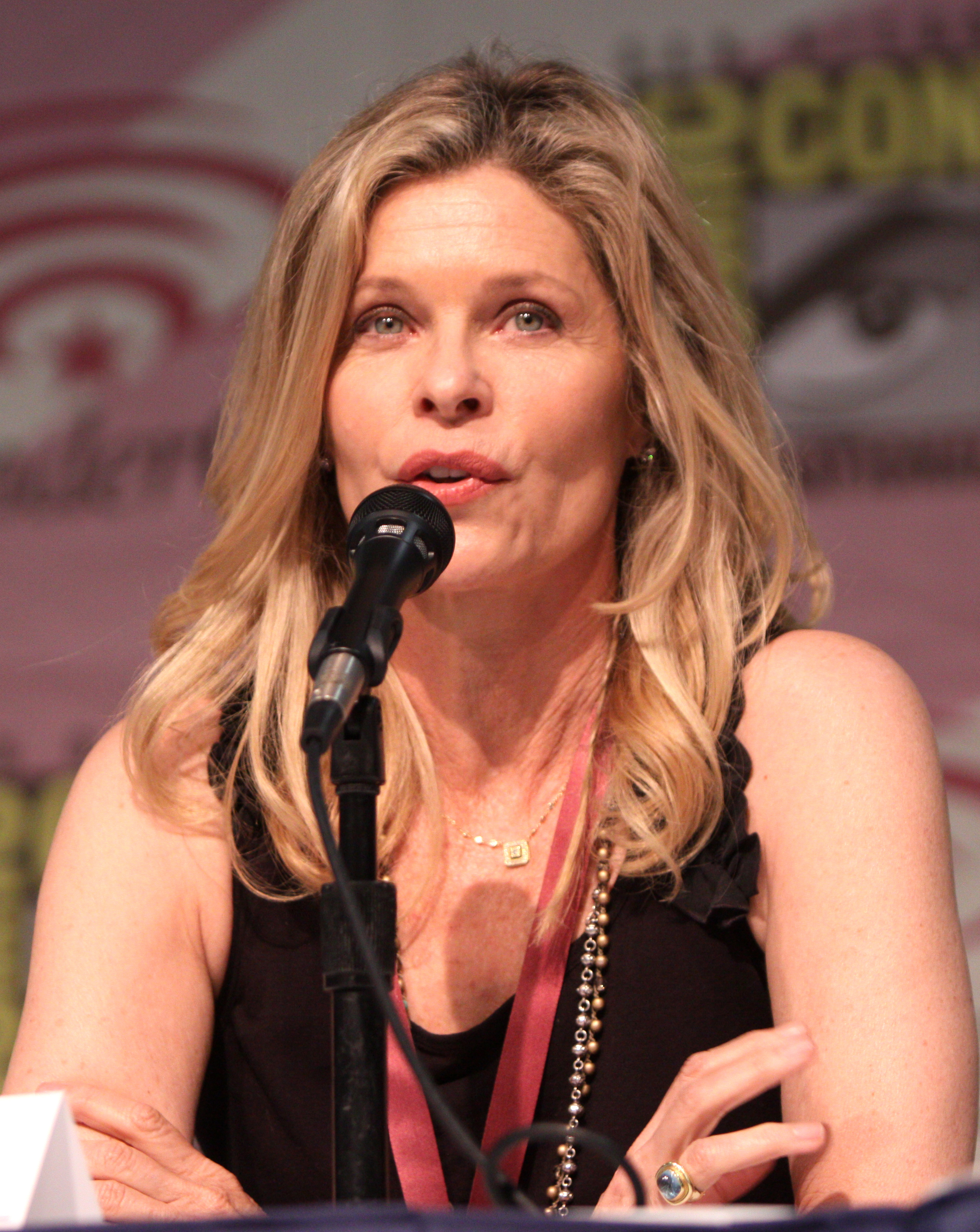
- Vernon at Comic Con 2013
- Born: Katherine Elizabeth Vernon; April 21, 1961 (age 65); Toronto, Ontario, Canada
- Occupation: Actress
- Years active: 1983–present
- Known for: Battlestar Galactica; Falcon Crest; Who's the Boss; L.A. Law; Star Trek: Voyager
- Partner: Chuck Negron (d.2026)
- Children: 1
- Father: John Vernon
- Relatives: Nan Vernon (sister)

Katherine Elizabeth Vernon (born April 21, 1961) is a Canadian-born American actress. She is known for her roles as Lorraine Prescott on the CBS primetime soap opera Falcon Crest (1984–1985), the stuck-up Benny Hanson in the comedy film Pretty in Pink (1986), Sophia in the 1992 film Malcolm X, and Ellen Tigh in the 2004 Syfy series Battlestar Galactica.

== Early life ==
Vernon was born in Toronto, Ontario, Canada, to Nancy West and actor John Vernon. At age seven, she moved with her family to Los Angeles, California, where her father was pursuing his career. Her sister is singer Nan Vernon.

== Career ==
Vernon portrayed Lorraine Prescott on the CBS prime time soap opera Falcon Crest from 1984 to 1985. During the 1980s, she appeared on various TV series, including Family Ties, Dallas, Remington Steele, Hotel, Murder, She Wrote and the 1987 miniseries I'll Take Manhattan, as well as the 1986 comedy-drama film Pretty in Pink, and the 1989 gangster comedy Mob Story, in which she appeared opposite her father. Other early film credits included Alphabet City (1984) and Roadhouse 66 (1985).

In 1990, Vernon portrayed Kathleen Sawyer in a four-episode arc on Who's the Boss?, followed by extended appearances on L.A. Law in 1994 as A.D.A. Belinda Fox (four episodes) and on Nash Bridges in 1996–1997 as Whitney Thomas (seven episodes). Among many other roles, she co-starred as Sophia in the 1992 film Malcolm X, appeared in the 1992 Italian sci-fi film Jackpot, portrayed Alexandra on the 1996 series Kindred: The Embraced and appeared in a 1998 episode of Star Trek: Voyager entitled "In the Flesh". She played Dr. Rachel Stein in the 1998 TV movie Blackjack.

From 2004 to 2009, Vernon portrayed the recurring role of Ellen Tigh on Battlestar Galactica, as well as the 2009 television film Battlestar Galactica: The Plan. In April 2009, she made a guest appearance in the CSI: Crime Scene Investigation episode "A Space Oddity", which also featured cameos by her former Galactica producer Ronald D. Moore and co-stars Grace Park and Rekha Sharma.

In 2010, Vernon guest starred in two episodes of Heroes ("Close to You" and "Pass/Fail") as Vanessa Wheeler, and in 2014 portrayed Diana Sydney on The 100 and Starfleet captain Sonya Alexander in the fan film Star Trek: Prelude to Axanar. In 2016, Vernon played Caroline Morrow in an episode of NCIS. She appeared in several episodes of the Apple TV+ series The Morning Show in 2019.

In 2021, Vernon appeared on the science fiction TV series Another Life with her Battlestar Galactica co-stars Sharma and Katee Sackhoff.

== Filmography ==
=== Film ===
Year	Title	Role	Director	Notes
1983	Chained Heat	Cellmate	Paul Nicholas	
1984	Alphabet City	Angie	Amos Poe	
1984	Roadhouse 66	Melissa Duran	John Mark Robinson	
1986	The Last of Philip Banter	Brent	Hervé Hachuel	
1986	Pretty in Pink	Benny Hanson	Howard Deutch	
1988	Hostile Takeover a.k.a. Office Party	Sally	George Mihalka	
1989	Mob Story	Mindy	Gabriel & Jancarlo Markiw	
1992	Jackpot	Prudence	Mario Orfini	
1992	Malcolm X	Sophia	Spike Lee	
1994	Soft Deceit	Anne Fowler	Jorge Montesi	
1994	Dangerous Touch	Amanda Grace	Lou Diamond Phillips	
1996	Joe's Wedding	Uta Mann	Michael Kennedy	
1999	The Secret Life of Girls	Kay	Holly Goldberg Sloan	
2004	Buds for Life	Valerie Quinlan	Gabriel Bologna	
2004	Grave Matters	Christine	Aimee Stevenson	
2005	Confession	Detective Robin Mallory	Jonathan Meyers	
2007	Safe Harbour	Sally	Bill Corcoran	
2010	The Last Song	Susan Blakelee	Julie Anne Robinson	
2011	National Lampoon's Snatched	Diane	Joe Cacaci	
2014	108 Stitches	President Jennine Wormer Pratt	David Rountree	
2014	Prelude to Axanar	Captain Sonya Alexander	Christian Gossett	Short
2017	Chicanery	Billie Endicott	Charles Dennis	
2017	Amelia 2.0	Dr. Ellen Beckett	Adam Orton	
2017	12 Round Gun	Catherine	Sam Upton	
2018	His Master's Voice	Camille	György Pálfi	
2018	La Boda de Valentina	Melanie Tate	Marco Polo Constandse	
2018	Barking Mad	Arabella Gravesend	Charles Dennis	

=== Television ===
Year	Title	Role	Director	Notes
1984	Flight 90: Disaster on the Potomac	Donna Adams	Robert Michael Lewis	TV movie
1984	Dallas	Peter's friend	Larry Hagman	1 Episode
1984	Family Ties	Christy	Will Mackenzie	1 Episode
1984	Remington Steele	Nancy Evans	Don Weis	1 Episode
1984–1985	Falcon Crest	Lorraine Prescott	Reza Badiyi, Barbara Peeters, ...	25 Episodes
1985–1986	Hotel	Erica Atwood / Sandy Hoyle	Charles S. Dubin & James L. Conway	2 Episodes
1987	I'll Take Manhattan	Nanette Alexander	Douglas Hickox & Richard Michaels	TV Mini-Series
1987	The Law & Harry McGraw	Kate Hossler	Peter Crane	1 episode
1987–1989	Murder, She Wrote	Rhonda Sykes / Connie Norton	Peter Crane & Anthony Pullen Shaw	2 Episodes
1988	CBS Summer Playhouse	Ellen Sanders	Jonathan R. Betuel	1 Episode
1988	Alfred Hitchcock Presents	Donna	Atom Egoyan	1 Episode
1990	FM	Stephanie	Andy Cadiff	1 Episode
1990	Who's the Boss?	Kathleen Sawyer	Asaad Kelada & Tony Singletary	4 Episodes
1991	Daughters of Privilege	Diana	Michael Fresco	TV movie
1991	Perry Mason: The Case of the Glass Coffin	Terry Weidner	Christian I. Nyby II	TV movie
1991	Tropical Heat	Veronica	Mario Philip Azzopardi	1 Episode
1991	Jake and the Fatman	Rachel Garraty	Daniel Attias	1 Episode
1991	Father Dowling Mysteries	Rita Winters	James Frawley	1 Episode
1993	House of Secrets	Laura Morrell	Mimi Leder	TV movie
1993	Lovejoy	Mary-John Lovejoy	Geoffrey Sax	1 Episode
1993	Tales from the Crypt	Lucy Chadwick	W. Peter Iliff	1 Episode
1994	Probable Cause	Lynn Reilly	Paul Ziller	TV movie
1994	L.A. Law	DDA Belinda Fox	Mark Tinker, Elodie Keene, ...	4 Episodes
1995	Bloodknot	Connie Alexander	Jorge Montesi	TV movie
1995	The Sister-in-Law	Rae Phillips / Sally Rae Preston	Noel Nosseck	TV movie
1995	The Outer Limits	Tricia Lange	Tibor Takács	1 Episode
1996	Downdraft	Alexa	Michael Mazo	TV movie
1996	Kindred: The Embraced	Alexandra Serris	Peter Medak	1 Episode
1996–1997	Nash Bridges	Whitney Thomas	Greg Beeman, Neal Israel	7 Episodes
1998	Blackjack	Dr. Rachel Stein	John Woo	TV movie
1998	Flood: A River's Rampage	Pat Mallory	Bruce Pittman	TV movie
1998	The Outer Limits	Judy Warren	Jorge Montesi	1 Episode
1998	Star Trek: Voyager	Valerie Archer	David Livingston	1 Episode
1999	Y2K	Alix Cromwell	Dick Lowry	TV movie
1999	The Hunger	Lanie	Luke Scott	1 Episode
1999	Soldier of Fortune, Inc.	Jody Frost / Nadya Rinkova	Peter Bloomfield	1 Episode
2000	Any Day Now	Della Mae Connor	Artie Mandelberg	1 Episode
2001	Largo Winch: The Heir	Monique Winch-Hastings	David Wu	TV movie
2001	Largo Winch	Monique Winch	Laurent Brégeat	1 Episode
2001	Dawson's Creek	Woman	Lev L. Spiro	1 Episode
2003	Wilder Days	Dorothy Morse	David Mickey Evans	TV movie
2003	Black Sash	Jenny	Stuart Gillard	1 Episode
2003	Hunter	Maggie	Tawnia McKiernan	2 Episodes
2004	CSI: Crime Scene Investigation	Raina Press	Deran Sarafian	1 Episode
2004–2009	Battlestar Galactica	Ellen Tigh	Michael Rymer, Rod Hardy, ...	23 Episodes
2005	Family Plan	Victoria	David S. Cass Sr.	TV movie
2005	School of Life	Elli Warner	William Dear	TV movie
2005	Knights of the South Bronx	Richard's wife	Allen Hughes	TV movie
2005	Reunion	Brenda Moretti	Rick Rosenthal & Lou Antonio	2 Episodes
2006	Last Chance Cafe	Hallie Boyer	Jorge Montesi	TV movie
2009	Battlestar Galactica: The Plan	Ellen Tigh	Edward James Olmos	TV movie
2009	The Mentalist	Arden Plaskett	Chris Long	1 Episode
2009	Saving Grace	Ellen Cooper	Rohn Schmidt	1 Episode
2009	CSI: Crime Scene Investigation	Dr. Penelope Russell	Michael Nankin	1 Episode
2010	Bones	Rowan	François Velle	TV series (1 Episode)
2010	Heroes	Vanessa Wheeler	Roxann Dawson & Michael Nankin	TV series (2 Episodes)
2011	Red Faction: Origins	The Matriarch	Michael Nankin	TV movie
2012	The Firm		George Mihalka	1 Episode
2013	Battledogs	Dr. Ellen Gordon	Alexander Yellen	TV movie
2013	Arctic Air	Irene Ivarson	Kevin Fair	1 Episode
2014	Perception	Mary Morrison	LeVar Burton	1 Episode
2014	The 100	Diana Sydney	John Showalter, John Behring, ...	3 Episodes
2015	Christmas Truce	Helena Hammond	Brian Skiba	TV movie
2016	NCIS	Caroline Morrow	Leslie Libman	1 Episode
2017	Groomzilla	Olivia	Bradford May	TV movie
2017	There's... Johnny!	Mrs. De Cordova	David Gordon Green	1 Episode
2018	Condor	Lily Partridge	Lawrence Trilling, Kari Skogland	4 Episodes
2019	Anniversary Nightmare aka Wrongfully Accused	Barbara	Michael Feifer	TV movie
2019	The Morning Show	Geneva Micklen	Mimi Leder, David Frankel, ...	5 Episodes
2021	Another Life	Ava Breckenridge	Kevin Dowling, Kellie Cyrus	TV series
2025	Sullivan's Crossing	Helen Culver	Jonathan Knight, et al.	TV series

== Personal life ==
Vernon shares a daughter with Chuck Negron, founding member and lead vocalist of the rock band Three Dog Night.
