= Brother's Keeper (Heroes) =

- Heroes episode
- Claire helps out Tracy as she is losing control of her ability.
- Episode no.: Season 4 Episode 10
- Directed by: Bryan Spicer
- Written by: Rob Fresco and; Mark Verheiden
- Production code: 410
- Original air date: November 16, 2009

Guest appearances
- Jimmy Jean-Louis as the Haitian; Andrew Connolly as Joseph Sullivan; Ravi Kapoor as Young Chandra Suresh; Kavi Ladnier as Mira Shenoy; Dawn-Lyen Gardner as Elizabeth; Heather Ankeny as Beth

Episode chronology
← Previous "Shadowboxing"	Next → "Thanksgiving"
- Heroes season 4

"Brother's Keeper" is the tenth episode of the fourth season of the NBC superhero drama series Heroes and sixty-eighth episode overall. The episode aired on November 16, 2009.

== Plot ==
Tracy Strauss finds herself losing control of her powers, so she heads to Noah Bennet's apartment where Claire Bennet finds her. Tracy reveals what has been happening to her, so Claire tries to help, only to have Tracy inadvertently freeze her. However, Claire regenerates and they begin talking about how the problem must be psychological and they remark on the difficulty in making friends in the normal world. Tracy tells Claire about her meeting with Samuel Sullivan at the carnival; Claire reveals she's met Samuel as well, and surprisingly encourages her to go there. Later, Tracy contacts Samuel, who is pleased to hear she wishes to join him. Samuel then begins telling her how her powers can be of use to him.

Samuel informs Hiro Nakamura that he wishes to have him not save Mohinder Suresh's life as was originally thought, but retrieve a film from Mohinder that he had destroyed shortly before his death. Nine weeks earlier, Mohinder is shown to be living happily in India, reunited with his love Mira. However, he has kept a box of his father Chandra Suresh's research that he had uncovered at Coyote Sands, including the film in question. Mohinder views the video, where his father explains that a boy born at Coyote Sands, revealed to be Samuel, had a certain affinity to powers that could cause his own powers to increase exponentially if surrounded by other people with abilities. Hoping to put a stop to Samuel, Mohinder heads to the carnival where he finds Samuel's then-alive brother Joseph. Joseph reveals he is aware of Samuel's power, having kept watch over him his entire life to prevent him from gaining immense power. He then tells Mohinder to leave, saying he'll keep Samuel in check and telling Mohinder that no one can know about this. Later, Mohinder prepares to burn the film, but just as he is about to, Hiro arrives and stops time, switching out the film for a fake. When Hiro has left, Samuel enters the room and, having overheard the previous conversation between his brother and Mohinder, demands to know what was on the film. Mohinder refuses to tell, and in a fit of rage, Samuel uses his powers to impale Mohinder with sharp rocks. Once Samuel has left, however, Mohinder gets up, as Hiro had outfitted him with a Kevlar vest, having learned of what happened to Mohinder due to arriving too late the first time he tried to reach him. Hiro agrees that Samuel must be stopped, but explains he first needs the film to save his love Charlie Andrews. He then tells Mohinder that he must stay low for eight weeks until he can save Charlie, but Mohinder refuses, intending to prevent Samuel from achieving his ultimate power. Reluctantly, Hiro makes Mohinder disappear by trapping him in a mental institution. Hiro delivers the film to Samuel, who tells him he will be reunited with Charlie soon but he is also unaware Mohinder is still alive.

Peter Petrelli escorts Nathan Petrelli, who is still confused over what had happened to him over the past week, to his first day back at work. The Haitian then arrives, informing Peter that Angela Petrelli had sent him to wipe their memories, but instead tells Peter he needs to know the truth and gives him the address of a storage facility. Although the Haitian had only intended Peter to find out, Peter brings Nathan along anyway, and discover a metal casket which contains the apparently embalmed corpse of Nathan. When Nathan touches what appears to be his dead self, bits and pieces of the events surrounding the death of Nathan (as shown in "An Invisible Thread") come into his mind, including Matt Parkman's attempt to push Sylar's thoughts out of his head and replace them with Nathan's and the real Nathan's death. The brothers decide to find Matt, who they discover is in critical condition and under guard in a Texas hospital. They sneak into Matt's room and Peter heals him, though Matt immediately warns them to leave. Matt tells the brothers the whole story: that the real Nathan is dead and lying in the storage unit as they saw for themselves. Peter seems unconvinced, but Nathan begins to believe him, pointing out that it's the only explanation to his newfound abilities. Sylar then takes control of Matt and attempts to convince Nathan that by touching him he can learn the whole truth; Sylar reveals to Matt that by touching him, he can transfer back to his original body. Peter attempts to keep Nathan away, only to have him flung away by telekinesis, as Nathan wishes to touch him. The guard learns of their presence and enters the room. He grabs Nathan, only to have him brush up against Matt's hand, allowing Sylar's mind to transfer back in, although Nathan remains in control. Nathan then flings the cop into a wall, grabs Peter, and flies them both away to the Grand Canyon. Although Matt is horrified that Sylar has returned to his original body, he is also relieved Sylar has left his, and using his telepathy, Matt sneaks out of the hospital. Nathan is devastated to think that he is really Sylar, while Peter grabs onto him, assuming his flight power, refusing to let Nathan go at it alone. Later, Nathan asks Peter how he can live knowing Nathan is really Sylar.

== Critical reception ==
Steve Heisler of The A.V. Club rated this episode a C−.

Robert Canning of IGN gave the episode 8.4 out of 10.
