= Homestead: The Series =

American television series

- Genre: Post-apocalyptic; Drama; Thriller
- Created by: Jayson Orvis
- Showrunner: Ben Kasica
- Starring: Dawn Olivieri; Charles Esten; Olivia Sanabia; Bailey Chase; Kearran Giovanni; Tyler Lofton; Georgie Snow White; Jesse Hutch; Jill Wagner; Manny McCord; Currie Graham; Ariel Llinas
- Composer: Benjamin Backus
- Country of origin: United States
- Original language: English
- No. of seasons: 1
- No. of episodes: 8

Production
- Executive producers: David Fischer; Ben Kasica; Jason Ross
- Cinematography: Matthew Rivera
- Production company: Angel Studios

Original release
- Network: Angel Studios
- Release: December 24, 2024 – present

Related
- Homestead

Homestead: The Series is an American post-apocalyptic drama television series produced and distributed by Angel Studios on their Angel streaming platform. Based on the book series Black Autumn: A Post-Apocalyptic Saga, it picks up where the Homestead film left off. The film was released in December 2024 and the first two episodes of the series were released on Angel concurrently. Production of the remainder of season 1 resumed after the film was released and episode 3 premiered on November 26, 2025.

The series follows a group of people who have gathered at wealthy prepper Ian Ross's compound in the Rocky Mountains in the aftermath of a nuclear attack on Los Angeles and subsequent nationwide blackout which cuts off nearly all electricity and communication. The first season chronicles the events in the two months after the attacks. After Ian is critically wounded, his wife Jenna tries to maintain control of the Homestead and carry out Ian's wishes as a power struggle develops between her and the military special forces soldiers who Ian invited to provide security for the Homestead compound. Refugees gather outside the gates of the Homestead and Jenna wrestles with whether and how to help them. Meanwhile, a force led by local government officials and FEMA operatives threatens to take over the Homestead and recruits local gangs and thugs to join them.

The first season is composed of eight episodes. It has been renewed for a second season.

== Overview ==
The series is a continuation of the Homestead film. Wealthy prepper Ian Ross and his wife Jenna own a mansion and homesteading compound high atop the city of Oakwood in the Rocky Mountains. It is secured by a group of former special forces military soldiers who had been recruited by Ian to set up camp in the event of social breakdown and government collapse. The security forces are led by Jeff Eriksson, a former military special forces operative and Drug Enforcement Administration agent, and his wife Tara, who have three children. Their adopted preteen daughter Gracie experiences visions of the future, which frequently depict violence. A nuclear attack on Los Angeles followed by destruction of the nation's power grid has wiped out supply chains and communication. The security forces and invited friends and family of the Rosses have set up a homesteading operation to grow food, produce solar electricity, and provide for its residents. A hundred uninvited residents of the city gather outside the gates as refugees, forcing Ian and Jenna to decide whether to help them since they believe their supplies will only go so far. As word spreads through town of their resources, a city government official named Blake Masterson and the SWAT team attempt to seize control of the Homestead, resulting in a confrontation in which Ian is shot while trying to defuse the situation. While Ian is in a coma, Jenna decides to let the refugees in and finds they bring new skills and expertise and cooperation, which actually increases the Homestead's self-sufficiency. But threats continue to grow as outsiders envy what they have, and Jenna must grapple with how far her faith will allow her to go.

As the series opens, Ian has slipped back into a coma, more refugees have gathered outside the gates, and the Homesteaders set up a trading post. The city government has set up their own compound called Raven Rock, with FEMA resources and government operatives. They begin recruiting and arming gang members and thugs from town for an eventual attack on the Homestead. The Homesteaders engage in daily training and drills, including the women, who become experienced with various types of weapons and battle tactics. Tom Reynolds, an engineer and friend of Ian, and his pregnant wife Jacq, a therapist, arrive at the gates and are admitted by Jenna. Abe and Clare's romance buds but they must decide how to reconcile their different worldviews and their loyalties to their parents, who have continued to clash. Georgie, who had been adopted by the Eriksson's six months prior after Jeff found her hiding in a drug den during a DEA raid, is alone in the woods when she sees a man attempt to grab her. Jeff is enraged and decides to retaliate against those they believe to be responsible at the behest of a soldier named Bing, creating more enemies. Bing and an accomplice leave the Homestead and join the city government forces, giving them critical secrets about the Homestead along with a traitor who feeds them information from the inside.

Ian's brother Cain, who is also wealthy, arrives via helicopter at Jenna's invitation. Their relationship is strained as Cain urges a firmer stance against the refugees and threats in town and threatens to take control from Jenna. The Homestead comes under direct attack and key residents are killed. Cain agitates the Homesteaders to turn against Jeff as Jeff questions Jenna's leadership.

A radical religious sect in town led by a man called Father Burnham, who has a few congregants among the Homesteaders, claims Ian Ross promised their church a quarter of the Homestead's supplies in the event of a collapse. He allies with Masterson and Raven Rock to agitate outsiders against the Homesteaders. The city government engages in skirmishes with the Homesteaders to test their defenses. Tara becomes disillusioned with Jenna also and she and Jeff consider whether to try to take over the Homestead. They reach a breaking point after their son is injured by a snakebite. Masterson and Bing invite Jeff to join their side. Burnham tries to convince members of his congregation who are Homesteaders to turn against Jenna.

As threats grow, the Homesteaders wrestle with moral choices as they try to prepare for an inevitable attack by Raven Rock. They try to recruit people from town to fight in exchange for food. Abe clashes with Jeff, who is trying to determine how best to lead his family. As the Homesteaders anticipate the impending attack, various members must decide whose side they are on and what they will do.

== Main cast and characters ==
- Dawn Olivieri as Jenna Ross, Ian's wife who is next in line for control of the Homestead after Ian is incapacitated but struggles to assert command. She must decide whether and how to be generous the Homestead's resources with outsiders while balancing the needs of the insiders.
- Charles Esten as Cain Ross, Ian's wealthy brother with a shady past who is invited by Jenna after Ian's injury. He considers Jeff a threat and wants Jenna to run the Homestead with a tighter grip and threatens to take over control if she does not keep Jeff in line.
- Olivia Sanabia as Claire Ross, Jenna's young adult daughter who develops a romance with Abe. She must help her mother while also making her own moral decisions.
- Bailey Chase as Jeff Eriksson, the former U.S. Army Special Forces soldier and DEA agent who commands the Homestead's security personnel. His clashes with Jenna and Cain over decisions threaten the stability of the Homestead, and his concern over protecting his family leads him to make his own choice of whether to remain there or join Raven Rock.
- Kearran Giovanni as Tara Eriksson, Jeff's wife and an Army veteran, who forges a friendship with Jenna which is tested as Jeff challenges Jenna and Cain.
- Tyler Lofton as Abe Eriksson, Jeff and Tara's son and Clare's love interest. He struggles with becoming a man and is torn between his loyalties to his parents and Clare.
- Georgie Snow White as Georgie Eriksson, Jeff and Tara's adopted daughter who experiences strange visions and lives with a sense of foreboding.
- Jesse Hutch as Evan Lee, a special forces veteran and longtime friend of Jeff who objects to some of Jeff's decisions and has to decide whether to remain loyal to him.
- Jill Wagner as Jacq Reynolds, a therapist who is pregnant and tries to help members of the Homestead grapple with their choices. She supports Jenna but rejects her religious faith.
- Manny McCord as Bing, a wild card security team member who leaves the Homestead and joins Raven Rock.
- Currie Graham as Blake Masterson, a city government official who asserts control of the city and sets up a FEMA camp. He shot Ian in the film and gathered FEMA operatives, gang members, and thugs to assemble a force to attack the Homestead.
- Ariel Llinas as Lieutenant Javi Espada, the Oakwood SWAT team leader who tries to urge Masterson to restraint but becomes more militant against the Homestead as events develop.

== Production ==
The Homestead film functioned like a pilot for the series. The full first season was intended for release after the film, but weather conditions on set in Utah delayed production so long that only the first two episodes could be filmed before production was halted. The first two episodes were released concurrently on the Angel streaming app when the film was released. After the film grossed over $20 million in a limited box office release, Angel Studios approved a new production of the rest of the first season and the second season. The remaining episodes of the first season were filmed in the summer of 2025 and production of the second season began in November 2025.

The series is filmed at a real homestead compound in Bountiful, Utah, owned by Jason Orvis, who wrote the Black Autumn books on which the series is based along with retired Green Beret veteran Jeff Kirkham. The real home and land are used for most shots.

In November 2025, Angel Studios acquired the intellectual property rights to Homestead from Orvis.

== Release ==
The first two episodes were released on the Angel streaming platform alongside the theatrical debut of the film. After the rest of season 1 was completed, episode 3 was released on November 26, 2025, with weekly releases thereafter concluding with the season finale on December 25, 2025.

As of November 2025, prior to the release of the remainder of season 1, the Homestead film and series had been watched on the Angel app for more than 81 million minutes, and Angel Studios said over a quarter million people had subscribed to the platform to watch the show.
