= Roadhouse 66 =

1984 film directed by John Mark Robinson

- DVD cover for Roadhouse 66
- Directed by: John Mark Robinson
- Written by: Galen Lee; George Simpson
- Produced by: Mark Levinson
- Starring: Willem Dafoe; Judge Reinhold
- Cinematography: Thomas E. Ackerman
- Edited by: Jay Cassidy
- Music by: Gary S. Scott
- Distributed by: Atlantic Releasing Corporation
- Release date: 8 April 1984
- Running time: 90 minutes
- Country: United States
- Language: English

Roadhouse 66 is a 1984 American road drama film directed by John Mark Robinson and starring Willem Dafoe, Judge Reinhold, Kate Vernon and Stephen Elliott. The film is set entirely in Kingman, Arizona, and Oatman, Arizona, two towns on the historic U.S. Route 66.

== Synopsis ==
A young businessman (Beckman) from New York city, is driving his '55 T-bird to Palm Springs, Ca. to purchase a chain of fast-food pork restaurants. While in Arizona, he runs into trouble with some local hoodlums (Hoot, Dink & Moss) outside Kingman, who shoot at his car's radiator and leave him stranded on the highway. He hooks up with a hitchhiker (Johnny) who helps him fix his car and make it into town. While waiting for a new radiator to be delivered, Beckman and Johnny meet two young sisters, Jesse and Melissa, at a local bar called The Roadhouse. The sisters recognize Johnny as a former rock and roll musician. With no money between them, Beckman and Johnny sleep in a car at the local wrecking yard but get caught by the owner Sam. The trio strike up a friendship with Sam helping them find parts for Beckman's car.

The hoodlums from the highway reappear at The Roadhouse and tensions flare. No townsfolk appear to ever stand up to Hoot and his pals, so Johnny and Beckman attempt to set things right, which culminates in their entry in an automobile race, the 'Roadhouse 66' from Kingman to Oatman and back, which Hoot has won for the past 3 years. With Sam supplying the parts, Johnny and Beckman beef up the T-bird for the race. When Hoot hears about this, he sets the garage where the T-bird is kept, on fire and kills Sam in the process.

Jesse lets Beckman drive her Ford Mustang in the race and tells him that Dink & Moss will drive him off the road to make sure Hoot wins. At the last moment, Johnny pulls up driving Moss' car. Typical hi-jinks unfold ending with Hoot flipping his car, Beckman wrecking the Mustang's engine and Johnny winning. Johnny and Jesse go to Phoenix together to restart his music career, while Beckman takes Melissa with him to Palm Springs.

== Cast ==
- Willem Dafoe as Johnny Harte
- Judge Reinhold as Beckman Hallsgood Jr.
- Kaaren Lee as Jesse Duran
- Kate Vernon as Melissa Duran
- Stephen Elliott as Sam
- Alan Autry as Hoot
- Kevyn Major Howard as Dink
- Peter Van Norden as Moss
- Erica Yohn as Thelma
- James Intveld as James Fury
- Katie Graves as Mary Lou
