= Dangerous Touch =

1994 American film directed by Lou Diamond Phillips

- VHS cover
- Directed by: Lou Diamond Phillips
- Written by: Kurt Voss; Lou Diamond Phillips
- Produced by: Lisa M. Hansen
- Starring: Lou Diamond Phillips; Kate Vernon
- Cinematography: James Lemmo
- Edited by: Christopher Rouse
- Music by: Terry Plumeri
- Production companies: CineTel Films; Trimark Pictures
- Release date: October 12, 1994
- Running time: 97 minutes
- Country: United States
- Language: English

Dangerous Touch is a 1994 American erotic thriller film directed by Lou Diamond Phillips (in his directorial debut) and written by Kurt Voss and Phillips. It stars Phillips and Kate Vernon. It was released direct-to-video on October 12, 1994.

The main themes of the film are blackmail and amateur pornography. A female radio host has an ill-advised sexual relationship with a hustler. He has videotaped their sexual encounters, and threatens to publicize them.

== Plot ==
Radiotherapist Amanda Grace's life turns hellish after she becomes involved with young hustler Mick Burroughs. Mick seduces the radio host to get hold of a file she has on a criminal who also happens to be one of her patients. Soon, the two are having steamy, erotic encounters that include kinky sex. But she gets so caught up in their relationship that she leaves herself wide open to Mick's treachery. Amanda finds her entire career in jeopardy when Mick blackmails her and threatens to show everyone an incriminating videotape of them having sex, which also involved a female prostitute if she doesn't do whatever he says.

== Cast ==
- Kate Vernon as Amanda Grace
- Lou Diamond Phillips as Mick Burroughs
- Andrew Divoff as Johnnie
- Tom Dugan as Freddie
- Max Gail as Jasper Stone
- Ira Heiden as Benny
- Karla Montana as Maria
- Monique Parent as Nicole
- Mitch Pileggi as Vince
- Adam Roarke as Robert Turner
- Berlinda Tolbert as Sasha T

== Production ==
Kate Vernon admits she passed on the project "the first time I saw the script because the material was so erotic and strong it frightened me. I hadn't done any major sex scenes before, and I just said no." Later she said yes - after being assured by Lou Diamond Phillips that the sexual content and the nudity would be handled artistically."
