= Mob Story =

1990 film

- Directed by: Gabriel Markiw; Jancarlo Markiw
- Written by: David Flaherty; Gabriel Markiw
- Produced by: Phil Good; Don Haig
- Starring: John Vernon; Kate Vernon; Al Waxman; Margot Kidder
- Cinematography: Gilles Corbeil
- Edited by: Michael Todd
- Music by: Paul Zaza
- Distributed by: Cineplex Odeon Films
- Release date: November 24, 1989
- Running time: 94 minutes
- Country: Canada
- Language: English

Mob Story is a 1989 Canadian comedy film starring John Vernon, Kate Vernon, Al Waxman and Margot Kidder.

== Plot ==
The story is about a New York gangster who is forced to go on the run and hides out in the small town where he grew up.

== Cast ==
- John Vernon as Don "Luce" Luciano
- Kate Vernon as Mindy
- Al Waxman as Sam
- Margot Kidder as Dolores
- Diana Barrington as Maria
- Robert Morelli as Gianni

== Production ==
It was filmed in Winnipeg, Manitoba, Canada.

== Crew ==
- Peter Lhotka Assistant Production Manager
- Gilles Corbeil, Cinematography
- Michael Todd, Editor
