= Kearran Giovanni =

American actress

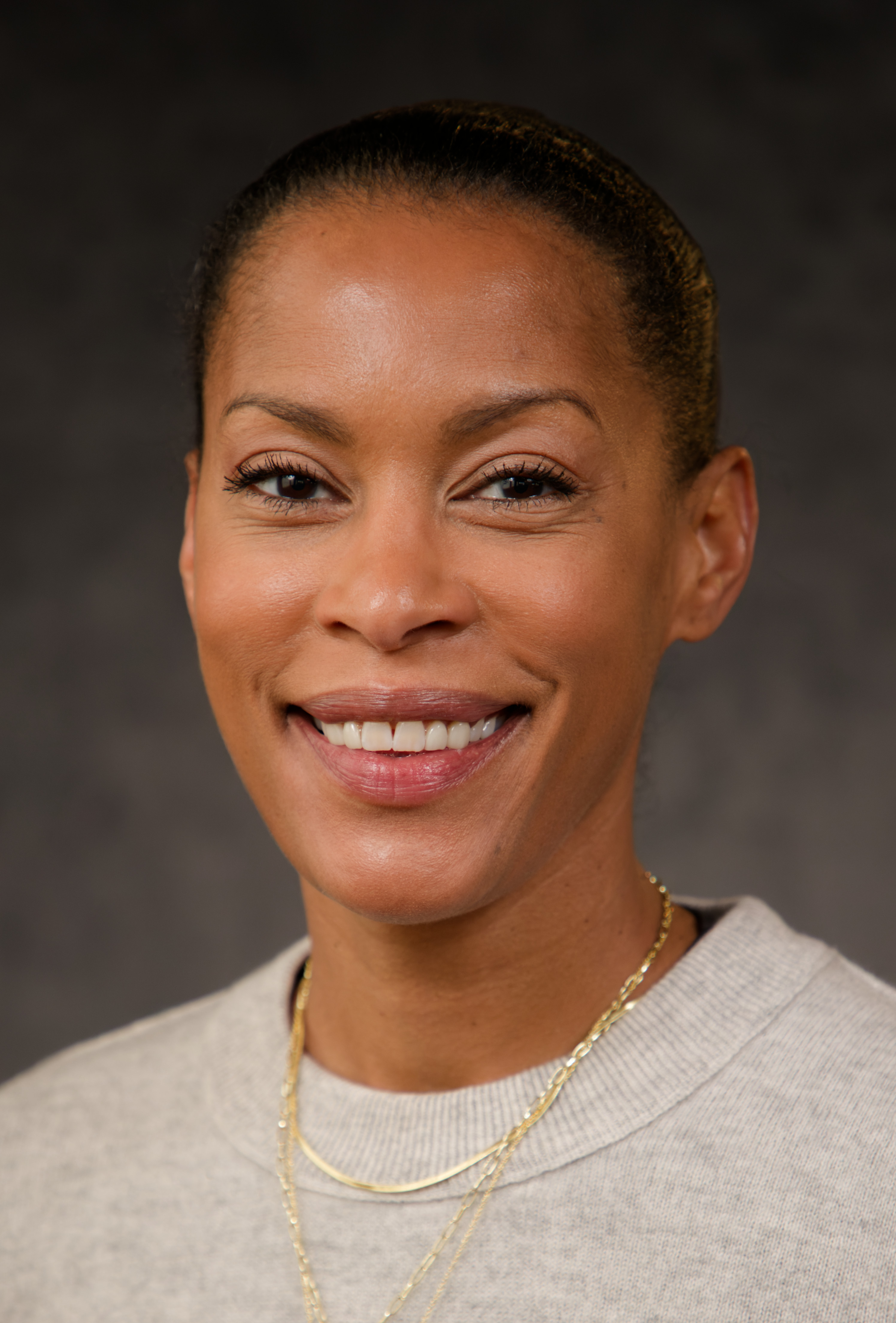
- Giovanni in 2025
- Born: Lafayette, Louisiana, U.S.
- Occupation: Actress
- Years active: 2004–present
- Spouse: Philip Ambrosino
- Children: 2

Kearran Giovanni is an American actress, best known for her role as Detective Amy Sykes in the TNT police procedural series Major Crimes.

== Life and career ==
Giovanni was born in Lafayette, Louisiana and raised in Katy, Texas. She attended The High School for the Performing and Visual Arts in Houston, Texas and later the University of Cincinnati – College-Conservatory of Music. In 2004, she moved to New York and began her career on Broadway, appearing in the ensemble of Hugh Jackman: Back on Broadway, Catch Me If You Can, Guys and Dolls, Sweet Charity, and Tarzan.

Giovanni played Dr. Vivian Wright, a recurring role on the ABC daytime soap opera One Life to Live from 2009 to the series finale in 2012. In February 2012, Giovanni won her first series regular role as Detective Amy Sykes in the TNT police procedural series Major Crimes. She also guest-starred on USA Network's Royal Pains in 2012, and on The CW's Beauty and the Beast in 2013.

In 2016, Giovanni had a recurring role as Senator Diane Hunter in the ABC political drama series Designated Survivor. Following the conclusion of Major Crimes in 2018, Giovanni guest-starred on The CW series Dynasty and the CBS series Bull, before recurring on the second season of the CW's Black Lightning as Cutter.

In September 2026, she was cast as Dr. Nichols on the ABC soap opera General Hospital.

== Filmography ==
Year	Title	Role	Notes
2004	Law and Order	Actress #2	Episode: "All in the Family"
2009–12	One Life to Live	Dr. Vivian Wright	31 episodes
2012	Royal Pains	Greeter	Episode: "A Farewell to Barnes"
2012–18	Major Crimes	Detective Amy Sykes	Main cast
2013	Beauty and the Beast	Miranda Bishop	Episode: "Tough Love"
2017	Designated Survivor	Senator Diane Hunter	2 episodes
2018	Dynasty	Police Chief Bobbi Johnson	Episode: "I Answer to No Man"
2018	Bull	Lindsey Erikson	Episode: "The Missing Piece"
2018–19	Black Lightning	Cutter	Recurring role (season 2)
2019–20	The Resident	Andrea Braydon	Recurring role (season 3)
2020	American Soul	Ruby Daniels	Recurring role (season 2)
2020–21	All Rise	Kiara Foster	2 episodes
2022–23	The Rookie: Feds	Evelyn Hope	3 episodes
2022–24	Walker	Kelly	Recurring role (seasons 2–4)
2024	Homestead	Tara Eriksson	Feature film debut
2024–present	Homestead: The Series	Tara Eriksson	Recurring role (season 1)
2026	General Hospital	Dr. Nichols	Recurring
