= Peter Van Norden =

American actor (1950–2026)

- Van Norden in The Naked Gun 2½: The Smell of Fear, 1991
- Born: Peter Edward Van Norden; December 16, 1950; New York City, U.S.
- Died: July 9, 2026 (aged 75); San Diego, California, U.S.
- Education: Colgate University
- Occupation: Actor
- Years active: 1975–2025
- Spouse: Wendy Edith Van Norden

Peter Edward Van Norden (December 16, 1950 – July 9, 2026) was an American actor. He is best known for his roles in Hollywood films of the 1980s and 1990s, including Police Academy 2: Their First Assignment (1985), The Accused (1988), and The Stand (1994), among others.

== Background ==
Van Norden was born in New York City on December 16, 1950. He graduated magna cum laude from Colgate University.

He was married to Wendy Van Norden. The couple had a son named Robert. Peter Van Norden died in Southern California on July 9, 2026, at the age of 75.

== Filmography ==
=== Film ===
Year	Title	Role	Notes
1979	Squeeze Play!	Beauty Parlor Manager	
1980	Headin' for Broadway	Auditioner	
1981	Waitress!	Policeman	
1984	Hard to Hold	Casserole	
1984	Roadhouse 66	Moss	
1985	Police Academy 2: Their First Assignment	Officer Vinnie Schtulman	
1988	The Accused	Paulsen	
1991	The Naked Gun 2½: The Smell of Fear	John Sununu	
2003	Gigli	Morgue Attendant	

=== Television ===
Year	Title	Role	Notes
1982	Cheers	Cymbals Player	Episode: "Friends, Romans, and Accountants"
1982–1983	St. Elsewhere	Patient / Bill Fulkerson	2 episodes
1982	T. J. Hooker	Lenny	Episode: "Thieves' Highway"
1983	Malibu	Bumbo	TV movie
1983	Blood Feud	Pierre Salinger	TV movie
1985	Three's a Crowd	Herbert Potts	Episode: "A Friend in Deed"
1985	Silver Spoons	Larry	Episode: "All the Principal's Men"
1985	Family Ties	Janitor	Episode: "The Real Thing: Part 2"
1989–1996	Murder, She Wrote	Henryk Stuyvesant / Dr. Sid Lantz / CIA Agt. Dennis Quinlan	3 episodes
1990	In the Heat of the Night	Sgt. D'Agostino	2 episodes
1991	Matlock	Nick Saddler	Episode: "The Suspect"
1994	The Stand	Ralph Brentner	Miniseries; 4 episodes

== Stage ==
Theatre credits
Year	Title	Role	Venue	Refs.
1975	Measure for Measure	Escalus	Classic Stage Company, Off-Broadway	
1975	A Country Scandal	Count Partin, Semeonovich Glagolaev	Classic Stage Company, Off-Broadway	
1975	Antigone	Durand	Classic Stage Company, Off-Broadway	
1976	The Hound of the Baskervilles	Dr. John Watson	Classic Stage Company, Off-Broadway	
1976	Tartuffe	Orgon	Classic Stage Company, Off-Broadway	
1976	The Balcony	Bishop	Classic Stage Company, Off-Broadway	
1977	Romeo and Juliet	Abram, Friar John, Watchman	Circle in the Square, Broadway	
1977	Saint Joan	Bertrand de Poulengey	Circle in the Square, Broadway	
1978	The Inspector General	Stepán Illyích Ukhovyórtov, Merchant	Circle in the Square, Broadway	
1981	Macbeth	Scottish Doctor, Old Man, Murderer	Vivian Beaumont Theater, Broadway	
1981	Little Johnny Jones	Anthony Anstey	US national tour	
1982	Little Johnny Jones	Anthony Anstey	Alvin Theatre, Broadway	
1986	Hamlet	First Gravedigger, Gentleman	The Public Theater, Off-Broadway	
1990	The Last Pad	Archie	Friends and Artists Theatre, Los Angeles	
1994	The Cradle Will Rock	Mr. Mister	Off Ramp Theatre, Los Angeles	
1997	Nixon's Nixon	Henry Kissinger	San Jose Repertory Theatre	
1997	Loot	Truscott	Blank Theatre Company, Hollywood	
1998	Mizlansky/Zilinsky	Zilinsky	San Jose Repertory Theatre	
1998	Nixon's Nixon	Henry Kissinger	Seattle Repertory Theatre	
1999	The Magic Fire	Giovanni, Juan Guarneri	Berkeley Repertory Theatre	
1999	The Magic Fire	Giovanni, Juan Guarneri	Old Globe Theatre, San Diego	
1999	Cymbeline	Cymbeline	Old Globe Theatre, San Diego	
2000	Love's Labour's Lost	Holofernes	Old Globe Theatre, San Diego	
2000	Enter the Guardsman	The Playwright	San Jose Repertory Theatre	
2001	Camping With Henry and Tom	Warren G. Harding	La Mirada Theatre, California	
2003	Mr. Shaw Goes to Hollywood	Billy, John Barrymore	Laguna Playhouse, California	
2003	Misalliance	John Tartleton	Center Stage, Baltimore	
2005	The Wild Party	Gold	Hudson Theatre Mainstage, Los Angeles	
2006	Moonlight and Magnolias	Ben Hecht	Intiman Theatre, Seattle	
2007	Don Quixote	Quixote	San Diego Repertory Theatre	
2007	Nixon's Nixon	Henry Kissinger	San Jose Repertory Theatre	
2008	Desperate Writers	Leo Goldberg	Edgemar Center for the Arts, California	
2009	Groundswell	Smith	San Jose Repertory Theatre	
2010	Top Secret: The Battle for the Pentagon Papers	Fritz Beebe, Henry Kissinger	New York Theatre Workshop, Off-Broadway	
2010	Hairspray	Edna Turnblad	San Diego Repertory Theatre	
2011	The Cradle Will Rock	Mr. Mister	Stella Adler Theatre, Los Angeles	
2012	Macbeth	Duncan	Antaeus Theatre Company, Los Angeles	
2013	The Sunshine Boys	Willie Clark	Arizona Theatre Company	
2013	The Liar	Géronte	Antaeus Theatre Company, Los Angeles	
2014	Flim Flam: Houdini And The Hereafter	Arthur Conan Doyle	Malibu Playhouse, California	
2014	Othello	Brabantio	Odyssey Theatre Ensemble, Los Angeles	
2015	Serrano: The Musical	Don Reyes	Matrix Theatre, Los Angeles	
2015	Copenhagen	Niels Bohr	Rubicon Theatre, California	
2015	A Christmas Carol	Scrooge	Rubicon Theatre, California	
2016	King Charles III	Charles III (Van Norden was the first American actor to play the role)	Arizona Theatre Company	
2016	A Christmas Carol	Scrooge	Rubicon Theatre, California	
2017	Taking Sides	Wilhelm Furtwängler	Rubicon Theatre, California	
2017	A Christmas Carol	Scrooge	Rubicon Theatre, California	
2018	The Hothouse	Roote	Antaeus Theatre Company, Los Angeles	
2018	Henry IV	Performer Standby for Tom Hanks as Falstaff	Shakespeare Center of Los Angeles	
2018	1776	Benjamin Franklin	La Mirada Theatre, California	
2019	Singin' in the Rain	R.F. Simpson	La Mirada Theatre, California	
2019	It's a Wonderful Life: A Live Radio Play	Freddie Filmore, Mr. Potter, Bill Bailey, others	Ensemble Theatre Company, Santa Barbara	
2020	Red Ink	performer	Atwater Village Theatre, Los Angeles	
2023	The Tempest	Gonzalo	Shakespeare Center of Los Angeles	
2023	The Tempest	Prospero	Antaeus Theatre Company, Los Angeles	
2024	Misalliance	John Tartleton	A Noise Within, California	
2025	Corktown '39	Joe	Matrix Theatre, Los Angeles	

== Notes ==
1. Adaptation combining Shakespeare's Henry IV, Part 1 and Henry IV, Part 2
