= Hysterical Blindness (Heroes) =

- Heroes episode
- Gretchen Berg (Madeline Zima) reveals her true feelings for Claire.
- Episode no.: Season 4 Episode 5
- Directed by: SJ Clarkson
- Written by: Joe Pokaski
- Production code: 405
- Original air date: October 12, 2009

Guest appearances
- Robert Knepper as Samuel Sullivan; Louise Fletcher as Dr. Coolidge; Madeline Zima as Gretchen Berg; Ray Park as Edgar; Dawn Olivieri as Lydia; Deanne Bray as Emma Coolidge; Christine Adams as Madeline Gibson; Tessa Thompson as Becky Taylor; Rachel Melvin as Annie; Ernie Hudson as Captain Lubbock; Jack Wallace as Arnold

Episode chronology
← Previous "Acceptance"	Next → "Tabula Rasa"
- Heroes season 1

"Hysterical Blindness" is the fifth episode of the fourth season of the NBC superhero drama series Heroes and sixty-third episode overall. The episode aired on October 12, 2009.

== Plot ==
Sylar crawls from his shallow grave and is picked up by the Baltimore Police after being found wandering. Police psychologist Dr. Madelyn Gibson diagnoses him with amnesia and possible aphasia. She begins working with him on his memory but the police soon identify him as murder suspect Gabriel Gray.

Samuel declares to the family that a new member will be joining that day. Lydia cautions him against making promises he may not be able to keep, but Samuel trusts that the feeling in his bones will prove to be correct.

Claire and Gretchen are invited by Psi Alpha Chi rush chair Becky Taylor to rush the sorority. They make a good impression and are invited back for the mixer that evening. Just before they leave for the dance, Claire discovers information about her, her past, Annie's death and the concept of murder-suicide on Gretchen's computer. At the party, Claire and another girl are almost impaled on a falling flagstaff; only Gretchen appears near enough to have dropped it.

Peter tries to reconnect with Angela but is unsuccessful. On his way to work he saves Emma, disoriented by her newly manifesting abilities, from being hit by a bus and inadvertently mimics her ability. He finds her later at the hospital and explains about her ability and the two play a piano duet. He asks her to lunch the next day but she is put off when he jokes about getting her out of the file room.

After the mixer Gretchen returns to her dorm room and assures Claire that she did not drop the flagstaff. Claire confronts her about the information on her computer and Gretchen kisses her, confessing that she has a crush on Claire. Moments later, the sorority sisters arrive and offer them each a bid to join the sorority.

Sylar escapes from custody through an instinctive use of telekinesis and carjacks the psychiatrist. He releases her but the police are on his trail. They shoot him but he heals and flees.

At the carnival Samuel and Lydia try to form a tattoo of the new member but are unsuccessful. Samuel flings a rag which stops in mid-air, leading Samuel to realize that another family member has arrived invisibly. It is Becky Taylor, who has been acting under Samuel's orders to isolate Claire. It was Becky who dropped the flagstaff and she who pushed Annie out of the dorm window. He sends her back to the college as Lydia is now able to reveal the new family member.

At her apartment, Emma plays the cello. As her playing intensifies, the generated light damages the walls. At Peter's apartment, Hiro teleports in and collapses.

As he runs through the woods, Sylar encounters Samuel and the carnival. With the entire carnival cloaked in the illusion of invisibility, Samuel informs Sylar that he has come home.

== Production ==
"Hysterical Blindness" includes a kiss between Claire Bennett (Hayden Panettiere) and new character Gretchen Berg (Madeline Zima). Panettiere, who has acknowledged "experimenting" with female friends as a teenager, persuaded the creators to include the storyline: "I kinda threw it out there. The writers put you in relationships and I was like, 'Can I just be with a girl or something? Let's do that.' So they took it and ran with it." Heroes had previously planned a lesbian cheerleader character in 2007, April, but the actress playing April, Lyndsy Fonseca, took a job on the ABC series Desperate Housewives after just one Heroes appearance and the part was not re-cast.

NBC premiered two short films during the episode. The first, a 60-second film starring Masi Oka and directed by Milo Ventimiglia, was made in conjunction with the "Responsibility Project", an initiative of the Liberty Mutual Group to promote personal responsibility. The second advanced an interactive storyline and featured a girl with pyrokinesis.

== Critical reception ==
"Hysterical Blindness" was watched by 5.6 million viewers. This represented no increase from its previous week's ratings. The episode finished fourth in its time slot, behind Dancing With the Stars on ABC, House on Fox and the sitcoms How I Met Your Mother and Accidentally On Purpose on CBS.

The episode itself, however, received several positive reviews. IGN's Robert Canning gave the episode an 8.5, saying that it was reminiscent of Season 1. Entertainment Weekly's Marc Bernardin praised Deanne Bray as Emma and said that the episode "had moments of grace that gave [him] hope for Heroes' future".

Steve Heisler of The A.V. Club rated this episode a D+.
