= Olivia Sanabia =

American actress and singer

- Born: Olivia Shae Sanabia; April 13, 2003 (age 23); Corona, California, U.S.
- Occupations: Actress; singer
- Years active: 2009–present

Olivia Shae Sanabia (born April 13, 2003) is an American actress and singer. Her most well known acting roles include her lead role as Kelly Quinn in the Amazon Studios series Just Add Magic (2016–2019), her main role as Charlotte Wrather in the Disney Channel series Coop & Cami Ask the World (2018–2020), and her role as Claire Ross in the Angel Studios film Homestead (2024) and its follow-up television series (2024–present).

== Biography ==
=== Early years ===
Olivia Sanabia was born on April 13, 2003, in Corona, California. Her first time acting was in musical theater at the age of 6. She has performed in notable titles such as Annie (as Annie), Anastasia, Seussical, Fiddler on the Roof, and many more. Sanabia did a commercial with Jennifer Garner at the age of 8. She has appeared in numerous commercials for companies such as Disney, Nickelodeon and Ford.

=== Acting ===
Sanabia has guest starred on television series such as Incredible Crew, Extant, Sam & Cat and The Birthday Boys. From 2016 to 2019, she starred as Kelly Quinn in the Amazon Studios television series Just Add Magic, for which she was nominated for a Young Artist Award for Best Performance in a TV Series, reprising the role in the 2020 spin-off series Just Add Magic: Mystery City in a guest role. From 2018 to 2020 she played Charlotte Wrather in the Disney Channel series Coop & Cami Ask the World. She played Claire Ross in the 2025 film Homestead, reprising the role in the follow-up television series Homestead: The Series.

=== Music ===
On November 22, 2019, Sanabia released her debut single titled "Stars Crossed". The music video for the single was released on November 28 of the same year and was co-directed by her. In 2020, she recorded and released a single titled "The Train". In November 2021, Sanabia wrote and released her first original Christmas single titled "Evergreen".

== Filmography ==
=== Films ===
Year	Title	Role	Notes
2022	A Nashville Country Christmas	Anna	TV film
2023	Birthright Outlaw	Hope Jacobs	
2024	Homestead	Claire Ross	
TBA	The One	Alexis	
TBA	Day Six	Miriam Scott	

=== Television ===
Year	Title	Role	Notes
2012	Incredible Crew	Lil Sister	Episode: "Pancake Genie"
2013–2014	The Birthday Boys	Daughter	Episodes: "Catching Up on Shows", "Freshy's"
2014	Sam & Cat	Millie	Episode: "#BlooperEpisode"
2014	Extant	Rebecca	Episode: "Wish You Were Here"
2015	Nicky, Ricky, Dicky & Dawn	Jill Milbank	Episode: "Family Matters"
2015	Life in Pieces	Kylie	Episode: "Ponzi Sex Paris Bounce"
2016–2019	Just Add Magic	Kelly Quinn	Lead role
2018–2020	Coop & Cami Ask the World	Charlotte Wrather	Main role
2020	Just Add Magic: Mystery City	Kelly Quinn	Episodes: "Just Add Waffles", "Just Add Goodbyes"
2021	Country Comfort	Luanne	Episode: "Summer Lovin'"
2021	Colin in Black & White	Hailey	Episode: "Crystal"
2022	This Is Us	McKenna	Episode: "Four Fathers"
2023	That '90s Show	Serena	Episodes: "Step by Step", "The Birthday Girl"
2023	NCIS	Serena Zawadski	Episode: "The Stories We Leave Behind"
2024–present	Homestead: The Series	Claire Ross	Main role

== Theater ==
Year	Production	Role	Theater
2019	A Snow White Christmas	Snow White	Pasadena Civic Auditorium

== Discography ==
=== Singles ===
Title	Year	album
Stars Crossed	2019	N/A
The Train	2020	N/A
Evergreen	2021	N/A

== Awards and nominations ==
Year	Award	Category	Work	Result	Ref.
2016	37th Young Artist Awards	Best Performance in a TV Series – Leading Young Actress	Just Add Magic	Nominated	
2016	37th Young Artist Awards	Best Performance in a TV Commercial – Young Actor/Actress	Dairy Queen Rolo Minis Blizzard	Nominated	
