= Kevin Dowling (director) =

American director and producer

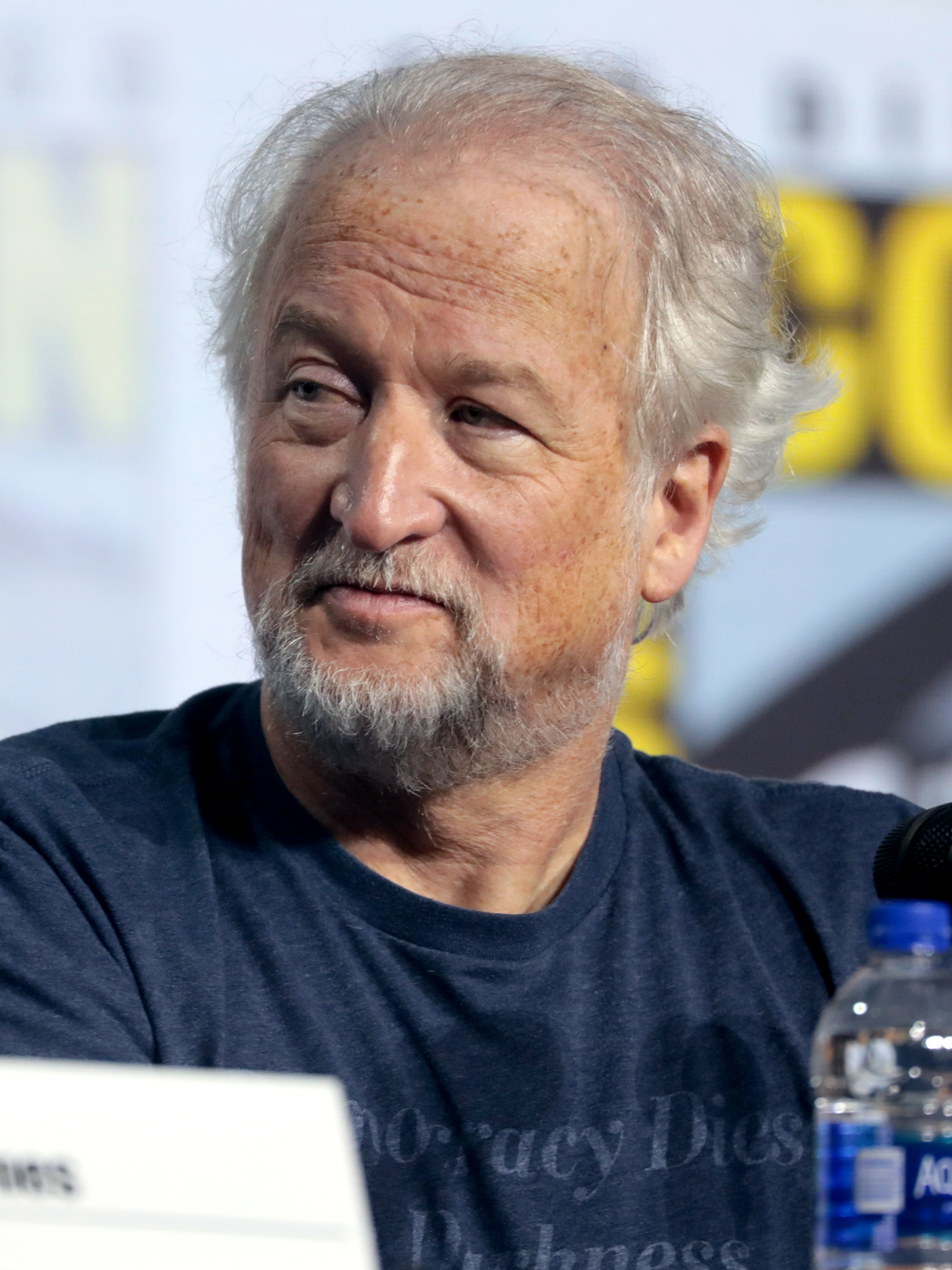
- Dowling at the 2019 San Diego Comic-Con
- Born: Gladwyne, Pennsylvania, U.S.
- Occupations: Film, television director and producer
- Years active: 1987–present

Kevin Dowling is an American film, television director and producer. Throughout his career, Kevin has worked in over 60 projects.

== Biography ==
=== Early life and New York theater ===
Kevin Dowling was raised in Gladwyne, Pennsylvania, a suburb of Philadelphia, the son of Dr. John J. Dowling, who in the late 1980s was chief of orthopedic surgery at the Lankenau Medical Center in Wynnewood, Pennsylvania, and a clinical professor of orthopedic surgery at Thomas Jefferson University; and Lynn Dowling. He attended Oberlin College & Conservatory, in Ohio, and New York University, in New York City. On May 9, 1987, Dowling married Marley Klaus, at the time a producer/writer of the CBS News television program 60 Minutes.

Dowling was a founding member and, for eight years, the artistic director of The Actor's Ensemble. During this time, he directed more than 20 plays, including the first full scale New York production of Lanford Wilson's "This Is The Rill Speaking," the New York premiere of Dan Lauria's "Game Plan," his own "A Child's Piece," and revivals of plays by Harold Pinter and Sam Shepard. He later produced Mr. Shepard's comedy hit "True West," which ran for two years at the Cherry Lane Theatre and featured during its run such actors as: John Malkovich, Gary Sinise, James Belushi, Gary Cole, Randy Quaid, & Dennis Quaid. He also served as Artistic Director of the Cherry Lane Theatre from 1982 to 1995.

Dowling's first show on Broadway was as a producer and director of Larry Shue's who Broadway play The Nerd, which ran 15 previews and 441 performances at the Helen Hayes Theatre from March 10, 1987, to April 10, 1988. Dowling then served as Executive Producer of the Forbidden Broadway 1988/1989 edition of the annual Off-Broadway satirical revue, which ran 534 performances, from September 15, 1988 to December 24, 1989, at Theater East in New York City.

Following these initial works, Dowling directed and produced, David Stevens' Off-Broadway play The Sum of Us, which won the 1991 Outer Critics Circle Award for Best Off-Broadway Play and took a 1991 Obie Award for star Tony Goldwyn. It ran 335 performances from October 16, 1990, to August 4, 1991, at the Cherry Lane Theatre. Dowling then served as Executive Producer of the Off-Broadway musical Pageant, (April 23, 1991 – June 7, 1992), which garnered Outer Critics Circle Award nominations for Best Off-Broadway Musical and Best Off-Broadway Book, Music and Lyrics; and produced the Broadway musical Buddy: The Buddy Holly Story (November 4, 1990 – May 19, 1991), and the Off-Broadway play Hauptman (May 19 – June 14, 1992).

=== Film and TV ===
Dowling made his film directorial debut directing the 1994 movie adaptation The Sum of Us, based on the Australia-set Off-Broadway play Dowling had directed. Despite his experience with the material, Dowling found it difficult to be assigned as director for the movie, which starred Jack Thompson and Russell Crowe. "They were concerned about a first time film director, and they wanted to shoot it [in the United States]. They didn't think it would make any money if it was set in Australia," a locale he "fought to keep". Hoping to raise both American and Australian capital to make the film, Dowling went to Sydney; when his prospective American backer died, Australian sources pressed to have a native direct. To complete the financial arrangements, Dowling accepted a co-directing credit with Australian cinematographer Geoff Burton, and agreed to use an Australian cast.

He went on to direct, and serve as executive producer of, the 1996 film Mojave Moon, starring Danny Aiello, Anne Archer and Angelina Jolie. He then directed the 1998 cable-TV movie Last Rites, starring Randy Quaid and Embeth Davidtz, which premiered on Starz / Encore.

After the 1999 TV-movie Silk Hope came the first of a long string of episodic-TV directing credits, the first-season episode "Near Death Experience" of the drama series Judging Amy. He would direct seven more episodes through season five, as well as episodes of series including The Americans, The Strain, Bosch, Resurrection, Heroes, Outsourced, Dead Like Me, Ed, Gilmore Girls, The District, Joan of Arcadia, Law & Order: Criminal Intent, CSI:NY, and The Mentalist, as well as the pilot and all eight episodes of the 2008–2009 romantic comedy-drama series Valentine, and all episodes except the pilot of the 2007 drama series K-Ville.

He developed the concept and directed the pilot of the 2011 USA Network drama series Necessary Roughness, and was Executive Producer for all three seasons of the series, also directing eight episodes during that time.

== Filmography ==
Year	Title	Director	Producer	Notes
1994	The Sum of Us	Yes	Executive	
1996	Mojave Moon	Yes	Executive	
1998	Four Corners	Yes	No	Episode "Lives of Their Own"
1999-2000	Early Edition	Yes	No	2 episodes
1999-2003	Judging Amy	Yes	No	8 episodes
2000	The Magnificent Seven	Yes	No	Episode "Obsession"
2000-2002	Ed	Yes	Executive	6 episodes; Also wrote 1 episode
2001	Dead Last	Yes	No	3 episodes
2001-2002	Touched by an Angel	Yes	No	3 episodes
2001-2003	The District	Yes	No	4 episodes
2002	Gilmore Girls	Yes	No	Episode "Back in the Saddle Again"
2002	That Was Then	Yes	No	Episode "A Rock and a Head Case"
2003	Dead Like Me	Yes	No	2 episodes
2003-2004	Dragnet	Yes	No	3 episodes
2003-2005	Joan of Arcadia	Yes	No	6 episodes
2004	Law & Order: Criminal Intent	Yes	No	Episode "Silver Lining"
2005	Inconceivable	Yes	No	Episode "Sex, Lies & Sonograms"
2005	One Tree Hill	Yes	No	2 episodes
2005-2007	Close to Home	Yes	Yes	6 episodes
2006	E-Ring	Yes	No	Episode "Two Princes"
2006	Related	Yes	No	Episode "London Calling"
2006	CSI: NY	Yes	No	Episode "Fare Game"
2006	The Jake Effect	Yes	No	Episode "Parent Teacher Conference"
2006	Just Legal	Yes	No	Episode "The Bar"
2007	Jericho	Yes	No	Episode "Winter's End"
2007-2008	K-Ville	Yes	Supervising	1 episode
2007-2013	Army Wives	Yes	No	6 episodes
2008-2009	Reaper	Yes	No	3 episodes
2008-2009	Valentine	Yes	Supervising	3 episodes
2009	The Mentalist	Yes	No	Episode "Carnelian Inc."
2009	Heroes	Yes	No	Episode "The Fifth Stage"
2010	Past Life	Yes	No	1 episode
2010	Drop Dead Diva	Yes	No	Episode "Home Away From Home"
2010	Memphis Beat	Yes	No	Episode "Baby, Let's Play House"
2010	Sons of Tucson	Yes	No	2 episodes
2011	Outsourced	Yes	No	Episode "Charlie Curries a Favor From Todd"
2011-2013	Necessary Roughness	Yes	Executive	8 episodes
2012	Free Agents	Yes	No	Episode "Sexin' the Raisin"
2012	Go On	Yes	No	2 episodes
2012	Wedding Band	Yes	No	Episode "Get Down on It"
2013	Nashville	Yes	No	Episode "I'm Tired of Pretending"
2014	Royal Pains	Yes	No	Episode "Smoke and Mirrors"
2014	The Night Shift	Yes	No	Episode "Grace Under Fire"
2014	Rizzoli & Isles	Yes	No	Episode "Doomsday"
2014	Resurrection	Yes	No	2 episodes
2014-2015	Extant	Yes	No	3 episodes
2014-2016	The Americans	Yes	No	4 episodes
2015-2016	Bosch	Yes	Consulting	3 episodes
2015-2017	The Strain	Yes	No	4 episodes
2016	The Catch	Yes	Co-Executive	2 episodes
2017	Kevin (Probably) Saves the World	Yes	No	Episode "Listen Up"
2017-2019	The Son	Yes	Executive	5 episodes
2018	Madam Secretary	Yes	No	Episode "Baby Steps"
2019	For the People	Yes	No	Episode "This Is America"
2019	13 Reasons Why	Yes	No	4 episodes
2019	Mayans M.C.	Yes	Executive	2 episodes
2020	Evel	Yes	No	1 episode
2021	The Walking Dead	Yes	No	2 episodes
2022	Charmed	Yes	No	Episode: "Not That Girl"
2023	The Walking Dead: Dead City	Yes	No	2 episodes
2023-2024	FBI: International	Yes	No	2 episodes

TV movies

- Last Rites (1998)
- Silk Hope (1999)
- The Last Dance (2000)
