= Dawn Olivieri =

American actress

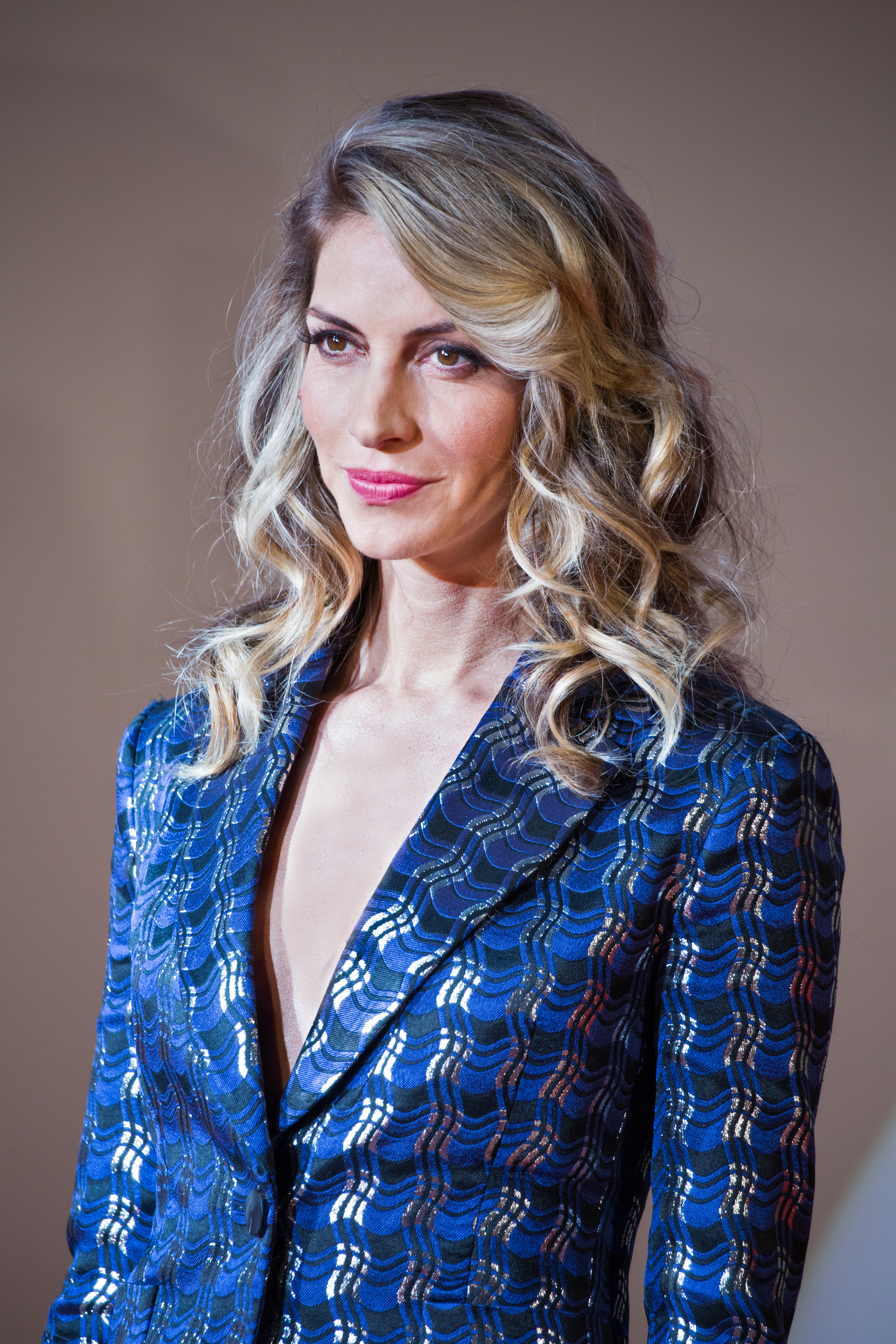
- Olivieri in 2017
- Occupation: Actress
- Years active: 2004—present

Dawn Olivieri is an American actress. She played Lydia in Heroes, and Monica Talbot in House of Lies.

Olivieri is a frequent participant in Taylor Sheridan produced television productions. She portrayed Claire Dutton in 1883, Sarah Atwood in Yellowstone, and Amber Whalen in Lioness.

== Filmography ==
=== Film ===
Year	Title	Role	Notes
2006	The Devil's Den	Jezebel	
2010	Dozers	Ashley	
2010	Drop Dead Gorgeous	Brooke	Direct-to-video film
2011	Boy Toy	Kylie	Direct-to-video film
2013	Missionary	Katherine Kingsman	
2013	Plush	Annie	
2013	American Hustle	Cosmo Girl	
2014	Supremacy	Doreen Lesser	
2014	To Whom It May Concern	Anna	
2015	The Last Witch Hunter	Danique	
2017	Bright	Sherri Ward	
2017	A Change of Heart	Laurie	
2018	Den of Thieves	Debbie O'Brien	
2018	Traffik	Cara	
2018	Darc	Ivy	
2022	Double Threat	Ask	
2023	Young, Sexy and Dead	Brooke	
2024	Homestead	Jenna Ross	
TBA	Behind the Curtain of Night	Adrian / Nicole	Post-production

=== Television ===
Year	Title	Role	Notes
2004	The Player	Herself	
2005	CSI: Crime Scene Investigation	Stripper	Episode: "Bodies in Motion"
2005	Deal or No Deal	Model #14	5 episodes
2006	Las Vegas	Sheri	Episode: "Urban Legends"
2006	Veronica Mars	Maggie	Episode: "The Quick and the Wed"
2006, 2008	How I Met Your Mother	Anna	Episodes: "Ted Mosby, Architect", "The Bracket"
2008	Stargate: Atlantis	Neeva Casol	Episode: "Identity"
2009	Xtra Credit	Lexy	Television movie
2009	Hydra	Gwen Russell	Television movie
2009	Cold Case	Vonda Martin	Episode: "Hoodrats"
2009	Entourage	Costume Fitting Girl	Episode: "Security Briefs"
2009–2010	Heroes	Lydia	Recurring role (season 4), 16 episodes
2010	True Blood	Janice Herveaux	Episode: "9 Crimes"
2010	Rules of Engagement	Cheyenne	Episode: "Refusing to Budget"
2010, 2012	The Avengers: Earth's Mightiest Heroes	Pepper Potts	Voice role, 4 episodes
2011	The Vampire Diaries	Andie Star	Recurring role (season 2), 5 episodes
2011	Californication	Actress Karen	Episode: "... And Justice for All"
2012–2016	House of Lies	Monica Talbot	Main role (seasons 1–3); recurring role (seasons 4–5)
2015	Secrets and Lies	Detective Felicia Sanchez	Recurring role (season 2)
2016	Lucifer	Lieutenant Olivia Monroe	Episodes: "Manly Whatnots", "Sweet Kicks"
2016	Rosewood	FBI Agent Harrows	Episode: "Bacterium & the Brothers Panitch"
2018	SEAL Team	Amy Nelson	8 episodes
2021	The Hot Zone: Anthrax	Dani Torretti	4 episodes
2021	1883	Claire Dutton	2 episodes
2022–2024	Yellowstone	Sarah Atwood	10 episodes
2023	NCIS: Hawaiʻi	Melina Devin	Episode: "Deep Fake"
2024	Lioness	Amber Whalen	2 episodes
2024-present	Homestead: The Series	Jenna Ross	Main cast
2026	The Madison	Ellen	season 1 episode 6

=== Web Series ===
Year	Title	Role	Notes
2008	Takedown	Jessica	6 episodes

=== Video games ===
Year	Title	Role	Notes
2008	Need for Speed: Undercover	Rose Largo	Voice role
2011	Infamous 2	NSA Lucy Kuo	Voice role
2024	Call of Duty: Black Ops 6	Jane Harrow	Voice role, motion and facial capture
