= Sky Sci-Fi =

British and Irish pay television channel

- Logo used since 2026

- Alternate Logo for UI/EPG, digital and small format spaces.
- Country: United Kingdom
- Broadcast area: United Kingdom

Programming
- Picture format: 1080i HDTV
- Timeshift service: Syfy +1 (closed in 2022)

Ownership
- Owner: Sky Group (Comcast)
- Sister channels: List of Sky UK channels

History
- Launched: 1 October 1995; 31 years ago (as Sci Fi Channel/Syfy); 26 July 2022; 4 years ago (as Sky Sci-Fi)
- Former names: Sci Fi Channel (1995–2010); Syfy (2010–2022)

Sky Sci-Fi, formerly the Sci Fi Channel and Syfy UK, is a British pay television channel owned and operated by Sky Group, a division of Comcast.

Launched as The Sci-Fi Channel, it was rebranded as Syfy on 13 April 2010, as part of an ongoing global rebranding. The relaunch was accompanied by the premieres of V and Human Target. The channel was given a new on-air look and a tagline of "Imagine greater".

Sky applied for a Sky Sci-Fi trademark on 4 May 2022. On 14 June 2022 Sky confirmed that the channel rebrand would take place at 11am on 26 July, accompanied by a refreshed schedule of new and existing content.

== History ==
First Syfy logo used from 2010 to 2017

Second Syfy logo used from 2017 to 2022

Sky Sci-Fi logo used from 2022 to 2026

It was launched in 1995 as a localised variant of the US channel Sci Fi Channel (now Syfy), with a similar programming line-up. It was on air each day from 8:00 am until 2:00 am, but only on cable as a lack of transponder space on satellite meant that it was only able to broadcast for few hours each day on that platform. It wasn't until the launch of Sky Digital in 1998 that the channel's full broadcast hours were available on satellite.

Programming in the channel's early years followed the US channel's model, then consisting largely of archive shows such as Lost in Space, The Incredible Hulk, Buck Rogers in the 25th Century, and films from the Paramount and MCA vaults. The channel was also notable for being one of the first UK television channels to show anime movies and television series on a regular basis. These programming choices were supplemented by a few 1980s animated series shown in the mornings such as Robotech, Bionic Six and G-Force, although they were dropped as the channel's lineup became more independent of the original US channel.

Currently, most archive and anime programming have been phased out of the channel, which now concentrates on contemporary show, movies, and other programming. One original UK production was the late-night show Headf**k, which featured excerpts from unusual TV shows, short films (including Chris Barfoot's 'Phoenix' and 'The Reckoning') and music videos from around the world. Later episodes were presented by David Icke.

Programmes on the channel throughout more recent times have included UK premieres of big name US shows like Heroes, Flash Gordon, Eureka, and more recently Knight Rider, Legend of the Seeker and Joss Whedon's Dollhouse. Also shown as of February 2007 are digitally remastered episodes of Star Trek (not to be confused with the remastered series with new CGI); in October the channel secured an exclusive deal with CBS to air Star Trek: The Next Generation episodes, remastered from original film elements to current HD standards with new HD CGI sequences, and as of November 2012 have been broadcasting them in (mostly) chronological order.

== Viewership and reach ==
As of April 2008, the channel reached an average of three million UK and Ireland households a week, appealing equally to male and female demographics.

Initially, the channel shared its analogue satellite transponder with no less than five other channels, limiting its output to early evenings and late nights with the rest of its continuous daytime programming (including cartoons) restricted to cable customers. With the launch of Sky Digital in the UK the channel eventually expanded to exclusive broadcasting on its own channel and now broadcasts round the clock most days each week.

== Most watched programmes ==
The following is a list of the ten most watched shows on Syfy (previously Sci-Fi), based on Live +7 data supplied by BARB up to 10 September 2017. The number of viewers does not include viewers from Ireland, repeats or airings on Syfy +1.

Rank	Show	Episode	No. of viewers	Date
1	Heroes	1.01 – Genesis	579,000	19 February 2007
2	V	2.09 – Devil in a Blue Dress	549,000	19 May 2011
3	Heroes	1.19 – .07%	529,000	18 June 2007
4	Heroes	1.05 – Hiros	523,000	12 March 2007
5	Heroes	1.03 – One Giant Leap	512,000	26 February 2007
6	Heroes	1.06 – Better Halves	509,000	19 March 2007
7	The Librarians	1.01 – And the Crown of King Arthur	503,000	8 December 2014
8	Heroes	1.04 – Collison	502,000	5 March 2007
9	Heroes	1.02 – Don't Look Back	494,000	19 February 2007
10	Knight Rider	1.01 – A Knight in Shining Armor	490,000	19 May 2009

== HD feed ==
A high-definition simulcast channel was launched on the Sky+ HD service as the 31st high-definition channel on Sky. A range of high definition movies, including Sci Fi Channel original production Ba'al: The Storm God, aired on the channel along with Eli Stone, Tin Man and Sanctuary.

It was added to Virgin TV on 1 April 2010.

== See also ==
- List of science fiction television programs
