= Godsend =

Godsend may refer to:

== People ==
- Godsend, codename for Oscar Seborer (1921–2015), atomic spy for the Soviet Union (1941–1951)

== Literature ==
- The Godsend, 1976 novel by Bernard Taylor

== Film ==
- The Godsend (film), a 1980 British horror film adapted from Bernard Taylor's novel
- Godsend (2004 film), a 2004 American/Canadian science fiction horror film
- Godsend (2014 film), a 2014 South Korean drama film
- "Godsend" (Heroes), an episode of the television series Heroes

== Music ==
- Godsend, an album by Nancy Wilson, 1984
- Godsend, an album by Bloodred Hourglass, 2019
- Godsend, an album by Riley Clemmons, 2021
- "Godsend", a song by DC Talk from the album Supernatural, 1998
