= The Godsend (film) =

- Theatrical release poster
- Directed by: Gabrielle Beaumont
- Screenplay by: Olaf Pooley
- Based on: The Godsend by Bernard Taylor
- Produced by: Gabrielle Beaumont
- Starring: Malcolm Stoddard; Cyd Hayman; Angela Pleasence; Patrick Barr; Wilhelmina Green; Joanne Boorman
- Cinematography: Norman Warwick
- Edited by: Michael Ellis
- Music by: Roger Webb
- Production company: The Cannon Group, Inc.
- Distributed by: The Cannon Group, Inc.
- Release date: 11 January 1980 (Los Angeles)
- Running time: 93 minutes
- Country: United Kingdom
- Language: English
- Budget: $1.1 million
- Box office: $1.65 million

The Godsend is a 1980 British horror film directed by Gabrielle Beaumont, written by Olaf Pooley, and starring Malcolm Stoddard, Cyd Hayman, Angela Pleasence, Patrick Barr, Wilhelmina Green, and Joanne Boorman. It follows a family who adopt an infant girl from a strange woman, only to find that, as they raise her, their other children begin to die in a series of mysterious accidents. It is based on the 1976 novel The Godsend by Bernard Taylor. The film was released in the United States on 11 January 1980 by The Cannon Group, Inc.

== Plot ==
Alan and Kate Marlowe are out for a walk with their kids, Davy, Lucy, Sam, and baby Matthew. Kate meets a pregnant stranger, and she comes home with them. It is apparent that Alan finds something "off" about her right away as she intensely stares at him, but he does not say anything. Left briefly unattended, she cuts their telephone line. Alan is about to drive her home, but she goes into labor, and Kate helps her deliver a baby girl. The next day, Kate sees the woman is gone, having abandoned the child with them. Despite Alan's reservations, Kate wants to keep the baby, whom they name Bonnie. Later on, they find Matthew dead in a playpen with Bonnie.

At a family picnic, Davy and Bonnie wander off, and they search for them desperately. Kate finds Bonnie on the bank of a creek with scratches on her hands, while Alan finds that Davy has drowned in the creek. Alan attempts to perform CPR on Davy but is unsuccessful. Later, Kate and Alan agree that the scratches on Bonnie must have been from Davy saving her. Bonnie starts to break things, and Sam gets blamed for them, despite him saying he did not do it. Kate attributes this to Sam's jealousy of Bonnie. One day, the family is playing hide and seek and Alan finds Sam dead in a barn. Later, Alan finds Bonnie's ribbon next to where Sam's body was.

The Marlowes begin to receive letters accusing them of killing their children, and Kate falls into a depression. When a reporter comes to their house and upsets Kate, Alan agrees to move the family to London. Bonnie becomes ill with the mumps and purposely kisses Alan as he takes a nap. He becomes ill with the mumps too and has a flashback in a dream to the circumstances of the deaths of his sons and Bonnie being nearby in each one.

At a playground, Alan watches Bonnie throw an unoccupied swing in the path of a swing Lucy is swinging on. The chains on the swing twist together, but Lucy does not fall off, and Alan is able to save her before she is hurt. Alan tries to discuss his concerns about Bonnie with Kate, saying she is not normal. Kate strongly disagrees, saying that Bonnie loves Lucy and was only playing. Alan says Bonnie loves Lucy the same way she loved their three boys, and Kate is disgusted at the insinuation. Alan tells Kate his theories about Bonnie being involved in the deaths, but she is still in disbelief. Alan uses an analogy about Bonnie, saying that a cuckoo lays its eggs in another nest, and the fledgling pushes the others out to get the full attention of the parents.

Alan wants to send Bonnie away, but Kate refuses, so he kidnaps Lucy. Alan goes to see Kate, who is distraught that Alan will not tell her where Lucy is. Alan gives Kate an ultimatum to choose Bonnie or Lucy. She refuses to do so and he leaves. Later, they find out that Kate has had an accident and is in the hospital. Alan rushes back to London, where he learns that Kate had been pregnant but miscarried due to the accident.

Back at their apartment, Alan finds out from their neighbor, Mr. Taverner, that Kate tripped over a doll at the top of a staircase and that Mrs. Taverner has taken Bonnie on a trip. Kate comes to Alan's work to tell him she wants a divorce. He is alarmed to learn that Bonnie is home alone with Lucy. Alan calls Lucy, telling her to go next door to the Taverners. Bonnie has them locked in, and as Kate and Alan get home, Bonnie has used mind control on Lucy to make her jump out of a window to her death. Alan tries to kill Bonnie, but Mr. Taverner pulls him off of her. Kate decides to stay with Bonnie, and Alan leaves her. At a park, Alan sees the strange woman who gave birth to Bonnie, and is now pregnant and talking to the mother. He runs after them to warn the family, but they are already gone.

== Cast ==
- Malcolm Stoddard as Alan Marlowe
- Cyd Hayman as Kate Marlowe
- Angela Pleasence as The Stranger
- Patrick Barr as Dr. Collins
- Wilhelmina Green as Bonnie
- Joanne Boorman as baby Bonnie
- Angela Deamer as Lucy Marlowe
- Clarissa Young as Younger Lucy
- Lee Gregory as Davy Marlowe
- Piers Eady as Sam Marlowe
- Anna Wing as Mrs. Taverner
- Artro Morris as Mr. Taverner

== Release ==
The Cannon Group, Inc. released The Godsend theatrically in the United States on 11 January 1980, premiering it in Los Angeles. It screened in numerous U.S. cities through the following weeks, as well as in Canada. The film screened in the United Kingdom in June 1981 as a double feature alongside Schizoid (1980).

=== Home media ===
Scream Factory first released the film on Blu-ray in 2015 as part of a double-feature with The Outing; this release went out of print in February 2021. Kino Lorber, through their Kino Cult sublabel, reissued the film on Blu-ray as a standalone release in early 2025.

== Reception ==
=== Box office ===
The Godsend grossed $1,650,000 at the United States and Canadian box offices.

=== Critical response ===
Joe Pollack of the St. Louis Post-Dispatch wrote that, "though not a perfect film, [it] is a pretty good example... The film has moments when it drags, but it has many others that are both fascinating and scary." The Austin American-Statesman's Patrick Taggart panned the film as "nothing but a study in how decent actors—Malcolm Stoddard and Cyd Hayman—are made to throw talent into a bottomless pit of ineptness on all fronts." Bob Curtright of The Wichita Eagle praised the film as "a cut above similar fare. It's low-key and sneaky rather than extravagant and graphic."

George Meyer, a film professor and critic, wrote in The Tampa Tribune that "instead of frightening the viewer with costly gimmicks, Beaumont exploits some basic human fears, most of them involving our protective feelings about children," adding that while the film "makes good use of its limitations, it retains the look and feel of a limited effort." If it weren't for those few squirmy moments, the film's appeal would be even more limited." John Dodd of the Edmonton Journal commended the film's focus on suspense over graphic violence, but felt it would have been better-suited as a television film.

== Sources ==
- Donahue, Suzanne Mary (1987). American Film Distribution: The Changing Marketplace. Ann Arbor, Michigan: UMI Research Press. ISBN 978-0-835-71776-2.
