= Jess Foley =

Jess Foley may refer to:

- Jess Foley (writer)
- Jess Foley (sportswoman)

== See also ==
- Jess Folley, singer
