= Symptoms (film) =

1974 film

- Theatrical poster
- Directed by: José Ramón Larraz (Note: Credited as Joseph Larraz.)
- Screenplay by: José Ramón Larraz; Stanley Miller
- Story by: Thomas Owen
- Produced by: Jean L. Dupuis
- Starring: Angela Pleasence; Lorna Heilbron; Peter Vaughan; Ronald O'Neil
- Cinematography: Trevor Wrenn
- Edited by: Brian Smedley-Aston
- Music by: John Scott
- Production company: Finiton Productions
- Distributed by: Bryanston Pictures (United States)
- Release date: 10 May 1974 (Cannes)
- Running time: 91 minutes
- Country: United Kingdom
- Language: English

Symptoms (also known as Symptômes and The Blood Virgin) is a 1974 British psychological horror film directed by José Ramón Larraz and starring Angela Pleasence, Peter Vaughan, and Lorna Heilbron. It was written by Larraz and Stanley Miller based on a story by Thomas Owen, and follows a woman who, while staying with her friend at a remote English manor, begins to observe obsessive and disturbing behavior from her host.

== Plot ==
The film opens with brief flashes of a man and a woman embracing. The man later proves to be Brady, the "odd-job man." There is also a flash of the woman's body floating in the lake.

The reclusive Helen invites her friend Anne, a writer, to stay the weekend with her at her family's estate. The large manor, located near a lake in a forest, is overgrown with foliage and has mostly been untouched for an extended period of time. Helen, a translator, has recently returned to her native England after working abroad, and had lost touch with Anne. Helen had broken up with her boyfriend John. The two women have dinner, start a fire in the hearth, during a storm, and talk over tea before going to bed. Helen asks Anne what she thinks happens after death.

The next morning, Helen stops by a chemist store in town, where the clerk, Mr. Burke, asks about her friend, Cora Porter; she tells him she is not with her. Back at the manor, Helen and Anne go for a walk through the woods. At the lake, Helen tells Anne that someone drowned themselves there. The two women take a boat out onto the water, which unnerves Helen. En route home, they encounter Brady, a handyman who lives in the stables on the property; Anne comments that he was staring at Helen, and Helen responds by saying he disgusts her. Later, Helen spies on him with binoculars from the house.

Helen continues to have trouble sleeping at the house, and hears voices emanating from the attic one night. The following morning, Anne borrows Helen's car to drive to town. On the way home, she stops by the lake and smokes a cigarette, where she is confronted by Brady, who introduces himself. He mentions Helen's friend Cora, whose photograph Anne recalls seeing in the house. Anne returns to the house where she finds Helen distraught over her absence. She confides in Anne that she is ill, and Anne suggests they return to London, but Helen refuses, and then kisses her.

That night, Anne is awoken by moaning noises. She asks Helen if someone else could be living in the house, but Helen dismisses the idea. John arrives at the house to pick up Anne, but Anne insists on staying a few days longer due to Helen's fragile emotional state. Helen observes John kissing Anne in the car, and is upset. That night, Helen's attention is drawn to an attic door in her bedroom, and she begins to masturbate furiously. Anne gets up to investigate the noises she hears and is startled by a figure who stabs her to death.

Hannah, the housekeeper, arrives in the morning, and finds Helen asleep on the couch; Helen asks her not to return for several days, saying she needs solitude. Later at the chemist's, Hannah tells Mr. Burke about the interaction and recalls that she once saw Cora having sex with Brady in the stables, and has not seen her since. While walking through the woods, Helen is confronted by Brady, who asks her about Anne's whereabouts; when he intimates that she murdered Anne and Cora, Helen runs away in a panic.

At the house, Anne's body sits in a chair in Helen's bedroom and Helen is plagued by disembodied voices and other phenomena. During a rainstorm, John arrives looking for Anne and enters though an unlocked door. Upstairs, Helen stabs him in the head and neck numerous times, killing him. That night Brady stops by Helen's house to confront her about Cora, whose decomposing body he has found in the lake. He has cut off some off Cora's hair and brought it with him to show Helen. He tells Helen that he witnessed her push Cora into the lake but she coolly denies it. When he threatens to blackmail her, she stabs him repeatedly in the face and the back of the head, killing him. She then appears to see Cora standing in an open doorway, illuminated by flashes of lightning during another rainstorm. The next morning Hannah, Burke and his apprentice Nick arrive at the house. In the living room, they find Brady's corpse. While searching upstairs, they find John's body in the hallway and Helen staring blankly through the window. She watches as Brady and Cora embrace in the courtyard.

== Cast ==
- Angela Pleasence as Helen Ramsey
- Peter Vaughan as Brady
- Lorna Heilbron as Anne Weston
- Nancy Nevinson as Hannah
- Ronald O'Neil as John
- Marie-Paule Mailleux as Cora Porter
- Mike Grady as Nick (credited as Michael Grady)
- Raymond Huntley as Burke

== Production ==
=== Financing ===
According to editor Brian Smedley-Aston, Larraz financed the picture himself from his income as a comic book artist and photographer. According to the BFI, funding had come from Jean Dupuis, Belgian heir to the fortune generated by the success of The Smurfs, who had decided to go into film production and set up a company in the UK. Symptoms marked the beginning of a working relationship between Larraz and Smedley-Aston; Smedley-Aston would also later work with several American directors, including Jeff Lieberman on Squirm (1976) and Blue Sunshine (1978).

=== Casting ===
Jean Seberg was cast in the role of Helen Ramsey, but was forced to drop out of the production last-minute due to the fact that she was not a member of the Actors' Equity Association; Angela Pleasence was then cast in the leading role.

=== Filming ===
The film was shot in Harefield Grove, a grade-II listed, early-nineteenth-century country house in the London borough of Hillingdon, where Larraz would later film Vampyres.

Pleasence described the film shoot as consisting of long days which required her to "get up at four in the morning, and not be home before eleven at night," and noted that director Larraz was controlling on set. Pleasence had known co-star Peter Vaughan since her childhood as he was a friend of her father, actor Donald Pleasence. During filming, she was struck by an overhead light and was hospitalized.

Actress Lorna Heilbron recalled the Larraz as being "intense" and approaching the script in a "psychological way." She stated that she was not provided the entire script until well after she had been cast in the part of Anne. Both Heilbron and Pleasence stated in 2016 interviews that they had remained close personal friends since making the film.

== Release ==
Symptoms premiered at the 1974 Cannes Film Festival as the first official British entry in May 1974. A truncated version of the film, running 81 minutes, was released in the United States by Bryanston Pictures in 1976.

=== Obscurity and rediscovery ===
The original prints of Symptoms were missing for many years; the film was last shown on British television in 1989, although it circulated privately through bootlegs. In February 2016, it was announced that with the help of the British Film Institute, the prints had been obtained and the film would be released on DVD.

=== Home media ===
In 2016, the film was released in the United States on DVD and Blu-ray for the first time by Mondo Macabro home video. The same year, it received a DVD and Blu-ray release in the United Kingdom by the British Film Institute.

== Reception ==
Film scholars have noted parallels between Symptoms and Roman Polanski's Repulsion (1965).

The Monthly Film Bulletin wrote: "From the moment that its spectral heroine (beautifully played by Angela Pleasence) begins to show signs of serious mental disturbance, Symptoms quite clearly moves on to Repulsion territory. But if the denouement holds few surprises, the film builds towards it in comparatively original and disturbing ways. ... Symptoms works more on the level of atmosphere than of ideas, but its psychological perceptions are unusually sophisticated for genre cinema."

Time Out wrote that it was: "the finest British horror movie from a foreigner since Polanski's Repulsion. The comparison is inevitable, because thematically the films have a good deal in common, charting the gradual mental dissolution of their spectral heroines. Symptoms imitates, but also improves on its original in a multiplicity of ways. The muted love affair between Pleasence and Lorna Heilbron is etched with enormous suggestiveness, and Larraz’s eye for visual detail is mesmerizing."

Variety wrote: "Pic is a fair-to-middlin' low budget horror chiller with enough suspense ingredients to entertain undemanding blood-and-gore buffs in appropriate slottings. ... And until things get slightly out of hand, Larraz manages some taut and intriguing footage, while throughout pic is strikingly lensed by Trevor Wrenn's color camera."

TV Guide concluded, "a truly chilling atmosphere is created, but its effectiveness is lost when the gore takes over."

The BFI wrote, "it’s a slow burner but John Scott’s excellent score and Larraz’s sparse but effective use of shock tactics (a face at a window; a briefly glimpsed figure at the edge of the frame that really shouldn’t be there) ensure a mounting sense of dread. Pleasence steals the show but is capably assisted by Lorna Heilbron as the new object of her twisted affection and Peter Vaughan."

== Sources ==
- Cooper, Ian (2016). Frightmares: A History of British Horror Cinema. New York City, New York: Columbia University Press. ISBN 978-0-993-07174-4.
- Pirie, David (2008). A New Heritage of Horror: The English Gothic Cinema, Revised and Updated Edition. London, England: I.B. Tauris. ISBN 978-1-845-11481-7.
- Smith, Gary A. (2006). Uneasy Dreams: The Golden Age of British Horror Films, 1956–1976. Jefferson, North Carolina: McFarland. ISBN 978-1-476-60530-2.
- Shail, Robert (2008). Seventies British Cinema. New York City, New York: Palgrave Macmillan. ISBN 978-1-844-57273-1.
- Smith, L.S. (2002). Chibnall, Steve; Petley, Julian (eds.). British Horror Cinema. London, England: Routledge. ISBN 978-0-415-23003-2.
