= The Voyage of Charles Darwin =

- Genre: Drama
- Written by: Robert Reid
- Directed by: Martyn Friend
- Starring: Malcolm Stoddard; Andrew Burt
- Theme music composer: Wilfred Josephs
- Country of origin: United Kingdom
- Original language: English
- No. of series: 1
- No. of episodes: 7

Production
- Running time: 350 minutes
- Production companies: BBC, Time-Life Television

Original release
- Network: BBC2
- Release: 31 October – 12 December 1978

The Voyage of Charles Darwin is a 1978 BBC television serial depicting the life of Charles Darwin, focusing largely on his voyage on HMS Beagle. The series encompasses his university days to the 1859 publication of his book On the Origin of Species and his death and is loosely based on Darwin's own letters, diaries, and journals, especially The Voyage of the Beagle and The Autobiography of Charles Darwin. It starred Malcolm Stoddard as Darwin and Andrew Burt as Captain Robert FitzRoy.

The barque Marques was refitted to depict HMS Beagle.

The series was repeated in December 1995. It was broadcast in the US on PBS starting 27 January 1980 and was hosted by Neil Armstrong. It was produced by Christopher Ralling.

The series was accompanied by the publication of a collated volume of Darwin's writings on the voyage organised chronologically, edited by Ralling and published under the eponymous title The Voyage of Charles Darwin.

== Cast ==
- Malcolm Stoddard – Charles Darwin
- Andrew Burt – Robert FitzRoy
- Peter Settelen – Lieutenant Sullivan
- David Ashton – Lieutenant Wickham
- Jenny Quayle – Catherine Darwin

== Episodes ==
| No. | Title | Original release date | Length |
|---|---|---|---|
| 1 | "I Was Considered a Very Ordinary Boy" | 31 October 1978 | 60min. |
Darwin is uncertain of his career. While at college, he becomes increasingly interested in the natural world. Under the influence of Professor Henslow, he signs on to a 3-year expedition aboard HMS Beagle.
| 2 | "My Mind Was a Chaos of Delight" | 7 November 1978 | 60min. |
After taking part in an initiation rite on his first crossing of the Equator, Darwin reaches South America. There he finds the wonders of the Brazilian rainforest. During a stay in Rio de Janeiro he is confronted by the horrors of slavery.
| 3 | "How Wide Was the Distance Between Savage and Civilised Man" | 14 November 1978 | 60min. |
The Beagle lands on Tierra del Fuego the southernmost tip of South America. The attempt to place a missionary among the indigenous people there fails.
| 4 | "Can Any Mountains, Any Continent, Withstand Such Waste?" | 21 November 1978 | 60min. |
With the length of the expedition increased, Darwin makes an excursion across Patagonia to Buenos Aires. Later, arriving in Valparaíso, he travels across the Andes.
| 5 | "I Felt Myself Brought Within Reach of That Great Fact – That Mystery of Mysteries" | 28 November 1978 | 60min. |
After finding fossilized sea shells high in the Andes, Darwin returns to the Beagle to find FitzRoy suffering from depression. While in Valparaíso, Darwin experiences earthquakes and their devastating effects. After FitzRoy's recovery, the Beagle travels to the Galápagos Islands where Darwin finds startling revelations.
| 6 | "Suppose That All Animals and All Plants Are Represented by the Branches of a Tree – The Tree of Life" | 5 December 1978 | 60min. |
Darwin studies the finches in the Galápagos that would influence his theories for years to come. The Beagle returns to England after five years at sea. He begins to develop his thoughts based on his discoveries during his travels.
| 7 | "In the Distant Future, Light Will Be Thrown Upon the Origin of Man, and His History" | 12 December 1978 | 60min. |
Darwin becomes worried about loss of reputation and public censure of his ideas and delays publishing his work.

== Reception ==
The Christian Science Monitor called the series "a profoundly stimulating mix of entertainment and information".

== Awards ==
The series won the 1979 BAFTA Award for Best Factual Series and for Best Cinematography. It was nominated for one other BAFTA. It also won Best Documentary Series from the Broadcasting Press Guild Awards in 1979.
