= Peter Settelen =

British actor and voice coach (born 1951)

- Born: 23 September 1951 (age 74); London, United Kingdom
- Occupations: Actor, voice coach
- Known for: Helping Diana, Princess of Wales improve her public speaking skills

Peter Settelen (born 23 September 1951) is a British actor and voice coach, known for helping Diana, Princess of Wales (1961–1997) improve her public speaking skills.

== Early life ==
Settelen was born in London. He worked as an actor, including a role in three episodes of the soap opera Coronation Street, and in an episode of Thriller (1975), before becoming a voice coach.

== Princess Diana (1961–1997) ==
He was commissioned between 1992 and 1993 to help Princess Diana develop her public speaking voice, having been introduced to her by her personal fitness instructor, Carolan Brown. Settelen videotaped Diana talking about her private life. Following her death in 1997, the tapes were seized by the Metropolitan Police in a 2001 raid on the home of Diana's butler, Paul Burrell. Ownership of the tapes was contested by her brother, Lord Charles Spencer, but they were returned to Settelen in 2004. Extracts from the tapes were screened by American broadcaster NBC later the same year, in a programme called Diana Revealed. In August 2017, extracts from the tapes were screened by Channel 4 television.

== Filmography ==
Year	Title	Role	Notes
1975	Public Eye	Giles Robinson	
1977	A Bridge Too Far	Lieutenant Cole	
1978	The One and Only Phyllis Dixey	Father McGuire	TV movie
1978	The Voyage of Charles Darwin	Lieutenant Sullivan	TV series. 6 episodes
1980	Pride and Prejudice	George Wickham	
1989	Triangle at Rhodes	Douglas Gold	Poirot, Season 1, episode 6 (1989)

== Bibliography ==
- Just Talk To Me... from Private Voice to Public Speaker. HarperCollins. 1995. ISBN 9780722530054.
