= Manhunt (1969 TV series) =

- Genre: Drama
- Created by: Rex Firkin
- Starring: Alfred Lynch; Peter Barkworth; Cyd Hayman
- Theme music composer: Ludwig van Beethoven
- Opening theme: Symphony No. 5 (Beethoven)
- Ending theme: Symphony No. 5 (Beethoven)
- Country of origin: United Kingdom
- Original language: English
- No. of series: 1
- No. of episodes: 26

Production
- Executive producer: Rex Firkin
- Producer: Andrew Brown
- Running time: 26 x 50 minute episodes
- Production company: London Weekend Television

Original release
- Network: ITV
- Release: 2 January – 26 June 1970

Manhunt is a Second World War drama series consisting of 26 episodes, produced by London Weekend Television in 1969 and broadcast nationwide in the United Kingdom from January 1970.

== Synopsis ==
British pilot Jimmy Briggs (Alfred Lynch) has crashed his aeroplane in occupied France and immediately finds himself on the run from the Nazis. He comes across a resistance cell whose leader is code-named Vincent (Peter Barkworth). Nina (Cyd Hayman), a part-Jewish agent with important information of resistance figures and addresses, also appears in the town, upset and terrified after her own Paris cell is destroyed by the Nazis. Vincent is ordered to get her back to Britain or to kill her if he has to. The three are pursued across France by SS Obersturmbannführer Lutzig (Philip Madoc) and Abwehr Sgt. Gratz (Robert Hardy), a complex psychological character who, it is implied, falls in love with Nina. Unlike many previous war dramas, the story presents the key Nazis with some nuance. Though Lutzig is a cold and relentless SS officer he can be intelligent and creative in his job; Gratz is a deeply flawed and contradictory character who fully understands his personal shortcomings. Manhunt also portrayed in detail the rivalry between the SS and the Abwehr.

Although the overall plot is driven by the need to keep Nina out of the hands of the Germans and return her to England with her secret information, the series ended in an anti-climax. Gratz is sure that he has all of Nina's information anyway, mostly through pillow talk and carelessness on her part. Nina and Jimmy, despite their closeness while on the run, live in different worlds in England. Their relationship does not endure.

The series takes place from September 1942 to the first half of 1943. By the time the River Cher is crossed (Episode 5), the Free Zone in the south of France is already occupied by the Germans (from November 10, 1942).

== Cast ==
- Alfred Lynch as Jimmy Briggs
- Peter Barkworth as Vincent
- Cyd Hayman as Nina
- Maggie Fitzgibbon as Adelaide
- Robert Hardy as Abwehr Sgt Gratz
- Philip Madoc as Lutzig

In addition, Manhunt has many notable guest appearances, such as by Paul Darrow, John Savident, George Sewell, Julian Glover, Nerys Hughes, Tony Beckley, Yootha Joyce, Stephen Lewis, William Marlowe, Brian Cox and Richard Hurndall.

== Notes ==
- The Allied agents identify themselves to each other at one point with the challenge "What is war?" to which the answer is "War is love".
- The musical theme was taken from Beethoven's Fifth Symphony, which features the famous rhythm used to introduce radio broadcasts to Nazi occupied territories, and also signifies the letter "V", for Victory, in Morse Code.
- With the exception of the episode "One More River", and outdoor scenes in various episodes such as "Better Doubt than Die" and "The Enemy You Know" which were shot on film, the programme was mostly shot on colour videotape.
- After a brief pre-credit sequence (the only one in the series), the episode "Intent To Steal" features no spoken dialogue.
- In the episode "Degrade and Rule", the studio atmosphere is briefly noticeable at minute 29. A microphone sneaks into the upper left corner of the frame.
- In the episodes "Betrayal" and "The Price of Resistance", the SS insignia on SS Obersturmbannführer Lutzig's collar has been sewn on upside down. It is the correct way up in other episodes.

== Episode list ==
No.	Title	Directed by	Written by	Original release date
1	"Fare Forward Voyagers"	Bill Bain	Bruce Stewart	2 January 1970
September 1942: After Nazis break up a meeting of French resistance leaders, murdering her comrades, "Nina" flees Paris. She meets with the British agent "Vincent", along with RAF pilot Jimmy, whose plane has crashed nearby. Vincent is ordered to escort Nina, who has the names of key resistance figures in her head, to safety, or kill her.
2	"Break-Up"	Rex Firkin	Derek Ingrey	9 January 1970
After witnessing the rape of a farm girl by a Vichy policeman, Nina is shocked by the scant sympathy shown by the others and breaks away on her own - with dire results.
3	"Only The Dead Survive"	Cyril Coke	Roy Clarke	16 January 1970
With the Gestapo closing in on them, Vincent takes Nina and Jimmy to his family château where they are hidden by a loyal gamekeeper.
4	"What Did You Do In The War, Daddy?"	Bill Bain	Arden Winch	23 January 1970
Jimmy, Vincent and Nina hide in a disused room at the top of Vincent’s family château, but the refuge becomes a prison when the Gestapo occupy the lower rooms.
5	"One More River"	Cyril Coke	Bruce Stewart	30 January 1970
Vincent, Jimmy and Nina have 50 miles of occupied France to traverse before they reach the River Cher, where Free France begins.
6	"Open House"	Bill Bain	Jonathan Hales	6 February 1970
Vincent, Jimmy and Nina seek refuge in a "safe" house. Vincent's controlling behaviour provokes a fight with Jimmy. But who are the mysterious figures outside in the shadows?
7	"Better Doubt Than Die"	Cyril Coke	Harry Green	13 February 1970
As the German military roars south to Toulon, Vincent, Jimmy and Nina hide in an old toll-house. Vincent risks their lives by trying to contact the local Resistance.
8	"A Different Kind of War"	Rex Firkin	Jonathan Hales	20 February 1970
Christmas 1942: Jimmy and Nina shelter at a farmhouse. At once, they realise that they have walked into a bizarre and sinister situation.
9	"Betrayal"	Cyril Coke	Elwyn Jones	27 February 1970
Sergeant Gratz, a skilled Abwehr interrogator, takes charge of the hunt with orders that undermine SS Obersturmbannführer Lutzig. Gratz closes in on Vincent, Jimmy and Nina as they hide in an armaments factory. One of the workers is an informer, but which one?
10	"With a Sort of Love"	Bill Bain	Vincent Tilsley	6 March 1970
Gratz interrogates Nina; his methods are offbeat but persuasive. Lutzig also wants her information, provoking conflict between the SS and the Abwehr. As the interrogation goes on, it is Gratz who begins to crack. Vincent attempts a rescue, but Nina is unwilling to leave.
11	"The Price of Resistance"	Cyril Coke	Hugo Charteris	13 March 1970
January 1943: To the annoyance of Lutzig, Nina has been released by Gratz. The three are hidden in the small town of Boiziers by Doctor Moussac and his wife. Lutzig takes three local worthies as hostages, one of whom is Madame Moussac's brother, and orders a battalion of captured Russian Tartars to search the town.
12	"The Enemy You Know"	Bill Bain	Jonathan Hales	20 March 1970
Vincent, Jimmy and Nina flee westward and seek help from a local resistance leader, who tells them escape to the south is now impossible. In an attempt to protect them by putting them in full view, he puts all three to work in his sleazy nightclub, a favourite haunt of Nazis. But Lutzig has an informer at the club. Gratz puts himself in danger when he meets Nina again.
13	"A Way to Die"	Cyril Coke	Andrew Brown	27 March 1970
Jimmy and Vincent learn of an impending SS raid on a junk shop where a major Resistance meeting is planned. They visit the building to warn the Resistance, but the group has already been tipped off and the Nazis close in with Jimmy and Vincent trapped inside. They decide only one of them can escape, and Vincent tosses a coin.
14	"One Way Home"	Bill Bain	Jonathan Hales	3 April 1970
Narrowly escaping the SS round-up in which Vincent was shot and caught, Jimmy has been found by Francine, the club waitress who has fallen for him. Also in the house is Francine's weary mother, and her brainwashed younger brother, a potential informer. Vincent makes contact with Allard, the local Resistance head, who arranges a plan for Jimmy's escape to Sweden. But Jimmy is determined to find Nina.
15	"Little Man, Big Gun Pt 1"	Robert Tronson	Vincent Tilsley	10 April 1970
Gratz captures a young British agent, David Mainwaring, codename Cadet, and exploits Nina's attraction for the agent in order to extract information from him. But the agent is wary of Gratz's offer.
16	"Little Man, Big Gun pt 2"	James Ormerod	Vincent Tilsley	17 April 1970
Nina and David are hiding in Gratz's apartment. Playing a series of mind games, Gratz proves that David’s affection for Nina is weaker than his sense of duty.
17	"The Ugly Side of War"	Cyril Coke	William Martin	24 April 1970
Jimmy, hiding in the Bordeaux bar where Adelaide works, is picked up by the new local Gestapo security officer Hochler. Because he has no papers, Jimmy is sent to work at the Nazi-controlled metalworks where a new secret alloy is being tested for the Luftwaffe. In order to get out of the factory to the Resistance, Jimmy pretends to act as informant for Hochler.
18	"Confessional"	Bill Bain	Hugo Charteris	1 May 1970
After Gratz leaves the flat, Nina is contacted and given a message to meet Adelaide and Jimmy in the church of St Xavier. But is it a Gestapo ruse to get Nina away from Gratz?
19	"The Death-Wish"	Robert Tronson	Arden Winch	8 May 1970
In Paris, after intense but fruitless physical and mental torture by Lutzig and the SS, Vincent is offered his freedom. How can he be sure it is not a trap?
20	"Machine"	James Ormerod	Peter J Hammond	15 May 1970
A Gestapo agent in the metalworks terrorises Jimmy into revealing his identity and an innocent Polish worker is executed.
21	"Degrade and Rule"	Cyril Coke	Harry Green	22 May 1970
Gratz tries to trick British Intelligence by the use of a captured transmitter and a British agent. His plan backfires and he is arrested.
22	"Intent to Steal"	Robert Tronson	Jonathan Hales	29 May 1970
Spring 1943: Vincent, Jimmy and Adelaide, with a strong force of the Bordeaux Resistance organisation, infiltrate the German-controlled metalworks in a last desperate attempt to seize an aircraft component.
23	"The Train May Be Late"	James Ormerod	Alfred Shaughnessy	5 June 1970
Vincent, Nina and Adelaide embark on a highly dangerous train journey.
24	"Little Man, What Next? Pt 1"	Bill Bain	Vincent Tilsley	12 June 1970
Lutzig arrests Gratz, who is tortured in an effort to force him to betray Nina. He resists and survives, but is finally confronted by someone he is shocked to see.
25	"Little Man, What Next? Pt 2"	Robert Tronson	Vincent Tilsley	19 June 1970
As the price of his freedom, Gratz makes a promise to Lutzig: he will lead the SS to Nina.
26	"The Losers"	James Goddard	William Martin	26 June 1970
Encouraged by Gratz and aided by the Resistance, Nina, JImmy and Adelaide hope to escape to England. Can they really make it to freedom?

== See also ==
- Colditz, a 1972 television drama set during the Second World War, which also portrayed German characters in a more sympathetic way.
