= Nothing to Hide (Heroes) =

- Heroes episode
- Episode no.: Season 1 Episode 7
- Directed by: Donna Deitch
- Written by: Jesse Alexander
- Cinematography by: John Aronson
- Editing by: Michael S. Murphy
- Original release date: November 6, 2006
- Running time: 43 minutes

Guest appearances
- Clea DuVall as Audrey Hanson; Ashley Crow as Sandra Bennet; Thomas Dekker as Zach; Matthew John Armstrong as Ted Sprague; Cristine Rose as Angela Petrelli; Lisa Lackey as Janice Parkman; James Kyson as Ando Masahashi; Randall Bentley as Lyle Bennet; Jack Coleman as Noah Bennet

Episode chronology
← Previous "Better Halves"	Next → "Seven Minutes to Midnight"
- Heroes season 1

"Nothing to Hide" is the seventh episode of the first season of the American superhero drama television series Heroes. The episode was written by co-executive producer Jesse Alexander, and directed by Donna Deitch. It originally aired on NBC on November 6, 2006.

The series tells the stories of ordinary people who discover that they have superhuman abilities and how these abilities take effect in the characters' lives as they work together to prevent catastrophic futures. In the episode, Matt helps the FBI in finding Sylar, while Micah accompanies D.L. on a road trip.

According to Nielsen Media Research, the episode was seen by an estimated 14.47 million household viewers and gained a 5.1 ratings share among adults aged 18–49. The episode received mixed reviews from critics, who criticized its pacing and lack of character development.

== Plot ==
=== Peter ===
Peter is reading the morning's stock report to Charles Deveaux. After talking about the report, Peter and Charles say "I love you" to each other, implying a close, father and son-like relationship. A doorbell wakes Peter up, revealing the previous scene to be a dream. He opens the door to find a crying Simone Deveaux outside. She informs him that her father died about an hour ago.

Peter and Simone go to see Isaac at his apartment, only to find it deserted and Isaac gone. Simone mentions that her father talked about flying all over the world with Peter and that he saw terrible things, though Peter made him feel better by assuring him that everything would be okay, telling him there were still people who cared, and that they were going to save the world. Peter replies that he hasn't had this conversation with her father. Simone informs Peter that the painting he and Isaac were looking for was sold to "Linderman".

=== Nathan ===
Nathan and his wife, Heidi, strategize on how to win the congressional election. Nathan's mother has scheduled an interview with a big-name newspaper for brunch, which the family usually never has. Nathan and Heidi discuss her becoming a public figure, as she has been out of the spotlight during his campaign, and she states she is looking forward to it. Heidi, we discover, uses a wheelchair as a result of an accident for which Nathan is responsible.

Oliver Dennison notes that Heidi is adjusting well to the wheelchair. She says that while she was angry for a long time, it was at God - not Nathan, as Mr Dennison suggests - towards whom her anger was directed. Peter arrives for brunch and comments on the fact that they never have family brunch. Nathan takes him aside and responds that Peter isn't "family enough" for brunch, as his presence could ruin the election for him.

Peter asks Nathan to help him recover the painting Linderman bought from Simone, but Nathan refuses. Peter then threatens to reveal Nathan's flying ability to Mr. Dennison, leaving Nathan with no choice.

At the brunch, Mr. Dennison informs Nathan that a former member of his security detail reported that there was a scare in Las Vegas about his disappearance, and adds that a blonde woman was involved. Peter quickly covers up for his brother and claims that Nathan spoke to a woman doctor about a private clinic outside of Las Vegas for his mental health.

Later that evening, Niki calls Nathan, asking him for help, as she's trying to find her son. Nathan quickly hangs up when Heidi approaches. She asks him if he still loves her, and he assures her he still does. She tells him that she will walk again, but she will need Nathan's support to do so; she asks him if the story that Peter told is true, and he hastily assures her it is. Nathan is then seen talking on the phone to Mr Linderman about the painting, successfully arranging for it to be delivered to a gallery.

Nathan tells Peter to forget about the paintings, and that they are not going to help. He also informs Peter of the kidnapping attempt in Las Vegas, and of his flight away from the kidnappers. He describes one of the men as wearing horn-rimmed glasses and the other as a "spooky Euro dude" who didn't say a word. Nathan tells his brother that if people knew what they can do, they would lock them up and throw away the key.

=== Niki ===
Niki wakes up on the floor with a large intake of breath. She searches the house and discovers that Micah and D.L. are gone. Niki tells her friend Tina about Jessica, the "other person" that Niki sees in the mirror. Her friend has trouble believing this.

Later, Niki, believing that if she releases Jessica from the mirror it would help her get back her son, breaks the mirror in her room, in hopes of her taking control. When Tina inquires, alter ego Jessica is in control and responds that she has everything under control. She tells her friend to leave, scaring Tina who believes that Niki has turned into a completely different person, an assumption which is confirmed by the appearance of the RNA symbol tattoo on Niki's shoulder, showing that Jessica is in control.

After leaving Las Vegas, Micah asks his father why he left Niki at the home. They then pull up to a burning car, and find the driver outside the car and an unconscious passenger inside. D.L. runs up to the car and tries to pull the passenger out. D.L. then puts his hand inside the car window, and can see his hand through the glass. Hiro and Ando are also present. As soon as the car explodes, Hiro stops time and saves D.L. and the passenger. A few minutes later, D.L. and Micah leave because Ando called the police for help, despite D.L.'s plan to drive them to a hospital.

While at a hotel, Micah goes to a pay-phone signaled as "out of order". When he places his hand on the phone, whirring noises are heard, and the phone starts working again. Micah calls his mother, but finds out that Niki's alter-ego Jessica is on the phone. Jessica asks him where they are. Micah replies, "Please put my mom on the phone." Jessica tells him that his mom is gone and won't be back until they have Micah back. Micah tells Jessica the location of the motel where they are staying. Suddenly, D.L. interrupts, taking the phone from his son and hearing nothing but static. He asks Micah if he was talking to his mom, but Micah answers that he was "just goofing around." D.L. is suspicious, but accepts the answer, since the phone is supposedly out of order. D.L. tells Micah that they have some driving to do.

=== Matt ===
Matt talks to his wife about the last couple of days that they had together. He wants to talk about their issues, but overhears her thinking that "he knows" something that she hasn't shared. Suspecting something, he leaves quickly for work, not allowing himself to find out what was in her mind.

At the police station, a commotion erupts as Audrey enters the men's locker room to tell Matt that he should put on some "real people" clothes.

At his protest, she tells him that the station commander has already been informed, and gives him an FBI ID badge. They go in search of the man who killed Dr. Robert Fresco, an oncologist. The killer, initially suspected to be Sylar, is actually Theodore Sprague, a man with the power to emit radiation.

He is found at the hospital with his wife, Karen, who is dying of cancer. When he realizes Matt and Audrey are police, he uses a nurse as a hostage and shield. Audrey threatens him with her gun, but he tells her he may go "nuclear" if she shoots him. He wants to be with his wife; the doctor's death was an accident, he says: Theodore was trying to persuade the doctor to do more for his wife.

Matt can hear Karen's thoughts, even though she is in a coma, and he allows Theodore a final conversation with her. This calms the man down, and he releases the nurse, who has burns on her arm where Theodore was holding her. Theodore then allows himself to be taken into custody.

Later, in the police locker room, Tom McHenry, Matt's former partner, comments on Audrey's presence, and how Matt will be allowed to take an oral interview for the detective exam. Matt says he didn't know that was an option, and Tom replies that Audrey must have pulled some strings. Matt then overhears Tom's thoughts about sleeping with Matt's wife, and he promptly punches the man in the face before leaving, furious.

=== Claire ===
Zach visits Claire and gives her the tape. Though relieved, Claire is irritated to realize Zach had simply misplaced the tape when he tells her he found it under his bed. Claire hides the tape under a jacket while talking to her mother, and her younger brother Lyle, seeing the corner of the cassette, takes it out and watches it. Claire returns and panics when she sees Lyle watching the tape on the computer. She stops the tape and tries to attribute the video to special effects, but Lyle, disbelieving, staples her hand and becomes horrified when he sees the wound automatically heal after Claire pulls out the staple.

Lyle takes the tape and leads Claire and Zach, who arrives on bicycle, on a chase around the yard before he locks himself in an SUV on the driveway. Claire and Zach try vainly to force him to come out, but Lyle refuses, stating that Claire is a freak. Claire finally convinces Lyle to surrender the tape and come out by explaining that the knowledge of her powers would simply alienate the whole family.

== Production ==
=== Development ===
In October 2006, NBC announced that the seventh episode of the season would be titled "Nothing to Hide". The episode was written by co-executive producer Jesse Alexander, and directed by Donna Deitch. This was Alexander's first writing credit, and Deitch's first directing credit.

== Reception ==
=== Viewers ===
In its original American broadcast, "Nothing to Hide" was seen by an estimated 14.47 million household viewers with a 5.1 in the 18–49 demographics. This means that 5.1 percent of all households with televisions watched the episode. It finished 22nd out of 97 programs airing from November 6–12, 2007. This was a 3% decrease in viewership from the previous episode, which was watched by an estimated 14.89 million household viewers with a 5.3 in the 18–49 demographics.

=== Critical reviews ===
"Nothing to Hide" received mixed reviews from critics. Robert Canning of IGN gave the episode a "good" 7 out of 10 and wrote, "Though much of what happened this week was interesting and cool, it was an overload of plot. We were given very little time to connect to the situations or the characters, except for what's presented on the surface."

Alan Sepinwall wrote, "after weeks and weeks of edge of the seat stuff, I was reclining for most of this. Hopefully, just a blip and not a sign that Tim Kring is turning into a pumpkin (or just back into Tim Kring)." Angel Cohn of TV Guide wrote, "My big complaint? Not enough Hiro! Yeah, he saved D.L. from that exploding car, but I really wanted more of him tonight. He just brings some lightness to this otherwise heavy show. Other than that, I thought it was a good episode, and even though I always end up with a ton of questions, at least some of my queries get answered each week."

Michael Canfield of TV Squad wrote, "The final scene was a great subtle reveal. Not exactly a big surprise ending in the same way that Future Hiro dropped in on Peter a couple of weeks ago, because we suspected something would be up with Micah. It seems evident however, that he knows his power well. Even though he's by far the youngest, he seems to control it, and hide it, better than the others have done. My question is whether he manifested the power recently like the others have, or if he has had it longer, maybe even since birth." Television Without Pity gave the episode a "B–" grade.

Tawny Cypress submitted this episode for consideration for Outstanding Supporting Actress in a Drama Series at the 59th Primetime Emmy Awards.
