= Bernard Taylor (author) =

British author (1934–2025)

Bernard Irwin Taylor (2 October 1934 – December 2025) was a British author of horror, suspense and romantic fiction and of true-crime non-fiction. He wrote several plays for the theatre, and also wrote for television and radio. Taylor later penned novels under the pseudonym Jess Foley.

== Background ==
Bernard Irwin Taylor was born in Swindon, Wiltshire on 2 October 1934. He studied art at Swindon School of Art before moving to London to study at the Chelsea School of Art, where he was awarded the National Diploma in Design and the Chelsea Diploma. This was followed by a year Birmingham University where he underwent teacher-training. Following this he worked for several years as an illustrator and teacher before moving to the United States where he taught art and English and then went into the theatre, first as a designer, then as an actor. As an actor, he worked on Broadway and in various theatres across the country, later taking up writing as well, including several children's plays which were successfully produced.

Following his return to England, he continued with his acting career, appearing in numerous stage, film and television productions and numerous television commercials, but concentrating on his writing. His first play, Daughter of the Apaches (which he directed and appeared in), was produced in 1975 at the Queen's Theatre Hornchurch. It won Taylor Thames Television's Most Promising New Playwright award, and he was also seconded as Resident Playwright to the theatre for a year. During this time the theatre produced his second play, Mice on the First Floor, starring Frances Tomelty, and produced several children's plays which he wrote in partnership with Ginnie Hole.

Also in 1975, he wrote his first novel, The Godsend. Between 1976 and 2020 he published eleven novels, numerous short stories and four non-fiction works under his own name, and five novels under the pseudonym Jess Foley. Taylor's four non-fiction works were all shortlisted for the Crime Writers' Association's Gold Dagger for Non-Fiction Award. Perfect Murder, written with the late Stephen Knight, won the award in 1987.

Taylor later lived in Blackheath, southeast London. He died in December 2025, aged 91.

== Adaptations ==
A film version of The Godsend was released in 1980. It was produced and directed by Gabrielle Beaumont, the screenplay written by her husband Olaf Pooley. The plot stayed relatively true to the novel, but the ending was changed completely. The film was not well received, however Cyd Hayman received an award for best actress at the Sitges - Catalan International Film Festival for her role as "Kate Marlowe".

In 1993, Yves Simoneau directed a film version of Mother's Boys which starred Jamie Lee Curtis. With the exception of character names, this film was little or nothing like the novel on which it was based. Many critics felt that Simoneau borrowed from numerous other stalker dramas and attempted to ratchet the action to a feverish pitch in the conclusion. Most critics found Mother's Boys an unconvincing, often over-the-top psychodrama. The film underperformed drastically at the box office, but is available on Region 1 DVD.

== Work in television ==
Taylor was commissioned to write a sitcom series for the BBC, entitled Maggie: It's Me. The plot revolved around a character named Allie who wanted to change her life, so she dumps her boyfriend to "teach him a lesson" and moves in with her friend Maggie. Frances de la Tour was cast as Maggie, and Rosemary Martin was cast as Allie. A half hour pilot was produced, and aired on 3 May 1977 but the series was never produced.

== Books ==
=== Horror/Suspense ===
- The Godsend, 1976
- Sweetheart, Sweetheart, 1977
- The Reaping, 1980
- The Moorstone Sickness, 1981
- The Kindness of Strangers, 1985
- Madeleine, 1987
- Mother's Boys, 1988
- Charmed Life, 1989
- Evil Intent, 1994
- Since Ruby, 1999
- The Comeback 2016
- This is Midnight (collected short stories) 2017

=== Works of non-fiction ===
- Cruelly Murdered, 1979
- Perfect Murder (with Stephen Knight), 1987
- Murder At the Priory (with Kate Clarke), 1988
- There Must be Evil, 2016.

=== Works written under the pseudonym Jess Foley ===
- So Long at the Fair, 2002
- Too Close to the Sun, 2002
- Wait for the Dawn, 2004
- Saddle the Wind, 2004
- No Wings to Fly, 2006

== Short stories ==
(published in various anthologies)

- "Forget me Not"
- "Our Last Nanny"
- "My Very Good Friend"
- "Out of Sorts"
- "Travelling Light"
- "Samhain"
- "Cera"
- "Pat-a-Cake, Pat-a-Cake"
