= Mask of Murder =

1985 film by Arne Mattsson

- Directed by: Arne Mattsson
- Written by: Volodja Semitjov
- Produced by: Tommy Iwering
- Starring: Rod Taylor; Christopher Lee; Valerie Perrine
- Music by: Björn J:son Lindh
- Release date: 1988
- Running time: 89 mins
- Countries: Sweden; Canada
- Language: English

Mask of Murder is a 1985 Swedish-Canadian film directed by Arne Mattsson, about a serial killer in a small Canadian town.

== Plot ==
In a Canadian town, women are being killed by a serial murderer.

== Cast ==
- Rod Taylor as Supt. Bob McLaine
- Valerie Perrine as Marianne McLaine
- Christopher Lee as Chief Supt. Jonathan Rich
- Sam Cook as Supt. Ray Cooper
- Terrence Hardiman as Dr. Paul Crossland
- Heinz Hopf as Carlos
- Christine McKenna as Vicky Moore
- Cyd Hayman as Child Psychologist
- Hjördis Petterson as Ida Swanson

== Production ==
The movie was shot in Sweden.
