= Fallout (Heroes) =

- Heroes episode
- Episode no.: Season 1 Episode 11
- Directed by: John Badham
- Written by: Joe Pokaski
- Cinematography by: John Aronson
- Editing by: Donn Aron
- Original release date: December 4, 2006
- Running time: 43 minutes

Guest appearances
- Clea DuVall as Audrey Hanson; Nora Zehetner as Eden McCain; James Kyson as Ando Masahashi; Zachary Quinto as Sylar; Thomas Dekker as Zach; Jimmy Jean-Louis as The Haitian

Episode chronology
← Previous "Six Months Ago"	Next → "Godsend"
- Heroes season 1

"Fallout" is the eleventh episode of the first season of the American superhero drama television series Heroes. The episode was written by Joe Pokaski, and directed by John Badham. It originally aired on NBC on December 4, 2006.

The series tells the stories of ordinary people who discover that they have superhuman abilities and how these abilities take effect in the characters' lives as they work together to prevent catastrophic futures. In the episode, Peter is arrested for the Homecoming incident, while Mr. Bennet assigns the Haitian to erase Claire's memory.

According to Nielsen Media Research, the episode was seen by an estimated 14.94 million household viewers and gained a 5.5 ratings share among adults aged 18–49. It received critical acclaim, with critics praising the build-up, character development and writing, with many considering it the best episode of the series at that point.

== Plot ==
Mr. Bennet is bringing Claire home amidst a discussion regarding her powers. Mr. Bennet admits to Claire that he knew about her powers even before she did. He tells her he was trying to protect her. He warns her that there are other bad men who will try to hurt her if they find out she's special. He asks her who else knows about her powers. Claire tells him that Zach knows all about her ability and what she is capable of, and that Lyle found out after stealing one of the films of Claire.

After leaving Sylar, Mr. Bennet meets with Eden, who does not want to keep Sylar alive. She tells him she could use her powers to make him kill himself, but Mr. Bennet says they are under orders to keep him alive. Eden is stating that if the Haitian could speak he would echo her sentiments. She goes into Isaac's room, states that she is "going off the reservation" and won't see him again. Isaac reveals that he feels he should be trying to change the apocalyptic future that he is drawing.

Meanwhile, Hiro and Ando have arrived at Claire's school as it is being cleaned up after Sylar's attack. Hiro is disappointed and scared, thinking the world will end because he didn't save the cheerleader. But Hiro believes it was an "if then" statement. Ando expresses doubt, but Hiro assures him that he knows future Hiro meant it to be that way. As they walk away from the school, they get a call from Isaac Mendez.

Peter is being held in a cell at the local police station. While sitting, Nathan comes in and the two talk. The conversation takes a sudden strange turn, and Nathan transforms into Sylar. Shaken by this vision, Peter is taken to be questioned by Matt and Audrey. They acknowledge his innocence, but wonder why he's covered in his own blood if he has no wounds. Peter says that his brother told him not to say anything. Matt talks to Bennet after the interview and introduces himself, but he is visibly suspicious of Bennet.

Jessica shoots D.L. in the shoulder; she then tries to shoot him in the head, but he uses his ability to become temporarily intangible. D.L. and Micah escape, much to the chagrin of Jessica, who is chastised by Niki for her carelessness because she could have missed and shot Micah. Micah and D.L. run through the woods, leaving a fake trail for Jessica. She is ambushed by D.L. Micah tries to stop them from fighting but is flung aside by Jessica. Niki reveals that Jessica is stronger than her and that she can't be trusted, so she turns herself into the police.

Mohinder, who has arrived back in New York, gets a call from Eden, who says that she can ease his pain by killing the man responsible for his father's death. She goes to Sylar's cell, gun in hand, to command him to kill himself. She gets angry, saying she was Chandra Suresh's neighbor. Sylar yells, saying she knew what was going on and she could have stopped him. Sylar suddenly uses his powers to pull Eden through the glass and chokes her. Eden turns the gun to her head. Eden succeeded in killing herself with the gunshot before Sylar could absorb her powers, and then Sylar was subdued by Mr. Bennet and the Haitian.

Hiro and Ando meet Isaac at the Burnt Toast Diner, and they begin to discuss their powers. Isaac is in dismay that he still cannot see the future unless he's high, but mentions Sylar has been caught. Hiro looks up and Ando explains that Charlie Andrews was killed by Sylar. Realizing something, Isaac opens a sketchbook, full of pictures of Hiro and Charlie. He asks if this is Charlie, and Hiro says that it is. Isaac is surprised and thinks that he might have actually painted the future without drugs. After several tries, Isaac becomes dismayed that he can't do it without drugs.

Claire talks to Lyle about her father, but he says they haven't talked. She asks if he still remembers what she had told him and he says yes, asks her to stay where she is and tells her he loves her. As soon as she hangs up the phone, she is grabbed from behind by the Haitian, who tells her he works for her father and wiped the memories of Lyle, Zach, and apparently her mother all on her father's orders. The Haitian tells her that her father sent him to make her forget as well. This is the first time the Haitian has been observed to speak, and in fact, the previous dialogue in the episode indicated that Eden and Mr. Bennet didn't even know the Haitian could speak.

Nathan arranges for Peter's release, but when they leave the police station, Peter begins coughing and collapses.

An unconscious Peter has what appears to be a vision of New York City. Peter looks around and the other major characters start appearing out of various places. Matt stops Peter and leads D.L., Niki, and Micah away from him. Peter looks at his hands which have begun to glow bright orange. After Nathan approaches close enough, Peter screams as his whole body turns orange and explodes.

== Production ==
=== Development ===
In November 2006, NBC announced that the eleventh episode of the season would be titled "Fallout". The episode was written by Joe Pokaski, and directed by John Badham. This was Pokaski's first writing credit, and Badham's first directing credit.

== Reception ==
=== Viewers ===
In its original American broadcast, "Fallout" was seen by an estimated 14.94 million household viewers with a 5.3 in the 18–49 demographics. This means that 5.3 percent of all households with televisions watched the episode. It finished 6th out of 104 programs airing from December 4–10, 2006. This was a 4% decrease in viewership from the previous episode, which was watched by an estimated 15.56 million household viewers with a 5.5 in the 18–49 demographics.

=== Critical reviews ===
"Fallout" received critical acclaim. Robert Canning of IGN gave the episode an "amazing" 9 out of 10 and wrote, ""Fallout" was easily the best episode of the series so far, due mostly to the fact that all of our heroes were reacting to one single event."

Alan Sepinwall wrote, "what I found myself discussing with Marian when the show ended was how important Hiro is to my enjoyment of the show. So let me turn that around to the rest of you. It's obvious that, to most viewers, Hiro is their favorite character, but how watchable would "Heroes" as a whole be without the guy?" Angel Cohn of TV Guide wrote, "I thought that actually hearing Mr. Mind Wiper speak tonight was pretty darn cool, especially since Eden had said earlier that he couldn't speak. I also like that he's willing to go against his boss' direct order."

Michael Canfield of TV Squad wrote, "Promos for this "fall finale" promised a stunning climax and that "a hero will die." Show creators can't be held accountable for, shall we say, the exuberance of the network publicity machine, but we do get a great episode this time that lives up to the hype." Television Without Pity gave the episode an "A+" grade.
