= Don't Get Me Started (film) =

- Directed by: Arthur Ellis
- Written by: Arthur Ellis
- Produced by: Steve Clark-Hall
- Starring: Trevor Eve; Ralph Brown; Steven Waddington; Lorna Heilbron
- Cinematography: Gilbert Taylor
- Edited by: Michael Bradsell
- Music by: Roger Bolton
- Production companies: TiMe Medienvertriebs GmbH; Skyline Films
- Distributed by: British Film Institute
- Release dates: September 1994 (Venice Film Festival); 13 October 1994 (London Film Festival); 2 June 1995 (UK)
- Running time: 76 minutes
- Countries: United Kingdom; Germany
- Language: English

Don't Get Me Started is a 1994 Anglo-German film directed and written by Arthur Ellis. It was shown that year at the London Film Festival and at the 51st Venice Film Festival, before going on general release in British cinemas from the beginning of June 1995. The film stars Trevor Eve as Jack Lane, Ralph Brown as Larry Swift and Steven Waddington as Jerry Hoff. It was the celebrated cinematographer Gilbert Taylor's final film.

== Plot ==
Jack Lane, a murderer who has managed to get away with his crimes and build a new life for himself in suburbia, finds it difficult to give up smoking. He also struggles to overcome a sense of encroaching paranoia after meeting a stranger with a worrying interest in his past. When Lane finds out that the stranger is an investigative journalist who has discovered the truth about his identity, he resolves to take matters into his own hands.

== Cast ==
- Trevor Eve as Jack Lane
- Steven Waddington as Jerry Hoff
- Marion Bailey as Gill Lane
- Ralph Brown as Larry Swift
- Marcia Warren as Pauline Lewis
- Lorna Heilbron as Alice Kay

== Production ==
The film was originally shown out of competition at the 1993 Cannes Film Festival, where it was given the title Psychotherapy and ran for 98 minutes. Variety magazine later described the Cannes screening as "disastrous". It was then withdrawn and re-edited under the supervision of Paul Cowan and Martin Walsh.

Although set in London, it was filmed mostly on location in Cologne and Düsseldorf.

== Critical reception ==
Don't Get Me Started was regarded by critics as interesting but slight. Peter Matthews of Sight and Sound, although celebrating the film's "witty touches", viewed it as offering "scarcely more than dry conceits and tickling wordplay". Variety, meanwhile, praised Eve's "excellent" performance and conceded that the film was a "much tighter piece of work" than the original edit shown at Cannes, but concluded that it was "a neat idea on paper that doesn't survive its journey to the screen".
