= Queen of Hearts (TV play) =

- Directed by: Tim King
- Starring: Gina McKee; Mia Souteriou; Sonia Smyles; Lorna Heilbron; Paul Jesson; Rachel Bell; Maggie Wells; Dominique Barnes; Andrew Rigby; Christopher Denham; Beth Porter; Mark Elwes; David Blake Kelly; Sarah Doyle; Debbie Killingback
- Country of origin: United Kingdom

Production
- Producer: Brenda Reid
- Production company: BBC

Original release
- Network: BBC2
- Release: 11 August 1985

Queen of Hearts is a television play, written by Paula Milne, directed by Tim King, and produced by Brenda Reid. It was first shown on BBC2 on Sunday 11 August 1985, and repeated on 28 August 1985.

== Content ==
Queen of Hearts starred Shakespearean actress Lorna Heilbron as Ann Drury, a bored, frustrated, but attractive middle-class housewife living in an area where prostitution had begun to arouse comment. Two factors encouraged Mrs Drury briefly to try out being a prostitute herself: an admission by her husband (Paul Jesson) that he himself had once consorted with a call girl and her trying on some black lingerie belonging to her teenage daughter (Dominique Barnes) while she was alone in the house. Her experience with a client gave her a fresh sense of her sexuality, though her husband's rather underwhelmed response when she sought to entice him with lace underwear and stockings had the effect of returning her to her previous rather staid existence.
