= Better Halves (Heroes) =

- Heroes episode
- Episode no.: Season 1 Episode 6
- Directed by: Greg Beeman
- Written by: Natalie Chaidez
- Cinematography by: John Aronson
- Editing by: Scott Boyd
- Original release date: October 30, 2006
- Running time: 43 minutes

Guest appearances
- Nora Zehetner as Eden McCain; Jack Coleman as Noah Bennet; Ashley Crow as Sandra Bennet; James Kyson as Ando Masahashi; Thomas Dekker as Zach

Episode chronology
← Previous "Hiros"	Next → "Nothing to Hide"
- Heroes season 1

"Better Halves" is the sixth episode of the first season of the American superhero drama television series Heroes. The episode was written by co-executive producer Natalie Chaidez, and directed by co-executive producer Greg Beeman. It originally aired on NBC on October 30, 2006.

The series tells the stories of ordinary people who discover that they have superhuman abilities and how these abilities take effect in the characters' lives as they work together to prevent catastrophic futures. In the episode, Niki's husband D.L. Hawkins — who can phase through solid objects — returns after breaking out of prison, while Mohinder reconsiders the purpose of his journey.

According to Nielsen Media Research, the episode was seen by an estimated 14.89 million household viewers and gained a 5.3 ratings share among adults aged 18–49, making it the most watched episode of the series at that point. The episode received positive reviews from critics, who praised the performances and character development.

== Plot ==
After Peter finishes Isaac's painting and tells him about Future Hiro's message "Save the cheerleader, save the world" Isaac receives another confusing call from Hiro. However, this time Peter is there to pick up the phone, and he reveals his encounter with Future Hiro to Hiro and Ando. Peter then tells them to get to New York. After the call ends, Peter and Isaac attempt to locate the cheerleader by looking at Isaac's paintings, but Isaac reveals that Simone has taken one to be sold.

As Hiro and Ando prepare for a "journey" from Las Vegas to New York, they are stopped by the high-roller they cheated earlier, who coerces them to help him win a high-stakes poker game. The players are suspicious of Hiro and Ando's "winning streak". During the game, Ando discovers that one of the card players has a gun under the table. After hurrying Hiro into a bathroom to discuss their plan of escape, they hear sounds of violence and commotion in the room. The distraught pair escape through a back entrance and return to their car. Hiro struggles with his lack of bravery. Ando suggests that maybe in the future, he can travel back in time and "do it over." Somewhat cheered up, Hiro gets into the car with Ando and the two begin their trip to New York.

Meanwhile, Mohinder tells Eden about his encounter with Peter. After hearing Peter's unbelievable stories, a skeptical Mohinder has decided to give up his investigation into his father's death. He bids farewell to Eden, who kisses him before he heads back to India to bury his father. She refuses to say "good-bye," believing that Mohinder will soon return.

In Odessa, Texas, Mr. Bennet sets up a meeting between his daughter, Claire, and her biological parents. During the meeting, her "biological parents" reveal that her biological mother did not want to keep the baby and that there is a medical history of diabetes and cancer in her biological parents' families. However, Claire is disappointed that nothing they say gives her any additional information regarding her healing abilities.

When Mr. Bennet excuses himself from the meeting between Claire and her biological parents, he receives a call from Eden in New York, who relays all the intel she got from Mohinder about people with abilities and Future Hiro's message. Mr. Bennet tells her to prevent Mohinder from leaving for India and to bring in Isaac, whom she describes as a "precog".

After finishing the call, Mr. Bennet walks Claire's biological parents to their car and thanks them, stating that he doesn't think their services will be required anymore. But while cleaning up after the meeting, Sandra Bennet tells Claire how surprised she was that Mr. Bennet had found her biological parents, since when Claire was first adopted, the Bennets had frantically tried to find Claire's biological parents to no avail.

Back in Las Vegas, D.L. Hawkins unexpectedly shows up at Niki's home, where the two reconcile. They go to an apartment to find witnesses of a mystery woman who framed Hawkins, but instead find only the figures of people torn apart and strewn around, the poker players Hiro and Ando nearly died with.

Niki talks to her alter ego, who claims she is the one who stole two million dollars from Mr. Linderman, framed Hawkins for the theft, and killed his crew as well as the thugs in Niki's garage and the poker players. During that time, Micah informs his father about his mother's secret.

Niki's alter ego then convinces a distraught Niki to take the money and leave with their son, Micah. However, as the "real" Niki obtains the money hidden in her home, she is discovered by D.L., who immediately realizes her betrayal. When Hawkins threatens to take both Micah and the money, Niki's alter-ego takes control of her and begins fighting with D.L.. During the fight, Niki uses her ability to send D.L. flying with a single punch, and D.L. reveals his own ability to phase parts of his body so that it can pass through solid objects. He reaches through Niki's abdomen to choke her just as Micah runs into the room to witness the fight. Niki collapses onto the floor, and D.L. picks up a crying Micah and runs from the room.

The episode ends with Eden visiting Isaac Mendez, pretending to be a fan of his work.

== Production ==
=== Development ===
In October 2006, NBC announced that the sixth episode of the season would be titled "Better Halves". The episode was written by co-executive producer Natalie Chaidez, and directed by co-executive producer Greg Beeman. This was Chaidez's first writing credit, and Beeman's second directing credit.

== Reception ==
=== Viewers ===
In its original American broadcast, "Better Halves" was seen by an estimated 14.89 million household viewers with a 5.3 in the 18–49 demographics. This means that 5.3 percent of all households with televisions watched the episode. It finished 15th out of 102 programs airing from October 30–November 5, 2007. This was a slight increase in viewership from the previous episode, which was watched by an estimated 14.45 million household viewers with a 5.1 in the 18–49 demographics.

=== Critical reviews ===
"Better Halves" received positive reviews from critics. Robert Canning of IGN gave the episode a "good" 7.8 out of 10 and wrote, "While some of the episode comes off as filler (Hiro using his power to yet again cheat at poker), it's the bigger "super power" moments, and the unexpected twist (Claire's biological parents being impostors brought in by her father) that keep Heroes so darn entertaining."

Alan Sepinwall wrote, "no Nathan, Parkman or Simone this week. I know Peter and Isaac need to get the painting from Simone, but I'm hoping the producers have started to realize her pointlessness and are easing her out to make room for other characters like Ando and H.R.G." Angel Cohn of TV Guide wrote, "I really was beginning to think that D.L. was actually kind of a nice guy who really had just been framed and was trying to get his family back together. He was even willing to forgive Niki for taking her clothes off on the Internet to pay the bills. So much for that plan."

Michael Canfield of TV Squad wrote, "It's refreshing when characters on a show are as smart as the audience. Who better than a comics and sci-fi fan to understand the delicacy of the time-space continuum?" Television Without Pity gave the episode a "B+" grade.

Ali Larter submitted this episode for consideration for Outstanding Supporting Actress in a Drama Series at the 59th Primetime Emmy Awards.
