= Lorna Heilbron =

Scottish actress (born 1948)

- Born: 8 June 1948 (age 78); Glasgow, Scotland
- Occupation: Actress
- Spouse: Nicholas Clay (m. 1980; died 2000)
- Children: 2
- Relatives: Vivien Heilbron (sister)

Lorna Heilbron (born 8 June 1948) is a Scottish actress.

She appeared in television series such as Ace of Wands, Van der Valk, Blake's 7, Taggart, Lovejoy and Hazell.

She also starred in the horror films The Creeping Flesh (1973) and Symptoms (1974).

In the 1985 BBC TV play Queen of Hearts, she starred as a bored housewife who wore black underwear belonging to her teenaged daughter and then, fleetingly, experimented with prostitution. She also appeared in the 1988 supernatural thriller The Girl in a Swing, and the 1994 comedy drama Don't Get Me Started.

== Personal life ==
In 1980 she married actor Nicholas Clay, remaining together until his death in 2000. They had two daughters in 1983 and 1986.

She is now a therapist under the alias Lorna Clay. Her elder sister is actress Vivien Heilbron.
