= Maggie: It's Me =

Maggie: It's Me is a BBC television series pilot written by Bernard Taylor and produced by Graeme Muir. In Maggie: It's Me!, Allie leaves her boyfriend in order to 'teach him a lesson', and seeks solace with her friend Maggie. The pilot was aired on 3 May 1977, but BBC passed on the series.

== Cast ==
- Frances de la Tour – Maggie
- Rosemary Martin – Allie
