= The Creeping Flesh =

1973 film by Freddie Francis

- Theatrical release poster
- Directed by: Freddie Francis
- Written by: Peter Spenceley; Jonathan Rumbold
- Produced by: Michael P. Redbourn
- Starring: Christopher Lee; Peter Cushing; Lorna Heilbron
- Cinematography: Norman Warwick
- Edited by: Oswald Hafenrichter
- Music by: Paul Ferris
- Production company: World Film Services
- Distributed by: Tigon British Film Productions (UK); Columbia Pictures (US)
- Release dates: 1973 (UK); 12 February 1973 (U.S.)
- Running time: 94 minutes
- Country: United Kingdom
- Language: English

The Creeping Flesh is a 1973 British horror film directed by Freddie Francis, written by Peter Spenceley and Jonathan Rumbold, and starring Christopher Lee, Peter Cushing, and Lorna Heilbron.

== Plot ==
Victorian era scientist Professor Emmanuel Hildern meets a young doctor in what appears to be a laboratory. Hildern claims to need help, having discovered a form of evil that is real, a living being, and which he has unwittingly unleashed thousands of years too soon. He then recounts how his discovery was made.

In a flashback, Hildern returns in 1894 from an expedition to New Guinea where he discovered an abnormally large humanoid skeleton. The skeleton is older than previously recovered specimens, but also more advanced. Hildern hopes the discovery will earn him the prestigious Richter Prize. He has little time to rejoice before receiving word that his wife, institutionalised for years, has died. Emmanuel's half-brother James runs the asylum where she was held in secret. While visiting the asylum, James tells Emmanuel that he made a psychiatric study of her and plans to publish the findings in the hope of winning the Richter Prize. James also mentions that he will no longer subsidise Emmanuel's expeditions.

Returning home with a new urgency to complete his research, Emmanuel discovers that the skeleton grows flesh when exposed to water. Emmanuel reviews ancient myths of the region where the skeleton was discovered, which tell of giants who will be roused by rain. The skeleton might be the remains of one of those beings, and would not have been discovered before for millennia of erosion revealed its resting place. By that time, the science of the region's inhabitants would have grown sophisticated enough to deal with the giant's "evil." Emmanuel believes that if evil can live as an organism, then it can be biologically contained and eradicated like a disease. Using cells formed around the skeleton's fleshy finger – which Hildern removes – he develops what he believes to be a serum against evil. Testing the serum on a monkey, Emmanuel notes positive results.

Meanwhile, his daughter Penelope learns of her mother's death. Having been told for years that her mother was dead, Penelope is shocked when learning that her mother was alive and institutionalised. Worried that Penelope's emotional outburst may be a sign that she has inherited her mother's insanity, Emmanuel injects her with the serum.

The next day, Emmanuel is shocked to see that the monkey went berserk, having gained the strength to escape from its cage and wreak havoc in the lab. Penelope also left the house and went to the city. After being assaulted by a man, she assaults various men at a tavern and then, when chased by other patrons, murders an escaped asylum patient at a warehouse. Because the dead man was an escapee from the asylum, James sent men to the city. They apprehend Penelope and bring her to the asylum, where a blood test reveals the serum. James realises that Emmanuel experimented on Penelope, which could unleash a scandal should it become known. Given that James's experiments have stalled – threatening his own chances of winning the Richter Prize – James decides to steal Emmanuel's research, including the skeleton.

James's thief carries the skeleton out of the lab and unwittingly exposes it to rain. When the carriage taking the skeleton overturns, the skeleton - now coming alive - escapes. Emmanuel tries to follow the carriage, but turns back after seeing a cloaked figure nearby. Returning home, Emmanuel finds that the skeleton's fleshy finger has begun to move. Terrified, he throws it into the fire. The creature, now encased in flesh but otherwise hollow, eventually appears and removes Emmanuel's finger, but spares his life.

Emmanuel finishes his account. His "lab" is revealed to be a cell in the asylum, and he an apparent inmate. The visiting physician consults with James, who scoffs at the claim that he is Emmanuel's brother, or that Penelope – another inmate who has gone insane – is Emmanuel's daughter. James finds it normal for his patients to want to identify with him, given that he is an authority figure. James reveals that the man claiming to be his brother arrived there about the time that James won the Richter Prize. At his cell, a distraught Emmanuel pleads for someone to help him. His left hand is missing a finger matching the one that he removed from the skeleton.

== Cast ==
- Christopher Lee as Dr. James Hildern
- Peter Cushing as Prof. Emmanuel Hildern
- Lorna Heilbron as Penelope Hildern
- Jenny Runacre as Marguerite Hildern
- George Benson as Prof. Waterlow
- Kenneth J. Warren as Charles Lenny
- Duncan Lamont as Inspector
- Harry Locke as barman
- Hedger Wallace as Dr. Perry
- Michael Ripper as Carter
- Catherine Finn as Emily
- Robert Swann as young aristocrat
- David Bailie as young doctor
- Maurice Bush as Karl
- Tony Wright as sailor
- Marianne Stone as female assistant
- Alexandra Dane as whore
- Larry Taylor as warder #1
- Martin Carroll as warder #2
- Dan Meaden as lunatic
- Sue Bond as girl in tavern

== Production ==
Freddie Francis replaced Don Sharp as director at the last minute. Francis would later say, "Peter Cushing was excellent in it, as he always is. [... He] seemed to convince everybody it was real. Even I [...] listened to Peter talking all this rubbish on the screen, and I think 'that must be true'. [...] Peter is the greatest guy at speaking unbelievable dialogue and making you believe it."

Filming took place in Surrey, at Shepperton Studios and Thorpe House. Craze (1973) also was shot at Thorpe House.

== Release ==
The film premiered in the UK and US on 1 January 1973.

== Reception ==
The Monthly Film Bulletin wrote: "After the crudities of Tales from the Crypt, The Creeping Flesh comes as a welcome surprise. The film is hampered by an obtrusively contrived narrative and by the fact that the parallels between the brothers and their experiments are somewhat schematic; but the theme of the different attempts to locate and hence control evil ... is interestingly and sensitively worked out. The preponderance of long-shots ensures that, despite the presence of Britain's two most prominent horror stars, The Creeping Flesh is above all an ensemble film, concerned with the interconnection of actions and drives. It also distances the spectator, encouraging him to see each action in the context of the total pattern rather than isolating effects for the sake of impact. This comparative restraint accords well with the film's overall melancholy and pessimism. The effect on Penelope of discovering the truth about her mother is quietly expressed in the toppling over of the paper marionette in the miniature theatre with which she has been playing; and the climactic sequences, right up to the final attack on Emmanuel, gain particularly from the reticent treatment of the resurrected embodiment of Evil – a black-hooded, monk-like figure moving in longshot slowly, silently and relentlessly through the darkness. Paul Ferris' score, less striking than his Witchfinder General music, is also used with restraint to establish the pervasive tone of melancholy and desolation rather than of simple horror. The film suffers from the somewhat squalid bourgeois morality which afflicts so much British popular art ...; but in this case, the intelligence and vivacity of Lorna Heilbron's performance arouse so much sympathy for Penelope's release from Victorian repression that the total effect is more ambiguous."

On Rotten Tomatoes, the film has an 83% approval rating, with an average rating of 6/10, based on reviews from 6 critics.

Gary Susman, writing for Time, concludes that "you can read the whole thing as a satire, on Victorian sexual expression, outdated science, and imperialism, but it's easier just to sit back and scream at the elegant creepiness of Cushing and Lee or the awful spectacle of that wriggling finger."

In his review for the online film journal Offscreen, Donato Totaro opines: "Although The Creeping Flesh is unevenly paced in moments and contains a sometimes maligned plot, a close analysis reveals a film marked by an interesting use of parallel montage, subtle thematic meaning imparted in the mise en scène, and a possible social message submerged within the slightly ludicrous apocalyptic scenario, dealing with the suppression of women in Victorian England (it would be too much of a stretch to read this as feminist)."

== Home media ==
The Creeping Flesh was released on DVD in the UK by DD Home Entertainment on 19 May 2004. However, it was withdrawn shortly afterward, due to a dispute over rights.

On 4 April 2017, in the US, Mill Creek Entertainment released the film, along with The Brotherhood of Satan (1971) and Torture Garden (1967), in a Blu-ray set titled Psycho Circus.
