= Heroes season 1 =

Heroes
- Season 1
- DVD cover
- Starring: Santiago Cabrera; Jack Coleman; Tawny Cypress; Noah Gray-Cabey; Greg Grunberg; Ali Larter; Masi Oka; Hayden Panettiere; Adrian Pasdar; Sendhil Ramamurthy; Leonard Roberts; Milo Ventimiglia
- No. of episodes: 23

Release
- Original network: NBC
- Original release: September 25, 2006 – May 21, 2007

Season chronology
- Next → Season 2

The NBC superhero serial drama series Heroes follows the lives of people across the globe who possess various superhuman powers as they struggle to cope with their everyday lives and prevent foreseen disasters from occurring. The series premiered on American and Canadian television on September 25, 2006. The first season, which finished 21st of 142 American primetime television programs in Nielsen ratings, was released on DVD and HD DVD on August 28, 2007. The Blu-ray was released on August 26, 2008. Within the seasons of the show are "volumes", which allow the writers to focus on shorter story arcs. The first season comprises a single volume of 23 episodes called Genesis, which is also the same title of the show's pilot episode.

== Plot ==
The plot of Heroes is designed to be similar to the stories of comic books with small story arcs built into the series' larger story arc plot. Each season of Heroes is designed to involve ordinary people who discover extraordinary super powers, and how these abilities take effect in the character's daily lives.

The first season, known as "Genesis", begins as a seemingly ordinary group of people gradually becomes aware that they have special abilities. Events illustrate their reactions to these powers, and how the discovery affects their personal and professional lives. At the same time, several ordinary individuals are investigating the origins and extent of these abilities. Mohinder continues his late father's research into the biological source of the change, while Noah represents a secret organization known only as "The Company". While coping with these new abilities, each of the characters is drawn, willingly or unwillingly, into the Company's conspiracy to control superpowered people and into a race to stop an explosion from destroying New York City. Meanwhile, focus is placed on Peter Petrelli as he tries to maintain his volatile power, and Sylar, a serial killer hunting superhumans.

== Cast and characters ==
- Milo Ventimiglia as Peter Petrelli, the protagonist; a nurse and Nathan's brother, gains the abilities of evolved humans who come near him.
- Hayden Panettiere as Claire Bennet, a high school cheerleader with the power of rapid cellular regeneration. Marc Hirschfeld, executive vice president of casting for NBC Universal Television stated, "When they were trying to decide who the cheerleader should be, I literally picked up the phone and said to the producers, 'You've got to meet Hayden Panettiere.'"
- Jack Coleman as Noah Bennet, or "Horn-Rimmed Glasses" (recurring episodes 1 to 10), Claire's father and employee of the Company.
- Tawny Cypress as Simone Deveaux, Peter's friend and Isaac's girlfriend.
- Leonard Roberts as D. L. Hawkins, a convict who can walk through solid objects.
- Santiago Cabrera as Isaac Mendez, a painter and drug addict with the ability to paint the future.
- Masi Oka as Hiro Nakamura, an office worker who possesses the ability of space-time manipulation. This allows him to teleport, stop time, or travel through time, but recent events in the series have prevented him from regaining his full abilities. Hiro was one of the last main characters to be created by Tim Kring; he was added to the pilot episode after Kring's wife noticed none of the existing main characters were happy about their powers.
- Greg Grunberg as Matt Parkman is a police officer with the power to read minds.
- Adrian Pasdar as Nathan Petrelli, an anti-hero and New York senator who can fly.
- Noah Gray-Cabey as Micah Sanders, Niki and D.L.'s son and a technopath.
- Ali Larter as Niki Sanders, D.L. Hawkins' wife and Micah Sanders' mother. She is a single mother with a dangerous alter-ego and super-strength.
  - Larter also plays Jessica Sanders, Niki's split personality.
- Sendhil Ramamurthy as Mohinder Suresh, a scientist who continues his father's research on super-powered humans.

=== Recurring characters ===
- James Kyson Lee as Ando Masahashi
- Zachary Quinto as Gabriel Gray/Sylar
- Ashley Crow as Sandra Bennet
- Jimmy Jean-Louis as Haitian
- Cristine Rose as Angela Petrelli
- Thomas Dekker as Zach
- Lisa Lackey as Janice Parkman
- Matthew John Armstrong as Ted Sprague
- Christopher Eccleston as Claude Rains
- Nora Zehetner as Eden McCain
- Clea DuVall as Audrey Hanson
- Randall Bentley as Lyle Bennet
- Missy Peregrym as Candice Wilmer
- Danielle Savre as Jackie Wilcox
- Eric Roberts as Eric Thompson
- Adair Tishler as Molly Walker
- Rena Sofer as Heidi Petrelli
- Malcolm McDowell as Daniel Linderman

== Episodes ==
No. overall	No. in season	Title	Directed by	Written by	Original release date	US viewers (millions)
Volume One: Genesis
1	1	"Genesis"	David Semel	Tim Kring	September 25, 2006	14.10
In October 2006, people around the world discover that they have superpowers. High school student Claire Bennet finds herself spontaneously regenerating. Heroin addict Isaac Mendez can precognitively paint future events, including a nuclear explosion in New York City. Japanese office worker Hiro Nakamura is able to teleport and time travel. Nurse Peter Petrelli experiences visions that convince him he can fly. Indian scientist Mohinder Suresh travels to New York to continue his recently deceased father's work by finding these people. A mobster named Daniel Linderman sends two men to Niki Sanders's home to collect a loan that she has not repaid. Niki blacks out and later finds the men dead.
2	2	"Don't Look Back"	Allan Arkush	Tim Kring	October 2, 2006	12.96
Hiro time travels more than a month into the future of New York City; there he finds Isaac dead, and witnesses a nuclear explosion. Politician Nathan Petrelli tries to dismiss his recent self-propelled flight, and lies to his brother Peter about it. Policeman Matt Parkman uses his telepathic powers to find a girl named Molly Walker, whose parents have been recently murdered by a serial killer called Sylar. Parkman is nearly arrested by his colleagues because of this.
3	3	"One Giant Leap"	Greg Beeman	Jeph Loeb	October 9, 2006	13.34
Peter begins to date Isaac's ex-girlfriend Simone. Hiro returns to the present and seeks the help of his friend, Ando Masahashi, to save New York from the upcoming explosion. Mohinder, who has been working with his father's neighbor Eden, discovers that Sylar was connected to his father. Claire's classmate Brody attempts to rape her and accidentally kills her in the process.
4	4	"Collision"	Ernest Dickerson	Bryan Fuller	October 16, 2006	12.96
Matt is kidnapped by Claire's father and a Haitian. Hiro and Ando gamble in Vegas using Hiro's ability to freeze time, but are soon evicted from the hotel and assaulted by the security staff. Niki's alter ego Jessica, has sex with Nathan to repay her debt to Linderman. After she regenerates from her mortal injuries, Claire takes Brody for a car ride and intentionally crashes into a brick wall.
5	5	"Hiros"	Paul Shapiro	Michael Green	October 23, 2006	14.45
A Hiro from the future—who can speak English fluently—appears to Peter. He instructs Peter to save a cheerleader in order to save the world. Niki has no memories of the night before. Claire tells her father about Brody and her father secretly instructs the Haitian to erase Brody's mind.
6	6	"Better Halves"	Greg Beeman	Natalie Chaidez	October 30, 2006	14.89
Mohinder gives up searching for superhumans and returns to India. Niki's husband D.L. Hawkins—who can phase through solid objects—returns after breaking out of prison. He takes his son Micah Sanders from Niki, who he thinks framed him for murder.
7	7	"Nothing to Hide"	Donna Deitch	Jesse Alexander	November 6, 2006	14.47
Matt works with the FBI to identify Sylar. They interrogate Ted Sprague, who can emit radiation. Parkman, by telepathy, accidentally finds out that his wife is cheating on him. Micah Sanders is revealed to have the power of technopathy.
8	8	"Seven Minutes to Midnight"	Paul Edwards	Tim Kring	November 13, 2006	15.08
Hiro and Ando meet diner waitress Charlie Andrews, who can perfectly remember everything that she has learned. Charlie is killed by Sylar shortly afterwards, and Hiro goes back in time to save her. In India, a mysterious boy visits Mohinder in his dreams, causing him to consider resuming his father's research. With Isaac now in his custody, Bennet learns that Claire will soon be killed by Sylar.
9	9	"Homecoming"	Greg Beeman	Adam Armus & Kay Foster	November 20, 2006	16.03
Peter, despite warnings pointing to his death, rushes to the aid of the cheerleader, despite being convinced he is powerless alone. Claire's father forbids his daughter to go to Homecoming, fearing that she will be killed. Claire sneaks out, and is attacked by Sylar, but is rescued by Peter, who manages to hold him off before falling, dying and subsequently regenerating. Mohinder decides to continue his father's work.
10	10	"Six Months Ago"	Allan Arkush	Aron Eli Coleite	November 27, 2006	15.56
Most of the events in this episode take place six months prior to the events in the previous episode. Hiro seeks to change Charlie's death by going back in time, but finds out that her death is inevitable—she has a blood clot in her brain. Suresh's father meets Gabriel Gray and runs some tests on him. Gabriel adopts the name of Sylar and kills people to take their abilities. Hiro returns to the present.
11	11	"Fallout"	John Badham	Joe Pokaski	December 4, 2006	14.94
Matt and the FBI investigate the Homecoming killing at Claire's school, having arrested Peter at the scene. When Matt tries to read Claire's mind he cannot because the Haitian is blocking his telepathy. Later, Matt tries listening in on Bennet with the same results, but does hear one word: "Sylar". Unbeknownst to the investigators, Sylar has already been captured by Bennet. The Haitian is ordered by Bennet to erase memories from Claire, her mother, her brother, and one of her friends, pertaining to her regenerative abilities. The Haitian does not erase Claire's memory, instead swearing her to secrecy. Niki turns herself in to the police to protect DL and Micah from Jessica. After being released from custody, Peter collapses in front of the police station and experiences a vision suggesting he is the cause of the atomic explosion in New York. When trying to explain his vision to Nathan, he falls into a coma.
12	12	"Godsend"	Paul Shapiro	Tim Kring	January 22, 2007	14.90
Hiro goes on a quest to retrieve the sword of Feudal Japanese hero Takezo Kensei after meeting with Isaac and seeing his paintings. Peter has more visions of himself exploding and there is a man whom he does not know in his new visions. Peter later meets this man, who calls himself Claude Rains. Claude can become invisible. Certain heroes, Isaac, Hiro, Ando, Nathan, and Simone, begin converging at Issac's loft to discuss the future. Parkman and the FBI go to the Texan paper company where Bennet works with the hope of finding Sylar, but they cannot find him.
13	13	"The Fix"	Terrence O'Hara	Natalie Chaidez	January 29, 2007	13.63
Claude agrees to teach Peter how to control his powers. Matt's wife reveals that she is pregnant. Claire contacts her biological mother Meredith Gordon, who possesses pyrokinesis.
14	14	"Distractions"	Jeannot Szwarc	Michael Green	February 5, 2007	14.61
Sylar escapes from Bennet's captivity. Claude is convinced that Peter's loved ones are distracting him. To prove this, they follow Simone who kisses Isaac. Claire meets Meredith in person. Isaac contacts Bennet, whom he had previously met, to tell him about a painting that he had finished that shows Peter becoming invisible.
15	15	"Run!"	Roxann Dawson	Adam Armus & Kay Foster	February 12, 2007	14.68
Meredith informs Claire's biological father, Nathan, that Claire is alive. Meredith blackmails him for $100,000 by agreeing to keep quiet about this, as it could ruin his political career. Linderman gets Niki/Jessica out of prison and employs her as an assassin. Her first job is to kill a man (who has employed Parkman as his bodyguard after he is dismissed from the police force) who stole money from Linderman. Jessica is successful and is told her next target: Nathan. Mohinder unknowingly allows Sylar, who is now impersonating Zane Taylor, to join him on his quest to find those with superpowers.
16	16	"Unexpected"	Greg Beeman	Jeph Loeb	February 19, 2007	14.10
Bennet and the Haitian pursue Peter and leave a gun with Isaac. Claude leaves Peter because he does not want to become involved with Bennet again. Ted and Parkman agree to go get answers from Bennet. Peter confronts Isaac about his betrayal and Simone is accidentally shot and killed.
17	17	"Company Man"	Allan Arkush	Bryan Fuller	February 25, 2007 (Note: This episode aired on the Global Television Network in Canada a day earlier than on NBC in the United States.)	14.42
Matt and Ted take the Bennet family hostage. Ted loses control of his powers and burns the Bennets' house. In flashbacks, Bennet is given Claire on the condition that he return her to the Company that he works for (that includes Hiro's father Kaito) if her powers manifest. Bennet explains this as the reason why he is so protective of Claire. Bennet orders the Haitian to escape with Claire.
18	18	"Parasite"	Kevin Bray	Christopher Zatta	March 4, 2007	14.90
Claire and the Haitian go to the house of Nathan and Peter's mother, Angela, who is also Claire's grandmother. Jessica/Niki returns to her home with D.L. and Micah. Hiro steals the sword that he has been seeking. Ando comes back to assist Hiro. Hiro successfully gains back his teleporting power and immediately transports himself and Ando to the future. Isaac paints pictures of himself with his head cut open after being killed by Sylar. Sylar attacks Mohinder and Peter. Bennet is deceived by Candice Wilmer, who works for the Company and has the ability to change her appearance. Nathan confronts Linderman, who promises Nathan that he will win the upcoming election for congress and will be living in the White House in a few years.
19	19	".07%"	Adam Kane	Chuck Kim	April 23, 2007	11.96
Linderman reveals that his plan for Nathan includes Peter exploding. Linderman also shows Nathan one of Isaac's paintings, in which Nathan is the President of the United States. Peter and Suresh escape from Sylar, but Peter is killed. Mohinder takes him to the Petrelli's house where Claire now is and she ends up reviving Peter. Claire meets her biological father, Nathan, for the first time. Suresh joins the Company. Sylar kills Isaac and paints a picture of himself in which he is the President. Candice morphs into Niki and takes Micah to Linderman. Ted, Matt and Bennet escape from the Company's captivity and decide to disable the Company's Walker Tracking System in New York. Hiro and Ando, in New York 5 years in the future, go to Isaac's house and eventually meet another Hiro.
20	20	"Five Years Gone"	Paul Edwards	Joe Pokaski	April 30, 2007	11.92
Hiro and Ando find themselves five years after the destruction of New York. People with extraordinary abilities are labeled as terrorists and Sylar, who has assumed the form of Nathan, is the President. Hiro and Ando eventually return to the present with the help of future Peter and Hiro finds out that he must kill Sylar to prevent the potential future that they had just visited from happening.
21	21	"The Hard Part"	John Badham	Aron Eli Coleite	May 7, 2007	11.14
Mohinder is introduced to Molly, who can normally locate any individual, but she has the Shanti Virus that killed Mohinder's sister many years before. Mohinder uses his own blood to cure Molly. D.L. and Jessica go to Linderman's office. Hiro and Ando follow Sylar to Sylar's mother's house, where Sylar accidentally kills his own mother. Ted, Matt, and Bennet arrive in New York and reunite with Claire and Peter. Peter gains Ted's radioactive power.
22	22	"Landslide"	Greg Beeman	Jesse Alexander	May 14, 2007	11.54
Hiro's father teaches Hiro how to use a sword. Candice gets Micah to rig the election for Nathan to win. D.L. kills Linderman, but is shot in the process. Sylar kills Ted. Hiro prepares to face Sylar. Matt and Bennet find the Company's Walker Tracking System: Molly Walker.
23	23	"How to Stop an Exploding Man"	Allan Arkush	Tim Kring	May 21, 2007	13.48
Niki and Jessica come to peace as they rescue Micah. Hiro teleports Ando back to Japan to keep him safe. The Heroes face off against Sylar. Matt gets four bullets to his chest, Hiro impales Sylar before teleporting to 1671 Japan, and Nathan flies Peter high above New York to detonate.

== Production ==
=== Conception ===
Heroes began development early in 2006, when Tim Kring, creator of NBC's Crossing Jordan, came up with the show's concept. Kring wanted to create a "large ensemble saga" that would connect with the audience. He began thinking about how big, scary and complicated he felt the world is, and wanted to create a character-driven series about people who could do something about it. Kring felt that a cop or medical drama did not have characters that were big enough to save the world. He came up with the thought of superheroes; ordinary people who would discover extraordinary abilities, while still rooted in the real world and in reality. Casting directors Jason La Padura and Natalie Hart brought forth a cast of new faces such as Milo Ventimiglia who described the pilot as a "character drama about everyday people with a heightened reality." A heightened reality that was brought to light through the work of production designer Ruth Ammon. Kring wanted the series to have touchstones that involved the characters and the world they lived in.

Before he began putting his ideas together, he spoke with Lost executive producer Damon Lindelof, with whom he had worked for three years on Crossing Jordan. Kring credits Lindelof for giving him ideas on how to pitch the series to the network and advice on the lessons he (Lindelof) learned about working on a serialized drama. The two still speak and support each other's projects. When Kring pitched the idea for Heroes to the NBC network, he described the network's reaction as "excited...very supportive." He comments that he has been partners with NBC for some time based on his six-year run as showrunner for Crossing Jordan. When he pitched the pilot, he described every detail, including the cliffhanger ending. When NBC executives asked him what was going to happen next, Kring responded, "Well, you'll just have to wait and find out." After the project was greenlit, a special 73-minute version of the pilot was first screened to a large audience at the 2006 San Diego Comic-Con. It was initially reported that this unaired pilot would not be released, however it was included on the first season DVD set.

== Reception ==
=== Critical reception ===
During the series' first season, the American Film Institute named Heroes one of the ten "best television programs of the year." Doug Elfman of the Chicago Sun-Times stated, "the show's super strengths are its well-developed filmmaking, smooth pacing and a perfect cast. It views like the first hour of a fun, thoughtful movie." Barry Garron at The Hollywood Reporter also stated, "Heroes is one of TV's most imaginative creations and might, with luck, become this year's Lost." Less favorable reviews included the Philadelphia Inquirer, who commented that although the show had many "cool effects," it "lands, splat, in a pile of nonsense and dim dialogue." In response to the first pod of season one episodes, The Chicago Tribune went as far as saying, "you could watch the first few episodes of Heroes, or you could repeatedly hit yourself on the head with a brick. The effect is surprisingly similar."

On Rotten Tomatoes, the first season received an 83% approval rating, with average rating of 8.04/10, based on 18 reviews. The website's consensus reads, "The first season of Heroes promises a fresh take on the superhero genre, with enough style and foreshadowed intrigue to attract a following." At Metacritic, the Heroes pilot received a 67/100, with generally favorable reviews from critics.

=== Ratings ===
U.S. viewers for each episode in the series, broken down into its five volumes.

The pilot episode generated 14.3 million viewers, with the season high topping out at 16.03 million viewers for episode 9. When the series returned from hiatus on January 22, 2007, the ratings averaged about the same as the pilot with 14.9 million viewers. When the show went on a second hiatus during the first season, from March 4, 2007 to April 23, 2007 (7 weeks), ratings hit a new low; the lowest being 11.14 million viewers during part one of the three part finale, "The Hard Part."

=== Awards and nominations ===
By the time Heroes completed the first half of the first season, the show had already collected an assortment of honors and accolades. On December 13, 2006, the Writers Guild of America nominated the program for "best new series" of 2007. On December 14, the Hollywood Foreign Press Association nominated the program for a Golden Globe Award for "best television drama", and nominated Masi Oka (Hiro Nakamura) for Best Supporting Actor on a TV Series. On January 9, 2007, Heroes won the award for Favorite New TV Drama at the 33rd People's Choice Awards. The National Association for the Advancement of Colored People nominated Heroes on January 9, 2007 for an Image Award in the "Outstanding Drama Series" category. On February 21, 2007, it was announced that Heroes was nominated for five Saturn Awards. The nominations included "Best Network Television Series", "Best Supporting Actor in a Television Series" for both Greg Grunberg and Masi Oka, and "Best Supporting Actress in a Television Series" for Hayden Panettiere and Ali Larter. On February 22, 2008, it was announced that Heroes was again nominated for five Saturn Awards. In 2008 it was nominated for "Best Television Series on DVD."

On July 19, 2007, the Academy of Television Arts & Sciences announced their nominations for the 2007 Primetime Emmy awards. Heroes was nominated in eight categories, including Outstanding Drama Series. The first episode, "Genesis", earned six nominations: Outstanding Directing (David Semel), Outstanding Art Direction for a Single-Camera Series, Outstanding Single-Camera Picture Editing for a Drama Series, Outstanding Sound Mixing for a Comedy or Drama Series, and Outstanding Stunt Coordination. The episode "Five Years Gone" also received a nomination for Outstanding Visual Effects for a Series. Masi Oka was nominated for Outstanding Supporting Actor in a Drama Series. On September 16, 2007, the 59th Primetime Emmy Awards were held and Heroes failed to win a single Emmy award despite the eight nominations. On July 21, 2007, the Television Critics Association awarded Heroes with the prestigious Outstanding Program of the Year title during their 23rd Annual TCA Awards ceremony. The cast of Heroes was named in the 2006 Time Magazine's Person of the Year issue under "People Who Mattered".

== DVDs ==
The first DVD release of Heroes was a sampler disc, containing only the first episode, and was released in Ireland and the UK on September 3, 2007. UK Region 2 split Heroes into two halves on its initial release; part one being released on October 1, 2007 and part two on December 10, 2007. When the second part was released, a complete first season boxset was also released on the same day on both DVD and HD DVD formats The complete first season DVD includes nearly 3 hours of bonus features including: an extended 73-minute version of the pilot episode with audio commentary; 50 deleted and extended scenes; behind the scenes featurettes, including the making of Heroes, stunts, a profile of artist Tim Sale, and the score; and audio commentaries with cast, crew and show creator Tim Kring. On February 22, 2008, the Heroes Season One DVD was nominated for a 2008 Saturn Award, in the category of "Best Television Series on DVD." The complete first season was released in USA and Canada on August 28, 2007. It was released in Australia and New Zealand on September 17, 2007.

Universal Studios Home Entertainment announced that the first and second seasons would be released on Blu-ray on August 26, 2008, the same date as the DVD release of the second season.
