= Cyd Hayman =

British actress (born 1944)

- Born: 1 May 1944 (age 81); Bristol, England
- Occupation: Actor
- Years active: 1967–1998

Cyd Hayman (born 1 May 1944) is an English film and stage actress.

She appeared in the films Percy (1971), Rogue Male (1976), The Human Factor (1979), The Godsend (1980), and Mask of Murder (1988).

Her television credits include Adam Adamant Lives!, The Two Ronnies, Manhunt, Clochemerle, The Persuaders!, The Lotus Eaters, Special Branch, Space: 1999, Tales of the Unexpected, and Lame Ducks.

== Selected filmography ==
=== Film ===
Year	Title	Role	Notes
1971	Percy	Moira Warrington	
1976	Rogue Male	Rebecca	
1979	The Human Factor	Cynthia	
1980	The Godsend	Kate Marlowe	
1988	Mask of Murder	Child Psychologist	

=== Television ===
Year	Title	Role	Notes
1967	Adam Adamant Lives!	Nurse Mary Smith	Episode: "Death Begins at Seventy"
1969	Rogues' Gallery	First Lady	Episode: "A Bed-Full of Miracles"
1970	Manhunt	Nina	19 episodes
1971	Paul Temple	Melina Kouvakis	Episode: "Party Piece"
1971	The Persuaders!	Lyn	Episode: "Anyone Can Play"
1972	Clochemerle	Adele Torbayon	7 episodes
1972- 1973	The Lotus Eaters	Ruth Stewart	2 episodes
1973	Casanova '73	Mrs. Dropmore	1 episode
1974	Special Branch	Nadya Chelnov	Episode: "Rendezvous"
1975	The Rough with the Smooth	Leonie	1 episode
1975	Space: 1999	Sue Crawford	Episode: "Alpha Child"
1975	The Two Ronnies	Madame Cocotte	6 episodes - "Done to Death"
1979	Hazell	Samantha	Episode: "Hazell and the Greasy Gunners"
1980	Cowboys	Lesley Baxter	Episode: "Hurricane Lesley"
1982	Tales of the Unexpected	Janet Murdoch	Story: "A Man with a Fortune"
1984- 1985	Lame Ducks	Mrs. Kelly	6 episodes
1987	My Husband and I	Leslie Lomax	Episode: "A Woman Obsessed"
