= Angela Pleasence =

English actress (1941–2026)

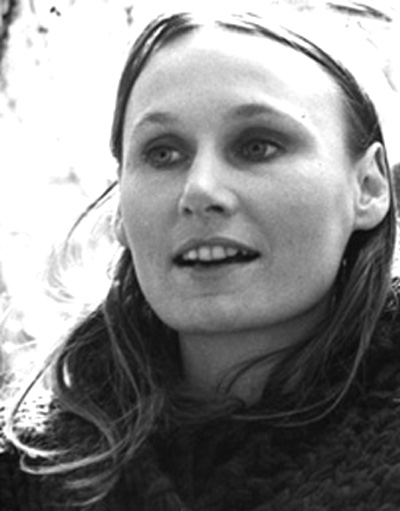
- Pleasence in 1974
- Born: Angela Daphne Anne Pleasence; 17 September 1941; Chapeltown, West Yorkshire, England
- Died: 6 April 2026 (aged 84)
- Education: Royal Academy of Dramatic Art
- Occupation: Actress
- Years active: 1964–2016
- Spouse: Michael Cadman (m. 1964; div. 1970)
- Children: 1
- Father: Donald Pleasence

Angela Daphne Anne Pleasence (/ˈplɛzəns/ PLEZ-ənss; 17 September 1941 – 6 April 2026) was an English actress. She was known for her roles in Coronation Street and Doctor Who.

Trained in theatre, Pleasence's first major film role came in Hitler: The Last Ten Days (1973), followed by roles in horror films such as From Beyond the Grave and Symptoms (1974). She then worked extensively in television productions and British miniseries throughout the 1980s and 1990s. She had minor roles in the films The Search for John Gissing (2001), Gangs of New York (2002), and The Gigolos (2005).

== Life and career ==
Pleasence was born in Chapeltown, near Sheffield, then in the County of York, West Riding, to actors Miriam Walker (later Raymond) and Donald Pleasence. She studied at the Royal Academy of Dramatic Art, graduating with an Acting (RADA Diploma) in 1965.

She married actor Michael Cadman in 1964. They had one son together and divorced in 1970.

She made her stage debut in 1964 as Titania in a production of A Midsummer Night's Dream at the Birmingham Repertory Theatre. She appeared extensively in London theatre productions throughout the 1970s.

She was known for her performance as Catherine Howard in the 1970 BBC serial The Six Wives of Henry VIII. Her other television credits include Dixon of Dock Green, Les Misérables, The Barchester Chronicles (alongside her father), Mansfield Park, Silas Marner, Midsomer Murders, Whitechapel, Agatha Christie's Poirot and Agatha Christie's Marple.

In 1978, she voiced the role of Ophelia in a BBC radio play production of Rosencrantz and Guildenstern Are Dead. Pleasence is also noted for her roles in horror films of the 1970s, including From Beyond the Grave, Symptoms, and The Godsend. She made a guest appearance satirising her earlier performances, in the parody series Dr. Terrible's House of Horrible.

She also appeared as the Ghost of Christmas Past in the 1984 holiday television film A Christmas Carol, Sister Cecilia in Stealing Heaven (1988), a crowd member in Martin Scorsese's 2002 crime drama Gangs of New York, Elizabeth I in the 2007 Doctor Who episode "The Shakespeare Code", and Winnie in the BBC drama Happy Valley (2016).

Angela Pleasence died on 6 April 2026, at the age of 84.

== Filmography ==
=== Film ===
Year	Title	Role	Notes
1968	Here We Go Round the Mulberry Bush	Scruffy Girl	
1973	The Love Ban	Mick's Secretary	
1973	Hitler: The Last Ten Days	Traudel	
1974	From Beyond the Grave	Emily Underwood	Segment 2: 'An Act of Kindness'
1974	Symptoms	Helen Ramsey	aka: The Blood Virgin
1980	The Godsend	The Stranger	
1988	Stealing Heaven	Sister Cecilia	
1991	The Favour, the Watch and the Very Big Fish	Louis' Sister	
1996	The Shaman	Shaman	Short film
1997	The Pig's Family	Rosy	Short film
2001	The Search for John Gissing	Johanna Frielduct	
2002	Gangs of New York	Woman Accomplice	
2005	Waverley	Waverley	Short film
2006	The Gigolos	Joy	
2011	Your Highness	Mother	

=== Television ===
Year	Title	Role	Notes
1965	Armchair Mystery Theatre	Ginny	Episode: "The Madam"
1966	Seven Deadly Sins	Eileen	Episode: "The Erpingham Camp"
1967	Sir Arthur Conan Doyle	Maid	Episode: "The Chemistry of Love"
1967	Seven Deadly Virtues	Carol	Episode: "The Whole Truth"
1968	Coronation Street	Monica Sutton	Recurring role; 4 episodes
1969	The Possessed	Marie Shatov	Miniseries; 2 episodes
1969	The Expert	Tina	Episode: "One Life - More or Less"
1969	Plays of Today	Jackson	Episode: "The Ladies: Joan"
1969	The Wednesday Play	Liz	Episode: "Birthday"
1969	The Wednesday Play	Beatrice Grayson	Episode: "The Last Train through Harecastle Tunnel"
1969	Destiny of a Spy	Peace Girl	Television film
1970	The Six Wives of Henry VIII	Catherine Howard	Miniseries; 2 episodes
1970	Paul Temple	Betty Martin	Episode: "Letters from Robert"
1974	Play of the Month	Julia	Episode: "The Wood Demon"
1974	Aquarius	Jean	Episode: "Oh Lovely Wall"
1975	Play for Today	Nell Hamer	Episode: "Breath"
1975	Churchill's People	Jorild	Episode: "The Conquerors"
1975	A Legacy	Clara von Felden/von Bernin	Miniseries; 4 episodes
1976	Dixon of Dock Green	Alice Benfield	Episode: "Alice"
1978	Les Misérables	Fantine	Television film
1979	Murder at the Wedding	Pam Appleyard	Miniseries; 3 episodes
1981	The Walls of Jericho	Elsie Inglis	Miniseries; 2 episodes
1982	The Hothouse	Miss Cutts	Television film
1982	The Barchester Chronicles	Mrs. Grantly	Miniseries; 7 episodes
1983	Mansfield Park	Lady Bertram	Miniseries; 6 episodes
1984	A Christmas Carol	Ghost of Christmas Past	Television film
1985	Silas Marner: The Weaver of Raveloe	Molly Farren	Television film
1986	Girls on Top	R.S.C Actress #2	Episode: "Mr. Yummy Brownie"
1986	Anastasia: The Mystery of Anna	Clara (madwoman)	Miniseries; 2 episodes
1989	Somewhere to Run	Anita Fitzpatrick	Television film
1993	Casualty	Sonia	Episode: "Everybody Needs Somebody"
1995	The Bill	Mrs. Sadler	Episode: "In the Midnight Hour"
1996	September	Lottie Carstairs	Television film
1997	Crime Traveller	Mrs. Beavis	Episode: "The Broken Crystal"
1998	Midsomer Murders	Doris Winstanley	Episode: "Death of a Hollow Man"
1998	Cider with Rosie	Crabby	Television film
2001	Dr. Terrible's House of Horrible	Lizzy	Episode: "Scream Satan Scream!"
2003	The Bill	Martha	Episode: "Cross Transfer"
2004	Agatha Christie's Marple	Miss Hartnell	Episode: "The Murder at the Vicarage"
2006	Doctors	Amy Edgeworth	Episode: "A Slip of the Mind"
2007	Doctor Who	Queen Elizabeth I	Episode: "The Shakespeare Code"
2008	Agatha Christie's Poirot	Nanny	Episode: "Appointment with Death"
2009	Casualty	Catherine	Episode: "All You Need Is Love"
2011	The Sarah Jane Adventures	Mystic Mags	Episode: "The Curse of Clyde Langer: Part Two"
2013	Whitechapel	Louise Iver	Series 4 regular; 6 episodes
2016	Happy Valley	Winnie	Recurring role; 2 episodes
