= The Godsend =

1976 novel by Bernard Taylor

- First edition
- Author: Bernard Taylor
- Language: English
- Publication date: 1976

The Godsend is a horror novel by British writer Bernard Taylor. It is his debut novel and was first published in 1976 by Souvenir Press.

== Plot summary ==
The story concerns the Marlowe family and an abandoned child named Bonnie, who they take into their home after she is left with them by a mysterious woman they meet on a day out at a nearby lake. The story is told in first person by Alan Marlowe, the father of the family, who gradually starts to suspect that the subsequent tragic deaths of his children were caused by Bonnie.

== Adaptations ==
The story was adapted into a film released in 1980 directed by Gabrielle Beaumont and starring Malcolm Stoddard, Cyd Hayman and Angela Pleasence. The film made its DVD debut courtesy of Shout! Factory and MGM Home Entertainment on August 20, 2013 and in summer 2015 for the first time on Blu-Ray via Scream Factory.
