= Rosemary Martin =

British actress (1936–1998)

- Rosemary Martin (with Blake Butler as Mr. Wainwright) as Mrs. Partridge in Last of the Summer Wine
- Born: 17 December 1936; Birmingham, UK
- Died: 14 August 1998 (aged 61)
- Years active: 1964–1998
- Spouse(s): Ron Eagleton (1968–19??; divorced; 1 child); Norman Boyack (1987–19??)

Rosemary Martin (17 December 1936 – 14 August 1998) was an English actress, born in Birmingham. She appeared in dozens of films from 1964 to 1998, and is also known for television roles including Mrs. Partridge in Last of the Summer Wine, Vera in Oh No It's Selwyn Froggitt, Marjorie in Pennies from Heaven, Miss Weber in The Insurance Man, Renie Fox in Fox and Verna Johnson in Tenko.

Other TV credits include: Z-Cars, Crown Court, Bill Brand, Coronation Street, The Gentle Touch, The Sweeney, Looking for Clancy, Maggie: It's Me, Thomas & Sarah, Bergerac, The Chinese Detective, The Insurance Man, Jeeves and Wooster, Drop the Dead Donkey, Pie in the Sky, Cracker, Heartbeat, The Bill, Outside Edge, Peak Practice and EastEnders.

Her film credits include It Shouldn't Happen to a Vet (1976), Tess (1979), Britannia Hospital (1982), Slayground (1983), Secret Places (1984), The Dressmaker (1988), The Raggedy Rawney (1988), A Dry White Season (1989) and The Object of Beauty (1991). On radio, she played Mrs. Garland in The Secret Life of Rosewood Avenue in 1991.

== Death ==
Rosemary Martin died on 14 August 1998, aged 61.

== Filmography ==
Year	Title	Role	Notes
1965	Never Mention Murder	Woman at Dinner Table and Bar	Uncredited
1976	It Shouldn't Happen to a Vet	Mrs. Dalby	
1979	Tess	Mrs. Durbeyfield	
1982	Britannia Hospital	Casualty Nurse	
1983	Slayground	Dr. King	
1984	Secret Places	Mrs. MacKenzie	
1984	Laughterhouse	Continuity Girl	
1988	The Raggedy Rawney	Becky	
1988	The Dressmaker	Mrs. Manders	
1989	A Dry White Season	Mrs. Beachley	
1991	The Object of Beauty	Mrs. Doughty	
1992	Is That All There Is?	Herself	
