= Godsend (Heroes) =

- Heroes episode
- Episode no.: Season 1 Episode 12
- Directed by: Paul Shapiro
- Written by: Tim Kring
- Cinematography by: John B. Aronson
- Editing by: Scott Boyd
- Original release date: January 22, 2007
- Running time: 43 minutes

Guest appearances
- Clea DuVall as Audrey Hanson; James Kyson as Ando Masahashi; Zachary Quinto as Sylar; Cristine Rose as Angela Patrelli; Thomas Dekker as Zach; Lisa Lackey as Janice Parkman; Matthew John Armstrong as Ted Sprague; Jimmy Jean-Louis as The Haitian

Episode chronology
← Previous "Fallout"	Next → "The Fix"
- Heroes season 1

"Godsend" is the twelfth episode of the first season of the American superhero drama television series Heroes. The episode was written by series creator Tim Kring, and directed by Paul Shapiro. It originally aired on NBC on January 22, 2007.

The series tells the stories of ordinary people who discover that they have superhuman abilities and how these abilities take effect in the characters' lives as they work together to prevent catastrophic futures. In the episode, Hiro goes on a quest to retrieve a sword, while Peter meets a man who appears in his visions.

According to Nielsen Media Research, the episode was seen by an estimated 14.90 million household viewers and gained a 5.3 ratings share among adults aged 18–49. It received critical acclaim, with praise towards the writing, performances, and ending.

== Plot ==
Two weeks following the events of "Fallout", Peter remains in a coma after consecutively absorbing too many powers.

When Simone comes to visit, Nathan asks her to take him to Isaac so that he can learn more about the cause to which Peter has devoted himself.

Claire fakes memory loss in the presence of Mr. Bennet, so he doesn't discover the Haitian disobeyed an order. She is distraught that Zach has no memory of their friendship. She expresses to the Haitian how she cannot go on alone and asks for Zach's memory to be restored and for a meeting with Peter.

The Haitian informs her that he cannot restore Zach's memory and that Peter is being watched, and if she visits him, Mr. Bennet will know that she has retained her memories.

Claire recreates her original encounter with Zach in "Genesis" by asking him to videotape her as she jumps from a high platform, exhibiting her healing powers in front of him and once again placing her confidence in him.

At Primatech Paper, Mr. Bennet is unable to isolate the strands of code that determine the origin of Sylar's abilities without killing him.

At Matt Parkman's urging, a SWAT team descends on Primatech Paper in search of Sylar, but they fail to yield results and Audrey is reprimanded by her superior.

Matt confronts Mr. Bennet, threatening to continue his investigation.

Matt later returns home to find Janice ready to leave, awaiting his decision on the status of their marriage. Matt decides to tell her about his ability.

Niki remains confined in a county jail after her surrender to authorities in "Fallout". Her lawyer informs her that the District Attorney is going to seek the death penalty for her crimes; he suggests that she cooperate by revealing the location of the stolen money, but she claims to know nothing about it. Jessica then intermittently takes control of the conversation, making the lawyer question her mental stability.

D.L. Hawkins, once again living at home, is visited by a representative of Mr. Linderman. He is informed that due to Niki's confession, the charges against him are dropped, but his debt to Mr. Linderman remains undecided.

He and Micah later visit Niki in prison, where she tells him of her upcoming evaluation at the psychiatric ward and asserts that Jessica is not merely a dual personality. She then pleads with the guard to let her hug Micah; he refuses and eventually takes out his baton. Niki counters by snatching it and snapping it cleanly in half, displaying her super strength. Security personnel then overtake her.

Hiro and Ando finally make it to New York City, determining that they must find the sword used by "Future Hiro" in order to fully restore Hiro's abilities. The two locate the sword at the Museum of Natural History, and Hiro slows down time enough to steal it. However, he then discovers it to be a replica provided by Mr. Linderman.

The two later catch up with Isaac, Simone, and Nathan. Simone is convinced Isaac and Hiro both have powers.

Mohinder Suresh, at his apartment in New York, is visited by an FBI agent who states that they are finally taking his warnings seriously after all of Sylar's murders. He then reveals to Mohinder that Eden McCain, whose real name was Sarah Ellis, was found dead at Lake Ramsey in Sudbury, Ontario with an apparently self-inflicted gunshot wound to the head.

Mohinder is later visited by Mr. Bennet who tells him of Eden's abilities and her employment with him. He then asks for Mohinder's help, revealing that he needs Chandra Suresh's research. Mohinder refuses, but Mr. Bennet gives him a Primatech business card to contact him if he changes his mind.

Ted Sprague is seen practicing using his hands to generate small explosions.

Peter experiences another prophetic vision of himself exploding in New York City, this time featuring fleeting visions of an unnamed bearded man.

Peter wakes up screaming and leaves the hospital. He books a flight to the desert where nuclear tests were once conducted, and then sees the bearded man from his vision nonchalantly stealing from people he passes on the street.

When Peter pursues him, the man is stunned that Peter can see him despite his power of invisibility. Because Peter is around him, Peter absorbs his ability and becomes invisible as well. The bearded man attacks Peter.

At the very end of the episode, Niki is revealed to have been confined in a padded room in a psychiatric ward, bound in a straitjacket. Miserably, she asks God for help. As the lights switch off, Jessica says, "Who needs God when you've got me?"

== Production ==
=== Development ===
In January 2007, NBC announced that the twelfth episode of the season would be titled "Godsend". The episode was written by series creator Tim Kring, and directed by Paul Shapiro. This was Kring's fourth writing credit, and Shapiro's second directing credit.

== Reception ==
=== Viewers ===
In its original American broadcast, "Godsend" was seen by an estimated 14.90 million household viewers with a 5.3 in the 18–49 demographics. This means that 5.3 percent of all households with televisions watched the episode. It finished 9th out of 103 programs airing from January 22–28, 2007. This was a slight decrease in viewership from the previous episode, which was watched by an estimated 14.94 million household viewers with a 5.3 in the 18–49 demographics.

=== Critical reviews ===
"Godsend" received critical acclaim. Robert Canning of IGN gave the episode an "amazing" 9 out of 10 and wrote, "By far, the most exciting aspect of "Godsend" was coming away with the sense that things have been put in motion to stopping the prophesized destruction of New York City. The series introduced this event in its first two episodes, but has often felt like it was running in place instead of moving forward with this overarching story. It appears that preventing the massive explosion from occurring will again take center stage."

Alan Sepinwall wrote, "Now, they're coming back from a long break, so I don't have a problem with a show that only moves a couple of stories along more than incrementally. I'm just slightly more wary about believing this will wrap up interestingly."

Gilbert Cruz of Entertainment Weekly wrote, "Didn't you think the scene between H.R.G. and Mohinder was a little too reminiscent of a Darth Vader speech. Yes, H.R.G., and rule the galaxy as well). And am I the only one who thinks the closing narrations are getting more and more incomprehensible? I wrote this episode's down and listened to it twice. It still sounds like utter nonsense." Angel Cohn of TV Guide wrote, "I've never been much of a Niki supporter. I just thought that her story line never really fit, plus her power/curse whatever seems more annoying than cool. But tonight, Ali Larter really impressed me. I loved watching her flip back and forth between the devastated mother who just wants the freedom to be with her child and the vicious Jessica."

Michael Canfield of TV Squad wrote, "Hardly anything has gone the heroes' way during the hiatus. Sure, the Artist came out of his time in Odessa cured of heroin addiction, and is now able to paint without it, but most of the others are still suffering in the wake of previous events." Television Without Pity gave the episode an "A" grade.
