= Collision (Heroes) =

- Heroes episode
- Episode no.: Season 1 Episode 4
- Directed by: Ernest Dickerson
- Written by: Bryan Fuller
- Cinematography by: John Aronson
- Editing by: Michael S. Murphy
- Original release date: October 16, 2006
- Running time: 43 minutes

Guest appearances
- Jimmy Jean-Louis as The Haitian; Randell Bentley as Lyle Bennet; Deirdre Quinn as Tina; Thomas Dekker as Zach; Danielle Savre as Jackie Wilcox; Ashley Crow as Sandra Bennet; Matt Lanter as Brody Mitchum; Nora Zehetner as Eden McCain; James Kyson as Ando Masahashi; Jack Coleman as Noah Bennet

Episode chronology
← Previous "One Giant Leap"	Next → "Hiros"
- Heroes season 1

"Collision" is the fourth episode of the first season of the American superhero drama television series Heroes. The episode was written by consulting producer Bryan Fuller, and directed by Ernest Dickerson. It originally aired on NBC on October 16, 2006.

The series tells the stories of ordinary people who discover that they have superhuman abilities and how these abilities take effect in the characters' lives as they work together to prevent catastrophic futures. In the episode, Hiro and Ando arrive in Las Vegas, while Claire's father sets his sights on Matt. Meanwhile, Peter tries to find Isaac, and Niki is assigned to seduce a politician.

According to Nielsen Media Research, the episode was seen by an estimated 12.96 million household viewers and gained a 4.6 ratings share among adults aged 18–49. The episode received positive reviews from critics, who expressed intrigue with its cliffhanger.

== Plot ==
Mr. Bennet and the mysterious man observe and interrogate Matt Parkman. When Matt learns of Claire, the mysterious man is ordered to "clean him out".

Hiro and Ando arrive in Las Vegas. There, Niki Sanders and her son Micah meet Mr. Linderman's associates, who order her to seduce a politician Linderman is involved with, for blackmail.

Claire Bennet's body lies on the autopsy table as the coroner goes over case notes. She revives during the process, while the coroner is distracted, and sneaks out. At home, she weeps, recollecting her experience, while her father remains unaware.

Nathan Petrelli is approached by Mohinder Suresh who warns him his life is in danger. Nathan realizes Mohinder is connected to the book Peter showed him.

Eden drops by Mohinder's apartment, giving him his father's ashes. As Mohinder plans to return to Chennai, Peter shows up, revealing he has powers.

Simone and Peter spend the night together. Nathan arrives and accuses Peter of sending "Dr. Suresh" to him, which Peter denies. Simone leaves to talk to Isaac, wishing to buy his latest paintings. Isaac refuses, and proclaims he knows about her and Peter, having drawn a picture of them seven weeks prior. He asks for an advance to buy heroin, which he believes will enable him to stop a nuclear explosion that will destroy New York City.

Peter learns more about his powers while talking to Mohinder, and concludes he has some sort of empathic ability. The two go to Isaac's apartment to investigate his ability, but cannot enter, as he, in a drug-induced trance, dreams of Claire again.

At school, Zach confronts Claire over the previous night. Claire wants to ignore it, knowing she can't press charges against Brody as she has no proof. Claire's classmate Lori Tremmel reveals that Brody assaulted her too.

At the casino, Hiro uses his time powers to cheat and gain money, as Ando gets carried away in his gambling. Eventually, he and Ando are thrown out by security, and attacked by a group they had cheated, who knock Hiro out.

In the same casino, Niki finally meets with the politician: Nathan Petrelli. After bonding with Nathan and receiving a threat from Linderman's goons, she switches to the Jessica personality and seduces Nathan, with the encounter recorded.

As Isaac exits his drug-induced trance, he sees he painted an incomplete picture depicting Claire fleeing from a shadowy figure.

Claire tricks Brody into letting her drive his car, and, after confronting him about the previous night, drives it into a brick wall at top speed.

While Niki and Nathan are sleeping, Mr. Bennet and the mysterious man arrive to take one of them, not explicitly stated which.

Returning home on a subway with Mohinder, after failing to contact Isaac, Peter sees time stop. A very different looking Hiro appears, claiming to be from the future, with a message for Peter.

== Production ==
=== Development ===
In October 2006, NBC announced that the fourth episode of the season would be titled "Collision". The episode was written by consulting producer Bryan Fuller, and directed by Ernest Dickerson. This was Fuller's first writing credit, and Dickerson's first directing credit. Originally, the episode was titled "Come Together".

== Reception ==
=== Viewers ===
In its original American broadcast, "Collision" was seen by an estimated 12.96 million household viewers with a 4.6 in the 18–49 demographics. This means that 4.6 percent of all households with televisions watched the episode. It finished 24th out of 92 programs airing from October 9–15, 2007. This was a slight decrease in viewership from the previous episode, which was watched by an estimated 13.34 million household viewers with a 4.7 in the 18–49 demographics.

=== Critical reviews ===
"Collision" received positive reviews from critics. Robert Canning of IGN gave the episode a "good" 7.8 out of 10 and wrote, "as exciting as the ending was, the 55 minutes leading up to it were hit and miss. The hour opened with Matt Parkman strapped to a bed, surrounded by monitoring equipment, having a conversation with The Man in Glasses. But after some experiment is alluded to, we don't see Matt again for the rest of the show. This was distracting. As each act came to a close, you're left to wonder when Matt's storyline would return and question how it might be related to the rest of the episode. It gave the impression the writers were trying to squeeze the character in when it simply wasn't necessary."

Alan Sepinwall wrote, "Well, after three weeks of moving the plot incrementally before unleashing a great cliffhanger, Heroes gives us an entire hour of story - or, close to it, since Marian needed the defibrillator paddles to rouse me after the Peter and Simone scene. We get a closer look at Claire's dad and his eeeeevil sidekick, witness Niki's mirror personality in action for the first time, get a more concrete description of what Peter's ability is, and put more characters in rooms together. The Peter/Mohinder two-in-one team-up was especially good, because Mohinder's skepticism lent a comic note to the show's mopiest character. All that, and a Rain Man homage and the appearance of a staff-wielding, soul patch-sporting, fluent English-speaking Future Hiro as an even better cliffhanger than Claire's autopsy last week." Angel Cohn of TV Guide wrote, "Hiro was sweet and seemingly innocent of why he got punched in the face. So I'll concentrate on the here and now and worry about the future when it happens, or when Hiro lands in my living room."

Michael Canfield of TV Squad wrote, "Hiro and Ando have the most fun, and funniest adventures. I'm happy Ando is still along for the ride, the pair works well together. I love the look on Hiro's face right before he restarts time at the roulette wheel. And even when stopping time to cheat the roulette wheel, he takes a moment to upright a spilling drink on a cocktail waitress's tray. Why not have a little fun while you're in Vegas?" Television Without Pity gave the episode a "B+" grade.
