= Malcolm Stoddard =

British actor (born 1948)

- Born: Malcolm C. Stoddard; 20 July 1948 (age 77); Epsom, Surrey, England

Malcolm Stoddard (born 20 July 1948) is a British actor who has appeared in films and television.

== Early life ==
He attended the all-male grammar school Chichester High School For Boys.

== Career ==
His TV credits include The Voyage of Charles Darwin, Colditz, The Brothers, The New Avengers, Jennie: Lady Randolph Churchill (1974), Blake's 7, The Treachery Game, Oxbridge Blues (1984), Rain on the Roof, The Assassination Run, Squadron, By the Sword Divided, Juliet Bravo, Boon, The Bill, Families, Emmerdale, The Campbells, Heartbeat and Road to Avonlea.

His films include Cari Genitori (1973), Luther (1974), S.O.S. Titanic (1979), The Godsend (1980), Tree of Hands (1989), Innocent Victim (1989), Gulliver's Travels (1996), Treasure Island (1999) and Dil Jo Bhi Kahey... (2005).

== Filmography ==
=== Film ===
Year	Title	Role	Notes
1973	Cari Genitori	Joe	
1974	Luther	King Charles	
1980	The Godsend	Alan Marlowe	
1989	Innocent Victim	Ian Raeburn	
1999	Treasure Island	Capt. Smollet	
2005	Dil Jo Bhi Kahey...	Norman Besson	

=== Television ===
Year	Title	Role	Notes
1972	ITV Sunday Night Theatre	Mike	Episode: "Major Lavender"
1972 & 1975	Play of the Month	Gratiano, Underwood	Episodes: "The Merchant of Venice", "Strife"
1973	A Picture of Katherine Mansfield	Dick	Episode: "1.3"
1974	The Brothers	Johnny Trent	Main role
1974	Colditz	Christopher Mason	Episodes: "Senior American Officer", "Very Important Person", "Liberation"
1974	Jennie: Lady Rudolph Churchill	Jack Churchill	TV miniseries
1976	The Glittering Prizes	Dan Bradley	TV miniseries
1976	Forget Me Not	Danny McCann	Episode: "The Runner"
1976	The New Avengers	George Myers	Episode: "Target!"
1977	Jubilee	Phil Clemence	Episode: "An Hour in the Life..."
1978	The Voyage of Charles Darwin	Charles Darwin	TV miniseries
1979	S.O.S. Titanic	Charles H. Lightoller	TV film
1979–1980	Heartland	Ray Boston	Episodes: "Big Deal", "Family"
1980	The Assassination Run	Mark Fraser	Episodes: "1.1", "1.2", "1.3"
1980	Rain on the Roof	John	TV film
1981	The Treachery Game	Mark Fraser	Episodes: "1.1", "1.2", "1.3"
1981	Blake's 7	Leitz	Episode: "Traitor"
1982	Little Miss Perkins	Geoffrey Fitch	TV film
1982	Squadron	Peter Tyson	Main role
1983	Jemima Shore Investigates	Ian Waring	Episode: "A Promising Death"
1983	By the Sword Divided	Hannibal Marsh	Regular role (series 1)
1984	Oxbridge Blues	Philip Geary, Crispin, Michael	Episodes: "Oxbridge Blues", "That Was Tory", "Similar Triangles"
1985	Juliet Bravo	Alan Garwood	Episode: "Turbulence"
1986	The Pyrates	Thomas Blood	TV film
1986–1990	The Campbells	James Campbell	Main role
1989	Bordertown	Theodore Palliser	Episode: "Vigilante"
1989	Boon	David Rennet	Episode: "Don't Buy from Me, Argentina"
1990	Road to Avonlea	Malcolm McEwan	Episodes: "Aunt Abigail's Beau" & "Malcolm and the Baby"
1990–1991	Families	Mike Thompson	Main role
1991	Cluedo	Simon Charles	Episode: "A Deadly Deal"
1991	Thatcher: The Final Days	Tim Bell	TV film
1993	Harry	Malcolm Laird	Episode: "1.11"
1994	The Saint: The Software Murders	River	TV film
1996	The Girl	Matthew Thornton	TV film
1997	The Bill	Robert Hawley	Episode: "The Old Pal's Act"
1998	Coming Home	Bob Somerville	TV miniseries
1998	Animal Ark	Julian Hardy	Episode: "Bunnies in the Bathroom"
1998	Emmerdale	Michael Thornfield	Episodes: "1.2409", "1.2412", "1.2415"
1999	Bernard's Watch	Mr. Phelps	Episode: "Tee Time"
2001	Doctors	Peter Davies	Episode: "No Smoke Without Fire"
2003	Heartbeat	James Robson	Episode: "Moving Target"
2004	The Courtroom	Tony Markham	Recurring role
2007	Midsomer Murders	Richard Carnack	Episode: "The Animal Within"
