= Hiros =

- Heroes episode
- Episode no.: Season 1 Episode 5
- Directed by: Paul Shapiro
- Written by: Michael Green
- Cinematography by: John Aronson
- Editing by: Donn Aron
- Original release date: October 23, 2006
- Running time: 43 minutes

Guest appearances
- Deirdre Quinn as Tina; Jimmy Jean-Louis as The Haitian; Matt Lanter as Brody Mitchum; Lisa Lackey as Janice Parkman; James Kyson as Ando Masahashi; Jack Coleman as Noah Bennet; Danielle Savre as Jackie Wilcox; Ashley Crow as Sandra Bennet

Episode chronology
← Previous "Collision"	Next → "Better Halves"
- Heroes season 1

"Hiros" is the fifth episode of the first season of the American superhero drama television series Heroes. The episode was written by co-executive producer Michael Green, and directed by Paul Shapiro. It originally aired on NBC on October 23, 2006.

The series tells the stories of ordinary people who discover that they have superhuman abilities and how these abilities take effect in the characters' lives as they work together to prevent catastrophic futures. In the episode, Peter receives a message from a future version of Hiro, while Claire comes clean to her father over her night with Brody.

According to Nielsen Media Research, the episode was seen by an estimated 14.45 million household viewers and gained a 5.1 ratings share among adults aged 18–49. The episode received mixed reviews from critics; while there was praise for the performances, some criticized its lack of plot progress.

== Plot ==
=== Claire ===
Claire and Brody have survived their crash and are seen in the hospital. Claire finally tells her father that Brody had attempted to rape her, but makes him promise not to tell the authorities. Although Mr. Bennet promises he won't tell anyone, he later visits Brody's room with the mystery man. Brody threatens to sue Claire's father, though Mr. Bennet tells a weakened Brody that he will give him one more chance to straighten up his act. Although Brody refuses, the mystery man manages to erase Brody's entire memory. Claire later visits him, and finds out he doesn't know who she is, or even his own name.

=== Matt ===
Janice Parkman is worried sick about her missing husband, but worry turns to anger when she discovers him waking up on their couch. As Matt wakes up on his own couch, he recalls working with the FBI, but doesn't know where he's been for the past day. Reading her thoughts, Matt is surprised to learn how much Janice still worries and cares for him, even though they hardly speak anymore. Matt, reading his wife's mind, manages to learn her desires and her idea of a real dream date. He begins to act upon her wishes - even little ones, like going to buy her favourite coffee ice cream. Matt heads out for ice cream. Upon reaching the store, Matt learns there is a robber planning to shoot up the store. Matt manages to convince the robber to stop, but the customers in the store assume he is the robber and a tirade of thoughts begin to press Matt's mind. He ends up passing out.

=== Hiro, Nathan ===
The poker players beat up Ando and Hiro, and toss them at a desert diner. The two argue about Hiro's lack of help (even though he has powers) and Ando's Internet stripper. Ando finally storms out.

In Las Vegas, Mr. Bennet and the mystery man walk Nathan Petrelli from the hotel at gunpoint. Nathan uses his power of flight and manages to fly away. Nathan lands at the desert diner where Hiro is at and befriends him. Hiro tells of what he knows, about New York and how they each have powers. Nathan is not sure what to believe, but agrees to give Hiro a ride back to Las Vegas. Once reaching Vegas, the two break apart and Nathan speaks with Mr. Linderman's representative about the tape of his encounter with Niki. Nathan turns the situation around by asking for a doubling of Linderman's campaign contribution. If Linderman was so important to go through all this trouble for two million, then four million will guarantee his victory, making him even more valuable in the future.

=== Niki ===
Niki wakes up in the morning in Nathan's hotel room with no idea of how she got there. Mr. Linderman's representative informs Niki that since she slept with Nathan, she is no longer in debt. Niki, confused, sees the footage tape of her having sex with Nathan. A perplexed Niki returns home to find the police on her doorstep. Before they could inform her of what happened, Ando appears, causing a massive scare, as the cops had mistaken him for Niki's fugitive husband D.L. Hawkins. Ando had recognized Niki as his Internet stripper, and had followed her home. Niki does not help him, saying she wants to keep her business and personal life separate. It is at this point where D.L. shows up for real.

=== Peter, Isaac ===
With time apparently stopped, Peter encounters a future Hiro on a New York City Subway train. Hiro informs Peter he is from the future and that Isaac and his paintings will help save the city. Hiro ends off saying "save the cheerleader, save the world," and disappears. After this encounter, Peter is unable to convince the skeptical Mohinder to return to Isaac's apartment. Mohinder decides to retire from his research and head home.

In New York City, Peter arrives at Isaac's. Isaac asks Peter what he wants now after already having taken Simone away from him. Peter tells Isaac about his path and that Isaac was supposed to know the way. Peter realizes Isaac's paintings are a story, with the last being a final incomplete picture depicting a shadowy figure and the cheerleader. As Isaac doesn't have heroin -and therefore, no access to his powers to paint the future- Peter uses his ability of power mimicry and syncs to Isaac's power, in an attempt to discover who the shadowy figure is. Once Peter has finished, it's revealed the painting depicts a gruesome image of Claire lying splayed out in a sea of her own blood, the top of her head missing, just like the other murder victims in previous episodes. The phone rings, with Peter realizing it is Hiro and answers. "My name's Peter Petrelli," he says, "I have a message for you."

== Production ==
=== Development ===
In October 2006, NBC announced that the fifth episode of the season would be titled "Hiros". The episode was written by co-executive producer Michael Green, and directed by Paul Shapiro. This was Green's first writing credit, and Shapiro's first directing credit.

== Reception ==
=== Viewers ===
In its original American broadcast, "Hiros" was seen by an estimated 14.45 million household viewers with a 5.1 in the 18–49 demographics. This means that 5.1 percent of all households with televisions watched the episode. It finished 17th out of 104 programs airing from October 23–29, 2007. This was a 11% increase in viewership from the previous episode, which was watched by an estimated 12.96 million household viewers with a 4.6 in the 18–49 demographics.

=== Critical reviews ===
"Hiros" received mixed reviews from critics. Robert Canning of IGN gave the episode a "mediocre" 5.5 out of 10 and wrote, "Nothing major really occurred to help the overarching storyline move forward. Having hooked its audience with a spectacular cliffhanger a week ago, Heroes lost an opportunity to build on its momentum with this lackluster episode."

Alan Sepinwall wrote, "The first Heroes without an OMFG cliffhanger, but the circularity of Peter passing Future Hiro's message back to present Hiro was cool enough to compensate. The characters continue to come together nicely, whether it's Hiro's fanboy encounter with Nathan at the diner (and for series TV, the effects on Nathan's supersonic flight were pretty nifty) or Ando showing up at Niki's doorstep. I even don't mind her and Peter anymore, so they're doing something right." Angel Cohn of TV Guide wrote, "I enjoy this show, I really, really do, but sometimes I get too involved in wondering about the small details and that sort of ruins it for me. Tonight's big quibble was with Hiro."

Michael Canfield of TV Squad wrote, "Not quite the mind-blowing climax of last week's episode, but I loved that Peter was there to relay future-Hiro's message when present-Hiro and Ando try the artist's number again. That must have blown Hiro's mind anyway." Television Without Pity gave the episode an "A" grade.
