= Thomas Owen (writer) =

Belgian writer (1910–2002)

- Born: 22 July 1910; Leuven, Belgium
- Died: 2 March 2002 (aged 91); Brussels, Belgium
- Occupation: Writer
- Writing career
- Language: French
- Genres: Weird; Fantasy; Fantastique
- Movement: Belgium Weird

Thomas Owen (real name Gérald Bertot) is often credited with Jean Ray and Franz Hellens as a pillar of Belgium weird fiction and as part of the golden age of Belgium fantastique fiction. He wrote over 300 short stories in his lifetime, most being either fantasy or weird fiction.

== Biography ==
Thomas Owen started as an author of detective fiction but switched to the fantastique with 1942's l’Initiation à la Peur. Eventually he became close friends with one of the founders of the Belgian school of the strange, Jean Ray. They remained close friends until Ray's death in 1964.
