= List of Billboard number-one dance songs of 2018 =

Billboard magazine compiled the top-performing dance songs in the United States during 2018 on the Hot Dance/Electronic Songs, the Dance Club Songs, and the Dance/Mix Show Airplay. The oldest dance music chart, the Dance Club Songs was first published in 1976, ranking the most popular songs on dance club based on reports from a national sample of club DJs. The Dance/Mix Show Airplay was launched in 2003, ranking songs based on airplay detections on dance radio, as well as mix-show plays on top 40 radio and select rhythmic radio as measured by Mediabase. Premiered on January 26, 2013, the Hot Dance/Electronic Songs is a multi-metric chart ranking songs based on streaming, sales, and airplay audience impressions from radio stations of all formats.

== Chart history ==
Key
†	Indicates top-performing dance song of 2018.

Chart history
Issue date	Hot Dance/Electronic Songs			Dance Club Songs			Dance/Mix Show Airplay		
Issue date	Song	Artist(s)	Ref.	Song	Artist(s)	Ref.	Song	Artist(s)	Ref.
January 3	"Wolves"	Selena Gomez and Marshmello		"Shine Your Love"	Scotty Boy and Lizzie Curious		"Bad at Love"	Halsey	
January 6	"Wolves"	Selena Gomez and Marshmello		"X With U"	Tom Budin and Luciana		"Havana"	Camila Cabello featuring Young Thug	
January 13	"Wolves"	Selena Gomez and Marshmello		"Think (About It)"	Barbara Tucker		"Havana"	Camila Cabello featuring Young Thug	
January 20	"Wolves"	Selena Gomez and Marshmello		"Ain't No Mountain High Enough (2017)"	Diana Ross		"Best Friend"	Sofi Tukker featuring Nervo, The Knocks and Alisa Ueno	
January 27	"Wolves"	Selena Gomez and Marshmello		"Stars"	Kristine W		"Best Friend"	Sofi Tukker featuring Nervo, The Knocks and Alisa Ueno	
February 3	"Wolves"	Selena Gomez and Marshmello		"Too Much to Ask"	Niall Horan		"New Rules"	Dua Lipa	
February 10	"The Middle" ‡	Zedd, Maren Morris and Grey		"Coping"	Toni Braxton		"New Rules"	Dua Lipa	
February 17	"The Middle" ‡	Zedd, Maren Morris and Grey		"Meet in the Middle"	StoneBridge featuring Haley Joelle		"New Rules"	Dua Lipa	
February 24	"The Middle" ‡	Zedd, Maren Morris and Grey		"Consideration"	Rihanna featuring SZA		"New Rules"	Dua Lipa	
March 3	"The Middle" ‡	Zedd, Maren Morris and Grey		"All Falls Down"	Alan Walker featuring Noah Cyrus and Digital Farm Animals		"The Middle"†	Zedd, Maren Morris and Grey	
March 10	"The Middle" ‡	Zedd, Maren Morris and Grey		"Finesse" (Remix)	Bruno Mars featuring Cardi B		"The Middle"†	Zedd, Maren Morris and Grey	
March 17	"The Middle" ‡	Zedd, Maren Morris and Grey		"Generous"	Olivia Holt		"The Middle"†	Zedd, Maren Morris and Grey	
March 24	"The Middle" ‡	Zedd, Maren Morris and Grey		"Blame"	Skylar Stecker		"The Middle"†	Zedd, Maren Morris and Grey	
March 31	"The Middle" ‡	Zedd, Maren Morris and Grey		"Beautiful Trauma"	Pink		"The Middle"†	Zedd, Maren Morris and Grey	
April 7	"The Middle" ‡	Zedd, Maren Morris and Grey		"You're Good for Me"	Tony Moran featuring Kimberly Davis		"The Middle"†	Zedd, Maren Morris and Grey	
April 14	"The Middle" ‡	Zedd, Maren Morris and Grey		"Crazy Enough"	Joe Bermudez featuring Louise Carver		"The Middle"†	Zedd, Maren Morris and Grey	
April 21	"The Middle" ‡	Zedd, Maren Morris and Grey		"I Am House"	Crystal Waters, Sted-E and Hybrid Heights		"Friends"	Marshmello and Anne-Marie	
April 28	"The Middle" ‡	Zedd, Maren Morris and Grey		"IDGAF"	Dua Lipa		"The Middle" †	Zedd, Maren Morris and Grey	
May 5	"The Middle" ‡	Zedd, Maren Morris and Grey		“Lost”	Vassy & Afrojack featuring Oliver Rosa		"The Middle" †	Zedd, Maren Morris and Grey	
May 12	"The Middle" ‡	Zedd, Maren Morris and Grey		“Dancing”	Kylie Minogue		"The Middle" †	Zedd, Maren Morris and Grey	
May 19	"The Middle" ‡	Zedd, Maren Morris and Grey		“Magenta Riddim”	DJ Snake		"The Middle" †	Zedd, Maren Morris and Grey	
May 26	"The Middle" ‡	Zedd, Maren Morris and Grey		“My My My!”	Troye Sivan		"Friends"	Marshmello and Anne-Marie	
June 2	"The Middle" ‡	Zedd, Maren Morris and Grey		"One Kiss" †	Calvin Harris and Dua Lipa		"One Kiss"	Calvin Harris featuring Dua Lipa	
June 9	"The Middle" ‡	Zedd, Maren Morris and Grey		"Euphoria"	The Perry Twins featuring Harper Starling		"One Kiss"	Calvin Harris featuring Dua Lipa	
June 16	"The Middle" ‡	Zedd, Maren Morris and Grey		"Wavey"	Cliq featuring Alika		"One Kiss"	Calvin Harris featuring Dua Lipa	
June 23	"The Middle" ‡	Zedd, Maren Morris and Grey		"No Tears Left to Cry"	Ariana Grande		"One Kiss"	Calvin Harris featuring Dua Lipa	
June 30	"The Middle" ‡	Zedd, Maren Morris and Grey		"Hot Stuff 2018"	Donna Summer		"One Kiss"	Calvin Harris featuring Dua Lipa	
July 7	"The Middle" ‡	Zedd, Maren Morris and Grey		"Alone"	Halsey featuring Big Sean & Stefflon Don		"One Kiss"	Calvin Harris featuring Dua Lipa	
July 14	"The Middle" ‡	Zedd, Maren Morris and Grey		"Alien"	Sabrina Carpenter & Jonas Blue		"Friends"	Marshmello and Anne-Marie	
July 21	"The Middle" ‡	Zedd, Maren Morris and Grey		"Ashes"	Celine Dion		"One Kiss"	Calvin Harris featuring Dua Lipa	
July 28	"The Middle" ‡	Zedd, Maren Morris and Grey		"Love Is Bigger Than Anything in Its Way"	U2		"One Kiss"	Calvin Harris featuring Dua Lipa	
August 4	"The Middle" ‡	Zedd, Maren Morris and Grey		"I'm Coming Out / Upside Down 2018"	Diana Ross		"Friends"	Marshmello and Anne-Marie	
August 11	"The Middle" ‡	Zedd, Maren Morris and Grey		"Hold On Tight"	R3hab and Conor Maynard		"Friends"	Marshmello and Anne-Marie	
August 18	"The Middle" ‡	Zedd, Maren Morris and Grey		"I'm In Love With You"	Tony Moran featuring Jason Walker		"One Kiss"	Calvin Harris featuring Dua Lipa	
August 25	"The Middle" ‡	Zedd, Maren Morris and Grey		"Toy"	Netta		"One Kiss"	Calvin Harris featuring Dua Lipa	
September 1	"The Middle" ‡	Zedd, Maren Morris and Grey		"Accelerate"	Christina Aguilera featuring Ty Dolla Sign and 2 Chainz		"I Like It"	Cardi B, Bad Bunny and J Balvin	
September 8	"The Middle" ‡	Zedd, Maren Morris and Grey		"Sticks & Stones"	Metro & Nelly Furtado		"Jackie Chan"	Tiesto, Dzeko, Preme and Post Malone	
September 15	"The Middle" ‡	Zedd, Maren Morris and Grey		"Rise"	Jonas Blue featuring Jack & Jack		"Jackie Chan"	Tiesto, Dzeko, Preme and Post Malone	
September 22	"The Middle" ‡	Zedd, Maren Morris and Grey		"Stand Up"	Dirty Werk (Steve Smooth and DJ Bam Bam)		"Side Effects"	The Chainsmokers featuring Emily Warren	
September 29	"Happier"	Marshmello and Bastille		"Remind Me to Forget"	Kygo featuring Miguel		"Side Effects"	The Chainsmokers featuring Emily Warren	
October 6	"Happier"	Marshmello and Bastille		"Doomsday"	Vassy and Lodato		"Promises"	Calvin Harris and Sam Smith	
October 13	"Happier"	Marshmello and Bastille		"God Is a Woman"	Ariana Grande		"Promises"	Calvin Harris and Sam Smith	
October 20	"Happier"	Marshmello and Bastille		"Made for Now"	Janet and Daddy Yankee		"Happier"	Marshmello and Bastille	
October 27	"Happier"	Marshmello and Bastille		"Promises"	Calvin Harris and Sam Smith		"Happier"	Marshmello and Bastille	
November 3	"Happier"	Marshmello and Bastille		"Almost Love"	Sabrina Carpenter		"Happier"	Marshmello and Bastille	
November 10	"Happier"	Marshmello and Bastille		"Low"	Lenny Kravitz		"Happier"	Marshmello and Bastille	
November 17	"Happier"	Marshmello and Bastille		"Happier"	Marshmello and Bastille		"Happier"	Marshmello and Bastille	
November 24	"Happier"	Marshmello and Bastille		"Electricity"	Silk City and Dua Lipa		"Happier"	Marshmello and Bastille	
December 1	"Happier"	Marshmello and Bastille		"(It Happens) Sometimes"	Jack Back		"Happier"	Marshmello and Bastille	
December 8	"Happier"	Marshmello and Bastille		"Breathin"	Ariana Grande		"Happier"	Marshmello and Bastille	
December 15	"Happier"	Marshmello and Bastille		"Shallow"	Lady Gaga and Bradley Cooper		"Happier"	Marshmello and Bastille	
December 22	"Happier"	Marshmello and Bastille		"Losing It"	Fisher		"Happier"	Marshmello and Bastille	
December 29	"Happier"	Marshmello and Bastille		"Secrets"	Pink		"Happier"	Marshmello and Bastille	
