= Luciana discography =

This is the discography for British singer Luciana.

== Albums ==
- 1994: One More River
- 2008: Featuring Luciana

== Singles ==
=== As lead artist ===
Year	Title	Chart positions		
Year	Title	UK	US Dance	AUS
1994	"Get It Up for Love"	55	—	—
1994	"If You Want"	47	—	—
1994	"What Goes Around"^{[A]}	67	—	—
1994	"One More River"^{[A]}	67	—	—
2011	"I'm Still Hot"	—	1	42
2013	"U B the Bass"	—	6	88
2016	"Rebound to the Beat" (with Promise Land)	—	––	––
2016	"Gorilla" (with Will Sparks, Tyron Hapi)	—	––	––
2017	"Yeah Yeah 2017" (with Dave Audé)^{[B]}	—	1	––
2018	"Flakka Flakka" (with Will Sparks and Dave Audé)	—	––	––
2020	"5 Minutes" (with Will Sparks)	—	––	––
2021	"The Bender" (with Joel Fletcher and Savage)	—	––	––
"—" denotes a recording that did not chart or was not released.

Notes

- A "What Goes Around" was released as a double A-side with "One More River".
- B Remake of "Yeah Yeah" by Bodyrox feat. Luciana.

=== Other songs ===
Year	Single
2011	"USA Let's Go!"

=== with Bodyrox ===
Year	Title	Chart positions							
Year	Title	UK	AUS	NLD	IRL	FIN	BEL	NZ	US Dance
2006	"Yeah Yeah" (Bodyrox featuring Luciana)	2	39	13	43	7	30	51	3
2008	"What Planet You On?" (Bodyrox featuring Luciana)	54	55	55	—	—	65	—	17
2008	"Brave New World" (Bodyrox featuring Luciana and Nick Clow)	—	—	—	—	—	—	—	—
2009	"Shut Your Mouth" (Bodyrox featuring Luciana)	—	—	—	—	—	—	—	—
2010	"Throw the Paint" (Bodyrox and Luciana)	—	—	—	—	—	—	—	—
2012	"Bow Wow Wow" (Bodyrox and Luciana featuring Chipmunk)	—	—	—	—	—	—	—	—

=== As featured artist ===
Year	Title	Chart positions				
Year	Title	UK	AUS	BEL	NZ	US Dance
1998	"I Don't Know If I Should Call You Baby" (Definitive featuring Luciana)	—	—	—	—	—
2007	"Bigger Than Big" (Super Mal featuring Luciana)	19	31	—	—	24
2007	"I Wish U Would" (Martijn ten Velden featuring Luciana)	—	—	—	—	—
2007	"Party Animal" (Mark Knight featuring Luciana)	—	—	—	—	—
2008	"Come On Girl" (Taio Cruz featuring Luciana)	5	—	—	—	—
2009	"I Like That" (Richard Vission and Static Revenger starring Luciana)	—	3	—	19	1
2010	"Electric Dreams" (Fedde Le Grand featuring Luciana)	—	—	89	—	—
2010	"Make Boys Cry" (David Vendetta featuring Luciana)	—	—	—	—	—
2010	"Go Go Go!" (Lethal Bizzle and Nick Bridges featuring Luciana)	—	63	—	—	—
2010	"Skin I'm In" (Static Revenger and Luciana)	—	84	—	—	44
2010	"I Got My Eye on You" (with Nari & Milani and Cristian Marchi)	—	33	—	—	—
2011	"Say I'm Gonna Be Your Boy" (Criminal Vibes featuring Luciana)	—	—	—	—	—
2011	"Jump" (with The Cube Guys)	—	—	—	—	—
2012	"We Own the Night" (Tiësto and Wolfgang Gartner featuring Luciana)	87	—	—	—	—
2012	"When It Feels This Good" (Richard Vission vs. Luciana)	—	91	—	—	4
2012	"Something for the Weekend" (Dave Audé featuring Luciana)	—	—	—	—	1
2013	"The New Kings" (Popeska featuring Luciana)	—	—	—	—	—
2013	"Big Dipper" (The Cataracs featuring Luciana)	—	—	—	—	—
2013	"Guess What?" (with Cazwell)	—	—	—	—	14
2013	"Electricity & Drums (Bad Boy)" (Dave Audé featuring Akon and Luciana)	—	—	—	—	1
2014	"Hashtag" (Dave Audé featuring Luciana)	—	—	—	—	—
2014	"We Got It All" (John Dahlbäck featuring Luciana)	—	—	—	—	—
2014	"Arcadia" (Hardwell and Joey Dale featuring Luciana)	—	—	—	—	—
2014	"No Heroes" (Firebeatz and KSHMR featuring Luciana)	—	—	—	—	—
2014	"We Came to Bang" (3lau featuring Luciana)	—	—	—	—	—
2014	"Night Shine" (Excision and The Frim featuring Luciana)	—	—	—	—	—
2014	"Feel the Release" (CID featuring Luciana)	—	—	—	—	—
2015	"Sick Like That" (Will Sparks featuring Luciana)	—	97	—	—	—
2015	"Everybody Stand Up" (Bombs Away featuring Luciana)	—	—	—	—	—
2016	"Skin on Skin" (Cedric Gervais featuring Luciana)	—	—	—	—	—
2016	"Fireflies" (Bassjackers featuring Luciana)	—	—	—	—	—
2016	"Gold" (Max Styler and Devault featuring Luciana)	—	—	—	—	—
2017	"X With U" (with Tom Budin)	—	—	—	—	1
2019	"Lies" (Kshmr and B3rror)	—	—	—	—	—
2019	"Like Fire" (Ben Nicky and Mashd N Kutcher)	—	—	—	—	—
2023	"Drop Da Bomb" (with Bombs Away)	—	—	—	—	—
2023	"ACID" (Hardwell & Maddix feat. Luciana)	—	—	—	—	—
"—" denotes a recording that did not chart or was not released.
