= Get Him to the Greek =

2010 American comedy film by Nicholas Stoller

- Theatrical release poster
- Directed by: Nicholas Stoller
- Written by: Nicholas Stoller
- Based on: Characters by Jason Segel
- Produced by: Judd Apatow; Nicholas Stoller; David Bushell; Rodney Rothman
- Starring: Jonah Hill; Russell Brand; Elisabeth Moss; Rose Byrne; Colm Meaney; Sean Combs
- Cinematography: Robert Yeoman
- Edited by: William Kerr; Michael Sale
- Music by: Lyle Workman
- Production companies: Apatow Productions; Relativity Media; Spyglass Entertainment
- Distributed by: Universal Pictures
- Release date: June 4, 2010
- Running time: 109 minutes
- Country: United States
- Language: English
- Budget: $40 million
- Box office: $95.5 million

Get Him to the Greek is a 2010 American comedy film written, co-produced, and directed by Nicholas Stoller. It serves as a spin-off to Forgetting Sarah Marshall (2008), and reunites director Stoller with Russell Brand and Jonah Hill and producer Judd Apatow. Brand reprises his role as character Aldous Snow while Hill plays an entirely new character, Aaron Green, with Elisabeth Moss, Rose Byrne, Sean Combs, and Colm Meaney also starring. The film was released on June 4, 2010, received generally positive reviews from critics, and grossed $95 million against its $40 million budget.

== Plot ==
In 2009, British rock star Aldous Snow releases his new album featuring the title single, "African Child", which is a commercial and critical failure. In an interview, his girlfriend, pop star Jackie Q, drunkenly declares they have a boring life. Aldous then relapses, ending their relationship and losing custody of his son, Naples.

Meanwhile, in Los Angeles, Aaron Green is a talent scout at Pinnacle Records, living with his girlfriend Daphne, who is completing a medical residency at a local hospital. Pinnacle is strapped for cash after several poor business decisions, and the head of the company, Sergio Roma, asks for ideas. Aaron suggests Aldous play at the Greek Theatre on the tenth anniversary of a performance there in 1999.

Sergio sends Aaron to London to escort Aldous to Los Angeles. Daphne informs Aaron that she has received a residency job offer in Seattle and that they are moving there. They argue and seemingly break up. Aaron meets Aldous and learns that he had not been expecting him, thinking that the concert was not for two more months. They barhop across the city as Aaron tries to get Aldous to catch a flight to New York City.

Aaron and Aldous go to New York City for Aldous's appearance on Today. To keep him sober, Aaron imbibes all of Aldous's alcohol and drugs. While performing live, Aldous is unable to remember the lyrics to "African Child", and replaces it with an old hit, "The Clap", to cheers from the audience. Daphne calls Aaron to apologize, only to learn that he believes they broke up. While partying, Aaron's phone accidentally calls Daphne, informing her of his drunken activities.

On their flight to Los Angeles, Aaron learns that Aldous has become depressed, as he misses his son and has been alienated from his own father, Jonathan, for years. Aaron suggests he visit him after the show; instead, Aldous insists they go to Las Vegas to see Jonathan. Sergio, having been keeping tabs on the two, arrives to take control of the situation. Meanwhile, Aldous and Jonathan argue over Jonathan's seeming disinterest in his son outside of his career and his mockery of Aldous's mother. Sergio hooks Aaron up with a sexually violent girl, Destiny, who takes him to a hotel room and rapes him. After Aaron tells Aldous that he has been raped, Aldous gives him a laced marijuana joint to calm him down. He has a bad trip, causing a fight that inadvertently sets the hotel lounge on fire.

Believing he is having a heart attack, Aldous manages to stabilize Aaron by giving him an adrenaline shot. They flee a drugged-up Sergio to reach Los Angeles, where Aaron convinces Aldous to visit Jackie Q. She has been sleeping with Lars Ulrich and confesses that Naples is not actually Aldous’ biological son. Meanwhile, Aaron goes to his own home to apologize to Daphne. They are interrupted when Aldous arrives, proposing a threesome. Daphne agrees and Aaron hesitantly goes along.

Aaron angrily decides to kiss Aldous, ending the tryst. Daphne and Aaron both immediately regret it, and Aaron angrily tells Aldous to go, criticizing his mental state. Instead of preparing for his show, he goes to the rooftop of the Standard Hotel, and calls Aaron, threatening to jump. Aaron rushes to the hotel and attempts to talk him down.

Aaron arrives, in time to stop Aldous from jumping. Nevertheless, Aldous jumps into a pool several floors down, breaking his arm. Aldous tells him that he is lonely, sad, and embarrassed, but is reminded that thousands of fans love him and are waiting to see him. Aldous decides to perform at the Greek Theatre, although Aaron pleads for him to go to the hospital. Upon their arrival, Sergio belittles Aaron and gives him drugs to keep Aldous from messing up his performance. Aaron, tired of Sergio's abuse, quits on the spot, then walks stage-side with Aldous, trying to convince him to go to the hospital. However, seeing how happy Aldous is while performing, he heads home to reconcile with Daphne.

Months later, Aldous, sober again, has returned to fame with a new single produced by Aaron based on events from their night in Las Vegas.

== Cast ==
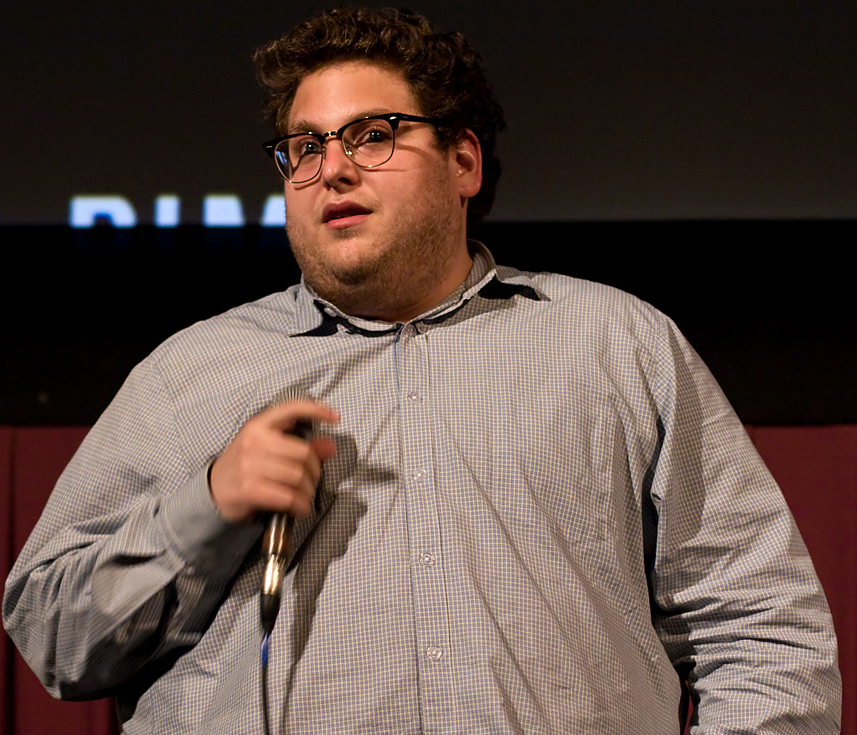
Jonah Hill at a panel for the film at the Alamo Drafthouse in Austin, Texas, in May 2010

- Jonah Hill as Aaron Green, a record company employee
- Russell Brand as Aldous Snow, a free-spirited rock star with a faltering career who first appears in Forgetting Sarah Marshall
- Elisabeth Moss as Daphne Binks, Aaron's girlfriend
- Rose Byrne as Jackie Q, a scandalous pop star, Aldous's on and off girlfriend and Naples's mother
- Colm Meaney as Jonathan Snow, Aldous's father
- Sean Combs as Sergio Roma, a volatile and aggressive record company owner and Aaron's boss who assigns him to manage Aldous
- Aziz Ansari as Matty Briggs, one of Aaron's co-workers
- Carla Gallo as Destiny, a groupie
- Nick Kroll as Kevin McLean, one of Aaron's co-workers
- Kristen Schaal as a Today Show production assistant
- Kali Hawk as Kali Coleman, one of Aaron's co-workers
- T. J. Miller as Brian, a hotel clerk
- Stephanie Faracy as Wendy
- Jim Piddock as Limousine Driver in London
- Dinah Stabb as Lena Snow, Aldous's mother
- Ellie Kemper as one of Aaron's co-workers
- Lino Facioli as Naples, Jackie Q and Aldous's son, later revealed to have been fathered by a photographer
- Da'Vone McDonald as Sergio's Security Guard
- Jake Johnson as Jazz Man, one of Aaron's co-workers
- Karl Theobald as Aldous's assistant
- Neal Brennan as Brian's roommate
- Lindsey Broad as Pocket Dial Girl

=== Cameo appearances ===
- Kristen Bell as Sarah Marshall, an actress and Aldous's former girlfriend
- Lars Ulrich
- Tom Felton
- Christina Aguilera
- Pink
- Kurt F. Loder
- Meredith Vieira
- Mario Lopez
- Pharrell Williams
- Paul Krugman
- Rick Schroder
- Zöe Salmon
- Katy Perry (deleted scenes)
- Alanis Morissette (deleted scenes)
- Meghan Markle (uncredited)
- Dee Snider (uncredited)
- Holly Weber (uncredited)
- Billy Bush
- Rachel Roberts

Brand's friends Karl Theobald, Greg "Mr Gee" Sekweyama and Jamie Sives also appear in the film.

== Production ==
=== Development ===
A week after the release of Forgetting Sarah Marshall, Universal Studios announced a new film, Get Him to the Greek, reuniting Jonah Hill and Russell Brand with writer/director Nicholas Stoller and producer Judd Apatow. Variety initially announced the project would focus on "fresh-out-of-college insurance adjuster (Hill) who is hired to accompany an out-of-control rock star (Brand) from London to a gig at L.A.'s Greek Theatre." In July 2008, Brand mentioned that he would be reprising his Aldous Snow role from Forgetting Sarah Marshall, in a new film from Apatow in which the character was back on drugs.

In an interview with CHUD.com, Apatow would later reveal that Get Him to the Greek was indeed a spin-off of Forgetting Sarah Marshall with Brand again playing a no-longer-sober Aldous Snow while in a different interview Nicholas Stoller said that Hill would play a different character named Aaron Green, a young music executive.

=== Filming ===
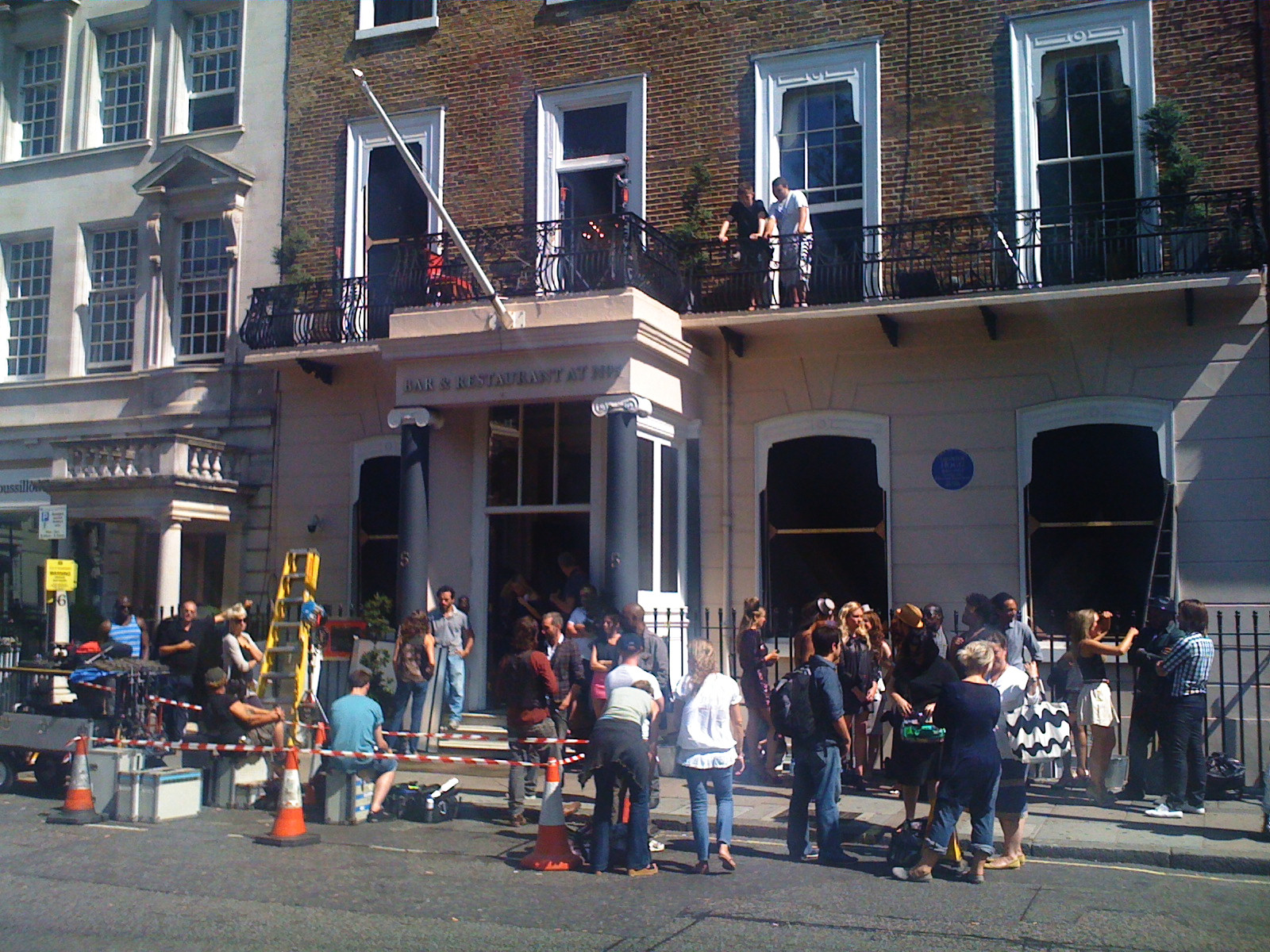
Filming in Cavendish Square, London.

While Brand was backstage at the Paramount studio lot preparing to present the 2008 MTV Video Music Awards, he approached Christina Aguilera, Pink, and Katy Perry about filming cameos for Get Him to the Greek.

Rehearsals began on April 27, 2009, and filming began on May 12 of that year. The film was shot in New York City, Rochester, Las Vegas, Los Angeles and London. News footage featured in the film was filmed after a Russell Brand stand up performance of "Scandalous" at the O2 Arena in London, which most of the audience stayed for. While filming in Trafalgar Square, Brand was pushed into a fountain by a passerby.

== Release ==
The film was released on June 4, 2010, in the United States. Get Him to the Greek grossed $61 million in the United States and Canada and $30.7 million overseas bringing its worldwide total to $91.7 million, against a production budget of $40 million.

Get Him to the Greek was released alongside Killers, Marmaduke, and Splice, and in its opening weekend debuted second at the box office behind Shrek Forever After with $17.6 million. The film fell to fourth the following week with a weekend gross of $10.1 million.

In the UK, Get Him to the Greek opened at No. 1 grossing £1.6 million in its first week before dropping to No. 2 the following week with takings of £1 million.

== Reception ==
On Rotten Tomatoes, Get Him to the Greek has an approval rating of 72% based on 202 reviews, with an average rating of 6.30/10. The site's critical consensus reads, "Thanks to a suitably raunchy script and a pair of winning performances from Jonah Hill and Russell Brand, Get Him to the Greek is one of the year's funniest comedies." On Metacritic, the film has a weighted average score of 65 out of 100, based on 39 critics, indicating "generally favorable" reviews. Audiences polled by CinemaScore gave the film an average grade of "B" on an A+ to F scale.

Roger Ebert of the Chicago Sun-Times gave the film three out of four stars, writing: "under the cover of slapstick, cheap laughs, raunchy humor, gross-out physical comedy and sheer exploitation, Get Him to the Greek also is fundamentally a sound movie."

=== Controversy ===
A scene in which Jonah Hill's character is raped has been lambasted by critics as being "particularly egregious" and "horrific" and of furthering rape culture by "reinforc(ing) cultural myths surrounding the acceptance of rape."

After Combs was arrested and indicted in the Southern District of New York on September 16, 2024, on charges of racketeering, sex trafficking by force, and transportation for purposes of prostitution, observers noticed that his Get Him to the Greek character Sergio Roma committed several crimes in the film that were similar to his sexual misconduct allegations in real life. Combs was later sentenced to 50 months in prison on two of his charges.

In addition to Combs, Russell Brand has also been accused and convicted of multiple sexual misconduct allegations, following on from a 2023 joint-investigation by Channel 4's Dispatches and The Sunday Times. On 5 November 2026, Brand was convicted of one count of rape and three counts of sexual assault.

In addition to Combs and Brand, in 2023, Jonah Hill — then still dealing with accusations of abuse from ex-girlfriend Sarah Brady — was accused by former child star, Alexa Nikolas, of getting her drunk and sexually assaulting her at the home of actor Justin Long when Hill was 24 years old and Nikolas was a 16 year old minor. While Nikolas is quoted as saying that what Hill did to her “was a crime,” no criminal charges were ever brought against Hill.

=== Home media ===
A two-disc and one-disc unrated and theatrical version of the film was released on DVD and Blu-ray Disc on September 28, 2010.

== Music ==
Kim Garner, the senior vice president of marketing and artist development at Universal Republic Records, recalled on Brand and Universal Pictures' plans to oppose a traditional soundtrack release for the film, and instead plan it to release it as an actual rock band album. This resulted in the debut studio album of Aldous Snow's band Infant Sorrow being unveiled under the same title as the film. Composer Lyle Workman, the film's producer Judd Apatow and Jason Segel, who starred in Forgetting Sarah Marshall, were credited for the lyrics to the soundtrack that features prominent musicians and artists, such as Jarvis Cocker, Mike Viola amongst others. The 15-song album was released on June 1, 2010, along with a deluxe edition that featured four other songs.

The following songs were featured in the film, but not included in the soundtrack:

1. "And Ghosted Pouts (Take the Veil Cerpin Taxt)" by The Mars Volta
2. "London Calling" by The Clash
3. "Anarchy in the U.K." by The Sex Pistols
4. "20th Century Boy" by T.Rex
5. "Rocks Off" by The Rolling Stones
6. "Another Girl, Another Planet" by The Only Ones
7. "Strict Machine" by Goldfrapp
8. "Ghosts 'n' Stuff" by Deadmau5 featuring Rob Swire
9. "Personality Crisis" by The New York Dolls
10. "Girls on the Dance Floor" by Far East Movement
11. "Heureux Tous Les Deux" by Frank Alamo
12. "Come on Eileen" by Dexys Midnight Runners
13. "Cretin Hop" by The Ramones
14. "Stop Drop and Roll" by Foxboro Hot Tubs
15. "Touch My Body" by Mariah Carey
16. "Love Today" by Mika
17. "Fuck Me I'm Famous" by DJ Dougal and Gammer
18. "What Planet You On" by Bodyrox featuring Luciana
19. "Inside of You" by Infant Sorrow (which was originally featured in Forgetting Sarah Marshall).
20. "Licky feat. Princess Superstar (Herve Remix)" by Larry Tee

== See also ==
- List of films set in Las Vegas
