= D. Ramirez =

English DJ and producer (born 1970)

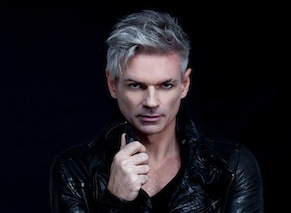
- Ramirez in 2011

Background information
- Born: Dean Marriott; 13 August 1970 (age 56); England, United Kingdom
- Genres: Electronic, house, electro house, tech house, acid house
- Occupations: DJ, producer, remixer, record label owner
- Years active: 1995–present
- Labels: ToolRoom Records, Slave Recordings, Underwater Records, Four:twenty Recordings
- Website: www.dramirez.co.uk

D. Ramirez (born Dean Marriott; 13 August 1970) is an English house producer and DJ. He has used a variety of pseudonyms including The Lisa Marie Experience (with Neil Hynde), Cordial, Finger Fest and Rambo. He has achieved five top 20 hits, and appeared on BBC Television's music programme, Top of the Pops. His highest standing in the mainstream music scene was his remix of Bodyrox's "Yeah Yeah", which earned him an Ivor Novello Award nomination.

== Musical career ==
Ramirez is most commonly known in the world of dance music as a champion of the upbeat electro house style, but more recent times have shown a move away from electro house in to more underground techno material. He has said "I don't feel comfortable with commerciality... When people start expecting certain things of me I tend to back away".

Ramirez also owns his own record label, Slave Recordings, on which he released his own EP Nitr8. He is also known for his technical musical knowledge and hosts a musical forum on his website. 2011 has seen him release on Toolroom Records, with his D.Ramirez & Friends EP, which features collaborations with the likes of Kristoph and Robert Owens.

2017 saw D.Ramirez launch music production masterclasses to teach aspiring producers culminating in a deep-dive into sound design

He is currently one of the music production instructors at SubBass Academy of Electronic Music, and is a Contributor at the Toolroom Academy.

== Discography ==
=== Singles ===
- 2007 D.Ramirez & Mark Knight - Colombian Soul - Original
- 2009 Mark Knight & D.Ramirez v Underworld - Downpipe (Original Club Mix)
- 2010 D.Ramirez & MARA Feat Steve Edwards - Keep Us Together
- 2011 D.Ramirez & Dirty South - Shield (Original Club Mix)
- 2011 D.Ramirez - What You Need (Original Club Mix)
- 2011 D.Ramirez - Everybody Has The Right (Original Mix)
- 2012 D.Ramirez - Get Down (Original Club Mix)
- 2012 D.Ramirez - Won't Give Up (Original Club Mix)
- 2013 D.Ramirez - Open Your Eyes (Original Club Mix)
- 2014 D.Ramirez & Guy Williams - No Guarantees (Original Mix)
- 2016 D.Ramirez - Brutal Power (Original Mix)
- 2017 D.Ramirez - Satur8
- 2018 D.Ramirez - Get Wrecked
- 2019 D.Ramirez - Overload (Original Mix)
- 2023 D.Ramirez - Yeah Yeah (2023 Rework)
- 2024 Smokin Jo, D.Ramirez - Inner Mind
- 2024 Smokin Jo & D. Ramirez - In The Night (Extended Mix)

=== Remixes ===
- 2004 Visionary – Higher Feeling (D. Ramirez Remix)
- 2006 Noir - My MTV (D. Ramirez "Evil Business" Remix)
- 2008 Max Linen Ft. Keithen Carter - Flashback (D.Ramirez Remix)
- 2010 Hardsoul presents Roog & Greg - Über (D.Ramirez Remix)
- 2010 Dirty Vegas - Changes (The D.Ramirez Squeezebox Remix)
- 2012 Roger Sanchez - Lost (D. Ramirez Lost In Rave Remix)
- 2012 Tomaz Vs. Filterheadz - Sunshine (D. Ramirez Remix)
- 2014 Spoiled - All I Know (D. Ramirez Old Skool Remix)
- 2019 Hybrid - Hold Your Breath (D.Ramirez Remix)

=== Recordings ===
- "(Keep on) Jumpin'" by the Lisa Marie Experience was a big hit in the UK in 1996. It reached No. 7 on the UK Singles Chart and No. 1 on the UK Dance Singles Chart.
