= Ian Sklarsky =

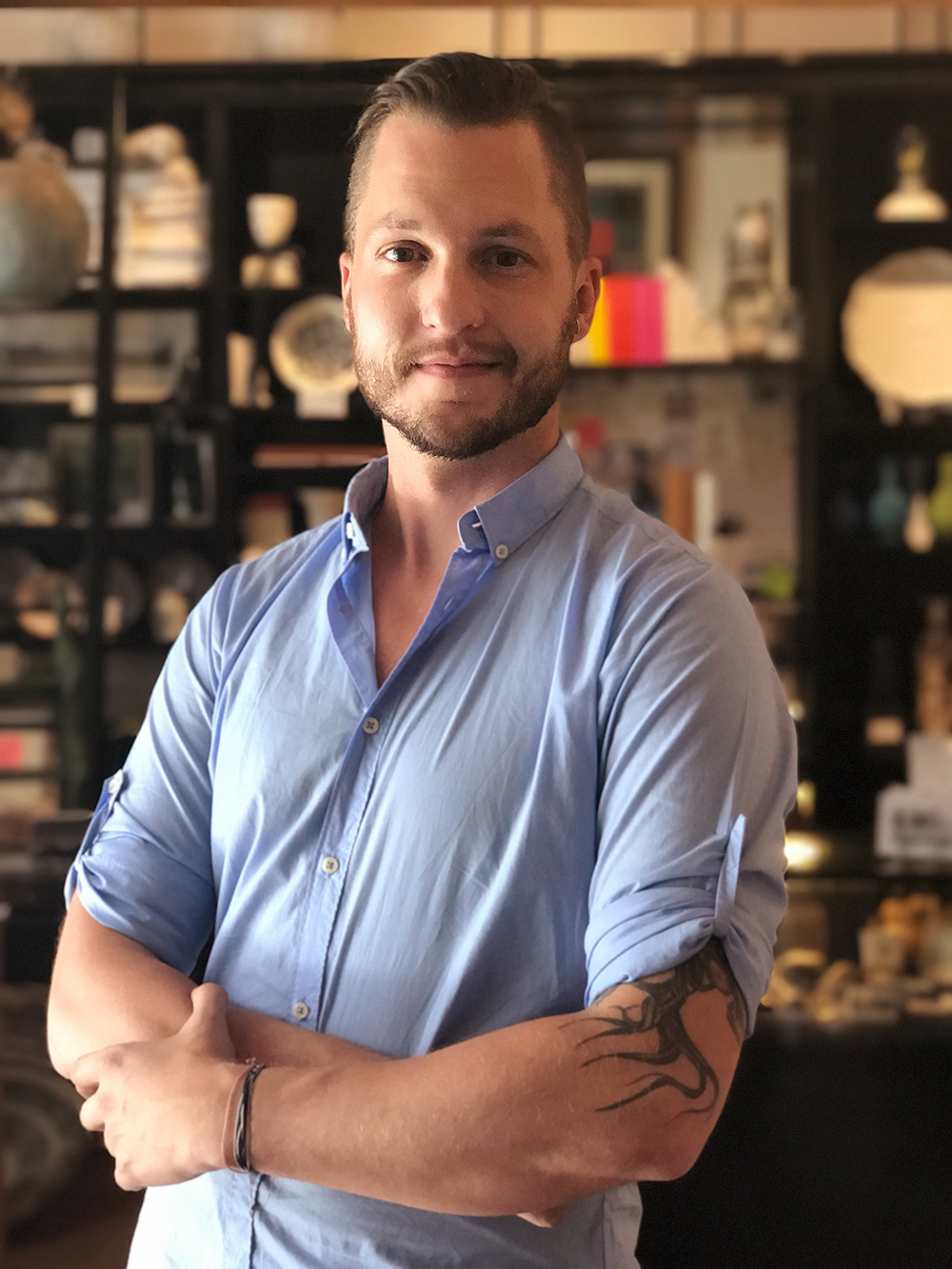
- Ian Sklarsky in Cape Town, South Africa
- Born: Ian Lee Sklarsky; March 13, 1982 (age 44); West Islip, New York, United States
- Occupation: Artist
- Years active: 2007 – present
- Website: iansklarsky.com

Ian Sklarsky is an artist who creates blind contour portraits using pen, ink, and water color. Inspired by how blind contour requires an artist to remain focused on the subject without distraction, Sklarsky’s ongoing series of artworks are drawn with just a single line and without looking at the sketch until finished. Ian first learned the traditional method of blind contour drawing during a high school art class. By 2012, he had completed over 700 portraits spanning five years including life-size format group pictures. His works have been exhibited in New York City fashion shows, hotels, restaurants, and galleries. In September 2014, Guest of a Guest named Sklarsky as one of NYC's most creative power players – from the worlds of fashion, art, media and beyond. Sklarsky’s drawings were featured throughout the 2015 Oslo Freedom Forum where he used his technique to draw live portraits of the event’s speakers.

The Bernic Hotel in Manhattan commissioned Ian Sklarsky as mixed media artist-in-residence in 2015. In spring of 2016, Sklarsky developed an adult coloring book in collaboration with Yotel featuring iconic New York City imagery. In October 2016, TED (conference) invited Sklarsky to give a live demo of his style of blind contour drawing in Cape Town South Africa.

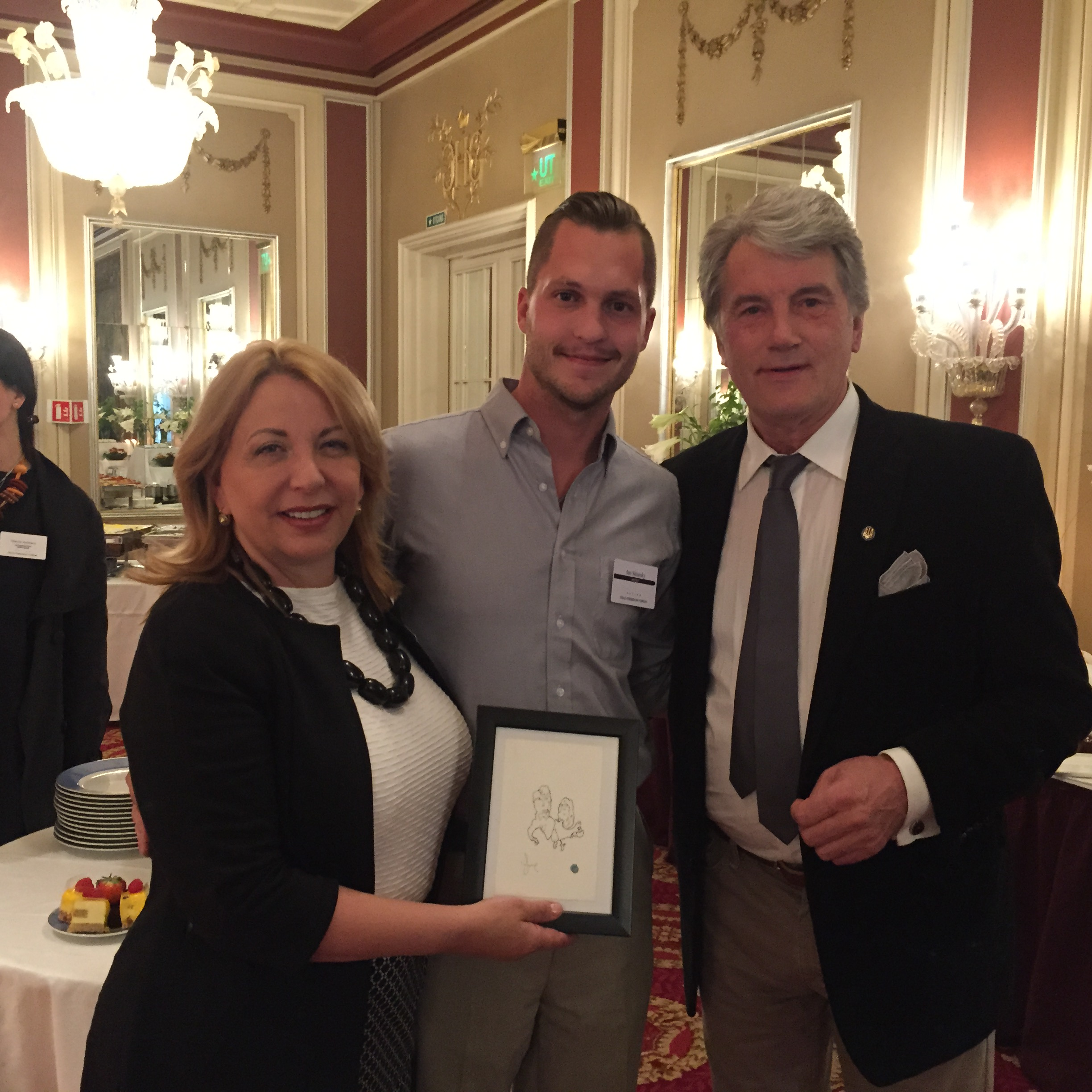
Ian Sklarsky with Viktor Yushchenko and Kateryna Yushchenko at the 2015 Oslo Freedom Forum

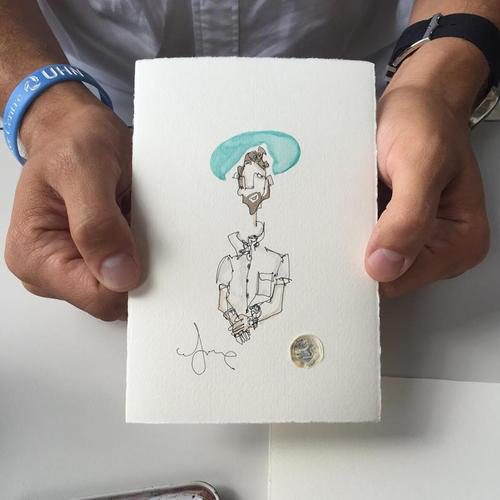
Blind contour portrait, 2015

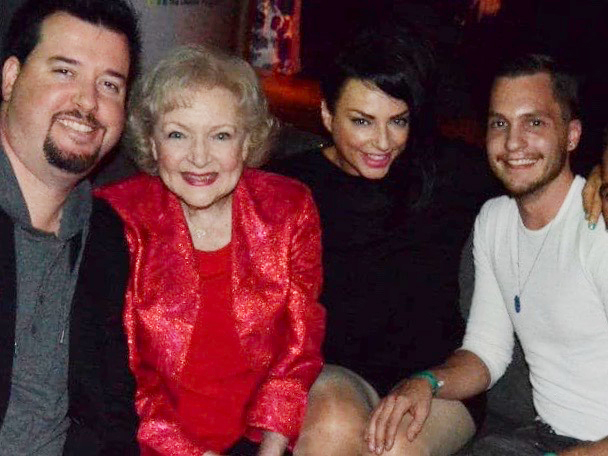
Dave Audé, Betty White, Luciana (singer), and Ian Sklarsky at the 'I'm Still Hot' premiere in LA
