= Olivia Holt discography =

Recordings by American singer-songwriter

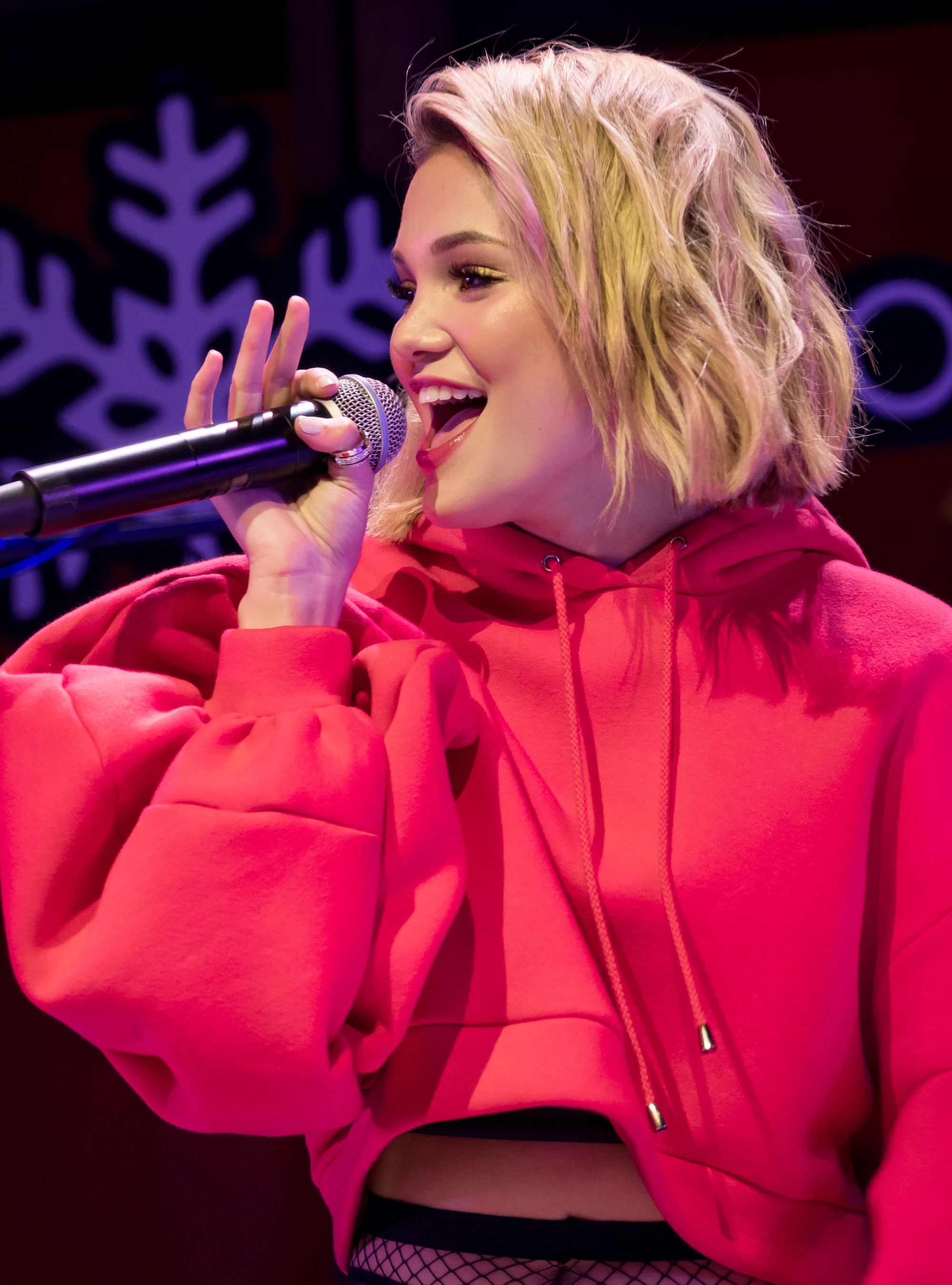
- Holt performing in December 2017
- EPs: 1
- Compilation albums: 3
- Singles: 12
- Music videos: 17
- Promotional singles: 5

American singer and songwriter Olivia Holt has released four extended plays, 12 singles and 17 music videos. In October 2014, Holt signed a record deal with Hollywood Records. Her debut single, "Phoenix", came out on May 13, 2016. The music video was released on June 23, 2016. Olivia, her debut EP, was released on July 15, 2016.

== Extended plays ==
List of extended plays, with selected chart positions and details
Title	Details	Peak chart positions
Title	Details	US Heat.
Olivia	Released: July 15, 2016; Label: Hollywood; Formats: CD, digital download, streaming	19

== Compilations ==
List of compilations, with selected details
Title	Details
In My Feelings	Released: June 11, 2021; Label: Universal; Formats: Streaming
Dance Like No One's Watching	Released: July 19, 2021; Label: Universal; Formats: Streaming
Remix Like You Mean It	Released: September 3, 2021; Label: Universal; Formats: Streaming

== Singles ==
=== As lead artist ===
List of singles as lead artist, with selected chart positions, showing year released and album name
Title	Year	chart positions								Album
Title	Year	US Club	BEL	DEN	GER	ITA	NLD	POR	SWE	Album
"Phoenix"	2016	—	—	—	—	—	—	—	—	Olivia
"History"	2016	—	21	—	96	78	49	96	32	Olivia
"Party on a Weekday" (with Mybadd)	2017	—	—	39	—	—	—	—	—	Non-album singles
"Paradise" (with Brandon Beal)	2017	—	—	—	—	—	—	—	—	Non-album singles
"Generous"	2017	1	—	—	—	—	—	—	—	Dance Like No One's Watching
"16 Steps" (with Martin Jensen or remix with Yxng Bane)	2018	—	—	—	—	—	—	—	—	Non-album singles
"Distance" (with Nicky Romero)	2019	—	—	—	—	—	—	—	—	Non-album singles
"Bad Girlfriend"	2019	—	—	—	—	—	—	—	—	In My Feelings
"Love U Again" (with R3hab)	2020	40	—	—	—	—	—	—	—	In My Feelings
"Talk Me Out of It"	2020	—	—	—	—	—	—	—	—	Non-album single
"Do You Miss Me"	2021	—	—	—	—	—	—	—	—	In My Feelings
"Love On You."	2021	—	—	—	—	—	—	—	—	In My Feelings
"Next"	2021	—	—	—	—	—	—	—	—	Dance Like No One's Watching
"A Song to Make out To" (with Stevie Matthew)	2023	—	—	—	—	—	—	—	—	Non-album single
"—" denotes releases that did not chart or were not released in that territory.

=== As featured artist ===
List of singles as a featured artist, showing year released and album name
Title	Year	Album
"Sad Song" (RJ Remix) (We the Kings featuring Olivia Holt)	2017	Non-album single
"Wrong Move" (R3hab and THRDL!FE featuring Olivia Holt)	2018	The Wave
"Speaker" (Banx & Ranx featuring Olivia Holt and ZieZie)	2019	Non-album single

=== Promotional singles ===
List of promotional singles, showing year released and album name
Title	Year	Peak chart positions	Album
Title	Year	US Dance	Album
"Carry On" (Note: This song was used in the Disneynature documentary Bears)	2014	1	Non-album promotional single
"Time of Our Lives	2014	6	Disney Channel Play It Loud
"Christmas (Baby Please Come Home)"	2017	—	A Hollywood Christmas
"You've Got a Friend in Me" (with Jordan Fisher)	2018	—	Non-album promotional single
"Today"	2021	—	In My Feelings
"—" denotes releases that did not chart or were not released in that territory.

== Other charted songs ==
List of other charted songs, showing year released, with selected chart positions and album name
Title	Year	Peak chart positions	Album
Title	Year	US Dance	Album
"Winter Wonderland"	2012	6	Disney Channel Holiday Playlist
"Fearless"	2012	2	Make Your Mark: Ultimate Playlist
"Nothing's Gonna Stop Me Now"	2012	6	Make Your Mark: Ultimate Playlist
"Had Me @ Hello"	2012	1	Make Your Mark: Ultimate Playlist
"These Boots Are Made for Walkin'"	2013	6	Shake It Up: I <3 Dance
"—" denotes releases that did not chart or were not released in that territory.

== Guest appearances ==
List of other appearances, showing year released, other artist(s) credited and album name
Title	Year	Album
"Snowflakes"	2013	Holidays Unwrapped
"Come Sail Away"	2018	Cloak & Dagger

== Songwriting credits ==
List of songs co-written by Holt for other artists.
Title	Year	Artist	Album
"Rain"	2016	Taeyeon	SM Station Season 1
"Violet"	2019	Cherry Bullet	Let's Play Cherry Bullet

== Music videos ==
List of music videos and showing year released
Year	Title	Notes	Ref.
2014	"Carry On"		
2014	"Do You Want to Build a Snowman?"	as part of Disney Channel Circle of Stars	
2016	"Phoenix"		
2016	"History"		
2017	"Paradise"		
2017	"Generous"		
2018	"Wrong Move"		
2018	"16 Steps"		
2018	"16 Steps (Remix)"		
2019	"Distance"		
2019	"Bad Girlfriend"		
2020	"Love U Again"		
2021	"Do You Miss Me"		
2021	"Next"		
