= X With U =

XU

Single by Tom Budin and Luciana
- Released: 21 September 2017
- Recorded: 2017
- Genre: Dance; electro house
- Length: 3:52
- Label: Onelove
- Songwriters: Tom Budin; Luciana Caproso
- Producers: Tom Budin; Luciana Caproso

Luciana singles chronology
"Yeah Yeah 2017" (2017)	"X With U" (2017)

"X With U" is a song recorded, co-written, and produced by Australian house musician/producer/DJ Tom Budin featuring British singer and co-writer Luciana. The drum-influenced electro house single reached number one on Billboard's Dance Club Songs chart in its 6 January 2018 issue, giving Budin his first American chart topper and Luciana her seventh.

In a November 9, 2017 interview with Billboard, Budin explained how he came up with this song and his involvement with Luciana: "Within only a few days of being in contact with Luciana, we were throwing ideas at one another and I came across the topline for 'X With U.' It was at that exact moment that I knew exactly what I wanted to do with the soundtrack. It took some time to get the song sounding the way it is now. I actually wrote five different versions of it! But I'm glad it ended up the way it did because it's an absolute corker."

Luciana adds that the song was based on a true story, telling Billboard, "I wrote 'X with U' after I'd heard a girl at a club say to her friend in the toilet that she should have spent the night with a guy she had met earlier, she should have gone with her instincts and just hung out with him so that they could've enjoyed each other. I loved the way it sounded and it made think of all of the regrets we accumulate in life. It's so much better to regret the things you have done rather than the things you didn't. 'X' can stand for anything, wherever your imagination and inclination take you."

== Track listing ==
Digital download

1. X with U (Original Club Mix) - 3:52
2. X with U (Extended Club Mix) - 4:06
3. X with U - 3:05
4. X with U (Supermini & Frankie Romano Mix) - 6:19
5. X with U (Radio Edit) - 2:39
6. X With U (Exodus & Shawn White Remix)

== Charts ==
=== Weekly charts ===
Chart (2017–18)	Peak position
US Dance Club Songs (Billboard)	1

=== Year-end charts ===
Chart (2018)	Position
US Dance Club Songs (Billboard)	41
