= Generous =

Generous is an adjective form of generosity.

Generous may also refer to:

- Generous (horse), an Irish thoroughbred racehorse
- "Generous" (song), a 2017 song by Olivia Holt
- Generous Stakes, an American thoroughbred horse race
- Matt Generous (born 1985), an American ice hockey defenseman
- The Generous, a Japanese musical duo

== See also ==
- List of people known as the Generous
