= Only Want You =

Only Want You may refer to:

- "Only Want You" (Skylar Stecker song), 2017
- "Only Want You" (Rita Ora song), 2019
