= Stars (Kristine W song) =

Single by Kristine W
- Released: August 7, 2017
- Recorded: 2017
- Genre: Dance music
- Label: Fly Again Music
- Songwriter(s): Kristine Weitz, Nick Helbling a.k.a. Nikka Bling
- Producer(s): Kristine W

Kristine W singles chronology
| "Out There" (2016) | "Stars" (2017) |

"Stars" is a dance-pop single written and produced by American singer Kristine W and Nick Helbling a.k.a. Nikka Bling. With the January 27, 2018, issue of Billboard, "Stars" became Kristine W's 17th number-one single on the Dance Club Songs chart.

== Track listing ==
=== Original mixes ===
U.S.

1. Stars (Hans Mallon/Kespa Radio)
2. Stars (Hans Mallon/Kespa Club Mix)
3. Stars (Alex Acosta After Midnight Radio)
4. Stars (Alex Acosta After Midnight Club)
5. Stars (Alex Acosta After Midnight Dub)

=== Freejak mixes ===
U.S.

1. Stars (Freejak Radio)
2. Stars (Freejak Club)
3. Stars (Freejak Dub)

=== Candlelight mixes ===
U.S.

1. Stars (Vegas Strong Candlelight Mix)
2. Stars (Vegas Strong Candlelight Mix Stripped)

== Charts ==
| Chart (2018) | Peak position |
|---|---|
| U.S. Dance Club Songs | 1 |

== See also ==
- List of Billboard number-one dance songs of 2018
