= Meet in the Middle (StoneBridge song) =

Single by StoneBridge featuring Haley Joelle
- Released: 29 September 2017
- Genre: Deep house Eurodance
- Length: 5:41 (original mix); 3:07 (radio edit)
- Label: StoneBridge Productions
- Songwriter(s): Sten Hallström; Haley Joelle; Richard Harris
- Producer(s): Sten Hallström

StoneBridge singles chronology
"Put 'Em High 2K16" (2016)	"Meet in the Middle" (2017)

Haley Joelle singles chronology
"Meet in the Middle" (2018)

"Meet in the Middle" is a song by Swedish DJ, producer, and remixer StoneBridge featuring American singer/songwriter Haley Joelle, who wrote the song in 2016 at age 16 with producer/songwriter Richard Harris, who initially passed the demo to StoneBridge and immediately recorded the track afterwards. The single is the third number one for StoneBridge and the first for Joelle in the United States, where it topped the Billboard Dance Club Songs in its 17 February 2018 issue.

== Track listing ==
Digital download (United States)

1. Meet in the Middle (feat. Haley Joelle) [StoneBridge Radio] 3:07
2. Meet in the Middle (feat. Haley Joelle) [Damien Hall Ibiza Mix] 2:58
3. Meet in the Middle (feat. Haley Joelle) [Chris Sammarco Remix] 3:01
4. Meet in the Middle (feat. Haley Joelle) [StoneBridge Extended Mix] 5:41
5. Meet in the Middle (feat. Haley Joelle) [Damien Hall Extended Ibiza Mix] 4:41
6. Meet in the Middle (feat. Haley Joelle) [Chris Sammarco Extended Remix] 5:40

== Charts ==
=== Weekly charts ===
Chart (2018)	Peak position
US Dance Club Songs (Billboard)	1

=== Year-end charts ===
Chart (2018)	Position
US Dance Club Songs (Billboard)	21

== See also ==
- List of number-one dance singles of 2018 (U.S.)
