= (It Happens) Sometimes =

Single by Jack Back
- Released: 14 October 2018
- Recorded: 2018
- Length: 6:08
- Songwriters: David Guetta; Bessie Jones
- Producer: David Guetta

Jack Back singles chronology
"Overtone" (2017)	"(It Happens) Sometimes" (2018)	"Grenade" (2018)

"(It Happens) Sometimes" is a song produced and recorded by David Guetta under the alias Jack Back, released as a single on 14 October 2018. Guetta had returned to using the Jack Back alias in September 2018. The song was inspired by Bessie Jones' recording of her 1960 song "Sometimes" (and in turn inspired Moby's 1998 single "Honey"), but features new lyrics. The track was not included on Guetta's 2018 Jack Back mixtape or album 7.

The single became Guetta's twelfth number one (and his second under the Jack Back alias) on Billboard's Dance Club Songs chart, reaching the summit in its 1 December 2018 issue.

== Track listing ==
Digital download
No.	Title	Length
1.	"(It Happens) Sometimes"	6:08

== Charts ==
Chart (2018)	Peak position
US Dance Club Songs (Billboard)	1
US Hot Dance/Electronic Songs (Billboard)	29

== See also ==
- List of number-one dance singles of 2018 (U.S.)
