= What Planet You On? =

Single by Bodyrox featuring Luciana

from the album Featuring Luciana
- Released: 2007
- Genre: Electro house
- Length: 6:36 (original club mix); 3:22 (radio edit)
- Label: PROTV
- Songwriters: Jon Pearn, Nick Bridges, Luciana Caporaso, Nick Clow

Bodyrox singles chronology
"Yeah Yeah" (2006)	"What Planet You On?" (2007)	"Brave New World" (2009)

Luciana singles chronology
""Bigger Than Big" feat. Super Mal" (2007)	"What Planet You On?" (2007)	"Come On Girl with Taio Cruz" (2008)

"What Planet You On?" is a song by English electro house duo Bodyrox, consisting of English DJs Jon Pearn and Nick Bridges. The single features vocals from English singer Luciana, who also sang on their song "Yeah Yeah". The song was released as a single in 2007 (and in the UK on 7 January 2008) and first appeared as an exclusive on the mix compilation GeneratioNext: The House2Hard Theory, mixed by Bodyrox, on September 15, 2007.

== Music video ==
The official music video for the song features Luciana performing the song in space. This includes riding on a rocket, floating inside a spaceship and walking on a planet. It culminates with her riding the rocket into a space station and blowing it up, a reference to Star Wars (1977).

== Charts ==
Chart (2008)	Peak position
Belgium (Ultratip Bubbling Under Wallonia)	15
Netherlands (Single Top 100)	55
UK Dance (OCC)	1
UK Singles (OCC)	54
UK Singles Downloads (OCC)	71
UK Physical (OCC)	20

== Usage in media ==
In 2007, "What Planet You On" was featured on the soundtrack of EA Sports football game, FIFA 08.

On 5 January 2008, this song was also featured on a promo for Cycle 9 of America's Next Top Model in the UK. In 2009 it was used in BBC Three's "Born on Three" trailer.

In 2008, the track was remixed by Canadian electronic dance artist deadmau5. The remix was featured in the North American TV commercial for the 2008 Ford Focus.

It is also featured in the 2009 British horror film Tormented.
