= Olivia (EP) =

2016 EP by Olivia Holt

EP by Olivia Holt
- Released: July 15, 2016
- Recorded: 2016
- Length: 20:57
- Label: Hollywood
- Producer: Andrew Goldstein; Emanuel Kiriakou; Jens Koerkemeier; Steve Mac; Augie Ray; Scott Robinson; Trion

Olivia Holt chronology
Olivia (2016)	In My Feelings (2021)

Singles from Olivia
- 1. "Phoenix" Released: May 13, 2016; 2. "History" Released: November 21, 2016

Olivia (stylized as OLIVIΛ) is the debut EP by American singer and actress Olivia Holt. It was released on July 15, 2016 through Hollywood Records following the release of her debut single "Phoenix".

== Track listing ==
Olivia EP
No.	Title	Writer(s)	Producer(s)	Length
1.	"Phoenix"	Steve Mac; Ammar Malik; Nina Nesbitt	Steve Mac	3:20
2.	"Thin Air" (featuring Jordan Fisher)	Stephanie Jones; Chelsea Lena; Jens Koerkemeier; Jessica Karpov	Jens Koerkemeier; Emanuel Kiriakou; Andrew Goldstein	3:35
3.	"In the Dark"	Jintae Ko; Tanner Underwood; Julia Michaels; Lindy Robbins	Trion; Scott Robinson	3:29
4.	"What You Love"	Kevin Fisher; Carolina Furoyen; Jintae Ko; Tanner Underwood	Augie Ray	2:55
5.	"History"	Evan Bogart; Ailin Caroline; Andrew Goldstein; Emanuel Kiriakou	Emanuel Kiriakou; Andrew Goldstein	3:23
Total length:				16:42

== Charts ==
Chart (2016)	Peak position
US Billboard Heatseekers	19
