= I Like That (Richard Vission and Static Revenger song) =

Single by Richard Vission and Static Revenger featuring Luciana
- Released: 2009
- Length: 2:21 (radio edit); 5:09 (full version)
- Label: Vicious Vinyl; Universal Music
- Songwriters: D. White; L. Caporoso; N. Clow; R. Gonzales

Richard Vission singles chronology
"Any Other Day" (2009)	"I Like That" (2009)

Static Revenger singles chronology
"Round & Around" (2006)	"I Like That" (2009)	"Skin I'm In" (2010)

Luciana singles chronology
"Brave New World" (2008)	"I Like That" (2009)	"Shut Your Mouth" (2009)

Audio sample
- "I Like That": file; help

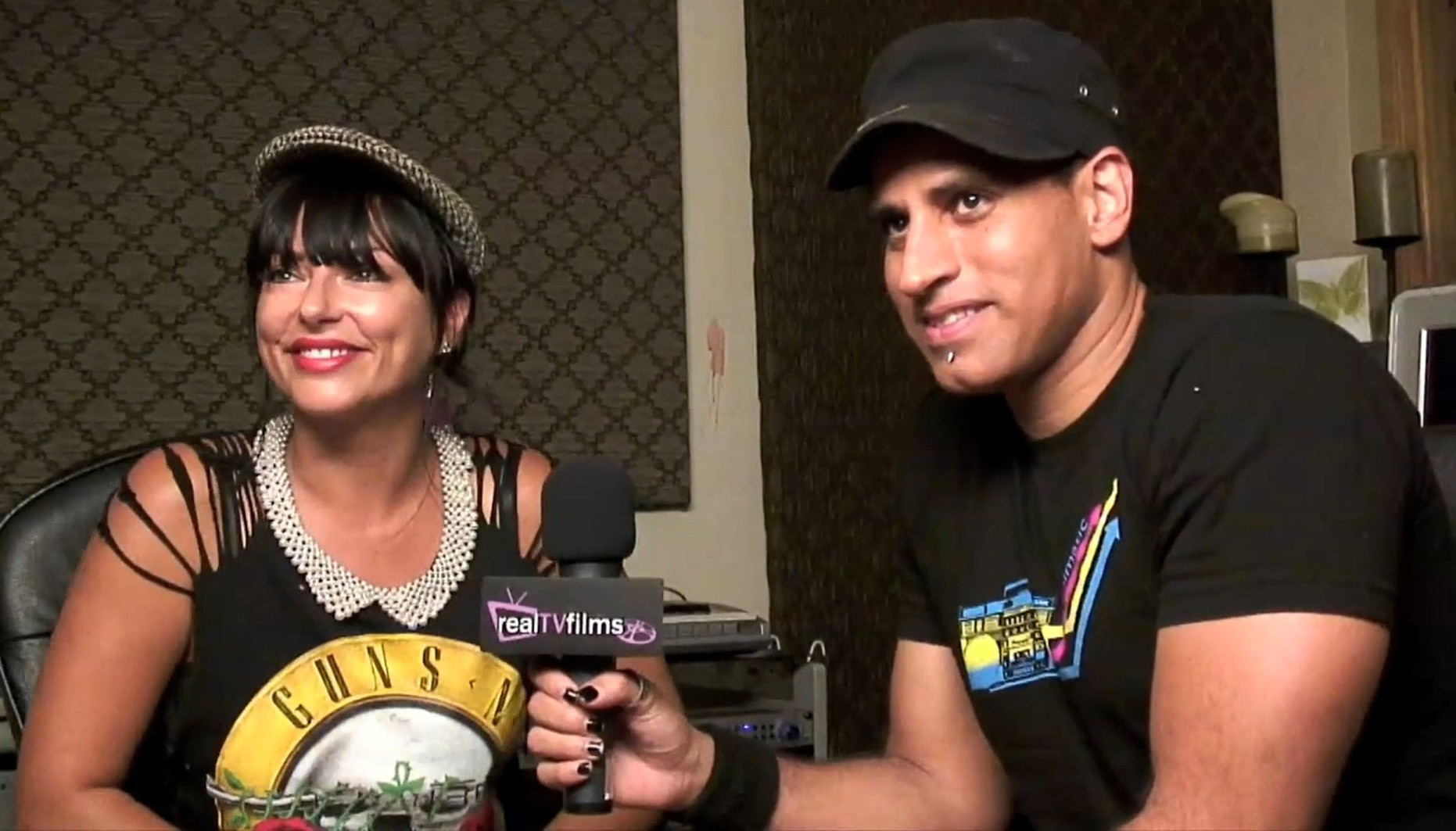
Luciana Caporaso and Richard Vission discuss I Like That in 2009

"I Like That" is a single by Canadian music producer Richard Vission and American music producer Static Revenger, starring English singer Luciana. The two producers and the singer co-wrote the song with Nick Clow.

"I Like That" was a chart success in Australia and New Zealand, peaking at number three on the Australian Singles Chart and number 19 on the New Zealand Singles Chart. It is certified double platinum in Australia. The song also found popularity in North America, topping the US Billboard Dance Club Songs chart and peaking at number 86 on the Canadian Hot 100.

== Charts ==
=== Weekly charts ===
Chart (2010)	Peak position
Australia (ARIA)	3
Australian Club Chart (ARIA)	8
Australian Dance (ARIA)	1
Canada Hot 100 (Billboard)	86
Canada (Nielsen SoundScan)	74
New Zealand (Recorded Music NZ)	19
US Bubbling Under Hot 100 (Billboard)	11
US Dance Club Songs (Billboard)	1
US Pop Airplay (Billboard)	36

=== Year-end charts ===
Chart (2010)	Position
Australia (ARIA)	37
Australian Club Chart (ARIA)	27
Australian Dance (ARIA)	8

== Certifications ==
Region	Certification	Certified units/sales
Australia (ARIA)	2× Platinum	140,000^{^}
^{^} Shipments figures based on certification alone.

== Release history ==
Release dates and formats for "I Like That"
Region	Date	Format	Label(s)	Ref.
United States	July 26, 2010	Mainstream airplay	Interscope	

== In popular culture ==
"I Like That" was featured in Step Up 3D (2010) and The Darkest Hour (2011).

== See also ==
- List of number-one dance singles of 2010 (U.S.)
