= Only Want You (Skylar Stecker song) =

Single by Skylar Stecker
- Released: March 10, 2017
- Recorded: 2017
- Genre: Dance-pop
- Length: 3:21 (original)
- Label: Cherrytree Records; Interscope Records
- Songwriters: Crystal Carr; Pierre Medor; Bruce Leon Robinson; Tricky Stewart; Shantee Tyler
- Producer: Tricky Stewart

Skylar Stecker singles chronology
"How Did We" (2017)	"Only Want You" (2017)	"Blame" (2017)

"Only Want You" is a song recorded and written by American singer Skylar Stecker. The track, produced by Tricky Stewart, reached number one on Billboard's Dance Club Songs chart in its September 2, 2017 issue, giving Stecker her second number-one, her first being a cover of "Sweet Dreams" with JX Riders in 2016.

== Track listings ==
Single

1. "Only Want You" (original) – 3:21

Remixes

- Only Want You (Dave Aude Extended Remix)
- Only Want You (Dave Aude Radio Edit)
- Only Want You (Dave Aude Dub)
- Only Want You (Dave Aude Dub Dub)
- Only Want You (Alex Acosta Remix)
- Only Want You (Alex Acosta Dub)
- Only Want You (Richard Vission & Loren Moore Remix)
