= Four:twenty Recordings =

- Parent company: Hope Recordings
- Founded: 2001
- Genre: house, techno, electronica
- Location: United Kingdom
- Official website: fourtwentyrecordings.com

Four:twenty Recordings is an independent record label begun in Bristol, England in 2001. Its founder, Luke Allen, explains that Four:twenty's objective is to promote "innovative forward thinking electronic dance music".

Since the label's outset nearly a decade ago, it has released records for many different artists - both those with a popular name on the dance music scene, and also those straight from the underground. Some producers which have released records with Four:twenty include: Loco Dice, Martin Buttrich, James Mowbray & D Ramirez, Daniel Taylor, Tom Demac and, most recently, Glimpse, Solomun, Leiam Sullivan, Craig Torrance, TG, B-Pole, Martin Dawson, and Giles Smith.
