= Skylar Simone =

American singer and actress (born 2002)

- Simone in 2026
- Born: Skylar Star Stecker; April 24, 2002 (age 24); Tampa, Florida, U.S.
- Occupations: Singer; actress
- Years active: 2011–present
- Height: 5 ft 7 in (170 cm)
- Musical career
- Genres: R&B; pop; dance
- Instruments: Vocals; piano; guitar; drums
- Website: www.skylarsimone.com//

Skylar Star Stecker (born April 24, 2002), known professionally as Skylar Simone, is an American singer, songwriter, and actress. In 2015, she released her debut studio album, This Is Me. In March 2019, she independently released her second album, Redemption. Skylar released her EP Earth Signs in the fall of 2021, the follow-up to Redemption. In 2022, she released a string of new R&B singles: "hate that for you", "What’s Good", and "Know It’s Wrong". In 2024 she released her EP SHIVER, followed by recent releases such as “WhatsInIt4Me”, “UberEx”, “Do U Ever”, and “Pedestal”.

== Life ==
Born on April 24, 2002, in Tampa, Florida, Stecker is the daughter of ex-NFL player Aaron Stecker and his wife Kara. She has a younger brother, Dorsett. She was born in Tampa and raised in both New Orleans and Wisconsin before moving to Los Angeles at nine years old.

== Career ==
In 2012, she began her career by singing the national anthem at Wisconsin Badgers, New Orleans Saints, UCLA, and Green Bay Packers games, as well as a NASCAR race. She performed the national anthem more than one hundred times, including at an Anaheim Angels' game in May 2014.

In August 2013, she began actively recording and releasing cover videos on her YouTube channel. In the fall of 2013, Stecker had a guest-starring role in the ABC comedy Super Fun Night.

Her first studio album, This Is Me, was released on September 25, 2015.

"Rooftop" debuted on the Dance Club Songs chart at No. 45 on June 13, 2015. It peaked at No. 11 on July 25, 2015. She released another version of her album This Is Me in June 2016, titled This Is Me: Signature Version. In September 2016, her cover of Sweet Dreams with JX Riders reached number 1 on the Dance Club Songs chart.

On March 10, 2017, Simone released the single "Only Want You". It was written by Crystal Carr and Shantee "Kissie Lee" Tyler and produced by Tricky Stewart. Following the release of "Only Want You", she was named Radio Disney's Next Big Thing in May 2017. "Only Want You" became Simone's second number one on Billboard's Dance Club Songs Chart in its September 2, 2017 issue.

Simone's song, "Crazy Beautiful", was used in The Sims 4 soundtrack, where she recorded the song entirely in the Simlish language used in the game. It is available to play through music devices during gameplay.

In 2015, Simone portrayed Ridley in two episodes of Austin & Ally, "Karaoke & Kalamity" and "Mini-Me's & Muffin Baskets".

Simone's song, "How Did We", was on the soundtrack for the 2017 film Everything, Everything. Prior to the release of the soundtrack and film, she released a music video for the song with scenes from the movie. Simone released a single titled "Blame" on October 27, 2017, which became her third number one on Billboard's Dance Club Songs Chart in its March 24, 2018 issue.

In May 2018, Simone, formerly with Interscope and Cherrytree, became an independent artist. She also performed the national anthem at the Los Angeles Chargers' season opener home game in September 2018 and the Los Angeles Lakers' game in October 2018.

On March 15, 2019, Simone released her second studio album, Redemption, her first independent release. Shortly after its release, Simone performed the national anthem at an Anaheim Ducks game. Her LA release show for the album, held at The Roxy, sold out, and was followed by a show in Madison, Wisconsin.

On January 15, 2021, Simone released a single called "Superman" as the first official single for her EP "Earth Signs", which also included the singles "Questions" and "FWY".

On May 3, 2024, Simone made her debut under Def Jam Recordings with her single and music video “Shiver." She later went on to release her EP "Shiver" on August 15, 2024 before parting ways with Def Jam in February 2025.

== Artistry ==
Her main influences are Prince, Bruno Mars, Mariah Carey, Chaka Khan, Alicia Keys, and Sheila E.

== Discography ==
Skylar Simone discography
- Studio albums: 2
- EPs: 4
- Singles: 18

=== Studio albums ===
Title	Details	Track list
This Is Me	Released: September 25, 2015; Format: CD, digital download; Label: Cherrytree, Interscope	Track list: 1. "That's What's Up"; 2. "You Got the Golden Touch"; 3. "That's Love"; 4. "Crazy Beautiful"; 5. "Bring Me to Life"; 6. "Rooftop"; 7. "Not Afraid of Love"; 8. "Never Enough"; 9. "Boomerang"; 10. "Rascal"; 11. "Break My Heart"; 12. "Everlasting"
Redemption	Released: March 15, 2019; Format: Digital download; Label: Self-released	Track list: 1. "Redemption"; 2. "Up on Game"; 3. "Sleep On"; 4. "Let it Pour"; 5. "Obvious"; 6. "This is Me Now"; 7. "Playing for Keeps"; 8. "Convenient"; 9. "Fire"; 10. "Don't Test Me"

=== Extended plays ===
Title	Details	Track list
Uncovered	Released: March 4, 2014; Format: Digital Download; Label: Keep Your Soul	Track list: 1. "Happy"; 2. "Sweater Weather"; 3. "Brave"; 4. "Thinking About You"; 5. "It Won't Stop"
Firecracker	Released: January 27, 2015; Format: Digital download; Label: Independent	Track list: 1. "Rooftop"; 2. "Firecracker"; 3. "Hey"; 4. "Rascal"; 5. "Stand in My Way"; 6. "Fly"; 7. "Save Me Now"
Earth Signs	Released: July 16, 2021; Format: Digital download; Label: Human Re Sources	Track list: 1. "Questions"; 2. "You"; 3. "Earth Sign (feat. Lucien Parker)"; 4. "Locked In"; 5. "Superman"; 6. "Babe"; 7. "FWY"
Shiver	Released: August 16, 2024; Format: Digital download; Label: Def Jam Recordings	Track list: 1. "Shiver"; 2. "Shut Up"; 3. "Permission"; 4. "Someone Who Cares"; 5. "I Wish I Lied"

=== Singles ===
Title	Year	Peak chart positions			Album
Title	Year	US	US Dance	US Dance/Elec	Album
"Little Bit Too Much"	2013	—	—	—	Non-album single
"Hey"	2015	—	—	—	Firecracker
"Rooftop"	2015	—	11	—	This Is Me
"Rascal"	2015	—	—	—	This Is Me
"That's What's Up"	2015	—	—	—	This Is Me
"Crazy Beautiful"	2015	—	14	—	This Is Me
"Bring Me to Life" (featuring Kalin and Myles)	2016	—	—	—	This Is Me
"Let It Show"	2016	—	—	—	Non-album singles
"Sweet Dreams" (with JX Riders)	2016	—	1	29	Non-album singles
"How Did We"	2017	—	—	—	Non-album singles
"Only Want You"	2017	—	1	—	Non-album singles
"Blame"	2017	—	1	—	Non-album singles
"Let It Pour"	2018	—	—	—	Redemption
"Don't Test Me"	2018	—	—	—	Redemption
"Redemption"	2019	—	—	—	Redemption
"Obvious"	2019	—	—	—	Redemption
"This Christmas"	2020	—	—	—	Non-album singles
"Hate That for You"	2021	—	—	—	Non-album singles
"What's Good"	2022	—	—	—	Non-album singles
"What's Good (Acoustic)"	2022	—	—	—	Non-album singles
"Know It's Wrong"	2022	—	—	—	Non-album singles
"Game Day"	2022	—	—	—	Non-album singles
"Miss You Most (At Christmas Time)"	2022	—	—	—	Non-album singles
"Shiver"	2024	—	—	—	Shiver
"Shut Up"	2024	—	—	—	Shiver
"Permission"	2024	—	—	—	Shiver
"WhatsInIt4Me"	2024	—	—	—	
"Uber Ex"	2025	—	—	—	
"Do U Ever"	2025	—	—	—	
"Pedestal"	2025				

== Filmography ==
Television
Year	Title	Role	Notes
2013	Super Fun Night	Brittany	1 episode
2015	Austin & Ally	Ridley	2 episodes

== Awards and nominations ==
Year	Nominee / work	Award	Category	Result	Ref.
2012	Skylar Simone	International Modeling and Talent Association	Most Sought After Talent (Female)	Won	
2015	Skylar Simone	Libby Award	Best Use of Internet Stardom for Animals	Won	
2017	Skylar Simone	Radio Disney's The Next BIG Thing	Radio Disney's The Next BIG Thing	Won	
