= Scotty Boy =

- Origin: Los Angeles, United States
- Genres: EDM
- Labels: Ultra; Juicy; Casa Rossa; InStereo

Scott Schroer, better known by his stage name Scotty Boy, is an American DJ and record producer, based in Los Angeles. Two of his songs have peaked at number one on the Billboard Dance Club Songs chart.

== Early life and career ==
Schroer started DJing at the age of 14 when he would perform at school and local club gigs. The name 'Scotty Boy' was from when a club owner addressed him as that and it eventually became his stage name. In 2017, he released the song "Shine Your Love" with singer Lizzie Curious.

== Discography ==
=== Charted singles ===
Title	Year	Peak chart positions
Title	Year	US Club
"Shine Your Love" (featuring Lizzie Curious)	2017	1

=== Extended plays ===
- 2020: Used to Be Like That [Darklight Recordings]

=== Other singles ===
- 2019: "Do You Realize" (featuring Luca Debonaire) [Sirup Music]
- 2019: "Phonky" [Which Bottle?]
- 2019: "Lost in the Groove (with Lizzie Curious) [Which Bottle?]
- 2019: "Manos Parriba" (with Luca Debonaire) [Which Bottle?]
- 2019: "Saltillo" [Sirup Music]
- 2019: "Party Queen" [Erase Records]
- 2019: "Surrender My Soul" (with Da Funk Junkies) [Which Bottle?]
- 2019: "All for You" (with Alexander Orue and Melody Smith) [Which Bottle?]
- 2020: "What People Say" [Sirup Music]
- 2020: "Move to the Beat" [Darklight Recordings]
- 2020: "The Beat" [Sirup Music]
