= Shine Your Love =

Single by Scotty Boy and Lizzie Curious
- Released: August 28, 2017
- Recorded: 2017
- Genre: Dance; electro house
- Length: 4:24
- Label: 418 Music
- Songwriter(s): Scott Schroer; Lizzie Taylor-Allee
- Producer(s): Scott Schroer; Lizzie Taylor-Allee

Scotty Boy singles chronology
"You’re Not Alone" (2017)	"Shine Your Love" (2017)

"Shine Your Love" is a song recorded, co-written, and produced by American house musician/DJ Scott “Scotty Boy” Schroer featuring British singer and co-writer/producer Lizzie “Curious” Taylor-Allee. The electro house single reached number one on Billboard's Dance Club Songs chart in its January 3, 2018 issue, giving the collaboration their second American chart topper, although it also became Scotty Boy’s third.

The single is also the first original recording for the two artists as their last singles were cover versions of previous recordings. In an interview with Billboard, Schroer explains how he came up with the song: "We knew we wanted to follow with an original song which had a really positive message," adding that "I had the guitar chords in my head for days and, when I hit the studio, the rest of the track just flowed out like it was meant to be. Once I heard Lizzie's vocals, I just knew we had a hit. When he learned of the single reaching number one, "We are thrilled to have reached No. 1 and are so pleased that everyone loves the song as much as we do."

The single also features a laugh that came from Curious’ nephew, who noted as the inspiration behind writing the lyrics, telling Billboard, "I was so inspired to write something really uplifting after hearing the feel-good vibes of the track and that catchy trumpet riff. On this song, the vocals are about all kinds of love. For example, the line 'your laughter is the sweetest sound I've heard' was actually inspired by my cute little nephew, who does indeed have a wonderful laugh!

== Track listing ==
Digital download

1. Shine Your Love - 4:00
2. Shine Your Love (Extended Club Mix) - 4:52
