= Blame (Skylar Stecker song) =

Single by Skylar Stecker
- Released: October 27, 2017
- Recorded: 2017
- Genre: Dance-pop
- Length: 2:52 (original)
- Label: Cherrytree; Interscope
- Songwriters: Dave Audé: John Bourke; Lauren Dyson; Martin Kierszenbaum; Skylar Stecker
- Producer: Tricky Stewart

Skylar Stecker singles chronology
"Only Want You" (2017)	"Blame" (2017)

"Blame" is a song recorded and written by American singer Skylar Stecker. The track, produced by Tricky Stewart, reached number one on Billboard's Dance Club Songs chart in its March 24, 2018 issue, giving Stecker her third number-one and her second as a solo artist after "Only Want You" in 2017.

== Track listings ==
Single

1. "Blame" (original) – 2:52

Remixes

- Blame (Dave Audé Extended Remix) – 6:18
- Blame (Alex Acosta Remix) – 5:32
- Blame (Scotty Boy Dub Extended Remix) – 4:05
- Blame (Scotty Boy Extended Remix) – 4:04
- Blame (Scotty Boy Radio Mix) – 3:37

== Charts ==
=== Weekly charts ===
Chart (2018)	Peak position
US Dance Club Songs (Billboard)	1

=== Year-end charts ===
Chart (2018)	Position
US Dance Club Songs (Billboard)	39
