= I'm Still Hot =

Single by Luciana
- Released: 19 April 2011
- Recorded: 2010
- Genre: Electro house, dance
- Length: 3:06 (radio mix); 4:51 (extended mix)
- Label: Violent Lips; Audacious Records
- Songwriter: Luciana
- Producer: Dave Audé

Luciana singles chronology
"Say I'm Gonna Be Your Boy" (2011)	"I'm Still Hot" (2011)

"I'm Still Hot" is a song by British singer Luciana, released on 19 April 2011. Taken from a yet to be titled EP, David Audé produced the single. "I'm Still Hot" peaked at No. 1 on both the U.S. Hot Dance Club Songs and Hot Dance Airplay charts. As part of its social media campaign to build awareness about life settlements, The Lifeline Program released a second version of the song featuring comedian and actress Betty White on 22 September 2011.

== Background ==
After Luciana moved to the U.S. in late 2010, she met producer Audé, and went to the recording studio to lay down the vocals for the track which he later produced.

In 2011, Luciana collaborated with White to produce the vocals and music video for the second version of "I'm Still Hot". The Lifeline Program released the music video on its website and on YouTube on Oct. 12, 2011. Good Morning America broadcast the world premiere of the music video live, spawning a host of national media coverage encompassing local news stations, news websites, social media networks, blogs, video logs and national entertainment news television programs.

The version of the song featuring White remains available for purchase on iTunes, and a portion of the proceeds of its sales benefits the Greater Los Angeles Zoo Association.

== Music videos ==
There are two different music videos for this song.

The original music video was filmed throughout Los Angeles. The video starts with Luciana waking up on a bed with some men and then she has some flashbacks from the party the night before. She then walks down the street with a stereo and a microphone and starts to sing and dance. The Burgoyne Brothers directed the video.

The music video with White begins with White standing outside of the Los Angeles Zoo saying what a nice day she has had. Then Luciana turns up outside of the zoo in a limousine and shouts "Oi Betty! Come and check out my hot wheels!" The video then goes to White and Luciana in a song, dance and rapping battle. Bodybuilders and a boa constrictor serve as White's entourage as White hand-feeds the bare-chested men slices of cheesecake, an appropriation to The Golden Girls—a television sitcom that Betty White appeared on. Joey Sergo (also known as Joey Swoll) stars as one of the bodybuilders.

The video has a duration of four minutes and 29 seconds, and is available for viewing on The Lifeline Program website and on YouTube.

== Track listing ==
=== iTunes EP version ===
1. "I'm Still Hot" (Original Mix) – 3:06
2. "I'm Still Hot" (Original Extended) – 4:51
3. "I'm Still Hot" (R3hab Remix) – 4:07
4. "I'm Still Hot" (Dave Audé Remix) – 6:03
5. "I'm Still Hot" (SuperMal Remix) – 4:45
6. "I'm Still Hot" (Revolvr & Scotty Boy Remix) – 5:19
7. "I'm Still Hot" (Ecotek & James Egbert Remix) – 5:29

=== Version with Betty White ===
1. "I'm Still Hot" (featuring Betty White) – 2:33

=== 2021 Dave Aude Extended Remix ===
1. "I'm Still Hot" (Dave Aude Extended Remix) - 4:51

=== 2021 Dave Aude Remix ===
1. "I'm Still Hot" (Dave Aude Remix) - 3:36

=== Black Caviar Extended ===
1. "I'm Still Hot" (Black Caviar Extended) - 4:04

=== Black Caviar Remix ===
1. "I'm Still Hot" (Black Caviar Remix) - 3:06

== Chart performance ==
=== Chart Positions ===
The song made its first appearance on US Dance Charts at 43 and after a 7-week climb it topped both US Club Songs and Airplay Charts. After touring and multiple radio interviews in Australia, it debuted on the Australian Singles Chart at 44 and later peaked 42 and stayed inside the top 50 for 4 weeks.

Chart (2011)	Peak position
Australia (ARIA)	42
Australia Dance (ARIA)	6
US Hot Dance Airplay (Billboard)	1
US Hot Dance Club Songs (Billboard)	1

=== Year-end charts ===
Chart (2011)	Position
US Hot Dance Club Songs (Billboard)	48

== Release history ==
=== Original version ===
List of release dates, record label and format details
Country	Date	Format	Label
United States	19 April 2011	Digital download	Violent Lips
United Kingdom	19 April 2011	Digital download	Violent Lips
Australia	October 14, 2011	Digital download	Ministry of Sound

=== Version with Betty White ===
Country	Date	Format	Label
United States	September 22, 2011	Digital download	Sony/AVT, Violent Lips
United Kingdom	September 22, 2011	Digital download	Sony/AVT, Violent Lips

== See also ==
- List of number-one dance singles of 2011 (U.S.)
