= Yeah Yeah (Bodyrox song) =

2006 single by Bodyrox featuring Luciana

Single by Bodyrox featuring Luciana
- Released: 30 October 2006
- Genre: Electro house
- Length: 2:37 (radio edit)
- Label: Eye Industries
- Songwriters: Nathan Thomas; Nick Bridges; Nick Clow; John Pern; Luciana

Bodyrox singles chronology
"Jump" (2005)	"Yeah Yeah" (2006)	"What Planet You On?" (2007)

Luciana singles chronology
"Yeah Yeah" (2006)	"Bigger Than Big" (2007)

"Yeah Yeah" is a song by British electro house duo Bodyrox, written as a collaboration with Jon Pearn, Nick Bridges and Luciana. It was popularised in clubs through a remix by British producer D. Ramirez, which became the backing for the radio edit, featuring Luciana.

Released in October 2006, the song reached number two on the UK Singles Chart, becoming both Bodyrox's and Luciana's highest-charting single. It also charted in several other countries, including Australia, Belgium, Finland, Ireland and the Netherlands. In addition, it topped the UK Dance Singles Chart and peaked at number 15 on the US Billboard Hot Dance Airplay chart in March 2007. Charli XCX sampled "Yeah Yeah" for her 2024 single "Von Dutch", stating that the latter song was meant as a homage to the former.

== Music video ==
The music video is available in both censored and uncensored form. Both versions feature Luciana and an assortment of young adults in a dingy room. Euphemisms, including the connecting of microphone cables and spilling of milk, are subtly woven into both versions of the video, and they conclude with Luciana dousing the room with petrol and sparking a cigarette lighter.

As the music continues, the young adults become increasingly aroused and start to make out with each other if in pairs, or rub themselves if alone; in the uncensored version of the video, the behaviour extends into crotch clutching and bared breast fondling.

== Track listings ==
UK CD single

1. "Yeah Yeah" (D. Ramirez radio edit)
2. "Yeah Yeah" (D. Ramirez vocal club mix)
3. "Yeah Yeah" (Electro club mix)
4. "Yeah Yeah" (D. Ramirez instrumental)
5. "Yeah Yeah" (video)

UK 12-inch single

A. "Yeah Yeah" (D. Ramirez vocal club mix)
B. "Yeah Yeah" (Fred Falke dub mix)

Australian CD single

1. "Yeah Yeah" (D. Ramirez radio edit)
2. "Yeah Yeah" (D. Ramirez vocal club mix)
3. "Yeah Yeah" (Electro club mix)
4. "Yeah Yeah" (D. Ramirez instrumental)

== Charts ==
=== Weekly charts ===
Chart (2006–2007)	Peak position
Australia (ARIA)	39
Belgium (Ultratop 50 Flanders)	30
Belgium Dance (Ultratop Flanders)	13
Europe (Eurochart Hot 100)	10
Finland (Suomen virallinen lista)	7
Hungary (Dance Top 40)	31
Ireland (IRMA)	43
Netherlands (Dutch Top 40)	17
Netherlands (Single Top 100)	13
Scotland Singles (OCC)	4
UK Singles (OCC)	2
UK Dance (OCC)	1
US Hot Dance Airplay (Billboard)	15

=== Year-end charts ===
Chart (2006)	Position
Netherlands (Single Top 100)	79
UK Singles (OCC)	66

== Certifications ==
Region	Certification	Certified units/sales
United Kingdom (BPI)	Gold	400,000^{‡}
^{‡} Sales+streaming figures based on certification alone.

== Release history ==
Region	Date	Format(s)	Label(s)	Ref.
United Kingdom	30 October 2006	12-inch vinyl; CD	Eye Industries	
Australia	22 January 2007	CD	Hussle	

== 2017 version ==
In 2016, American DJ Dave Audé released an updated version of "Yeah Yeah", this time billed as "Yeah Yeah 2017" and credited as Luciana and Dave Audé. This version reached number one on Billboard's Dance Club Songs chart the week of 25 February 2017.

In a 16 February 2017 interview with Billboard, Luciana explained how she and Audé came up with the idea to remake the song. "I feel very blessed and grateful right now. I am literally doing high kicks around my kitchen table as we speak! 'Yeah Yeah' is the track that started everything for me. I have always felt so passionate about it, so when Dave Audé said to me, 'Let's do a new 2017 version,' I knew it had to be right, and I think we nailed it. This No. 1 feels like the icing on the cake for me."
