= Olivia Holt =

American actress and singer-songwriter (born 1997)

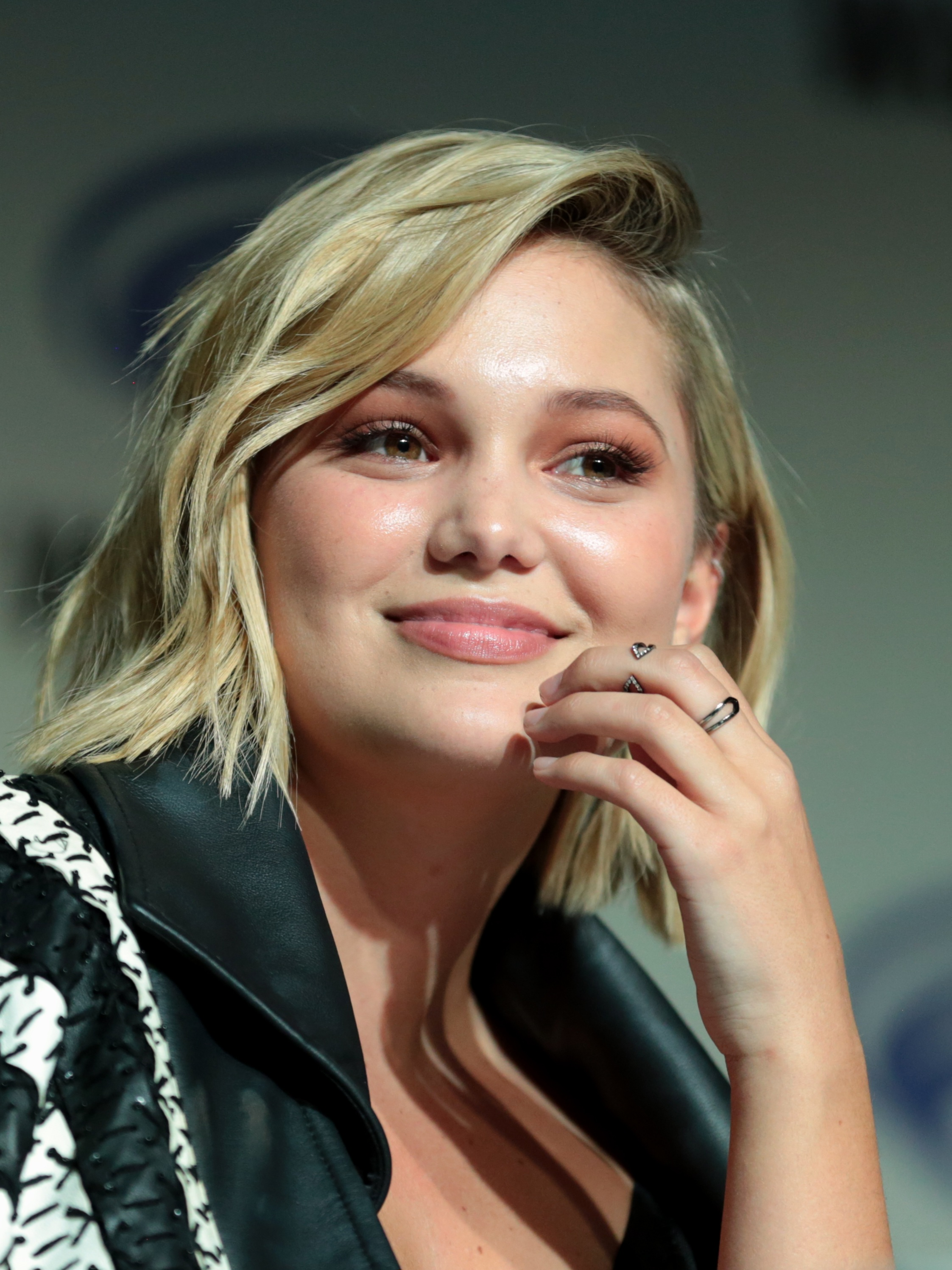
- Holt in 2018
- Born: Olivia Hastings Holt; August 5, 1997 (age 29); Germantown, Tennessee, U.S.
- Occupations: Actress; singer-songwriter
- Years active: 2009–present
- Works: Discography
- Musical career
- Genres: Dance-pop
- Instruments: Vocals; piano
- Label: Hollywood

Olivia Hastings Holt (born August 5, 1997) is an American actress and singer-songwriter. Her accolades include nominations for three Teen Choice Awards. She is known for portraying Kim Crawford in the Disney XD series Kickin' It, and Tandy Bowen / Dagger in the Freeform series Cloak & Dagger, the Disney XD series Spider-Man, and the Hulu series Runaways. In 2021, she portrayed Kate Wallis in Cruel Summer.

Holt had voice roles in the films Tinker Bell and the Legend of the NeverBeast (2014) and Gnome Alone (2017), and starred in the feature films Class Rank (2017), Same Kind of Different as Me (2017), and Status Update (2018). Her debut EP, Olivia, was released on Hollywood Records on July 15, 2016.

In 2023, Holt made her Broadway debut as Roxie Hart in Chicago. In May 2026, Holt joined the cast of Just in Time on Broadway as Connie Francis.

== Early life and education ==
Holt was born in Germantown, Tennessee, to Mark and Kim (née Peterson) Holt. She has two siblings. At age three, her family moved to Nesbit, Mississippi, where she grew up after briefly living in Memphis, Tennessee. In 2011, she moved to Los Angeles with her family. She was homeschooled for part of her life but graduated from Oak Park High School in 2015.

== Career ==
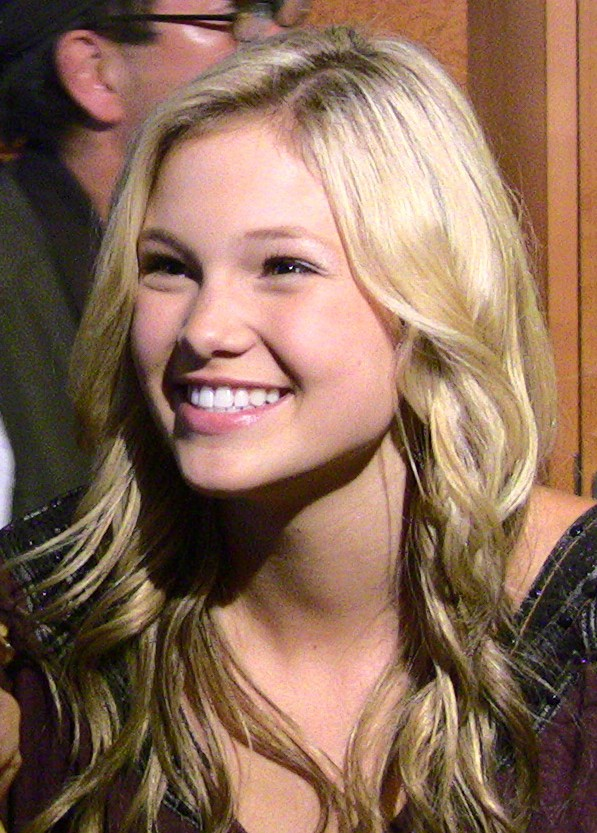
Holt in July 2011

=== 2007–2011: Rise to prominence ===
Holt began her acting career in local theater productions. She started appearing in television commercials at the age of 10, for products including Hasbro, Kidz Bop 14, Mattel, Bratz dolls, Littlest Pet Shop, and Girl Gourmet.

Possessing skills in gymnastics, Holt was cast in Disney XD's martial arts comedy Kickin' It, which premiered on June 13, 2011. She played the role of Kim Crawford in the series, as a main character in the first through third seasons, and as a special guest on three episodes in the fourth season.

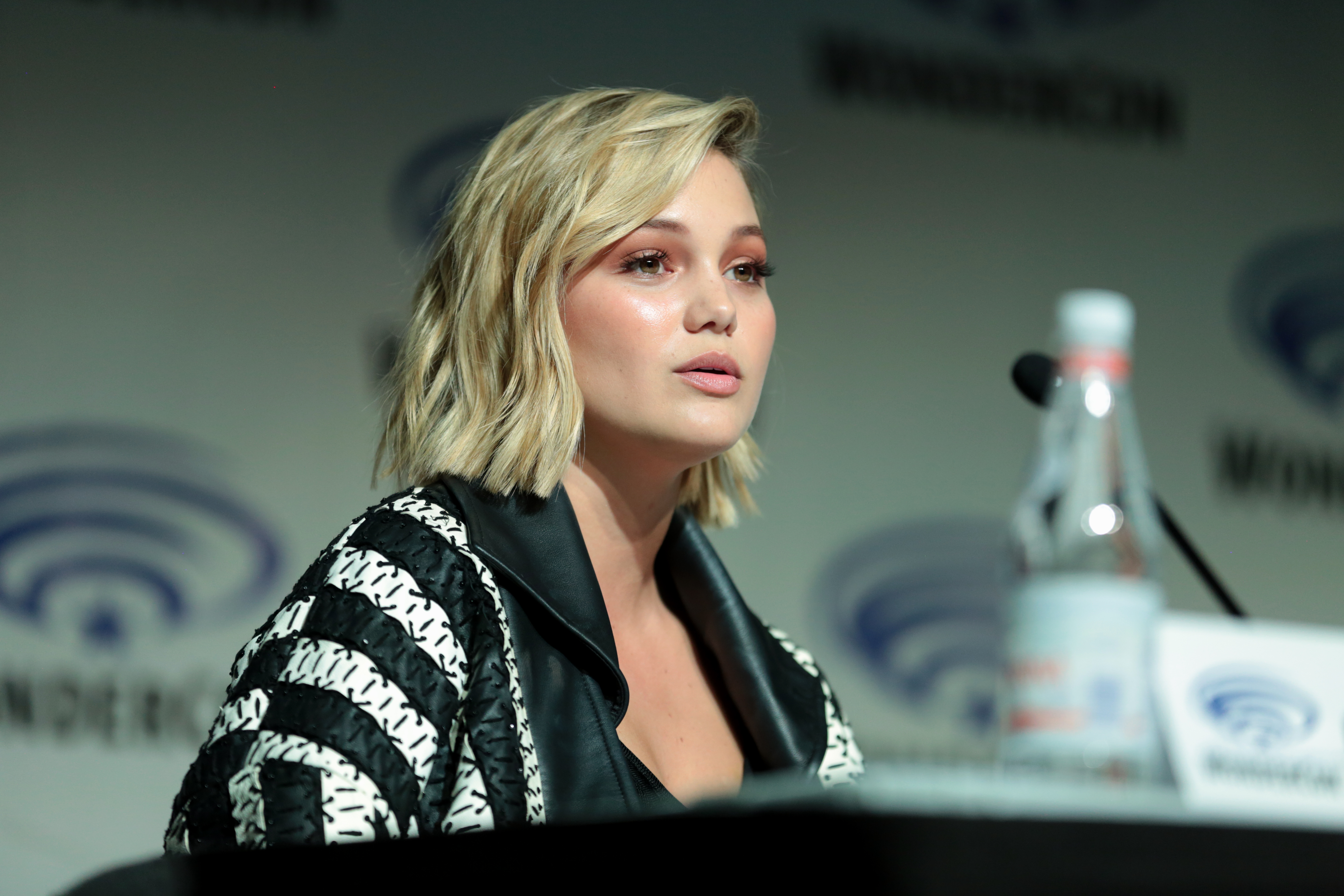
Holt attending WonderCon for Cloak and Dagger in 2018

=== 2012–2014: Departure from Kickin' It and I Didn't Do It ===
She starred in the 2012 Disney Channel Original Movie Girl vs. Monster, playing the lead character Skylar Lewis, a teenager who discovers that her family have long worked as monster hunters, and she is next in line. She left Kickin' It as a regular after its third season to star in the Disney Channel half-hour comedy series I Didn't Do It, which premiered on January 17, 2014. The series follows five friends, including Holt's character, Lindy Watson, a nerdy, athletic, social outcast. The series ended on October 16, 2015, after two seasons.

=== 2014–present: Career expansion ===
In November 2014, Holt joined the cast of the drama Same Kind of Different as Me, directed by Michael Carney. The film was released on October 20, 2017. From December 10, 2014, to January 4, 2015, Holt played Aurora in Sleeping Beauty and Her Winter Knight at Pasadena Playhouse. In November 2015, it was announced that Holt had been cast in a lead role in the indie comedy Class Rank, directed by Eric Stoltz. In May 2016, it was announced that she would star in Status Update, directed by Scott Speer, with filming to begin the following month in Vancouver, Canada. In January 2017, Holt was cast as Tandy Bowen / Dagger, one of the lead characters in the Freeform and Marvel Comics television series Cloak & Dagger. The series premiered in June 2018 and ran for two seasons until May 2019, after which it was canceled. Holt and co-star Aubrey Joseph reprised their roles in the animated series Spider-Man and a crossover episode in Runaways. Holt plays Kate Wallis on the series Cruel Summer, a psychological thriller set between 1993 and 1995 that premiered on Freeform on April 20, 2021. From April 10 to June 4, 2023, Holt played Roxie Hart in Chicago, marking her debut on Broadway.

== Other ventures ==
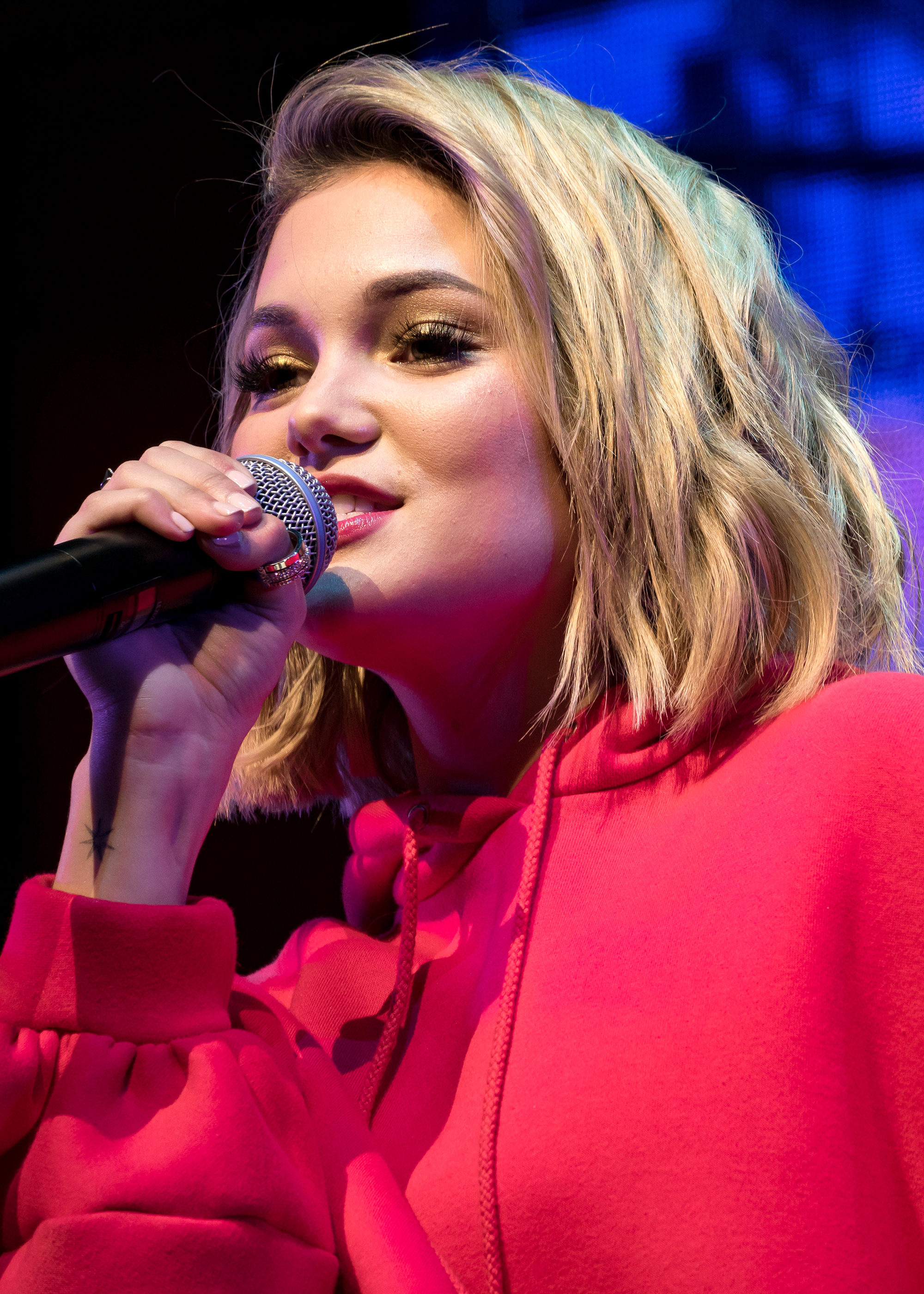
Holt in 2017

=== Musical career ===
Holt recorded three songs for the 2012 film Girl vs. Monster, in which she also starred. The songs were featured on the compilation Make Your Mark: Ultimate Playlist. She won a 2013 Radio Disney Music Award for Best Crush Song for "Had Me @ Hello", which was featured in the film. She also recorded a cover version of "Winter Wonderland" for the 2012 Disney Channel Holiday Playlist album. Her song "Carry On" was the theme song for the 2014 Disneynature film Bears.

In October 2014, Holt signed a record deal with Hollywood Records. Her debut single, "Phoenix", came out on May 13, 2016. The music video was released on June 23, 2016. Olivia, her debut EP, was released on July 15, 2016.

In 2016, Holt went on her first tour, the Rise of a Phoenix Tour, with Ryland Lynch, Isac Elliot and Forever in Your Mind. She and Forever in Your Mind also performed at the 2016 TJ Martell Family Foundation Day in Los Angeles on October 9, 2016.

In April 2017, she was picked as Elvis Duran's Artist of the Month appearing on NBC's Today show with Hoda Kotb and Kathie Lee Gifford performing her hit "History". Her single "Generous", which was written by Fransisca Hall and MoZella, was released on September 22, 2017. The song's music video was directed by Chris Applebaum. "Generous" reached number 1 on the Billboard Dance Club Songs chart. In 2018, she collaborated with Martin Jensen on "16 Steps" and with Nicky Romero on "Distance". The same year, she released the single "Bad Girlfriend".

Her 2020 single "Love U Again" featuring R3hab reached number 40 on the Billboard Hot Dance / Electronic Songs chart. It was followed by "Take Me Out of It" later that year. Through early 2021 she released the singles "Do You Miss Me" and "Love On You". She also covered the Smashing Pumpkins song "Today" for the TV series in which she stars Cruel Summer. On June 25, 2021, she released the single "Next", co-written with Meghan Trainor.

Holt was removed from Hollywood Records' roster in November 2021.

=== Screenwriting and directing ===
In August 2025, it was announced that Holt would return to Cruel Summer for its third season. She will serve as an executive producer in addition to reprising her season 1 lead role as Kate Wallis. The new installment, which is in development at Hulu and Freeform, marks a return to the series' original narrative roots after its second season followed an anthology format. Holt will serve as executive producer alongside Jessica Biel and Michelle Purple of Iron Ocean Productions, with Cori Uchida and Adam Lash serving as the new showrunners.

=== Endorsements ===
In 2013, Holt partnered with mobile gaming system maker PlayMG as a spokesperson and part owner, to help the company develop new versions of its app-based games. She was announced as a brand ambassador for Neutrogena in March 2016.

== Filmography ==
=== Film ===
Year	Title	Role	Notes	Ref.
2014	Tinker Bell and the Legend of the NeverBeast	Morgan (voice)		
2016	The Standoff	Amy Roberts		
2017	Class Rank	Veronica Krauss		
2017	Same Kind of Different as Me	Reagan Hall		
2018	Status Update	Dani McKenzie		
2018	Gnome Alone	Brittany (voice)		
2019	Trouble	Bella (voice)		
2023	Totally Killer	Pam Miller (young)		
2025	Heart Eyes	Ally McCabe		
2025	This Is Not a Test	Sloane Price		
2025	Jingle Bell Heist	Sophia Arbus		

=== Television ===
Year	Title	Role	Notes
2010	Disney XD's My Life	Herself	Disney XD reality show
2011–2015	Kickin' It	Kim Crawford	Main role (seasons 1–3); recurring role (season 4)
2012	Girl vs. Monster	Skylar Lewis	Television film
2013	Shake It Up	Georgia Jones	Episode: "My Bitter Sweet 16 It Up"
2014–2015	I Didn't Do It	Lindy Watson	Main role
2015	Ultimate Spider-Man	Petra Parker (voice)	Episode: "The Spider-Verse"
2015	Dog with a Blog	Jacqueline "Wacky Jackie" Bradley	Episode: "Stan Gets Married"
2015, 2017	Penn Zero: Part-Time Hero	Amber Briggs (voice)	3 episodes
2016	The Evermoor Chronicles	Valentina The Demi-Goddess of Love	2 episodes
2018–2019	Cloak & Dagger	Tandy Bowen / Dagger	Main role
2019–2020	Spider-Man	Tandy Bowen / Dagger (voice)	4 episodes
2019	Runaways	Tandy Bowen / Dagger	2 episodes
2019	Turkey Drop	Lucy Jacobs	Television film
2021–2023	Cruel Summer	Kate Wallis	Main role; also executive producer (season 3)
2024	Laid	Merci	3 episodes

=== Theater ===
Year	Title	Role	Venue	Notes	Ref.
2023	Chicago	Roxie Hart	Ambassador Theatre	Broadway debut	
2026	Just in Time	Connie Francis	Circle in the Square Theatre		

== Discography ==
Extended plays

- Olivia (2016)

Compilations

- In My Feelings (2021)
- Dance Like No One's Watching (2021)
- Remix Like You Mean It (2021)

== Awards and nominations ==
Year	Award	Category	Nominated work	Result	Ref.
2013	Radio Disney Music Awards	Best Crush Song	"Had Me @ Hello"	Won	
2013	Shorty Awards	Best Actress	Kickin' It	Nominated	
2018	Teen Choice Awards	Choice Female Hottie	Herself	Nominated	
2018	Teen Choice Awards	Choice Summer TV Star	Cloak & Dagger	Won	
2019	Teen Choice Awards	Choice Sci-Fi/Fantasy TV Actress	Cloak & Dagger	Nominated	
2021	Hollywood Critics Association TV Awards	Best Actress in a Broadcast Network or Cable Series, Drama	Cruel Summer	Nominated	
