= Tom Budin =

Australian electronic music producer and DJ

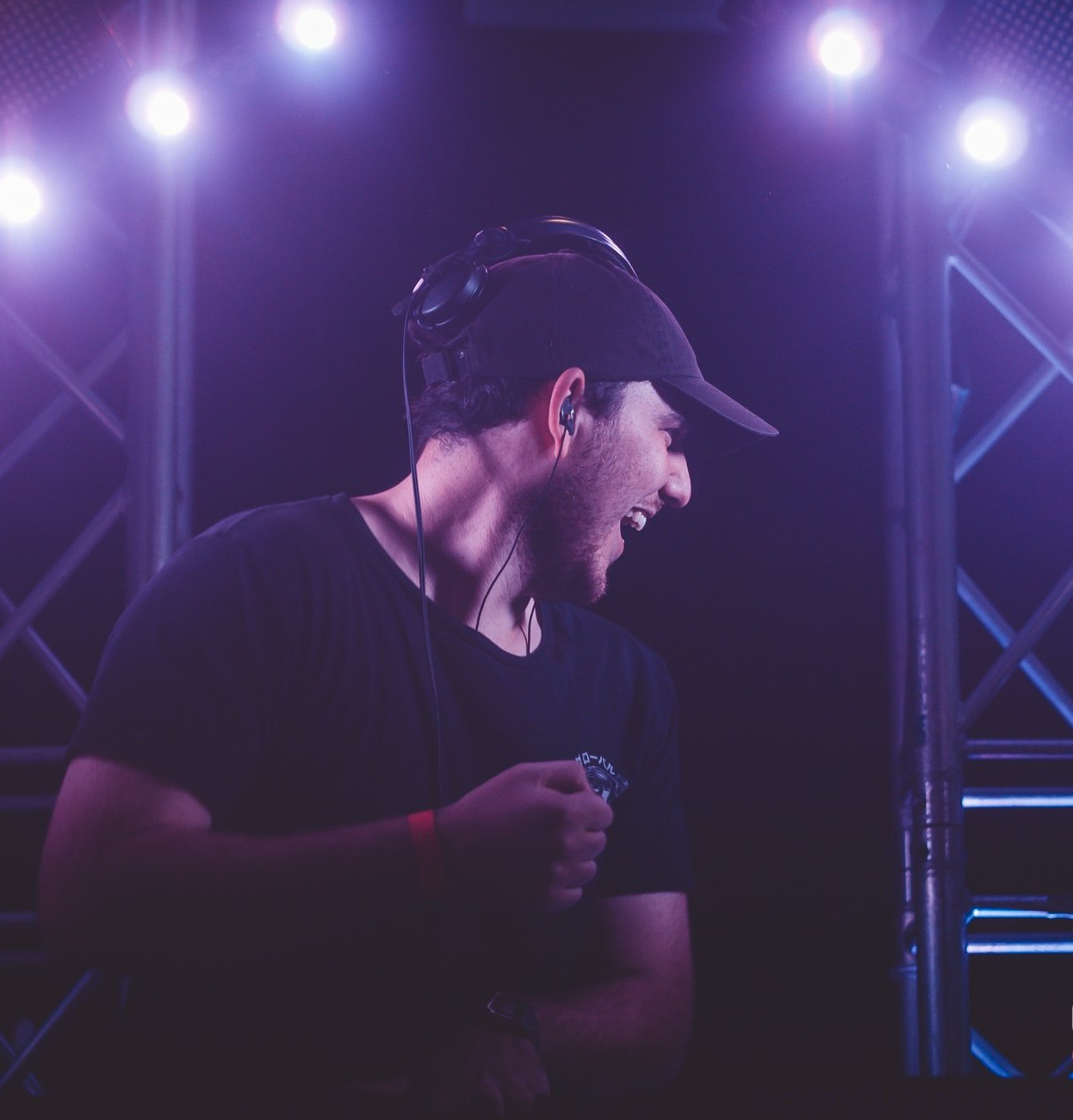

Background information
- Also known as: BDN
- Born: Sydney, Australia
- Genres: Future house; deep house; tech house
- Years active: 2015–present
- Labels: Sony; Spinnin'; Heldeep; OneLove; Ministry of Sound; Universal; Perfecto; Armada; Future House Music
- Website: tombudin.com.au

Tom Budin is an Australian DJ and record producer based in Sydney, Australia. He is known for officially remixing songs for musicians such as Lost Frequencies, Zedd, Britney Spears, G-Eazy and Timmy Trumpet.

== Career ==
Budin has released singles such as "Bad Vibe", "Heard Right", "Price on Love" and "Reckless" with collaborators WHTKD, J-Trick, Jack Wilby and Miles Graham respectively. In 2016, he released a song named "Mike Baird", which mocked and protested against the Sydney lockout laws, which were introduced in February 2014, two months before Baird became the Premier of New South Wales.

In 2018, his song "X with U" with British singer Luciana had charted on the Billboard Dance Club Songs chart at number one in the first week of the year.

== Discography ==
=== Singles ===
==== Charted singles ====
Title	Year	Peak chart positions
Title	Year	US Club
"X with U" (with Luciana)	2018	1

==== Other singles ====
Title	Year	Label
"Where's the Love"	2015	OneLove
"Cheeky Charlie"	2015	Ultra
"Into the Sun"	2015	Astrx
"Sizzle"	2015	Future House Music
"Too Far Gone" (with KYA)	2016	Perfecto
"Mike Baird"	2016	Ministry of Sound
"Work It Out" (with Higher Self)	2016	Future House Music
"We Are Done" (with Enya Angel)	2017	Self-released
"Freek"	2017	Astrx
"Price on Love" (with Jack Wilby)	2017	Armada
"Trompeta"	2017	Club Cartel
"On My Side" (featuring Jack Wilby)	2017	Armada Music
"Right Now" (with DLMT)	2018	Strange Fruits
"Shake That"	2019	Break It Down Music / NYX
"Hold On" (featuring Tylah Winyard)	2019	Mixmash Deep
"Truth Is"	2019	NYX / Future House Music
"Sugar's Delight"	2020	Universal Music Group
"Milk and Honey" (with Lucky Luke)	2020	Lithuania HQ
"Wandering Souls" (with Kopa)	2020	Future (Hexagon HQ)
"Let It Go" (featuring Xuitcasecity)	2020	OneLove
"All for Nothing"	2020	Selected.
"Love You Feel" (with Hi Motive)	2020	SPRS (Spinnin' Records)
"Down" (with Slvr featuring Anml Kngdm)	2020	Spinnin' Records
"Hot In The Club"	2021	Spinnin' Records

=== Remixes ===
Remixes adapted from Budin's SoundCloud page.

2013

- Zedd featuring Foxes – "Clarity" (Tom Budin Remix)

2014

- Jennifer Hudson featuring R. Kelly – "Its Your World" (Tom Budin Remix)
- The Bloody Beetroots featuring Peter Frampton – "The Beat" (Tom Budin Remix)
- Peking Duk – "Feels Like" (Tom Budin Remix)

2015

- Husky featuring Natalie Wood – "Next To You" (Tom Budin Remix)
- Lost Frequencies – "Are You With Me" (Tom Budin Remix)
- Rob Pix featuring Barry Tones – "Jack That" (Tom Budin Remix)
- Panzer Flower featuring Hubert Tubbs – "We Are Beautiful" (Tom Budin Remix)
- Tchami – "After Life" featuring Stacy Barthe (Tom Budin Remix)

2016

- Dave Audé and Luciana – "Yeah Yeah" (Tom Budin Remix)
- Offaiah – "Trouble" (Tom Budin Remix)
- Britney Spears featuring G–Eazy – "Make Me" (Tom Budin Remix)
- Joel Fletcher featuring Miracle – "Mufasa" (Tom Budin Remix)
- JDG and Samual James featuring Karra – "Dynasty" (Tom Budin Remix)

2017

- L'Tric – "The Way You Are" (Tom Budin Remix)
- Kronic and Leon Thomas – "Rendezvous" (Tom Budin Remix)
- Torren Foot – "Love Me" (Tom Budin Remix)
- Mashd N Kutcher featuring Park Avenue – "Pretend" (Tom Budin Remix)
- Timmy Trumpet and Qulinez – "Satellites" (Tom Budin Remix)
- Scndl – "Find My Way" (Tom Budin Remix)

2019

- Secret Spade – "Over You" (Tom Budin Remix)
- Young Bombs – "Starry Eyes" (Tom Budin Remix)
- Loui PL - "Right Here" (Tom Budin Remix)
- DJ Cruz - "No Problems" (Tom Budin Remix)

2020

- Lost Frequencies, Zonderling and Kelvin Jones - "Love To Go" (Tom Budin Remix)

2021

- Tchami featuring Stacy Barthe - "Rebirth" (Tom Budin Remix)
