= Generous (song) =

Single by Olivia Holt
- Released: September 22, 2017
- Recorded: 2016
- Genre: Pop; dance-pop
- Label: Hollywood
- Songwriters: Fransisca Hall; MoZella; James "Gladius" Wong
- Producer: Gladius

Olivia Holt singles chronology
"Paradise" (2017)	"Generous" (2017)	"Wrong Move" (2018)

Music video
- "Generous" on YouTube

"Generous" is a song by American singer and actress Olivia Holt. Released as a single on September 22, 2017, by Hollywood Records, it became her first number one on Billboard's Dance Club Songs chart in its March 17, 2018 issue.

== Music video ==
The music video, directed by Chris Applebaum, finds Holt strolling through the hallways of a swanky hotel. She enters a Staff Only closet and "borrows" a maid's uniform. Holt proceeds to frolic while cleaning several suites, helping herself to the food she discovers therein, while trying on numerous outfits found in the closets. She also treats herself to a bubble-bath, before changing back into her street clothes and departing the hotel via limousine.

The video premiered on Vevo and YouTube on September 26, 2017.

== Track listing ==
- Digital download and streaming
1. "Generous" - 3:51

Digital download and streaming (Martin Jensen Remix)

1. Generous (Martin Jensen Remix) - 2:48

Digital download and streaming (Marc Stout Remix)

1. Generous (Marc Stout Remix) - 4:28

Digital download and streaming (Madison Mars Remix)

1. Generous (Madison Mars Remix) - 3:04

== Charts ==
Chart (2018)	Peak position
US Dance Club Songs (Billboard)	1

== Release history ==
Country	Date	Format
Worldwide	September 22, 2017	Digital download
Japan	January 27, 2018	CD
