= Bodyrox =

English electro house music duo

- Origin: London, England
- Genres: Electro house
- Occupations: Disc jockeys, music producers
- Years active: 2005–present
- Members: Jon Pearn; Nick Bridges
- Website: http://www.bodyrox.co.uk/

Bodyrox are an English electro house music duo consisting of Jon Pearn (from Full Intention) and Nick Bridges.

== Biography ==
"Yeah Yeah", Bodyrox's first commercial single, was released in November 2006 on the "Eye Industries" label, featuring vocals by Luciana. "Yeah Yeah" reached No. 2 on the UK singles chart, also charting in a number of other countries including the Netherlands, Finland, Ireland, New Zealand and Australia. "Yeah Yeah" was used during a breakdancing competition in the 2007 Jamie Kennedy film Kickin' It Old Skool.

Bodyrox - Yeah Yeah (D.Ramirez Dub Mix)

The follow-up single to "Yeah Yeah" was "What Planet You On?". The music video featured Luciana in space. The song charted lowly across Europe, with the highest position being No. 54 in the UK, and was included in the video game FIFA 2008 and the UK cult film Tormented.

They also began producing tracks under a new moniker, Another Chance, beginning with "Sound of Eden" (2006) on Phonetic Recordings. The track was reworked the following year as "Everytime I See Her (Sound of Eden)" for major-label release on Positiva/EMI.

Since then Bodyrox have gone on to receive several nominations and awards including an Ivor Novello, and nominations two years in a row at the IDMA's in Miami and a MTV VMA nomination.

Further releases such as "Brave New World" and "Shut Your Mouth" were released in 2009.

In 2010, Bodyrox produced the theme tune for the film StreetDance 3D - a collaboration with N-Dubz called 'We Dance On' charting at #6 in the UK. In 2011, Bodyrox signed their debut album "Bow Wow Wow" to Transmission Records UK.

== Awards and nominations ==
Award	Year	Nominee(s)	Category	Result	Ref.
International Dance Music Awards	2007	"Yeah Yeah"	Best Breaks/Electro Track	Nominated	

== Discography ==
=== Albums ===
- 2007: Generationext
- 2012: Bow Wow Wow

=== Singles ===
Year	Title	Chart positions						
Year	Title	UK	AUS	NLD	IRL	FIN	BEL	NZ
2005	"Jump" (feat. Luciana)	—	—	—	—	—	—	—
2006	"Yeah Yeah" (feat. Luciana)	2	39	13	43	7	30	51
2008	"What Planet You On?" (feat. Luciana)	54	55	55	—	—	65	—
2008	"Brave New World" (feat. Luciana & Nick Clow)	—	—	—	—	—	—	—
2009	"Shut Your Mouth" (feat. Luciana)	—	—	—	—	—	—	—
2010	"Throw the Paint" (Bodyrox & Luciana)	—	—	—	—	—	—	—
2010	"We Dance On" (N-Dubz feat. Bodyrox)	6	—	—	9	—	—	—
2012	"Bow Wow Wow" (Bodyrox & Luciana feat. Chipmunk)	—	—	—	—	—	—	—
2012	"Rubba Dubba" (feat. Luciana)	—	—	—	—	—	—	—
