= Luciana (singer) =

English singer and rapper (born 1973)

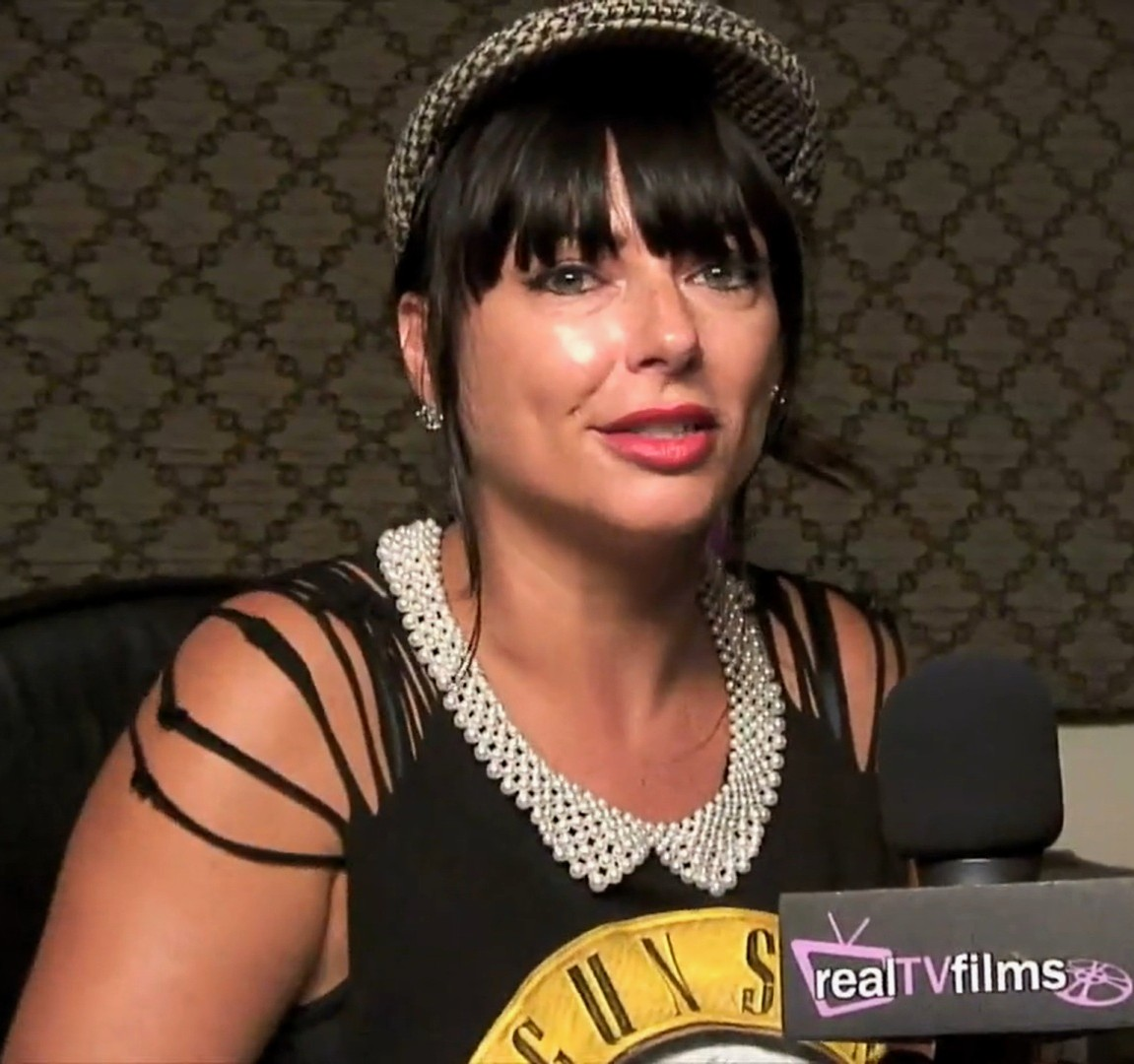
- Luciana in 2009

Background information
- Also known as: Isha Coco
- Born: Luciana Caporaso; 23 June 1973 (age 53); London, England
- Genres: House; electro house; punk rock; R&B; dance; funk rock
- Occupations: Singer; rapper; songwriter; record producer; painter; television presenter
- Years active: 1994–present
- Labels: Chrysalis (1994–1995); Violent Lips (2010–present)
- Website: luciana.com

Luciana Caporaso (born 23 June 1973), known mononymously as Luciana, is an English singer, rapper, songwriter, record producer, painter, and television presenter. She is of English and Italian heritage.

Caporaso has been credited as a songwriter on tracks performed by Britney Spears, Havana Brown, Kylie Minogue, Debbie Harry, and more.

== Career ==
=== 1994–2006: Acting and One More River ===
Caporaso made her acting debut in 1994, in the final episode on the short lived British TV series, Anna Lee. On the show, she sang the track "Sister Sister" and other incidental songs. Caporaso signed with Chrysalis Records (part of Global Radio) and, in 1994, released her first solo single, "Get It Up for Love", which was produced by Dancin' Danny D from the band D Mob. The follow-up single was "If You Want". The third and final release was a double A-sided single and her first ballad, "One More River", and was coupled with the pop-dance track "What Goes Around", all three songs charted in the UK Singles Chart and were featured on the album One More River. After the poor sales of her three solo singles, Caporaso parted company with Chrysalis Records.

In 1996, Caporaso replaced Jayni Hoy, in the band Crush. Their second album was the self-titled Crush (the first with Caporaso) was released in 1997 by Robbins Entertainment.

Caporaso performed with several other artists including Tomoki Hirata, on the single "Facing Up", released in 1997 on the Interstate label. In 1998, she appeared on the single, "I Don't Know if I Should Call You Baby", released by Electrik Funk Records.

Throughout 2006/7, just before her turning point success, Caporaso was a regular presenter on UK specialist television channel CharliiTV, alongside main presenter Hannah Sandling. The other hosts/"experts" were Desiree Skylark, Samanie Warren, Danielle Chapman, Jessica Reid, Toni Mickleburgh & Lily Vincent; Luciana played the role of the CharliiTV mechanic & technician, either alone or together with Samanie (starting from June 2006).

=== 2006–2010: Featured artist and collaborative success ===
After several sessions in the studio with production duo Bodyrox she featured on their single "Yeah Yeah" released by Eye Industries in 2006. The song went on to achieve mainstream success in the UK and across Europe, the song peaked 2 on the UK Singles Chart. This song had both a mainstream and sensual videoclip. The following year in 2007 she featured on Super Mal's song "Bigger Than Big". The song also achieved critical and commercial success in the dance industry and peaked number 19 on the UK Singles Chart.

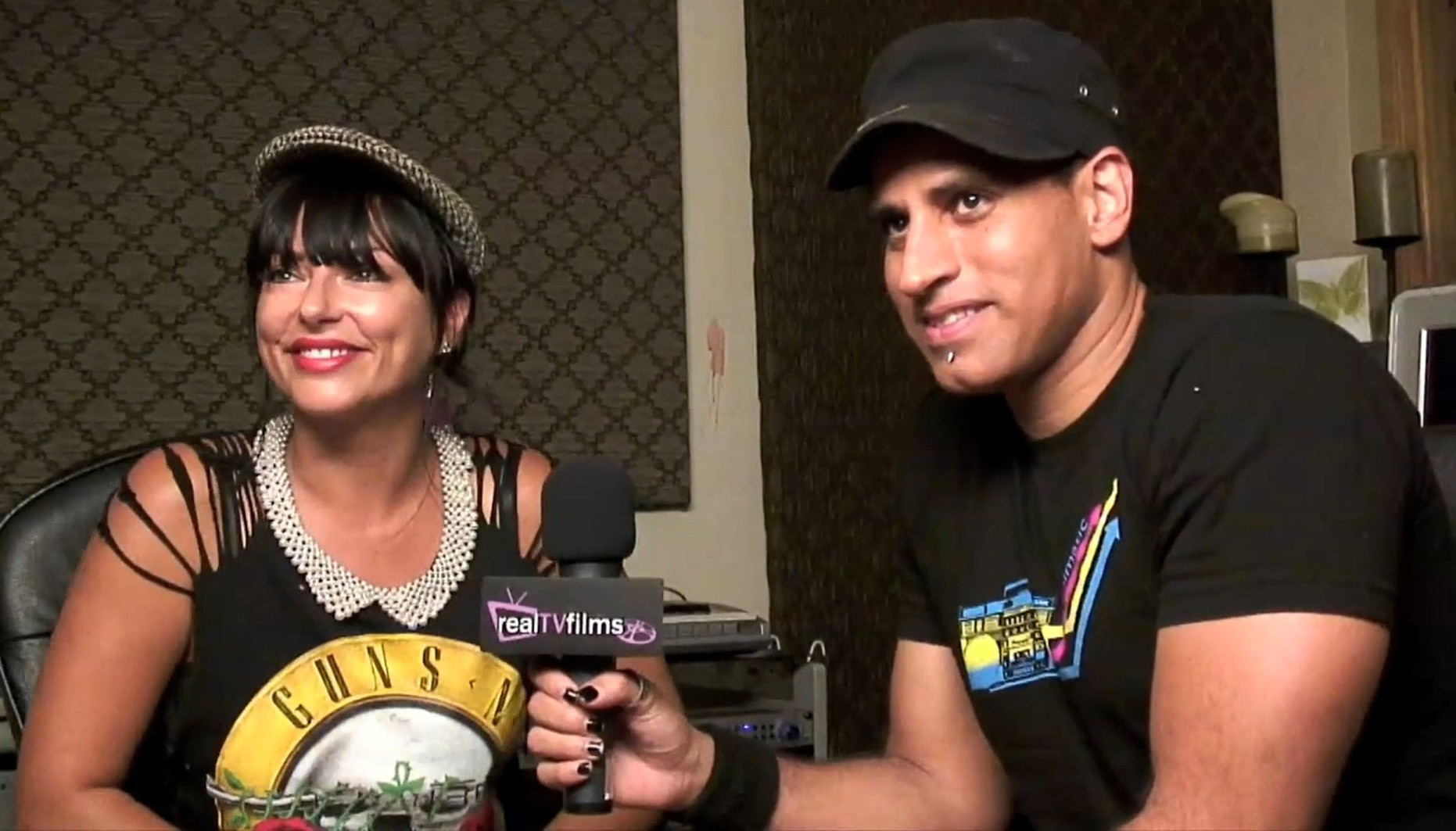
Luciana and Canadian music producer Richard Vission discuss their song "I Like That" in 2009

On 3 March 2008, the song "Come On Girl" by Taio Cruz was released, on which she featured. It peaked at number 5 in the UK Singles Chart, and appeared in the album Featuring Luciana, which was released later the same week. She guested on Gaydar Radio in November 2009 to perform her single "I Like That". The song attracted over fifteen million views on YouTube, and went on to peak at #3 on the Australian Singles Chart, knocking Lady Gaga and Beyoncé's "Telephone" off the number one spot the Australian Dance Chart. In July 2010, "I Like That" was certified Double Platinum in Australia, for sales in excess of 140,000 units.

In 2010, she and song writing partner Nick Clow, wrote "Cupid Boy", which appeared on Kylie Minogue's album, Aphrodite. In 2010, Caporaso recorded two tracks; "I Got My Eye on You" with Nari & Milani and Cristian Marchi, and "Figure It Out" with Dave Audé under the name Isha Coco.

=== 2011–present: EP and solo success ===
After moving to the U.S. in late 2010, Caporaso recorded a song titled "I'm Still Hot" which was produced by Dave Audé and was released on 19 April 2011 in the UK and 29 April 2011 in the US. In September 2011, a new version of "I'm Still Hot" which featured Betty White was released as a digital single on 22 September 2011 for a life settlement firm, The Lifeline Program. "I'm Still Hot" was played on ABC's Charlie's Angels and the CW's Ringer. The song peaked number one on the U.S. Hot Dance Club Songs chart, marking Luciana's first ever song to chart in the US as solo performer. The song also managed to chart in the top 40 on the Australian iTunes Chart. She also later collaborated with London rapper Professor Green on his album At Your Inconvenience.

She confirmed in an interview with SnapCackle that she would be working with producers Benny Benassi, deadmau5 and Dave Audé for her 6-track EP, which was expected in 2012, though was then most likely to see a release sometime in 2013. She later collaborated again with Richard Vission on the track "When It Feels Good" and claimed her fourth number one on the U.S. Hot Dance Club Songs chart.

In 2013, she released her fourth solo single "U B the Bass" which peaked at number 6 on the U.S. Hot Dance Club Songs chart and 88 in Australia.

July 2014 saw the release of Luciana's collaboration with DJ Hardwell and Joey Dale. The track was called "Arcadia" and was released on Revealed Recordings. In August of the same year, Luciana released, with KSHMR and Firebeatz, the song "No Heroes".

In 2016, Luciana and Aude teamed up to do an updated version of "Yeah Yeah", this time billed as "Yeah Yeah 2017" which reached number one on Billboard's Dance Club Songs chart the week of 25 February 2017, giving Luciana her sixth number one on this chart and Aude his record setting fourteenth. In a 16 February 2017 interview with Billboard, Luciana explained how she and Aude came up with the idea to remake the song: "I feel very blessed and grateful right now. I am literally doing high kicks around my kitchen table as we speak! 'Yeah Yeah' is the track that started everything for me. I have always felt so passionate about it, so when Dave Aude said to me, 'Let's do a new 2017 version,' I knew it had to be right, and I think we nailed it. This No. 1 feels like the icing on the cake for me."

== Other work ==
=== Visual art ===
Caporaso created her first collection of art work entitled Icon in 2004, which consisted of portraits of those individuals who have dominated popular culture for the past 50 years. Her original artwork combined photography, painting and silver and gold leaves. She has also produced both posters and album sleeves for record labels.

=== Bands ===
Caporaso formed the band Shooter and released the album ..And Your Point, which featured, "Life's a Bitch", released as a single in 1999 for the Dawson's Creek soundtrack. She formed another group called Portobella, who featured on MTV UK's reality series Breaking Point and, in 2004, released "Covered in Punk" with Island Records. The follow-up single, released in 2005, was "Viva La Difference". Portobella split up later in the year after little mainstream success.

== Television appearances ==
- 1994: Anna Lee – "Requiem" (as Lucy)
- 2004: TRL UK – with Portobella
- 2006-2007: CharliiTV – regular presenter, mechanic & repairwoman
- 2007: Virgin Media ID Channel – Yeah Yeah video
- 2008: Five News – What Planet U On? video

== Discography ==
- One More River (1994)
- Featuring Luciana (2008)
