= Marvel's young adult television series =

2017–19 superhero shows

- Cast members of Runaways and Cloak & Dagger promoting their crossover episode
- Genre: Superhero
- Based on: Characters published by Marvel Comics
- Starring: See below
- Country of origin: United States
- Original language: English
- No. of seasons: 5 (across 2 series)
- No. of episodes: 53

Production
- Executive producers: Alan Fine; Stan Lee; Joe Quesada; Karim Zreik; Jim Chory; Jeph Loeb
- Running time: 42–54 minutes
- Production companies: ABC Signature Studios; Marvel Television

Original release
- Network: Hulu; Freeform
- Release: November 21, 2017 – December 13, 2019

Marvel's young adult television series are two interconnected American television series in the young adult genre, based on characters that appear in publications by Marvel Comics. Produced by Marvel Television and ABC Signature Studios, they are set in the Marvel Cinematic Universe (MCU) and acknowledge the continuity of the franchise's films and other television series.

Cable channel Freeform ordered Cloak & Dagger, a youth-oriented superhero series starring Olivia Holt and Aubrey Joseph, from Marvel Television in April 2016 following years of development. Later in 2016, the similarly younger-skewing Runaways was ordered from Marvel Television by the streaming service Hulu. Both Freeform and Hulu are Disney-owned, and share the two series through a marketing partnership. Despite initially stating that the two series would be kept separate, Marvel Television announced a crossover between the two in August 2019 with Holt and Joseph appearing in the third season of Runaways. The studio first categorized the two series as an interconnected "YA" franchise at that time, with plans to continue having them crossover.

Runaways debuted in November 2017, with Cloak & Dagger following in June 2018. Both received positive reviews. Freeform ordered another young adult series from Marvel, New Warriors, but the project did not move forward. Cloak & Dagger and Runaways were both cancelled by their respective networks before the end of November 2019, and development on any further young adult series was halted a month later when Marvel Television was folded into Marvel Studios.

== Development ==
At San Diego Comic-Con 2011, Marvel Television head Jeph Loeb announced that a series based on the Marvel Comics characters Cloak and Dagger was in development at ABC Family. In April 2016, when ABC Family had been renamed to Freeform, the series received a straight-to-series order from ABC Signature Studios and Marvel Television. Freeform confirmed that the series would be set in the Marvel Cinematic Universe (MCU), and described it as a superhero love story, which Variety called "a seamless fit for Freeform" given the network's target audience of "Becomers" (the 14–34 age demographic).

In August 2016, Marvel Television announced that Hulu had ordered a new series based on the comics group the Runaways, and the studio had also begun development on a half-hour comedy series based on the New Warriors team, featuring the character Squirrel Girl. The latter series was being offered to cable networks and streaming outlets. Freeform ordered New Warriors straight-to-series in April 2017. The network's EVP of programming Karey Burke explained that they were interested in a Squirrel Girl series before they ordered Cloak & Dagger and before they knew that Marvel was developing the series. Burke felt Freeform was the best network for New Warriors after the success of Cloak & Dagger with young adults, and she added that both Freeform and Marvel wanted to "find the right characters that felt like they would speak directly to Freeform's audience." Burke said New Warriors and Cloak & Dagger would not be "particularly connected" given their different tones, but that a crossover between the two was possible.

Loeb confirmed in July 2017 that these series would all take place in the MCU alongside Marvel's other television series, as well as the franchise's films from Marvel Studios, but said there were no plans to have Cloak & Dagger crossover with New Warriors, nor have either of those series crossover across networks with the similarly youth-oriented Runaways. Loeb explained that Marvel wanted the individual series to find their footing before crossing over with other elements of the MCU, and felt "things that are happening in L.A. [where Runaways is set] are not exactly going to be affecting what's happening in New Orleans [where Cloak & Dagger is set.]" For Runaways, Loeb added that the characters would not be concerned with the actions of others in the universe, instead focusing on their own issues. This allowed showrunners Josh Schwartz and Stephanie Savage to deal with concepts such as superheroics and fantasy without explaining them to the audience, since they are already well established in the MCU, while still focusing on their own characters, which they described as "liberating". Loeb continued that Marvel was excited to "explore the world of the hero and how it affects someone who is trying to figure out who they are as opposed to already knows who they are and now their whole life has to take a left. That's the journey we're going on" with Cloak & Dagger, New Warriors, and Runaways.

New Warriors was no longer set to air on Freeform in November 2017, after the network did not have room in its schedule for the series and gave the project back to Marvel. Marvel was ultimately unable to find a new network for the series. Cloak & Dagger showrunner Joe Pokaski discussed a potential crossover between his series and Runaways in August 2018, saying "hopefully there's some karma we can fulfill there" since Cloak and Dagger appear in the Runaways comics. As part of a marketing partnership between Hulu and Freeform, Runaways aired on Freeform following its Hulu release while Cloak & Dagger was made available on Hulu after its Freeform broadcast. In August 2019, Marvel and Hulu announced that Cloak and Dagger would be appearing in an episode of Runaways' third season, with Loeb describing this as "the adventure everyone has been waiting for and we've only hinted at." Later that month, Loeb explained that Marvel categorized Runaways and Cloak & Dagger as its "YA", or "young adult", franchise. He said Marvel had wanted to cross the two series over since their first seasons, and this was possible now since Hulu became Disney controlled in May 2019 (Disney already owned Freeform). Loeb added that Marvel Television's push into the young adult genre was in response to Marvel Studios' films doing the same with Spider-Man.

Loeb hoped that the announced crossover episode would be "the first of many". However, Cloak & Dagger and Runaways had both been cancelled by the end of November 2019. The next month, Marvel Television was folded into Marvel Studios and stopped developing any new series.

== Series ==
Young adult television series from Marvel Television
Series	Season	Episodes	Originally released			Showrunner(s)
Series	Season	Episodes	First released	Last released	Network	Showrunner(s)
Runaways	1	10	November 21, 2017	January 9, 2018	Hulu	Josh Schwartz and Stephanie Savage
Runaways	2	13	December 21, 2018		Hulu	Josh Schwartz and Stephanie Savage
Runaways	3	10	December 13, 2019		Hulu	Josh Schwartz and Stephanie Savage
Cloak & Dagger	1	10	June 7, 2018	August 2, 2018	Freeform	Joe Pokaski
Cloak & Dagger	2	10	April 4, 2019	May 30, 2019	Freeform	Joe Pokaski

=== Runaways (2017–2019) ===
When six teenagers discover their parents are villains, collectively known as the Pride, they reluctantly unite to go against them. Later on the run from their parents, the teenagers live on their own and figure out how to stop the Pride, before learning there might be a mole hiding among them.

Runaways, based on the team of the same name, received an order for a pilot and additional scripts from Hulu in August 2016. The pilot was written by Josh Schwartz and Stephanie Savage, who also serve as executive producers and showrunners of the series. In February 2017, Marvel announced the Runaways actors, with Rhenzy Feliz as Alex Wilder, Lyrica Okano as Nico Minoru, Virginia Gardner as Karolina Dean, Ariela Barer as Gert Yorkes, Gregg Sulkin as Chase Stein, and Allegra Acosta as Molly Hernandez. Shortly after, they announced the Pride—the parents of the Runaways—actors, with Ryan Sands as Geoffrey Wilder, Angel Parker as Catherine Wilder, Brittany Ishibashi as Tina Minoru, James Yaegashi as Robert Minoru, Kevin Weisman as Dale Yorkes, Brigid Brannagh as Stacey Yorkes, Annie Wersching as Leslie Dean, Kip Pardue as Frank Dean, James Marsters as Victor Stein, and Ever Carradine as Janet Stein. Hulu officially ordered the series in May 2017, then for a second season in January 2018, and a third in March 2019; this was announced as the final season on November 8, 2019. Runaways was removed from Hulu and Disney+ globally on May 26, 2023, as part of Disney's cost-cutting measures.

A different version of Tina Minoru previously appeared in Doctor Strange, in a minor role as a Master of the Mystic Arts portrayed by Linda Louise Duan. The first season premiered on November 21, 2017. The second season, which was released on December 21, 2018, mentions Roxxon Oil and Wakanda. The third season, released on December 13, 2019, sees Olivia Holt and Aubrey Joseph reprise their roles as Tandy Bowen / Dagger and Tyrone Johnson / Cloak from the series Cloak & Dagger for a crossover episode, and sees the Dark Dimension featured, along with the Darkhold as it was portrayed on Agents of S.H.I.E.L.D..

=== Cloak & Dagger (2018–2019) ===
In New Orleans, Tandy Bowen and Tyrone Johnson, two teenagers from different backgrounds, acquire superpowers after a life-changing event that revolved around the collapse of an oil platform. As their relationship unfolds, they soon realize that their powers work better when they are together, but their feelings for each other make their already complicated world even more challenging. Tandy and Tyrone later work to solve the abductions of women run by Andre Deschaine while dealing with Detective Brigid O'Reilly's vigilante half Mayhem.

In April 2016, the ABC-owned network Freeform announced a straight-to-series order for Marvel's Cloak & Dagger, based on the characters of the same name, calling it their "first venture into the Marvel Cinematic Universe", and describing the show as a "superhero love story". In January 2017, Olivia Holt and Aubrey Joseph were cast as Tandy Bowen / Dagger and Tyrone Johnson / Cloak, respectively. Joe Pokaski serves as showrunner for the series. Filming for the series occurs in New Orleans. A second season was ordered on July 20, 2018. The series was canceled on October 24, 2019.

The first season, which premiered on June 7, 2018, sees Roxxon Oil featured, along with the Darkforce, which fuels Cloak's powers and was previously established in Agents of S.H.I.E.L.D. and Agent Carter, and makes reference to Tony Stark. The second season premiered on April 4, 2019. Both seasons also make direct references to the setting and characters of the Netflix shows Luke Cage, Iron Fist, and Daredevil.

== Cast and characters ==
List indicators

This section includes characters who have appeared in the series as a member of the main cast.

- A dark grey cell indicates the character was not in the series.
- A ^{G} indicates a guest appearance in the series.

Character	Runaways	Cloak & Dagger
Melissa Bowen		Andrea Roth
Tandy Bowen Dagger	Olivia Holt^{G}	Olivia Holt
James Connors		J. D. Evermore
Frank Dean	Kip Pardue	
Karolina Dean	Virginia Gardner	
Leslie Dean	Annie Wersching	
Francis Delgado		Jaime Zevallos
Molly Hayes Hernandez	Allegra Acosta	
Adina Johnson		Gloria Reuben
Otis Johnson		Miles Mussenden
Tyrone Johnson Cloak	Aubrey Joseph^{G}	Aubrey Joseph
Jonah	Julian McMahon	
Nico Minoru	Lyrica Okano	
Robert Minoru	James Yaegashi	
Tina Minoru	Brittany Ishibashi	
Brigid O'Reilly Mayhem		Emma Lahana
Chase Stein	Gregg Sulkin	
Janet Stein	Ever Carradine	
Victor Stein	James Marsters	
Liam Walsh		Carl Lundstedt
Alex Wilder	Rhenzy Feliz	
Catherine Wilder	Angel Parker	
Geoffrey Wilder	Ryan Sands	
Dale Yorkes	Kevin Weisman	
Gertrude "Gert" Yorkes	Ariela Barer	
Stacey Yorkes	Brigid Brannagh	
Xavin	Clarissa Thibeaux	

== Music ==
Score albums for young adult series
Title	U.S. release date	Length	Composer	Labels	Ref.
Runaways (Original Score)	January 26, 2018	44:57	Siddhartha Khosla	Hollywood Records; Marvel Music	
Cloak & Dagger (Original Score)	June 8, 2018	41:25	Mark Isham	Hollywood Records; Marvel Music	
Cloak & Dagger: Season 2 (Original Score)	May 24, 2019	49:04	Mark Isham	Hollywood Records; Marvel Music	

Compilation albums for young adult series
Title	U.S. release date	Length	Labels	Ref.
Runaways (Original Soundtrack)	January 12, 2018	50:08	Hollywood Records; Marvel Music	
Cloak & Dagger (Original Television Series Soundtrack)	June 8, 2018	41:31	Hollywood Records; Marvel Music	

== Reception ==
=== Ratings ===
Viewership and ratings per season of Marvel's young adult television series
Series	Season	Timeslot (ET)	Episodes	First aired		Last aired		Avg. viewers (millions)	Avg. 18–49 rating
Series	Season	Timeslot (ET)	Episodes	Date	Viewers (millions)	Date	Viewers (millions)	Avg. viewers (millions)	Avg. 18–49 rating
Cloak & Dagger	1	Thursday 8:00 pm	10	June 7, 2018	0.919	August 2, 2018	0.423	0.572	0.20
Cloak & Dagger	2	Thursday 8:00 pm	10	April 4, 2019	0.477	May 30, 2019	0.346	0.355	0.12

=== Critical response ===
Critical response of Marvel's young adult television series
Title	Season	Rotten Tomatoes	Metacritic
Runaways	1	85% (82 reviews)	68 (22 reviews)
Runaways	2	84% (25 reviews)	—N/a
Runaways	3	83% (12 reviews)	—N/a
Cloak & Dagger	1	89% (54 reviews)	68 (15 reviews)
Cloak & Dagger	2	86% (7 reviews)	—N/a

== Abandoned projects ==
=== New Warriors ===
Doreen Green / Squirrel Girl, Craig Hollis / Mister Immortal, Dwayne Taylor / Night Thrasher, Robbie Baldwin / Speedball, Zach Smith / Microbe, and Deborah Fields / Debrii, are superpowered young people with abilities very different from the Avengers, who want to make a positive impact in the world even if they are not quite ready to be heroes.

By the end of August 2016, Marvel Television and ABC Studios were developing a half-hour comedy series based on the New Warriors team and featuring Squirrel Girl. In April 2017, Freeform announced a straight-to-series order for Marvel's New Warriors, with Kevin Biegel serving as the series' showrunner and writing the first script. In July 2017, the cast was revealed with Milana Vayntrub starring as Doreen Green / Squirrel Girl and Derek Theler as Craig Hollis / Mister Immortal. In November 2017, it was announced that the series would no longer air on Freeform and was being shopped to other networks, with Marvel hoping to be able to air the series in 2018. By September 2019, the series had been unable to find a new broadcaster and was officially considered dead. The series was intended to consist of 10 episodes.

=== Other ===
After ordering New Warriors in April 2017, Burke said Freeform was "absolutely" interested in creating spinoff series for each of the characters on the New Warriors team, in a similar fashion to Marvel's Netflix television series, explaining that the characters Marvel chose for the team "are all really singular and could each carry the show that they're on. They're bound together ... for as long as we choose with this show but it's conceptually tailor-made for spinoffs." These potential spin-offs were still considered likely when Marvel began looking for a new broadcaster for New Warriors. Marvel Television was no longer developing any new series in December 2019.

== See also ==
- Marvel's ABC television series
- Marvel's Netflix television series
- Adventure into Fear
