= Cloak & Dagger season 1 =

Cloak & Dagger
- Season 1
- Promotional poster
- Showrunner: Joe Pokaski
- Starring: Olivia Holt; Aubrey Joseph; Gloria Reuben; Andrea Roth; J. D. Evermore; Miles Mussenden; Carl Lundstedt; Emma Lahana; Jaime Zevallos
- No. of episodes: 10

Release
- Original network: Freeform
- Original release: June 7 – August 2, 2018

Season chronology
- Next → Season 2

The first season of the American cable television series Cloak & Dagger, based on the Marvel Comics characters of the same name, sees teenagers Tandy Bowen / Dagger and Tyrone Johnson / Cloak discover their powers and learn that they work better together. It is set in the Marvel Cinematic Universe (MCU), sharing continuity with the films and other television series of the franchise, and is produced by ABC Signature Studios, Marvel Television, and Wandering Rocks Productions with Joe Pokaski serving as showrunner.

Olivia Holt and Aubrey Joseph star as Bowen and Johnson, with Gloria Reuben, Andrea Roth, J. D. Evermore, Miles Mussenden, Carl Lundstedt, Emma Lahana, and Jaime Zevallos also starring. Cloak & Dagger received a series order in April 2016, and Pokaski had joined the series as showrunner by that August. Holt and Joseph were cast in January 2017. Filming for the season took place from February to November 2017 in New Orleans, a change of setting for the characters from the comics in which they live in New York City. For the first season, Pokaski wanted to begin developing the relationship between the main characters to have them become friends first, rather than immediately jumping to them having a romantic relationship.

The first season began airing on June 7, 2018, running for 10 episodes on Freeform, and concluded on August 2. The season was praised for the interactions between Holt and Joseph, the use of its New Orleans setting, and the story, but was criticized for the pacing in the early episodes. The series was renewed for a second season on July 20, 2018.

== Episodes ==
No. overall	No. in season	Title	Directed by	Written by	Original release date	U.S. viewers (millions)
1	1	"First Light"	Gina Prince-Bythewood	Joe Pokaski	June 7, 2018	0.919
A young Tandy Bowen is picked up from ballet by her father Nathan. Meanwhile, a young Tyrone Johnson is dissuaded from stealing a car radio by his brother Billy, only for them to be chased by police officer Connors. The Roxxon Gulf platform off the coast of New Orleans explodes, causing Nathan and Tandy to crash into the ocean, where Nathan dies, and causing Connors to shoot Billy. Billy also falls into the ocean, and Tyrone jumps in to rescue him. Tandy and Tyrone are both affected by an energy force from the rig. Eight years later, Tandy earns money by stealing from rich people and avoids her mother Melissa, whose new lawyer boyfriend Greg is working on a case against Roxxon. At a party, Tyrone and Tandy bump into each other and realize that they had been together after the explosion; the encounter activates super-powers in each. Tandy is later assaulted by Rick, someone she had robbed, and accidentally stabs him with a dagger of light. Tyrone discovers that he can teleport after an encounter with Connors, now a detective.
2	2	"Suicide Sprints"	Alex García López	Joe Pokaski	June 7, 2018	0.750
Detective Brigid O'Reilly begins investigating the stabbing of Rick, scaring Tandy to the point that she attempts to leave town. Tyrone becomes obsessed with catching Connors, leading to him neglecting basketball practice. He attempts to make up for it at the suggestion of Father Delgado, but his teammates beat him up due to his absences. When Tyrone returns home, he apologizes to his mother Adina for his recent behavior and after touching her he sees her greatest fear: that she will lose him like she did Billy. When Tandy discovers that Melissa took her stolen money for drugs, she decides to rob a wedding to get the money she needs to flee. She is helped by her boyfriend Liam, but becomes scared of their relationship after seeing his greatest hope: that he wants to marry her. As they attempt to run away with the stolen money, O'Reilly arrests Liam. Tandy decides not to help him. Tyrone steals a gun from Adina and confronts Connors. As he is about to pull the trigger, Tyrone unintentionally teleports to the middle of a road where Tandy is driving.
3	3	"Stained Glass"	Peter Hoar	Story by : Ariella Blejer & Dawn Kamoche; Teleplay by : Peter Calloway	June 14, 2018	0.548
O'Reilly realizes that Tandy was responsible for stabbing Rick after deducing that he was trying to rape her. Tandy struggles to recover from crashing after swerving to avoid Tyrone, and arrives home to Melissa and Greg before O'Reilly arrives looking for her. Tandy sneaks away while Melissa and Greg talk to O'Reilly. Concussed, Tandy falls unconscious on a bus. Tyrone meets with his classmate Evita who takes him to voodoo priestess Auntie Chantelle for spiritual guidance. She has him bathe in various charms and spices to induce a fugue state. Both Tandy and Tyrone experience a surreal vision of each other, with Tandy attempting to stop Tyrone from taking revenge against Connors and Tyrone stopping Tandy from running away from her problems. Tandy meets with O'Reilly privately to explain her story, but the corrupt Connors has already closed the case. Tyrone decides to pursue a relationship with Evita. Later, he follows Tandy to the abandoned church in which she lives and confronts her about their shared connection.
4	4	"Call/Response"	Ami Canaan Mann	Christine Boylan & Marcus J. Guillory	June 21, 2018	0.606
Tyrone and Tandy talk about their personal lives and issues, explaining the visions that they saw of each other. Tyrone decides to falsify a stolen bike report, using his father Otis's bolt cutters, to get close to Connors; he ends up running out of the police station in fear. Otis discovers that Tyrone stole the bolt cutters and, fearful that Tyrone will become a criminal, takes him to see Big Chief Roland Duplantier of the Wild Red Hawks, a Mardi Gras tribe. Tyrone learns that Billy was designing a cloak for the next march and with Otis's approval he decides to complete it. Tandy discovers that Greg, who is already married, genuinely cares for Melissa and decides to help him research Roxxon. However, Melissa breaks up with Greg and when Tandy goes to see him again he is assassinated. Tandy tries to commit suicide by drowning, but changes her mind and uses her powers to survive. Tyrone returns to the police station and asks for O'Reilly while Tandy returns to Greg's office and takes the Roxxon files he had found as evidence to clear Nathan's name.
5	5	"Princeton Offense"	Ry Russo-Young	Niceole R. Levy & Joe Pokaski	June 28, 2018	0.509
O'Reilly agrees to investigate Connors as long as Tyrone stays away. Instead, he meets with Billy's friend Duane Porter hoping he will know something that can help. Tandy applies as an intern at Roxxon Gulf to get close to the executives there and sees that many of them wish to overthrow their boss. Tyrone plays in a basketball tournament, but during halftime he accidentally teleports to a Roxxon party that Tandy is attending. Together they discover that Roxxon Chief Executive of Risk Management Peter Scarborough was responsible for defaming Nathan. Tyrone teleports back just in time for the game to resume. As Tyrone plays, he picks up on the opposing players' fears and ends up throwing the game. Tandy meets Scarborough and uses her powers to see his greed. O'Reilly tries to get close with Connors by pretending to be loose with the law herself. After a night with Evita, Tyrone discovers that Duane is working with Connors to distribute drugs despite knowing that he killed Billy. Tandy meets Mina Hess, the daughter of Nathan's colleague Ivan.
6	6	"Funhouse Mirrors"	Jennifer Phang	J. Holtham & Jenny Klein	July 5, 2018	0.499
Evita and Auntie Chantelle begin studying Tyrone, believing that he is part of a "Divine Pairing" and that either he or Tandy will have to die to save New Orleans. Tyrone attempts to work for Duane, while Tandy becomes an intern for Mina. At Tandy's suggestion, Tyrone steals a bag of drugs that Duane is distributing and returns it to him to earn Duane's trust. Duane then agrees to involve Tyrone in the business, and takes him to meet with Connors, who arrives under the pretense of a drug bust. Connors is paired with O'Reilly, but is able to stall her. Connors confronts Duane about the bag of drugs being stolen, and sets up a situation in which O'Reilly is forced to shoot and kill Duane. This is witnessed by Tyrone, who Connors sees before he escapes. Tandy learns about Ivan and Nathan from Mina, but Mina realizes who Tandy is and leaves. Tandy discovers that Ivan has been in a catatonic state since the rig explosion but is unable to see into his mind. Mina forgives Tandy afterwards. Back at the church, Tandy finds a grieving Tyrone.
7	7	"Lotus Eaters"	Paul Edwards	Joe Pokaski & Peter Calloway	July 12, 2018	0.538
Tandy asks Tyrone to help her enter Ivan's mind. Together they are able to find him reliving the final moments of the rig explosion over and over again. He is optimistically passive as he cannot remember how much time has passed, nor can he remember his name or Mina. The other employees on the rig had been infected by the strange energy that Roxxon was searching for, and appear in Ivan's memories as psychopathic killers. Ivan believes that the explosion can be stopped from the core, but was unable to do so in real life and has still been unsuccessful in his attempts since. Tyrone is able to do so with his powers, but it does not work due to being Ivan's mind. Tandy discovers that her father Nathan had called Ivan moments before the explosion, and takes the opportunity to talk to him in each loop. Tyrone convinces her that it is not actually her father, and they help Ivan reach the core after reminding him of Mina. Ivan awakens with no memory of Tandy or Tyrone, and is reunited with Mina. Tandy and Tyrone later listen to a recording of Billy together.
8	8	"Ghost Stories"	Alex García López	Christine Boylan & Jenny Klein	July 19, 2018	0.401
Ivan tells Tandy that Nathan hid evidence to clear their names in a safety deposit box. It is the eighth anniversary of the rig explosion, and she plans to remember her father with Melissa later on. First, she visits Tyrone and his family who are struggling with the anniversary of Billy's death, and steals an access card for Roxxon from Adina. She uses it to enter Roxxon and confront Scarborough with Nathan's evidence, and he offers to pay her for it. She refuses, wanting to clear her father's name instead. Tyrone completes Billy's cloak, and then uses it to better control his powers. This allows him to "haunt" Connors, pretending to be Billy's ghost, which leads to him confessing to the murder. O'Reilly arrests Connors. Tyrone joins Tandy and Melissa for their memorial, but when the three hold hands Tandy and Tyrone enter Melissa's memories and see that Nathan was abusive toward her. Upset, Tandy accepts Scarborough's bribe. To celebrate Connors' arrest, O'Reilly visits her new boyfriend and fellow police officer Fuchs, but she finds his dead body stuffed in a fridge.
9	9	"Back Breaker"	Jeff Woolnough	Niceole R. Levy & Peter Calloway	July 26, 2018	0.531
Tyrone's parents are informed of Connors' arrest and suspension, but neither react to it. Tyrone lashes out at school, leading to a confrontation with Father Delgado in which Tyrone sees the priest's fear of his drinking addiction and how it either killed a young child once, or could in the future. After learning about her father's abusive behavior, Tandy becomes addicted to stealing the hopes of others, including Mina's. She attempts to steal Liam's hope, but is stopped by Tyrone. She confronts him at school, where Evita realises that Tandy is the other half of the Divine Pairing, whom Auntie Chantelle believes will be needed soon due to Roxxon's drilling. Drunk while mourning Fuchs, O'Reilly attacks Connors but he beats her in front of her colleagues. Tandy discovers that Liam has stolen the money she got from Scarborough, and then finds Melissa being held at gunpoint by Greg's killer. Adina tells Tyrone that she just wants to protect him from the police, but now he is framed for Fuchs' murder. Mina sees an energy leak infect several Roxxon workers.
10	10	"Colony Collapse"	Wayne Yip	Joe Pokaski	August 2, 2018	0.423
Tandy saves Melissa and Mina, with the latter helping confront Scarborough. He reveals where the core for the city-wide system is, and Tandy leaves his mind trapped in a similar state to what Ivan's had been. Tyrone and O'Reilly are arrested, but the infection spreads to the precinct and the police officers begin fighting each other. Tyrone teleports to Tandy in time to stop an infected Mina, before the pair are told of their fate as the Divine Pairing by Evita. O'Reilly helps fend off infected civilians so Tandy and Tyrone can reach the core, but is shot and apparently killed by Connors. Her body is exposed to the energy before he pushes it into the ocean. Connors is then absorbed into the Darkforce emitted from Tyrone's cloak. Inside the core, Tandy and Tyrone are able to absorb the leaking energy and release it safely into the sky, saving the city and curing all those infected. Roxxon is blamed for the crisis. Tandy moves back in with Melissa while Tyrone moves into her church, as he is still wanted by the police. A mutated O'Reilly later emerges from the water.

== Cast and characters ==
=== Main ===
- Olivia Holt as Tandy Bowen / Dagger
- Aubrey Joseph as Tyrone "Ty" Johnson / Cloak
- Gloria Reuben as Adina Johnson
- Andrea Roth as Melissa Bowen
- J. D. Evermore as James Connors
- Miles Mussenden as Otis Johnson
- Carl Lundstedt as Liam Walsh
- Emma Lahana as Brigid O'Reilly
- Jaime Zevallos as Francis Delgado

=== Recurring ===
- Wayne Péré as Peter Scarborough
- Noëlle Renée Bercy as Evita Fusilier
- Lane Miller as Kenneth Fuchs
- Angela Davis as Chantelle Fusilier
- Ally Maki as Mina Hess
- Tim Kang as Ivan Hess

== Production ==
=== Development ===
In April 2016, the series received a straight-to-series order for Freeform from ABC Signature Studios and Marvel Television, with the search for a showrunner underway. The order consisted of 10 episodes. By August 2016, Joe Pokaski had signed on to the series as showrunner and executive producer, with Jeph Loeb and Jim Chory also serving as executive producers. Alan Fine, Stan Lee, Joe Quesada, and Karim Zreik also serve as executive producers. In establishing the "look and feel of the show", Pokaski "wanted something that felt intimate and uncertain", something he hoped the pilot director would convey. Gina Prince-Bythewood was close to the top of Pokaski's list, because he had recently seen Beyond the Lights, which was direct by Prince-Bythwood, and felt it had a similar style that fit his vision for the series. Prince-Bythwood read the script, expecting to hate it, but was surprised by it, feeling it was "a story about two messed-up individuals finding each other." She was hired, and Pokaski credited her for "a lot of our look and feel, a lot of our performances — even just making Aubrey and Olivia comfortable and act in a way that feels real and raw".

=== Writing ===
Writing for Cloak & Dagger began by the end of August 2016, with Pokaski re-writing his initial script that November. Olivia Holt felt the season explored "the story of what a white female is going through in 2018 and what a black young male is going through in 2018. We see these characters unfold into themselves in the most complex ways". Pokaski created an 80-page "bible" for the first season, feeling he followed a good portion of it, while still allowing himself and the writers the ability to deviate from it if better story points arose. Pokaski was pleased with the diversity of the writers for the season, as they could "represent things that I don't understand". With a majority of black writers, they could "really talk about issues" such as "the story of two young men, driving through New Orleans and talking about their reality and how justice is for other people", while the women writers "really keep [Pokaski] honest as to how to push the envelope and tell the story of a young woman who's a superhero".

Pokaski spoke about the differences in Cloak and Dagger's origin story from the comics, calling the original stories "fantastic" and progressive "for the time [but] they were a little bit sexist and racist once you got into it, for now. What we tried to do was deconstruct it and make it about Tandy and Tyrone, understand who they were", to tell "the right story for now". However, Pokaski felt "there is a nobility to the fact that [the original comic writers] wrote [the comics] to show there were homeless children and people doing drugs and things like that. There are some different things that we're trying to shine a light on with our show, but we're in the same spirit hopefully." He also felt Loeb's idea of having the duo live in New Orleans, opposed to New York City as in the comics, was a "great idea". To research New Orleans, Pokaski relied on books, consultants, as well as some of the writers in the season. For example, Marcus Guillory "was a fount of information, as to not only the music and the food, but the vodon and the [Mardi Gras] Indians" while Nicole Levy "grew up with a lot of family [in New Orleans] so she had been down there a lot". The various aspects of vodon inspired the "Divine Pairing" mythology introduced in the season. While researching vodon, which has "religious aspects taken from Africa and the Caribbean to America and hidden under a Christian and Catholic auspice," the writers learned the religion has a duality to it. Pokaski explained, "If you look at some of the Loa in Voodoo, there are some pairings like Baron Samedi is a legend to be married to Maman Brigitte. There are all these pairings you find within. At every point it was fascinating to learn and it seemed like it was destined to become part of the Cloak & Dagger mythology."

Pokaski did not want to rush the romantic relationship between the duo, insisting that the season is "more about finding your best friend... this show is about 'There's exactly one person who understands me.'" The season does hint at the pair becoming a romantic couple, with Pokaski and the writers being "excited to tease what will happen in their future". Structurally for the season, Pokaski felt the first four episodes was the season's first act, where viewers get to understand Tandy and Tyrone individually, the next three "are about them coming together comprehensively, not only as a team, but as best friends", before concluding with the last three episodes.

The killing of officer Fuchs by having him appear in a refrigerator was meant to "throw [the Women in Refrigerators trope] on its head", according to Pokaski, adding the idea was brought about "so we can at least start a conversation about how we can all be slightly less lazy writers." "Lotus Eaters", the episode which employs the time loop concept, was conceived as "a special departure" episode, similar to ones that happened on Buffy the Vampire Slayer. Pokaski and Peter Calloway, the episode's writers, "started just riffing on an idea of Groundhog Day meets Deepwater Horizon, and the idea of a man trapped in his own brain." Having Tandy talking to her dad on the phone "allowed her to expose how lonely she was and how much she missed her father", while the episode had Tyrone "embracing her and being positive to her and helping her out of the situation".

=== Casting ===
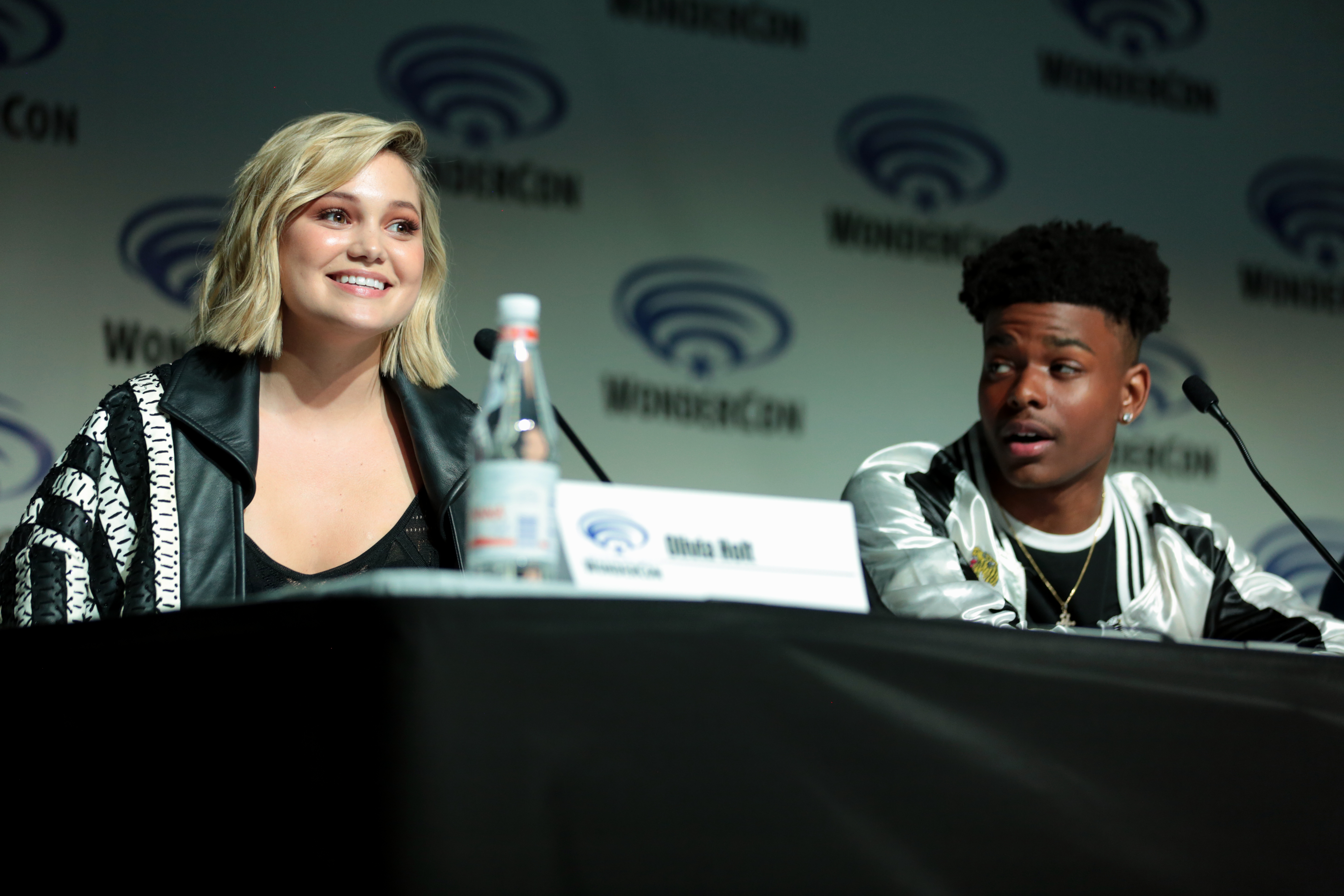
Olivia Holt and Aubrey Joseph at WonderCon 2018 promoting Cloak & Dagger

In January 2017, Olivia Holt and Aubrey Joseph were announced as portraying Tandy Bowen / Dagger and Tyrone Johnson / Cloak, respectively. Gina Prince-Bythewood, the director of the first episode, called the casting process "really, really tough... it was three days before we were supposed to leave [to begin filming] and we didn't find [actors for the pair]. People started getting willing to settle and the people that were on the table were 27, 28. They felt grown and it didn't feel right for the show. Then Aubrey and Olivia walked in the door, and they had such great chops individually". Rachel Ryals and Maceo Smedley III portrays a young Tandy and Tyrone, respectively.

The following month, Andrea Roth was cast as Melissa Bowen, Tandy's mother; Gloria Reuben and Miles Mussenden were cast as Tyrone's parents, Adina and Otis Johnson; and Carl Lundstedt and J. D. Evermore were cast as Liam Walsh and James Connors, respectively. Emma Lahana and Jaime Zevallos also star as Brigid O'Reilly and Francis Delgado.

Noëlle Renée Bercy recurs in the season as Evita Fusilier, along with Wayne Péré as Peter Scarborough, Lane Miller as Fuchs, Angela Davis as Chantelle, who Pokaski described as "a modern-day incarnation of priestess Marie Laveau", Ally Maki as Mina Hess, and Tim Kang as Ivan Hess. Other guest stars include Marqus Clae as Billy Johnson, Mike Donovan as Rick Cotton, Dalon J. Holland as Duane Porter, Andy Dylan as Nathan Bowen, Gary Weeks as Greg Pressfield, Dalton E. Gray as Benny, Luray Cooper as Big Chief Roland Duplantier, Gralen Banks as Choo Choo Broussard, and Vanessa Motta as a professional killer. James Saito was also announced to appear in the series as Bernard Sanjo, Tyrone's unusual friend who is an emotional cornerstone in his life but ultimately did not appear in the series. Stan Lee makes a cameo appearance through an on-set painting. An alternate cameo considered was having a papier-mâché Mardi Gras head of Lee appear in the final episode during the Mardi Gras warehouse confrontation.

=== Filming ===
Filming for the season had begun by February 8, 2017, in New Orleans, under the working title Shadows. In December 2016, Disney planned to spend $11.2 million, of a total $42 million budget for the season in Louisiana, over an 86-day filming period. Filming on the pilot episode wrapped on February 24, 2017. Photography on the remainder of the season resumed in New Orleans on July 24. Filming locations included the Le Pavillon Hotel. The church where Tandy lives was filmed in a real church that was being renovated into a music venue during the pilot. By the time filming resumed for the season, the renovation had progress to where the series could no longer film at the location, so production designer Meghan Rogers rebuilt the set on a soundstage from dimensions and pictures taken from the church.

Filming officially wrapped on November 2. Tami Reiker served as cinematographer for the first episode. Because of other commitments, she did not plan to continue with the series, and, along with Prince-Bythewood, recommended Cliff Charles to replace her, who served as cinematographer on the remaining episodes. The season features many hand-held camera shots that established the "look and feel" of the series, in part because Pokaski "didn't want to wait for a dolly track to be laid".

=== Music ===
Mark Isham composed the music for the season, having previously collaborated with Prince-Bythewood on the films The Secret Life of Bees and Beyond the Lights. Isham described the series as "extremely character driven" and focused on the difficult childhoods of the title characters, so his score is "dark, but also young enough to keep up with the teenage cast", with a "jazzy New Orleans flair." An album featuring Isham's score was released digitally by Marvel Music and Hollywood Records on July 6, 2018:

Cloak & Dagger (Original Score)
No.	Title	Length
1.	"Before and After"	1:31
2.	"Waiting"	2:16
3.	"Disasters"	3:45
4.	"Tandy's House"	2:12
5.	"Touch or Not Touch"	2:15
6.	"Newfound Powers"	4:09
7.	"There Is No We"	1:56
8.	"Marie Laveau"	1:35
9.	"Face This"	1:59
10.	"Money Trawl"	1:25
11.	"Remembering"	2:06
12.	"Cloak"	3:37
13.	"Telltale Heart"	3:20
14.	"Check Your Privilege"	1:52
15.	"Tandy Talks"	3:10
16.	"Breakdown"	1:00
17.	"Suicide"	1:30
18.	"Dads"	4:05
19.	"Eight Years Ago"	2:16
20.	"Darkness"	3:20
21.	"Hopes"	1:31
22.	"What About the Kids"	1:57
23.	"Call to Action"	3:03
24.	"One Lives, One Dies"	3:08
25.	"Hoodie"	2:21

Additionally, multiple songs are featured throughout the season. Some of these were collected and released on a digital soundtrack album on June 8, 2018, again by Marvel Music and Hollywood Records. The release includes series' star Olivia Holt's cover of the song "Come Sail Away".

Cloak & Dagger (Original Television Series Soundtrack)
No.	Title	Artist(s)	Length
1.	"Come Sail Away"	Olivia Holt	5:38
2.	"Arise"	The Siege	2:11
3.	"Leave the Light On"	Overcoats	3:18
4.	"Trigger"	Ruelle	3:15
5.	"Quiet"	MILCK	3:22
6.	"Get What I Came For"	The Phantoms	2:50
7.	"Run Wild"	Thutmose & NoMBe	2:41
8.	"To The Grave"	Bea Miller & Mike Stud	3:56
9.	"Home"	morgxn	3:35
10.	"It's a Crying Shame"	The Roues Brothers	2:23
11.	"Harlem"	The Cathedrals	4:05
12.	"Ending"	Isak Danielson	4:10

=== Marvel Cinematic Universe tie-ins ===
Roxxon Gulf, a division of the Roxxon Corporation company that has been featured throughout the MCU, is seen in the season. The Darkforce dimension which fuels Cloak's powers was previously established in Agents of S.H.I.E.L.D. and Agent Carter. Pokaski stated that "There are at least a dozen Easter eggs in the first season that Marvel approved, and a few more that I snuck in there." O'Reilly discusses formerly working in Harlem and her friend Misty Knight in the series, while her move to New Orleans is mentioned by her former New York colleagues in the second season of Luke Cage. Loeb noted the Luke Cage references were "not by mistake", with the potential for them to become something more, such as having Simone Missick, who portrays Misty Knight, appearing in the series. Tony Stark and Danny Rand are also mentioned in the series.

== Marketing ==
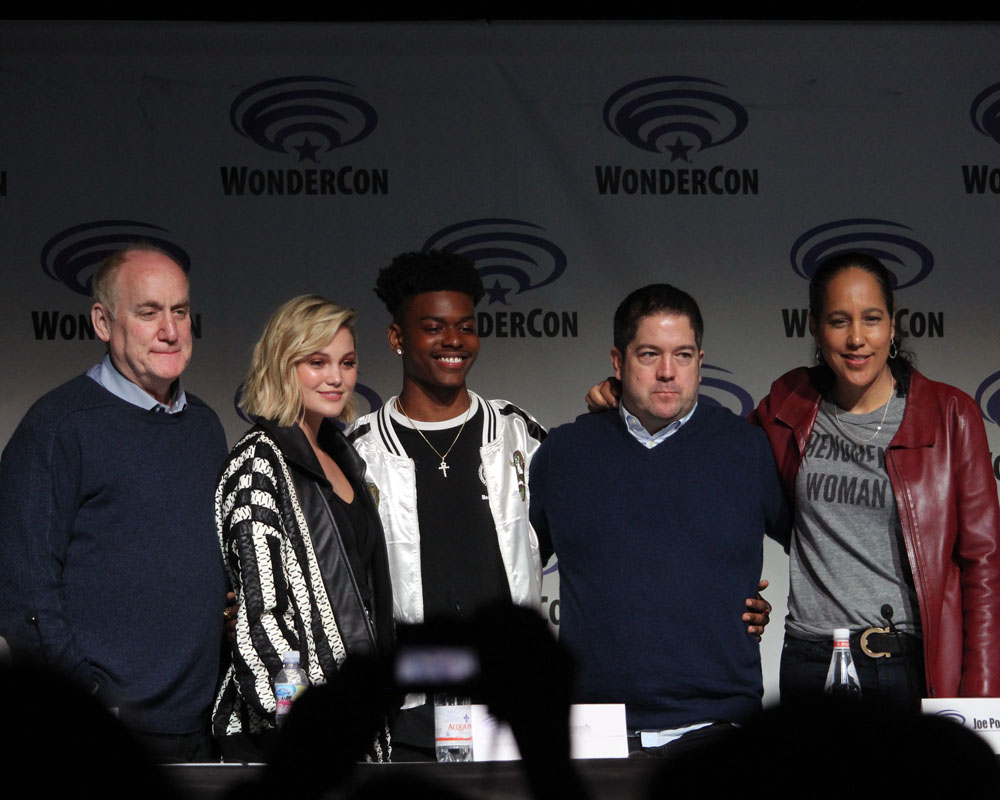
Loeb, Holt, Joseph, Pokaski, and Prince-Bythewood at WonderCon 2018 promoting Cloak & Dagger

The first trailer for the season was released on April 19, 2017, ahead of Freeform's 2017 upfront presentation. The A.V. Club's William Hughes described the trailer as dark and moody, "the grimmest entry we've seen from Marvel TV to date." He felt that Joseph and Holt "look like they're game to capture the necessary 'You're the only person on Earth who gets me' vibe" that is central to the comic characters. Ben Pearson at /Film said the trailer looked "dangerously cheesy", and as "over the top" as other Freeform shows. He added, "It also doesn't look very much like other Marvel shows. So if all else fails, at least this will be an experiment to see how well Marvel's products can transition within genres and play to different audiences." Rob Cave for Comic Book Resources felt setting the series in New Orleans "gives audiences a glimpse of part of the Marvel Universe, and of America, that is seen on screen far less often than the mythical realms of Asgard or the sci-fi cities of Xandar Prime, let alone the over-exposed metropolises of New York and LA. The move also gives Cloak and Dagger's story its own space, far from the clutter and the clamor of the multitudes of superheroes already established across" the MCU.

In August 2017, exclusive clips from the season were shown at the Edinburgh International Television Festival. The series was part of Freeform's "activation zone" at New York Comic Con 2017. Holt, Joseph, Pokaski, and Prince-Bythewood appeared at South by Southwest 2018 on March 11 at the Central Presbyterian Church in Austin, Texas, as well as at WonderCon 2018 on March 23, to discuss the season and screen the first episode. A trailer was released on March 20, 2018. In July, Holt, Joseph, Lahana, Maki, Pokaski, and Loeb appeared at the 2018 San Diego Comic-Con to promote the season and present an exclusive look at the final two episodes of the season which had yet to air. The series also had two different interactive activations for the convention at "The Experience" at Petco Park, including a bungee experience that propels participants backwards, replicating the force of Tyrone and Tandy's power when they interact, and a station centered on Roxxon, where participants can create a badge giving them access to prizes from PlayStation Vue and Freeform.

== Release ==
The season premiered on Freeform on June 7, 2018, consisting of 10 episodes and concluding on August 2. It was originally intended to premiere in 2017 when it was first ordered to series. ABC Spark aired the season in Canada, also starting on June 7, with Amazon Video airing the season in the United Kingdom and select additional European countries, starting on June 8, 2018.

== Reception ==
=== Ratings ===
Viewership and ratings per episode of Cloak & Dagger season 1
No.	Title	Air date	Rating (18–49)	Viewers (millions)	DVR (18–49)	DVR viewers (millions)	Total (18–49)	Total viewers (millions)
1	"First Light"	June 7, 2018	0.3	0.919	0.3	0.831	0.6	1.751
2	"Suicide Sprints"	June 7, 2018	0.3	0.750	0.3	0.727	0.6	1.478
3	"Stained Glass"	June 14, 2018	0.2	0.548	—N/a	—N/a	—N/a	—N/a
4	"Call/Response"	June 21, 2018	0.2	0.606	0.3	0.729	0.5	1.335
5	"Princeton Offense"	June 28, 2018	0.2	0.509	—N/a	—N/a	—N/a	—N/a
6	"Funhouse Mirrors"	July 5, 2018	0.2	0.499	—N/a	—N/a	—N/a	—N/a
7	"Lotus Eaters"	July 12, 2018	0.2	0.538	0.2	0.553	0.4	1.092
8	"Ghost Stories"	July 19, 2018	0.2	0.401	0.2	0.607	0.4	1.008
9	"Back Breaker"	July 26, 2018	0.2	0.531	0.2	0.648	0.4	1.179
10	"Colony Collapse"	August 2, 2018	0.2	0.423	—N/a	—N/a	—N/a	—N/a

After three days, "First Light" had 1.64 million total viewers, which was a 78% increase from its initial viewers, the largest three-day lift for any Freeform debut. It was also the best series launch on Freeform in two years and Freeform's most-watched drama since "Till Death Do Us Part", the series finale of Pretty Little Liars in June 2017. "First Light" also had the biggest digital debut ever for the network, with 716,000 starts. The premiere drew 7.3 million views across linear and digital platforms and was Thursday's most-social scripted series with 112,000 engagements across Twitter, Instagram, Facebook and Tumblr.

=== Critical response ===
The review aggregator website Rotten Tomatoes reported an 89% approval rating with an average rating of 7.50/10 based on 54 reviews. The website's critical consensus reads, "Cloak & Dagger blends soapy drama with superhero grit to create an exciting, surprisingly thoughtful addition to the genre — even if it falls prey to a certain amount of narrative bloat." Metacritic, which uses a weighted average, assigned a score of 68 out of 100 based on reviews from 22 critics, indicating "generally favorable" reviews.

Early reactions to the first episode from its screening at South by Southwest 2018 were largely positive, with praise going to Joseph and Holt's performances. Alex McLevy of The A.V. Club noted the screening debuted "to raucous applause", and felt "The show definitely looks good. It has some real issues in other areas, but the charismatic leads are the true find, and if the show succeeds, it will largely be on the back of the work they do." He added that there were major changes from the comics, including the relocation of the character from New York to New Orleans and the addition of "parents, home lives, and all manner of other backstories rejiggered to serve the long-form TV storytelling framework." Meredith Borders of /Film gave the first episode a 9 out of 10, calling it "among the upper echelon of Marvel television.... [doing] so with style and powerful storytelling" and felt it was "new in every particular way". Borders felt the leads "have tremendous chemistry onscreen" that she became "deeply invested" in. She also called the look of the season "much richer and more textured" than many other superhero and Freeform series, felt the protagonists' powers were shown "in a really visually organic way", and praised Isham's music. Borders also noted the strong divergence from the comics source material, but felt "the spirit of the characters absolutely remains the same."

In his review of the first four episodes, Daniel Fienberg of The Hollywood Reporter felt while there were "no superheroes, no mission and no clear bad guy" in these early episodes, he "found [him]self enjoying quite a bit thanks to the solid introductions to the human side of its characters, an often innovative structure, fine use of its New Orleans backdrop and a few moments of real cleverness. If, on some levels, Cloak & Dagger is oddly sluggish, there's a lot happening in these early episodes, some of it fun." Reviewing the first two episodes, IGN's Joi Childs awarded the episodes an 8.5 out of 10, noting, "Tackling a variety of relatable subjects while embracing the thrill of discovering new powers, Cloak & Dagger delivers an emotionally honest and surprisingly resonant premiere. The pacing can feel a bit slower than one might expect or want from a superhero TV show, but thanks to the drama, effects, mystery and chemistry between the main protagonists, the premiere builds a solid foundation for Marvel's newest series." Merrill Barr at Forbes wrote, "Without question, it can be said Cloak & Dagger plays right into the hand of the audience it's gaming for. This is one of the darkest and moodiest YA series to ever YA... Unfortunately, the series suffers from the problem many shows of its type do: it takes far longer than it should to dive deep into the meat of its story." In comparison to the other Marvel Television series, Barr felt Cloak & Dagger "exists somewhere between the light-hearted, broad stroke nature of Agents of S.H.I.E.L.D. and very mature dramatic overtones of any of the Netflix series". Abraham Riesman of Vulture felt "there's a lot going on in Cloak & Dagger, and if it can keep up its pace of invention and revelation, it promises to be your essential superhero watch of the summer." He also praised "Marvel Television's willingness to boil a superhero concept down to the elements that work best and, beyond that, be purely inventive," enjoying the change of location to New Orleans over the New York setting from the comics.

For io9, Charles Pulliam-Moore said, "Cloak & Dagger isn't exactly a show for die-hard comic book purists looking for a live-action translation of the superheroes they love, but that ultimately works out in its favor because that's not what it's trying to be. Cloak & Dagger wants you to see the power in and importance of being able to see across differences—a bit of a cheesy message, perhaps, but one that we could all stand to remind ourselves of more often." He was critical of the pacing, a common issue across many of the Marvel Television series, but conceded, while the "forward momentum from scene to scene is lacking... all of the performances are stellar." Giving the season a "B", Entertainment Weekly's Darren Franich was "pessimistic and optimistic" about the series, and hoped its "openhearted thoughtfulness [could] energize its rather bargain-bin super-mythology". He felt the season took the "rough outline" of the comics "and cleverly modernizes it in unexpected directions" and throughout the early episodes the New Orleans location "finds unexpected ways to root Tyrone and Tandy in the local culture". Franich was also critical of the pacing. Giving the first four episodes 2 out of 4 stars, Allison Keene of Collider was more critical of the season. She was also critical of the pacing, called the writing "shaky", wished more was done with the New Orleans setting, and felt that attempting to split the early episodes between both Johnson and Bowen, resulted in "jarring edits, half-baked plots, and quickly-forgotten side characters."

=== Accolades ===
Deadline Hollywood felt the season was one of the best to air in summer 2018.

Year	Award	Category	Recipient(s)	Result	Ref.
2018	Teen Choice Awards	Choice Summer TV Show	Cloak & Dagger	Nominated	
2018	Teen Choice Awards	Choice Summer TV Star	Olivia Holt	Won	
2018	Teen Choice Awards	Choice Summer TV Star	Aubrey Joseph	Nominated	
