= Cloak & Dagger season 2 =

Cloak & Dagger
- Season 2
- Promotional poster
- Showrunner: Joe Pokaski
- Starring: Olivia Holt; Aubrey Joseph; Gloria Reuben; Andrea Roth; J. D. Evermore; Emma Lahana
- No. of episodes: 10

Release
- Original network: Freeform
- Original release: April 4 – May 30, 2019

Season chronology
- ← Previous; Season 1

The second and final season of the American cable television series Cloak & Dagger, based on the Marvel Comics characters of the same name, sees Tandy Bowen (Dagger) and Tyrone "Ty" Johnson (Cloak) use their superpowers together. It is set in the Marvel Cinematic Universe (MCU), sharing continuity with the films and other television series of the franchise. The season is produced by ABC Signature Studios, Marvel Television, and Wandering Rocks Productions, with Pokaski serving as showrunner.

Olivia Holt and Aubrey Joseph star as Bowen and Johnson, with Gloria Reuben, Andrea Roth, J. D. Evermore, and Emma Lahana also starring. In July 2018, the series was renewed for a second season, with filming beginning that October.

The season premiered on April 4, 2019, and concluded on May 30 on Freeform. Freeform canceled the series on October 24, 2019.

== Episodes ==
No. overall	No. in season	Title	Directed by	Written by	Original release date	U.S. viewers (millions)
11	1	"Restless Energy"	Jennifer Phang	Joe Pokaski	April 4, 2019	0.477
Eight months after Roxxon Gulf's defeat, Tandy Bowen and Tyrone Johnson's lives have changed. Tandy has returned to taking ballet and has an improved relationship with her mother. They attend a domestic abuse support group where Tandy secretly threatens a fellow attendee's abusive spouse, to no avail. Tyrone lives in the abandoned church where he steals money and drugs from drug dealers to help Brigid O'Reilly, who is still recuperating from her traumatizing near death experience. She reprimands him, as he is only making things worse for New Orleans; with the gangs now becoming protective and may potentially go to war with one another. Tyrone keeps tabs on his parents and Evita, and meets with Tandy every week to watch movies. When Tandy discovers that Tyrone is conducting vigilante work, she is upset with him for not asking her for help. He later apologizes and the two head to the Rougarou Club to record a meeting with the gang leaders as evidence. However, someone attacks them, and Tandy and Tyrone enter the meeting to discover that everyone has been slaughtered.
12	2	"White Lines"	Jeff Woolnough	Peter Calloway & Niceole R. Levy	April 4, 2019	0.399
O'Reilly arrives at the Rougarou Club, where she demands that Tandy and Tyrone leave. Before doing so, Tyrone spots a symbol left by one of the murdered victims, and learns through Chantelle that it is a veve; a symbol of the voodoo spirituals. Tyrone reveals his powers to Evita, who is upset at his absence, but later forgives him. Tandy gets mad at Mikayla, a woman at the support group, for being attached to her abusive spouse and leaves. Tandy discovers that she is missing and finds comfort in the friendly support leader, Andre Deschaine. Tyrone and Tandy, separate from each other, learn that Mikayla was kidnapped by someone who forced heroin into her body, causing her to be hospitalized. O'Reilly seemingly develops a split personality with a more confident and violent outlook. She teams up with Tandy to look for the ambulance driver and Tandy uses a new ability to stop him while O'Reilly secretly kills him. Evita teaches Tyrone how to teleport other people with him. He later finds O'Reilly at home tied up. They both find Tandy and learn that there are two O'Reillys now.
13	3	"Shadow Selves"	Matt Hastings	Kate Rorick & Marcus J. Guillory	April 11, 2019	0.404
The second O'Reilly, dubbed Mayhem, was split off from the original after being hit with the dark energy combined with the blackout. Angry and confused, Mayhem spends the following months hunting for Connors and coerces Father Delgado to help her after he quit his job and became a homeless drunk. When Connors' trail goes cold, Mayhem decides to look for the string of missing girls in her own violent way. In the present, Tandy, Tyrone, and O'Reilly go to Mina to learn about the recent anomaly. They discover Mayhem's plan to hunt down and kill all of her leads. After a brief encounter in a strip club, Tandy begins to falter as Mayhem is doing more to rescue victims and defeat the criminals. However, after using her hope touch on a rescued girl, she learns that they have no hope. Tyrone gets information on where the girls were to be taken to and he and Tandy find and rescue more kidnapped victims. Mayhem arrives and attempts to kill a young gang member, but Tyrone absorbs her into his cloak. She finds herself in a void, where she re-confronts Fuchs' death.
14	4	"Rabbit Hold"	Amanda Row	Joy Kecken & J. Holtham	April 18, 2019	0.385
Tandy convinces Tyrone to have her enter his dark dimension by bringing out one of his fears. While inside, she encounters "That Which Stands at the Crossroads", which takes the form of a young Tyrone and sends her on a spiritual journey. Tandy temporarily gives up her powers, resulting in Tyrone losing his, as she enters a reconstruction of a mall where she encounters Mayhem. Tandy is forced to relive repressed memories of her father's abuse towards her mother while Mayhem finds and attempts to kill a disheveled Connors. The Uptown Block Kings recognize Tyrone and find Adina's address. O'Reilly warns Tyrone as he and his mother flee from the gangs. They take refuge at an abandoned convent, but are found by gang member Solomon, who Tyrone and Adina ultimately talk down as Tyrone had saved him from Mayhem. Tyrone has O'Reilly bring the cops, but they arrive with lethal force for Tyrone. As Adina is taken away, Tandy has to use her abilities to save Connors from Mayhem and has herself and him freed. At the same time Tyrone regains his abilities and transports himself back at the church. Connors flees as Tandy and Tyrone recover.
15	5	"Alignment Chart"	Rachel Goldberg	Niceole R. Levy & Peter Calloway	April 25, 2019	0.359
As Tyrone searches for Connors, Tandy still continues to focus on the sex trafficking ring. Connors says his time in the other place has made him realize the wrongs of his actions and he deserves jail, but they must take down his influential uncle and his organization to clear Tyrone's name. Taking Connors to Otis, they come up with a plan to retrieve a hidden file of criminal actions hidden by his uncle Senator Asa Henderson. Tyrone gains O'Reilly's help who is slowly regaining her self-confidence. Thinking Lia was also a victim, Tandy stages a break up with Tyrone, who unknowingly poses as her abusive boyfriend; offending him into leaving Tandy. Lia opens up about her ex-boyfriend forcing her to become a prostitute, and he now runs a drug ring. Tyrone follows Connors' instructions, but the file isn't there. Teleporting Connors to the church, Tyrone almost kills him until he sees his genuine fear and regret of killing Billy; so he brings him to Adina instead for judgement. Tandy beats up drug dealers and is confronted by Lia. Lia uses a taser on Tandy as an ambulance pulls up, revealing herself as a trafficker.
16	6	"B Sides"	Lauren Wolkstein	Kate Rorick & Pornsak Pichetshote	May 2, 2019	0.311
Lia is revealed to be working for Andre, who has powers that keep sending Tandy's mind into different scenarios; she experiences one where Nathan and Billy never died as everyone attends a celebration when Tyrone becomes a police officer and she's a professional ballerina; one where she works for Roxxon and meets Billy and Tyrone at the rig with their supervisor Mina unimpressed with Nathan Bowen's daughter; and one where she's an addict that cons Liam and his girlfriend Mikayla, and meets Tyrone as a car thief. In each, Tandy and Tyrone activate their powers to support each other. Andre reveals that he tried to kill himself on the night of the Roxxon explosion, when he gained his abilities. Since then, he drains the hopes of the helpless for relief and places their despair in a metaphysical record store. Tandy seemingly escapes as she gets back with Tyrone and O'Reilly to capture Andre and Lia, but Andre shoots and kills Tyrone; revealing it to be an illusion to keep Tandy under. Andre and Lia eventually arrive at the Viking Motel, where they unload Tandy.
17	7	"Vikingtown Sound"	Joe Pokaski	Joe Pokaski	May 9, 2019	0.306
Tandy is trapped at the Viking motel and unable to use her powers due to a lack of hope. She is further drugged by her roommate Del, a girl who believes she has been abandoned, when she tries to escape and is grabbed by Lia's minion Bo. Tyrone meets Andre while looking for Tandy, who convinces him that Tandy abandoned him via the record store; which also inspires Andre to go to Chantelle for information on his veve. Mayhem is able to see Andre there, and puts on different records to motivate Tyrone to look for Tandy. Adina is torn between killing Connors for Billy or leaving him alive for Tyrone. She spares him when he tells her where Billy's body is. Chantelle tells Andre he could ascend to a Loa if he unlocked the secret of his veve. Andre then uses the memories of Evita's birth to instill sadness in Chantelle, killing her. Mayhem destroys the records so that Tyrone can rescue Tandy and Del realizes that Lia lied to her; infusing hope within her and giving Tandy her powers back. Tyrone and Tandy fight their way through the hotel and meet, but the former suddenly collapses.
18	8	"Two Player"	Jessika Borsiczky	Kate Rorick & Joy Kecken	May 16, 2019	0.235
After teleporting himself and Tandy to the church while collapsing to the ground, Tyrone begins emitting dark clouds, while Tandy comforts him, not knowing how to help. O'Reilly and Evita arrive, and the latter opens the door to the Loa dimension for the former and Tandy to go through. Tandy finds herself at an arcade run by Baron Samedi, who has Tyrone trapped playing Duel to D'Spayre, an arcade game. Tandy attempts to help Tyrone beat the game, but she cannot bring herself to finish it and tries to get Tyrone to stop. O'Reilly runs into Mayhem and the two agree to be one again, with the latter taking control every now and then. Evita learns of Chantelle's passing and realizes that she must marry a Loa in order to save her friends. Andre and Lia skip town, but Andre has to drain Lia's energy and abandons her when he figures out his veve. Adina visits Delgado and convinces him to become a priest again so that they can help Tyrone. She confesses that as soon as she got proof of Tyrone's innocence, she killed Connors. Tandy, Tyrone, and a reformed O'Reilly/Mayhem return. Later, Tyrone comforts Tandy after she learned that Melissa has relapsed.
19	9	"Blue Note"	Ami Canaan Mann	Alexandra Kenyon & Peter Calloway	May 23, 2019	0.324
Eight years ago, Andre's jazz career is derailed due to his migraines. When he tries to commit suicide, the Roxxon rig explodes as he slips into the ocean. He awakens in the hospital, where he is tended to by Lia, a nurse, and discovers his powers; which he uses to manipulate her into creating a community support group to heal himself. In the present, Tyrone contacts Solomon to set up a meeting with the rival gangs in New Orleans to look for Andre while Tandy and Mayhem find Lia's unconscious, and humming, body. Tandy and Tyrone go into her mind and pull out some music to "help a friend". Andre catches onto them and announces his plan to become a god by hitting the "blue note". Tandy and Mayhem get into a fight about what to do with Lia, ending with the latter leaving, while Tyrone meets with the gang leaders to get information as well as threaten them against selling drug to people who use it to enslave others. Tandy and Tyrone find Andre activating his veve with several people, including Melissa and Mikayla, in attendance. They all disappear as jazz music is heard.
20	10	"Level Up"	Philip John	Joe Pokaski	May 30, 2019	0.346
People begin disappearing all over the city and appearing in a trance in a metaphysical club to listen to Andre play his trumpet. As O'Reilly gets a scan about her condition, Mina also disappears. Tyrone and Tandy contact Evita who sets up a portal to the Loa dimension and both go through while Evita guards the candle connecting their entry. O'Reilly arrives to defend Evita from shadow soldiers with one of them looking like Fuchs to throw her off. Tyrone and Tandy make their way to Andre and are thrown into hallucinations where Tyrone battles his "perfect" self and Tandy battles her father. Despite Andre's efforts, Tandy and Tyrone come out victorious and use their powers to defeat Andre, defeating him for good and setting everyone free. In the aftermath, Tyrone is cleared of his crimes as Otis and Adina rest easy, Senator Henderson is arrested when his cover-up was exposed, Evita holds a Loa funeral for Andre, Lia is seen picking up garbage with her fellow inmates following her arrest, O'Reilly drops Connors' body off at the police station with a sign that says "guilty" on him, Delgado takes over the abandoned church, and Melissa sees Tandy off as she decides to leave town. Tyrone joins her as the two, using info from O'Reilly, decide to travel together so that they can be heroes.

== Cast and characters ==
=== Main ===
- Olivia Holt as Tandy Bowen / Dagger
- Aubrey Joseph as Tyrone "Ty" Johnson / Cloak
- Gloria Reuben as Adina Johnson
- Andrea Roth as Melissa Bowen
- J. D. Evermore as James Connors
- Emma Lahana as Brigid O'Reilly and Mayhem

=== Recurring ===
- Miles Mussenden as Otis Johnson
- Noëlle Renée Bercy as Evita Fusilier
- Angela Davis as Chantelle Fusilier
- Dilshad Vadsaria as Avandalia "Lia" Dewan
- Brooklyn McLinn as Andre Deschaine / D'Spayre
- Cecilia Leal as Mikayla Bell
- Joshua J. Williams as Solomon

=== Notable guests ===
- Jaime Zevallos as Francis Delgado
- Carl Lundstedt as Liam Walsh
- Andy Dylan as Nathan Bowen
- Ally Maki as Mina Hess
- Lane Miller as Kenneth Fuchs
- Marqus Clae as Billy Johnson
- Gralen Banks as Choo Choo Broussard
- Dalon J. Holland as Duane Porter
- Justin Sams as Baron Samedi

== Production ==
=== Development ===
On July 20, 2018, Freeform renewed the series for a 10-episode second season.

=== Writing ===
The majority of the writers for the first season return for the second. During the first season, showrunner Joe Pokaski noted the final episode would leave "some stuff open, intentionally" to be addressed in the second season, through its post-credit scene, which established Brigid O'Reilly as a threat to the heroes, while the announcement trailer for the second season teased the inclusion of her comics alter ego Mayhem. Pokaski believed O'Reilly would be a relatable villain, describing her as "kind of what we wish we all were if we didn't face consequences". He added that a lot of the development that the character has in the first season was written as an origin story for the character to become a villain in the second season. He further described her as "one of the first big scary things" that Tandy and Tyrone face in the second season. The first-season finale also introduces Tyrone's ability to absorb people into his cloak, and Pokaski said that Tyrone is "a doorway to something", which would be explored further in the second season. Additionally, Tandy and Tyrone's living arrangements are reversed from the first season, allowing Tandy to explore a side of herself that she has neglected, and for Tyrone to figure out himself "without the facade that he's put up.

The season would also continue to explore vodun and the "Divine Pairing" mythology established in the first season, with Pokaski saying, "We want to respectfully continue to use Vodun as a mirror upon which we show not only our moral, but our psychological abstracts of our characters."

=== Casting ===
Olivia Holt, Aubrey Joseph, Gloria Reuben, Andrea Roth, and Emma Lahana return to star in the season as Tandy Bowen / Dagger, Tyrone Johnson / Cloak, Adina Johnson, Melissa Bowen and Brigid O'Reilly, respectively. J. D. Evermore also returns as James Connors.

Former series regular Miles Mussenden recurs in the season as Otis Johnson, along with returning guest stars Noëlle Renée Bercy as Evita Fusilier and Angela Davis as Chantelle Fusilier. Also returning from earlier in the series are former series regulars Jaime Zevallos and Carl Lundstedt as Francis Delgado and Liam Walsh, respectively. Ally Maki also returns in her guest role as Mina Hess.

Season two added Brooklyn McLinn, Dilshad Vadsaria and Cecilia Leal to the cast as Andre Deschaine, Lia Dewan and Mikayla Bell respectively.

=== Filming ===
Filming began in New Orleans by October 18, 2018.

=== Marvel Cinematic Universe tie-ins ===
Ben Urich, who appears in Daredevil portrayed by Vondie Curtis-Hall, is referenced in the series. A newspaper article about Luke Cage, written by Karen Page, including a picture of the titular character portrayed by Mike Colter, is prominently featured in the season.

== Release ==
The season premiered on Freeform April 4, 2019, with its first two episodes, and consisted of 10 episodes.

== Reception ==
=== Ratings ===
Viewership and ratings per episode of Cloak & Dagger season 2
No.	Title	Air date	Rating (18–49)	Viewers (millions)	DVR (18–49)	DVR viewers (millions)	Total (18–49)	Total viewers (millions)
1	"Restless Energy"	April 4, 2019	0.2	0.477	0.1	0.323	0.3	0.800 (Note: Live +7 ratings were not available, so Live +3 ratings have been used instead.)
2	"White Lines"	April 4, 2019	0.1	0.399	0.1	0.327	0.2	0.726
3	"Shadow Selves"	April 11, 2019	0.1	0.404	0.2	0.363	0.3	0.768
4	"Rabbit Hold"	April 18, 2019	0.2	0.385	—N/a	0.400	—N/a	0.786
5	"Alignment Chart"	April 25, 2019	0.1	0.359	0.2	0.470	0.3	0.830
6	"B Sides"	May 2, 2019	0.1	0.311	—N/a	0.360	—N/a	0.673
7	"Vikingtown Sound"	May 9, 2019	0.1	0.306	—N/a	0.354	—N/a	0.661
8	"Two Player"	May 16, 2019	0.1	0.235	—N/a	0.389	—N/a	0.626
9	"Blue Note"	May 23, 2019	0.1	0.324	—N/a	0.368	—N/a	0.693
10	"Level Up"	May 30, 2019	0.1	0.346	—N/a	0.386	—N/a	0.734

=== Critical response ===
The review aggregator website Rotten Tomatoes reported an 86% approval rating with an average rating of 9.1/10 based on 7 reviews.

/Film's Monique Jones gave the second season a "B−", saying that the first season had a stronger sense of direction. Samantha Nelson of The Verge critiqued season 2's use of a "ridiculous, well-worn supervillain trope". ComicBook.com's Charlie Ridgely gave the season 5/5 stars, praising the show's ability to tackle real-world issues such as police brutality and human trafficking.
