= Tyrone Johnson and Tandy Bowen (Marvel Cinematic Universe) =

Characters in the Marvel Cinematic Universe

- Marvel Cinematic Universe character
- Aubrey Joseph as Tyrone Johnson (left) and Olivia Holt as Tandy Bowen (right) in the second season of Cloak & Dagger
- First appearance: "First Light"; Cloak & Dagger; (2018)
- Last appearance: "Devil's Torture Chamber"; Runaways; (2019)
- Created by: Joe Pokaski
- Based on: Cloak and Dagger by: Bill Mantlo; Ed Hannigan
- Portrayed by: Tyrone Johnson; Aubrey Joseph; Maceo Smedley III (young); Tandy Bowen; Olivia Holt; Rachel Ryals (young)

In-universe information
- Family: Tyrone Johnson; Otis Johnson (father); Adina Johnson (mother); Billy Johnson (brother); Tandy Bowen; Nathan Bowen (father); Melissa Bowen (mother)
- Nationality: American

Tyrone "Ty" Johnson and Tandy Bowen are fictional characters primarily portrayed by Aubrey Joseph and Olivia Holt in the Marvel Cinematic Universe (MCU) television series, based on the Marvel Comics characters of the same name. Teenagers connected through a shared childhood tragedy who acquire superpowers of darkness and light though the Roxxon Corporation before becoming romantically involved with one another, the characters were introduced in Cloak & Dagger (2018–2019). Joseph and Holt then signed a deal to return for the third season of Runaways (2019).

== Fictional character biography ==
=== Cloak & Dagger ===
In the first season of Cloak & Dagger, set in New Orleans, Louisiana, teenagers Tyrone "Ty" Johnson and Tandy Bowen, connected through a shared childhood tragedy and respectively coming from backgrounds of wealth and poverty, acquire superpowers after a life-changing event revolving around the collapse of the Roxxon Gulf Platform. As their friendship unfolds into romance, they soon realize that their new-found powers work better when they are together, they use these powers to try to fix some of the wrong in the world as the superheroes Cloak and Dagger, respectively with the ability to engulf others in darkness and transport them through the Darkforce Dimension, and the ability to emit daggers of solid light. In the second season, Cloak and Dagger work to solve the abductions of women run by Andre Deschaine while facing Brigid O'Reilly's vigilante half Mayhem.

=== Runaways ===
Ahead of the series premiere of Cloak & Dagger, considering the larger events of the MCU at that point, Pokaski said he was "not allowed to talk about" how the series would connect to the events of Avengers: Infinity War but stated "We've had some exciting conversations about how we could artfully cross [Cloak and Dagger] over [to other Marvel properties]. The beauty of these two is that they can show up anywhere [and it makes sense]." After the first-season finale, Pokaski expanded, saying he would "love" to have Cloak and Dagger appear in the MCU films "as utility players the way they are in comics", but conceded "there are a lot of legal hurdles and corporate barriers to doing that". Regarding a crossover with the Hulu MCU streaming television series Runaways, Pokaski noted "there's hopefully there's some karma we can fulfill there" since the duo in the comics appear early in the Runaways comic series, while Jeph Loeb said that "You'll see things that comment on each other; we try to touch base wherever we can... things that are happening in L.A. [where Runaways is set] are not exactly going to be affecting what's happening in New Orleans [where Cloak & Dagger is set]... It's being aware of it and trying to find a way [to connect] that makes sense." On August 1, 2019, Holt and Joseph were announced to appear in the third season of Runaways, appearing in the episodes "Left-Hand Path" and "Devil's Torture Chamber".

== Concept and creation ==
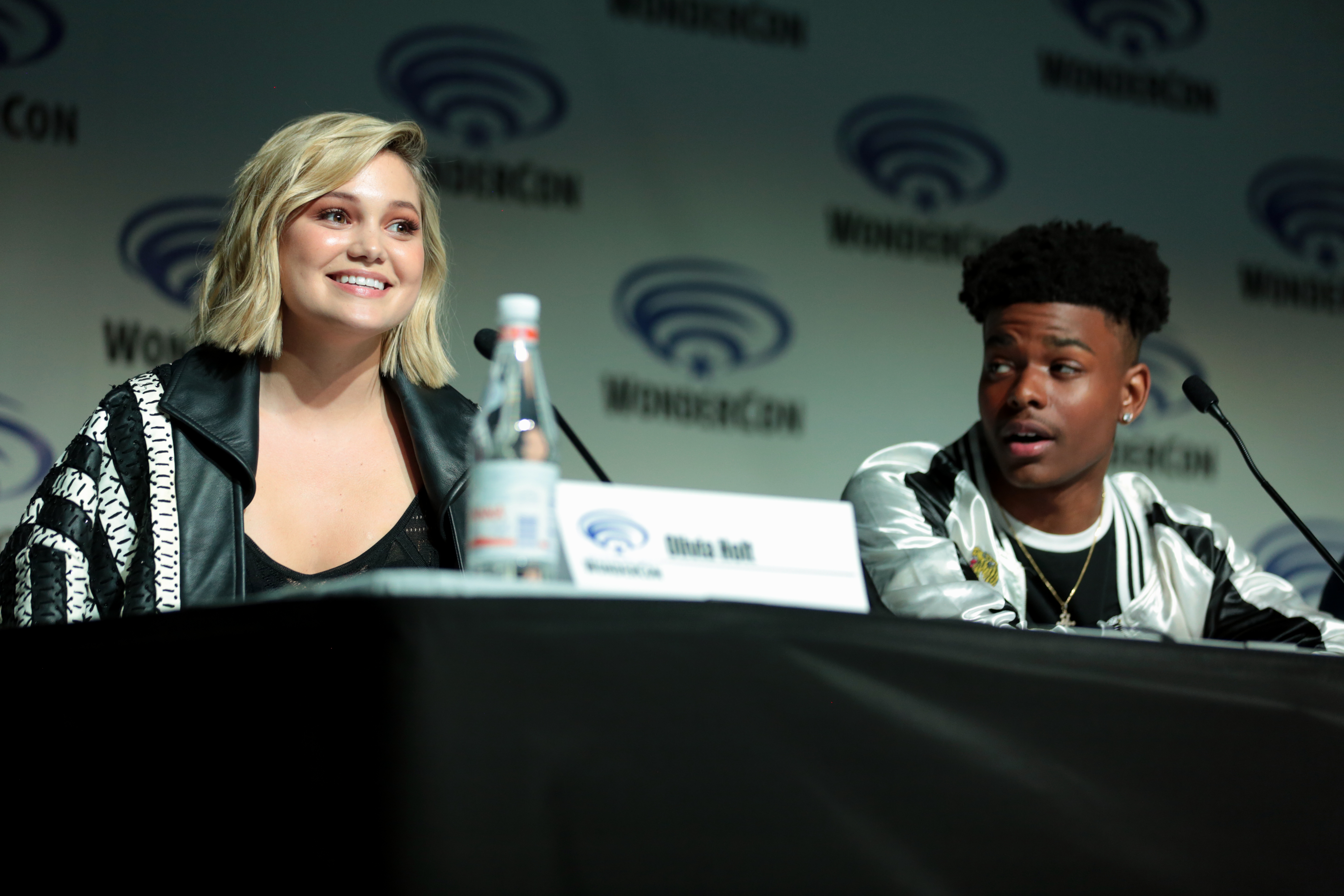
Olivia Holt and Aubrey Joseph at WonderCon 2018 promoting the first season of Cloak & Dagger.

At San Diego Comic-Con in 2011, head of Marvel Television Jeph Loeb announced the series Cloak & Dagger was in development at ABC Family. The series, which would be set in post-Hurricane Katrina New Orleans, would follow Tyrone Johnson / Cloak and Tandy Bowen / Dagger as the two "find each other and realize that their powers both complement and complicate their lives", and written by Joe Pokaski. In April 2016, the series received a straight-to-series order for Freeform, the new name of ABC Family, from ABC Signature Studios and Marvel Television.

In January 2017, it was announced that Aubrey Joseph and Olivia Holt had been cast as Cloak and Dagger, respectively. Gina Prince-Bythewood, the director of the first episode, called the casting process "really, really tough ... it was three days before we were supposed to leave [to begin filming] and we didn't find [actors for Cloak and Dagger]. People started getting willing to settle and the people that were on the table were 27, 28. They felt grown and it didn't feel right for the show. Then Aubrey and Olivia walked in the door, and they had such great chops individually". Maceo Smedley III and Rachel Ryals were subsequently respectively cast as a young Tyrone and Tandy.

== Characterization ==
Series showrunner and executive producer Joe Pokaski spoke about the differences in Cloak and Dagger's origin story from the comics, saying, "I think the original [comic] stories were fantastic, but for the time, while they were a little progressive, they were a little bit sexist and racist once you got into it, for now. What we tried to do was deconstruct it and make it about [Cloak and Dagger], understand who they were." Since the original comics "are a little dated", Pokaski and the writers could to make adjustments accordingly as Cloak and Dagger do not have an established comics mythology, making sure "we were telling the right story for now". He also felt Loeb's idea of having the duo live in New Orleans, opposed to New York City as in the comics, was a "great idea". Since Marvel was also developing The Defenders at the same time, moving to the New Orleans setting "came up pretty early", since Pokaski felt that "the New York City of the Marvel Cinematic Universe ha[d] enough superheroes." When looking for alternate locations, and considering places with filming tax incentives, New Orleans "felt so right for [Cloak and Dagger]. It felt gothic, it felt a little bit dark, it felt like a place of light and shadow. The more we learned about the city and about its history and about voudon or the Mardi Gras Indians, it felt like it was the only place for Cloak and Dagger to start."

Pokaski did not want to rush the romantic relationship between the duo in the first season, insisting that the season is "more about finding your best friend... this show is about 'There's exactly one person who understands me.'", and hoping that the series would last long enough to allow for "an interesting path to their relationship", Pokaski further said of Cloak in the series that "There was something interesting in helping him to understand that everyone is afraid." and feeling that Dagger was "more cynical" than previous animated portrayals, and noted that when she touches people she can access their hopes and desires, saying, "There's something exciting about having a cynical character like Dagger who steals things and doesn't believe in the good of man, yet sees the best in them when she touches them". The first season does hint at the pair becoming a romantic couple, with Pokaski and the writers being "excited to tease what will happen in their future". Structurally for the season, Pokaski felt the first four episodes was the season's first act, where viewers get to understand [Cloak and Dagger] individually, the next three "are about them coming together comprehensively, not only as a team, but as best friends", before concluding with the last three episodes.

Following the first-season finale reveal of Cloak's ability to absorb people into his cloak, Pokaski said that Cloak is "a doorway to something" and "we're going to step into that doorway a little more" into the series' second season. Pokaski enjoyed being able to unfold the characters' powers like this so they could be tied to emotions. Pokaski said the season would explore his favorite element of superhero stories: people balancing their personal life with their responsibility as a hero. He said it would also show how a person can become a vigilante in a way that he hoped would be unique from other installments in the superhero genre. The season also sees the living arrangements of Cloak and Dagger reversed from the first, with Cloak now on the run from the police and living in the abandoned church that Dagger had been living in, until she moved back in with her mother at the end of the first season. Pokaski felt this would allow them to explore a side of Dagger that she herself has neglected, as well as showing who Cloak is without the "brave face" he has been putting on.

== Reception ==
Early reactions to the Cloak & Dagger series premiere "First Light" from its screening at South by Southwest 2018 were largely positive, with praise going to Joseph and Holt's performances. Alex McLevy of The A.V. Club noted that "the charismatic leads are the true find, and if the show succeeds, it will largely be on the back of the work they do." He further praised the title characters' major changes from the comics, including the relocation of the characters from New York to New Orleans and the addition of "parents, home lives, and all manner of other backstories rejiggered to serve the long-form TV storytelling framework." Meredith Borders of /Film felt the leads "have tremendous chemistry onscreen" that she became "deeply invested" in, calling it "among the upper echelon of Marvel television.... [doing] so with style and powerful storytelling" and felt it was "new in every particular way". She also felt the protagonists' powers were shown "in a really visually organic way"; while noting the strong divergence from the comics source material, she nonetheless felt that "the spirit of the characters absolutely remains the same."

In his review of the first four episodes of the first season, Daniel Fienberg of The Hollywood Reporter felt that he "found [him]self enjoying quite a bit thanks to the solid introductions to the human side of its characters". Reviewing the first two episodes, IGN's Joi Childs lauded Joseph and Holt's performances for "[t]ackling a variety of relatable subjects while embracing the thrill of discovering new powers [and] deliver[ing] an emotionally honest and surprisingly resonant premiere", concluding that "thanks to the drama, effects, mystery and chemistry between the main protagonists, the premiere builds a solid foundation for Marvel's newest series." For io9, Charles Pulliam-Moore noted the series as "[not] exactly a show for die-hard comic book purists looking for a live-action translation of the superheroes they love, but that ultimately works out in its favor because that's not what it's trying to be." Allison Keene of Collider was critical of the attempts to split the early episodes between both Johnson and Bowen. Entertainment Weekly's Darren Franich complimented the first season for taking a "rough outline" of the comics "and cleverly moderniz[ing] it in unexpected directions" and how throughout the early episodes the New Orleans location "finds unexpected ways to root Tyrone and Tandy in the local culture."

=== Accolades ===
Holt and Joseph were both nominated for Choice Summer TV Star at the 2018 Teen Choice Awards, with Holt for the win. Joseph was nominated for Choice Fantasy Sci/Fi Actor and Holt was nominated for Choice Fantasy/Sci-Fi Actress at the 2019 Teen Choice Awards.

== See also ==
- Characters of the Marvel Cinematic Universe
- List of Cloak & Dagger characters
