= Into Asylum =

- Heroes episode
- Peter and Angela go into hiding inside a church.
- Episode no.: Season 3 Episode 21
- Directed by: Jim Chory
- Written by: Joe Pokaski
- Production code: 321
- Original air date: March 30, 2009

Guest appearances
- Kevin Alejandro as Agent Jenkins; Jake McLaughlin as Sligo; Željko Ivanek as Emile Danko; Manuel Urrego as James Martin; Daniel Desmond as Father Vance

Episode chronology
← Previous "Cold Snap"	Next → "Turn and Face the Strange"
- Heroes season 3

"Into Asylum" is the twenty-first episode of the third season of the NBC superhero drama series Heroes and fifty-fifth episode overall. The episode aired on March 30, 2009.

== Synopsis ==
Nathan Petrelli and Claire Bennet have flown to Pátzcuaro, Mexico, where Nathan checks them into a motel for the night, planning to hide from the government agents until he can come up with a plan. At a local cantina, Nathan attempts to win some money by playing a drinking game with some patrons, but ends up passing out. Claire offers to take over, and due to her regenerative abilities, she is unable to become intoxicated and wins the game. Claire then takes Nathan back to their hotel room. Nathan reveals the reason he had given Claire a free pass was that he had hoped he could win her over. As Nathan falls asleep, he says he will make some calls the next day to fix his mess. The next morning, however, Nathan reveals he has nothing, attributing his earlier pledge to fix things to being drunk. Claire angrily accuses him of not trying, saying she has always looked up to him as her "Superman," and leaves in a huff. Nathan later finds Claire waiting for a bus to head back to San Diego, and mentions he will be flying up to the states. Claire at first refuses, but then smiles and goes along with Nathan.

Peter Petrelli and his mother Angela Petrelli have flown to a church, where Angela claims she needs to rest and find some answers. Angela says she needs to fall asleep so she can dream. While Angela rests, Peter prays to God, demanding why he was never given something in return for saving the world. However, they are interrupted by men from the agency, who have entered the church. Peter and Angela go to hide in a confessional. Fitting to their location, Angela confesses that she too was once like Peter, and that she chose to pay a heavy price to save the world. The door to their booth is then opened by Noah Bennet, who keeps their location a secret and gives the all-clear to the other agents. Afterwards, Angela finally manages to sleep, and when awoken says she has dreamt again. She tells Peter they need to reunite their family, including Nathan and Claire, as well as a previously unmentioned sister of Angela's.

Emile Danko is investigating a case in Arlington, Virginia, where three agents were killed trying to apprehend a man named James Martin. An agent named Jenkins recounts how he found the three lying there when he arrived, having suffered shots to the head at close range with no sign of a scuffle. Although Martin's ability is unknown, they have identified him as a person with abilities via comparing his DNA from a national database. Noah chastises Danko for sending his men in without knowing about the intended target, but Danko says he is desperate. Danko gets in his car, turns on the radio (Del Shannon's "Runaway" is playing), and is about to pull out when Sylar appears in his backseat, revealing he was the one who sent him Eric Doyle and the stuffed rabbit from the previous episode. He then offers to help Danko catch Martin and other people with abilities, and mysteriously disappears before Danko can draw his gun on him. Danko talks with Noah, wondering how he was able to work with people with abilities during his time at Primatech. Noah replies that he just found ways to appeal to them. Later, Jenkins talks to Danko briefly before he is interrupted by a phone call from Sylar. As Jenkins leaves, Sylar informs Danko he found another body, that of Jenkins. They then realize that the man Danko was just talking to was Martin, who has the ability to shape-shift. Danko and his men give chase, but Martin escapes.

Later, Danko catches Sylar at Martin's house, and asks why he shouldn't just kill him now. Sylar repeats his previous offer, telling him he can help him track and kill people with abilities. They are able to track Martin to a nightclub, where they easily find him as he has shape-shifted to appear as Danko. The two lose him in the crowd, however. Danko then meets back with Sylar and informs him he is leaving. As they exit, Danko turns around and fires on Sylar; the real Sylar then enters, as the one Danko had shot was in fact Martin. Sylar then proceeds to take Martin's ability, and kills him. Later, Noah is stunned to see Sylar's body getting zipped up in a body bag, it being still unknown to everyone that this is actually Martin. Sylar meets with Danko again, and Sylar states that it will be easier for the two to operate now that everyone believes him to be dead. Danko then comments that if they succeed, Sylar will be the last person left with abilities, though Sylar just smiles and responds that it's funny how that works out.

There is also a reference to the film Se7en, when Danko asks Sylar whats in the box before opening it to find a human head.

== Critical reception ==
Josh Modell of The A.V. Club rated this episode a B.

Robert Canning of IGN gave the episode 6.9 out of 10.
