= River Guard =

- Directed by: Jim Klock
- Written by: J. Davis
- Produced by: J. Davis; Stacia Crawford
- Starring: Brett Cullen; Eric Ladin; Stacia Crawford; J. D. Evermore; Jeff Kober; Peter Jason
- Cinematography: Joe Stauffer
- Edited by: Brad Geiszler
- Music by: Brooke DeRosa
- Production company: Dralabox
- Distributed by: Indican Pictures
- Release date: 2016
- Running time: 98 min
- Country: United States
- Language: English

River Guard is a 2016 American independent crime film directed by Jim Klock and written by J. Davis. The film stars Brett Cullen, Eric Ladin, Stacia Crawford, Jeff Kober, Peter Jason and J. D. Evermore.

== Plot ==
Crime writer Sean Flynn returns home to North Carolina from New York after a long absence when authorities reopen an old murder case against Richard Adams for the alleged murder of his wife Sara Adams. In the last scene Chuck Flynn admits to his son, that he killed her by accident, when driving drunk.

== Cast ==
- Brett Cullen as Chuck Flynn
- Eric Ladin as Sean Flynn
- Stacia Crawford as Nikki Wallace
- J. D. Evermore as Banger
- Jeff Kober as Detective Mitchell
- Peter Jason as Judge Sullivan
- Doug Burch as Richard Adams
- Aerli Austen as Susie Adams
- Jim Klock as Agent Kohl
- Summer Crockett Moore as Linda Boykin
- Derek Michalak as Tommy Roberts
- Lisa Regina as Richardson
- Robert Dolan as Wayne Copeland

== Production ==
The film was shot in Wilmington, North Carolina. The court house scenes were shot in the New Hanover County Courthouse.
