= List of Marvel Cinematic Universe television series (Marvel Television) =

Marvel Cinematic Universe television series (Marvel Television)
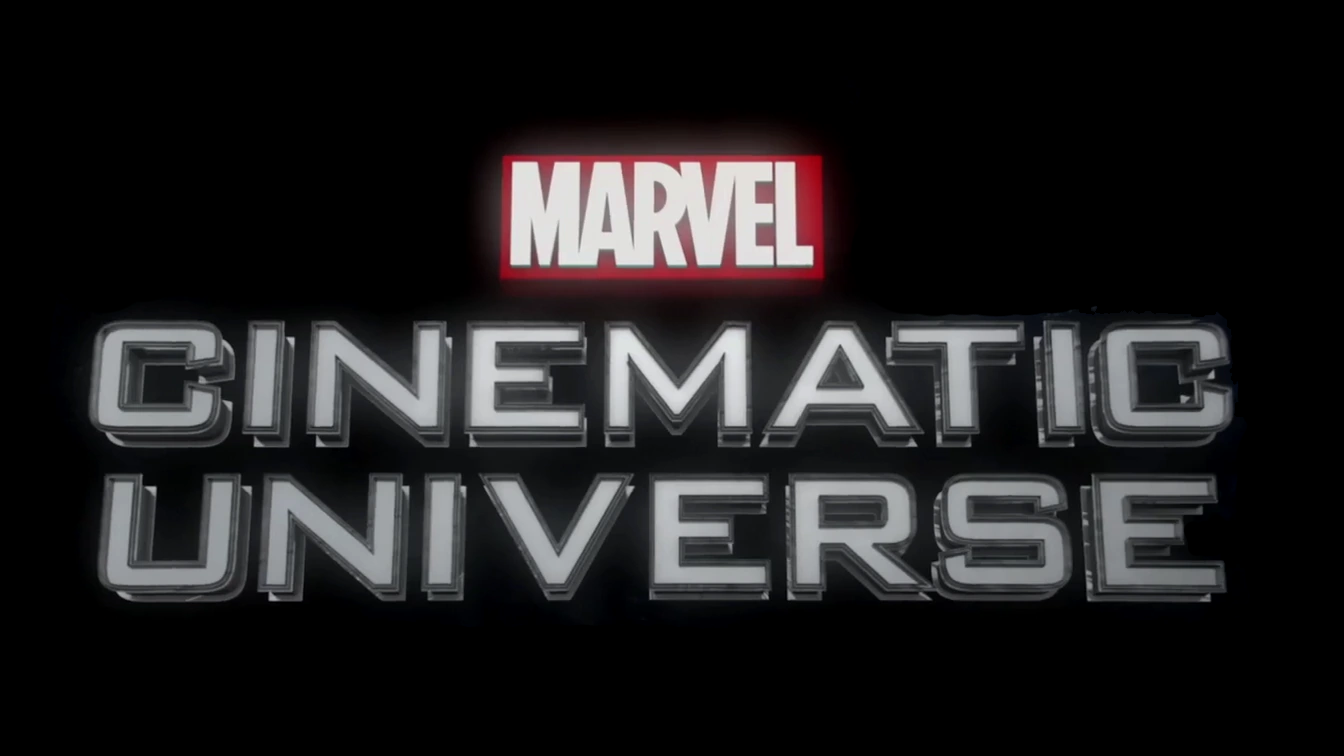
- MCU intertitle from Marvel Studios: Assembling a Universe (2014), which also covered the Marvel Television series
- Genre: Superhero
- Based on: Characters published by Marvel Comics
- Starring: Series actors
- Country of origin: United States
- Original language: English
- No. of seasons: 29 (across 12 series)
- No. of episodes: 386

Production
- Executive producers: Alan Fine; Stan Lee; Joe Quesada; Jim Chory; Jeph Loeb
- Production companies: Marvel Television; ABC Studios; ABC Signature Studios

Original release
- Network: ABC
- Release: September 24, 2013 – August 12, 2020
- Network: Netflix
- Release: April 10, 2015 – June 14, 2019
- Network: Hulu
- Release: November 21, 2017 – December 13, 2019
- Network: Freeform
- Release: June 7, 2018 – May 30, 2019

The Marvel Cinematic Universe (MCU) television series are American superhero television shows produced by Marvel Television—not to be confused with the Marvel Studios label of the same name—based on characters that appear in publications by Marvel Comics. The series are set in, or inspired by, the shared universe of the MCU film franchise.

The MCU first expanded to television after Marvel Television was formed in 2010, with that studio producing 12 series with ABC Studios and its production division ABC Signature Studios. These were released from September 2013 to August 2020 across broadcast on ABC, streaming on Netflix and Hulu, and cable on Freeform. The main ABC series were inspired by the films and featured film characters, while a connected group of series for Netflix crossed over with each other. Young adult-focused series were produced for Freeform and Hulu. Numerous additional series were planned that never materialized, including two unaired pilots as well as a group of series for Hulu called "Adventure into Fear" that were planned before Marvel Television was shut down in December 2019; the Adventure into Fear franchise produced the series Helstrom (2020), which ultimately was disconnected from the MCU upon its release.

Despite featuring characters from and numerous references to the MCU films, the series were widely seen as being ignored by Marvel Studios and the films. This is in contrast to later series developed by Marvel Studios. The latter studio began integrating the Marvel Television series more into the MCU in early 2024 starting with the Netflix shows.

== Development ==
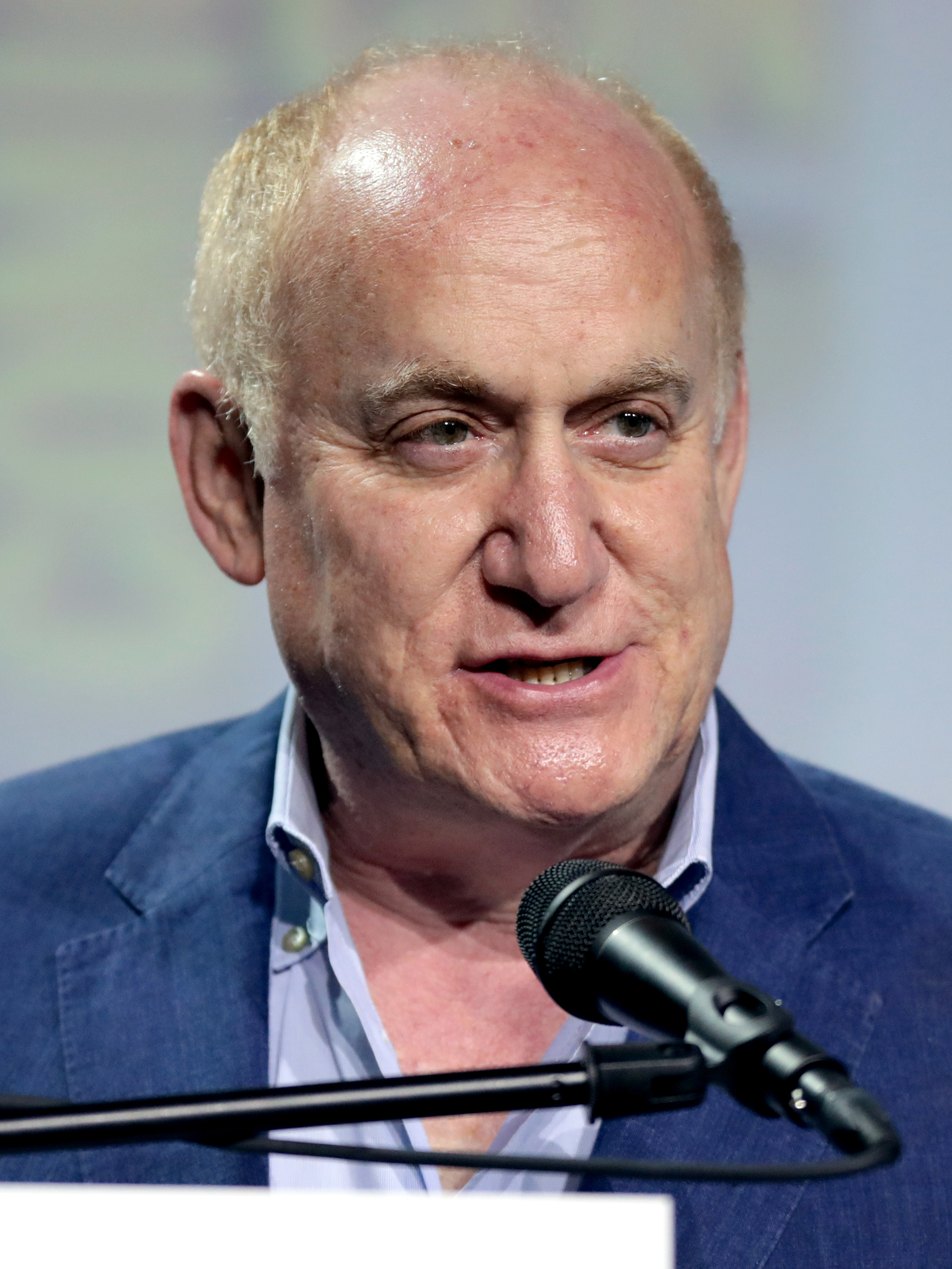
Marvel Television head Jeph Loeb was an executive producer on all of the studio's MCU television series

Marvel Television was launched in June 2010, led by Jeph Loeb. The studio was reported in July 2012 to be in discussions with ABC to create a television series set in the Marvel Cinematic Universe (MCU), which at that time consisted primarily of feature films produced by Marvel Studios. Agents of S.H.I.E.L.D. was ordered to pilot by ABC in August 2012. Marvel Television was made aware of Marvel Studios' plans for future films to avoid interfering with them when introducing someone or something to the shared universe.

By October 2013, Marvel was preparing four drama series and a miniseries to present to video on demand services and cable providers, with Netflix, Amazon, and WGN America expressing interest. Marvel's parent company Disney announced the next month that it would provide Netflix with live-action series based on the characters Daredevil, Jessica Jones, Iron Fist, and Luke Cage, leading to a crossover miniseries based on the Defenders team. A spin-off series based on the Punisher was later added. In January 2014, the series Agent Carter was announced for ABC.

Marvel Studios was integrated into Walt Disney Studios in August 2015. President Kevin Feige was set to report to Walt Disney Studios chairman Alan F. Horn instead of Marvel Entertainment CEO Isaac Perlmutter, while Marvel Television remained under Perlmutter's control. This was seen as widening the existing divide between the Marvel film and television divisions, and making it unlikely that the films would acknowledge the series' events and characters. By that point, the only series that had significant involvement from Marvel Studios was Agent Carter, which was canceled in May 2016 after two seasons.

Freeform ordered Cloak & Dagger to series in April 2016; it was originally announced at the 2011 San Diego Comic-Con for Freeform's predecessor, ABC Family. In August 2016, Hulu ordered a new series based on the comics group the Runaways. Although Marvel initially said there were no plans to crossover Cloak & Dagger and Runaways, the main characters of the former series were later announced to be appearing in the third season of Runaways. In November 2016, Marvel and the IMAX Corporation announced Inhumans, based on the species of the same name, after a planned film starring the characters was removed from Marvel Studios' slate. ABC canceled the series in May 2018. Netflix canceled all of their Marvel series by the end of February 2019. The characters could not appear in any non-Netflix series or films for at least two years following the cancellations.

In July 2019, the seventh season of Agents of S.H.I.E.L.D. was announced to be its last. A month later, Loeb revealed several names that Marvel used internally to categorize its series: the ABC series were known as the "Marvel Heroes" series due to their close connections to the MCU films, especially with the main characters of both Agents of S.H.I.E.L.D. and Agent Carter having originated in films; the Netflix series were known as the "Marvel Street-Level Heroes" or "Marvel Knights"; and Runaways and Cloak & Dagger were known as the "YA" or "young adult" franchise, with Marvel Television's push into the young adult genre in response to Marvel Studios doing the same with Spider-Man. Loeb hoped there would be further crossovers between Cloak and Dagger and Runaways, but the two series were canceled in October and November, respectively.

Following the announcement in September 2018 that Marvel Studios was developing multiple series for the new streaming service Disney+ that would be better connected to the MCU films, Loeb said Marvel Television would develop their own Disney+ series along with other new series for broadcast and cable. However, Variety reported in September 2019 that Marvel Television was likely being phased out in favor of the new Marvel Studios series, which had access to well-known MCU characters, and much larger budgets than the Marvel Television series. Feige was named the chief creative officer of Marvel Entertainment in October. Marvel Television moved under Marvel Studios and its executives began reporting to Feige. Loeb was expected to leave Marvel by the end of the year. In December, Marvel Television announced that it would complete work on its existing television series but would stop developing new projects. The division was set to shut down, with several executives moving to Marvel Studios to oversee the completion of existing series. This included executive producer Karim Zreik, who was made senior vice president of original programming and production for Marvel Television Studios. Other staff were laid off, while Loeb was set to remain with the company until the handover was completed. Zreik later become the head of television for Phil Lord and Christopher Miller, whose projects included Marvel-based series that were intended to connect to the superhero films of Sony's Spider-Man Universe (SSU).

All of the Netflix series were no longer available on Netflix starting March 1, 2022, due to Netflix's license for the series ending and Disney regaining the rights. They all began streaming on Disney+ from March 16, where they were collected under the title "The Defenders Saga".

== Television series ==
=== ABC series ===
ABC television series from Marvel Television
Series	Season	Episodes	Originally released		Showrunner(s)
Series	Season	Episodes	First released	Last released	Showrunner(s)
Agents of S.H.I.E.L.D.	1	22	September 24, 2013	May 13, 2014	Jed Whedon, Maurissa Tancharoen, and Jeffrey Bell
Agents of S.H.I.E.L.D.	2	22	September 23, 2014	May 12, 2015	Jed Whedon, Maurissa Tancharoen, and Jeffrey Bell
Agents of S.H.I.E.L.D.	3	22	September 29, 2015	May 17, 2016	Jed Whedon, Maurissa Tancharoen, and Jeffrey Bell
Agents of S.H.I.E.L.D.	4	22	September 20, 2016	May 16, 2017	Jed Whedon, Maurissa Tancharoen, and Jeffrey Bell
Agents of S.H.I.E.L.D.	5	22	December 1, 2017	May 18, 2018	Jed Whedon, Maurissa Tancharoen, and Jeffrey Bell
Agents of S.H.I.E.L.D.	6	13	May 10, 2019	August 2, 2019	Jed Whedon, Maurissa Tancharoen, and Jeffrey Bell
Agents of S.H.I.E.L.D.	7	13	May 27, 2020	August 12, 2020	Jed Whedon, Maurissa Tancharoen, and Jeffrey Bell
Agent Carter	1	8	January 6, 2015	February 24, 2015	Tara Butters, Michele Fazekas, and Chris Dingess
Agent Carter	2	10	January 19, 2016	March 1, 2016	Tara Butters, Michele Fazekas, and Chris Dingess
Inhumans	1	8	September 29, 2017 (Note: A version of the first two episodes debuted in IMAX theaters on September 1, 2017, and ran for two weeks, before their television premiere on ABC on September 29.)	November 10, 2017	Scott Buck

=== Netflix series ===
Netflix television series from Marvel Television
Series	Season	Episodes	Originally released	Showrunner(s)
Daredevil	1	13	April 10, 2015	Steven S. DeKnight
Daredevil	2	13	March 18, 2016	Douglas Petrie and Marco Ramirez
Daredevil	3	13	October 19, 2018	Erik Oleson
Jessica Jones	1	13	November 20, 2015	Melissa Rosenberg
Jessica Jones	2	13	March 8, 2018	Melissa Rosenberg
Jessica Jones	3	13	June 14, 2019	Melissa Rosenberg and Scott Reynolds
Luke Cage	1	13	September 30, 2016	Cheo Hodari Coker
Luke Cage	2	13	June 22, 2018	Cheo Hodari Coker
Iron Fist	1	13	March 17, 2017	Scott Buck
Iron Fist	2	10	September 7, 2018	M. Raven Metzner
The Defenders	1	8	August 18, 2017	Marco Ramirez
The Punisher	1	13	November 17, 2017	Steve Lightfoot
The Punisher	2	13	January 18, 2019	Steve Lightfoot

=== Young adult series ===
Young adult television series from Marvel Television
Series	Season	Episodes	Originally released			Showrunner(s)
Series	Season	Episodes	First released	Last released	Network	Showrunner(s)
Runaways	1	10	November 21, 2017	January 9, 2018	Hulu	Josh Schwartz and Stephanie Savage
Runaways	2	13	December 21, 2018		Hulu	Josh Schwartz and Stephanie Savage
Runaways	3	10	December 13, 2019		Hulu	Josh Schwartz and Stephanie Savage
Cloak & Dagger	1	10	June 7, 2018	August 2, 2018	Freeform	Joe Pokaski
Cloak & Dagger	2	10	April 4, 2019	May 30, 2019	Freeform	Joe Pokaski

== Crossovers to feature films ==
=== Under Marvel Television ===
After [running something by Jeph] Loeb we'll run it through New York, Joe Quesada, Dan Buckley, and those guys. [Then we] pitch our stuff to Kevin Feige and his movie group to see if there's something we can tie into, to see if they're okay about us using a character, or a weapon or some other cool thing. Everything is interconnected.

— Agents of S.H.I.E.L.D. executive producer Jeffrey Bell in September 2014, on the process of working in with the MCU

Agents of S.H.I.E.L.D. executive producer Jeffrey Bell revealed at the show's 2014 PaleyFest panel that the producers and writers were able to read the screenplays for upcoming MCU films to know where the universe was headed. He noted that since the films have to be "big" and move "quickly through a lot of huge pieces", it was beneficial to have the television series fill in any "gaps" for them. His fellow executive producer Jed Whedon explained that each Marvel project is intended to stand alone first before there is any interweaving, and noted that the series have to be aware of Marvel Studios' plans so as not to interfere when introducing someone or something to the universe. Bell said this was preferable so people who do not watch the films could follow the series, and vice versa. Creator Joss Whedon said this meant the television series got the "leftovers".

In October 2014, Feige said there was potential for characters from the Netflix series to appear in the crossover film Avengers: Infinity War (2018). In March 2015, Loeb said Marvel Television would have to earn the ability to have the Netflix series cross over with the films and ABC series, feeling that each series had to be established and defined on its own before crossovers could occur. In September 2015, Feige elaborated on the films referencing the television series, saying it was inevitable but the timing would be difficult because, though the series' production schedules allowed them to be made faster and align with the films, the long development period for the films made it difficult to reference a series' events.

Loeb reiterated in July 2016 the issue of scheduling, questioning how a television series actor could have a major role in a film when they had to spend six or eight months filming the series. He said this would be less of an issue for minor cameo appearances, but Marvel was not interested in cameos and Easter eggs just for the sake of fan service which could detract from the story. Vincent D'Onofrio, who portrayed Wilson Fisk / Kingpin in Daredevil (2015–2019), said in January 2017 that he was open to appearing in the films but believed it would most likely not happen. D'Onofrio cited Feige's previous reasoning as well as the fact that the films already had difficulty handling the large number of characters they had. Anthony Mackie, who portrays Sam Wilson / Falcon in the MCU, said in March that he did not think a crossover between the films and television series would work given they are "different universes, different worlds, different companies, different designs" and "Kevin Feige is very specific about how he wants the Marvel Universe to be seen in the film world". The next month, Marvel Studios executive Eric Carroll, a producer on the MCU film Spider-Man: Homecoming (2017), said it would be fun to reference the Defenders in a film given the members of that team and Spider-Man are all based in New York City. In May, Feige said a character appearing in a television series would not necessarily exclude them from appearing in a film. He elaborated that "at some point, there's going to be a crossover. Crossover, repetition, or something."

In October 2017, Loeb explained why Avengers Tower is not seen in the shows when they depict New York City, where it is seen in the films. He said Marvel Television wanted to be vague about the television characters' relationships to the tower because that "helps the audience understand that this could be on any street corner", and the characters could be in an area of the city where you would not be able to see the tower. In June 2018, speaking to how the MCU television series would be affected by the events of Infinity War, Loeb said most of the series would take place before that film due to "production and when we are telling our stories versus when the movies come out". James D'Arcy reprises his role of Edwin Jarvis from Agent Carter in the next crossover film after Infinity War, Avengers: Endgame (2019). This marked the first time a character introduced in an MCU television series appeared in an MCU film. Marvel Studios executive Brad Winderbaum stated that during the development of Infinity War and Endgame, the two companies were in communication with each other and easy references to the films were included in Marvel Television series, but to include references to the television series in those films "was just too much for us to wrap our minds around at the time".

Speaking about how the Marvel Television series fit within the larger MCU timeline in May 2019, Loeb said, "We don't want to ever do something in our show[s] which contradicts what's happening in the movies. The movies are the lead dog. They're setting the timeline for the MCU and what's going on. Our job is to navigate within that world." The Roxxon Corporation, which had been featured in the Iron Man films, is referenced in multiple Marvel Television series. Adam Barnhardt of ComicBook.com called it "the go-to Easter egg for most shows involved in the Marvel Television sphere".

=== Under Marvel Studios ===
The magical book the Darkhold appears in the Marvel Studios series WandaVision (2021) with a different design from the one seen in Agents of S.H.I.E.L.D. and Runaways. WandaVision's head writer Jac Schaeffer said there were no "big conversations" among the writers regarding its appearance in the Marvel Television series. Director Matt Shakman believed it was the same book despite the new design. The new Darkhold was designed by the props team of the MCU film Doctor Strange in the Multiverse of Madness (2022), since it appears and has more screentime in that film. The film also shows that multiple copies of the Darkhold exist.

Following the introduction of the multiverse in the first season of Loki (2021), Jack Shephard at Total Film suggested Marvel Studios announce that the Marvel Television series take place on a different timeline within that multiverse since he felt the studio was not taking the events of those series into account as part of the main timeline. In December 2021, Feige announced that Charlie Cox would reprise his role as Matt Murdock / Daredevil from the Netflix shows in future Marvel Studios productions, and Cox first reprised the role in the film Spider-Man: No Way Home (2021). Additionally, D'Onofrio first reprised his role as Kingpin in the Disney+ series Hawkeye (2021), and stated that he was playing the same character from Daredevil. Inhumans star Anson Mount portrayed a version of his character Blackagar Boltagon / Black Bolt from an alternate universe in Multiverse of Madness. Following Cox's appearance on the Disney+ series She-Hulk: Attorney at Law (2022), Marvel.com described the character as "very much the same Matt Murdock audiences have come to know and love".

With the release of The Marvel Cinematic Universe: An Official Timeline book in October 2023, Feige wrote in its foreword that Marvel Studios only considered, at that time, projects developed by them in their first four phases to be part of their "Sacred Timeline", but acknowledged the history of other Marvel films and television series that exist in the larger multiverse; Marvel Television's series were not included in the timeline. In January 2024, Winderbaum acknowledged that Marvel Studios had previously been "a little bit cagey" about what was part of their Sacred Timeline, noting how there had been a corporate divide between what Marvel Studios created and what Marvel Television created. He continued that as time had passed, Marvel Studios began to see "how well integrated the [Marvel Television] stories are" and he personally felt confident in saying Daredevil was part of the Sacred Timeline. Marvel Studios began looking at the Netflix series as a more integral part of the MCU once the reboot series Daredevil: Born Again (2025–present) underwent a creative overhaul and became much more connected to the original Daredevil series. Footage from Daredevil was used in promotional material for Echo, which also features appearances by Cox as Daredevil and D'Onofrio as Kingpin. James Whitbrook at Gizmodo felt these connections and Winderbaum's comments were "vindication" for Daredevil, but also questioned if Marvel Studios' official seal of approval was necessary after characters from the Netflix series started appearing in Marvel Studios projects. To coincide with Echo's release, all of the Netflix series were added to the MCU Disney+ timeline, primarily alongside the MCU's Phase Three content. Acknowledging that Echo has some discrepancies with Kingpin's backstory in Daredevil, D'Onofrio said some things would change slightly moving forward to keep the stories interesting and it was more important to align with the tone of the previous series.

Winderbaum was asked about Agents of S.H.I.E.L.D.'s place in the franchise in August 2024. He praised the series for its connections to the films and acknowledged that Marvel Studios could consider it part of the Multiverse Saga, but he was unwilling to confirm that at the time. In February 2025, Winderbaum said Marvel Studios was open to bringing back more elements from the Netflix series, including the rest of the Defenders, with Jon Bernthal first reprising his role as Frank Castle / Punisher in the first season of Daredevil: Born Again, Krysten Ritter first reprising her role as Jessica Jones in the second season, and Mike Colter and Finn Jones reprising their respective roles as Luke Cage and Danny Rand / Iron Fist in the third season.

== Reception ==
Critical response of Marvel's ABC television series
Title	Season	Rotten Tomatoes	Metacritic
Agents of S.H.I.E.L.D.	1	88% (72 reviews)	74 (33 reviews)
Agents of S.H.I.E.L.D.	2	91% (33 reviews)	—N/a
Agents of S.H.I.E.L.D.	3	100% (22 reviews)	—N/a
Agents of S.H.I.E.L.D.	4	96% (25 reviews)	—N/a
Agents of S.H.I.E.L.D.	5	100% (23 reviews)	—N/a
Agents of S.H.I.E.L.D.	6	93% (15 reviews)	—N/a
Agents of S.H.I.E.L.D.	7	100% (15 reviews)	—N/a
Agent Carter	1	98% (48 reviews)	72 (27 reviews)
Agent Carter	2	76% (21 reviews)	—N/a
Inhumans	1	11% (47 reviews)	27 (20 reviews)

Critical response of Marvel's Netflix television series
Title	Season	Rotten Tomatoes	Metacritic
Daredevil	1	99% (72 reviews)	75 (22 reviews)
Daredevil	2	81% (57 reviews)	68 (13 reviews)
Daredevil	3	97% (67 reviews)	71 (6 reviews)
Jessica Jones	1	94% (81 reviews)	81 (32 reviews)
Jessica Jones	2	82% (89 reviews)	70 (19 reviews)
Jessica Jones	3	73% (40 reviews)	65 (7 reviews)
Luke Cage	1	90% (72 reviews)	79 (30 reviews)
Luke Cage	2	86% (63 reviews)	64 (13 reviews)
Iron Fist	1	20% (85 reviews)	37 (21 reviews)
Iron Fist	2	56% (48 reviews)	39 (6 reviews)
The Defenders	1	78% (100 reviews)	63 (30 reviews)
The Punisher	1	68% (82 reviews)	55 (20 reviews)
The Punisher	2	61% (38 reviews)	58 (6 reviews)

Critical response of Marvel's young adult television series
Title	Season	Rotten Tomatoes	Metacritic
Runaways	1	85% (82 reviews)	68 (22 reviews)
Runaways	2	84% (25 reviews)	—N/a
Runaways	3	83% (12 reviews)	—N/a
Cloak & Dagger	1	89% (54 reviews)	68 (15 reviews)
Cloak & Dagger	2	86% (7 reviews)	—N/a

== Planned or abandoned projects ==
=== Unaired pilots and other series ===
Two unaired pilots were produced but were not picked up to series: Marvel's Most Wanted for ABC and New Warriors for Freeform. Marvel Television had at least four other ABC series planned, along with discussions for potential spin-offs of series at Netflix and for their young adult series.

=== Adventure into Fear franchise ===
Hulu ordered two series based on Ghost Rider and the siblings Daimon and Ana Helstrom in May 2019, intending to build an interconnected universe in a similar fashion to Marvel's Netflix shows. Marvel announced the series as the cornerstone of the "Spirits of Vengeance", and Loeb said they were moving into a "chilling" corner of the Marvel Universe. Loeb revealed in August that Marvel was now referring to these series collectively as "Adventure into Fear", and said more series under the banner were in development. A month later, Hulu decided not to move forward with Ghost Rider due to creative differences. When Marvel Television was folded into Marvel Studios in December, the studio said production on the Daimon and Ana Helstrom series, Helstrom, would be completed but no further series would be developed.

Upon Helstrom's release in October 2020, showrunner Paul Zbyszewski said the series was "our own separate thing" and not part of the MCU, having been "siloed off" in part because of its darker themes. Zbyszewski called it "freeing" to not be part of the MCU. He also said there were Easter eggs in the series that hinted towards the planned Adventure into Fear universe. Unlike Marvel Television's other series, each episode of Helstrom does not begin with the Marvel logo. The series was canceled in December 2020.

== See also ==
- List of Marvel Cinematic Universe television series actors (Marvel Television)
- List of television series based on Marvel Comics publications
- List of Marvel Cinematic Universe television series (Marvel Studios)
- Outline of the Marvel Cinematic Universe § Television series
