= Miles Mussenden =

American actor

- Born: London, England, UK
- Occupations: Actor, music producer
- Years active: 2009-present

Miles Mussenden is an American actor and music producer. He is best known for portraying Otis Johnson in Marvel's Cloak & Dagger on Freeform.

== Career ==
Born in London to Guyanese parents, Mussenden and his family moved to Brooklyn where at the age of nine he began to act in school plays. He was trained at American Academy of Dramatic Arts. After graduating high school, he entered the music business with his friends and formed Two Friends Records and GrassRoots Entertainment where he produced performers such as Shabba Ranks. Since then, he returned to acting eventually getting a recurring role in the show Army Wives. He was cast as Otis Johnson in Marvel's Cloak & Dagger after having made minor appearances in previous Marvel Cinematic Universe productions.

== Personal life ==
Mussenden works with Front & Center, an organization that "works with the Juvenile Courts as an intervention...for at risk youth[s] who have grown up under some really tough circumstances." He teaches a variety of acting techniques and even writing.

== Filmography ==
Film roles
Year	Title	Role	Notes
2009	Muted	Father	Short
2010	Fighting Angels: Exodus	Stone	
2011	The Change-Up	Attorney	Uncredited
2014	Tom Sawyer & Huckleberry Finn	Jim	
2015	Love for Passion	Darryl Love	Short
2015	Max	Captain	
2015	The Atlantan	Antwoine	
2016	Flatbush Luck	Patrick	
2016	Wild Oats	Bernard	
2017	Megan Leavey	DI Villarreal	Uncredited
2017	Spider-Man: Homecoming	Park Ranger	
2017	I, Tonya	Policeman Tate	
2022	The Greatest Inheritance	Lance	
2022	Game Changer	Judge	
2024	Heather	Morris	
2025	Christy	Richard Christmas	

Television roles
Year	Title	Role	Notes
2009	Fighting Angels: The Series	Stone	2 episodes
2010	Gillian in Georgia	Coach Bob	Episode: "Coach"
2010–2013	It's Supernatural	Various	3 episodes
2011	Single Ladies	Federal (FBI) Agent	2 episodes
2011	Reed Between the Lines	Man	Episode: "Let's Talk About Daddy's Little Girl"
2011–2012	Army Wives	Sgt. Bennett Billings	3 episodes
2012	Hidden City with Marcus Sakey	Mark Essex	Episode: "New Orleans"
2013	Second Generation Wayans	Executive Miles	1 episode
2013	Revolution	Captain Winslow	Episode: "Ghosts"
2013	Nashville	Federal Agent	Episode: "Don't Open That Door"
2014	Drop Dead Diva	Federal Agent	Episode: "Desperate Housewife"
2014	Where's the Love?	Tim	Television film
2015	Bloodline	Clive French	2 episodes
2015	Secrets and Lies	Tech Mike	2 episodes
2015	Complications	Foley	Episode: "Outbreak"
2015	Survivor's Remorse	Officer Diston	Episode: "The Date"
2016–2020	Greenleaf	Eugene Driver	2 episodes
2016	Game of Silence	Parole Commissioner Parr	Episode: "Ghosts of Quitman"
2016	The Inspectors	Hamilton Watkins	Episode: "Jamaican Lottery"
2016	Containment	Charlie	Episode: "He Stilled the Rising Tumult"
2016	Hidden America with Jonah Ray	Ayasu	Episode: "Atlanta: Past, Present, Living, and Dead"
2016	Stranger Things	M.P. Officer Patrick	Episode: "Chapter Three: Holly, Jolly"
2016	Ballers	Jeff	Episode: "Laying in the Weeds"
2016	Marvel's Luke Cage	Guard 3	Episode: "Step in the Arena"
2016	Queen Sugar	Boogie	2 episodes
2017	Mr. Mercedes	Fuller	Episode: "Ice Cream, You Scream, We All Scream"
2018–2019	Marvel's Cloak & Dagger	Otis Johnson	Main cast (season 1); guest (season 2); 13 episodes
2020	The Good Lord Bird	Dangerfield Newby	3 episodes
2021	The Walking Dead	Franklin	Episode: "Here's Negan"
2021	The Game	Stan	Episode: "A Taste of Vegas (Part 2)"
2021	Doom Patrol	Lloyd Jefferson / Frenzy	3 episodes
2021–2023	Swagger	Brett Hughes	9 episodes
2022	Players	Rudy Elmore Sr.	Recurring role
2022–2024	Tulsa King	Hendricks	6 episodes
2023	Based on a True Story	Detective Quincy Burrell	4 episodes
2023	The Blacklist	Detective Patrick Fleming	Episode: "The Dockery Affair"
2024–2025	The Irrational	Sam Brown	2 episodes
2026	Cape Fear	Ned Carson	4 episodes
