= Aubrey Joseph =

American actor (born 1997)

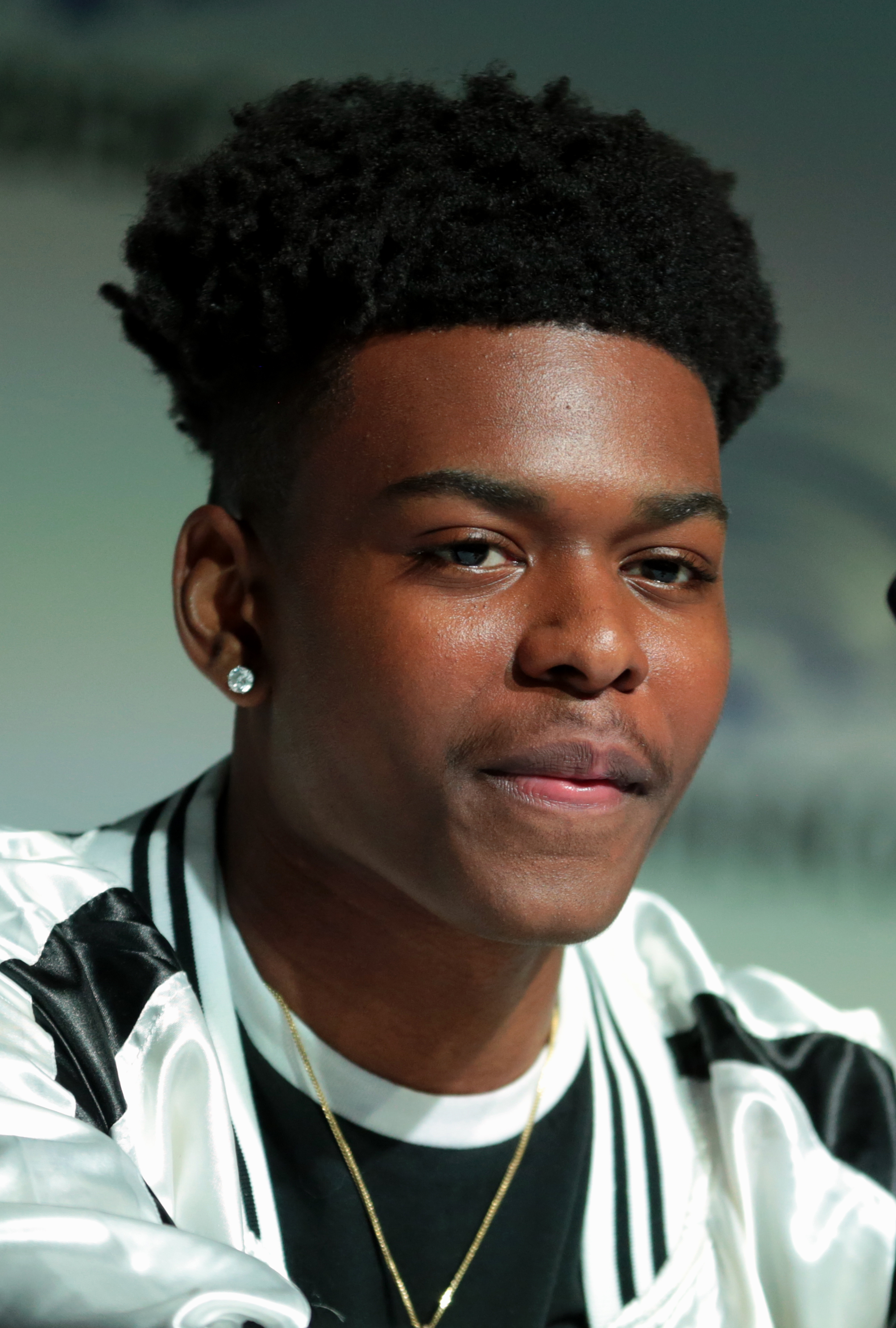
- Aubrey Joseph at WonderCon 2018
- Born: Aubrey Omari Joseph; November 26, 1997 (age 28); Brooklyn, New York City, New York, US
- Education: University of Southern California
- Occupation: Actor
- Years active: 2013–present

Aubrey Omari Joseph (born November 26, 1997) is an American actor best known for his role as Tyrone Johnson / Cloak in Freeform's Cloak & Dagger.

== Career ==
Aubrey started acting on the stage, portraying Simba in the Broadway musical The Lion King, a role he alternated with Judah Bellamy.

Aubrey has his first major, starring role after being cast in January 2017 as Tyrone Johnson / Cloak, one of the lead characters, in the Marvel's Cloak & Dagger television series. The show, set within the larger Marvel Cinematic Universe, aired on Freeform, jointly produced by the network, Marvel Television, based on the Marvel Comics characters of the same name. Aubrey felt his casting was coincidental. "At the time that I got the audition, I was in the middle of trying to watch season one of Luke Cage, so it was crazy just how ironic everything was at that moment." The series ran for two seasons, concluding in May 2019 and was canceled that October. Joseph and his Cloak & Dagger co-star Olivia Holt returned to voice their respective characters on the Disney XD animated series Spider-Man and reprised their roles for a two-episode crossover in the third and final season of Marvel's Runaways. He also starred in Spike Lee's Highest 2 Lowest (2025) alongside Denzel Washington, A$AP Rocky, Ilfenesh Hadera, and Jeffrey Wright.

Aubrey released his debut album, XXl, on July 24, 2020.

== Personal life ==
Aubrey Joseph has an older and a younger brother.

== Filmography ==
Film
| Year | Title | Role | Notes |
|---|---|---|---|
| 2013 | Fading Gigolo | Cefus | |
| 2015 | Run All Night | Curtis 'Legs' Banks | |
| 2017 | A Quaker Sound | Elias | Short film |
| 2018 | The High Bridge | Abel | Short film |
| 2022 | The Inspection | Boles | |
| 2024 | Bosco | Quawntay "Bosco" Adams | |
| 2025 | Highest 2 Lowest | Trey King | |

Television
| Year | Title | Role | Notes |
|---|---|---|---|
| 2014 | Death Pact | Martin | |
| 2014 | Law & Order: Special Victims Unit | Yusuf Barré | Episode: "Amaro's One-Eighty" |
| 2016 | The Night Of | Dwight Gooden Stone | Recurring role; 3 Episodes |
| 2018–2019 | Cloak & Dagger | Tyrone Johnson / Cloak | Main role |
| 2019–2020 | Spider-Man | Tyrone Johnson / Cloak | Episodes: "Cloak and Dagger", "The Cellar", "Vengeance of Venom" |
| 2019 | Runaways | Tyrone Johnson / Cloak | Episodes: "Left-Hand Path", "Devil's Torture Chamber" |
| 2019 | Adult Ed. | Kevin | 2 episodes |
| 2020 | Little Fires Everywhere | Warren Wright | Episode: "The Uncanny" |

== Accolades ==
| Year | Award | Category | Work | Result | Ref. |
|---|---|---|---|---|---|
| 2018 | Teen Choice Awards | Choice Summer TV Star | Cloak & Dagger | Nominated | |
| 2019 | Teen Choice Awards | Choice Sci-Fi/Fantasy TV Actor | Cloak & Dagger | Nominated | |
