= Jaime Zevallos =

Peruvian-American actor and writer

- Born: Lima, Peru
- Occupations: Actor, writer, director
- Years active: 1999–present
- Spouse: Leila Almas Rose

Jaime Zevallos is a Peruvian-American actor and writer. He began his career in the late 1990s and is known for his roles across film and television, including his portrayal of Father Delgado in the Marvel's Cloak & Dagger television series on Freeform. Zevallos has appeared in a wide range of independent films and mainstream television shows, frequently portraying complex and diverse characters.

== Early life ==
Zevallos was born in Peru. His family moved to New York when he was three. He attended Queensborough Community College to study acting and film making of which he taught himself through his dad. "My Dad got me a really cool 8mm video camera and I began shooting skits and editing them on VHS decks." He began to audition for indie projects in New York during which he met "the nicest most gracious people" to help achieve his goal. He also began screenwriting of which he was inspired to do so after reading Woody Allen's Annie Hall script.

Zevallos began booking roles for major television roles such as House, Southland, Off the Map and Sons of Anarchy. He also began writing and producing his own material such as the 2012 film Heartlines.

Zevallos began to lose interest in writing when two of his optioned screenplays were turned down. He worked as a waiter while still auditioning on the side. Eventually he was inspired to write a screenplay after watching When Harry Met Sally. He wrote, directed and starred in You, Me and Five Bucks. The title originated from Reality Bites after a line from Ethan Hawke's character.

== Career ==
In 2018, Zevallos joined the cast of Marvel's Cloak & Dagger as Father Delgado, an ally to the titular characters.

In September 2020, Zevallos was cast along with Zachary Laoutides and Alexander James Rodriguez in the upcoming film Where Sweet Dreams Die.

== Personal life ==
He was named "one of the 25 most influential Latinos in Los Angeles" by Latino Leaders magazine.

== Filmography ==
=== Film ===
Year	Title	Role	Notes
1999	Summer of Sam	NYPD Cop	
2005	Losers of the Year	Skateboarder	Video
2006	The Gleam	Max	
2006	Double Down	Ryan	
2007	Reno 911!: Miami	Police Officer	
2007	Life's Web	Chef	Short
2009	Cloud Gazing	Henry	Video
2009	El americano	Market Goer	Short
2009	Struggle	Chess Winner	Short
2009	Painless: The Dark Side of Hollywood	Gomez	Short
2009	Love, Sex & Drugs	Jack	
2009	Diplomatic Acquisition	Antonio	Short
2010	A Presidential Dilemma	Presidential Assistant 2	Short
2010	The Latin & The Gringo	Jesus	Short
2010	Happy Killers	Killer	Short
2011	Somnolence	-	Short
2011	Blood Canvas	James Pitman	
2011	Wreck	Joel	Short
2011	Maria My Love	Jamie	
2012	Knuckleheads	JP	
2013	Pescado Muerto	Ulises	Short
2013	One Story	Emilio	
2013	Duke	Hector	
2014	Grisly	M-Agent #2	Short
2014	Killing Frisco	Frisco	
2015	American Sharia	Officer Jose	
2015	4am Gas Station Muzak	Rey Bans	Short
2015	The Visions of Daniel	Man in Black	Short
2015	Call Me King	Salvadorian Killer	
2016	Change of Heart	Commander Pence	TV movie
2016	Me You and Five Bucks	Charlie Castillo	
2016	The Vanished	Ray	
2017	The Summoning	Detective Jonathan Silva	
2017	The Ghost and The Whale	Poe	
2018	Guilty Not Guilty	Narrator (voice)	
2018	El Africano	Diego	
2019	Tommy John	Jose Hernandez	Short
2020	A Girl Named Mara	Rudolpho	Short
2021	My Beautiful Bride	Rich Holstein	
2021	A Boy Like That	Harold	
2021	An Intrusion	Detective Castillo	
2021	South of Heaven	Julio	
2021	Christmas vs. the Walters	Ted	
2022	Resurrection	Driver	
2022	Free Dead or Alive	Raul	
2022	Sanctioning Evil	Juan	
2022	Expiration Date	The Man	Short
2022	Under Thy Wings	Uriel	Short
2023	Static Codes	Agent Phillips	
2023	Murder Motel	Officer Tracker	
2023	Captain Estupido	Clark	Short
2023	The Kill Floor	Gil Navarro	Short
2024	Ochoch	Carlos	Short
2024	Notice to Quit	Jaime	
2024	Deep Blue	Arturo Estrada	Short
2025	Soul of a Sister	Landlord	

=== Television ===
Year	Title	Role	Notes
2006	General Hospital	College Student	Episode: "Episode #1.10998"
2006	The Bedford Diaries	Riot Spectator	Episode: "I'm Gonna Love College"
2006	Jericho	Firefighter	Episode: "Fallout"
2006	SamHas7Friends	Chivo Gonzales	Recurring Cast
2007	José Luis Sin Censura	Hector	Episode: "Maria y su jefe tienen relaciones"
2007	Mind of Mencia	Tijuana Officer	Episode: "Episode #3.2"
2007	12 Corazones	Leo	Episode: "Episode #4.10"
2008	Secretos	Gabriel Rojas	Episode: "Bad Sister"
2008	Ingles Ya!	The Husband	Episode: "Opening a Bank Account"
2008	Leverage	Bruiser	Episode: "The Miracle Job"
2010	House	Marcus	Episode: "Small Sacrifices"
2011	Southland	Priest	Episode: "Code 4"
2011	Off the Map	Elan Osario	Episode: "On the Mean Streets of San Miguel"
2012	Sons of Anarchy	EMT	Episode: "Ablation"
2014	Intelligence	Nestor Junaro	Episode: "Delta Force"
2014	The Bridge	Manuel Alcala	Recurring Cast: Season 2
2015	American Horror Story	Kevin	Episode: "She Gets Revenge"
2016	Alternatino	Henchman	Episode: "Buenas Noches with Diego Luca"
2016–17	Animal Kingdom	Scottie Randall	Guest Cast: Season 1–2
2017	Beauty and the Baller	Robert Montana	Recurring Cast
2018–19	Cloak & Dagger	Father Delgado	Recurring Cast: Season 1
2020	The Good Fight	Lieutenant Colonel Jordan Vazquez	Episode: "The Gang Goes to War"
2020	Pandemic Players	Supercast Member	Episode: "Raising Arizona"
2021	Law & Order: Special Victims Unit	Danny Gonzalez	Episode: "Hunt, Trap, Rape, and Release"
2021	Gravesend	Agent Diaz	Recurring Cast: Season 2
2023	Blue Bloods	Gustavo Abreu	Episode: "The Big Leagues"
