= Joe Pokaski =

American TV screenwriter

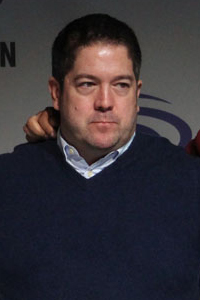
- Pokaski at WonderCon 2018
- Born: United States
- Occupations: Screenwriter, television producer

Joe Pokaski is a writer and television producer known for his work on the television series Marvel's Cloak & Dagger, as well as the television series Underground and Heroes. He has also written Heroes tie-in products, and a number of comics for Marvel Comics.

== Career ==
Joe Pokaski was a writer and Executive Story Editor on the NBC TV series Heroes from 2006 to 2009.

Pokaski and Aron Coleite conducted a weekly interview on Comic Book Resources with Chris Ullrich, George Tramountanas and Emmett Furey, as part of the feature "Behind the Eclipse", in which they discussed the show's writing process, and occasionally revealed upcoming plot developments. Pokaski also wrote twelve issues of the Heroes graphic novel.

Pokaski is the writer of a number of comics for Marvel Comics, including the 2008 miniseries Secret Invasion: Inhumans and the last three issues of Ultimate Fantastic Four, which was part of the "Ultimatum" storyline.

Pokaski served as showrunner and executive producer alongside Misha Green on Underground, which ran for two seasons on WGN America from 2016 to 2017.

In 2016, Pokaski signed on to Marvel's Cloak & Dagger as showrunner and executive producer. Pokaski noted his script had "sat in a drawer for five years", before Freeform executive Karey Burke found it and "took a chance on it". The series received a straight-to-series order for Freeform and Marvel Television. At San Diego Comic-Con in 2018, it was announced that the show was renewed for a second season.

== Filmography ==
=== Showrunner ===
- Underground (with Misha Green)
- Marvel's Cloak & Dagger

=== Writer ===
- Heroes
  - "Shadowboxing"
  - "Hysterical Blindness"
  - "Into Asylum"
  - "Cold Wars"
  - "The Eclipse"
  - "One of Us, One of Them"
  - "Cautionary Tales"
  - "Five Years Gone"
  - "Fallout"
- Crossing Jordan
  - "The Elephant in the Room"
- Daredevil
  - "In the Blood"
  - "Condemned" (co-wrote with Marco Ramirez)
- Underground
  - "The Macon 7" (co-wrote with Misha Green)
  - "War Chest" (co-wrote with Misha Green)
  - "The Lord's Day" (co-wrote with Misha Green)
  - "Firefly" (co-wrote with Misha Green)
  - "Run & Gun" (co-wrote with Misha Green)
  - "Cradle" (co-wrote with Misha Green)
  - "Grave" (co-wrote with Misha Green)
  - "Black & Blue" (co-wrote with Misha Green)
  - "The White Whale" (co-wrote with Misha Green)
  - "Contraband" (co-wrote with Misha Green)
  - "Things Unsaid" (co-wrote with Misha Green)
  - "Ache" (co-wrote with Misha Green)
  - "Whiteface" (teleplay co-written with Misha Green; story by Devon Greggory & Ben Cory Jones)
  - "Minty" (co-wrote with Misha Green)
  - "28" (co-wrote with Misha Green)
  - "Auld Acquaintance" (teleplay co-written with Misha Green; story by Ben Cory Jones)
  - "Citizen" (co-wrote with Misha Green)
  - "Soldier" (co-wrote with Misha Green)
- Cloak & Dagger
  - "First Light"
  - "Suicide Sprints"
  - "Princeton Offense" (co-wrote with Nicole R. Levy)
  - "Lotus Eaters" (co-wrote with Peter Calloway)
  - "Colony Collapse"
  - "Restless Energy"
  - "Vikingtown Sound"

=== Executive Story Editor ===
- Heroes
  - "Kindred"
  - "Lizards"
  - "Four Months Later..."
