= J. D. Evermore =

American actor (active 1996– )

- Born: Greenville, Mississippi
- Occupation: Actor
- Years active: 1996–present

John Daniel Evermore (also credited as JD Evermore) is an American actor. He is known for playing the role of Thomas Silby in Treme, Detective Lutz in True Detective, Harley in The Walking Dead, Carl Daggett in Rectify, Holt in Maggie, and as Dewey Revette in Deepwater Horizon.

== Filmography ==
Film roles
Year	Title	Role	Notes
1998	Stomping Grounds	Spike	
2000	Where the Heart Is	Orderly	
2000	Living the Life	Pilar's Boyfriend	
2002	The Rookie	Relief Pitcher #1	
2003	Rolling Kansas	Angry Motorcycle Cop	
2003	Single and Dealing with It	Robert	
2005	Rainbow's End	Andy	Short film
2005	Walk the Line	F.B.I. Man	
2005	Glorious Mail	Timmy Jones	
2005	Waiting...	Redneck	
2006	Glory Road	East Texas State Fan	
2006	The Guardian	Jailer	
2007	The Great Debaters	Captain Wainwright	
2008	Deal	Tex Button	
2008	Stop-Loss	Rainey	
2008	Who Do You Love?	Jake	
2009	I Love You Phillip Morris	Bossy Guard	
2009	Still Waiting...	Exasperated Customer	
2009	Bad Lieutenant: Port of Call New Orleans	Rick Fitzsimon	
2009	Alabama Moon	Oliver 'Pap' Blake	
2010	The Chameleon	Worker	
2010	Jonah Hex	Terry Jay	
2010	Mysterious Island	Bonaventure Pencroft	
2011	Ticking Clock	Second Cop	
2011	The Mechanic	Gun Runner	
2011	Seconds Apart	CSI Tech	
2011	The Chaperone	Del	
2011	51	Smith	
2011	Never Back Down 2: The Beatdown	Mike's Dad	
2011	Mask Maker	Professor	
2011	Seeking Justice	Man in Elevator	
2011	Inside Out	Baxter	
2011	Jeff, Who Lives at Home	Waiter	
2012	Transit	Sgt. Doucette	
2012	The Philly Kid	Parole Officer	
2012	The Paperboy	Gate Guard	
2012	The Campaign	State Official	
2012	The Baytown Outlaws	Officer Boyd	
2012	Stolen	Rookie	
2012	Django Unchained	Baghead	
2012	Rainbow's End	Andy	Short film
2013	Broken City	Sam's Employee #3	
2013	Beautiful Creatures	Mitchell Wate	Uncredited
2013	The Host	Trevor Stryder	
2013	12 Years a Slave	Chapin	
2013	Dallas Buyers Club	Clint	
2013	Nothing Left to Fear	Helpless Father	
2014	Wicked Blood	Doctor	
2014	Bad Country	Murphy - Captain of the Guards	
2014	Dawn of the Planet of the Apes	Sniper	
2014	Get On Up	Seminar Presenter	
2014	When the Game Stands Tall	Coach #1	
2014	Wild	Clint	
2014	99 Homes	Mr. Tanner	
2015	Maggie	Holt	
2015	Trumbo	Prison Guard	
2015	The Program	Tailwind Executive	
2016	Showing Roots	Raybur	
2016	The Sweet Life	Brandon	
2016	Deepwater Horizon	Dewey A. Revette	
2016	Live by Night	Virgil Beauregard	
2016	River Guard	Ranger	
2018	Assassination Nation	Chief Patterson	
2018	First Man	Chris Kraft	
2019	To the Stars	Len McCoy	
2020	Quiet in My Town	Sheriff Jack Holden	
2021	Palmer	Principal Forbes	
2024	Snack Shack	Bill Workman	

Television roles
Year	Title	Role	Notes
1996	The Big Easy	Valentine	Episode: "Hotshots"
1998	Walker, Texas Ranger	Kyle Finley	Episode: "Saving Grace"
1998	Walker, Texas Ranger	Monte Vole	Episode: "Eyes of a Ranger"
1999	To Serve and Protect	Driver Pete	1 episode
1999	Walker, Texas Ranger	Snake Lipton	Episode: "In Harm's Way: Part 1"; uncredited
2000	Hell Swarm	George Bernard	TV movie
2000	Picnic	Younger Cop	TV movie
2000	At Any Cost	Cop #1	TV movie
2001	CSI: Crime Scene Investigation	Eric	Episode: "Boom"
2001	Walker, Texas Ranger	Patrolman Cross	Episode: "Justice For All"
2002	Days of Our Lives	Lab Technician	1 episode
2004	Infidelity	Andrew	TV movie
2005	Faith of My Fathers	Commander James Latimer	TV movie
2005	Snow Wonder	Joe	TV movie
2006	Thief	Cop	Miniseries; Episode: "Everything That Rises Must Converge"
2006	Not Like Everyone Else	Mr. Gray	TV movie
2006	Prison Break	Woody	2 episodes
2006	Southern Comfort	Det. Jim Hicks	TV Pilot
2007	Ruffian	Saratoga Bettor	TV movie
2010	Memphis Beat	Leonard	Episode: "One Night of Sin"
2010-2013	Treme	Det. Thomas Silby	6 episodes
2011	Miami Magma	Dr. Brad Turner	TV movie
2013	Banshee	Cole Moody	Episode: "Pilot"
2013	Bonnie & Clyde	Sheriff Coffee	Episode: "Part 2"
2013-2016	Rectify	Sheriff Carl Daggett	Recurring (season 1-3); Main cast (season 4)
2014	Star-Crossed	Weeble	Episode: "Pilot"
2014	True Detective	Detective Lutz	Recurring
2014	The Walking Dead	Harley	4 episodes
2014	Salem	Reverend Lewis	Episode: "The Vow"
2015	American Horror Story	Rakes	Episode: "Magical Thinking"
2015	Constantine	The Man	Episode: "Waiting for the Man"
2017	The Son	The Buffalo Hunter	Episode: "The Buffalo Hunter"
2018-2019	Marvel's Cloak & Dagger	Detective James Connors	Main cast
2019	The Purge	Silas Barker	2 episodes
