= Adventure into Fear (franchise) =

Planned group of superhero shows

- Genre: Superhero
- Based on: Characters published by Marvel Comics
- Country of origin: United States
- Original language: English
- No. of series: 1
- No. of episodes: 10

Production
- Executive producers: Joe Quesada; Karim Zreik; Jeph Loeb
- Production companies: Marvel Television; ABC Signature Studios

Original release
- Network: Hulu
- Release: October 16, 2020

Adventure into Fear was a set of American television series planned for the streaming service Hulu, based on characters that appear in publications by Marvel Comics. Produced by Marvel Television and ABC Signature Studios, they were to be standalone series sharing the "same universe" as Marvel's other series but would not cross over with the films and television series of the Marvel Cinematic Universe (MCU).

Following the cancellation of all Marvel's Netflix television series, Hulu ordered a set of interconnected new series from Marvel based on fear-focused Marvel properties in May 2019. Labelled "Adventure into Fear", the series included Ghost Rider—starring Gabriel Luna, reprising his role from ABC's Agents of S.H.I.E.L.D.—and Helstrom, though Ghost Rider was dropped during development. Helstrom stars Tom Austen and Sydney Lemmon, and debuted in October 2020, ultimately being disconnected from the MCU. Several more series were in development for the banner, but Marvel Television stopped work on these when it was folded into Marvel Studios in December 2019. Helstrom was canceled a year later in December 2020.

== Development ==
In May 2019, after all of Marvel's Netflix television series were cancelled by that service, Marvel Television announced that two new series based on Ghost Rider and the siblings Daimon and Ana Helstrom had been ordered straight-to-series by Hulu, which had recently become majority-controlled by Marvel's parent company Disney. The intention was to build an interconnected universe between the two series in a similar fashion to the world created for Marvel's Netflix shows, telling standalone stories that would not cross over with the Marvel Cinematic Universe. A series based on Ghost Rider had been rumored at Marvel Television since the character appeared on their ABC series Agents of S.H.I.E.L.D., but the company did not want to make a spin-off series for the character at ABC because they wanted the series to be more mature than that network would allow; Hulu's series Castle Rock is closer to the tone that Marvel intended for Ghost Rider, so the studio began discussions with Hulu about expanding their slate at the service beyond the young adult series Runaways. Marvel initially referred to the two series as the cornerstone of the "Spirits of Vengeance", with Marvel Television head Jeph Loeb adding that they were moving into a new, "chilling" corner of the Marvel Universe. Luna's Ghost Rider was initially reported to be a "completely new iteration of the character" not connected to his appearance on Agents of S.H.I.E.L.D., though Loeb would later say that the series would "acknowledge what has happened in the past"; the Ghost Rider series was not planned to be a spin-off of Agents of S.H.I.E.L.D.

Loeb said in August that he saw the Hulu series as Marvel Television "arising again" after the Netflix cancellations. He explained that discussions with Hulu regarding Ghost Rider had expanded to "three or four shows" that could be put together in a similar model to the Netflix series, and Marvel was now referring to these collectively as "Adventure into Fear". Loeb said this was not another name for "Marvel Horror" as Marvel was not interested in making horror series in the vein of the Saw franchise, instead wanting to focus on heroes who were feared by others. He added that further series under this banner beyond Ghost Rider and Helstrom were in development. At least two additional series were in development, with the plan to have the four series crossover in a Defenders-style event, with Lilith, Mother of All Demons serving as the antagonist.

A month later, Hulu decided to no longer move forward with Ghost Rider due to creative differences, though Helstrom was still planned to go ahead. When production began on Helstrom in October, Loeb reiterated that it was just the first series of the "Adventure into Fear" franchise. However, Marvel Television was folded into Marvel Studios in December 2019 and stopped development on all new projects. Some Marvel Television executives moved to Marvel Studios to oversee the completion of Helstrom and other series that were already in production. By July 2020, "Marvel's" was removed from Helstrom's title to distance the Marvel brand from the series' horror-based content, not wanting viewers to "stumble upon the show while looking for something in the tone" of the Marvel Cinematic Universe films. The Marvel logo is also not featured before each episode as was the case with Marvel Television's other series, with showrunner Paul Zbyszewski saying this was "a way of telling the audience that this is something different" from the other Marvel series.

== Helstrom (2020) ==
Adventure into Fear television series from Marvel Television
Series	Season	Episodes	Originally released	Network	Showrunner
Helstrom (Note: Production of Helstrom was moved to Marvel Studios following the shut down of Marvel Television, with executives from Marvel Television staying on to supervise the completion of the series.)	1	10	October 16, 2020	Hulu	Paul Zbyszewski

Daimon and Ana Helstrom, the children of a powerful serial killer, hunt down the worst of humanity.

Hulu ordered Helstrom, based on the characters Daimon and Satana Hellstrom, for a 10-episode series in May 2019. Paul Zbyszewski was set as showrunner and executive producer alongside Loeb. The series stars Tom Austen and Sydney Lemmon respectively as Daimon and Ana Helstrom, along with Elizabeth Marvel as Victoria Helstrom, Robert Wisdom as Henry / Caretaker, Ariana Guerra as Gabriella Rossetti, June Carryl as Louise Hastings, and Alain Uy as Chris Yen. Filming began in early October 2019 in Vancouver, and wrapped in March 2020. Helstrom was released on October 16, 2020, and canceled on December 14, 2020. Review aggregator Rotten Tomatoes reported an approval rating of 27% based on 26 reviews, with an average rating of 5/10, while Metacritic, which uses a weighted average, assigned a score of 40 out of 100 based on 9 critics.

Roxxon Corporation, a company that has been featured in the comics and the MCU, is referenced in the series. Regarding the series' place relative to the MCU, Zbyszewski explained that Helstrom is "siloed off" in part because of it being a "darker-themed show", further adding that the series was "not tied to the MCU" and "our own separate thing". Zbyszewski called it "freeing" not being a part of the MCU or its canon, instead "hav[ing] just this little pocket of the universe".

== Abandoned projects ==
=== Ghost Rider ===
On the Texas–Mexico border, Robbie Reyes avenges the innocent by unleashing the demonic Ghost Rider.

During development on the fourth season of Agents of S.H.I.E.L.D., Marvel suggested that the series introduce Ghost Rider, after the character's film rights had returned to Marvel from Sony Pictures in May 2013. The Robbie Reyes version of the character was chosen over other versions from the comics due to his family values, and to help the series distance itself from Sony's Ghost Rider films that starred Nicolas Cage as the Johnny Blaze version of the character. Gabriel Luna was announced to be playing Reyes at the 2016 San Diego Comic-Con. A month later, Marvel Television head Jeph Loeb said the character "could venture into other sections" of the MCU, depending on the audience's response to his appearance in S.H.I.E.L.D. Luna expressed interest in reprising his role outside of the series, adding that he "signed on the line to do all the work necessary". That October, Luna said there had been "rumblings" about a spin-off for the character, but reiterated that it would depend on audience response, though Marvel Television had been keen on a spin-off "almost instantly after the character debuted", executing the hold clause in Luna's contract then to ensure he would be available for any such project.

Hulu ordered Ghost Rider to series in May 2019, with Ingrid Escajeda set as showrunner and executive producer alongside Agents of S.H.I.E.L.D.'s Paul Zbyszewski and Loeb, and Luna reprising his role. Luna reiterated how the series had been in development for some time and he had remained contracted for almost three years with the promise that it would eventually be made. Luna also believed that the announced acquisition of 21st Century Fox by Disney helped provide momentum to finally announce the series. Rather than being a traditional spin-off from S.H.I.E.L.D., Hulu described the series as a new story that "lives unto its own" but is about the same character. The series was set to be a co-production between Marvel Television and ABC Signature Studios. Escajeda was drawn to the series' conflicted characters and horror tone, and said that she would be targeting both existing fans of the property and general audiences with the series. In July, Loeb said the series would reference Reyes's role in Agents of S.H.I.E.L.D. Luna said he had a "really awesome idea" for the series that would have kept Reyes in Los Angeles, and he hoped to include traditional Ghost Rider comic book villains such as Lilith, Mother of All Demons. She would have been introduced before her appearance in the Adventure into Fear crossover event. Agents of S.H.I.E.L.D. visual effects supervisor Mark Kolpack was approached to serve in the same role on Ghost Rider, but ultimately passed because of the series' budgetary restraints. In September, Hulu chose not to move forward with the project due to creative differences. Luna said this news was surprising and he had been "ready to rock" on the series, with pre-production underway including sets being built and scripts being written; Ken Kristensen had been working as a writer and consulting producer on the series, and Dave Blass was set as production designer. Luna said the cancelation was "the nature of this business" and he had "the time of [his] life" playing the character already.

=== Other ===
Loeb stated in August 2019 that there were several "Adventure into Fear" series being developed for Hulu that had not yet been announced, and reiterated this in October. At least two additional series were in development, with the plan to have the four series crossover in a Defenders-style event, with Lilith, Mother of All Demons serving as the antagonist. Marvel had registered trademarks for "Glyph" and "Spirits of Vengeance" by this time. However, by December 2019 Marvel Television was no longer developing new series.

== See also ==
- Marvel's ABC television series
- Marvel's Netflix television series
- Marvel's young adult television series
