= List of frequent Coen Brothers collaborators =

The Coen brothers, a sibling duo of filmmakers, are known for their frequent collaborations with various actors and film crew members. Though they write and direct as a team, for many of their films they split the credits, with Joel Coen as director and Ethan Coen as producer, and the two credited jointly as writers.

== Recurring cast members ==
Joel's wife Frances McDormand is their most frequent acting collaborator

Like many directors, the Coens have frequently cast certain actors in their films. The brothers have most frequently worked with Frances McDormand (8 films); John Goodman (7 films); Steve Buscemi and Jon Polito (5 films each); Bruce Campbell, George Clooney, John Turturro, and Warren Keith and Stephen Root (4 films each); and Michael Badalucco, Josh Brolin and Richard Jenkins (3 times each).

Work Actor	1984	1987	1990	1991	1994	1996	1998	2000	2001	2003	2004	2007	2008	2009	2010	2013	2016	2018	—N/a
Work Actor	Blood Simple	Raising Arizona	Miller's Crossing	Barton Fink	The Hudsucker Proxy	Fargo	The Big Lebowski	O Brother, Where Art Thou?	The Man Who Wasn't There	Intolerable Cruelty	The Ladykillers	No Country for Old Men	Burn After Reading	A Serious Man	True Grit	Inside Llewyn Davis	Hail, Caesar!	The Ballad of Buster Scruggs	Total
Michael Badalucco			Yes					Yes	Yes										3
Josh Brolin												Yes			Yes		Yes		3
Steve Buscemi			Yes	Yes	Yes	Yes	Yes												5
Bruce Campbell					Yes	Yes				Yes	Yes								4
George Clooney								Yes		Yes			Yes				Yes		4
John Goodman		Yes		Yes	Yes		Yes	Yes								Yes			6
Richard Jenkins									Yes	Yes			Yes						3
Warren Keith		Yes				Yes	Yes							Yes					4
Frances McDormand	Yes	Yes	Yes	Yes		Yes			Yes				Yes				Yes		8
Jon Polito			Yes	Yes	Yes		Yes		Yes										5
Stephen Root								Yes			Yes	Yes						Yes	4
John Turturro			Yes	Yes			Yes	Yes											4

== Recurring crew members ==
The Coens similarly tend to collaborate with certain filmmakers as well, especially Roger Deakins, Jess Gonchor, Skip Lievsay, and Mary Zophres. They used cinematographer Barry Sonnenfeld on their first three films, through Miller's Crossing, until Sonnenfeld left to pursue his own directing career. Deakins has been the Coen brothers' cinematographer for all their subsequent films except Burn After Reading, on which they employed Emmanuel Lubezki, and Inside Llewyn Davis and The Ballad of Buster Scruggs, on which they employed Bruno Delbonnel.

Sam Raimi is another frequent collaborator. He helped write The Hudsucker Proxy, which the Coen brothers directed, and the Coen brothers helped write Crimewave, which Raimi directed. Raimi took tips about filming A Simple Plan (1998) from the Coen brothers, who had recently finished Fargo. Raimi has cameo appearances in Miller's Crossing and The Hudsucker Proxy. Raimi and the Coens met when Raimi directed The Evil Dead (1981), for which Joel was hired as an assistant editor.

Carter Burwell has scored all of the Coens' films, although T Bone Burnett produced much of the traditional music in O Brother, Where Art Thou? and The Ladykillers, and was in charge of archive music for The Big Lebowski. Skip Lievsay handles the sound editing for all of the Coens' films.

Most of the Coens' films have been credited to the editor "Roderick Jaynes", an alias which refers collectively to the two Coen brothers. Tricia Cooke, Ethan's wife, was also an editor on three of their films (The Big Lebowski, O Brother, Where Art Thou?, and The Man Who Wasn't There) after working as assistant editor on four of their earlier films (Miller's Crossing, Barton Fink, The Hudsucker Proxy, and Fargo). Michael R. Miller edited Raising Arizona and Miller's Crossing. Katharine McQuerrey worked as an assistant or associate editor on several Coen Brothers productions.
