= Christine Roussel =

American art historian

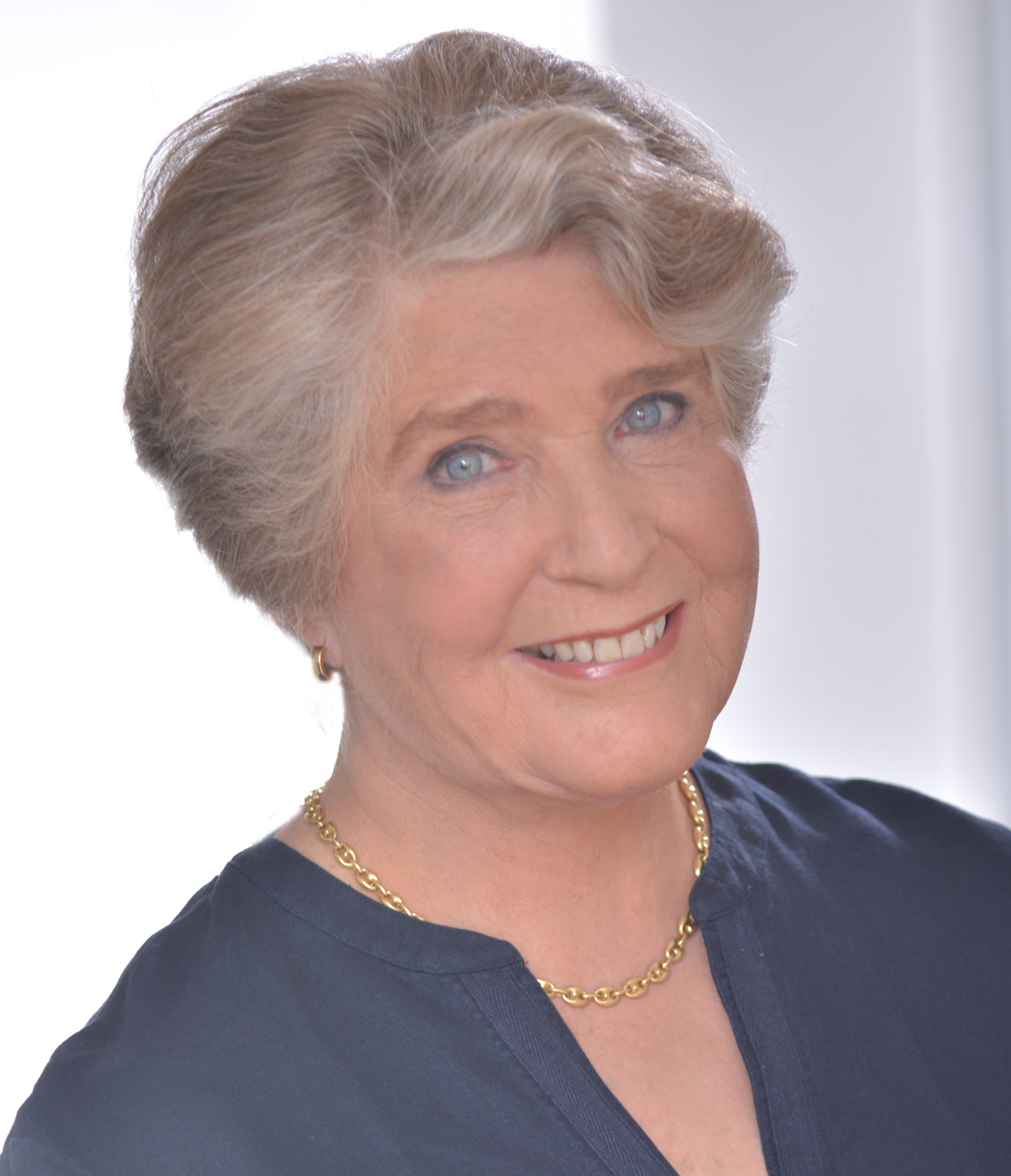
- Roussel in 2014
- Born: Christine Leo; January 20, 1939; New York City, U.S.
- Died: July 2026 (aged 86–87); New York City, U.S.
- Occupation: Art historian
- Relatives: Melissa Leo (niece)

Christine Leo Roussel (née Christine Leo; January 20, 1939 – mid-July 2026) was an American author, art historian, curator, photographer, and consultant. She worked under Thomas Hoving at the Metropolitan Museum of Art and then created her own studio, Roussel Art Conservation. She was known for her knowledge of the artwork of her native New York City, and specialized in sculpture conservation. She was an assistant to Nelson Rockefeller, and was the author of The Art of Rockefeller Center which provides a detailed history of all the works located within Rockefeller Center.

== Early and personal life ==
Christine Roussel was born Christine Leo in New York City, the daughter of Elinore (née Wellington; 1914–2008) and Arnold Leo II. She had two brothers, Roger Leo (1947–2011), a journalist, and Arnold Leo III. Leo III's daughter is Melissa Leo, an actress.

She graduated from The High School of Music & Art in New York City. She then traveled to Europe, living in Greece and France. While living in France she was an apprentice under Ossip Zadkine and studied at the Académie de la Grande Chaumière. She held two master's degrees, in Art and Education from Goddard College in Vermont. She completed her undergraduate work at Wilson College.

Roussel had a son, Marc Roussel, who is also involved in the art industry.

Roussel died at the age of 87 in mid-July 2026, due to complications from Legionnaires' disease.

== Career ==
During her tenure at the Metropolitan Museum of Art working under Thomas Hoving, Roussel worked on the exhibits of King Tutankhamun, traveling to Egypt on several occasions.

She was often called upon to discuss various art works, and was a guest-lecturer at many universities, and appeared in many television programs and magazines as a guest. She received a special award from the National Association of Professional Women for her art conservation work in New York City. Roussel was also a photographer, and her prints have appeared in various books and art exhibits. She was a former board member at the Benaki Museum in Athens, Greece and served on numerous other boards at museums around the world. Her conservation work included restoring the Statue of Liberty and the Reclining Figure, located outside of Lincoln Center. She was also a member of the National Arts Club.
