= Melissa Leo =

American actress (born 1960)

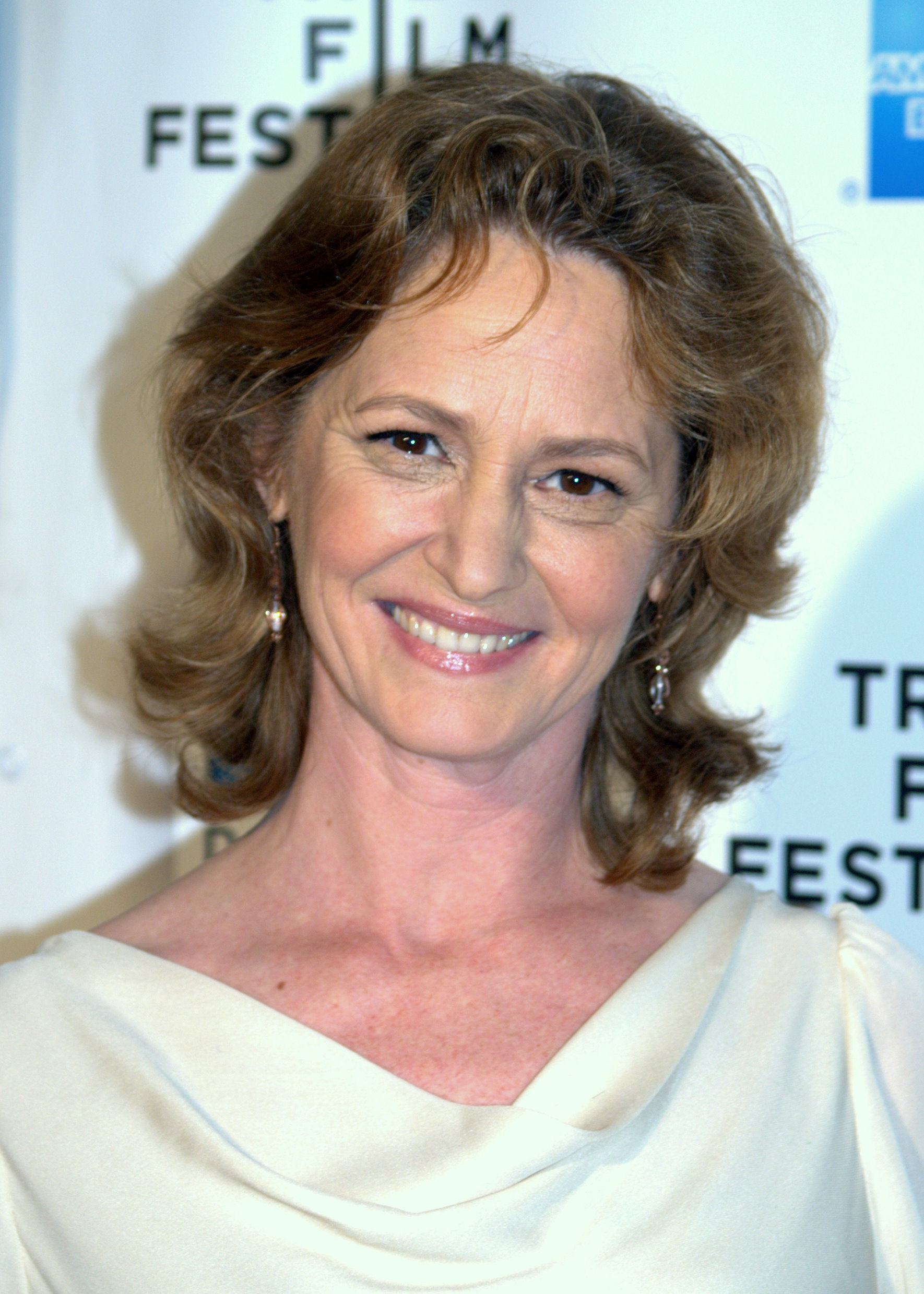
- Leo at the 2009 Tribeca Film Festival
- Born: September 14, 1960 (age 66); New York City, U.S.
- Education: State University of New York, Purchase
- Occupation: Actor
- Years active: 1984–present
- Partner: John Heard (1986–1988)
- Children: 1
- Relatives: Christine Leo Roussel (aunt)

Melissa Chessington Leo (born September 14, 1960) is an American actress. She is the recipient of several accolades, including an Academy Award, a Primetime Emmy Award, a Golden Globe Award, an Actor Award, and two Critics' Choice Awards.

After appearing on several television shows and films in the 1980s, Leo became a regular on the television shows All My Children, for which she was nominated for a Daytime Emmy Award, and The Young Riders. Her breakthrough role came in 1993 as detective and later sergeant Kay Howard on the television series Homicide: Life on the Street (1993–1997).

Leo received critical acclaim for her performance as Ray Eddy in the 2008 film Frozen River, earning her several nominations and awards, including an Academy Award nomination for Best Actress. In 2010, Leo won several awards for her performance as Alice Eklund-Ward in the film The Fighter, including the Academy Award for Best Supporting Actress.

In 2013, she won a Primetime Emmy Award for her guest role on the television series Louie. She starred in the 2015 Fox event series Wayward Pines as Nurse Pam. She then starred in the 2017 Netflix film The Most Hated Woman in America as American Atheists founder Madalyn Murray O'Hair.

== Early life ==
Leo was born in Manhattan and grew up on the Lower East Side. She is the daughter of Margaret (née Chessington), a California-born teacher, and Arnold Leo III, an editor at Grove Press, fisherman, and former spokesman for the East Hampton Baymen's Association. She has an older brother, Erik Leo. Her paternal aunt is art historian Christine Leo Roussel. Leo's parents divorced, and her mother moved them to Red Clover Commune, in Putney, Vermont.

Leo began performing as a child with the Bread and Puppet Theater Company. She attended Bellows Falls High School in Bellows Falls, Vermont, and studied acting at Mountview Academy of Theatre Arts in London and SUNY Purchase, but did not graduate, choosing to leave school and move to New York City to begin auditioning for acting jobs. Leo spent summers at her father's house in Springs, a section of East Hampton, New York.

== Career ==
Leo's acting debut came in 1984, for which she was nominated for a Daytime Emmy at the 12th Daytime Emmy Awards for Outstanding Ingenue/Woman in a Drama Series for All My Children. Following this, Leo appeared in several films, including Streetwalkin', A Time of Destiny, Last Summer in the Hamptons, and Venice/Venice. She also had several appearances on television, most notably her role as Det. Sgt. Kay Howard on Homicide: Life on the Street until 1997. Three years later she reprised her role in the television film Homicide: The Movie. After a brief hiatus from acting, Leo's breakthrough came three years later in the Alejandro González Iñárritu film, 21 Grams released to critical acclaim. Leo appeared in a supporting role alongside Sean Penn, Naomi Watts, Benicio del Toro, and Clea DuVall. Leo shared a Best Ensemble Acting award from the Phoenix Film Critics Society in 2003 and the runner-up for the Los Angeles Film Critics Association for Best Supporting Actress.

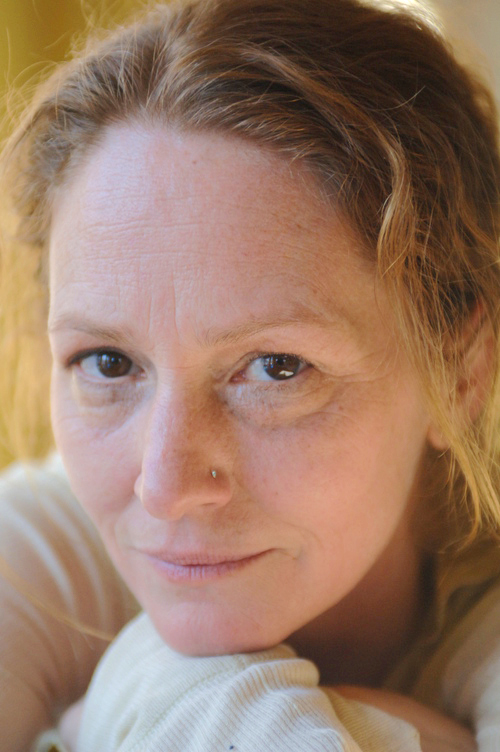
Leo in January 2006

Leo appeared in supporting roles throughout the 2000s including the film Hide and Seek, the independent film American Gun, both in 2005, and a minor role in the comedy Mr. Woodcock. In 2006, she won the Bronze Wrangler at the Western Heritage Awards for Outstanding Theatrical Motion Picture for The Three Burials of Melquiades Estrada shared with Tommy Lee Jones who also produced the film. In 2008, she won the Maverick Actor Award and also the Best Actress award at the Method Fest for Lullaby (2008).

That same year, Leo earned critical praise for her performance in the film Frozen River, winning several awards, including the Best Actress award from the Independent Spirit Awards, the Spotlight award from the National Board of Review, and Best Actress nominations from the Screen Actors Guild Awards, Broadcast Film Critics Association, and Academy Awards. Critic Roger Ebert backed her for a win, stating: "Best Actress: Melissa Leo. What a complete performance, evoking a woman's life in a time of economic hardship. The most timely of films, but that isn't reason enough. I was struck by how intensely determined she was to make the payments, support her two children, carry on after her abandonment by a gambling husband, and still maintain rules and goals around the house. This was a heroic woman."

Following Frozen River, Leo continued to appear in several independent films, and had a minor role in the 2008 film Righteous Kill, with Al Pacino and her Hide and Seek co-star, Robert De Niro. Leo appeared in a series of films throughout 2009, including According to Greta, the title character in Stephanie's Image, True Adolescents, and Veronika Decides to Die.

In 2010, Leo received fame for her role in David O. Russell's The Fighter. Rick Bentley of The Charlotte Observer said: "Both actors (Mark Wahlberg and Christian Bale) are very good, but they get blown off the screen by Melissa Leo, who plays their mother, Alice Ward. Leo's Oscar-worthy portrayal of Alice as a master manipulator goes beyond acting to a total transformation." Roger Ebert referred to it as a "teeth-gratingly brilliant performance." Leo and several of the film's actors including her co-star Amy Adams and Bale were nominated. For her performance Leo received several awards, including the Golden Globe, Dallas-Fort Worth Film Critics Association, New York Film Critics Circle, Screen Actors Guild, and culminating in her winning the Academy Award for Best Supporting Actress. While accepting her Oscar, Leo said: "When I watched Kate two years ago, it looked so fucking easy!" She apologized afterwards for using profanity, admitting that it was "a very inappropriate place to use that particular word ... those words, I apologize to anyone that they offend".

Prior to her win, Leo had created some controversy by attempting to self-promote her Oscar campaign, rather than rely on the marketing department of the studio. Leo personally bought ad space in Hollywood trade publications, which was initially thought might backfire in a similar manner to previous Oscar contenders Chill Wills and Margaret Avery.

Following her Oscar win, Leo appeared in the HBO miniseries Mildred Pierce alongside Kate Winslet, Evan Rachel Wood and Guy Pearce. Her performance garnered an Emmy Award nomination for Outstanding Supporting Actress in a Miniseries or a Movie. Her next projects include the satirical horror film Red State, the independent comedy Why Stop Now with Jesse Eisenberg, and the crime thriller The Dead Circus based on the novel by John Kaye with Michael C. Hall and James Marsden currently in development. She guest-starred in an episode of the hit FX comedy Louie, which garnered her an Emmy win for Outstanding Guest Actress in a Comedy Series.

Leo appeared in the action-thriller Olympus Has Fallen as Ruth McMillan, the Secretary of Defense who was held hostage by terrorists in the White House; and Oblivion as the main antagonist Sally. She reprised her role in the Olympus sequel London Has Fallen.

Leo appeared in supporting roles in the thriller films Prisoners, The Equalizer, and The Equalizer 2, having previously appeared as Russian ballerina Irina Dzershinsky in "The Defector", a 1985 episode of the original series. Leo appeared on the Fox series Wayward Pines as Nurse Pam.

== Personal life ==
In 1987, Leo had a son with actor John Heard, whom she dated from 1986 to 1988, while living in Manhattan.

Leo then moved to Stone Ridge, New York, where a 200-year-old farmhouse was her permanent residence for three decades, though she often traveled and lived elsewhere temporarily for work. In 2019, she moved back to Manhattan. She moved out of the city during the COVID-19 pandemic, but returned in 2023.

Leo publicly rejected the label of feminist in statements made during a 2012 interview with Salon: "I don't think of myself as a feminist at all. As soon as we start labeling and categorizing ourselves and others, that's going to shut down the world. I would never say that." She reiterated these sentiments in a 2017 interview.

== Filmography ==
=== Film ===
Year	Title	Role	Notes
1985	Always	Peggy	
1985	Streetwalkin'	Cookie	
1986	Deadtime Stories	Judith 'Mama' Baer	
1988	A Time of Destiny	Josie Larraneta	
1992	Immaculate Conception	Hannah	
1992	Venice/Venice	Peggy	
1993	The Ballad of Little Jo	Beatrice Grey	
1994	Garden	Elizabeth	
1995	Last Summer in the Hamptons	Trish	
1997	Under the Bridge	Kathy	
1999	The 24 Hour Woman	Dr. Suzanne Pincus	
1999	Code of Ethics	Jo DeAngelo	
2000	Fear of Fiction	Sigrid Anderssen	
2003	21 Grams	Marianne Jordan	
2004	First Breath	Detective Waxman	
2004	From Other Worlds	Miriam	
2005	Hide and Seek	Laura	
2005	Runaway	Lisa Adler	
2005	No Shoulder	Ruth	
2005	Patch	Maelynn	
2005	The Three Burials of Melquiades Estrada	Rachel	
2005	American Gun	Louise	
2005	Confess	Agnes Lessor	
2006	Stephanie Daley	Miri	
2006	The Limbo Room	K.C. Collins	
2006	Hollywood Dreams	Aunt Bee	
2006	The House Is Burning	Mrs. Miller	
2006	Falling Objects	Helga	
2007	Bomb	Sharon	
2007	Midnight Son	Rita	
2007	Black Irish	Margaret McKay	
2007	The Cake Eaters	Ceci	
2007	Racing Daylight	Sadie Stokes / Anna Stokes	
2007	I Believe in America	Soto	
2007	Mr. Woodcock	Sally Jansen	
2007	One Night	Wendy	
2008	Frozen River	Ray Eddy	
2008	The Alphabet Killer	Kathy Walsh	
2008	Lullaby	Stephanie	
2008	Night of the Living Jews	Jewish Mother Zombie	
2008	Santa Mesa	Maggie	
2008	Ball Don't Lie	Georgia	
2008	This is a Story About Ted and Alice	Alice	
2008	Righteous Kill	Cheryl Brooks	
2008	Predisposed	Penny	
2009	According to Greta	Karen	
2009	Stephanie's Image	Stephanie	
2009	True Adolescents	Sharon	
2009	Veronika Decides to Die	Mari	
2009	Dear Lemon Lima	Mrs. Howard	
2009	Don McKay	Marie	
2009	Everybody's Fine	Colleen	
2010	Welcome to the Rileys	Lois Riley	
2010	The Dry Land	Martha	
2010	The Space Between	Montine McLeod	
2010	The Fighter	Alice Eklund-Ward	
2010	Conviction	Nancy Taylor	
2011	Red State	Sarah Cooper	
2011	The Sea Is All I Know	Sara	Short film
2012	Flight	Ellen Block	
2012	Why Stop Now	Penny Bloom	
2012	Francine	Francine	
2013	Olympus Has Fallen	Secretary of Defense Ruth McMillan	
2013	Bottled Up	Fay	
2013	Oblivion	Sally / alien AI	
2013	Lee Daniels' The Butler	Mamie Eisenhower	Scenes deleted
2013	Prisoners	Holly Jones	
2013	Charlie Countryman	Kate Countryman	
2014	The Ever After	Unknown	
2014	The Angriest Man in Brooklyn	Bette Altmann	
2014	The Equalizer	Susan Plummer	
2014	Dwegons and Leprechauns	Grandma Fitz / Butterfly McDweg / Mrs. Fitzgerald	
2015	The Big Short	Georgia Hale	
2016	London Has Fallen	Secretary of Defense Ruth McMillan	
2016	Burn Country	Gloria	
2016	Snowden	Laura Poitras	
2017	Novitiate	Reverend Mother Marie Saint-Clair	
2017	The Most Hated Woman in America	Madalyn Murray O'Hair	
2018	The Ashram	Chandra	
2018	Unlovable	Maddie	
2018	Furlough	Joan Anderson	
2018	The Parting Glass	Al	
2018	The Equalizer 2	Susan Plummer	
2021	Body Brokers	Dr. White	
2021	Thunder Force	Allie	
2021	Ida Red	Ida 'Red' Walker	
2021	Coast	Olivia	
2022	Measure of Revenge	Lillian	
2022	Alone Together	Deborah	
2022	Jane	Principal Rhodes	
2024	The Clean Up Crew	Siobhan	
2024	Long Gone Heroes	Olivia Peterson	
2024	The Knife	Detective Carlsen	
2024	King Ivory	Ginger Greene	
2025	Guns Up	Michael Temple	
2026	Passenger	Diana Larson	
TBA	Supermax †	TBA	Filming

=== Television ===
Year	Title	Role	Notes
1984–1988	All My Children	Linda Warner	38 episodes. Contract cast member (1984–1985)
1985	Silent Witness	Patti Mullen	TV movie
1985	The Equalizer	Irina Dzershinsky	Episode: "The Defector"
1987	Spenser: For Hire	Mary Hamilton	Episode: "Mary Hamilton"
1988	Miami Vice	Kathleen Gilfords	Episode: "Bad Timing"
1989	Gideon Oliver	Rebecca Hecht	Episode: "Kennonite"
1989–1990	The Young Riders	Emma Shannon	24 episodes. Main cast member season 1
1989	Nasty Boys	Katie Morrisey	TV movie
1990	The Bride in Black	Mary Margaret Muldoon	TV movie
1991	Carolina Skeletons	Cassie	TV movie
1993	Law & Order	Alice Sutton	Episode: "Sweeps"
1993–1997	Homicide: Life on the Street	Sergeant Kay Howard	77 episodes. Main cast member seasons 1–5
1994	Scarlett	Suellen O'Hara Benteen	TV miniseries
1995	In the Line of Duty: Hunt for Justice	Carol Manning	TV movie
1998	Legacy	Emma Bradford	2 episodes
2000	Homicide: The Movie	Sergeant Kay Howard	TV movie
2001	Law & Order	Sherri Quinn	Episode: "Who Let the Dogs Out"
2004	Veronica Mars	Julia Smith	Episode: "Meet John Smith"
2004	CSI: Crime Scene Investigation	Sybil Perez	Episode: "Harvest"
2005	Law & Order: Criminal Intent	Maureen Curtis	Episode: "The Good Child"
2005	The L Word	Winnie Mann	3 episodes
2006	Shark	Elizabeth Rourke	Episode: "Pilot"
2007	Criminal Minds	Georgia Davis	Episode: "No Way Out"
2007	Cold Case	Tayna Raymes '94–'07	Episode: "Thrill Kill"
2008	Law & Order	Donna Cheponis	Episode: "Personae Non Gratae"
2010–2013	Treme	Toni Bernette	36 episodes. Main cast member seasons 1–4
2011	Mildred Pierce	Lucy Gessler	TV miniseries. 5 episodes
2012	Louie	Laurie	Episode: "Telling Jokes/Set Up"
2013	Call Me Crazy: A Five Film	Robin	TV movie. Segment: "Grace"
2014–2016	BoJack Horseman	Diane's Mother (voice)	2 episodes
2015	LFE	Julie	TV movie
2015–2016	Wayward Pines	Nurse Pam Pilcher	11 episodes
2016	Broad City	Lori	Episode: "Co-Op"
2016	All the Way	Lady Bird Johnson	TV movie
2017–2018	I'm Dying Up Here	Golda 'Goldie' Herschlag	20 episodes
2019	Heartstrings	Amelia Meegers	Episode: "Two Doors Down"
2020	I Know This Much Is True	Ma	5 episodes

== Stage ==
Year	Title	Role(s)	Notes	Ref.
1982	Don Juan	Ensemble		
1984	Cinders	Stepmother		
1986	Today I Am A Fountain Pen	Annie		
1991	The White Rose	Sophie Scholl		
1998	How I Learned to Drive	Li'l Bit		
1999	Tongue of a Bird	Dessa		
2004	The Distance from Here	Cammie		
2005	The Argument	Sophie		

== Awards and nominations ==
Year	Award	Category	Nominated work	Result
1985	Daytime Emmy Awards	Outstanding Ingenue in a Daytime Drama Series	All My Children	Nominated
2003	Los Angeles Film Critics Association Awards	Best Supporting Actress	21 Grams	Nominated
2003	Phoenix Film Critics Society Awards	Best Cast	21 Grams	Won
2005	Bronze Wrangler Awards	Outstanding Theatrical Motion Picture	The Three Burials of Melquiades Estrada	Won
2008	Academy Awards	Best Actress	Frozen River	Nominated
2008	Actor Awards	Outstanding Performance by a Female Actor in a Leading Role	Frozen River	Nominated
2008	Alliance of Women Film Journalists Awards	Best Breakthrough Performance	Frozen River	Nominated
2008	Central Ohio Film Critics Association Awards	Best Actress	Frozen River	Won
2008	Chicago Film Critics Association Awards	Best Actress	Frozen River	Nominated
2008	Critics' Choice Movie Awards	Best Actress	Frozen River	Nominated
2008	Detroit Film Critics Society Awards	Best Actress	Frozen River	Nominated
2008	Florida Film Critics Circle Awards	Best Actress	Frozen River	Won
2008	Gotham Awards	Breakthrough Actor	Frozen River	Won
2008	Houston Film Critics Society Awards	Best Actress	Frozen River	Nominated
2008	Independent Spirit Awards	Best Female Lead	Frozen River	Won
2008	Los Angeles Film Critics Association Awards	Best Actress	Frozen River	Nominated
2008	Marrakech International Film Festival	Best Actress	Frozen River	Won
2008	National Society of Film Critics Awards	Best Actress	Frozen River	Nominated
2008	New York Film Critics Circle Awards	Best Actress	Frozen River	Nominated
2008	Satellite Awards	Best Actress in a Motion Picture – Drama	Frozen River	Nominated
2008	San Sebastián International Film Festival	Best Actress	Frozen River	Won
2008	Santa Barbara International Film Festival	Best Actress	Frozen River	Won
2008	Utah Film Critics Association Awards	Best Actress	Frozen River	Won
2008	Women Film Critics Circle Awards	Best Actress	Frozen River	Won
2008	Method Fest Independent Film Festival	Best Actress	Lullaby	Won
2010	Tribeca Festival	Best New York Narrative – Special Jury	The Space Between	Won
2010	Academy Awards	Best Supporting Actress	The Fighter	Won
2010	Actor Awards	Outstanding Performance by a Cast in a Motion Picture	The Fighter	Nominated
2010	Actor Awards	Outstanding Performance by a Female Actor in a Supporting Role	The Fighter	Won
2010	Alliance of Women Film Journalists Awards	Best Supporting Actress	The Fighter	Nominated
2010	Boston Society of Film Critics Awards	Best Supporting Actress	The Fighter	Nominated
2010	Boston Society of Film Critics Awards	Best Ensemble Cast	The Fighter	Won
2010	Critics' Choice Movie Awards	Best Cast	The Fighter	Won
2010	Critics' Choice Movie Awards	Best Supporting Actress	The Fighter	Won
2010	Chicago Film Critics Association Awards	Best Supporting Actress	The Fighter	Nominated
2010	Capri Hollywood International Film Festival	Best Actress	The Fighter	Won
2010	Dallas-Fort Worth Film Critics Association Awards	Best Supporting Actress	The Fighter	Won
2010	Denver Film Critics Society Awards	Best Supporting Actress	The Fighter	Won
2010	Detroit Film Critics Society Awards	Best Supporting Actress	The Fighter	Nominated
2010	Florida Film Critics Circle Awards	Best Supporting Actress	The Fighter	Won
2010	Golden Globe Awards	Best Supporting Actress – Motion Picture	The Fighter	Won
2010	Houston Film Critics Society Awards	Best Supporting Actress	The Fighter	Nominated
2010	Iowa Film Critics Awards	Best Supporting Actress	The Fighter	Won
2010	Las Vegas Film Critics Society Awards	Best Supporting Actress	The Fighter	Nominated
2010	New York Film Critics Circle Awards	Best Supporting Actress	The Fighter	Won
2010	New York Film Critics Online Awards	Best Supporting Actress	The Fighter	Won
2010	North Texas Film Critics Association Awards	Best Supporting Actress	The Fighter	Won
2010	Online Film Critics Society Awards	Best Supporting Actress	The Fighter	Nominated
2010	Phoenix Film Critics Society Awards	Best Supporting Actress	The Fighter	Won
2010	San Diego Film Critics Society Awards	Best Supporting Actress	The Fighter	Nominated
2010	San Diego Film Critics Society Awards	Best Ensemble Performance	The Fighter	Nominated
2010	St. Louis Gateway Film Critics Association Awards	Best Supporting Actress	The Fighter	Won
2010	Southeastern Film Critics Association Awards	Best Supporting Actress	The Fighter	Nominated
2010	Toronto Film Critics Association Awards	Best Supporting Actress	The Fighter	Nominated
2010	Utah Film Critics Association Awards	Best Supporting Actress	The Fighter	Nominated
2010	Vancouver Film Critics Circle Awards	Best Supporting Actress	The Fighter	Nominated
2010	Washington D.C. Area Film Critics Association Awards	Best Ensemble	The Fighter	Nominated
2010	Washington D.C. Area Film Critics Association Awards	Best Supporting Actress	The Fighter	Won
2011	California Independent Film Festival	Best Actress	The Sea Is All I Know	Won
2011	Rhode Island International Film Festival	Best Actress	The Sea Is All I Know	Won
2011	Primetime Emmy Awards	Outstanding Supporting Actress in a Miniseries or a Movie	Mildred Pierce	Nominated
2013	Critics' Choice Television Awards	Best Guest Performer in a Comedy Series	Louie	Nominated
2013	Primetime Emmy Awards	Outstanding Guest Actress in a Comedy Series	Louie	Won
2013	National Board of Review Awards	Best Ensemble	Prisoners	Won
2013	San Diego Film Critics Society Awards	Best Performance by an Ensemble	Prisoners	Nominated
2013	Washington D.C. Area Film Critics Association Awards	Best Ensemble	Prisoners	Nominated
2013	Satellite Awards	Best Actress in a Miniseries or TV Film	Call Me Crazy: A Five Film	Nominated
2015	Actor Awards	Outstanding Performance by a Cast in a Motion Picture	The Big Short	Nominated
2015	National Board of Review Awards	Best Ensemble	The Big Short	Won
2016	Critics' Choice Television Awards	Best Supporting Actress in a Movie/Miniseries	All the Way	Nominated
2016	Primetime Emmy Awards	Outstanding Supporting Actress in a Limited Series or Movie	All the Way	Nominated
2017	Satellite Awards	Best Actress in a Miniseries or TV Film	All the Way	Nominated
