= Haiku Tunnel =

2001 film by Jacob Kornbluth

- Directed by: Jacob Kornbluth; Josh Kornbluth
- Written by: Jacob Kornbluth; Josh Kornbluth
- Starring: Josh Kornbluth; Warren Keith
- Distributed by: Sony Pictures Classics
- Release date: 2001
- Running time: 88 minutes
- Language: English

Haiku Tunnel is a 2001 office comedy film about the struggle between temporary and permanent employment.

== Plot ==
Josh is the consummate temp employee, avoiding all long-term connections and responsibilities, both at work and in his personal life. However, by the time his agency places him at the Schuyler & Mitchell law firm, Josh is tired of his temporary life and agrees to take a permanent position at the firm. Josh has difficulty adapting to his new lifestyle, which manifests in his inability to complete his simple initial task: mailing seventeen important letters.

== Cast ==
- Josh Kornbluth as himself
- Warren Keith as Bob 'Bob' Shelby
- Amy Resnick as Mindy
- Harry Shearer as Orientation Instructor
- Leah Alperin as Temp #1
- Jacob Kornbluth as Temp #2
- Stephen Muller as Temp #3
- Linda Norton as Temp #4
- Helen Shumaker as Marlina D'Amore
- Sarah Overman as Julie Faustino
- Brian Thorstenson as Clifford
- June Lomena as DaVonne
- Joanne Evangelista as Caryl
- Jennifer Laske as Helen the Ex-Girlfriend
- Patricia Scanlon as Helen the Ex-Secretary
- Joe Bellan as Jimmy the Mail Clerk
- Michael X. Sommers as Crack Attorney

== Meaning of the title ==
The Haiku Tunnel Project (part of Interstate H-3) is a huge document containing lists of all the products needed for a tunnel in Hawaii. Josh was working in a word processing job when he was given the project. At the time he was "totally-temp" and as he was going through copying this project, he found himself inside the Haiku Tunnel. And now that he finally had what he always wanted (no strings attached) he found himself unhappy.
