= Ariana Guerra =

American actress

- Born: January 8, 1994 (age 32); McAllen, Texas, U.S.
- Occupation: Actress
- Years active: 2014–present

Ariana Guerra is an American actress. She is best known for playing Gabriella Rosetti in the superhero series Helstrom and Serena Chavez in the crime drama series CSI: Vegas.

== Early life ==
Harris was born and raised in McAllen, Texas. She attended the University of Texas at Austin.

== Career ==
Guerra first gained nationwide recognition for her performance as Gabriella Rosetti in the superhero series Helstrom. She played the lead role of Diana in the horror film Madres. Her biggest role so far has been playing detective Serena Chavez in the crime drama series CSI: Vegas. She made a one-off appearance in the drama series Tracker and is currently portraying Yvette Cruz in the upcoming Netflix series Nemesis.

== Personal life ==
In 2022 Guerra along with her friends James Kittleman and Silvia Ruiz organised a donation drive titled the Christmas Acts of Kindness to help several IDEA families and others featured in The Monitor's and United Way of South Texas Spirit of Christmas campaign. The event was held at the University Draft House in McAllen.

== Filmography ==
=== Film ===
Year	Title	Role	Notes
2014	Raising Stakes	Maria	Short
2014	Ana con elisio	Ana	Short
2016	Accidentally Engaged	Kelly Pittman	
2016	Trippin' to the Altar	Alexa	
2016	Mattress	Woman	Short
2017	Mind and Machine	Maya	
2018	Candy Jar	Dana	
2018	Virgin Cheerleaders in Chains	Rosa	
2018	Hollow Scream	April Wilson	
2018	Dumplin	Pageant AD	
2018	The Wannabes	Woman	
2019	Five Feet Apart	Hope	
2021	Madres	Diana	

=== Television ===
Year	Title	Role	Notes
2016	Day 5	Jenn	3 episodes
2016	Crunch Times	Liza Bits	Episode; The Big Sleep
2017	Swamp Murders	Maria Garcia	Episode; Secret Rendezvous
2017	Dead Silent	Rozina Anderson	Episode; Till Death Do Us Part
2018	Dynasty	Assistant#2	
2018	Nashville	Mandy	Episode; Can't Help But Wonder Where I'm Bound
2018	Insatiable	Mean Girl	2 episodes
2019	Raising Dion	Kerry Phillips	3 episodes
2019	Adam Ruins Everything	Adriana	Episode; Adam Ruins Himself
2020	Helstrom	Gabriella Rosetti	10 episodes
2022	Promised Land	Rosa Sanchez	8 episodes
2022	9-1-1	Alyssa	Episode; FOMO
2022-2024	CSI: Vegas	Serena Chavez	31 episodes
2025	Tracker	Amelia	Episode; The Mercy Seat
2026	Nemesis	Detective Yvette Cruz	
