= Helstrom (TV series) =

2020 Marvel Television series

- Genre: Drama; Horror; Superhero
- Created by: Paul Zbyszewski
- Based on: Daimon Hellstrom and Satana by: Roy Thomas; John Romita Sr.; Gary Friedrich; Herb Trimpe
- Showrunner: Paul Zbyszewski
- Starring: Tom Austen; Sydney Lemmon; Elizabeth Marvel; Robert Wisdom; Ariana Guerra; June Carryl; Alain Uy
- Music by: Danny Bensi; Saunder Jurriaans
- Country of origin: United States
- Original language: English
- No. of seasons: 1
- No. of episodes: 10

Production
- Executive producers: Daina Reid; Joe Quesada; Karim Zreik; Jeph Loeb; Paul Zbyszewski
- Producers: Vail Romeyn; Blair Butler; Matt McInnis; Courtney Saladino Gurney; Wendy Willming; Devon Quinn; Melissa Morkus
- Production location: Vancouver
- Cinematography: Bernard Couture; Christopher Charles Kempinski
- Editors: Hunter M. Via; Kelly Stuyvesant; Brian G. Addie; J.D. Sievertson
- Running time: 44–55 minutes
- Production companies: Marvel Television; Lone Lemon Entertainment; ABC Signature Studios

Original release
- Network: Hulu
- Release: October 16, 2020

Related
- Marvel Cinematic Universe television series

Helstrom is an American television series created by Paul Zbyszewski for the streaming service Hulu, based on the Marvel Comics characters Daimon and Satana Hellstrom. The series was produced by Marvel Television and ABC Signature Studios, with Zbyszewski serving as showrunner.

Tom Austen and Sydney Lemmon respectively star as Daimon and Ana Helstrom, the children of a powerful serial killer, who hunt the worst of humanity. Elizabeth Marvel, Robert Wisdom, June Carryl, Ariana Guerra, and Alain Uy also star. Helstrom was officially announced with a series order at Hulu in May 2019, planned as the first series in Marvel Television's Adventure into Fear franchise, which would exist within the continuity of the Marvel Cinematic Universe (MCU) shared universe but would not cross over with that franchise's films or Marvel Television's other series. Upon its release, Zbyszewski stated that Helstrom was not part of the MCU, telling a standalone story. Filming took place in Vancouver from October 2019 until March 2020. Oversight of the series was moved to Marvel Studios in December 2019 when Marvel Television was folded into that company.

Helstrom was released on Hulu on October 16, 2020, and consists of 10 episodes. It was met with largely negative reviews, feeling the characters and plot were uninteresting, though the series' visual effects were considered impressive. Helstrom was canceled on December 14, 2020.

== Premise ==
Daimon and Ana Helstrom, the children of a serial killer, hunt the worst of humanity.

== Cast and characters ==
=== Main ===
- Tom Austen as Daimon Helstrom: An ethics professor who hopes to save those close to him from demons. Nolan Hupp portrays young Daimon.
- Sydney Lemmon as Ana Helstrom: Daimon's sister, who runs an auction house as a cover while hunting people who hurt others. Erica Tremblay portrays young Ana.
- Elizabeth Marvel as Victoria Helstrom / Mother / Lily / Kthara: Daimon and Ana's mother, who has been institutionalized for twenty years.
- Robert Wisdom as Henry / Caretaker: A guardian of the occult who fights demons.
- Ariana Guerra as Gabriella Rosetti: An agent of the Vatican who aids Daimon and Hastings.
- June Carryl as Louise Hastings: Head of the psychiatric hospital where Victoria is institutionalized.
- Alain Uy as Chris Yen: Ana's auction house business partner and surrogate brother.

=== Recurring ===
- Daniel Cudmore as Keith Spivey / Basar: A nurse at the psychiatric hospital where Victoria is institutionalized.
- Deborah Van Valkenburgh as Esther Smith: The leader of the Blood and Caretaker's handler.
- David Meunier as Finn Miller: A member of the Blood.
- Trevor Roberts as Joshua Crow / Raum: A priest who is a victim of demon possession.
- Hamza Fouad as Derrick Jackson: A police officer and Yen's boyfriend.

=== Guests ===
- Sandy Robson as Alex Tilden: A trucker possessed by Magoth.
- Shayn Walker as Ellis: One of Saint Teresa's security guards.
- Zachary S. Williams as Bryce: One of Magoth's vessels.
- Hiro Kanagawa as Sean Okamoto: A priest and acquaintance of Gabriella.
- Camille Sullivan as Zoe and Aubree Richards: Twins who were affected by Daimon and Ana's father.
- Fiona Dourif as Kthara: The demon that possesses Victoria.
- Tom Everett as Terrazi: The archbishop that Hastings answers to.
- Tarun Keram as Lee: Esther's main subordinate.
- Mitch Pileggi as Marduk Helstrom: A serial killer and the father of Daimon and Ana.

== Episodes ==
No.	Title	Directed by	Written by	Original release date
1	"Mother's Little Helpers"	Daina Reid	Paul Zbyszewski	October 16, 2020
Daimon and Ana Helstrom are siblings who live in Portland and San Francisco, respectively. Daimon is a college professor who aids the Saint Teresa Center for Mental Health with cases using his demonic based abilities. At the same time, Ana works as an antique dealer who scours and kills criminals with her psychic powers. Their mother, Victoria, is held in Saint Teresa's due to her demonic possession by a demon named Mother. Her husband was a serial killer Satanist. Daimon is forced to work with Gabriella Rosetti, an agent from the Vatican, by Louise Hastings after an orderly named Keith Spivey disappears following a raid on a demonic tomb. Ana and her ally, the Caretaker, discover a strange skeleton in the tomb, and Ana takes the skull to examine. Gabriella, a skeptic, confronts Mother but has to be rescued by Daimon and Hastings. Daimon finds a symbol his Mother has drawn on the wall, and Ana finds the same symbol on the skull. The siblings reunite at Saint Teresa's. Elsewhere, a demonically possessed Spivey attacks a trucker.
2	"Viaticum"	Anders Engström	Blair Butler	October 16, 2020
The trucker, Alex Tilden, is taken over by a demon named Magoth and is saved by a good samaritan, only to crash their vehicle. Daimon and Ana have a bittersweet reunion as they argue over what to do with Victoria. Daimon wants to save her while Ana wants her dead. Ana has a bad meeting with Victoria when she tries to extract information from her and is scolded by Daimon for being careless. Ana's partner and cohort, Chris Yen, is left to watch the skull and becomes entranced by it. After telling Caretaker where Ana went, Yen has it bite his arm and later kills the brother of one of Ana's victims. Ana goes to speak with Victoria despite Hastings' warnings and learns that Spivey was sent, not to free the demon from its tomb, but to kill it. Victoria tells Ana she was the favorite, presumably of their father. Daimon and Gabriella get called away to deal with Magoth. Alex is slowly dying, so Daimon expels him from his body to save his soul. Magoth warns Daimon of the demon Spivey unleashed, and Alex, in his dying moments, makes peace with his wife and son.
3	"The One Who Got Away"	Michael Offer	Marcus Dalzine	October 16, 2020
Victoria has become more lucid and speaks with Daimon and Ana together. Ana reveals to Daimon that their father is back from the dead to finish what he has started. The siblings and Gabriella head off to meet with Zoe Richards, a survivor of their father's killings. However, Ana deduces that she is lying, as their father left no one alive, and that someone else is in the house, but they are kicked out. Caretaker meets with Hastings, and they catch up on their friendship. Mother sends one of Saint Teresa's patients after Caretaker, but he takes him out easily. He later learns that Hastings has lung cancer and that Gabriella is set to replace her. Daimon and Gabriella go back to the house and discover that the woman they spoke to is Aubree, Zoe's twin sister. Zoe is horrifically burnt and hiding in the basement. She sets the house on fire, but they all escape. Aubree leads Ana into a trap as revenge for her involvement in harming Zoe years ago. Spivey, possessed by the father, instead devours Aubree into himself while Ana escapes with Daimon.
4	"Containment"	Amanda Row	Sheila Wilson	October 16, 2020
Daimon, Ana, Gabriella, Hastings, and Caretaker gather to discuss Daimon and Ana's father's return. Caretaker informs them that the skull can be used against him, so Daimon and Ana head to San Francisco. However, they discover the skull missing and Yen's victim dead at the scene, with Yen himself as the culprit. As they clean up the mess, Ana admits to her vigilante actions. Daimon scolds her but later helps her come to terms with her pain. A possessed Father Crow attacks Gabriella, but Caretaker rescues her, and they take his body to the Blood hideout where they keep possessed victims in comas, horrifying Gabriella. Hastings speaks with Mother, who reveals her name is Kthara, that she has "children" of her own, and that she was the one who gave Hastings her cancer. Gabriella argues with Hastings on their methods but realizes that they have no choice. Daimon and Ana return home and are attacked by Magoth, but expel him from his current host Bryce. Yen takes the skull into a hidden tunnel and slowly begins to lose his sanity.
5	"Committed"	Jovanka Vuckovic	Ian Sobel and Matt Morgan	October 16, 2020
In a flashback, Daimon calls child protective services as a delusional Victoria awaits Ana's return and is committed. Bryce approaches Daimon with what happened to him recently, and he gets Gabriella to come and consult with him on his experience. Victoria is found digging into the floor and gets placed into a coma. They realize that Yen is nearby with the Keeper's skull, and Daimon, Ana, and Caretaker venture into the tunnels underneath. They find Yen, who has lost his sanity, but the Helstroms fight with each other over what to do. They soon catch up with him and knock him out. Victoria is trapped in a nightmarish version of her house with young Daimon and Ana before Kthara reveals herself and asks for protection. Victoria quickly learns that Kthara is hiding from the Keeper and lets him take her, allowing her to awaken. Daimon and Ana converse with their mother though she is unsure if Kthara is gone while Yen is committed. Gabriella takes Daimon to the Blood Hotel to see the patients but discovers that the entire staff has been killed.
6	"Leviathan"	Sanford Bookstaver	Amanda Segel	October 16, 2020
A possessed Spivey injures his wife Jolene. Caretaker is missing as Daimon and Gabriella head back, but must stop at a gas station after getting a flat. They are attacked by the Blood Hotel patients with Daimon having to use his demonic powers to defeat them. Meanwhile, Ana tends to a slowly recovering Yen who still craves the skull. She further reconnects with Victoria; realizing that she truly loved her and understood why she was unaware of their father's treachery. Spivey breaks into Saint Teresa's and kills one of the guards. Hastings discovers the body and puts the hospital on lockdown, but they are trapped inside with the power out. One of Spivey's possessed victims steals the skull from Victoria, but an escaped Yen kills him and retrieves it; willingly giving it to Ana after she admits that she missed her mother. Daimon and Gabriella arrive, but Spivey tries to make off with Victoria. They use the skull to incinerate Spivey. Kthara takes control of Victoria and takes Spivey's remains with Ana realizing that Spivey was not possessed by their father.
7	"Scars"	Bill Roe	Mark Leitner	October 16, 2020
Kthara tends to Spivey's remains, who is possessed by Basar, and decides that they need a new host for him. Daimon and Ana have another argument over recent events that results in Ana taking Yen and heading back to San Francisco. Ana tries to revert to her old vigilante habits, but Yen prevents her, especially when his boyfriend Derrick arrives demanding to know why the police database is being accessed at their workplace. Ana privately tells him that she was paranoid and he forgives her. She breaks down when she nearly drains him, but Yen comforts her. Caretaker has been kidnapped by the Blood who call Daimon demanding a compromise as they do not trust the Helstrom family. Daimon is hesitant when he learns that he and Hastings decided on separating the siblings, but is encouraged by Gabriella. They arrive at the meeting place, but the Blood attack him with the same dagger that marked his chest. Daimon angrily gives in and incinerates some of the members while the rest flee. Gabriella is shocked by Daimon's demonic display.
8	"Underneath"	Cherie Nowlan	Maggie Bandur	October 16, 2020
Daimon and Gabriella take the dagger and warn Ana who has come to help. They later leave it with Hastings and head to the old Helstrom house to retrieve the other half of the dagger. The house is currently on the market and is scouted by Blood Members, forcing Daimon and Gabriella to wait them out. Daimon leaves a trap and appears to be on the verge of killing the members in front of Blood leader Esther Smith. It turns out to be a warning and he leaves the members unharmed and retrieves the dagger piece. Ana convinces Hastings to help try to destroy Kthara with the dagger. They find her hiding place and a struggle ensues with Ana ultimately choosing to suffocate Victoria and then reviving her; finally freeing her from Kthara. Daimon hears the news from Ana and he and Gabriella become intimate. While Daimon showers, Gabriella is suddenly possessed by the spirit of Kthara; having been marked by Spivey earlier. She attacks Daimon and proceeds to have Basar take him over. Afterwards, the two of them have sex to procreate.
9	"Vessels"	Kevin Tancharoen	Ian Sobel and Matt Morgan	October 16, 2020
Gabriella awakens in a sealed off room and learns that she is pregnant. Kthara communicates with her and reveals that she is being reborn inside of her as her pregnancy rapidly goes to full term, but Gabriella manages to escape. Basar in Daimon's body attempts to kill Victoria, but Ana stops him and Hastings and Caretaker seal him in a cell. They realize that Basar's organ was placed into Daimon's back and that to remove it, they need to use the dagger. Victoria talks to Basar and manages to break him down, but Hastings takes her home. Gabriella arrives, but is severely injured from her escape. Yen begins to experience the voices again, sees glyphs forming on his arm and an eyeball in his throat and tries to contact Caretaker. With no other option, Ana tries to use the broken dagger to remove Basar from Daimon, but needs the other half which the Caretaker was going to use for Gabriella's baby. As Kthara's minions arrive to retrieve Gabriella, a fully conscious Daimon attempts to perform an exorcism on himself and savagely knocks himself out.
10	"Hell Storm"	Jim O'Hanlon	Paul Zbyszewski	October 16, 2020
Kthara's minions stab Hastings in the back, sending her to the hospital, while Gabriella escapes and comes in contact with the Blood. Basar takes Daimon over again and escapes. He and the minions take Gabriella peacefully to their hideout. As Ana and Victoria make up, Yen comes to them and Caretaker about his condition and is informed that he is the new Keeper. Yen suddenly has the knowledge on how to fix the dagger and Ana and Victoria put the pieces together. Ana and Yen find the hideout and confront Basar, removing him from Daimon and incinerating him for good. Daimon uses the dagger to kill Raum and Magoth; freeing their vessels. Gabriella gives birth to a girl, but becomes disillusioned and decides to join the Blood. Daimon and Ana decide to raise the baby as they, Victoria, Caretaker and a recovering Hastings celebrate. One month later, Yen is watching an adolescent Kthara when they are approached by a man identified as "Papa". He reminds Kthara that her name is "Lily" and takes her from Yen, while killing innocents, to Yen's horror.

== Production ==
=== Development ===
In May 2019, Hulu ordered Marvel's Helstrom to series, based on the Marvel Comics characters Daimon and Satana Hellstrom; their names are Daimon and Ana Helstrom in the series. Paul Zbyszewski, who previously served as an executive producer on Marvel's ABC series Agents of S.H.I.E.L.D., was set as showrunner and executive producer of Helstrom alongside Marvel Television head Jeph Loeb and Karim Zreik. Marvel Television and ABC Signature Studios were set to co-produce Helstrom alongside Lone Lemon Entertainment. Zbyszewski said the series would be adding "scares" to the Marvel formula of "heart, humor, and action", and that he would use the Helstroms' story to "dissect some of our deepest fears", with Loeb saying the series was moving into a new, "chilling" corner of the Marvel Universe. The series consists of 10 episodes.

In December 2019, Marvel Television was folded into Marvel Studios, with some executives from Marvel Television moving over to Marvel Studios to oversee the completion of production on Helstrom, including Zreik. In April 2020, Marvel terminated Zbyszewski's overall deal with them, in part because of the COVID-19 pandemic, but Zbyszewski continued post-production work on the series. By July, the series was no longer officially titled Marvel's Helstrom, with Disney changing the title to simply Helstrom to distance the Marvel brand from the series' horror-based content, not wanting viewers to "stumble upon the show while looking for something in the tone" of the Marvel Cinematic Universe films. The Marvel logo is also not featured before each episode as was the case with Marvel Television's other series, with Zbyszewski saying this was "a way of telling the audience that this is something different" from the other Marvel series. On December 14, 2020, Hulu canceled the series, making it the final live-action Marvel series produced through Marvel Television, following its absorption back into Marvel Studios.

=== Casting ===
Marvel announced the series' cast at the start of production in October 2019: Tom Austen and Sydney Lemmon star as Daimon and Ana Helstrom, with Elizabeth Marvel as their mother Victoria, Robert Wisdom as Caretaker, June Carryl as Dr. Louise Hastings, Ariana Guerra as Gabriella Rosetti, and Alain Uy as Chris Yen. Daniel Cudmore and David Meunier were cast in the recurring roles as Nurse Keith Spivey and Finn Miller, respectively in November.

=== Filming ===
Production on the series began on October 7, 2019, in Vancouver, under the working title Omens. Filming wrapped on March 14, 2020.

=== Music ===
Danny Bensi and Saunder Jurriaans were revealed to be the composers for the series in October 2020.

=== Relationship to the Marvel Cinematic Universe ===
Hulu and Marvel announced both Helstrom and a Ghost Rider series in May 2019, referring to them as the cornerstone of the "Spirits of Vengeance" and intending on them being interconnected in a similar fashion to Marvel's Netflix television series. The two series were revealed to exist within the continuity of Marvel Television's other series but would not cross over with them or the MCU films. In August, Loeb revealed that the fear-based series at Hulu were being collectively referred to as Adventure into Fear. Hulu was no longer moving forward with Ghost Rider by the end of September, but other Adventure into Fear series were still planned. Development on any further series was cancelled in December 2019 when Marvel Television was shut down.

Roxxon Corporation, a company featured throughout the MCU, is referenced in the series. Josh Bell of Comic Book Resources added that outside of the Roxxon inclusions, the series "bears essentially no connection to the Marvel Cinematic Universe" films or the other Marvel Television series. Regarding the series' place relative to the MCU, Zbyszewski explained that Helstrom is "siloed off" in part because of it being a "darker-themed show", further adding that the series was "not tied to the MCU" and "our own separate thing". Zbyszewski called it "freeing" not being a part of the MCU or its main continuity, instead "hav[ing] just this little pocket of the universe", and said Easter eggs in the series teased plans for the Adventure into Fear franchise before it was canceled.

== Marketing ==
Zbyszewski and the series' cast took part in a panel for the series during the virtual convention Comic-Con@Home in July 2020, where the first teaser for the series was released. An official trailer was released on September 23. Ben Pearson of /Film said the series "looks a lot like something that would have aired on the CW circa 2006. Which, sadly, means it looks kinda terrible". Though he felt there were good actors in Helstrom, he added that the trailer made the series look "super cheap" and "bland". As well, he noted there were hardly any indications it was a Marvel series, and compared it to the film The New Mutants, both "holdover[s] from... different era[s]"–New Mutants with the acquisition of 21st Century Fox by Disney and Helstrom with Marvel Television being dissolved. Hulu released the first 10 minutes of the series at the New York Comic Con online panel held in early October.

== Release ==
Helstrom was released on Hulu on October 16, 2020, as part of Hulu's "Huluween" programming block, consisting of 10 episodes. Internationally, the series premiered on Disney+ under the dedicated streaming hub Star as an original series, on February 23, 2021.

== Reception ==
=== Critical response ===
For the series, review aggregator Rotten Tomatoes reported an approval rating of 27% based on 26 reviews, with an average rating of 5/10. The website's critics consensus reads, "Helstrom's strong visual effects can't save it from the fact that its characters simply aren't interesting enough to overcome their familiar setting." Metacritic, which uses a weighted average, assigned a score of 40 out of 100 based on 9 critics, indicating "mixed or average reviews".

In his review, Bell from Comic Book Resources stated Helstrom "seems to have been completed largely out of contractual obligation" calling it "a generic, dull supernatural drama with a few names that may sound familiar to dedicated comics fans". Bell pointed out the pacing issues the series faced, comparing it to Marvel Television's other streaming series that also faced similar issues, and felt the series had a dull color palette. As well, Helstrom "doesn't much resemble a superhero story, and aside from an occasional swear word and a bit of blood, it could be a mid-level CW supernatural drama about photogenic people going after standard-issue demons." He enjoyed Lemmon as Ana Helstrom, since she was "more charismatic than Daimon" and "the most prominent LGBTQ character in any Marvel TV series to date", but he was disappointed she would not become a fully realized version of her comic counterpart. Because the series was once meant to be part of the planned Adventure into Fear, Bell concluded that Helstrom is "in an uninspired middle ground, and it seems likely to end up as nothing more than a footnote in the history of the MCU". Charles Pulliam-Moore at io9 said, "In another universe, the show's focus on shadowy magics and ugly family drama might make it one of Marvel's standouts, but here the series barely manages to make a strong argument in defense of its own existence." He added it was "telling" that Marvel's name was hardly featured in the series' marketing and the content of the series made it seem like this was by design". Sadie Gennis at TV Guide however found Helstrom the "perfect TV cocktail for right now ... with compelling mythology and morally complicated characters," recommending it as "a horror binge that goes down easy".

=== Accolades ===
Accolades received by Helstrom
Award	Date of ceremony	Category	Recipient	Result	Ref.
Critics' Choice Super Awards	January 10, 2021	Best Actress in a Superhero Series	Elizabeth Marvel	Nominated	
Fangoria Chainsaw Awards	April 18, 2021	Best Series	Helstrom	Nominated	
