= Madres =

2021 horror film directed by Ryan Zaragoza

- Official release poster
- Directed by: Ryan Zaragoza
- Written by: Mario Miscione; Marcella Ochoa
- Produced by: John Brister
- Starring: Tenoch Huerta; Elpidia Carrillo; Kerry Cahill; Ariana Guerra; Jennifer Patino; Britton Webb; Agung Bagus; Betsy Borrego; Evelyn Gonzalez; Jason Bayle; Rose Bianca; Britton Webb; Harlon Miller; Amelia Rico
- Cinematography: Felipe Vara de Rey
- Edited by: Kristina Hamilton-Grobler
- Music by: Isabelle Engman-Bredvik; Gerardo Garcia Jr.
- Production company: Blumhouse Television
- Distributed by: Amazon Studios
- Release date: October 8, 2021
- Running time: 83 minutes
- Country: United States
- Languages: English; Spanish

Madres (lit. 'Mothers') is a 2021 American horror film directed by Ryan Zaragoza in his directorial debut, and written by Mario Miscione and Marcella Ochoa. It stars Ariana Guerra, Tenoch Huerta, Elpidia Carrillo, Kerry Cahill, Agung Bagus, Jennifer Patino, Britton Webb, and Evelyn Gonzalez. The film is the seventh installment in the anthological Welcome to the Blumhouse film series.

Jason Blum serves as an executive producer under his Blumhouse Television banner.

== Plot ==
Diana, heavily pregnant and hoping to write a book while Beto works, dreams of soothing a baby as ominous noises fill a house and a cradle overflows with soil. She wakes in the car as they drive to a remote farming town for his new job. After arriving at their dilapidated home, they visit a local shop where Anita warmly greets them and urges spiritual protection.

After settling uneasily into their new home, Diana grows alarmed by strange noises outside. Beto begins work under Tomas, while Diana confides her frustrations to her sister. Their call is cut short by a loud thud that leads Diana to a shed, where she discovers belongings left by a former tenant—including a music box and clippings about pesticides—before the door suddenly slams shut.

After discovering a severed eye hanging outside their home, Diana attends a neighborhood barbecue where she feels out of place; the women mock her for not speaking Spanish and speak with quiet sadness about their hopes for more children. Enjoying the agua fresca Tomas serves, she accepts a basket to take home. Later, while reviewing Teresa’s notes—including a clipping on Valley Fever—Diana sees a hand appear in the music box’s mirror and falls backward. Shaken, she tells Dr. Bell she’s “seeing things,” and he keeps her overnight, introducing his small clinic staff.

In the clinic, Diana overhears Marisol crying about “la maldición,” but the next morning Marisol remembers nothing. Returning home, Diana finds Beto has cleaned the house, reinforced her chair, and prepared a full nursery. Her mood shifts when he suggests keeping Teresa’s music box. Drawn to Teresa’s research for her writing, Diana studies clippings on sick farmworkers and Valley Fever as new symptoms begin to trouble her.

While researching Teresa’s notes and drinking the agua fresca, Diana develops a rash and experiences a terrifying vision of Teresa appearing before her. Convinced pesticides are harming local women, she asks Anita for help, who insists it is a curse. Diana’s fixation leads to a tense argument with Beto over the risk to his job before they reconcile. After another collapse, she tells Dr. Bell her symptoms may be pesticide‑related, but he attributes them to an unexplained local illness and recommends prayer.

Diana learns from the farmworkers that only women are falling ill, deepening her suspicion that pesticides are responsible. After researching county records, she discovers Hispanic birth rates have collapsed and becomes convinced Teresa died uncovering the truth. Desperate, she and Beto attempt a prayer ritual to test whether a curse is real, but Diana soon suffers another terrifying episode, culminating in a fire and a confrontation with Anita, whom she now believes is endangering her.

During a frantic confrontation with Anita, Diana raises a knife before collapsing, bleeding through her dress and being rushed to the clinic. There she awakens alone, terrified by visions of Teresa and witnesses Marisol forced to sign a form during a medical emergency. Fearing she’ll suffer the same fate, she sends Beto to Arbington, where he learns the town once faced identical pregnancy cases—and that the former doctor responsible was Dr. Bell, deepening their alarm.

Searching Bell’s office, Diana discovers that every woman she met—including Teresa—was coerced into signing sterilization forms, revealing Teresa died during her procedure. She is seized and gassed, awakening strapped to an operating table as Bell admits he has been sterilizing Mexican women. Beto arrives and kills Bell, but Tomas unexpectedly shoots him and reveals the agua fresca was the true poison. As Tomas aims at her, Teresa’s apparition appears, giving Diana the chance to shove him through an interior window, where large glass shards kill him. Diana escapes with her newborn, but Beto dies from his wounds. In the aftermath, Nurse Carol is shown working at a Los Angeles maternity center as archival footage and text detail the real history of forced sterilization in the United States and its persistence into the present day.

== Cast ==
- Tenoch Huerta as Beto
- Elpidia Carrillo as Anita
- Kerry Cahill as Nurse Carol
- Agung Bagus as Man 2
- Rose Bianca as Barbecue guest
- Francesc Tort as Padre
- Ariana Guerra as Diana
- Jennifer Patino as Veronica
- Britton Webb as Man
- Evelyn Gonzalez as Marisol
- René Mena as Rafael Ernesto
- Jason Bayle as Dr. Nelson
- Ashleigh Lewis as Nurse Molly
- Robert Larriviere as Dr. Bell
- Joseph Garcia as Tomas
- Betsy Borrego as Pregnant Woman
- Harlon Miller as Man
- Rachel Whitman Groves as Woman
- Amelia Rico as Gabriela
- Leydi Morales as Rosa
- Sam Fisicaro as Woman
- Sharon Elizabeth Smith as Receptionist
- Gustavo Munoz as Rafael
- Vanessa Motta as Teresa
- Britton Miller as White Man 2
- Harlon as White Man 1

== Release ==
The film was released in the United States on October 1, 2021 by Amazon Studios.

== Reception ==
On review aggregator website Rotten Tomatoes, the film holds an approval rating of 72% based on 18 reviews, with an average rating of 5.80/10. Metacritic assigned the film a weighted average score of 43 out of 100, based on 5 critics, indicating "mixed or average reviews".

=== Accolades ===
Accolades for Madres
Award ceremony	Category	Recipient	Result	Ref.
NAACP Image Awards	Outstanding Writing in a Television Movie or Special	Mario Miscione, Marcella Ochoa	Nominated	
Imagen Foundation Awards	Best Primetime Program - Special or Movie	Madres	Nominated	
Imagen Foundation Awards	Best Actress - Drama (Television)	Ariana Guerra	Nominated	
