= Raising Arizona =

1987 film by Joel and Ethan Coen

- Theatrical release poster
- Directed by: Joel Coen (Note: Although the Coen brothers co-directed this film, Joel received sole credit due to Directors Guild of America regulations)
- Written by: Ethan Coen; Joel Coen
- Produced by: Ethan Coen (Note: Although the Coen brothers both produced this film, Ethan received sole credit due to Directors Guild of America regulations)
- Starring: Nicolas Cage; Holly Hunter
- Cinematography: Barry Sonnenfeld
- Edited by: Michael R. Miller
- Music by: Carter Burwell
- Production company: Circle Films
- Distributed by: 20th Century Fox
- Release date: March 13, 1987
- Running time: 94 minutes
- Country: United States
- Language: English
- Budget: $5.5 million
- Box office: $29.2 million

Raising Arizona is a 1987 American crime comedy film written, directed and produced by Joel and Ethan Coen. It stars Nicolas Cage as H.I. "Hi" McDunnough, an ex-convict, and Holly Hunter as Edwina "Ed" McDunnough, a former police officer and his wife. Other members of the cast include Trey Wilson, William Forsythe, John Goodman, Frances McDormand, Sam McMurray, and Randall "Tex" Cobb.

The Coens wanted to make a film as different from their previous film, the dark thriller Blood Simple, as possible, with a lighter sense of humor and a faster pace. Raising Arizona received mixed reviews at the time of its release, with some criticizing it as too self-conscious, manneristic, and unclear as to whether it was fantasy or realism, while others praised the film for its originality. Retrospective reviews are generally more favorable, and it is now considered to be a cult classic.

Raising Arizona ranks 31st on the American Film Institute's 100 Years...100 Laughs list and 45th on Bravo's "100 Funniest Movies" list. It was released in the United States on March 13, 1987.

== Plot ==
Convenience store robber Herbert ("H.I." or "Hi") McDunnough meets police officer Edwina ("Ed") when she takes his mugshot after each of several arrests in Tempe, Arizona. He learns that Ed's fiancé has left her for a younger woman and, after comforting her over the heartbreak, proposes after release from prison. They marry and move into a desert mobile home, and Hi works in a machine shop. They want children, but Ed is infertile and they cannot adopt due to Hi's criminal record.

Hi and Ed learn of the quintuplet sons born to regional furniture magnate Nathan Arizona. They kidnap one of the babies, whom they believe to be Nathan Jr., intending to start a family. Soon afterward, Hi's former cellmates Gale and Evelle Snoats escape from prison and visit the couple. They persuade Hi to shelter them and tempt him to return to his former criminal life. That night, Hi has a nightmare of monstrous biker Leonard Smalls.

Hi's foreman Glen visits with his large and unruly family the next day. Glen and wife Dot offer parenting advice amid their children's misbehavior and Glen's penchant for racist jokes (especially against Polish people), but when Glen suggests that he and Hi exchange wives, Hi furiously punches Glen in the face. That night, Hi succumbs to robbing a convenience store while buying diapers, leading to a chase with police and a pack of dogs that he manages to outrun. As Ed and Nathan Jr. sleep, Hi decides to leave his family to join Gale and Evelle in a bank robbery.

The next morning, Smalls approaches Nathan Sr. and reveals himself as a bounty hunter. When Nathan Sr. rejects Smalls' offer to bring back Nathan Jr. for $50,000, Smalls decides to do the job anyway and threatens to sell the baby on the black market. Glen returns to fire Hi, revealing his inference that Hi and Ed kidnapped Nathan Jr. Glen threatens to turn them in unless they agree to give the baby to him and Dot. Overhearing this, Gale and Evelle overpower Hi and kidnap Nathan Jr. themselves. Hi and Ed resolve to rescue him.

Gale and Evelle grow attached to Nathan Jr. The two nearly leave him behind while robbing a convenience store, then forget him again during the bank robbery. A dye pack explodes in their stolen money sack, covering them and the getaway car interior with blue dye. The distraction allows Smalls to capture the baby before Hi and Ed arrive. In the ensuing struggle, Ed grabs Nathan Jr. while Smalls severely beats Hi. Hi pulls the pin from one of the hand grenades clipped to Smalls' vest, causing them all to explode and kill Smalls.

Hi and Ed sneak back into the Arizona home to return Nathan Jr. but Nathan Sr. catches them. Nathan Sr. sympathizes with their motives and decides not to report them to the authorities. Learning that Hi and Ed are considering a divorce after all they've been through, he suggests that they think about it first.

While sleeping beside Ed that night, Hi has a series of prophetic dreams. Gale and Evelle return to prison, having realized that they are not ready for society and now desire to reform like Hi did; Glen is arrested by a Polish-American police officer who is unamused by the ethnic jokes he tells; and Nathan Jr. becomes a high school football star with Hi and Ed anonymously watching and encouraging him. Later he dreams of an elderly couple with a large, wholesome family, and wonders whether this was a vision of him and Ed, or of Utah.

== Cast ==
- Nicolas Cage as Herbert I. (H.I.) "Hi" McDunnough
- Holly Hunter as Edwina "Ed" McDunnough
- Trey Wilson as Nathan Arizona, Sr.
- John Goodman as Gale Snoats
- William Forsythe as Evelle Snoats
- Sam McMurray as Glen
- Frances McDormand as Dot
- Randall "Tex" Cobb as Leonard Smalls
- T.J. Kuhn, Jr. as Nathan Junior
- Lynne Dumin Kitei as Florence Arizona
- Warren Keith and Henry Kendrick as FBI agents
- M. Emmet Walsh as Machine Shop Ear-Bender

== Production ==
=== Casting and conception ===
The Coen Brothers started working on Raising Arizona with the idea to make it as different as possible from their previous film, Blood Simple, by having it be far more optimistic and upbeat. The starting point of scriptwriting came from the idea of the character of Hi, who has the desire to live a regular life within the boundaries of the law. To create their characters' dialect, Joel and Ethan created a hybrid of local dialect and the assumed reading material of the characters, namely, magazines and the Bible. In contrast to Blood Simple, the characters in Raising Arizona were written to be very sympathetic. The Coens wrote the character Ed for Holly Hunter. The character of Leonard Smalls was created when the Coen Brothers tried to envision an "evil character" not from their imagination, but one that the character would have thought up. His name is sometimes interpreted as a reference to the character of Lennie Small, from John Steinbeck's novella Of Mice and Men. John Goodman was drawn to characters of "great feeling, [guys] who could explode or start weeping at any moment" and became a frequent collaborator following his performance as Gale Snoats. The script took three and a half months to write.

A send-up of the screwball comedy, the film was influenced by the works of director Preston Sturges and writers such as William Faulkner and Flannery O'Connor (who was known for her Southern literature; "She also has a great sense of eccentric character," Ethan Coen told one interviewer). Joel and Ethan showed the completed script to Circle Films, their American distributor for Blood Simple. Circle Films agreed to finance the movie. The Coens came to the set with a complete script and storyboard. With a budget of just over five million dollars, Joel Coen noted that "to obtain maximum from that money, the movie has to be meticulously prepared".

=== Filming ===
Raising Arizona was shot in ten weeks beginning on February 3, 1986, and lasting till April 25. Principal photography took place in Phoenix, Scottsdale, and Tempe, Arizona. Many crew members who had worked with Joel and Ethan on Blood Simple returned for Raising Arizona, including cinematographer Barry Sonnenfeld, co-producer Mark Silverman, production designer Jane Musky, associate producer and assistant director Deborah Reinisch, and film composer Carter Burwell.

The relationship between actor Nicolas Cage and the Coens was respectful, but turbulent. When he arrived on-set, and at various other points during production, Cage offered suggestions to the Coen brothers, which they ignored. Cage said that "Joel and Ethan have a very strong vision and I've learned how difficult it is to accept another artist's vision. They have an autocratic nature." Randall "Tex" Cobb also gave the Coens difficulty on set, with Joel noting that "he's less an actor than a force of nature ... I don't know if I'd rush headlong into employing him for a future film."

== Release ==
Raising Arizona was initially released in the United States, three dates; A New York City premiere on March 6, 1987, a limited release on March 13, 1987, and a nationwide release on April 17, 1987. The film was also released in Argentina on March 25, 1987, before it was screened out of competition at the 1987 Cannes Film Festival.

Despite the cult following of their later films, such as The Big Lebowski, in 2000 Ethan Coen described their second feature as "the last movie [we] made that made any significant amount of money".

== Reception and legacy ==
On review aggregator Rotten Tomatoes, the film holds an approval rating of 91% based on 67 reviews. The website's critical consensus reads, "A terrifically original, eccentric screwball comedy, Raising Arizona may not be the Coens' most disciplined movie, but it's one of their most purely entertaining." On Metacritic, the film has a weighted average score of 69 based on 23 reviews, indicating "generally favorable reviews". Audiences polled by CinemaScore gave the film an average grade of "B" on an A+ to F scale.

David Denby of New York wrote that the film was a "deranged fable of the New West" which turned "sarcasm into a rude yet affectionate mode of comedy". Richard Corliss of Time referred to the film as "exuberantly original". Rita Kempley of The Washington Post gave a positive review, stating that it was "the best kidnapping comedy since last summer's Ruthless People". On the film review television show Siskel & Ebert & the Movies, critic Gene Siskel said the film was as "good looking as it is funny" and that "despite some slow patches" he recommended the film, giving it a "thumbs up". Writing for The New Yorker, Pauline Kael wrote that "Raising Arizona is no big deal, but it has a rambunctious charm".

Negative reviews focused on a "style over substance" view of the film. Variety wrote, "While [Raising Arizona] is filled with many splendid touches and plenty of yocks, it often doesn't hold together as a coherent story." Writing for The New York Times, Vincent Canby wrote, "Like Blood Simple, it's full of technical expertise but has no life of its own ... The direction is without decisive style." Julie Salamon of the Wall Street Journal wrote that the Coen Brothers "have a lot of imagination and sense of fun—and, most of all, a terrific sense of how to manipulate imagery," but "by the end, the fun feels a little forced." Dave Kehr of the Chicago Tribune wrote that "the overlooked form peels away from the slight, frail content, and the film starts to look like an episode of Hee Haw directed by an amphetamine-crazed Orson Welles". Roger Ebert wrote a negative review, stating the film "stretches out every moment for more than it's worth, until even the moments of inspiration seem forced. Since the basic idea of the movie is a good one and there are talented people in the cast, what we have here is a film shot down by its own forced and mannered style."

Later writings about the film have been generally positive. Both the British film magazine Empire and film database Allmovie gave the film five stars, their highest ratings. Allmovie's Lucia Bozzola wrote, "Complete with carefully modulated over-the-top performances from the entire cast, Raising Arizona confirmed the Coens' place among the most distinctive filmmakers to emerge from the 1980s independent cinema", while Caroline Westbrook of Empire declared it a "hilarious, madcap comedy from the Coen brothers that demonstrates just why they are the kings of quirk". Bilge Ebiri considers Raising Arizona to be "the Coens' masterpiece — their funniest movie, and quite possibly their most poignant as well". The Dutch magazine Vrij Nederland placed its bank robbery scene second on their list of "the 5 best bank robberies in film history", behind the bank robbery scene from the 1995 thriller Heat. Actor Simon Pegg described the film as "a living, breathing Looney Tunes cartoon" during a BFI screening. Pegg's friend and frequent collaborator Edgar Wright has stated that Raising Arizona is his favorite film of all time. Likewise, Spike Lee put Raising Arizona on his "Essential Films" list.

The film is recognized by American Film Institute:

- 2000: AFI's 100 Years...100 Laughs – No. 31

== Soundtrack ==
Original Motion Picture Soundtracks: Raising Arizona and Blood Simple

Soundtrack album by Carter Burwell
- Released: 1987
- Genre: Film score
- Length: 39:26
- Label: Varèse Sarabande

The score to Raising Arizona is written by Carter Burwell, the second of his collaborations with the Coen brothers. The sounds are a mix of organ, massed choir, banjo, whistling, and yodeling.

Themes are borrowed from the Goofing Off Suite, originally recorded by Pete Seeger in 1955, which includes an excerpt from the Chorale movement of Ludwig van Beethoven's Symphony No. 9 and "Russian Folk Themes and Yodel". Credited musicians for the film include Ben Freed (banjo), Mieczyslaw Litwinski (Jew's harp and guitar), and John R. Crowder (yodeling). Holly Hunter sings a traditional murder ballad, "Down in the Willow Garden", as an incongruous "lullaby" during the film.

Selections from Burwell's score to Raising Arizona were released on an album in 1987, along with selections from the Coens' sole previous feature film, Blood Simple. The tracks from Raising Arizona constitute the first ten tracks on a 17-track CD that also features selections from the Blood Simple soundtrack.

1. "Introduction – A Hole in the Ground" – (0:38)
2. "Way Out There (Main Title)" – (1:55)
3. "He Was Horrible" – (1:30)
4. "Just Business" – (1:17)
5. "The Letter" – (2:27)
6. "Hail Lenny" – (2:18)
7. "Raising Ukeleles" – (3:41)
8. "Dream of the Future" – (2:31)
9. "Shopping Arizona" – (2:46)
10. "Return to the Nursery" – (1:35)

AllMusic gave the album a rating of (4.5 out of 5).

== Bibliography ==
- Levine, Josh (2000). The Coen Brothers: The Story of Two American Filmmakers. Toronto, Canada: ECW Press. ISBN 978-1-55022-424-5.
