= CSI: Vegas =

American television series

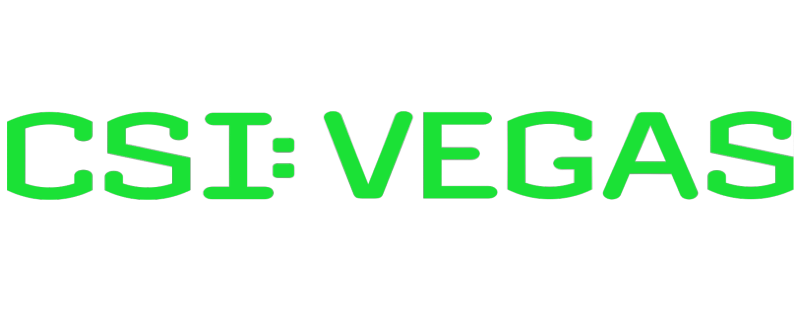
- Genre: Police procedural; Crime drama
- Based on: CSI: Crime Scene Investigation by Anthony E. Zuiker
- Developed by: Jason Tracey
- Starring: Paula Newsome; Matt Lauria; Mandeep Dhillon; Mel Rodriguez; Jorja Fox; William Petersen; Ariana Guerra; Jay Lee; Lex Medlin; Marg Helgenberger
- Opening theme: "Who Are You" by The Who
- Composer: John M. Keane
- Country of origin: United States
- Original language: English
- No. of seasons: 3
- No. of episodes: 41

Production
- Executive producers: Anthony E. Zuiker; Cynthia Chvatal; Jason Tracey; Jerry Bruckheimer; Jonathan Littman; KristieAnne Reed; William Petersen; Craig S. O'Neill; Carol Mendelsohn; Ann Donahue; Uta Briesewitz
- Running time: 42–45 minutes
- Production companies: Jerry Bruckheimer Television; Trace Pictures; CBS Studios

Original release
- Network: CBS
- Release: October 6, 2021 – May 19, 2024

Related
- CSI: Crime Scene Investigation; CSI: Miami; CSI: NY; CSI: Cyber; Cold Case; Without a Trace

CSI: Vegas (Crime Scene Investigation: Vegas) is an American crime drama series that aired on CBS on October 6, 2021. It is a revival of the 2000–15 series CSI: Crime Scene Investigation and the fifth and final series in the CSI franchise. The series stars Paula Newsome, Matt Lauria, Mandeep Dhillon, and Mel Rodriguez as new characters. William Petersen and Jorja Fox reprised their roles from CSI: Crime Scene Investigation as Gil Grissom and Sara Sidle during the first season before departing, while Marg Helgenberger reprises her CSI: Crime Scene Investigation role as Catherine Willows beginning with season two. Wallace Langham, Paul Guilfoyle and Eric Szmanda also reprise their roles as David Hodges, Jim Brass and Greg Sanders, in a guest capacity.

Originally branded as an epilogue limited series, the show was renewed for a second season in December 2021, without Fox, Petersen, or Rodriguez returning. The first season consisted of ten episodes. The second season premiered on September 29, 2022, consisting of 21 episodes. On February 21, 2023, CBS renewed CSI: Vegas for a shortened third season, consisting of ten episodes.

On November 13, 2023, CBS announced the premiere date for its shows. The third season premiered on February 18, 2024, moving to Sunday nights. In April 2024, the series was canceled after three seasons. The series finale aired on May 19, 2024.

== Cast ==
Actor	Character	Occupation	First Episode	Final Episode	Seasons		
Actor	Character	Occupation	First Episode	Final Episode	1	2	3
Paula Newsome	Maxine "Max" Roby	Director of The Crime Lab	"Legacy"	"Tunnel Vision"	M	M	M
Matt Lauria	Joshua "Josh" Folsom	CSI Level III	"Legacy"	"Tunnel Vision"	M	M	M
Mandeep Dhillon	Ahalya "Allie" Rajan	CSI Level III	"Legacy"	"Tunnel Vision"	M	M	M
Mel Rodriguez	Dr. Hugo Ramirez	Chief medical examiner	"Legacy"	"Signed, Sealed, Delivered"	M		
Jorja Fox	Sara Sidle	Crime investigator	"Legacy"	"Signed, Sealed, Delivered"	M		
William Petersen	Gil Grissom	Crime investigator	"Legacy"	"Signed, Sealed, Delivered"	M		
Marg Helgenberger	Catherine Willows	Crime investigator	"She's Gone"	"Tunnel Vision"		M	M
Ariana Guerra	Serena Chavez	Homicide detective	"She's Gone"	"Tunnel Vision"		M	M
Jay Lee	Christopher "Chris" Park	CSI Level I	"She's Gone"	"Tunnel Vision"		M	M
Lex Medlin	Beau Finado	CSI Level I	"She's Gone"	"Tunnel Vision"		M	M

=== Main ===
- Paula Newsome as Maxine "Max" Roby, head of the Las Vegas Crime Lab.
- Matt Lauria as Joshua "Josh" Folsom, a CSI Level III who is typically the lead investigator on cases. He was demoted to Level I in season 3 after going rogue to avenge his mother's murder, but reinstated at the end of the series finale.
- Mandeep Dhillon as Ahalya "Allie" Rajan, a CSI recently promoted to Level III who is an immigrant that followed her dreams to Las Vegas.
- Mel Rodriguez as Dr. Hugo Ramirez, the Chief Medical Examiner (season 1).
- Jorja Fox as Sara Sidle (season 1).
- William Petersen as Gil Grissom (season 1).
- Ariana Guerra as Serena Chavez, a homicide detective (seasons 2–3).
- Jay Lee as Christopher "Chris" Park, a CSI Level I (seasons 2–3; recurring season 1).
- Lex Medlin as Beau Finado, a CSI Level I (seasons 2–3).
- Marg Helgenberger as Catherine Willows (seasons 2–3).

=== Recurring ===
- Wallace Langham as David Hodges (season 1)
- Chelsey Crisp as Emma Hodges, David's wife (season 1)
- Jamie McShane as Anson Wix, a corrupt civil attorney (season 1)
- Sarah Gilman as Penelope "Penny" Gill, a CSI
- Sean James as Will Carson, a homicide detective
- Kat Foster as Nora Cross, an Internal Affairs detective (season 1; guest: season 3)
- Robert Curtis Brown as Undersheriff Cade Wyatt (season 1)
- Luke Tennie as Bryan Roby, Maxine's son
- Kathleen Wilhoite as Dr. Diane Auerbach (season 2)
- Sara Amini as Dr. Sonya Nikolayevich, chief medical examiner (season 2; guest season 3)
- Joel Johnstone as Jack Nikolayevich, assistant medical examiner and Sonya's older brother (season 2-3)
- Sherri Saum as Jodi Wallach, a board member of the Eclipse Casino (season 2)
- Katie Stevens as Lindsey Willows (season 2)
- Derek Webster as Dr. Milton Hudson, substitute medical examiner (seasons 2–3)
- Rob Morgan as Daniel Jordan, Maxine's ex-husband (season 2)
- Eric Szmanda as Greg Sanders (season 2)
- Lolita Davidovich as Jeannette Folsom, Josh's mother (season 2)
- Daniel di Tomasso as Trey Cahill, Folsom's childhood friend (season 2)
- Reggie Lee as Undersheriff Zhao (season 3)

=== Guest Star ===
- Paul Guilfoyle as Jim Brass (season 1)

== Episodes ==
=== Series overview ===
Season	Episodes	Originally released		Rank	Viewers (in millions)
Season	Episodes	First released	Last released	Rank	Viewers (in millions)
1	10	October 6, 2021	December 8, 2021	30	6.80
2	21	September 29, 2022	May 18, 2023	36	5.66
3	10	February 18, 2024	May 19, 2024	30	6.15

=== Season 1 (2021) ===
No. overall	No. in season	Title	Directed by	Written by	Original release date	Prod. code	U.S. viewers (millions)
1	1	"Legacy"	Uta Briesewitz	Jason Tracey	October 6, 2021	101	4.12
An attack on Jim Brass brings Gil Grissom and Sara Sidle out of retirement, only for them to uncover a conspiracy that could jeopardize the Las Vegas crime lab and lead to the release of thousands of convicted killers.
2	2	"Honeymoon in Vegas"	Nathan Hope	Jason Tracey	October 13, 2021	102	3.91
While Grissom and Sara try to help a former colleague implicated in evidence tampering, the CSI team investigates the murder of a couple on their wedding day and finds a link to the dark side of the Las Vegas elite.
3	3	"Under the Skin"	Nathan Hope	Craig O'Neill	October 20, 2021	103	3.54
As Grissom and Sara continue their investigation into charges against David Hodges, the CSIs investigate the murder of a video game developer found in a fountain before a gaming tournament.
4	4	"Long Pig"	Nicole Rubio	Safia M. Dirie	October 27, 2021	104	3.34
The CSI team investigates when a body is dug up in the luau pit of a Hawaiian-themed hotel. Also, Internal Affairs begins to question Grissom and Sara's return to the crime lab.
5	5	"Let the Chips Fall"	Kenneth Fink	Graham Thiel	November 3, 2021	105	3.22
A cargo plane lands safely, but with everyone on board dead. Meanwhile, Grissom and Sara get closer to the person suspected of framing Hodges, only to find that he has been killed and is thus not the mastermind.
6	6	"Funhouse"	Benny Boom	Samantha Humphrey	November 10, 2021	106	3.24
CSI goes on lockdown when evidence in a murder tips off Grissom and Sara to a new suspect in the crime lab. Meanwhile, the CSIs investigate a series of murders at a dilapidated clown-themed hotel.
7	7	"In the Blood"	Christine Moore	Marisa Tam	November 17, 2021	107	3.88
A lost horse is found in front of a hotel with human blood and a boot on it. The police's search leads them to a halfway house for murder convicts. Meanwhile, Grissom and Sara positively identify Wix as the mastermind behind Hodges' case, as his sister brags that Wix will never be apprehended for the crime.
8	8	"Pipe Cleaner"	Benny Boom	Safia M. Dirie & Samantha Humphrey	November 24, 2021	108	4.20
The CSIs investigate human remains found in a convention center owner's bathtub. Meanwhile, Grissom and Sara use the opportunity to get closer to Wix's star witness.
9	9	"Waiting in the Wings"	Christine Moore	Craig O'Neill & Jason Tracey	December 1, 2021	109	3.95
The CSIs delve into the eccentric world of sideshows when a couple of performers are found burned in a pit. Meanwhile, Hodges thinks over a plea deal as his trial begins; Max, Grissom, and Sara look for evidence to exonerate him.
10	10	"Signed, Sealed, Delivered"	Kenneth Fink	Jason Tracey & Craig O'Neill	December 8, 2021	110	3.55
When Hodges goes missing, the CSIs must search for evidence that can locate him, clear his name, and save the reputation of the crime lab. Hodges is found alive and Wix is charged.

=== Season 2 (2022–2023) ===
No. overall	No. in season	Title	Directed by	Written by	Original release date	Prod. code	U.S. viewers (millions)
11	1	"She's Gone"	Kenneth Fink	Jason Tracey	September 29, 2022	201	3.19
Catherine Willows persuades Maxine Roby to let her join the CSI team. Meanwhile, the CSIs investigate the murder of a dominatrix found near her secret sex dungeon.
12	2	"The Painted Man"	Sam Hill	Craig O'Neill	October 6, 2022	202	3.24
As Halloween descends on Las Vegas, the CSIs investigate a popular haunted house when a mannequin prop turns out to be a real dead body. Catherine enlists help from Folsom to locate her missing friend.
13	3	"Story of a Gun"	Antonio Negret	Safia M. Dirie	October 13, 2022	203	3.24
A group of teens stumble across a dead woman behind the wheel of an abandoned car in a Nevada ghost town.
14	4	"Koala"	Claudia Yarmy	Anthony E. Zuiker	October 20, 2022	204	3.61
When three masked assailants invade a home and murder an entire family, the team is called to the scene to investigate; Catherine leads the team through the emotional case, which intensifies her own longing to reconnect with her estranged daughter.
15	5	"In Harm's Way"	Lin Oeding	Graham Thiel	October 27, 2022	205	3.57
CSI is called to investigate after a number of guests suddenly grow ill, with three people dying, at a banquet celebrating the sale of a university-developed medical technology to a defense contractor. Meanwhile, Catherine enlists Grace's roommate to find clues following Grace's disappearance.
16	6	"There's the Rub"	Mario Van Peebles	Jordana Lewis Jaffe	November 3, 2022	206	3.14
CSI is called to Dario, a high-end casino's flagship steakhouse, to investigate the murder of the restaurant's eponymous celebrity chef.
17	7	"Burned"	Benny Boom	Tom Szentgyörgyi	November 10, 2022	207	3.46
The CSI team is puzzled by a mysterious bigfoot-like footprint near a crime scene as they determine who - or what - murdered a father and son.
18	8	"Grace Note"	Gina Lamar	Erika Vázquez & Siena Butterfield	December 8, 2022	208	3.27
Catherine becomes more frustrated when the lead suspect in Grace's disappearance is found dead. The CSI team uses all their skills to find the killer, hoping his death will lead them to Grace.
19	9	"In the White Room"	Kenneth Fink	Marisa Tam & Graham Thiel	December 15, 2022	209	3.48
The CSIs investigate the murders of two Regency Romantic Festival attendees and uncover a shocking link between their murders and previous cases.
20	10	"Eyeballs"	Allison Liddi-Brown	Ryan Lee	January 5, 2023	210	3.36
Chris Park leads the team when a popular guest is murdered following a social media influencer party.
21	11	"Trinket"	Ruben Garcia	Safia M. Dirie	January 12, 2023	211	3.43
While the rest of the team searches for the missing mother of a young boy after he is found hiding in a garage, Max is sent a familiar, cryptic note written in silver ink.
22	12	"When the Dust Settles"	Rachel Raimist	Jordana Lewis Jaffe	February 2, 2023	212	3.80
The team investigates a dust-coated crime scene from four years earlier after the only survivor of an attack at a beauty salon awakens from a coma.
23	13	"Boned"	Erin Feeley	Dave Metzger	February 9, 2023	213	3.82
After the skeletal remains of two people are found next to a creek, Allie discovers that one of them dates back to the Neolithic ages. Meanwhile, a seemingly open-and-shut case of self-defense leads to confusion as Max finds another link to the Silver Ink murders.
24	14	"Third Time's the Charm"	Eduardo Sánchez	Tom Szentgyörgyi	February 16, 2023	214	2.93
When a man in an alley dies with three seemingly conflicting causes of death, Folsom must track down the murderer. Meanwhile, Max and Allie follow a lead to their main suspect in the Silver Ink murders.
25	15	"Ashes, Ashes"	Stephanie Marquardt	Marisa Tam	March 2, 2023	215	3.21
After the main suspect in the Silver Ink murders is found dead, the lives of the CSI team are put on the line as they delve deeper into the true motive behind the killings.
26	16	"We All Fall Down"	Ray Daniels	Craig O'Neill & Graham Thiel	March 9, 2023	216	3.34
Molly Tate, a prior survivor of the Silver Ink murderer, is killed and her body booby-trapped with a mysterious poison, hospitalizing Sonya during the autopsy. Meanwhile, the team attempts to find an antidote and decipher the strange silver ink symbols.
27	17	"The Promise"	Brad Tanenbaum	Alex Berry & Anthony E. Zuiker	March 30, 2023	217	3.26
Max confronts a grieving and angry mother when the remains of her young daughter are found dumped inside a drum at Lake Mead. Meanwhile, Greg Sanders returns to the crime lab to offer his assistance to the team.
28	18	"Fractured"	Gina Lamar	Liz Castricone & Safia M. Dirie	April 13, 2023	218	3.39
The team investigates at a pop-up outdoor masquerade party in the desert celebrating the construction of an upcoming casino after an explosion winds up killing three people in the blast. Meanwhile, Folsom stumbles into a predicament when a dead body is found at his friend’s apartment.
29	19	"Dead Memories"	Pam Veasey	Craig O'Neill	May 4, 2023	219	3.18
Allie’s judgement is tested when Gene Farrow, a former suspect from the Painted Man murder, walks into the crime lab covered in blood and wielding a cleaver. Meanwhile, Max sees a therapist to help her cope with her anger issues following her assault. Also, Folsom has trouble connecting with his estranged mother after the arrest of his childhood friend Trey.
30	20	"Shell Game"	Omar Madha	Marisa Tam	May 11, 2023	220	3.29
As the team investigates the death of a local meteorologist found inside a nut processing factory, Max contemplates who to promote to Dayshift Supervisor. Also, Folsom struggles to balance his relationship with Chavez while investigating his mother’s drug problems.
31	21	"Dying Words"	Jason Tracey	Jason Tracey	May 18, 2023	221	2.76
Folsom spirals into an emotional frenzy when his mother is found murdered inside a warehouse. After reuniting with Trey, they both set out to hunt for the killer. The episode ends when the main suspect is found dead in a dumpster and Josh surrenders and is arrested.

=== Season 3 (2024) ===
No. overall	No. in season	Title	Directed by	Written by	Original release date	Prod. code	U.S. viewers (millions)
32	1	"The Reaper"	Brad Tanenbaum	Jason Tracey & Craig O'Neill	February 18, 2024	301	4.09
Folsom’s future hangs in the balance as the rest of the team questions his innocence following his surrender, while simultaneously being under pressure from the notorious crime family responsible for Jeanette’s murder.
33	2	"Scar Tissue"	Nicole Rubio	Jordana Lewis Jaffe	February 25, 2024	302	4.16
Catherine’s recent involvement with the Tarquenio family triggers a memory from five years earlier that may be the only clue to bringing them down. Also, Folsom is acquitted of all charges, but Nora Cross returns to CSI to investigate his questionable actions.
34	3	"Rat Packed"	Omar Madha	Marisa Tam	March 3, 2024	303	4.37
The team investigates the world of celebrity impersonators when two dead bodies resembling Frank Sinatra and Joey Bishop are found rotting within a wall. Also, Max has to decide Josh’s future at CSI.
35	4	"Health and Wellness"	Stephanie Marquardt	Tom Szentgyörgyi	March 17, 2024	304	4.30
After an unusually carved body is discovered inside the basement of an abandoned hospital, Allie is trapped at the crime scene when an explosion separates her from the rest of the team. When more bodies are discovered inside, CSI faces the possibility of a serial cannibal roaming Las Vegas.
36	5	"It Was Automation"	Ruben Garcia	Dave Metzger	March 24, 2024	305	4.56
CSI is called to investigate the death of a man killed inside an automated kinematics research facility but, when one of the dozen humanized androids at the scene is coated in the victim’s blood, the team questions if the robot’s AI is inherently capable of murder or was purposely reprogrammed to do so.
37	6	"Atomic City"	Kenneth Fink	Ryan Lee	April 21, 2024	306	4.09
A massive leak of uranium leaves a father and son dead in their home, forcing CSI to take additional precautions as they try to find the source, motive, and killer while investigating the radioactive crime scene. Meanwhile, Max continues to investigate the murder at the kinematics research facility, finding additional evidence leading to another culprit.
38	7	"Coinkydink"	Safia M. Dirie	Safia M. Dirie	April 28, 2024	307	4.19
When a fitness instructor is killed in a sauna and his soon to be son-in-law shot dead in the Nevada mountains within the same night, and the only other connection between the two cases is a series of freak accidents leading to their deaths, the team attempts to separate the superstition from the evidence. Also, Chavez goes undercover to help Max with the unsolved case at Mojave Kinematic Designs.
39	8	"The Artist is Present"	Gina Lamar	Gabriel Ho	May 5, 2024	308	4.10
While Chavez and Max search for a missing suspect in their ongoing investigation of Mojave Kinematic Designs, the rest of the team is called to investigate the bizarre and gruesome discovery of an intact human nervous system put on display at a local car dealership.
40	9	"Heavy Metal"	Tom Camarda	Camille D'Elia	May 12, 2024	309	4.16
Penny takes charge of her first homicide case when a man stumbles into oncoming traffic with an unusual gunshot wound and no primary crime scene. Meanwhile, Catherine, Chris, and Max continue to investigate Mojave Kinematic Designs; their findings lead them to an underground science facility, along with a massive discovery that confirms their conspiracy.
41	10	"Tunnel Vision"	Erin Feeley	Erika Vázquez & Siena Butterfield	May 19, 2024	310	4.25
In the series finale, Max is kidnapped and Chris is hospitalized following an ambush at a Mojave Kinematic Designs facility, leaving the rest of the team to find their boss and her captors within a labyrinth of neighboring underground tunnels before it’s too late.

== Production ==
=== Development ===
Following the airing of the series finale of CSI: Crime Scene Investigation in 2015, series creator Anthony E. Zuiker said the future of the characters would be that "Grissom and Sara ... [would still be] sailing the oceans, ... saving the environment, ... [would have] children, and they would dedicate their lives to the betterment of humanity. ... Catherine would still be running the crime lab, ... [Brass] probably would retire, ... and DB probably is working in the private sector in Washington DC. And I think that all these characters would still have their toe in the crime water."

Soon after the cancellation of the last series in the franchise, CSI: Cyber, in 2016, it was announced that the producers were open to reviving the franchise. The CBS Entertainment president at the time, Glenn Geller, said, "We are incredibly proud of all CSI shows. It may come back in another incarnation." On February 10, 2020, it was announced that an event series sequel to CSI: Crime Scene Investigation was being discussed, from Jason Tracey, CBS Studios, and Jerry Bruckheimer Television, with Tracey, Jerry Bruckheimer, and Jonathan Littman as executive producers.

On August 10, 2020, it was announced that the series was still in development, now titled CSI: Vegas, with the original star of CSI: Crime Scene Investigation, William Petersen, set to executive produce alongside Tracey, Bruckheimer, Littman, KirstieAnne Reed, Zuiker, Craig O'Neill, and Cynthia Chvatal. In February 2021, the series was nearing a formal straight-to-series order. It was also announced that although it is being billed as an event series, it could become an ongoing series airing multiple seasons.

On March 31, 2021, it was announced that CSI: Vegas had officially been ordered to series, with Uta Briesewitz directing the pilot. On December 15, 2021, CBS renewed the series for a second season. CBS Entertainment president Kelly Kahl confirmed that the second season will be longer than 13 episodes, although the network currently has "not done a final tally yet". In October 2022, Anthony E. Zuiker teased that the second season will consist of at least 17 episodes. It was later revealed that the season would comprise 21 episodes in total. On February 21, 2023, CBS renewed CSI: Vegas for a third season, which premiered on February 18, 2024, consisting only 10 episodes. On April 19, 2024, CBS canceled the series after three seasons.

=== Casting ===
On February 10, 2020, it was announced that two of the original stars of CSI: Crime Scene Investigation, Petersen and Jorja Fox, were in talks to potentially reprise their roles as Gil Grissom and Sara Sidle. On August 10, 2020, it was announced that Petersen and Fox were still in negotiations to return, and that casting was under way for five new characters.

On February 12, 2021, it was revealed that Paula Newsome, Matt Lauria, and Mel Rodriguez had been cast in the series. Lauria and Rodriguez both previously guest-starred as different characters in the franchise. It was also revealed that Petersen and Fox were finalizing their deals. On March 31, 2021, it was announced that Mandeep Dhillon had been cast in the series.

Later that day, it was revealed that Wallace Langham would reprise his role as David Hodges, and Petersen and Fox were officially announced as being cast. On May 3, 2021, it was announced that Jamie McShane had been cast in a recurring role and that Paul Guilfoyle would reprise his role as Jim Brass in two episodes. In September 2021, Zuiker hinted that additional CSI: Crime Scene Investigation characters may make appearances in the series.

On December 15, 2021, it was announced alongside the second season renewal that Petersen won't return as a cast member, though he would remain as executive producer. On January 25, 2022, it was announced that Fox will also not return for the second season. Two days later, it was announced that Rodriguez would leave ahead of the second season as well. On February 11, 2022, it was announced that Marg Helgenberger would reprise her role as Catherine Willows in the second season. On May 24, 2022, it was announced that recurring actor Jay Lee would be upgraded to series regular and that Lex Medlin and Ariana Guerra would join the cast as regulars. On December 15, 2022, it was reported that Eric Szmanda would reprise his role as Greg Sanders in several episodes during the latter half of the second season.

=== Filming ===
On August 10, 2020, it was announced that filming was planned to start in the fall of 2020, whenever COVID-19 conditions permitted Hollywood production to resume. On January 8, 2021, it was announced that the series is set to begin production in early 2021. Filming began May 4, 2021, and was scheduled to run until November 4, 2021, in Los Angeles, California. On August 22, 2021, it was reported that Petersen had been taken to a hospital after becoming ill during filming.

== Release ==
=== Broadcast ===
The series was originally planned to air on October 6, 2020, to mark 20 years since the day of the premiere of CSI: Crime Scene Investigation. However, on August 10, 2020, it was announced that due to COVID-19 related production shutdowns, the series would not be able to meet that premiere date. On January 8, 2021, it was announced that the series was set to air during the 2021–22 television season. On May 19, 2021, CBS announced that the series would premiere in fall 2021, on Wednesdays at 10 p.m. ET. On July 12, 2021, a premiere date of October 6, 2021, was announced by CBS, to mark 21 years since the day of the premiere of CSI: Crime Scene Investigation. The first season comprises ten episodes.

==== Outside the United States ====
The first season was premiered on Alibi in July 2022, with the second season premiering in December 2022 in the United Kingdom. The series also aired in many Asian territories and Latin America on AXN.

== Home media ==
Season	Episodes	DVD release dates			
Season	Episodes	Region 1	Region 2	Region 4	Discs
1	10	April 5, 2022	November 14, 2022	TBA	3
2	21	August 22, 2023	TBA	TBA	5
3	10	September 3, 2024	TBA	TBA	2

== Reception ==
=== Ratings ===
==== Overall ====
Viewership and ratings per season of CSI: Vegas
Season	Timeslot (ET)	Episodes	First aired		Last aired		TV season
Season	Timeslot (ET)	Episodes	Date	Viewers (millions)	Date	Viewers (millions)	TV season
1	Wednesday 10:00 p.m.	10	October 6, 2021	4.12	December 8, 2021	3.55	2021–22
2	Thursday 10:00 p.m.	21	September 29, 2022	3.19	May 18, 2023	2.76	2022–23
3	Sunday 10:00 p.m. (1–4, 6–10); Sunday 9:00 p.m. (5)	10	February 18, 2024	4.09	May 19, 2024	4.25	2023–24

==== Season 1 ====
Viewership and ratings per episode of CSI: Vegas
No.	Title	Air date	Rating/share (18–49)	Viewers (millions)	DVR (18–49)	DVR viewers (millions)	Total (18–49)	Total viewers (millions)
1	"Legacy"	October 6, 2021	0.5	4.12	0.3	2.60	0.8	6.73
2	"Honeymoon in Vegas"	October 13, 2021	0.4	3.91	0.4	3.01	0.8	6.92
3	"Under the Skin"	October 20, 2021	0.4	3.54	0.4	3.29	0.8	6.83
4	"Long Pig"	October 27, 2021	0.4	3.34	0.3	2.48	0.7	5.83
5	"Let the Chips Fall"	November 3, 2021	0.3	3.22	0.2	2.33	0.5	5.55
6	"Funhouse"	November 10, 2021	0.4	3.24	0.2	2.43	0.6	5.67
7	"In the Blood"	November 17, 2021	0.4	3.88	0.4	3.09	0.8	6.97
8	"Pipe Cleaner"	November 24, 2021	0.5	4.20	0.4	3.20	0.9	7.40
9	"Waiting in the Wings"	December 1, 2021	0.4	3.95	0.3	2.62	0.7	6.58
10	"Signed, Sealed, Delivered"	December 8, 2021	0.4	3.55	0.4	3.09	0.7	6.64

==== Season 2 ====
Viewership and ratings per episode of CSI: Vegas
No.	Title	Air date	Rating/share (18–49)	Viewers (millions)	DVR (18–49)	DVR viewers (millions)	Total (18–49)	Total viewers (millions)
1	"She's Gone"	September 29, 2022	0.3	3.19	0.3	2.44	0.6	5.63
2	"The Painted Man"	October 6, 2022	0.3	3.24	0.2	2.32	0.5	5.56
3	"Story of a Gun"	October 13, 2022	0.3	3.24	0.3	2.29	0.6	5.53
4	"Koala"	October 20, 2022	0.3	3.61	0.2	2.25	0.5	5.86
5	"In Harm's Way"	October 27, 2022	0.3	3.57	0.3	2.39	0.6	5.96
6	"There's the Rub"	November 3, 2022	0.3	3.14	0.3	2.54	0.6	5.69
7	"Burned"	November 10, 2022	0.3	3.46	0.3	2.41	0.5	5.86
8	"Grace Note"	December 8, 2022	0.3	3.28	0.1	1.99	0.4	5.29
9	"In the White Room"	December 15, 2022	0.2	3.48	—N/a	—N/a	—N/a	—N/a
10	"Eyeballs"	January 5, 2023	0.3	3.36	0.3	2.39	0.6	5.75
11	"Trinket"	January 12, 2023	0.3	3.43	0.3	2.35	0.6	5.78
12	"When the Dust Settles"	February 2, 2023	0.4	3.80	—N/a	—N/a	—N/a	—N/a
13	"Boned"	February 9, 2023	0.4	3.82	—N/a	—N/a	—N/a	—N/a
14	"Third Time's the Charm"	February 16, 2023	0.2	2.93	—N/a	—N/a	—N/a	—N/a
15	"Ashes, Ashes"	March 2, 2023	0.3	3.21	—N/a	—N/a	—N/a	—N/a
16	"We All Fall Down"	March 9, 2023	0.3	3.34	—N/a	—N/a	—N/a	—N/a
17	"The Promise"	March 30, 2023	0.3	3.26	—N/a	—N/a	—N/a	—N/a
18	"Fractured"	April 13, 2023	0.3	3.39	—N/a	—N/a	—N/a	—N/a
19	"Dead Memories"	May 4, 2023	0.3	3.18	—N/a	—N/a	—N/a	—N/a
20	"Shell Game"	May 11, 2023	0.3	3.29	—N/a	—N/a	—N/a	—N/a
21	"Dying Words"	May 18, 2023	0.2	2.76	—N/a	—N/a	—N/a	—N/a

==== Season 3 ====
Viewership and ratings per episode of CSI: Vegas
No.	Title	Air date	Rating/share (18–49)	Viewers (millions)	DVR (18–49)	DVR viewers (millions)	Total (18–49)	Total viewers (millions)
1	"The Reaper"	February 18, 2024	0.3	4.09	—N/a	—N/a	—N/a	6.70
2	"Scar Tissue"	February 25, 2024	0.3	4.16	—N/a	—N/a	—N/a	—N/a
3	"Rat Packed"	March 3, 2024	0.3	4.37	—N/a	—N/a	—N/a	—N/a
4	"Health and Wellness"	March 17, 2024	0.3	4.30	—N/a	—N/a	—N/a	—N/a
5	"It Was Automation"	March 24, 2024	0.3	4.56	—N/a	—N/a	—N/a	—N/a
6	"Atomic City"	April 21, 2024	0.3	4.09	—N/a	—N/a	—N/a	—N/a
7	"Coinkydink"	April 28, 2024	0.3	4.19	—N/a	—N/a	—N/a	—N/a
8	"The Artist is Present"	May 5, 2024	0.2	4.10	—N/a	—N/a	—N/a	—N/a
9	"Heavy Metal"	May 12, 2024	0.3	4.16	—N/a	—N/a	—N/a	—N/a
10	"Tunnel Vision"	May 19, 2024	0.4	4.25	—N/a	—N/a	—N/a	—N/a

== See also ==
- List of television shows set in Las Vegas
- CSI (franchise)
- List of CSI: Crime Scene Investigation episodes
- List of CSI: Miami episodes
- List of CSI: NY episodes
- List of CSI: Cyber episodes
