= Warren Keith =

American character actor

- Other name: Warren David Keith
- Education: Wesleyan University; Yale School of Drama
- Occupations: Actor; Director; Teacher
- Years active: 1986-Present
- Organization(s): Screen Actors Guild; American Federation of Television and Radio Artists; Actors' Equity Association

Warren Keith (Warren David Keith) is an American character actor of stage, film, and television, active since the late 1980s. Keith also directs, and teaches acting at ACT, University of California, Davis, The New School for Social Research, and Barnard College.

== Education ==
Kieth graduated from Wesleyan University and the Yale School of Drama.

== Career ==
Among other films, Keith has acted in four films by the Coen brothers; he played an FBI Agent in Raising Arizona and the fastidious funeral director in The Big Lebowski. In Fargo and A Serious Man he does not appear on screen but is heard several times in telephone conversation with the respective lead characters. He had a starring role in the film Haiku Tunnel. He also has appeared in television shows such as Nash Bridges, The Equalizer, and Trauma.

== Personal life ==
He is married to Melissa Smith and resides in San Francisco.

== Filmography ==
Warren Keith film and television credits
Year	Title	Role	Notes
1986	The Manhattan Project	Computer	
1987	Raising Arizona	Younger FBI Agent	
1987	The Equalizer	TV Reporter	Episode: "Encounter in a Closed Room"
1987	Hiding Out	Breech	
1992	Loving	Larry Howat	Episode #2202
1996	Fargo	Reilly Diefenbach (voice)	
1996	Nash Bridges	Nash's Lawyer	Episode: "Internal Affairs"
1998	The Big Lebowski	Francis Donnelly	
2000	Just One Night	Concierge	
2001	Haiku Tunnel	Bob Shelby	
2009	Stephanie's Image	Detective McCaffrey	
2009	Moonlight Sonata	Tom	
2009	A Serious Man	Dick Dutton (voice)	
2009	Trauma	Mr. Batten	Episode: "Blue Balloon"
2010	Welcome Space Brothers	James VanDekrup	
2015	Love & Texas	Bob Shelby	
2019	The Last Black Man in San Francisco	Tim	
2020	Nomadland	George	
