= Stephanie's Image =

- Stephanie's Image poster
- Directed by: Janis DeLucia Allen
- Written by: JP Allen
- Produced by: Coffee and Language Productions
- Starring: Melissa Leo
- Cinematography: KC Smith
- Edited by: Janis DeLucia Allen
- Music by: Michael Slattery and SHOULDERS
- Distributed by: Vanguard Cinema
- Release date: February 25, 2009 (NewFilmmakers Los Angeles)
- Running time: 72 minutes
- Country: United States
- Language: English

Stephanie's Image is a 2009 American drama film directed by Janis DeLucia Allen, written by J.P. Allen and featuring Melissa Leo in the title role.

== Plot ==
A former model, Stephanie, is found murdered in her San Francisco apartment. Her boyfriend, Richard, whose body is also found at the scene, apparently killed her and then committed suicide. A photographer who worked closely with Stephanie decides to make a documentary about her life, a kind of memorial. She interviews those people closest to Stephanie, but she soon discovers that almost everything she’s been told about the crime is false, and everyone she interviews is lying. The circumstances surrounding Stephanie’s death become more and more contradictory and as the filmmaker struggles to find the truth she also realizes she may have played a frightening part in what happened to her friend.

== Festivals and awards ==
Festivals - Official Selection

- NewFilmmakers, Los Angeles - February, 2009
- Method Fest Independent Film Festival - March, 2009
- Milan International Film Festival, Italy - May, 2009
- Lighthouse International Film Festival - June, 2009
- Washougal International Film Festival - August, 2009
- Charlotte Film Festival - September, 2009
- Ojai-Ventura International Film Festival - November, 2009

Nominations

- Milan International Film Festival 2009 - Best Feature Film
- Milan International Film Festival 2009 - Best Actress, Melissa Leo
- Milan International Film Festival 2009 - Best Editor, Janis Delucia Allen

Awards

- Washougal International Film Festival, 2009 - Audience Award, Best Feature film

== Release ==
Stephanie's Image premiered at the Method Fest Independent Film Festival in March 2009 and played at several US festivals. It also received multiple nominations at the 2009 Milan International Film Festival Awards including consideration for Best Feature Film. The film had a very limited theatrical release on February 15, 2010. It was released on DVD by Vanguard Cinema on February 23, 2010.
