= Tom Austen =

British actor

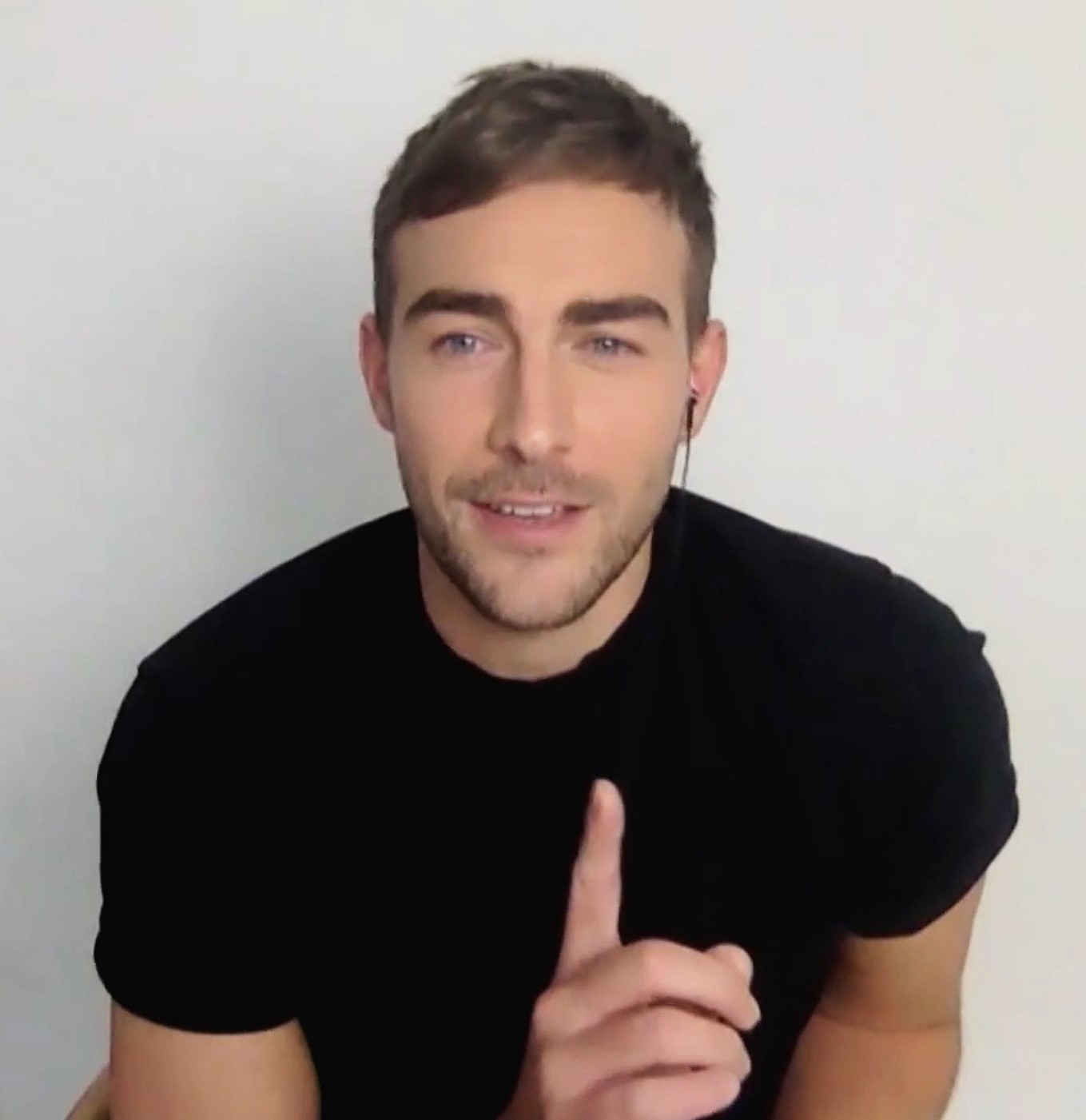
- Austen discusses his Helstrom television series in 2020
- Born: 15 September 1987 (age 39); Hampshire, England
- Occupation: Actor
- Years active: 2010–present
- Relatives: Freddy Carter (brother)

Thomas Michael Carter (born 15 September 1987), known professionally as Tom Austen, is an English actor, known for his television appearances portraying Jasper Frost on The Royals, Guy Hopkins on Grantchester and Daimon Helstrom in the Marvel Cinematic Universe series Helstrom.

== Early life ==
Born in the county of Hampshire and raised in Taunton, Somerset, Austen attended Queen's College, Taunton and then the Guildhall School of Music and Drama. His younger brother, Freddy Carter, is also an actor.

== Career ==
Austen's first acting job was portraying rent boy Anto in an episode of the UK series Shameless in 2010. He played multi-episode roles on The Borgias and Beaver Falls in 2012, and starred as Marc Bayard in the police procedural series Jo in 2013. After his costarring role as Grantchester's Guy Hopkins in 2014, Austen began portraying duplicitous bodyguard Jasper Frost on the E! drama series The Royals in 2015. In October 2019, Austen was cast as Daimon Helstrom in the Hulu series Helstrom.

== Filmography ==
=== Film ===
Year	Title	Role	Notes	Ref.
2013	Legendary: Tomb of the Dragon	Scott		
2014	Ironclad: Battle for Blood	Guy the Squire		
2017	Bitter Harvest	Taras		
2019	No. 89	John	Short film	

=== Television ===
Year	Title	Role	Notes	Ref.
2010	Shameless	Anto	Episode: "Gang Wars"	
2011	Doctors	Jonathan Bone	Episode: "Charming"	
2012	The Borgias	Raffaello Pallavicini	4 episodes	
2012	Misfits	Pete	Episode: "In the Skin of Another"	
2012	Beaver Falls	Mac	Main role	
2013	Jo	Marc Bayard	Main role	
2013	London Irish	Martin	Episode 4	
2013	Agatha Christie's Poirot	Ted Williams	Episode: "The Labours of Hercules"	
2014–2017	Grantchester	Guy Hopkins	11 episodes	
2015	Unforgotten	Josh Cross	6 episodes	
2015–2018	The Royals	Jasper Frost	Main role	
2020	The Bold Type	Cody	3 episodes	
2020	Helstrom	Daimon Helstrom	Main role	
2023	Django	Elijah	1 episode	

=== Video games ===
Year	Title	Role	Notes	Ref.
2016	Batman: Arkham VR	Robin / Tim Drake	Video game	
