= June Carryl =

American actress and playwright

- Occupations: Actress, writer
- Years active: 1997–present

June Carryl is an American actress and playwright who has made numerous television appearances such as Mindhunter.

== Career ==
Carryl, sometimes credited as June Lomena, has appeared in film and television, largely in character roles. She has appeared in films such as What Dreams May Come, Sweet November, and Back Roads. She made numerous one-off appearances on television such as Parenthood, Law & Order: LA, Criminal Minds, The Bold and the Beautiful, and Without a Trace She played major roles on the Netflix series Mindhunter and the Hulu series Helstrom as Louise Hastings.

Carryl's work on stage included performing with the B Street Theatre in Sacramento, California, and in the Oxford Shakespeare Festival in Oregon.

Plays written by Carryl include The Girl Who Made the Milky Way.

== Personal life ==
She is the older sister of political commentator and television host Joy Reid.

== Filmography ==
=== Film ===
Year	Title	Role	Notes
1997	A Smile Like Yours	Karaoke Act 3	
1998	What Dreams May Come	Woman in Car Accident	
1999	King of the Bingo Game	Laura	Short
2000	Woman on Top	Zeke	
2001	Haiku Tunnel	DaVonne	
2001	Sweet November	Beatrice	
2007	The Members	Gloria	TV movie
2008	Speedie Date	Helga	Short
2009	Hired Gun	Danisha / Sarah Gatewood	
2012	Qualia	Doris Davis	
2013	The Other Side of the Desk	Applicant	Short
2014	Only Light	Congolese Woman	Short
2014	Health & Disorder	Dr. Ray	Short
2015	Touch	Attorney London	Short
2016	2 Lava 2 Lantula!	Elizabeth	TV movie
2017	Avowed	Nurse Fanny	Short
2018	Dead Women Walking	Donna	
2018	Back Roads	Betty	
2018	Under the Silver Lake	Sheriff	
2019	Road to Zion	Vinitia	Short
2019	One Fine Christmas	Matty	TV movie
2021	King Alpha	Dr. Martin	

=== Television ===
Year	Title	Role	Notes
1997-99	Nash Bridges	Dr. Barry	Episode: "Blackout" & "Shoot the Moon"
2004	Without a Trace	Mrs. Brooks	Episode: "Trails"
2006	The Bold and the Beautiful	Minister Jill	Episode: "Episode #1.4834"
2009	Criminal Minds	Doctor	Episode: "Bloodline"
2011	Parenthood	Miss Hillary	Episode: "Amazing Andy and His Wonderful World of Bugs"
2011	Law & Order: Los Angeles	Female Uni	Episode: "Plummer Park"
2011	CSI: Miami	Nurse	Episode: "Countermeasures"
2013	Bunheads	Lucy	Episode: "Channing Tatum Is a Fine Actor"
2014	The Millers	Woman	Episode: "Plus One"
2014	State of Affairs	Receptionist	Episode: "Ar Rissalah"
2015	Grey's Anatomy	Nurse	Episode: "Guess Who's Coming to Dinner"
2015	Castle	Therapist	Episode: "The Last Seduction"
2016	Mad Dogs	Garifuna Mother	Episode: "Leslie"
2016	Stitchers	Helen Mulaney	Episode: "The One That Got Away"
2016	Time Traveling Bong	Future Woman	Episode: "Chapter 1: The Beginning" & "Chapter 3: The End...?"
2016	Bones	Attorney	Episode: "The Fight in the Fixer"
2016	Documentary Now!	Subway Attendant	Episode: "Parker Gail's Location Is Everything"
2016	NCIS: Los Angeles	Beth Kelley	Episode: "Ghost Gun"
2016	American Crime Story	Black Woman 2	Episode: "100% Not Guilty"
2017	Colony	Dr. Noto	Episode: "Ronin"
2017	American Crime	Maggie Phillips	Episode: "Season Three: Episode Seven"
2017	Scandal	Plainclothes NSA Agent	Episode: "Transfer of Power"
2017	S.W.A.T.	Luanne	Episode: "Pilot" & "Octane"
2017	Ctrl Alt Delete	Joan	Episode: "Roni" & "Margaret"
2018	The Mayor	Jasmine	Episode: "Death of a Councilman"
2018	NCIS	Julia Marino	Episode: "Keep Your Friends Close"
2018	American Crime Story	Jennifer	Episode: "House by a Lake"
2018	Snowfall	Wanda's Grandma	Episode: "The World Is Yours" & "Surrender"
2018	Heathers	Nurse	Episode: "Hot Probs"
2018	StartUp	Agent Bradley	Episode: "Authentication" & "Limited Liability"
2019	Lethal Weapon	Judge	Episode: "There Will Be Bud"
2019	Station 19	-	Episode: "Crash and Burn"
2019	Dead to Me	Angela	Episode: "I Have to Be Honest"
2019	Mindhunter	Camille Bell	Main cast: season 2
2020	Bosch	Dee Davis	Episode: "Three Windows"
2020	Helstrom	Louise Hastings	Main cast
2021	Shameless	Beatrice	Episode: "DNR"
2021	9-1-1: Lone Star	Dr. Mary Roberts	Episode: "One Day"
2021	The Conners	Joanne	Episode: "Peter Pan, The Backup Plan, Adventures in Babysitting, and A River Runs Through It"
2021	Y: The Last Man	-	Episode: "Peppers" & "Victoria"
2021	The Beautiful Liar	-	Episode: "Secrets" & "Archives"
