= List of Marvel Cinematic Universe teams and organizations =

The Marvel Cinematic Universe (MCU) is an American media franchise and shared universe centered on superhero films and other series starring various titular superheroes independently produced by Marvel Studios and based on characters that appear in American comic books published by Marvel Comics. The shared universe, much like the original Marvel Universe in comic books, was established by crossing over common plot elements, settings, cast, and characters. Over the course of the films and related media (such as Disney+ miniseries), several teams and organizations have been formed, each with different aims and purposes.

== Teams and factions ==
=== Avengers ===
Avengers logo

The Avengers are the central team of protagonist superheroes of "The Infinity Saga" within the Marvel Cinematic Universe. Created by Nick Fury and led primarily by Steve Rogers / Captain America, the team is a United States–based organization composed mainly of enhanced individuals committed to the world's protection from threats. The Avengers operate in New York State; beginning at Avengers Tower in Midtown Manhattan, and subsequently, from the Avengers Compound in Upstate New York.

=== Children of Thanos ===
The Children of Thanos were an elite team of powerful people who served Thanos as generals and agents. Thanos adopted six known children—Ebony Maw, Proxima Midnight, Corvus Glaive, Cull Obsidian, Gamora, and Nebula—and trained them in the ways of combat, turning each of them into a deadly warrior. Over the years, Gamora and Nebula would turn on Thanos, while the rest of his children continued to serve him faithfully.

In 2018, as Thanos began his crusade to acquire the six Infinity Stones, he sent his children to Earth to retrieve the Time and Mind Stones. Maw and Obsidian attempted to remove the former from Doctor Strange's Eye of Agamotto while Glaive and Midnight attempted to steal the latter from Vision. Five years later, alternate versions of the Children of Thanos from 2014 time-traveled to 2023 and participated in the battle between Thanos's forces and the Avengers, Guardians of the Galaxy, Masters of the Mystic Arts, and Ravagers. Obsidian and Glaive were killed during the battle, while Maw and Midnight disintegrated after Stark gathered the Infinity Stones and snapped his fingers. An alternate version shown in What If...? shows how Thanos lost the team to the Collector when he became good.

As of 2026, the group has appeared in three projects: the films Avengers: Infinity War (2018) and Avengers: Endgame (2019); and the Disney+ animated series What If...? (2021–2024), in which they are referred to as the Black Order.

=== Defenders ===
The Defenders are a team of street-based superheroes in New York City, consisting of Matt Murdock / Daredevil, Jessica Jones, Luke Cage, and Danny Rand / Iron Fist.

As of 2026, the group has appeared in one project: the Marvel Television series The Defenders (2017). They will return in the Disney+ series Daredevil: Born Again (2025–present).

=== Dora Milaje ===
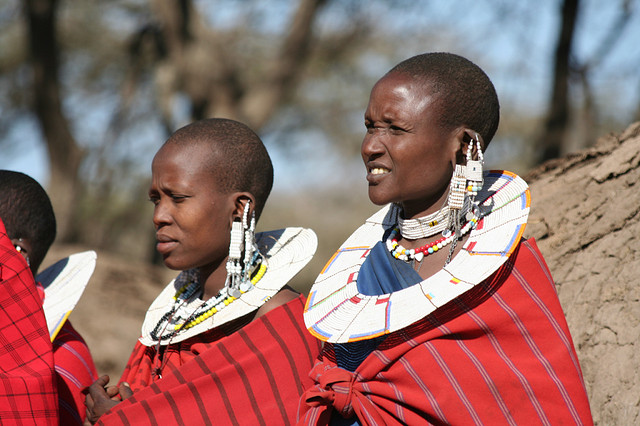
The Maasai people of Kenya inspired about 80% of the design of the Dora Milaje.

The Dora Milaje, also known simply as the Dora, are an elite organization of female bodyguards and Wakanda's special forces. The current general is Ayo. Florence Kasumba portrays Ayo, a member of the Dora Milaje, in Captain America: Civil War, as a guard of T'Challa. They next appear in Black Panther; Florence Kasumba reprises her role, Danai Gurira portrays Okoye, and Sydelle Noel portrays Xoliswa, while the unnamed Dora Milaje are portrayed by Marija Abney, Janeshia Adams-Ginyard, Maria Hippolyte, Marie Mouroum, Jénel Stevens, Zola Williams, Christine Hollingsworth, and Shaunette Renée Wilson. After Killmonger takes over Wakanda and seemingly kills T'Challa, the Dora Milaje reluctantly stand by him as they must remain loyal to the throne. After T'Challa returns, the Dora Milaje fight Killmonger, though Xoliswa is killed in the process. In 2018, the Dora Milaje join the Avengers in defending Wakanda from Thanos's forces, whilst they fight Thanos's forces again in 2023. In 2024, after Bucky Barnes breaks Helmut Zemo out of prison, the Dora Milaje pursue the latter, and eventually capture him before sending him to the Raft. Ayo advises Barnes not to return to Wakanda for some time, though he is able to ask them to create a suit for Sam Wilson.

As of 2026, the group has appeared in seven projects: the films Captain America: Civil War (2016), Black Panther (2018), Avengers: Infinity War, Avengers: Endgame, and Black Panther: Wakanda Forever (2022); and the Disney+ series The Falcon and the Winter Soldier (2021), What If...?, and Eyes of Wakanda (2025).

=== Fantastic Four ===
The Fantastic Four is a world-famous team of four superheroes on Earth-828, consisting of Reed Richards / Mister Fantastic, Sue Storm / Invisible Woman, Johnny Storm / Human Torch and Ben Grimm / The Thing. The team was originally a group of four astronauts who ventured into outer space and were exposed to cosmic rays, granting them superpowers.

As of 2026, the group has appeared in three projects: the one-shot comics Fantastic Four: First Steps (2025) and Fantastic Four: First Foes (2026); and the film The Fantastic Four: First Steps (2025). They will return in the films Avengers: Doomsday (2026) and Avengers: Secret Wars (2027).

=== Freedom Fighters ===
The Freedom Fighters is a rebel group against Kang the Conqueror's oppression of the communities in the Quantum Realm.

As of 2026, the group has appeared in one project: the film Ant-Man and the Wasp: Quantumania (2023).

=== Guardians of the Galaxy ===
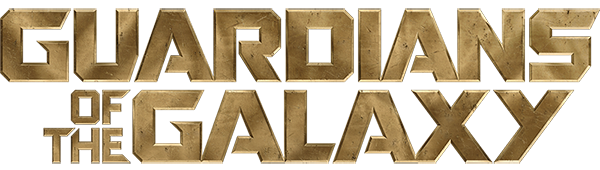
Logo of the Guardians of the Galaxy film series

The Guardians of the Galaxy are a band of outlaws who joined to protect the galaxy from threats. The group's founding members are Star-Lord, Gamora, Drax, Rocket, and Groot. The team's membership is later expanded with the addition of Yondu Udonta, Mantis and temporarily Nebula in their fight against Ego. Kraglin also assists the team in the final confrontation. Four years later, they aid Thor and the Avengers in confronting Thanos in his attempt to collect the six Infinity Stones. Thanos succeeds in collecting all of Stones, murdering Gamora in the process, and disintegrates half of all life in the universe, with Star-Lord, Drax, Mantis, and Groot among his victims, with only Rocket and Nebula spared. After Thanos has destroyed the Stones and is executed by Thor, Rocket and Nebula become members of the Avengers. In 2023, they use the Quantum Realm to travel to alternate universes to retrieve Infinity Stones. They are successful, but an alternate 2014 Thanos variant becomes aware of the presence of this other Nebula, and has her captured, sending his Nebula to the present in the former's place. The alternate Nebula brings the alternate Thanos and his army to the main universe, where he destroys the Avengers Compound in order to acquire the Stones to kill the entire universe. Nebula successfully convinces an alternate Gamora to join her in opposing Thanos, and kills her alternate counterpart. The combined forces of the Avengers, the Guardians and all of their allies succeed in repelling his forces, and eliminating the alternate Thanos and his army. Afterwards, Thor joins the Guardians, quipping that they are now the "Asgardians of the Galaxy", and jokingly argues with Quill over command of the team.

In 2024, the team help Thor get back into his fit and are joined by Kraglin, now sporting (though still adjusting) the late Yondu's "fin & yaka arrow". They go on several adventures throughout the galaxy. On the planet Indigarr, they are met by Korg. There, Thor decides to leave the Guardians in search for answers upon learning of gods being murdered across the universe. In 2025, as depicted in The Guardians of the Galaxy Holiday Special, the team has gained a large amount of money and resources by saving the universe and buy the former home of Knowhere from the Collector, to be used as their base of operations. Cosmo the Spacedog then joins the team and helps them rebuild Knowhere. Mantis and Drax hold a Christmas celebration for Quill with the help of the other Guardians and residents of Knowhere. In 2026, Quill frequently gets drunk due to grieving Gamora, while the team has successfully built their headquarters. One night, they are attacked by Adam Warlock, who seriously injures Rocket, and is defeated by Nebula. The team leave in their new ship, tasking Cosmo and Kraglin to keep watch over Knowhere. They head to Orgocorp and are stopped by the Ravagers, where the alternate version of Gamora is tasked to help them. They retrieve Rocket's file and depart for Counter-Earth. Quill and Groot leave to meet with the High Evolutionary, while Nebula is forced to stay outside. Quill and Groot make their escape with one of the High Evolutionary's men and retrieve the code to save Rocket. Nebula, joined by Mantis and Drax, enter the ship to save Quill and Groot, but get captured instead. Gamora protects Rocket and picks up Quill and Groot. Quill provides the code, but Rocket flatlines, however he is resuscitated by Quill. After learning that the others are captured, Quill asks Kraglin to bring Knowhere to the High Evolutionary's ship. The team defeats the High Evolutionary and Cosmo uses her powers to stop the ship from crashing into Knowhere and provide a safe escape for the captured animals and children. Quill almost dies but is rescued by Warlock. Afterwards, Quill says goodbye to Gamora and tells the team he is leaving for Earth. Mantis announces she is leaving for self discovery, and Nebula asks Drax to help her raise the children on Knowhere. Quill then gives Rocket the title of Captain and lets him keep his Zune.

Sometime later, Rocket, leading a new team consisting of a massively grown Groot, Cosmo, Kraglin, Warlock, Warlock's pet Blurp, and Phyla, one of the rescued children, go on a mission on Krylor.

As of 2026, the group has appeared in eight projects: the films Guardians of the Galaxy (2014), Guardians of the Galaxy Vol. 2 (2017), Avengers: Infinity War, Avengers: Endgame, Thor: Love and Thunder (2022), and Guardians of the Galaxy Vol. 3 (2023); the Disney+ animated series What If...?; and the Disney+ special The Guardians of the Galaxy Holiday Special (2022).

=== Guardians of the Multiverse ===
The Guardians of the Multiverse as depicted in the What If...? episode "What If... the Watcher Broke His Oath?"

The Guardians of the Multiverse, also known as the Exiles, is a group consisted of superheroes and supervillains from across the Multiverse. The group was assembled by the Watcher with the goal of stopping an alternate version of Ultron from destroying the Multiverse. The group's members are Peggy Carter / Captain Carter, T'Challa / Star-Lord, Thor, Erik "Killmonger" Stevens, Gamora, Natasha Romanoff / Black Widow, and Stephen Strange / Doctor Strange Supreme. After a lengthy battle, the team defeats Ultron, but Killmonger enters into a duel with Arnim Zola over the Infinity Stones. Strange Supreme then casts a spell which imprisons the two inside a pocket dimension before the team is disbanded, returning to their universes by the Watcher. However, Romanoff is transported to another universe, as her own universe was destroyed by Ultron. Sometime later, the surviving members of the team briefly reunited alongside Kahhori, Byrdie the Duck, and Ororo Munroe / Storm the Goddess of Thunder.

As of 2026, the group has appeared in one project: the Disney+ animated series What If...?.

=== Howling Commandos ===
The Howling Commandos as depicted in the film Captain America: The First Avenger.

The Howling Commandos are an elite combat unit that had been led by Captain America (portrayed by Chris Evans) during World War II. At the end of the war and after Captain America's apparent demise, their unit continued to be active and was led by Dum Dum Dugan (portrayed by Neal McDonough). They are first introduced in Captain America: The First Avenger. They were made up of men freed from a Hydra prisoner camp by Rogers. Their number also included Bucky Barnes, Gabe Jones, James Montgomery Falsworth, Jim Morita, and Jacques Dernier (portrayed by Sebastian Stan, Derek Luke, JJ Feild, Kenneth Choi, and Bruno Ricci respectively). Dugan and Morita appear in a flashback in the live-action television series Agents of S.H.I.E.L.D. episode "Shadows", with McDonough and Choi reprising their respective roles. They assist Peggy Carter (Hayley Atwell) in capturing Hydra agents following the events of The First Avenger. The Howling Commandos appear in the live-action television series Agent Carter episode "The Iron Ceiling", consisting of Dugan (reprised by McDonough) and new members Happy Sam Sawyer (Leonard Roberts), Junior Juniper (James Austin Kerr), and Pinky Pinkerton (Richard Short). While the team assists Carter on a mission to Russia, Juniper reveals he was the one who came up with the name "Howling Commandos" before he is later killed in action. In the 2014 film Captain America: The Winter Soldier, the team is specifically identified as the Howling Commandos as part of a Smithsonian exhibit. In Agents of S.H.I.E.L.D., the team uses old Howling Commandos' equipment provided by Agent Antoine Triplett who is the grandson of one of the Howling Commandos.

As of 2026, the group has appeared in four projects: the film Captain America: The First Avenger (2011); the Marvel Television series Agents of S.H.I.E.L.D. (2013–2020) and Agent Carter (2015–2016); and the Disney+ animated series What If...?.

=== Midnight Angels ===
The Midnight Angels are a pair of Wakandan warriors consisting of Okoye and Aneka, both equipped with advanced armor built by Shuri.

As of 2026, the group has appeared in one project: the film Black Panther: Wakanda Forever.

=== New Avengers ===
The New Avengers, originally nicknamed the Thunderbolts, are a group of individuals that teamed up after being targeted by Valentina Allegra de Fontaine and worked together to stop the Void. Following their triumph, de Fontaine manipulated the situation to declare the team as the "New Avengers", a new iteration of the Avengers, which was met with a mixed reception from the public. The team consists of Yelena Belova, Bucky Barnes, John Walker, Bob Reynolds, Alexei Shostakov, and Ava Starr.

As of 2026, the group has appeared in one project: the film Thunderbolts* (2025). They will return in the film Avengers: Doomsday.

=== Revengers ===
The Revengers is a team of ex-Sakaar prisoners assembled by Thor to escape the planet and defeat Hela. The team consists of Thor, Loki, Hulk, Valkyrie, Korg, and Miek. With the exception of Loki, who is choked to death by Thanos, the team survives Ragnarok and the attack on the Statesman.

As of 2026, the group has appeared in one project: the film Thor: Ragnarok (2017) and the Disney+ series Loki (2021–2023; archival footage).

=== Salem Coven ===
The Salem Coven was a witch coven based in Salem, Massachusetts. In 1693, during the Salem witch trials, the coven brought one of its members, Agatha Harkness, to the woods. She begged to be spared but was tied to a wooden post with magic bonds. Evanora Harkness, her mother, inquired if she was a witch, which Agatha admitted to. Evanora responded by saying she had betrayed her coven and stole knowledge above her place and that she practiced the darkest of magic, which Agatha denied. The witches tried to kill Agatha with energy beams as Agatha pleaded with Evanora. Agatha continued to cry until her powers took over and she reversed the effect of the beams onto the witches and killed them. Agatha broke free of the post and killed Evanora before taking the brooch off her mother's corpse and flew away.

As of 2026, the group has appeared in one project: the Disney+ series WandaVision (2021).

=== Starforce ===
The Starforce is an elite military task force of skilled Kree warriors in the service of the Kree Empire. Led by Yon-Rogg (portrayed by Jude Law in the 2019 film Captain Marvel), the group also includes Vers, Korath, Minn-Erva, Att-Lass, and Bron-Char (portrayed by Brie Larson, Djimon Hounsou, Gemma Chan, Algenis Perez Soto, and Rune Temte, respectively). The group is first seen going to the planet Torfa to rescue a Kree scout named Soh-Larr. Vers is captured in a Skrull ambush led by Talos, but escapes to Earth and makes contact with Yon-Rogg. Following a parley with Talos and the discovery of the Skrull refugees hidden by Mar-Vell, Starforce arrives on Earth and takes prisoner the Skrulls, Nick Fury, Maria Rambeau, and Goose. Vers, in her regained identity of Carol Danvers, is placed in a transmission with the Supreme Intelligence. After breaking free and overheating the implant that limited her abilities, Carol Danvers fights Starforce and Kree soldiers to rescue Nick Fury, Maria Rambeau, and the Skrulls; most of the antagonizing Kree are killed or incapacitated.

As of 2026, the group has appeared in one project: the film Captain Marvel (2019).

=== Strategic Operations Command Center ===
The Strategic Operations Command Center, also known by its acronym SOCC, was a special task force led by Thaddeus Ross in order to hunt down the Hulk. Part of the United States Army, the SOCC tracked Banner down in Rio de Janeiro, Brazil and attempted to arrest him, but Banner transforms into the Hulk and manages to escape. The SOCC then confront the Hulk at Grayburn College and arrest Banner, but are forced to become temporary allies with him during his fight with the Abomination in Harlem.

As of 2026, the group has appeared in one project: the film The Incredible Hulk (2008).

=== Valkyrie ===
The Valkyrie, also known as the Valkyrior, were a group of female Asgardian warriors who served under Odin. Described by Thor as a "legend", the Valkyrie were sworn to protect the throne and fly on winged horses. During one of their missions, they were sent by Odin to Hel in order to prevent his daughter, Hela, from escaping. However, Hela single-handedly murdered all but one of the Valkyrie before Odin arrived and stopped her. Deeply traumatized by the experience, the sole surviving Valkyrie leaves Asgard and becomes a bounty hunter, serving the Grandmaster on Sakaar as "Scrapper 142".

As of 2026, the group has appeared in one project: the film Thor: Ragnarok.

=== Warriors Three ===
The Warriors Three are a group of Asgardian warriors/adventurers, made up of Hogun, Fandral, and Volstagg, with Fandral initially portrayed by Joshua Dallas, Hogun portrayed by Tadanobu Asano, and Volstagg portrayed by Ray Stevenson. They often fight alongside Thor and Lady Sif. Zachary Levi later replaces Joshua Dallas as Fandral. Fandral, Hogun, and Volstagg are ultimately killed by Hela during her takeover of Asgard.

As of 2026, the group has appeared in four projects: the films Thor (2011), Thor: The Dark World (2013), and Thor: Ragnarok; and the Disney+ animated series What If...?.

== Companies ==
=== Advanced Idea Mechanics ===
Advanced Idea Mechanics, better known by its acronym A.I.M., was a scientific research and development company that was founded by Aldrich Killian. In 1999, Killian attempted to recruit Tony Stark, but failed and was instead approached by Maya Hansen, who agreed to join the organization and develop the Extremis genetic manipulation technology. Over the years, A.I.M. gathered an army of Extremis soldiers, but many of them became unstable and exploded. To cover the accidents up, Killian hired failed actor Trevor Slattery to pose as the Mandarin and claim responsibility for the "attacks". The Mandarin's actions eventually caught the attention of Tony Stark, whose mansion was later destroyed by A.I.M., while Killian kidnapped U.S. President Matthew Ellis. Killian is ultimately stopped by Stark and James Rhodes, and is then killed by Pepper Potts.

As of 2026, the group has appeared in one project: the film Iron Man 3 (2013).

=== Bestman Salvage ===
Bestman Salvage was a company based in New York owned and run by Adrian Toomes. Other employees included Phineas Mason, Herman Schultz, Jackson Brice, and Randy Vale. This company went defunct following the Department of Damage Control taking over their contracts, leading to Toomes choosing a life of crime to support his family.

As of 2026, the group has appeared in one project: the film Spider-Man: Homecoming (2017).

=== F.E.A.S.T. ===
Food, Emergency Aid, Shelter & Training, better known by its acronym F.E.A.S.T., is an American non-profit charitable organization. In 2024, May Parker worked for F.E.A.S.T. to feed the poor and the hungry in New York. During one of her shifts, the recently displaced Norman Osborn seeks shelter at the F.E.A.S.T. Community Center, and is tended to by May until her nephew Peter Parker arrives to escort him to the New York Sanctum, housing all the other displaced individuals from across the multiverse.

As of 2026, the group has appeared in one project: the film Spider-Man: No Way Home (2021).

=== Future Foundation ===
The Future Foundation is an international non-governmental organization founded by Sue Storm / Invisible Woman, which has achieved global demilitarization and peace through proactive diplomacy. The Chief of Staff of the organization is Lynne Nichols.

As of 2026, the group has appeared in one project: the film The Fantastic Four: First Steps.

=== Goodman, Lieber, Kurtzberg & Holliway ===
Goodman, Lieber, Kurtzberg & Holliway, better known by its initialism GLK&H, is an American law firm operating in New York City and Los Angeles. Holden Holliway is a character in the series, played by Steve Coulter. The names of the other unseen partners are a reference to Martin Goodman (born Moe Goodman), Stan Lee (born Stanley Lieber), and Jack Kirby (born Jacob Kurtzberg).

As of 2026, the group has appeared in one project: the Disney+ series She-Hulk: Attorney at Law (2022).

=== Hammer Industries ===
Hammer Industries is an American weapons manufacturing company formerly led by Justin Hammer, until his arrest at the Stark Expo. Following Tony Stark's unprecedented announcement that his company would no longer manufacture weapons, Hammer Industries received the weapons contract for the United States Armed Forces. However, despite its claims, most of the weapons produced by Hammer Industries are defective or weak.

As of 2026, the group has appeared in one project: the film Iron Man 2 (2010).

=== Landman & Zack ===
Landman & Zack is a prestigious law firm in New York City. Matt Murdock and Foggy Nelson were interns there until their morals led them to resign and form their own law firm, Nelson and Murdock.

As of 2026, the group has appeared in two projects: the Marvel Television series Daredevil (2015–2018); and the Disney+ series Daredevil: Born Again.

=== Markridge Biotech ===
Markridge Biotech is a biotechnology company.

As of 2026, the group has appeared in one project: the Disney+ series VisionQuest (2026).

=== Murdock & McDuffie ===
Murdock & McDuffie is a law firm founded by Matt Murdock and Kirsten McDuffie. Due to Foggy Nelson's death, the law firm of Nelson, Murdock & Page was dissolved. Murdock then approached McDuffie to form a private practice with him, and together they would handle difficult cases and focus on the impossible. This law firm became a success, and hired many attorneys to work for them.

As of 2026, the group has appeared in one project: the Disney+ series Daredevil: Born Again.

=== Nelson, Murdock & Page ===
Nelson, Murdock & Page is a law firm in Hell's Kitchen, New York founded by Foggy Nelson, Matt Murdock and Karen Page. The firm was dissolved after Nelson's death.

As of 2026, the group has appeared in one project: the Disney+ series Daredevil: Born Again.

=== New York Bulletin ===
The New York Bulletin is a tabloid newspaper in New York City. Mitchell Ellison is the newspaper's editor-in-chief. Ben Urich, Karen Page, and BB Urich have been employees of the Bulletin.

As of 2026, the group has appeared in 10 projects: the Marvel Television series Agents of S.H.I.E.L.D., Agent Carter, Daredevil, Jessica Jones (2015–2019), Luke Cage (2016–2018), Iron Fist (2017–2018), The Defenders, The Punisher (2017–2019), and Cloak & Dagger (2018–2019); and the Disney+ series Daredevil: Born Again.

=== Orgocorp ===
Orgocorp is an intergalactic bioengineering company founded by the High Evolutionary as a front for his experiments.

As of 2026, the group has appeared in one project: the film Guardians of the Galaxy Vol. 3.

=== Oscorp ===
Oscorp is a multibillion-dollar multinational corporation that was founded by noted industrialist Norman Osborn. The company typically deals with experimental science, military research and cross-species genetics. Norman offers Peter Parker an exclusive internship at the company, which Peter gladly accepts.

As of 2026, the group has appeared in one project: the Disney+ animated series Your Friendly Neighborhood Spider-Man (2024–present).

=== O.X.E. Group ===
The O.X.E. Group is a company managed by Countess Valentina Allegra de Fontaine, serving as a front for her own covert operations. The group appears in (The New Avengers) Thunderbolts* (2026).

=== Pym Technologies ===
Pym Technologies was a multinational technology and scientific research company founded by Hank Pym and later taken over by his protégé, Darren Cross. Following his departure from S.H.I.E.L.D., Pym founded the company to study quantum mechanics, but was later voted out of his own company by Cross and his daughter, Hope van Dyne. Obsessed with recreating the fabled Pym Particles, Cross eventually succeeded and created the Yellowjacket suit, hoping to sell it to the military or terrorist organizations and planning to rename the company Cross Technologies. He is ultimately stopped by Pym, Van Dyne, and Scott Lang, and the company's headquarters is destroyed. Sometime after the Sokovia Accords were repealed, Van Dyne bought back her father's company and renamed it the Pym van Dyne Foundation, to utilize the Pym Particles in new and innovative ways to help advance humanitarian efforts. The group appears in Ant-Man (2015) and Ant-Man and the Wasp: Quantumania (2023).

=== Roxxon Corporation ===
Roxxon Corporation is a large industrial conglomerate that frequently comes into conflict with S.H.I.E.L.D. and other superheroes due to its willingness to use unethical methods.

In the 1940s, Roxxon employee Miles Van Ert (portrayed by James Urbaniak) collaborates with Leviathan agents to create more of Howard Stark's destructive Nitramene chemical in a Roxxon refinery. Strategic Scientific Reserve (SSR) operative Peggy Carter infiltrates the facility, but Leviathan operative Leet Brannis uses a Nitramene bomb to implode the refinery. Roxxon's president Hugh Jones meets with SSR Deputy Director Roger Dooley and Agent Jack Thompson regarding the implosion, concluding that the culprit would be emitting Vita-Rays and later has Van Ert arrested. In the episode "A View in the Dark", Jones and the Council of Nine convince Calvin Chadwick to focus on a senatorial campaign instead of Isodyne Energy. Peggy later infiltrates Roxxon's Los Angeles branch in search of atomic bombs they are holding. Once she discovers the location, she, her partner Edwin Jarvis, and SSR agents infiltrate the facility and disable the bombs before Whitney Frost's group can get the devices.

In 2011, S.H.I.E.L.D. agent Phil Coulson stops at a Roxxon-branded gas station on his way to Albuquerque, New Mexico. In 2013, Norco, a Roxxon tanker caused an oil spill, leading to Roxxon accountant Thomas Richards (portrayed by Tom Virtue) being held captive by Trevor Slattery and seemingly executed on a live broadcast before later parting ways. The aforementioned tanker is later impounded in a shipping yard where Aldrich Killian planned to execute President Matthew Ellis. Simon Krieger was originally slated to appear in early drafts, but was replaced by Killian.

Roxxon's Cybertek division features in the television series Agents of S.H.I.E.L.D. In the episode "T.R.A.C.K.S.", they supply Ian Quinn with Project Deathlok technology to convert Mike Peterson into a cyborg. In the episode "Ragtag", Coulson leads a S.H.I.E.L.D. team in infiltrating Cybertek to steal files on Project Deathlok, discovering S.H.I.E.L.D.-turned-Hydra agent John Garrett was its first test subject in the process. In the episode "Beginning of the End", the Cybertek manufacturing facility's director Kyle Zeller prepares a team of Deathloks to combat Coulson's team. Following their defeat however, Garrett and Hydra push ahead with their plans while Coulson's team storm Cybertek and take Zeller hostage, believing he was working for Hydra. When Agent Skye discovers Hydra is holding Zeller's wife hostage, she frees her while the rest of the S.H.I.E.L.D. team defeat Garrett's forces. As of the episode "Principia", Cybertek was shut down following Garrett's defeat while ex-S.H.I.E.L.D. Academy student Tony Caine helped fake the Cybertek scientists' deaths to help them find new work, with one of them later providing information to Agent Alphonso "Mack" Mackenzie.

Roxxon features in the television series Daredevil. In the episode "Nelson v. Murdock", a flashback depicts Matt Murdock and Foggy Nelson interning at the law firm Landman & Zack, who sued a man who developed cancer while working at a Roxxon plant and claiming the man revealed proprietary secrets. In the episode "Kinbaku", Elektra Natchios breaks into Roxxon's systems to gain information, discovering the company is associated with the Hand.

Roxxon appears in season one of the television series Cloak & Dagger. In the episode "Suicide Sprints", the Roxxon Gulf Platform's supervisor Nathan Bowen receives an emergency call and attempts to have the facility shut down. However, the platform collapses, releasing energy that would go on to turn Tandy Bowen and Tyrone Johnson as well as Andre Deschaine into superhumans. In the episode "Princeton Offense", Roxxon's greedy Chief Executive of Risk Management Peter Scarborough (portrayed by Wayne Péré) defames Nathan for the accident while Tandy meets with environmentalist employee Mina Hess (portrayed by Ally Maki). In the episode "Funhouse Mirrors", Mina reveals her father Ivan Hess (portrayed by Tim Kang) was a partner of Nathan who had become catatonic and was hospitalized following the platform's collapse. In the episode "Lotus Eaters", Tandy and Tyrone eventually cure Ivan of the trauma and reunite him with Mina. In the episode "Colony Collapse", Tandy and Mina confront Scarborough, who reveals he was well aware of the energy underneath the platform and hired an assassin called Ashlie (portrayed by Vanessa Motta) to eliminate anyone who got too close. Eventually, Tandy's powers put Scarborough in a catatonic state similar to Ivan's and Scarborough is later found by Ashlie.

As of 2026, the group has appeared in twelve projects: the films Iron Man (2008), Iron Man 2, and Iron Man 3; the Marvel One-Shots A Funny Thing Happened on the Way to Thor's Hammer (2011); the Marvel Television series Agents of S.H.I.E.L.D., Agent Carter, Daredevil, Runaways (2017–2019), and Helstrom (2020); and the Disney+ series Loki, Echo, and Wonder Man (2026–present).

=== Stark Industries ===
Stark Industries is a company founded by Howard Stark and later handed over to Tony Stark. During World War II, a young Howard Stark assists the Strategic Scientific Reserve in their Super Soldier program, and provides key assistance to Steve Rogers and Agent Peggy Carter. The Stark Industries logo is modified to fit in with the 1940s time period. When Tony becomes CEO, the company is featured with a logo similar to those of Northrop Grumman and Lockheed Martin, and touted as developing many of the same weapons systems that Lockheed Martin is/was responsible for developing, such as the F-22 Raptor and F-16 Fighting Falcon. After Tony's father Howard dies, Obadiah Stane becomes the CEO and later abdicates when Tony grows old enough to run it. After Stark comes back from Afghanistan, he announces that he is closing the weapons division of the company, causing the company's stocks to fall by about 40.7%.

In 2010, Pepper Potts, Stark's lover and eventual wife, becomes the CEO of the company. Stark Industries, for the first time since 1974, hosted the renowned Stark Expo in Flushing Meadows. In 2012, Tony Stark opens the Stark Tower in New York City. After the Chitauri invasion, almost all the lettering forming the word 'STARK' on the side of the tower falls off, leaving only the 'A' – mirroring the logo of the Avengers that would replace the lettering later on. In 2013, Pepper is still the CEO of Stark Industries and Happy Hogan is the head of security. Happy calls out to an off-camera secretary named Bambi in reference to Bambi Arbogast. The company is later stated to have designed Sam Wilson's winged flight gear, as well as the redesigned Helicarriers' propulsion systems. After S.H.I.E.L.D. is dissolved, Maria Hill is seen applying for a position at the Human Resources department of Stark Industries.

The company also has a negative impact, with Wanda and Pietro Maximoff recalling their childhood in the fictional nation of Sokovia, where the apartment in which the Maximoff family was living was attacked with Stark Industries-manufactured mortar shells, killing their parents. This would prove to be the basis for their hatred of Stark.

A former Stark Industries warehouse later becomes the new Avengers headquarters. It is revealed in 2016 that Damage Control is a joint venture between Stark Industries and the U.S. government to clean up New York City in the aftermath of the invasion.

In 2024, a group of disgruntled former Stark Industries employees led by Quentin Beck create a fabricated superhero named Mysterio using the Stark Industries augmented reality technology "B.A.R.F." to wreak havoc while using drones to pose as the Elementals. They are stopped by Peter Parker, but William Ginter Riva managed to leak Spider-Man's identity to TheDailyBugle.net.

As of 2026, the group has appeared in 19 projects: the films Iron Man, The Incredible Hulk, Iron Man 2, Captain America: The First Avenger, The Avengers, Iron Man 3, Captain America: The Winter Soldier, Avengers: Age of Ultron, Ant-Man, Captain America: Civil War, Spider-Man: Homecoming, Avengers: Infinity War, Avengers: Endgame, Spider-Man: Far From Home, and Spider-Man: No Way Home; the Marvel One-Shot The Consultant; the Marvel Television series Agents of S.H.I.E.L.D. and Agent Carter; and the Disney+ animated series What If...?.

=== The Daily Bugle ===
The Daily Bugle (formerly TheDailyBugle.net) is a sensationalist news outlet modeled on Alex Jones' InfoWars headquartered in New York City and hosted by J. Jonah Jameson. In 2024, the site released doctored footage incriminating Spider-Man for the death of Mysterio and exposed his secret identity as Peter Parker and also to his colleagues Ned Leeds and MJ. Betty Brant later joins the company under an internship as Jameson's correspondent. Following Doctor Strange's second successful attempt to erase the world's knowledge of Peter's civilian identity and Mysterio's victory, Jameson resumes his coverage of the vigilante Spider-Man's activity, while promising his viewers that he will one day discover the truth behind his secret identity.

As of 2026, the group has appeared in three projects: the films Spider-Man: Far From Home and Spider-Man: No Way Home; and a web series of the same name. The Daily Bugle also appeared in the mid-credits scene of the Sony's Spider-Man Universe (SSU) film Venom: Let There Be Carnage.

=== WHIH World News ===
WHIH World News is a television network and subsidiary of VistaCorp that reports political, scientific, and entertainment news. Its program WHIH Newsfront is anchored by Christine Everhart and Will Adams. Over the years, it has covered stories on the bombings of Sokovia, Tony Stark's "I am Iron Man" press conference, the opening ceremony of the 2011 Stark Expo, a clash between the Hulk and the military at Culver University, the aftermath of the Hydra Uprising, Wilson Fisk's thoughts on Daredevil, the Battle of Sokovia, Scott Lang's break-in of VistaCorp, the creation of the Advanced Threat Containment Unit (ATCU), the reemergence of Danny Rand, an interview with Dr. Stephen Strange, the appointment of Thaddeus Ross as Secretary of State, the aftermath of the Lagos Incident, the signing of the Sokovia Accords, the return of the Punisher, reported sightings of the Inhumans, the activities of the Runaways, an alien attack in New York City, worldwide celebrations following the Blip, the appointment of John Walker as the new Captain America, and the Flag Smashers' attack on the Global Repatriation Council in New York. With Peter Parker being cleared of criminal charges, WHiH covers the anti- and pro-Spider-Man protests during the arrival of Parker and his friends Leeds and MJ at Midtown High for the first day of senior year. Valentina Allegra de Fontaine announces the New Avengers.

It appeared in the films The Incredible Hulk, Iron Man 2, Black Widow, and Eternals; the ABC series Agents of S.H.I.E.L.D. and Inhumans, the Netflix series Daredevil, Jessica Jones, Luke Cage, Iron Fist, and The Punisher, the Hulu series Runaways, and the Disney+ series WandaVision and The Falcon and the Winter Soldier; and is the main focus of the web series WHIH Newsfront, which served as a viral marketing campaign for Ant-Man, Captain America: Civil War, Spider-Man: No Way Home and Thunderbolts*.

=== Worldwide Engineering Brigade ===
The Worldwide Engineering Brigade, better known by its acronym W.E.B., is a company founded by Harry Osborn in an alternate universe. W.E.B. members include Peter Parker, Jeanne Foucault, and Asha.

As of 2026, the group has appeared in one project: the Disney+ animated series Your Friendly Neighborhood Spider-Man.

=== X-Con Security Consultants ===
X-Con Security Consultants is a security company founded by Scott Lang, Luis, Dave, and Kurt. While Scott is under house arrest for violating the Sokovia Accords, it is run by Luis.

As of 2026, the group has appeared in one project: the film Ant-Man and the Wasp.

== Criminal organizations ==
=== 110th Street gang ===
The 110th Street gang is a criminal gang based in New York City, formerly led by Big Donovan until his position was taken over by his second-in-command Lonnie Lincoln / Tombstone.

As of 2026, the group has appeared in one project: the Disney+ animated series Your Friendly Neighborhood Spider-Man.

=== Black Knife Cartel ===
The Black Knife Cartel is a crime syndicate affiliated with Wilson Fisk / Kingpin.

As of 2026, the group has appeared in one project: the Disney+ series Echo (2024).

=== Black Widows ===
The Black Widows are a group of assassins who are graduates of the Red Room, a program led by General Dreykov. The Red Room grew from a pre-World War II program that produced Soviet sleeper agent Dottie Underwood. By the 1980s, the Dreykov-led Red Room kidnaps young orphan girls to train as elite assassins by various individuals, including Madame B. and Melina Vostokoff. Graduates of the program include Natasha Romanoff, Yelena Belova, and Ruth Bat-Seraph. Following Romanoff's escape and defection to S.H.I.E.L.D., Dreykov implemented a mind-control technique to control the Widows and prevent their defection. The program was terminated in 2016 following the destruction of the Red Room's headquarters by Romanoff and Belova, and each surviving Widow went their separate ways. Belova went on to free other international Widows from Dreykov's mind control, while Bat-Seraph became security-advisor to President Thaddeus Ross.

In an alternate universe where Captain Peggy Carter became the first Avenger, Steve Rogers was captured by the Red Room in 1953 and brainwashed to be one of their agents. In 2014, Melina Vostokoff (the Red Room's leader after Drekov's death at the hands of Natasha Romanoff) and several Widows use a brainwashed Rogers to lay a trap for both Carter and Romanoff. The Widows battle Romanoff who defeats them and Melina.

As of 2026, the group has appeared in five projects: the films Black Widow and Captain America: Brave New World; and the Disney+ series What If...?, Hawkeye, and Marvel Zombies. The program's precursor appeared in the Marvel Television series Agent Carter.

=== Council of Kangs ===
The Council of Kangs is an assembly consisting of numerous variants of Kang the Conqueror across the multiverse, such as Immortus, Rama-Tut, and Centurion.

As of 2026, the group has appeared in one project: of the film Ant-Man and the Wasp: Quantumania (mid-credits scene cameo).

=== Flag Smashers ===
The Flag Smashers are a team of enhanced individuals who oppose all forms of nationalism, believing that life was better during the Blip. The group posts messages in online forums and leaves clues around the world with augmented reality. Led by Karli Morgenthau, its members received increased strength by taking the Super Soldier Serum given to them by the Power Broker. They eventually turn on the Power Broker, who is later revealed to be Sharon Carter.

As of 2026, the group has appeared in one project: the Disney+ series The Falcon and the Winter Soldier.

=== Gnucci Crime Family ===
The Gnucci Crime Family is an Italian-American criminal organization based in New York City.

As of 2026, the group has appeared in two projects: the Marvel Television series The Punisher; and the Disney+ special The Punisher: One Last Kill (2026).

=== The Hand ===
The Hand (闇の手, Yami no te; lit. 'Hand of Darkness') is an ancient and powerful organization with the ultimate goal of gaining immortality. The Hand originated in K'un-Lun, when the five founders were banished from the city and have since lived on in the shadows for centuries, promoting their goal through wars, crime and influence on powerful people.

As of 2026, the group has appeared in four projects: the Marvel Television series Daredevil, Iron Fist, The Defenders; and the film Spider-Man: Brand New Day (2026). In Spider-Man: Brand New Day, the group is led by Snow, portrayed by Xiaoshuang Fan.

=== Hydra ===
Hydra is the former science research division of Adolf Hitler's Nazi Party and a covert terrorist organization responsible for infiltrating S.H.I.E.L.D. in the modern day.

Hydra was originally founded as an Inhuman cult dedicated to worshipping Hive and continued to exist throughout the centuries before it became part of Nazi Germany under Hitler. The modern incarnation was created by Hitler to pursue methods of creating advanced weaponry to help the Axis powers win World War II. Initially led by Johann Schmidt, Hydra acquired the Tesseract and conducted research on it to harness the energy it released to power weapons. Hydra's allegiance to its Nazi superiors grew to be only superficial; as Schmidt intended to harness the potential of the Tesseract to overthrow Hitler and eventually the world, believing that mankind could not be trusted with its own freedom. However, during the war, Hydra learned, particularly due to Steve Rogers' attacks on their operations, that humanity will always fight for its freedom. After Schmidt's disappearance and Rogers' successful efforts to botch Schmidt's plans to attack cities around the world, Hydra was defeated and fell. Following World War II, S.H.I.E.L.D. was founded by former members of the Strategic Scientific Reserve, and employed Operation Paperclip, recruiting former Hydra scientists with strategic value. As part of the process, Arnim Zola was recruited and then subsequently began to reform Hydra secretly from within S.H.I.E.L.D. Operating discreetly within S.H.I.E.L.D., Hydra staged political coups, wars (including the Cold War), and assassinations (including those of Howard and Maria Stark), intending to destabilize world governments and drive humanity to surrender its freedom in exchange for security. Hydra agent Gideon Malick infiltrated the World Security Council. Hydra's operations were later exposed by Rogers once S.H.I.E.L.D. fell, and their remnants were pursued and defeated by the Avengers and by remaining S.H.I.E.L.D. agents.

As of 2026, the group has appeared in 11 projects: the films Captain America: The First Avenger, Captain America: The Winter Soldier, Avengers: Age of Ultron, Ant-Man, Captain America: Civil War, and Avengers: Endgame; the Marvel Television series Agents of S.H.I.E.L.D. and Agent Carter; and the Disney+ series WandaVision, The Falcon and The Winter Soldier, and What If...?.

=== Intelligencia ===
Intelligencia is an online criminal organization founded by Todd Phelps and other influential people that harass people belonging to discriminated groups.

As of 2026, the group has appeared in one project: the Disney+ series She-Hulk: Attorney at Law.

=== Marauders ===
The Marauders were a group of space pirates who took advantage of the destruction of the Rainbow Bridge in Asgard and wreaked havoc across the Nine Realms, until they were stopped by Thor, Sif, the Warriors Three, and the Einherjar.

As of 2026, the group has appeared in one project: the film Thor: The Dark World.

=== Ravagers ===
The Ravagers are an interstellar crime syndicate comprising thieves, smugglers, criminals, bandits, mercenaries, bounty hunters, and space pirates. There are nearly one hundred factions of Ravagers around the galaxy each led by an independent captain. Their moral code states that Ravagers do not steal from other Ravagers or deal in children.

As of 2026, the group has appeared in five projects: the films Guardians of the Galaxy, Guardians of the Galaxy Vol. 2, Avengers: Endgame, and Guardians of the Galaxy Vol. 3; and the Disney+ animated series What If...?.

=== Scorpions ===
The Scorpions is a gang operating in New York City led by Mac Gargan / Scorpion.

As of 2026, the group has appeared in one project: the Disney+ animated series Your Friendly Neighborhood Spider-Man. The Scorpion Gang made their Marvel Comics debut in Spider-Man Noir vol. 3 #1 (October 2025).

=== Serpent Society ===
Serpent Society, also known as simply the Serpent, is a criminal organization led by Sidewinder. They came into conflict with Captain America when he intercepted an illegal sale of adamantium, which had been stolen from Japan, in Oaxaca.

As of 2026, the group has appeared in one project: the film Captain America: Brave New World.

=== Stakar Ogord's team ===
Stakar Ogord (portrayed by Sylvester Stallone) led his own team of Ravagers. Other members included Yondu Udonta, Aleta Ogord, Charlie-27, Martinex, Mainframe, and Krugarr (portrayed by Michael Rooker, Michelle Yeoh, Ving Rhames, Michael Rosenbaum, Miley Cyrus (later Tara Strong) respectively, with Krugarr being portrayed through CGI). The team eventually disbanded, but was reunited following the death of their former teammate Yondu.

As of 2026, the group has appeared in two projects: the films Guardians of the Galaxy Vol. 2 and Guardians of the Galaxy Vol. 3.

=== Super-Apes ===
The Super-Apes are a team of superpowered apes founded by Red Ghost on Earth-828. One of its members is the orangutan Peotor.

As of 2026, the group has appeared in one project: the film The Fantastic Four: First Steps.

=== Ten Rings ===
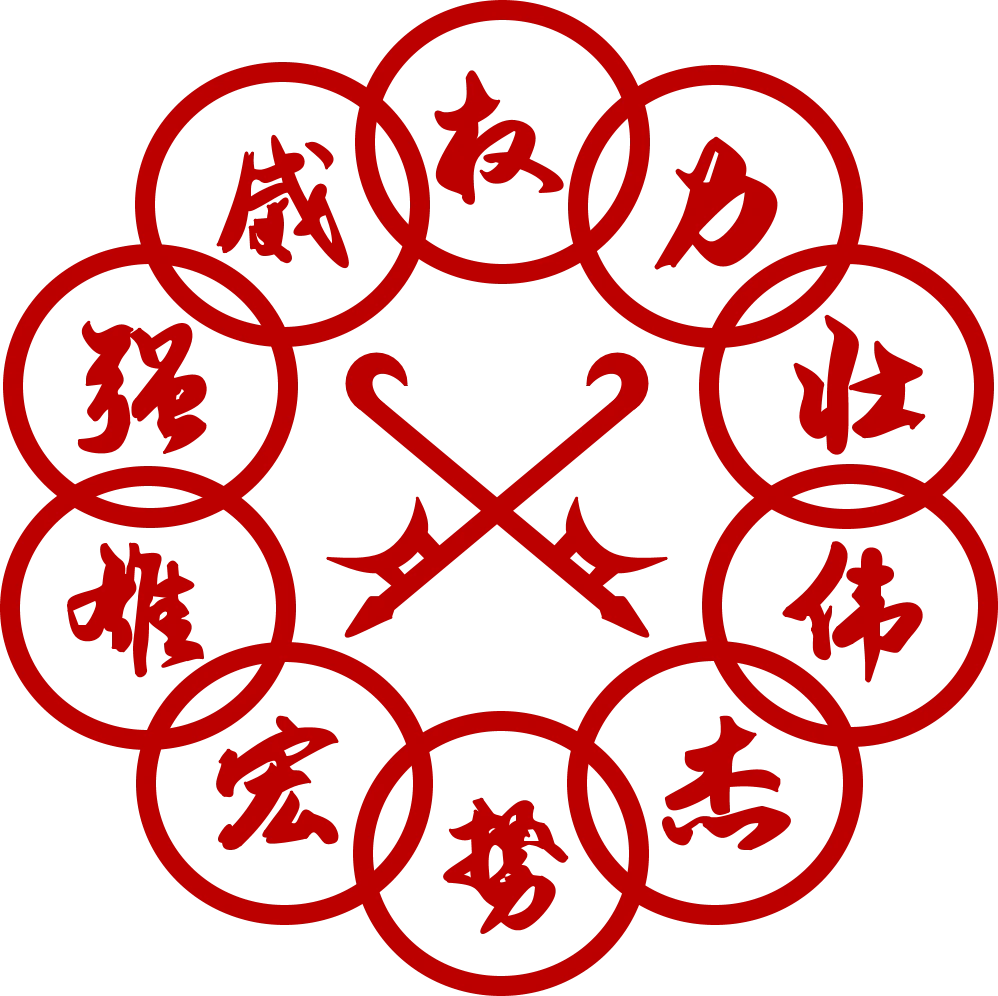
Ten Rings logo

The Ten Rings is a clandestine criminal organization founded one thousand years ago by the immortal warlord Xu Wenwu and named after his mystical ten rings. The group's name is an homage to the Mandarin's ten cosmic rings in Marvel Comics. In 1996, Wenwu disbanded the organization after marrying and starting a family, but reactivated the Ten Rings following the death of his wife, Ying Li.

In 2010, the Ten Rings is hired by Obadiah Stane to kidnap Tony Stark in Afghanistan, with the cell led by a man named Raza. The Ten Rings also help arrange for Ivan Vanko to travel to Monaco to enact his revenge on Stark. Years later, Aldrich Killian of AIM hires actor Trevor Slattery to pose as Wenwu; unfamiliar with Wenwu's history, Killian invents "the Mandarin" persona for Slattery and has him unwittingly broadcast propaganda messages claiming credit on behalf of the Ten Rings for explosions caused by AIM's failed Extremis experiments. However, following his arrest, Slattery is confronted by Jackson Norriss in prison, who reveals that he is a member of the group and that "the Mandarin" is real. In 2015, a member of the organization was one of Darren Cross' potential buyers of his Yellowjacket suit.

In 2024, Wenwu begins hearing his deceased wife's voice, telling him she is trapped in her former home, Ta Lo. Wenwu dispatches his Ten Rings warriors to capture his estranged children Shang-Chi and Xialing for their pendants that can lead him to Ta Lo. Wenwu and the Ten Rings arrive in Ta Lo and attack the village to free Li. Unbeknownst to Wenwu, Li's voice was that of the sealed Dweller-in-Darkness, who manipulates him into releasing it and its minions. The Ten Rings form a truce with the villagers to fight the new threat. After Wenwu's death, Xialing becomes the new leader of the Ten Rings and starts restructuring it by incorporating more female recruits into the previously all-male organization.

The organization Ten Rings was an original creation of the Marvel Cinematic Universe. The organization resembles Si-Fan from Sax Rhomer's books. In the animated series Iron Man: Armored Adventures, Gene Khan, the Mandarin leads the Tong; tong is a name of a type of criminal organization of Chinese immigrants in the United States.

As of 2026, the group has appeared in eight projects: the films Iron Man, Iron Man 2, Iron Man 3, Ant-Man, and Shang-Chi and the Legend of the Ten Rings; the Marvel One-Shot All Hail the King; and the Disney+ animated series What If...? and Marvel Zombies. The Ten Rings was later integrated into mainstream Marvel Universe.

=== Tivan Group ===
The Tivan Group is a powerful group led by the Collector. Responsible for the founding of the Exitar mining colony on Knowhere, the group wields enormous power and prestige in the criminal underworld of the cosmos.

As of 2026, the group has appeared in three projects: the films Thor: The Dark World and Guardians of the Galaxy; and the Disney+ animated series What If...?.

=== Tracksuit Mafia ===
The Tracksuit Mafia is a criminal organization operating in New York City working for Wilson Fisk / Kingpin. In the comics, they were known as the Tracksuit Draculas.

As of 2026, the group has appeared in one project: the Disney+ series Hawkeye (2021).

=== Wrecking Crew ===
The Wrecking Crew is a four-man criminal group wielding stolen enhanced Asgardian construction tools as weapons. The group's members consist of Wrecker, Piledriver, Bulldozer, and Thunderball. They were hired by Todd Phelps / HulkKing to steal a sample of Jennifer Walters' gamma-irradiated blood, though she fights them off.

As of 2026, the group has appeared in one project: the Disney+ series She-Hulk: Attorney at Law.

=== Zealots ===
The Zealots were a separatist faction of the Masters of the Mystic Arts led by Kaecilius. Kaecilius and his surviving disciples were given the immortality they had wanted all along from Dormammu. Unfortunately for them, the warnings they failed to heed turned out to be correct as the three were dragged into the Dark Dimension upon Doctor Strange defeating Dormammu.

As of 2026, the group has appeared in one project: the film Doctor Strange.

== Government agencies ==
=== Alias Investigations ===
Alias Investigations is a detective agency in New York City founded and run by the superpowered investigator Jessica Jones.

As of 2026, the group has appeared in three projects: the Marvel Television series Jessica Jones and The Defenders; and the Disney+ series Daredevil: Born Again.

=== Anti-Vigilante Task Force ===
The Anti-Vigilante Task Force (AVTF) is a task force of the New York City Police Department (NYPD), founded by Mayor Wilson Fisk to end vigilantism in New York City. The task force is composed of corrupt NYPD officers and, since its inception, has become Fisk's private militia, imposing his dominance over the city as part of Fisk's Safer Streets Initiative. The AVTF is disbanded after Fisk's removal from the position of mayor.

As of 2026, the group has appeared in one project: the Disney+ series Daredevil: Born Again.

=== Damage Control ===
The United States Department of Damage Control (DODC), often referred to as simply Damage Control, is a United States government agency, formerly a subunit of S.H.I.E.L.D..

In 2012, it is set up with the aid of Stark Industries in order to clean up after the Battle of New York. This drives Adrian Toomes' company out of business and leading the latter into his criminal life as the Vulture. In 2016, DODC agents arrive to clean up a destroyed bank and deli-grocery store.

In 2024, DODC agents, led by P. Cleary, arrive at Peter Parker's apartment. They bring him, his aunt May, and friends, Ned Leeds and Michelle Jones, to the NYPD precinct for interrogation after his identity as Spider-Man was made public and he was framed for the murder of Mysterio. Later, Cleary meets with Happy Hogan and Matt Murdock to discuss the missing Stark technology. DODC agents are then called in by The Daily Bugle to Hogan's condominium and witness the fight going on between Parker and multiversal displaced people, before opening fire on Parker when he is in view.

In 2025, after forgetting Parker's existence under Stephen Strange's spell, DODC agents Cleary and Sadie Deever launch an investigation into Jersey City resident and emerging superhero Kamala Khan, after she is suspected to have caused significant damages and injuries during the local AvengerCon exhibit. Their methods for tracking her draw significant controversy among the public, particularly garnering ire from the city's Muslim-American community upon their attempt to (in Cleary's case, reluctantly) raid a mosque related to Khan's associates. Eventually, Cleary orders Deever to forfeit the operation as a result of the public backlash, with Deever opting to proceed with capturing Khan, Kamran, and their friends at Coles Academic High School. Deever's raid subsequently draws the attention of Jersey City locals, allowing them to intervene and stop Damage Control from capturing Khan, who eventually flees the scene after consoling Kamran. The ensuing events cause Deever to be fired from her position by Cleary for her inability to comply with orders and for putting children at risk.

That same year, DODC agents arrive at an annual Awards Gala in Los Angeles, California to apprehend Jennifer Walters and put her in their supermax prison.

Cleary and the DODC agents hire Trevor Slattery to spy on actor Simon Williams, who possesses superpowers, knowing that Hollywood has a "Doorman Clause" that prohibits individuals with superpowers from playing any major roles in films or television shows, and that they are holding DeMarr Davis accountable for the disappearance of actor Josh Gad. After realizing their failure, the agents arrest Slattery, who revives his Mandarin persona and takes the blame for the explosion on the film set. Cleary reveals that ionic energy was detected at the explosion site and suggests that Williams could be a valuable asset to the agency, especially after Williams frees Slattery from prison.

The DODC was attacked by a telepath named Jean Grey. Some time ago, they arrested her sister, Sara, who also possessed telepathic powers. DODC official Bill Metzger subjected her to experiments attempting to replicate her abilities, ultimately killing her during one of the procedures. With Spider-Man's help, the DODC also subjected Jean to experiments until he discovered the truth. However, Jean unleashed her powers, becoming even more powerful and psionically sealing the city around her, taking control of the DODC and the Hand ninjas. Once everything returned to normal, the DODC was placed under investigation.

As of 2026, the group has appeared in six projects: the films Spider-Man: Homecoming, Spider-Man: No Way Home and Spider-Man: Brand New Day; and the Disney+ series Ms. Marvel, She-Hulk: Attorney at Law and Wonder Man.

=== Global Repatriation Council ===
The Global Repatriation Council, abbreviated as the GRC, is an international organization established by world governments following the Blip that is responsible for managing resources for refugees displaced by the Blip.

As of 2026, the group has appeared in one project: the Disney+ series The Falcon and the Winter Soldier.

=== Nova Corps ===
The Nova Corps was the intergalactic military and police force of the Nova Empire that was headquartered on the planet Xandar. Led by the Nova Prime, the Nova Corps initially arrest the Guardians of the Galaxy on Xandar after they cause a public disturbance and send them to the Kyln, a secure prison. Later, during the Battle of Xandar, the Corps defend Xandar from Ronan the Accuser along with the Guardians, but are almost completely obliterated by Ronan using the Power Stone. Following the battle, the Corps expunge each of the Guardians' criminal records in gratitude, while the Orb is placed in the Corps' possession for safekeeping. Four years later, the Nova Corps was presumed to have been annihilated by Thanos during the decimation of Xandar in search of the Power Stone as mentioned by Thor. Other notable members of the Corps include Rhomann Dey and Denarian Garthan Saal.

The film version of the Nova Corps acts as a traditional police force, with no mention of the Nova Force. When asked about a Nova solo movie, James Gunn said "I think there is always a chance of a Nova movie."

In an alternate universe, Nebula joined the Nova Corps after Ronan killed Thanos and Gamora, subsequently waging war on Xandar.

As of 2026, the group has appeared in three projects: the film Guardians of the Galaxy; and the Disney+ animated series What If...? and Marvel Zombies.

=== S.A.B.E.R. ===
The Strategic Aerospace Biophysics and Exolinguistic Response, better known by its acronym S.A.B.E.R., is a human-Skrull aerospace defense system founded in response to the Infinity War. After the Blip, it was spearheaded by Nick Fury and kept intel on current superheroes and new superheroes.

As of 2026, the group has appeared in three projects: the films Spider-Man: Far From Home and The Marvels; and the Disney+ series Secret Invasion.

=== S.H.I.E.L.D. ===
The Strategic Homeland Intervention, Enforcement, and Logistics Division, better known by its acronym S.H.I.E.L.D., is an intelligence agency founded by Peggy Carter, Howard Stark, and Chester Phillips following World War II as the successor to the Strategic Scientific Reserve. High-ranking agents and scientists throughout S.H.I.E.L.D.'s early history include Hank Pym, Janet Van Dyne, Arnim Zola, and Bill Foster; Pym and van Dyne operated covertly as the Ant-Man and the Wasp on behalf of S.H.I.E.L.D. from the 1960s until van Dyne's disappearance in 1987 and Pym's resignation in 1989, respectively. In the early 21st century, Nick Fury was promoted to the position of Director by Secretary Alexander Pierce, who was secretly working for Hydra. In 2010, Agent Phil Coulson was sent to speak with Tony Stark and Pepper Potts following his kidnapping in Afghanistan, but before he could do so Stark became involved in a battle with Obadiah Stane in an advanced armored suit. Later, in a press conference, Stark publicly declares himself as "Iron Man", prompting Fury to approach him on the "Avengers Initiative". S.H.I.E.L.D. was also involved in an attack by an army of unmanned drones at the Stark Expo, monitored the activity of Dr. Bruce Banner, witnessed the arrival of Thor in Puente Antiguo, New Mexico, and recovered the long-lost body of Captain America. In 2012, Fury assembled a team which consisted of six extraordinary individuals known as the Avengers in response to the theft of the Tesseract by Loki, leading to the Battle of New York. Following the incident, Fury secretly revives Coulson (who was killed by Loki) via Project T.A.H.I.T.I., while Rogers joins S.H.I.E.L.D..

In 2014, during the Hydra Uprising, Hydra was revealed to have been secretly infiltrating S.H.I.E.L.D. since the year it was founded, thanks to Zola, culminating in the destruction of the Triskelion, three Helicarriers, and Project Insight, along with the collapse of both S.H.I.E.L.D. and Hydra. In 2015, S.H.I.E.L.D. was secretly revived by Coulson and Fury, the latter assisting the Avengers during the Battle of Sokovia. In 2024, S.H.I.E.L.D. created a stealth suit for Peter Parker and an agent gave it to him when he was in Europe.

As of 2026, the group has appeared in the films Iron Man, The Incredible Hulk, Iron Man 2, Thor, Captain America: The First Avenger, The Avengers, Captain America: The Winter Soldier, Avengers: Age of Ultron, Ant-Man, Ant-Man and the Wasp, Captain Marvel, Spider-Man: Far From Home and Black Widow; the Marvel One-Shots The Consultant, A Funny Thing Happened on the Way to Thor's Hammer, Item 47, and Agent Carter; as well as the ABC series Agents of S.H.I.E.L.D. and the Disney+ series What If...?.

==== S.T.R.I.K.E. ====
The Special Tactical Reserve for International Key Emergencies, also known as S.T.R.I.K.E., is a unit of S.H.I.E.L.D. led by Steve Rogers, but also infiltrated by Hydra moles such as Brock Rumlow. A glimpse of S.H.I.E.L.D. records in The Avengers show that Natasha Romanoff and Clint Barton were partnered together under S.T.R.I.K.E. Team Delta.

As of 2026, the group has appeared in three projects: the films Captain America: The Winter Soldier and Avengers: Endgame; and the Disney+ animated series What If...?.

=== Strategic Scientific Reserve ===
The Strategic Scientific Reserve, or SSR, was a top secret Allied war agency during World War II, founded by Chester Phillips, Howard Stark and Peggy Carter, on the orders of Franklin D. Roosevelt. It was based in London. It was later replaced by S.H.I.E.L.D., with all operations taken over by Nick Fury.

As of 2026, the group has appeared in four projects: the film Captain America: The First Avenger; the Marvel Television series Agents of S.H.I.E.L.D. and Agent Carter; and the Disney+ animated series What If...?.

=== S.W.O.R.D. ===
The Sentient Weapon Observation and Response Division, better known by its acronym S.W.O.R.D., is an intelligence agency that was founded by Maria Rambeau. In 2020, Rambeau died from cancer, prompting Tyler Hayward to succeed her by becoming the new acting director. Under Hayward's directives, S.W.O.R.D. obtained the Vision's corpse and began the process of attempting to re-activate it. In 2023, two weeks following the Blip, Wanda Maximoff created an anomaly around the town of Westview, New Jersey, prompting S.W.O.R.D. to send one of its agents, Monica Rambeau, to assist FBI agent Jimmy Woo in investigating it. After Rambeau is accidentally sucked inside the anomaly, Hayward and other S.W.O.R.D. members set up a temporary response base outside the town, bringing in Darcy Lewis to further investigate the anomaly. Later, Hayward successfully re-activates the Vision through exposure to Wanda's power from a drone, and sends it inside the anomaly to kill Maximoff and the Vision simulacrum. Following a tense confrontation between the Maximoff family, S.W.O.R.D., and Agatha Harkness, Hayward is arrested, and Monica meets with a Skrull posing as an FBI agent.

S.W.O.R.D. was originally intended to appear in Thor, in a deleted post-credits scene wherein Erik Selvig tells Jane Foster and Darcy to "cross reference ... with the S.W.O.R.D. database". However, due to complications with 20th Century Fox, which owned the film rights to S.W.O.R.D. members Lockheed and Abigail Brand at the time, the scene was cut. The creative team behind the TV show Agents of S.H.I.E.L.D. intended to incorporate S.W.O.R.D., but were refused permission by Marvel Studios.

As of 2026, the group has appeared in one project: the Disney+ series WandaVision.

=== War Dogs ===
War Dogs (also called the Hatut Zaraze) are sleeper agents responsible for covert operations and gathering intelligence for Wakanda. They are branded with a tattoo on their lips to identify themselves when prompted. In 1992, King T'Chaka visited his brother N'Jobu in Oakland, California, where he was stationed as a War Dog. Revealing that he had sent Zuri to spy on him, T'Chaka demanded to know why N'Jobu had helped black-market arms dealer Ulysses Klaue steal a cache of vibranium from Wakanda before killing him in cold blood, in order to save Zuri's life.

In 2016, War Dog member, Nakia is rescued by T'Challa and Okoye whilst undertaking a mission in Nigeria, and is taken back to Wakanda to attend T'Chaka's funeral. Later, after N'Jadaka ascends to the Wakandan throne, he orders W'Kabi to deliver vibranium to War Dogs stationed around the world, but this plot was thwarted by resistance from T'Challa and his allies in Wakanda.

As of 2026, the group has appeared in two projects; the film Black Panther; and the Disney+ animated series Eyes of Wakanda.

=== World Security Council ===
The World Security Council is an international council formed of politicians from some of the world's most powerful countries that function as oversight for S.H.I.E.L.D. Its stated aims are facilitating cooperation in international law, international security, economic development, social progress, human rights, and achievement of world peace.

As of 2026, the group has appeared in three projects: the films The Avengers and Captain America: The Winter Soldier; and the Disney+ animated series What If...?.

== Others ==
=== Deadpool Corps ===
The Deadpool Corps is a team composed of many variants of Deadpool who are sent to the Void and their leader is Ladypool. They serve as allies of Cassandra Nova.

As of 2026, the group has appeared in one project: the film Deadpool & Wolverine (2024).

=== Einherjar ===
The Einherjar is the army of Asgard who have been serving the Asgardian throne since the time of Odin's father, Bor. Over the millennia, they have fought the Dark Elves, the Frost Giants, and the Marauders, as well as Hela and Thanos's forces. Their current leader is Tyr.

As of 2026, the group has appeared in six projects: the films Thor, Thor: The Dark World, Thor: Ragnarok, Avengers: Endgame, and Thor: Love and Thunder; and the Disney+ animated series What If...?.

=== Illuminati ===
The Illuminati is an organization established by an alternate version of Stephen Strange in Earth-838. They are intended to monitor and apprehend potential threats to the wider multiverse. Joining Strange as council members are Maria Rambeau / Captain Marvel, Peggy Carter / Captain Carter, Blackagar Boltagon / Black Bolt, Professor Charles Xavier, and Reed Richards. When Strange recklessly used the Darkhold to prevent Thanos's invasion of their world, he was deemed a threat to the multiverse by his peers, leading him to be executed by Boltagon and subsequently replaced by the succeeding Sorcerer Supreme, Karl Mordo. Some time later, the Illuminati arrest and imprison the Stephen Strange of Earth-616, as they fear he and his companion America Chavez pose a similar threat. However, their attempt to decide his fate is interrupted by a corrupted Wanda Maximoff from Earth-616, who infiltrates their headquarters and slaughters every member of the organization (except for Mordo) while Strange, Chavez and that reality's Christine Palmer pursue the Book of Vishanti to subdue her.

As of 2026, the group has appeared in one project: the film Doctor Strange in the Multiverse of Madness.

=== Masters of the Mystic Arts ===
The Masters of the Mystic Arts are an order of sorcerers dedicated to protecting the world from mystical threats. They originated in the time of Agamotto, and through the centuries developed into their current form. Notable current and former members include Dr. Stephen Strange, Wong, the Ancient One, Karl Mordo / Baron Mordo, Kaecilius, Jonathan Pangborn, Daniel Drumm, Hamir, Tina Minoru, Sol Rama, and Rintrah.

As of 2026, the group has appeared in five projects: the films Doctor Strange, Avengers: Endgame, and Doctor Strange in the Multiverse of Madness; and the Disney+ series What If...? and Marvel Zombies.

=== The Resistance ===
The Resistance is a resistance force in the Void against Cassandra Nova and her allies. The team consisted of Eric Brooks / Blade, Laura / X-23, Remy LeBeau / Gambit and Elektra Natchios. It also consisted of Johnny Storm / Human Torch, Frank Castle / Punisher, Matt Murdock / Daredevil, Peter Maximoff / Quicksilver and Erik Lehnserr / Magneto before their deaths. The team is later joined by Wade Wilson / Deadpool and Logan / Wolverine.

As of 2026, the group has appeared in one project: the film Deadpool & Wolverine.

=== Red Daggers ===
The Order of the Red Daggers, or simply Red Daggers, is an order of mystic warriors based in Pakistan and dedicated to protecting the world from inter-dimensional and supernatural threats. Specifically, they take interest in tracking down and eliminating the Clandestines, djinn who are trying to tear down the Veil of Noor in order to merge their home-world with Earth. Notable current and former members include Kareem and Waleed.

As of 2026, the group has appeared in one project: the Disney+ series Ms. Marvel.

=== Royal Yellowjackets ===
The Royal Yellowjackets are an army of musketeers with size-altering suits in a Renaissance-themed universe. They are under the command of Harold "The Happy" Hogan, who in turn serves King Thor.

As of 2026, the group has appeared in one project: the Disney+ animated series What If...?.

=== Salem Seven ===
The Salem Seven is a coven of witches and the children of Agatha Harkness' original coven whom she spared after killing their parents. Its members include "Vertigo", "Snake", "Crow", "Fox", "Rat", "Owl", and "Coyote".

As of 2026, the group has appeared in one project: the Disney+ series Agatha All Along.

=== Time Variance Authority ===
The Time Variance Authority logo

The Time Variance Authority, better known by its initialism TVA, is an organization located outside of space and time and was created by He Who Remains to ensure the preservation of the "Sacred Timeline". He Who Remains created the TVA to stop evil multiversal variants of himself from coming into being after a Multiversal War waged between them led to him destroying the multiverse to stop them, by keeping the "Sacred Timeline" in check. In building the TVA, he pulled variants of various people from across time, erased their memories, made them believe they and the TVA were created by the Time-Keepers, and built androids to serve as the Time-Keepers. Miss Minutes is the TVA's animated anthropomorphic clock mascot, and the Atlanta Marriott Marquis hotel was used to portray the TVA Headquarters.

In an alternate 2012 visited by the Avengers during their Time Heist, Loki escaped from Stark Tower with the Tesseract following his defeat, leading TVA agents to take him into custody. It is later revealed by Sylvie to Loki that all TVA agents are Variants taken from different timelines by He Who Remains. He Who Remains is murdered by Sylvie after she rejects his offer to run the TVA while Mobius and B-15 simultaneously shut down TVA operations after learning they are variants, reestablishing the multiverse. Loki seemingly finds himself in a new TVA before a stature of He Who Remains, with neither Mobius nor B-15 recognising him, only for it to be revealed that Loki had actually started experiencing time slipping due to He Who Remains and had been sent 400 years into the past of the TVA. Loki slipped between the past and the present until Mobius and TVA technician Ouroboros "O.B." helped to stabilize him. However, the Temporal Loom at the heart of the TVA started overloading, and Loki briefly slipped into the future where it was going critical, where the TVA was being evacuated. Working with his friends, Loki attempted to stop the meltdown and save the TVA, believing it to be the only protection from the variants of Kang that were coming.

After Loki reshaped the multiverse, including the Sacred Timeline, into a Yggdrasil-like tree, the TVA followed Loki's path, committing itself to protecting the multiverse and hunting for variants of Kang.

As of 2026, the group has appeared in three projects: the Disney+ series Loki; and the films Deadpool & Wolverine and Avengers Endgame: Encore.

== See also ==
- Characters of the Marvel Cinematic Universe
- Species of the Marvel Cinematic Universe
- Features of the Marvel Cinematic Universe
