= Straw Man (comics) =

Marvel Comics fictional character

- Straw Man as depicted on the cover of Doctor Strange, Sorcerer Supreme #38 (Feb. 1992). Art by Geof Isherwood.

Publication information
- Publisher: Marvel Comics
- First appearance: Dead of Night #11 (August 1975)
- Created by: Scott Edelman (writer); Rico Rival (artist)

In-story information
- Notable aliases: Scarecrow, Skirra Corvus
- Abilities: Superhuman strength Invulnerability except from fire Fear inducement Plant manipulation Portal creation Weather manipulation

The Straw Man, originally called the Scarecrow, is a fictional character appearing in American comic books published by Marvel Comics.

== Publication history ==
The Scarecrow was created by writer Scott Edelman and artist Rico Rival and first appeared in Dead of Night #11 (August 1975). Gil Kane and Bernie Wrightson provided the cover art. Artist Bill Draut was to have drawn the first appearance of the Scarecrow, but did not complete the assignment. The Scarecrow was originally scheduled to appear as a feature in Monsters Unleashed and Giant-Size Werewolf, but both of those series were cancelled before the Scarecrow feature could appear. It was then rescheduled for Dead of Night and after that series was cancelled as well, the character was to have a self-titled Scarecrow series, but it was not published. Edelman and artist Ruben Yandoc produced a follow-up story which appeared in Marvel Spotlight #26 (February 1976), and the story was eventually concluded by Bill Mantlo and Ron Wilson in Marvel Two-in-One #18 (August 1976).

Many years later, he was brought back in the pages of Dr. Strange, Sorcerer Supreme #31 (July 1991) in which he took on the name "the Straw Man" to differentiate himself from the costumed killer named the Scarecrow. He subsequently appeared in issues #38 and 40, meeting Daredevil in the latter issue.

The Scarecrow did not speak in his early appearances. However, in his later appearances he did and he pretended to be a newscaster named "Skirra Corvus", Latin for "Scarecrow".

== Fictional character biography ==
The Scarecrow is an extra–dimensional magical entity, possibly a demon, which takes vengeance on its enemies. He lives inside a palimpsest painting of a laughing scarecrow purchased by Jess Duncan and opposes the centuries-old Cult of Kalumai. The Scarecrow battled demons at a police station to recover the Horn of Kalumai, which would have allowed Kalumai to travel to Earth. Kalumai later spread his influence through the painting into a man who was mutated into a fiery creature and then fought the Thing and the Scarecrow. The Straw Man was invited by the Dweller-in-Darkness to join the Fear Lords, but he betrayed them to Doctor Strange.

During the Fear Itself storyline, the Straw Man fought against Nightmare's attempt to use the fear brought by the Serpent to become the King of Fear.

== Powers and abilities ==
The Straw Man possesses superhuman strength, plant and weather manipulation, the ability to command crows, the ability to create portals and the ability to induce fear in others. He is invulnerable to everything, except for fire.

== Reception ==
The Straw Man was ranked #30 on a listing of Marvel Comics' monster characters.
