= Cloak & Dagger (TV series) =

2018–2019 Marvel Television series

- Genre: Romance; Science fiction; Superhero; Teen drama
- Created by: Joe Pokaski
- Based on: Cloak and Dagger by: Bill Mantlo; Ed Hannigan
- Showrunner: Joe Pokaski
- Starring: Olivia Holt; Aubrey Joseph; Gloria Reuben; Andrea Roth; J. D. Evermore; Miles Mussenden; Carl Lundstedt; Emma Lahana; Jaime Zevallos
- Composer: Mark Isham
- Country of origin: United States
- Original language: English
- No. of seasons: 2
- No. of episodes: 20

Production
- Executive producers: Gina Prince-Bythewood (1x01 only); Alan Fine; Stan Lee; Joe Quesada; Karim Zreik; Jim Chory; Jeph Loeb; Joe Pokaski
- Producers: Barbara D'Alessandro (1x01 only); Paul Garnes
- Production location: New Orleans
- Cinematography: Tami Reiker (1x01 only); Cliff Charles
- Editors: Terilyn A. Shropshire; Ian Tan; William Yeh; Gena Bleier; L. Schroeder; Jon Koslowsky; Tucker Marolf
- Running time: 42–49 minutes
- Production companies: Wandering Rocks Productions; ABC Signature Studios; Marvel Television

Original release
- Network: Freeform
- Release: June 7, 2018 – May 30, 2019

Related
- Runaways; Marvel Cinematic Universe television series

Marvel's Cloak & Dagger, or simply Cloak & Dagger, is an American television series created by Joe Pokaski for Freeform, based on the Marvel Comics characters Cloak and Dagger. It is set in the Marvel Cinematic Universe (MCU), sharing continuity with the other television series of the franchise and acknowledging the continuity of the franchise's films. The series was produced by ABC Signature Studios, Marvel Television, and Wandering Rocks Productions, with Pokaski serving as showrunner.

The series stars Olivia Holt and Aubrey Joseph as Tandy Bowen / Dagger and Tyrone Johnson / Cloak, two teenagers with superpowers who form a partnership. A television series featuring the pair had begun development at ABC Family in July 2011. The channel, renamed Freeform, ordered Cloak & Dagger to series in April 2016, and Pokaski had joined as showrunner by that August. Holt and Joseph were cast in January 2017, with Gloria Reuben, Andrea Roth, J. D. Evermore, Miles Mussenden, Carl Lundstedt, Emma Lahana, and Jaime Zevallos also starring in the series. Filming for the series took place in New Orleans.

The first season aired from June 7 to August 2, 2018, and was met with positive reviews. Freeform renewed the series for a second season in July 2018, which premiered on April 4, 2019, and concluded on May 30, 2019. The series was canceled on October 24, 2019.

== Premise ==
In New Orleans, Louisiana, teenagers Tandy Bowen and Tyrone Johnson come from different backgrounds and have acquired superpowers after a life-changing event that revolved around the collapse of the Roxxon Gulf Platform. As their friendship unfolds, they soon realize that their powers work better when they are together. They use these powers to try to fix some of the wrong in the world.

In the second season, Tandy and Tyrone work to solve the abductions of women run by Andre Deschaine while dealing with Brigid O'Reilly's vigilante half Mayhem.

== Cast and characters ==
=== Main ===
- Olivia Holt as Tandy Bowen / Dagger:
  A teenager and street thief who is connected to Tyrone Johnson through a shared childhood tragedy, with the ability to emit light daggers. Showrunner Joe Pokaski felt Bowen in the series was "more cynical" than previous portrayals, and noted that when she touches people she can access their hopes and desires, saying, "There's something exciting about having a cynical character like Tandy who steals things and doesn't believe in the good of man, yet sees the best in them when she touches them". Rachel Ryals portrays a young Tandy.
- Aubrey Joseph as Tyrone Johnson / Cloak:
  A teenager, who is connected to Tandy Bowen through a shared childhood tragedy, with the ability to engulf others in darkness and transport them through the Darkforce Dimension. Johnson has the ability to witness people's fears, having been "living in a world of fear" since the death of his older brother Billy. Pokaski added, "There was something interesting in helping him to understand that everyone is afraid." Maceo Smedley III portrays a young Tyrone.
- Gloria Reuben as Adina Johnson: Tyrone's mother who invests heavily in making sure her son has a good life
- Andrea Roth as Melissa Bowen: Tandy's drug and alcohol-addicted yet optimistic mother
- J. D. Evermore as James Connors: An intimidating scar-faced detective of the New Orleans Police Department's vice squad with a secret
- Miles Mussenden as Otis Johnson: Tyrone's working class father who tries to provide for his family and is also an associate of the Wild Red Hawks. The character was originally announced as being named "Michael".
- Carl Lundstedt as Liam Walsh: Tandy's partner in crime and boyfriend in the first season
- Emma Lahana as Brigid O'Reilly / Mayhem:
  A detective from Harlem with hardened New York sensibilities who believes no one is above the law, including other cops. In the second season, Lahana also portrays Mayhem, the sinister vigilante half of O'Reilly. Pokaski wanted to avoid the typical "Dr. Jekyll and Mr. Hyde" type of story, and found it more interesting to have the personalities be separate entities that pursued different goals.
- Jaime Zevallos as Francis Delgado: A school counselor and priest who is constantly seeking redemption and questions the life he has chosen

=== Recurring ===
==== Introduced in season 1 ====
- Wayne Péré as Peter Scarborough: The chief executive of Risk Management at Roxxon who is responsible for confiscating Nathan Bowen's work following his death.
- Noëlle Renée Bercy as Evita Fusilier: A friend and love interest of Tyrone's. Bercy, who is from New Orleans, was familiar with the voodoo culture of the city, and was able to speak to people regarding it for her part.
- Dalon J. Holland as Duane Porter: A friend of Billy Johnson and acquaintance of Tyrone.
- Andy Dylan as Nathan Bowen: Tandy's father and former employee at Roxxon Gulf, who was killed in a car accident the night when the Roxxon Gulf platform collapsed.
- Marqus Clae as Billy Johnson: Tyrone's older brother who is shot and killed by Connors the night when the Roxxon Gulf Platform collapsed. Carsyn Taylor portrays a young Billy.
- Lane Miller as Kenneth Fuchs: A New Orleans police officer and O'Reilly's love interest.
- Gralen Banks as Choo Choo Broussard: A member of the Wild Red Hawk Mardi Gras tribe and friend of Otis Johnson.
- Angela Davis as Chantelle Fusilier: Evita's aunt who is a voodoo priestess and an expert on every divine pairing in New Orleans history.
- Ally Maki as Mina Hess: An environmental engineer at Roxxon Gulf who befriends Tandy. Hannah Hardin portrays a younger Mina.
- Tim Kang as Ivan Hess: Mina's father who worked with Nathan Bowen at Roxxon Gulf.

==== Introduced in season 2 ====
- Dilshad Vadsaria as Avandalia "Lia" Dewan:
  A struggling former medical student who leads the support group that Tandy and Melissa attend, and part of a sex trafficking ring in New Orleans that uses the Viking Motel as a front.
- Brooklyn McLinn as Andre Deschaine / D'Spayre:
  A former jazz musician who becomes a community leader for medical reasons, with emotion manipulating and despair-feeding abilities, and the leader of a sex trafficking ring in New Orleans where they use the Viking Motel as a front.
- Cecilia Leal as Mikayla Bell: A shy and insecure woman getting over abuse who joins a support group with Tandy and Melissa.
- Joshua J. Williams as Solomon: A young and sympathetic member of the Uptown Block Kings.

=== Guest ===
==== Introduced in season 1 ====
- Tim Bell as Bradford: A police officer and former partner of Detective Connors. He is later killed by Mayhem.
- Mike Donovan as Rick Cotton: A rich bachelor whom Tandy robs
- Gary Weeks as Greg Pressfield: Melissa's boyfriend who is a lawyer looking into the case involving Nathan Bowen's work at Roxxon
- Dalton E. Gray as Benny: One of Tyrone's basketball teammates
- Luray Cooper as "Big Chief" Roland Duplantier: The leader of a Mardi Gras tribe called the Wild Red Hawks and friend of Otis Johnson
- Vanessa Motta as a professional killer disguised as a water delivery person
- Andrea Frankle as Duchamp: The New Orleans Police Department's chief of police

==== Introduced in season 2 ====
- T.C. Matherne as Jeremy: Mikayla's abusive boyfriend
- John Fertitta as Senator Asa Henderson: James Connors' uncle. He is later arrested when his cover-up of Billy is exposed.
- Theodus Crane as Bo: A thug who is loyal to Lia and helps to keep an eye on the abducted women at the Viking Motel
- Bianca Santos as Del: An abandoned girl enslaved at the Viking Motel
- Justin Sams as Baron Samedi: A loa and the proprietor of the arcade in the Darkforce Dimension who held on to Cloak's soul. He released Cloak's soul when Evita had a loa wedding with him.

Maceo Smedley III, Lane Miller, and Devyn A. Tyler, who previously portrayed young Tyrone, Fuchs, and Tandy's ballet instructor from "Restless Energy", portray three different variations of Papa Legba.

== Episodes ==
Season	Episodes	Originally released	
Season	Episodes	First released	Last released
1	10	June 7, 2018	August 2, 2018
2	10	April 4, 2019	May 30, 2019

=== Season 1 (2018) ===
No. overall	No. in season	Title	Directed by	Written by	Original release date	U.S. viewers (millions)
1	1	"First Light"	Gina Prince-Bythewood	Joe Pokaski	June 7, 2018	0.919
2	2	"Suicide Sprints"	Alex García López	Joe Pokaski	June 7, 2018	0.750
3	3	"Stained Glass"	Peter Hoar	Story by : Ariella Blejer & Dawn Kamoche; Teleplay by : Peter Calloway	June 14, 2018	0.548
4	4	"Call/Response"	Ami Canaan Mann	Christine Boylan & Marcus J. Guillory	June 21, 2018	0.606
5	5	"Princeton Offense"	Ry Russo-Young	Niceole R. Levy & Joe Pokaski	June 28, 2018	0.509
6	6	"Funhouse Mirrors"	Jennifer Phang	J. Holtham & Jenny Klein	July 5, 2018	0.499
7	7	"Lotus Eaters"	Paul Edwards	Joe Pokaski & Peter Calloway	July 12, 2018	0.538
8	8	"Ghost Stories"	Alex García López	Christine Boylan & Jenny Klein	July 19, 2018	0.401
9	9	"Back Breaker"	Jeff Woolnough	Niceole R. Levy & Peter Calloway	July 26, 2018	0.531
10	10	"Colony Collapse"	Wayne Yip	Joe Pokaski	August 2, 2018	0.423

=== Season 2 (2019) ===
No. overall	No. in season	Title	Directed by	Written by	Original release date	U.S. viewers (millions)
11	1	"Restless Energy"	Jennifer Phang	Joe Pokaski	April 4, 2019	0.477
12	2	"White Lines"	Jeff Woolnough	Peter Calloway & Niceole R. Levy	April 4, 2019	0.399
13	3	"Shadow Selves"	Matt Hastings	Kate Rorick & Marcus J. Guillory	April 11, 2019	0.404
14	4	"Rabbit Hold"	Amanda Row	Joy Kecken & J. Holtham	April 18, 2019	0.385
15	5	"Alignment Chart"	Rachel Goldberg	Niceole R. Levy & Peter Calloway	April 25, 2019	0.359
16	6	"B Sides"	Lauren Wolkstein	Kate Rorick & Pornsak Pichetshote	May 2, 2019	0.311
17	7	"Vikingtown Sound"	Joe Pokaski	Joe Pokaski	May 9, 2019	0.306
18	8	"Two Player"	Jessika Borsiczky	Kate Rorick & Joy Kecken	May 16, 2019	0.235
19	9	"Blue Note"	Ami Canaan Mann	Alexandra Kenyon & Peter Calloway	May 23, 2019	0.324
20	10	"Level Up"	Philip John	Joe Pokaski	May 30, 2019	0.346

== Production ==
=== Development ===
At San Diego Comic-Con in 2011, head of Marvel Television Jeph Loeb announced the series Cloak & Dagger was in development at ABC Family. The series, which would be set in post-Hurricane Katrina New Orleans, would follow Cloak and Dagger as the two "find each other and realize that their powers both complement and complicate their lives." Around this time, Loeb had a meeting with ABC Family, who recommended Joe Pokaski to Loeb as a potential writer to work with Marvel Television, based on a script for another series the channel had recently received from Pokaski. Loeb reached out to Pokaski about working with Marvel, who was interested in writing Cloak and Dagger since "there's something that felt so right about them for the television format", and wrote the script. Pokaski was attracted to Cloak and Dagger as a television series, because the duo are the only people who understand each other's situations, compared to other coming-of-age teenage television series such as Buffy the Vampire Slayer or Smallville where the main characters have no one who can relate to them.

In April 2016, the series received a straight-to-series order for Freeform, the new name of ABC Family, from ABC Signature Studios and Marvel Television. By August 2016, Pokaski had signed on to the series as showrunner and executive producer. Pokaski noted his script had "sat in a drawer for five years", before Freeform executive Karey Burke found it and "took a chance on it". Loeb, Jim Chory, Alan Fine, Stan Lee, Joe Quesada, and Karim Zreik also serve as executive producers. On July 20, 2018, Freeform renewed the series for a 10-episode second season, which premiered on April 4, 2019. The series was canceled on October 24, 2019.

=== Writing ===
When announcing the series, Freeform called it their "first venture into the Marvel Cinematic Universe", and described it as a "superhero love story", a premise that Variety called "a seamless fit for Freeform" given the channel's target audience of "Becomers" (the 14–34 age demographic). Addressing this, Loeb said, "It's a love story that happens to have characters that have always traditionally been in that age group. It's not like we took something and made it into a Young adult fiction. It speaks to a YA audience and is a YA property. Would I do Punisher on Freeform? I don't think that's going to connect the same way." Pokaski was pleased with the diversity of the writers for the first season, with a majority of black writers and many women writers. He stated, "It all starts with representation ... We make sure our writers room is filled with as many people who do not look like me as possible. We have really good writers who allow ourselves a wide enough berth to have real conversations and find the truth across our experiences. ... It's what people talk about a lot but we try to actually execute it."

The majority of the writers from the first season returned for the second. The second season would explore the themes of women's rights and issues through Mina Hess, while "continuing to drive the conversation forward about race in America".

Pokaski spoke about the differences in Cloak and Dagger's origin story from the comics, saying, "I think the original [comic] stories were fantastic, but for the time, while they were a little progressive, they were a little bit sexist and racist once you got into it, for now. What we tried to do was deconstruct it and make it about Tandy and Tyrone, understand who they were." Since the original comics "are a little dated", Pokaski and the writers could to make adjustments accordingly as Cloak and Dagger do not have an established comics mythology, making sure "we were telling the right story for now". He also felt Loeb's idea of having the duo live in New Orleans, opposed to New York City as in the comics, was a "great idea". Since Marvel was also developing The Defenders at the same time, moving to the New Orleans setting "came up pretty early", since Pokaski felt New York City of the Marvel Cinematic Universe had enough superheroes. When looking for alternate locations, and considering places with filming tax incentives, New Orleans "felt so right for Tandy and Tyrone. It felt gothic, it felt a little bit dark, it felt like a place of light and shadow. The more we learned about the city and about its history and about voudon or the Mardi Gras Indians, it felt like it was the only place for Tandy and Tyrone to start."

Pokaski did not want to rush the romantic relationship between the duo in the first season, and hoped the series would last long enough to allow for "an interesting path to their relationship." Pokaski intended to create 100 episodes for the series, and had "a definitive plan for five season".

=== Casting ===
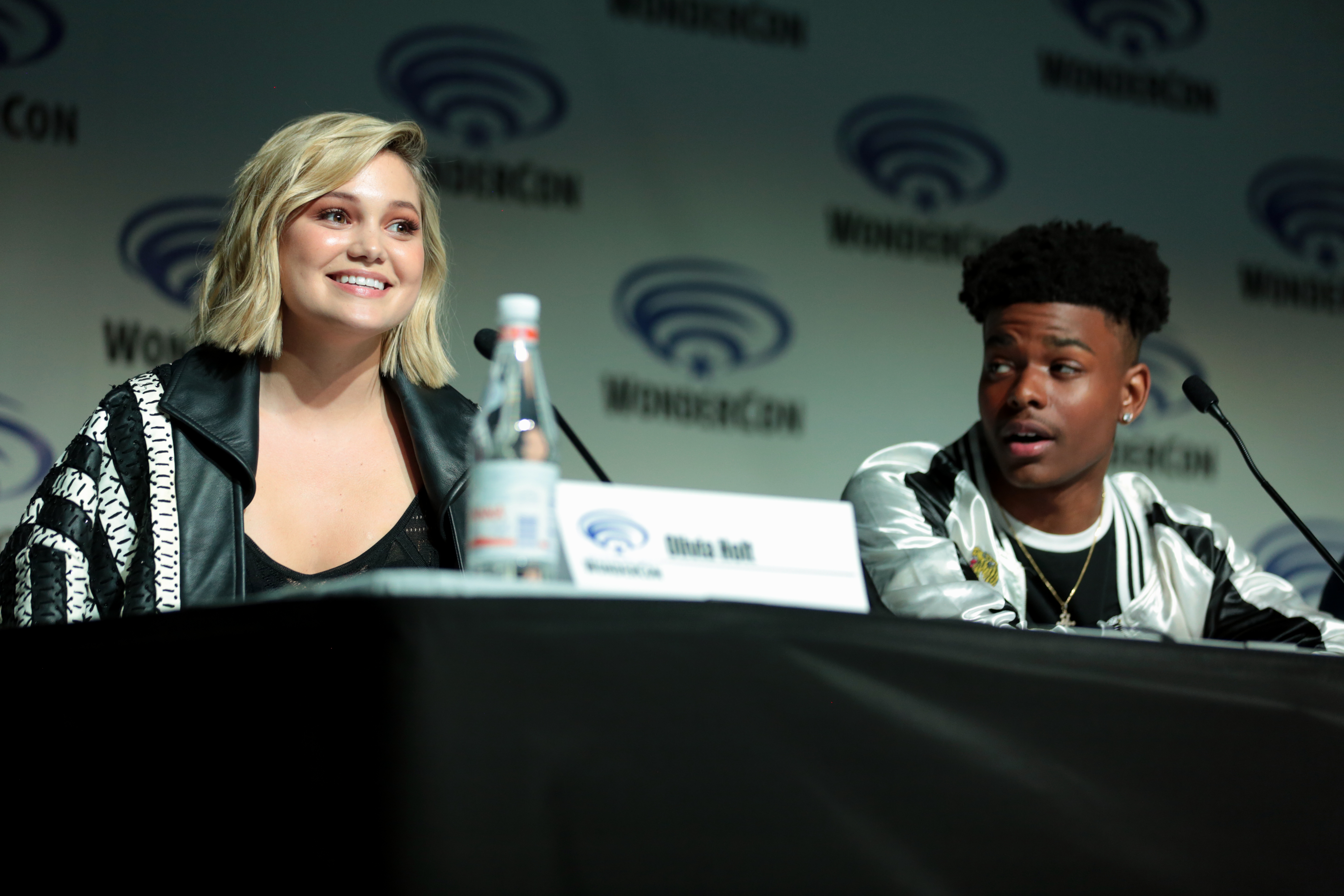
Olivia Holt and Aubrey Joseph at WonderCon 2018 promoting Cloak & Dagger

In January 2017, Olivia Holt and Aubrey Joseph were cast as Tandy Bowen / Dagger and Tyrone Johnson / Cloak, respectively. Gina Prince-Bythewood, the director of the first episode, called the casting process "really, really tough ... it was three days before we were supposed to leave [to begin filming] and we didn't find [actors for Tandy and Tyrone]. People started getting willing to settle and the people that were on the table were 27, 28. They felt grown and it didn't feel right for the show. Then Aubrey and Olivia walked in the door, and they had such great chops individually."

The following month, Andrea Roth was cast as Melissa Bowen, Tandy's mother; Gloria Reuben and Miles Mussenden were cast as Tyrone's parents, Adina and Otis Johnson; and Carl Lundstedt and J. D. Evermore were cast as Liam Walsh and James Connors, respectively. Emma Lahana and Jaime Zevallos also were cast as Brigid O'Reilly and Francis Delgado.

=== Filming ===
Filming for the series took place in New Orleans, with the first season using the working title Shadows. Tami Reiker served as cinematographer for the first episode. Because of other commitments, she did not plan to continue with the series, and, along with Prince-Bythewood, recommended Cliff Charles to replace her, who served as cinematographer on the remaining episodes of season one. The first season features many hand-held camera shots that established the "look and feel" of the series, in part because Pokaski "didn't want to wait for a dolly track to be laid".

=== Music ===
Mark Isham announced in May 2017 that he would compose the music for the series. Multiple songs are featured throughout the first season, some of which were collected and released on a digital soundtrack album on June 8, 2018, by Marvel Music and Hollywood Records. An album featuring Isham's score was released digitally on July 6.

=== Marvel Cinematic Universe tie-ins ===
Freeform executive Karey Burke said in April 2017 that the series is "not particularly connected" to New Warriors, which was slated to air on Freeform at the time, given "their tones are so wildly different", adding, "There are many degrees of separation with where they fall in the Marvel universe. But anything is possible with Marvel." In July, Loeb said there were no plans to crossover, nor to crossover across networks with the similarly themed Runaways on Hulu. He added that Marvel wanted the series to find its footing before further connecting with other elements of the Marvel Cinematic Universe, saying "You'll see things that comment on each other; we try to touch base wherever we can ... things that are happening in L.A. [where Runaways is set] are not exactly going to be affecting what's happening in New Orleans ... It's being aware of it and trying to find a way for it to be able to discuss in a way that makes sense."

Ahead of the series premiere, considering the larger events of the MCU at that point, Pokaski said he was "not allowed to talk about" how the series would connect to the events of Avengers: Infinity War but stated "We've had some exciting conversations about how we could artfully cross Tandy and Tyrone over [to other Marvel properties]. The beauty of these two is that they can show up anywhere [and it makes sense]." After the first-season finale, Pokaski expanded, saying he would "love" to have Tandy and Tyrone appear in the MCU films "as utility players the way they are in comics", but conceded "there are a lot of legal hurdles and corporate barriers to doing that". Regarding a crossover with the Runaways, Pokaski noted "there's hopefully there's some karma we can fulfill there" since the duo in the comics appear early in the Runaways comic series.

Roxxon Gulf, a division of the Roxxon Corporation company that has been featured throughout the MCU, is seen in the first season. The Darkforce dimension which fuels Cloak's powers was previously established in Agents of S.H.I.E.L.D. and Agent Carter. Pokaski stated that "There are at least a dozen Easter eggs in the first season that Marvel approved, and a few more that I snuck in there." O'Reilly discusses formerly working in Harlem and her friend Misty Knight in the series, while her move to New Orleans is mentioned by her former New York colleagues in the second season of Luke Cage. Loeb noted the Luke Cage references were "not by mistake", with the potential for them to have become something more, such as having Simone Missick, who portrays Misty Knight, appearing in the series. Tony Stark and Danny Rand are also mentioned in the series. A newspaper article about Luke Cage, written by Karen Page, including a picture of the titular character portrayed by Mike Colter, is prominently featured in the second season.

In August 2019, it was announced Holt and Joseph would appear in the third season of Runaways.

== Release ==
Cloak & Dagger aired in the United States on Freeform and on ABC Spark in Canada, while Amazon Video aired the series in the United Kingdom and select additional European countries.

== Reception ==
=== Ratings ===
Viewership and ratings per season of Cloak & Dagger
Season	Timeslot (ET)	Episodes	First aired		Last aired		TV season	Avg. viewers (millions)	Avg. 18–49 rating
Season	Timeslot (ET)	Episodes	Date	Viewers (millions)	Date	Viewers (millions)	TV season	Avg. viewers (millions)	Avg. 18–49 rating
1	Thursday 8:00 pm	10	June 7, 2018	0.919	August 2, 2018	0.423	2017–18	0.572	0.20
2	Thursday 8:00 pm	10	April 4, 2019	0.477	May 30, 2019	0.346	2018–19	0.355	0.12

Cloak & Dagger had the best series launch on Freeform in two years and Freeform's most-watched drama since "Till Death Do Us Part", the series finale of Pretty Little Liars in June 2017. After three days, "First Light" had 1.64 million total viewers, which was a 78% increase from its initial viewers, the largest three-day lift for any Freeform debut. "First Light" also had the biggest digital debut ever for the network, with 716,000 starts. The premiere drew 7.3 million views across linear and digital platforms and was Thursday's most-social scripted series with 112,000 engagements across Twitter, Instagram, Facebook and Tumblr.

=== Critical response ===
Critical response of Cloak & Dagger
Season	Rotten Tomatoes	Metacritic
1	89% (54 reviews)	68 (15 reviews)
2	86% (7 reviews)	—N/a

For the first season, the review aggregation website Rotten Tomatoes reported an 89% approval rating based on 54 reviews, with an average rating of 7.5/10. The website's critical consensus reads, "Cloak & Dagger blends soapy drama with superhero grit to create an exciting, surprisingly thoughtful addition to the genre — even if it falls prey to a certain amount of narrative bloat." Metacritic, which uses a weighted average, assigned a score of 68 out of 100 based on reviews from 15 critics, indicating "generally favorable reviews".

The second season has an 86% approval rating on Rotten Tomatoes, based on 7 reviews, with an average rating of 9.1/10.

=== Analysis ===
Upon the series' announcement, Vulture's Abraham Riesman wrote that Marvel had a unique opportunity with the series to tell a story "without needing to appeal to any kind of rabid fanbase or honor any iconic stories," because the characters have neither "any famous archnemeses," nor "a widely read graphic novel" that fans would be expecting to see. He concluded, "Cloak & Dagger could be something unique and potentially lovely: an attempt to build a new bit of filmed superhero iconography (mostly) from the ground up. There's so much to mine in this genre. It deals metaphorically with the burdens, risks, and liberations of power—and it has the storytelling freedoms offered by high-concept science fiction, fantasy, and magical realism." Pokaski revealed in August 2018 that he sent Riesman's article to Karey Burke and other executives on the series as encouragement for the direction they were planning to take the series, and to confirm that what they had released about the series did not sound "like we were blowing smoke".

=== Accolades ===
Year	Award	Category	Nominee(s)	Result	Ref.
2018	People's Choice Awards	The Sci-Fi/Fantasy Show of 2018	Cloak & Dagger	Nominated	
2018	Teen Choice Awards	Choice Summer TV Show	Cloak & Dagger	Nominated	
2018	Teen Choice Awards	Choice Summer TV Star	Olivia Holt	Won	
2018	Teen Choice Awards	Choice Summer TV Star	Aubrey Joseph	Nominated	
2019	Saturn Awards	Best Superhero Television Series	Cloak & Dagger	Nominated	
2019	Teen Choice Awards	Choice Fantasy Sci/Fi Actor	Aubrey Joseph	Nominated	
2019	Teen Choice Awards	Choice Fantasy/Sci-Fi Actress	Olivia Holt	Nominated	
