= Brooklyn McLinn =

American actor

- Born: Brooklyn L. McLinn; Inglewood, California
- Education: California State University, Northridge
- Occupation: Actor
- Years active: 1998–present

Brooklyn L. McLinn is an American actor and former basketball player.

== Biography ==
Brooklyn McLinn was born in Inglewood, California and raised in Sherman Oaks. He grew up in a "two bedroom, one bathroom duplex" and had to share a room with three elder brothers. He started acting in school and studied hard to the point that he graduated high school by the age of 16. He decided to pursue a basketball career and played professionally overseas in Taiwan and Mexico.

McLinn later decided to pursue acting instead and booked roles on television advertisements such as Gatorade, Coors and Domino's Pizza. He made appearances on major television series such as Justified, Days of Our Lives, Hawthorne, Parenthood and Rules of Engagement.

In 2019, McLinn joined the cast of Marvel's Cloak & Dagger for season 2.

== Filmography ==
Film roles
Year	Title	Roles	Notes
2000	Through Thick and Thin	David	Short film
2003	Ride or Die		Direct-to-video
2004	Sleepover	Bartender	
2008	Smokeless	Darius	Short film
2009	Dough Boys	Nate	
2009	See Dick Run	D-Man	
2009	Nobody Knows	Cinematography	Short film
2010	The Company We Keep	Harrison	
2011	Friends with Benefits	Policeman	
2011	He's Mine Not Yours	Randy	
2015	Sister Code	Rick	
2020	After the Reign	Matt, News Anchor	

Television roles
Year	Title	Roles	Notes
1998	Getting Personal	Assistant director	Episode: "Bring in 'Da Milo, Bring in 'Da Robyn"
1998	Getting Personal	Steve	Episode: "The Wedding Zinger"
2002	The Shield	Dmitri	Episode: "Pilot"
2006	Eve	Mike	Episode: "Diva Day Care"
2007	All of Us	Fitz Escoffrey	Episode: "He's Got Game"
2007	Ghost Whisperer	Rescue Crew Foreman	Episode: "Weight of What Was"
2008	NCIS	Sergeant Jim Gilroy	Episode: "In the Zone"
2008	Rita Rocks	Roger	Episode: "You Gotta Have Friends"
2009	Meteor	Medic	Miniseries
2009	Three Rivers	Medic	2 episodes
2009	Buppies	Derek	Recurring role
2009	Tyler Perry's House of Payne	Karl the Bartender	Episode: "Till Payne Do We Part"
2009–2010	Diary of a Single Mom	Sam Sr.	Recurring role
2010	Days of Our Lives	Al	2 episodes
2010	Sons of Tucson	Fireman Randy	Episode: "Ron Quits"
2010	Hawthorne	Evan Whitlock	Episode: "Hidden Truths"
2010–2012	Rules of Engagement	Dan	3 episodes
2010–2014	Parenthood	Sekou Trussell	Recurring role
2011	Lbs	Mangnum	Episode: "The Other Man"
2011	Justified	Johnson	Episode: "Save My Love"
2011	Champion Road the Series	John Merser	Miniseries
2011	Bones	Flannigan	Episode: "The Memories in the Shallow Grave"
2012	The Exes	Walter	Episode: "Cool Hand Lutz "
2012	Finding My Obama	Terrance	1 episode
2012	CSI: NY	Tony Davis	Episode: "Misconceptions"
2012	Family Trap	Barry	TV Pilot
2013	The Haves and the Have Nots	Detective Logan	4 episodes
2013	Rizzoli & Isles	Tyrell Feeney	Episode: "In Over Your Head"
2013	The Hustle	Mark	Main cast
2013	Love That Girl!	Melvin	Episode: "The Best Man for the Job"
2014	The Queen Latifah Show	Hunky Fireman	Episode: "Actor Eric Dane and "True Blood's" Ryan Kwanten!"
2014	Key & Peele	Secret Service	Episode: "Alien Impostors"
2015	Shameless	Officer Klein	Episode: "Crazy Love"
2015	Welcome to the Family	Terrence	TV movie
2016	Goliath	Detective Kauzor	Episode: "Beauty and the Beast"
2016	Black-ish	Napoleon	2 episodes
2016	The Infamous	Lamont Lake	TV Pilot
2017	Happily Never After	Nick	TV Pilot
2019	Cloak & Dagger	D'Spayre / Andre Deschaine	Recurring role (season 2)
2023	Bel-Air	Doc Hightower	Recurring role season 2
