= Nightmare (Marvel Comics) =

Marvel Comics supervillain

- Textless cover for The Incredible Hercules #118 (August 2008). Art by John Romita Jr.

Publication information
- Publisher: Marvel Comics
- First appearance: Strange Tales #110 (July 1963)
- Created by: Stan Lee; Steve Ditko

In-story information
- Species: Demon
- Team affiliations: Fear Lords
- Abilities: Nigh-omnipotence; Psychic vampirism

Nightmare is a supervillain appearing in American comic books published by Marvel Comics. He first appeared in Strange Tales #110 and was created by Stan Lee and Steve Ditko. The character is depicted most commonly as a major enemy of Doctor Strange and Ghost Rider. Nightmare is the ruler of a Dream Dimension and he is one of the Fear Lords. He is also part of the group called the Six-Fingered Hand. He can drain the psychic energies from the subconscious minds of dreaming beings.

== Publication history ==
Nightmare first appeared in Strange Tales #110 (the first appearance of his enemy, Dr. Strange) and was created by Stan Lee and Steve Ditko.

== Fictional character biography ==
Nightmare is the evil ruler of the "Dream Dimension", where tormented humans are brought during their sleep. He roams this realm on his demonic black horned horse, Dreamstalker. In physical form, he appears as a chalk-white man with green hair, a green suit, and a ragged cape. He was the first foe met by Doctor Strange when a man who was having troubling dreams went to Strange for help, though it turned out to be repressed guilt for an act of murder. Nightmare traps Strange in his realm and tries to feed on his power. However, Strange escapes the Dream Dimension after tricking Nightmare with an illusion of his enemies.

Nightmare is a necessary part of human existence; without him to regulate fear through dreaming, humans would slowly be driven insane. At one point, Strange is forced to aid Nightmare to save him from being killed by an inability to create new dreams.

Nightmare also serves under Shuma-Gorath and warned Strange that the demon would be a force that even the Sorcerer Supreme would have trouble defeating, and he once joined the Fear Lords, a group of supernatural creatures who fed on fear, to attack Strange together. Their plans are undone when D'Spayre tricks him into competing with the Dweller-in-Darkness over who could frighten humanity more; recognizing that this would only allow D'Spayre to surpass them both in power, the two entities call a truce.

Nightmare is the father of Dreamqueen, a similar being who rules her own "dream dimension". She was conceived when Nightmare impregnated a succubus named Zhilla Char.

Nightmare's realm is not part of the Mindscape, but the Sleepwalkers are aware of him and consider him an enemy. Because Sleepwalkers do not have to sleep, Nightmare is unable to affect them. He seeks to do so by tormenting Rick Sheridan, the host of an individual Sleepwalker who had been trapped in his mind. Nightmare attempts to convince Sleepwalker that Rick is safe, but he is not fooled and sacrifices his chance to return to the Mindscape to stop Nightmare.

In the Tempest Fugit storyline of The Incredible Hulk, it is revealed that Nightmare has been plaguing the Hulk for years with hallucinations, misdirections, and manipulations of reality, by empowering himself. His second, more benevolent, daughter Daydream is also introduced in this story arc. Nightmare claimed that this daughter was conceived by forcibly entering the mind of the Hulk's late wife, Betty Ross and raping her in her sleep. The Hulk kills Nightmare in retaliation, but he later returns to life.

When Hercules and the God Squad journey to the Skrull gods' realm during the Secret Invasion storyline, they learn that they need a map of the Dreamtime to access the realm. Nightmare agrees to give them the map in exchange for access to the fears of the five gods; however, he actually intends to use these divine fears to conquer the world. Hercules and the others escape his realm, having stolen the map via trickery as Amatsu-Mikaboshi had created a shadow duplicate of himself to fool Nightmare. Nightmare summons an army of monsters to attack the group, but they escape.

In "Dark Reign", it was revealed that Trauma is Nightmare's son and inherited part of his power over fear, being able to transform into the worst fears of those near him. Nightmare later manifests on Earth and battles the Avengers Resistance and the Initiative.

During the Chaos War storyline, Nightmare's realm trieds to torture Hercules with visions of Amatsu-Mikaboshi. Nightmare attempts to join Amatsu-Mikaboshi's forces, but he is not tricked by his begging and kills him.

Nightmare is later seen tormenting Loki as part of a plan to garner greater powers in The Terrorism Myth storyline. Loki challenges Nightmare to a duel to the death, with the loser giving up their immortality. Nightmare accepts and is killed by Loki in the ensuing battle. Following the death of Doctor Strange, Nightmare returns. Left unopposed by Strange, Nightmare attacks Cyclops, Jean Grey, and X-23.

== Powers and abilities ==
Nightmare is a virtually omnipotent entity who rules the Dream Dimension and can draw power from psychic energy in subconscious minds.

== Other versions ==
An alternate universe version of Nightmare from Earth-1610 appears in the Ultimate Marvel imprint. This version is able to transform into various forms derived from his victim's memories.

== In other media ==
=== Television ===
- Nightmare appears in The Super Hero Squad Show episode "Blind Rage Knows No Color!", voiced by Jim Parsons.
- Nightmare appears in Ultimate Spider-Man, voiced by Mark Hamill.

=== Film ===
Nightmare appears in Hulk: Where Monsters Dwell, voiced by Matthew Waterson.

=== Video games ===
- Nightmare appears in Marvel Super Hero Squad: The Infinity Gauntlet, voiced again by Jim Parsons.
- Nightmare appears in Lego Marvel Super Heroes, voiced by Greg Cipes.
- Nightmare appears in Lego Marvel Super Heroes 2 via the "Cloak and Dagger" DLC.

=== Miscellaneous ===
- Nightmare appears in the novel Doctor Strange, Master of the Mystic Arts: Nightmare, by William Rotsler.
- Nightmare appears in the audio book The Ultimate Super Villains, by Steve Rasnic Tem.
- Nightmare appears in The Avengers: Earth's Mightiest Heroes #11.
