= Daredevil (video game) =

2003 video game for the Game Boy Advance

- North American box art
- Developer: Griptonite Games
- Publishers: Encore Software; THQ
- Platform: Game Boy Advance
- Release: NA: February 4, 2003; EU: February 28, 2003
- Genre: Action
- Mode: Single-player

Daredevil is a video game released for the Game Boy Advance in 2003. It is based on the Marvel Comics character Daredevil and is a tie-in to the live-action 2003 film of the same name.

== Plot ==
Daredevil's largest role was as the title character in the Game Boy Advance game based on the 2003 film.

Stick appears as a supporting character. In the beginning of the game, he informs Daredevil that the Kingpin has put a price on Daredevil's head. After Daredevil defeats Kirigi, he mentions that the Kingpin has a mysterious connection to the Sewer King. When Daredevil beats Echo, he warns Daredevil that Bullseye is waiting for him at a construction site.

Kirigi is a boss in the game. In the game, he believes that Daredevil was working for the Kingpin and he has sent the Daredevil to kill him, since the Hand was at war with the Kingpin's gang. Kirigi is seemingly killed by Daredevil after he defeats him.

Echo is a boss in the video game. In the game, she is a villain, and she believes that Daredevil was never in league with the Kingpin in the first place. After chasing Echo throughout the New York Subway Transit System, Daredevil defeats her.

Bullseye appears as a boss. In this game, he waits for Daredevil at a construction site. Daredevil reveals to Bullseye that the bounty on Daredevil's head was a fraud. Bullseye believes this but he reveals to Daredevil that he was in league with the Kingpin. At the top of the construction site, Daredevil defeats Bullseye. Unlike his movie and comics counterpart, Bullseye uses a handgun as his weapon.

The Kingpin is the final boss in the video game. In the game, he puts out a warrant out for Daredevil's arrest to the criminal underworld (which is later revealed as a fraud). Daredevil interrogates the Kingpin at his penthouse, where it is revealed that Daredevil eliminated his competition when he was setting up his master plan. After Daredevil defeats him, the Kingpin tells him that although Daredevil knows his secret identity, Daredevil cannot reveal Wilson Fisk's identity as the Kingpin to the police. At the end, Fisk lies to the reporters by saying that Daredevil's arrest was a "media distortion".

== Publication history ==
The Game Boy Advance game was released on February 14, 2003, and was created by Encore, a subsidiary of Navarre Corporation.

It was developed by Griptonite Games and published by THQ and BAM! Entertainment.

== See also ==
- Daredevil in other media, other Daredevil appearances in video games
