= D'Spayre =

Marvel Comics character

- D'Spayre as depicted in The Uncanny X-Men #144 (April 1980). Art by Brent Anderson

Publication information
- Publisher: Marvel Comics
- First appearance: Marvel Team-Up #68 (April 1978)
- Created by: Chris Claremont; John Byrne

In-story information
- Species: Demon
- Team affiliations: Fear Lords
- Notable aliases: D'Spayre often masquerades as persons trusted by his victims
- Abilities: Superhuman strength and durability; Levitation; Dimensional travel; Telepathy; Illusion casting; Ability to instill fear in human beings and to draw psychic sustenance from the fear, anguish and despondency suffered by human beings

D'Spayre (sometimes D'spayre) is a fictional character appearing in American comic books published by Marvel Comics. He is a demon, and was one of the Fear Lords. He has been opposed by Spider-Man, Scarlet Spider, Man-Thing, Cyclops, Hulk, Juggernaut, Doctor Strange, Cloak and Dagger, and the New Avengers.

The character was portrayed by Brooklyn McLinn in the second season of the Marvel Cinematic Universe television series Cloak & Dagger.

== Publication history ==
D'Spayre first appeared in Marvel Team-Up #68 (April 1978). He was created by writer Chris Claremont and penciller John Byrne.

== Fictional character biography ==
D'Spayre. Art by Brent Anderson.

D'Spayre is a creation of the Dweller-in-Darkness, a powerful demon who created him to act as an agent on Earth while the Dweller-in-Darkness is banished from Earth. D'Spayre's first action is to kill the sorceress Zhered-Na, who had banished his creator. Over the next millennia, D'Spayre repeatedly fights Dakimh the Enchanter, Zhered-Na's student. D'Spayre captures Dakimh and pupil Jennifer Kale, but is defeated by Spider-Man and Man-Thing.

D'Spayre tends to prey on victims who are in despair, using their fear and despair to strengthen himself. He terrorizes Scott Summers and Lee Forrester after Forrester's father commits suicide, but is defeated by Summers, who resists D'Spayre's illusions and finds resolve in the memory of Jean Grey. This resolve fuels Man-Thing, who attacks D'Spayre, and D'Spayre flees. He then attacks Doctor Strange when Strange is feeling distraught over separation from his girlfriend Clea, but Strange defeats D'Spayre as well, the first of many battles between them. D'Spayre impersonates Dakimh in an attempt to Doctor Strange into despondency.

Together with Nightmare, he later attempted to victimize Betty Ross, but was thwarted by the Hulk. He was next defeated and temporarily weakened by Rachel Summers.

D'Spayre turning to face the Man-Thing. Art by Brent Anderson.

Over the years, D'Spayre has tried to bring many heroes to despair, resulting in numerous failures. In one instance, he manipulates the Fear Lords, powerful demons and gods who feed upon humanity's fears into creating the Great Fear. With their powers combined, the Fear Lords believe that they can plunge humanity into a permanent state of terror. Most of the Fear Lords are defeated by Doctor Strange, but Nightmare and the Dweller-in-Darkness manage to create the Great Fear. They then discover that D'Spayre has been manipulating them, as the Great Fear causes so much terror in humans that they stop fearing and succumb to despair, thereby feeding D'Spayre who becomes more powerful than the two of them. Doctor Strange manages to stop D'Spayre, while the Fear Lords flee.

D'Spayre is revealed to have infused Cloak and Dagger with portions of his soul, called the Dark Form and Light Form, respectively. He is the creator of the drug D-Lite, which granted Cloak and Dagger their powers.

D'Spayre attempts to enhance his power by using a Cosmic Cube to draw on the grief of the general public in the aftermath of Captain America's death. His use of the Cosmic Cube grants the 'wish' of those who wanted Captain America back by drawing the Invaders into the present. D'Spayre is defeated in a confrontation with the New Avengers when Echo proves immune to his powers due to her deafness, allowing her to take the Cube from him.

== Powers and abilities ==
D'Spayre's demonic nature provides him with superhuman strength and durability and the ability to levitate himself and to travel between dimensions. D'Spayre also has the mystical ability to instill fear in human beings and to draw psychic sustenance from the fear, anguish, and despondency suffered by human beings, and other mystical abilities. He has telepathic abilities enabling D'Spayre to perceive a victim's psychological vulnerabilities and to project illusions into the victim's mind. He has a vulnerability to physical harm when weakened by lack of psychic sustenance, and his powers rely on people hearing his words, allowing the deaf Echo to defeat him.

D'Spayre created Darklight (also known as D-Lite), an addictive drug inducing pain in its victims.

== In other media ==
A character loosely based on D'Spayre appears in the second season of Cloak & Dagger, portrayed by Brooklyn McLinn. This version is Andre Deschaine, a former jazz musician who gave up his career due to developing severe headaches after a performance in which he attempted to hit a special "blue note". The headaches led him to attempt suicide by jumping off of a bridge just as a nearby Roxxon oil platform exploded. After being exposed to the energies that were released, Deschaine gained the ability to drain people's hopes, which allow him to feed off of their despair to relieve his headaches.
