= Dweller-in-Darkness =

Marvel Comics fictional character

- The Dweller in Darkness as depicted in Doctor Strange Vol. 3 #30. Art by Geof Isherwood.

Publication information
- Publisher: Marvel Comics
- First appearance: Doctor Strange (vol. 3) #30 (August 1978)
- Created by: Roger Stern; Tom Sutton

In-story information
- Species: Demon
- Team affiliations: Fear Lords
- Notable aliases: He Who Dwells in Darkness
- Abilities: Fear generation Immortality; Superhuman strength

He Who Dwells in Darkness, or simply the Dweller-in-Darkness, is a fictional character appearing in American comic books published by Marvel Comics. He is a demon, one of the Fear Lords, who has clashed with Doctor Strange.

The character made its film debut in the 2021 Marvel Cinematic Universe film Shang-Chi and the Legend of the Ten Rings.

== Publication history ==
The Dweller-in-Darkness was first mentioned in Thor #229-230 (Nov.–Dec. 1974), by Gerry Conway and Rich Buckler. The character is first fully revealed in Doctor Strange #30 (Aug. 1978), by Roger Stern and Tom Sutton.

The character subsequently appears in Doctor Strange #32-33 (Dec. 1978, Feb. 1979), #35-37 (June–Oct. 1979), Fantastic Four Annual #23 (1990), Doctor Strange, Sorcerer Supreme #31-33 (July–Sept. 1991), #38-40 (Jan.–March 1992), and Adventures of the X-Men #11-12 (Feb.–March 1997).

The Dweller-in-Darkness received an entry in The Official Handbook of the Marvel Universe: Horror #1 (2005).

== Fictional character biography ==
The Dweller-in-Darkness originates from the dimension of Everinnye. In the universe which existed before the current reality, the Dweller caused a fracture in the M'Kraan Crystal, intending to destroy the universe and absorb the fear of every living being there. Just before the crystal shattered, the Phoenix Force foiled the Dweller's scheme. As the universe came to an end, the current Marvel Universe was born.

In the new universe, the Dweller-in-Darkness continues to feed upon fear, which sustains him. The Atlantean sorceress Zhered-Na discovers the existence of the Dweller and banishes him with the help of Agamotto and the Atlantean god Valka. When Atlantis sinks, the Dweller absorbs the fear of the inhabitants, creates D'Spayre, and orders him to kill Zhered-Na in revenge. D'Spayre manipulates a tribesman to kill Zhered-Na. Zhered-Na's student, Dakimh the Enchanter, battles D'Spayre over the next millennia, while D'Spayre attempts to generate enough fear on Earth to free his creator.

The Dweller gathers his fellow Fear Lords and tells them of his plans to create the Great Fear: a terror which will engulf humanity. In fact, the Dweller hopes that the other Fear Lords will be destroyed by Doctor Strange. Most of the Fear Lords agree, but the Straw Man, who is benevolent to humanity, disagrees with their plan and warns Strange. Several of the Fear Lords are destroyed by Strange and his allies, but D'Spayre tells Nightmare about the Dweller's true plans. Nightmare and the Dweller battle, generating so much fear that humanity stops fearing and started to despair. D'Spayre feeds on the despair and becomes more powerful than the two of them. Realizing that D'Spayre had manipulated them, the Dweller attacks him, but D'Spayre destroys his body. The Dweller's head, the only remaining part of his body, escapes.

== Powers and abilities ==
The Dweller has the ability to generate fear in other living beings. This fear in turn sustains and empowers the Dweller, allowing him to generate even more fear. He also has other undefined mystical powers: he can create independent creatures out of fear like D'spayre and he can turn humans who die under his influence into Shade Thralls, beings made of shadow with superhuman strength. Strong light can kill or banish these thralls.

The Dweller is immortal, does not age, and even the sorceress Zhered-Na, assisted by powerful beings like Agamotto and Valka, could only banish him, not destroy him.

The "Way of the Shamblu", the Dweller's chosen path in life, involved a ritual where the Dweller removed his head from his own body. His body died, but his head lived on, now as a corporeal being, whereas the other inhabitants of Everinnye are more ethereal. The Dweller's head is attached to a robotic body, which possesses superhuman strength, but it can detach and move with the tentacles near its mouth in case of emergency.

== In other media ==
=== Film ===
The Dweller-in-Darkness appears in Shang-Chi and the Legend of the Ten Rings. This version is a wyvern-like, soul-consuming demon kept imprisoned for thousands of years by the people of Ta-Lo. The Dweller uses its powers to convince Xu Wenwu that it is Wenwu's deceased wife Ying Li, having attempted a similar trick a number of times before with other people, and manipulates Wenwu into using his Ten Rings to release him. The Dweller kills Wenwu and has its minions kill Death Dealer and many others after being freed, but is defeated by Shang-Chi, Katy, Xialing, and the Great Protector.

=== Video games ===
- The Dweller-in-Darkness appears as a boss in Marvel Avengers Academy.
- The Dweller-in-Darkness appears as a boss in Marvel's Guardians of the Galaxy. This version is a pet and minion of Lady Hellbender.
