= Daredevil in other media =

Depictions of Daredevil outside comics

Adaptations of Daredevil in other media
- The logo for the Netflix television series Daredevil
- Created by: Stan Lee; Bill Everett; Jack Kirby
- Original source: Comics published by Marvel Comics
- First appearance: Daredevil #1 (April 1964)

The Marvel Comics character Daredevil has appeared in various other media since his debut in Daredevil #1 (April 1964).

== Television ==
=== Live-action ===
- In 1975, Angela Bowie secured the TV rights to Daredevil and the Black Widow for a duration of one year and planned a TV series based on the two characters. Bowie had photographer Terry O'Neill take a series of pictures of herself as Black Widow and actor Ben Carruthers as Daredevil (with wardrobe by Natasha Kornilkoff) to shop the project around to producers, but the project never came to fruition.
- In 1983, ABC planned a Daredevil pilot. Writer Stirling Silliphant completed the draft, but it was not aired.
- Daredevil appears in The Trial of the Incredible Hulk, portrayed by Rex Smith. This version was inspired by a police officer to become a hero. Additionally, he wears a black ninja-like outfit, a variation of which would later appear in Frank Miller and John Romita Jr.'s 1993 Daredevil: The Man Without Fear miniseries.

=== Animation ===
- Matt Murdock appears in a flashback in the Spider-Man and His Amazing Friends episode "Attack of the Arachnoid", voiced by Frank Welker.
- In the 1980s, ABC had planned a Daredevil television series that would have featured a guide dog named "Lightning the Super-Dog". Television writer Mark Evanier said in 2008 that he was the last in a line of writers to have written a pilot and series bible, with his including Lightning as a regular guide dog.
- Daredevil appears in Spider-Man: The Animated Series, voiced by Edward Albert. This version's blindness occurred after he accidentally witnessed his father Jack Murdock taking part in crime.
- Daredevil appears in the Fantastic Four (1994) episode "And a Blind Man Shall Lead Them", voiced by Bill Smitrovich.
- Production stills for a proposed Daredevil animated series meant to air on Fox Kids were made.
- Daredevil makes a non-speaking cameo appearance in the X-Men '97 episode "Tolerance is Extinction - Part 3".

== Film ==
- Ben Affleck portrays Matt Murdock / Daredevil in Daredevil (2003). Affleck also filmed a cameo appearance for the spin-off Elektra (2005), which was deleted but later included in the director's cut.
- A young, alternate version of Matt Murdock, based on the Spider-Gwen incarnation, makes a brief non-speaking cameo appearance in the animated film Spider-Man: Into the Spider-Verse (2018). This version is the adopted son of the Kingpin.

== Marvel Cinematic Universe ==
Matt Murdock / Daredevil is portrayed by Charlie Cox in media set in the Marvel Cinematic Universe (MCU).

Cox's appearances as Daredevil in the MCU include the television series Daredevil (2015–2018), The Defenders (2017), She-Hulk: Attorney at Law (2022), Echo (2024), and Daredevil: Born Again (2025–present), and the film Spider-Man: No Way Home (2021). He also voices an alternate version of the character in the first season of the Disney+ animated series Your Friendly Neighborhood Spider-Man (2025).

== Video games ==
- Daredevil makes a cameo appearance in Venom/Spider-Man: Separation Anxiety.
- Daredevil appears as an asset character in Spider-Man: Web of Fire.
- Daredevil appears in Spider-Man (2000), voiced by Dee Bradley Baker.
- Daredevil appears as the title character of the Daredevil film tie-in game.
- Daredevil was meant to appear in Daredevil: The Man Without Fear for the PC, PlayStation 2, and GameCube before it was cancelled. However, in 2023, an unfinished playable prototype of the game for PlayStation 2 was made available online. The prototype received a generally positive response.
- Daredevil appears as a playable character in Marvel Nemesis: Rise of the Imperfects, voiced by Mark Hildreth.
- Matt Murdock makes a cameo appearance in The Punisher, voiced by Steve Blum.
- Daredevil appears as an unlockable character in Marvel: Ultimate Alliance, voiced by Cam Clarke.
- Daredevil appears as a playable character in Marvel: Ultimate Alliance 2, voiced by Brian Bloom. In the PS2, PSP and Wii versions, he serves as a boss for the pro-Registration campaign.
- Matt Murdock makes a cameo appearance in Chris Redfield's ending for Marvel vs. Capcom 3: Fate of Two Worlds. Additionally, he appears in the Shadowland stage for Ultimate Marvel vs. Capcom 3 and as a card in the Heroes vs. Heralds mode. Moreover, the Marvel Zombies incarnation of Daredevil makes a cameo appearance in Frank West's ending.
- Daredevil appears as a playable character in Marvel Super Hero Squad Online, voiced by Tom Kenny.
- Daredevil appears in LittleBigPlanet via the "Marvel Costume Kit 1" DLC.
- Daredevil appears as a playable character in Marvel Avengers Alliance.
- Daredevil appears as a playable character in Marvel Heroes, voiced again by Brian Bloom.
- Daredevil appears as a playable character in Lego Marvel Super Heroes, voiced again by Steve Blum.
- Daredevil appears as a playable character in Marvel Contest of Champions.
- Daredevil appears as a playable character in Marvel: Future Fight.
- Daredevil appears as a playable character in Lego Marvel's Avengers, voiced by Roger Craig Smith.
- Daredevil appears as an unlockable playable character in Marvel Avengers Academy. This version is a member of the Defenders.
- Daredevil appears as a playable character in Marvel: Avengers Alliance 2.
- Daredevil appears as a playable character in Lego Marvel Super Heroes 2.
- Daredevil appears as a playable character in Marvel Strike Force. This version is a member of the Defenders and Shadowlands teams. His default costume is based on his appearance in the Daredevil television series while his Shadowlands outfit appears as an alternate skin.
- Daredevil appears as a playable character in Marvel Ultimate Alliance 3: The Black Order, voiced again by Brian Bloom.
- Daredevil appears as a playable character in Marvel Puzzle Quest.
- Daredevil appears as a purchasable outfit in Fortnite Battle Royale.
- Daredevil appears in Marvel Snap.
- Daredevil appears as a playable character in Marvel Rivals, voiced by Aleks Le.
- Daredevil appears as a playable character in Marvel Mystic Mayhem, voiced again by Aleks Le.

== Merchandise ==
- Daredevil received an action figure in the Secret Wars toy line despite not appearing in the miniseries of the same name.
- Daredevil in his red and yellow-and-black suits, based on Joe Quesada's design, received action figures in the "Spider-Man Classics" line.
- Daredevil, based on Ben Affleck's portrayal, received an action figure in the original run of Marvel Legends toy line.
  - Daredevil in his red and yellow-and-black suits received action figures in the "Marvel Legends Showdown" sub-line.
- Daredevil received a statue in The Classic Marvel Figurine Collection.
- Daredevil received an action figure in the Marvel Universe line.

== Miscellaneous ==
- Daredevil received a figure in the HeroClix miniatures game.
- Daredevil was announced for the Marvel Crisis Protocol miniatures game.
- The Daredevil comics The Man Without Fear and Guardian Devil were adapted into full-cast dramatised audiobooks by GraphicAudio. AudioFile magazine gave the production a positive review, stating that "the sound effects make listeners feel as if they're side by side with Daredevil."
- An audio adaptation of the reboot of Daredevil was released and performed by Marvel staff, with Mark Waid narrating the panels, and editor Tom White voicing Daredevil himself.
