= Medallion (The Secret Circle) =

- The Secret Circle episode
- Diana (Shelley Hennig) at Adam's (Thomas Dekker) birthday party
- Episode no.: Season 1 Episode 13
- Directed by: Liz Friedlander
- Written by: Andrew Miller; Andrea Newman
- Production code: 2J6263
- Original air date: February 2, 2012

Guest appearances
- Chris Zylka; Adam Harrington; Lauren Stamile; Sammi Rotibi; Michael Graziadei

Episode chronology
← Previous "Witness"	Next → "Valentine"

"Medallion" is the 13th episode of the first season of the CW television series The Secret Circle, and the series' 13th episode overall. It was aired on February 2, 2012. The episode was written by Andrew Miller & Andrea Newman and it was directed by Liz Friedlander.

== Plot ==
A strange woman appears at Cassie's (Britt Robertson) door and introduces herself as Lucy (Lauren Stamile). Lucy is a psychic and she was on the boat sixteen years ago when the fire started. She came to Cassie because she saw her on the boat, meaning when Cassie was there through Jake's (Chris Zylka) memory and that the reason she came is to warn her about the witch hunters who are coming to kill her.

Cassie is talking to Jake about Lucy and they both go together to find her at the place she is staying. Lucy tells them that she has information about the medallion Cassie found and she knows the ritual to activate it, but the whole Circle has to be present to make the spell. Cassie tells her to meet them in the woods behind the house later at night to do the ritual.

Adam (Thomas Dekker) is worried about Cassie and the dark magic taking over her and he doesn't agree with them activating the medallion. Cassie says that it's the only way to protect the Circle and everyone agrees leaving Adam no choice than to agree.

In the meantime, Ethan (Adam Harrington) wants to organize a birthday party for Adam and he is asking for Diana's (Shelley Hennig) help, while Faye (Phoebe Tonkin) and Melissa (Jessica Parker Kennedy) try the Devil's Spirit Faye took from Callum (Michael Graziadei).

Meanwhile, Charles (Gale Harold) meets Dawn (Natasha Henstridge) and warns her that he will take the crystal back from Ethan and he threatens her that if she gets in his way again, he will kill her. Charles drugs Ethan at Adam's birthday party and takes the crystal back.

Dawn finds out that Lucy is back in town since she had marked her sixteen years ago and she meets her in her room. They talk about what happened back then and that Lucy betrayed them since, as John Blackwell's psychic, she should have warned him about the witch hunters. To make up for that, Dawn is asking Lucy to help her locate the rest of the crystals and Lucy agrees.

Later, Lucy goes to Dawn's house to do the ritual for the crystals, but instead she stabs Dawn and kills her revealing at the same time that she was always on the right side, the witch hunters. She is here now to help them again destroy the new Circle. Charles finds Dawn and he uses the crystal to bring her back to life.

The Circle meets Lucy as they said and she guides them through a spell. The spell though instead of activating the medallion, it's absorbing the magic from the members of the Circle. When they realize that, Cassie uses the medallion to scare Lucy and make her tell them why she is really in town. Lucy admits the truth and Cassie lets her go with a message for the witch hunters.

The episode ends with Lucy meeting the leader (Sammi Rotibi) of the witch hunters, the same man who killed the Circle's parents sixteen years ago, telling him what happened. After her failure he kills her, while Cassie is trying to communicate with her father through the medallion.

== Reception ==
=== Ratings ===
In its original American broadcast, "Medallion" was watched by 1.75 million; up 0.12 from the previous episode.

=== Reviews ===
"Medallion" received mediocre reviews.

Katherine Miller from The A.V. Club gave a C+ rate to the episode saying that the episode was boring and stiff. "So here we are again, Secret Circle. You’re weirdly fashioned like a hang-out show, even though your characters don’t like each other and never talk to each other. You need to be a plot show. You have the pieces, please arrange them better..."

Carissa Pavlica from TV Fanatic rated the episode with 3.5/5 saying that the episode was full or twists that she had felt they were coming. ""Medallion" was full of twists that I felt coming... but I didn't know just how twisted they might get. Some fairly big knots were tied and it seems we will be dealing with the consequences of this episode for some time to come."

Sarah Maines from The TV Chick said that this episode was another boring one. "Another week, another stiff and boring episode of Secret Circle. All of the pieces are there to create an fun show, but the magic still isn’t there (horrible pun intended). One day, I hope this show figures out that it needs to be a plot heavy show; sadly, today was not that day."

Tyler Olson from Crimson Tear said that the series had been taking a dark path. "It seems like everyone new always has an ulterior motive when they first show up in this town. More lies, and more killing people with knives, which leads to an even more angrier Cassie. All that was missing was more heartbreak, but I am sure that will happen next episode."

== Feature music ==
In the episode "Medallion" we can hear the songs:

- "Gold Sneakers" by Wax Idols
- "The Devil Takes Care Of His Own" by Band Of Skulls
- "A.I.M. Fire!" by Art vs Science
- "Electric Lovers" by Scraping For Change
- "War In Heaven" by The Raveonettes
