= Return (The Secret Circle) =

- The Secret Circle episode
- John Blackwell (Joe Lando) has returned to Chance Harbor. Here with Cassie (Britt Robertson)
- Episode no.: Season 1 Episode 15
- Directed by: Brad Turner
- Written by: David Ehrman
- Production code: 2J6265
- Original air date: February 16, 2012

Guest appearances
- Adam Harrington; Joe Lando; Grey Damon; Sammi Rotibi; Alexia Fast; Michael Graziadei

Episode chronology
← Previous "Valentine"	Next → "Lucky"

"Return" is the 15th episode of the first season of the CW television series The Secret Circle. It aired on February 16, 2012. The episode was written by David Ehrman and directed by Brad Turner.

== Plot ==
John Blackwell (Joe Lando) appears on Cassie's (Britt Robertson) doorstep telling her that he is her father and that he came because he felt her energy when she used the medallion. He asks her not to tell anyone that he is back and to meet him later to talk. Cassie tells Adam (Thomas Dekker) despite her father's request and Adam tells Cassie to not meet him alone because he doesn't trust him after everything they heard about him.

Cassie meets her father but when he asks for the medallion she realizes that he is here for the medallion and not for her. Saying that Adam was right about him, she leaves. After getting into her car the leader of the witch hunters, Eben (Sammi Rotibi), drugs her and takes her away.

Jake (Chris Zylka) is looking for Cassie but he can't find her. Instead, he meets Blackwell. Suspecting that Cassie might be a captive of the witch hunters, Jake runs to find them and trade her life for Blackwell's. Eben is surprised that Blackwell is alive and he accepts the offer. He does not kill Cassie but he does cast a spell on her.

Jake meets Blackwell again and he takes him to the witch hunters. They exchange Cassie for Jake, not for Blackwell, and Jake is wondering why they take him. Eben tells him that Cassie will kill her father so he won't have to do it and then he attempts to kill Jake. The rest of the Circle members get there in time stopping Eben and saving Jake's life.

Meanwhile, Cassie already started the ritual to kill Blackwell. Even if she can understand what she is doing, she can't stop because she is under a spell. The Circle gets there and all together, manage to free Cassie from the spell. They save Blackwell but now they are all wondering how Eben managed to do a spell since he is not a witch.

In the meantime, Callum (Michael Graziadei) invites Melissa (Jessica Parker Kennedy) and Faye (Phoebe Tonkin) to a party. Faye declines his offer but Melissa accepts it and goes. In the party, Callum is making a voodoo trick with a totum similar to the one Lee (Grey Damon) gave to Faye and he understands that Melissa is a witch.

Faye and Diana (Shelley Hennig) worry about Melissa spending time with Callum and they ask Lee's help to find her. When they do, Melissa tells Faye that Lee lied to her and that the totum is not giving energy but takes it instead. Faye is mad at Lee for using her and she leaves him alone.

Later, Lee appears to her house to prove to her that he really cares about her and he is not using her. He breaks the totum in front of her but at the same moment, his girlfriend (Alexia Fast) who's in coma, wakes up.

The episode ends with Blackwell visiting Jake and asking him to work with him and help him protect Cassie because he saw that Jake really cares about her.

== Reception ==
=== Ratings ===
In its original American broadcast, "Return" was watched by 1.76 million; down 0.06 from the previous episode.

=== Reviews ===
"Return" received positive reviews.

Katherine Miller from The A.V. Club gave a B− rate to the episode.

Carissa Pavlica from TV Fanatic rated the episode with 4.5/5 stating that this might have been the best episode of The Secret Circle.

Sarah Maines from The TV Chick said that the episode successfully built on its momentum from last week. "Overall, another entertaining episode. Two weeks in a row! Secret Circle is on a roll!"

== Feature music ==
In the episode "Return" we can hear the songs:

- "Youth" by Razika
- "Maniac" by Clap Your Hands Say Yeah
- "As Long As You Like" by Afrobeta
- "I Want You" by Bo Molasses
- "City Girl" by The Jezabels
- "Fallin" by JMSN
