= Witness (The Secret Circle) =

- The Secret Circle episode
- On "Witness", Cassie (Britt Robertson) travels back in time to find out what happened in the boat fire
- Episode no.: Season 1 Episode 12
- Directed by: Eagle Egilsson
- Written by: Dana Baratta
- Production code: 2J6262
- Original air date: January 19, 2012

Guest appearances
- Chris Zylka; Adam Harrington; Grey Damon; Sammi Rotibi; Michael Graziadei

Episode chronology
| ← Previous "Fire/Ice" | Next → "Medallion" |

"Witness" is the 12th episode of the first season of the CW television series The Secret Circle, and the series' 12th episode overall. It was aired on January 19, 2012. The episode was written by Dana Baratta and it was directed by Eagle Egilsson.

== Plot ==
Jake (Chris Zylka) is back in Chance Harbor to warn Cassie (Britt Robertson) about the witch hunters. He tells her that Isaac (JR Bourne) is not interested in killing her anymore because he does not know how to kill a witch with dark magic but the council does. The last time the council tried to kill a witch with dark magic was sixteen years ago when they killed her dad. He tries to convince her that the only way to save herself and the Circle, is to find out what exactly happened in the fire back when their parents died.

Jake explains that he was working on a memory spell that will take them on the boat before the fire started. Cassie can get into his memories, since Jake was there but his mind has blocked the events, and they can see what happened. Adam (Thomas Dekker) does not agree with the plan since he thinks it is too risky and they are not sure if it is going to work.

Cassie agrees to go on with the spell despite the disagreement. She and Jake do it and they manage to get on the boat and see their parents. Something is not going well and Jake returns to the present, while Cassie stays back and follows Jake's parents. She sees that they wanted to make a truce with the witch hunters but the whole truce plan was a trap and the witch hunters murdered them instead. She also sees Adam's dad, Ethan (Adam Harrington), leaving the boat just before the fire starts.

The witch hunters try to kill John Blackwell using a ritual, but Blackwell uses a medallion and manages to save himself and kill the witch hunters. Cassie sees that the fire was started by the witch hunters and not by their parents as they all believed since now. Blackwell drops the medallion and leaves the boat.

Cassie describes to Jake, Adam and Diana (Shelley Hennig) what she saw and Jake now knows that witchcraft was not what killed his parents but the witch hunters. They also now know that John Blackwell did not die on that boat as everyone says and they wonder if he is still alive. When Cassie says that he saw Adam's father on the boat, Adam says that is impossible because his father told him that he was not there when the fire happened, something that makes them wonder why Ethan would lie about it. Cassie does not mention the medallion and she returns to the boat alone to find it.

In the meantime, Dawn (Natasha Henstridge) tries to get closer to Charles (Gale Harold) and the crystal but he has been avoiding her. When her attempts fail and Charles tells her that he knows she is up to something and he will find out what it is, she goes to Ethan for help. She manipulates him by telling him that Charles tried to chock her after a fight they had, that he killed Henry and that he has a crystal that helps him practice magic.

Ethan calls Charles telling him that he knows about what he is doing and Charles tries to meet him. Ethan manages to take the crystal from him but Charles tells him that Dawn is the one who killed Henry. When Dawn comes to Ethan asking for the crystal, Ethan is not willing to give it to her.

Meanwhile, Faye (Phoebe Tonkin), not wanting to have anything to do with the members of the Circle after what happened, starts hanging out with Lee (Grey Damon). Things get a little dangerous when she meets Lee's friend Callum (Michael Graziadei), who is a drug dealer, and he tells her about "The Devil's Spirit". Faye shows to be interested on that drug.

The episode ends with Jake and Cassie digging Blackwell's grave because they want to know if he is really dead. When they open the coffin though, they see bones of an animal buried in it instead of human's.

== Reception ==
=== Ratings ===
In its original American broadcast, "Witness" was watched by 1.63 million; down 0.30 from the previous episode.

=== Reviews ===
"Witness" received positive reviews.

Katherine Miller from The A.V. Club gave a B+ rate to the episode saying that the show finally is getting a direction. "After six months of casually alluding to it, The Secret Circle finally ventured into the vaunted boat fire mystery that killed a dozen people 17 years ago, via Cassie incepting Jake. And after my huff last week about this show idling around without direction, this show finally rattled some momentum together."

Matt Richenthal from TV Fanatic rated the episode with 4.1/5. "An interrupted kiss. A showdown between Cassie crushes. The revelation that witch hunters are adept at a ritual to remove dark magic and this was exactly what went down 16 years ago during the infamous, deadly fire on the docks.Yes, it's safe to say The Secret Circle got off to an intriguing start on "Witness," as all these developments took place before the eerie "duh, duh, duh, da-duh..." of the opening credits."

Sarah Maines from The TV Chick said that now that we had seen what happened in the past, it's time the story to move forward. "This all comes from a place where I really like about half of the show and am just tired of dragging my way through the other half every week. This show should be FUN; it has the potential to be fun, but it isn’t. Not yet at least, and I’m not sure how much longer I want to wait."

Tyler Olson from Crimson Tear said that this episode changes so much. "Overall, it was a really entertaining episode. Lots of twists and story, but still mixed with just the right amount of action to prevent viewers to get overloaded."

== Feature music ==
In the "Witness" episode we can hear the songs:

- "Only For You" by Heartless Bastards
- "I Had It Coming" by White Rabbits
- "Sand" by Promise And The Monster
- "Moving On" by The Grates
