= Fire/Ice =

- The Secret Circle episode
- Faye (Phoebe Tonkin) is trying to get her solo magic back with Lee's (Grey Damon) help
- Episode no.: Season 1 Episode 11
- Directed by: Joshua Butler
- Written by: Holly Henderson; Don Whitehead
- Production code: 2J6261
- Original air date: January 12, 2012

Guest appearances
- Chris Zylka; Grey Damon; Adam Harrington

Episode chronology
← Previous "Darkness"	Next → "Witness"

"Fire/Ice" is the 11th episode of the first season of the CW television series The Secret Circle, and the series' 11th episode overall. It was aired on January 12, 2012. The episode was written by Holly Henderson and Don Whitehead and it was directed by Joshua Butler.

== Plot ==
Another school dance is happening in town, this time called Fire/Ice, while Cassie (Britt Robertson) tries to find out more about her father and who he really was by reading her mother's Book of Shadows. Diana (Shelley Hennig) tries to make her forget and focus on the dance instead, but a spell they attempt, turns into a failure.

Cassie and Adam (Thomas Dekker) try to find anything they can about John Blackwell and they take a walk at the City's Records. The only thing they find under his name is a residence, only to discover that this residence is the abandoned house they use as their shelter. Cassie and Adam go to the house trying to find anything that might belonged to Cassie's father and they find a strange symbol on the basement's ceiling.

Cassie tries to find out what the strange symbol means in her Book of Shadows, but the page that explains the symbol has been ripped out of the book. She suspects that Faye is the one who took it since she was the only one who had the book except from her. Melissa (Jessica Parker Kennedy) covers for Faye when Cassie calls her asking for the page. Later, Adam tells Cassie that the symbol is used for channeling dark magic.

Meanwhile, Lee (Grey Damon) comes to school to find Faye (Phoebe Tonkin) and it seems that he knows more about witches than Faye believes. He explains to her that the spell she brought him is a spell that extracts the magic from the person who owns the book and gives it to someone else. Faye finds this very interesting and she agrees to do the spell so she can get Cassie's dark magic.

Lee casts the spell but it has consequences for the rest of the Circle. While at first it seems like nothing is happening to Cassie, the other three members of the Circle start falling apart since the moment the spell was done as well as every time Faye is using magic. When Faye realizes about it, she immediately reverses it. The Circle conflicts with her and what she did and Faye abandons them being angry with them.

The episode ends with Cassie and Adam at the house's basement trying to understand why John Blackwell put that symbol on the ceiling and what he was trying to do with it. They end up kissing when Jake (Chris Zylka) walks in.

== Reception ==
=== Ratings ===
In its original American broadcast, "Fire/Ice" was watched by 1.93 million; down 0.12 from the previous episode.

=== Reviews ===
"Fire/Ice" received mediocre reviews.

Katherine Miller from The A.V. Club gave a C+ rate to the episode. "Please, Secret Circle: Pick two or three storylines and start threading these things together. Give somebody a clue about what happened to Nick or Henry or Jane, make the circle work together solving the mystery, and let’s roll."

Carissa Pavlica from TV Fanatic rated the episode with 3.7/5. "We are directly in the middle of the season so anything could happen. Dark magic is far more fun than Bewitched style enchantment, but if the circle is the end game, they're going to have to give us a reason to want them to fight together, and perhaps against a common enemy. They're still all over the Chance Harbor map."

Sarah Maines from The TV Chick said that the episode's theme (Cassie's growing dark magic) sounds more exciting than it really is. "Back in the fall when Secret Circle introduced dark magic into the equation, I thought we were on the edge of the show morphing into something great. Two episodes into the latter half of the season and all that potential has yet to transform into a consistently awesome show. The show vacillates between being a fun ride and completely boring. Sadly, this week’s episode fell into the boring category."

Tyler Olson from Crimson Tear said that it was a good episode overall, story wise. "Overall, this was a good episode story wise, but I still felt disappointed on how it played out. There is lots of dark energy being built up, but the releases seem to be just a smoke show so far. Perhaps they are just holding them back for a big finish. There also needs to be more outside conflict again as it has now just resorted to fighting amongst themselves."

== Feature music ==
In the "Fire/Ice" episode we can hear the songs:

- "Don't Move" by Phantogram
- "Just A Little Bit" by Fairview
- "Lessons In Love" by Kaskade
- "Rapunzel" by Drapht
- "Take It Back" by Toddla T
- "Room For Happiness" by Kaskade
- "Gold On The Ceiling" by The Black Keys
