= Valentine (The Secret Circle) =

- The Secret Circle episode
- The girls, Diana (Shelley Hennig) and Melissa (Jessica Parker Kennedy) celebrating Valentine
- Episode no.: Season 1 Episode 14
- Directed by: Dave Barrett
- Written by: Roger Grant
- Production code: 2J6264
- Original air date: February 9, 2012

Guest appearances
- Grey Damon; JR Bourne

Episode chronology
← Previous "Medallion"	Next → "Return"

"Valentine" is the 14th episode of the first season of the CW television series The Secret Circle, and the series' 14th episode overall. It was aired on February 9, 2012. The episode was written by Roger Grant and it was directed by Dave Barrett.

== Plot ==
It's Valentine's Day and Faye (Phoebe Tonkin) wants to throw an "Anti-Valentine's Day" party to honor the day, where only girls are allowed to attend. The girls are having fun but things get an unexpected turn when Melissa (Jessica Parker Kennedy) and Diana (Shelley Hennig) use the Devil's Spirit Mellisa took from Callum to get high. Faye tries to warn them that the Devil's Spirit is dangerous but they don't seem to listen to her.

Lee (Grey Damon) is back and wants to help Faye once again to get her powers back, using another kind of ritual this time. He gives her some kind wooden doll and tells her that she only has to put her under her bed. Faye trusts him and she does as he says but later we see that Lee is only using Faye's energy to help his girlfriend who's in coma.

In the meantime, Issac (JR Bourne) visits Jake (Chris Zylka) telling him that he wants to help them and he asks for Cassie's (Britt Robertson) medallion. Jake is telling him that the medallion is the only way to protect their Circle and it's what saved Cassie's father from the witch hunters. He refuses to help him get it and Isaac tells him that the medallion is not what they think. When Cassie starts seeing mysterious people following her, Jake goes back to Isaac to learn if those people are connected to the medallion.

Isaac informs Jake that those are the ghosts of dead witches that John Blackwell killed and stole their energy by confining it into the medallion. Since the medallion is activated, they feel it and they want to take their powers back. They won't stop till they manage it, even if that means they'll kill Cassie. Jake tries to find Cassie to warn her.

Cassie, while going to Adam's (Thomas Dekker), she is haunted once again by the spirits of the dead witches and her car crashes. She is getting out of the car and starts following the witches so she can find out what they want. In the meantime, Jake and Adam are searching for her and when they find her car they know she is in trouble.

All three of them end up in the church where Blackwell killed the witches. The witches get into Adam's body and demand from Cassie to give them the medallion otherwise they'll kill Adam. Jake is trying to convince her to not do it because the medallion contains the energy of a thousand witches and giving it to six will make them powerful and unbeatable. Cassie, not having another choice, she destroys the medallion and the witches disappear.

The episode ends with Cassie and Adam finally having their Valentine's date and a man with a mark on his hand getting into Chance Harbor, watching them from distance.

== Reception ==
=== Ratings ===
In its original American broadcast, "Valentine" was watched by 1.82 million; up 0.07 from the previous episode.

=== Reviews ===
"Valentine" received generally positive reviews.

Katherine Miller from The A.V. Club gave an A− rate to the episode saying that The Secret Circle killed an episode. "But I’m pretty sure that was very entertaining. It was even—unlike so many episodes of this show—sensible, logical (but not responsible or practical). Each plot happening informed the next, and thus we arrived at this: A funny, but legitimately suspenseful hour of television, as Cassie got a few steps closer to her father, Faye fell into a trap, and Diana had herself a good time."

Matt Richenthal from TV Fanatic rated the episode with 3.8/5 stating though that the show needs a "game-changer".

Sarah Maines from The TV Chick said that this episode was the first truly good one of the spring. "Secret Circle works best when it embraces it’s horror/thriller elements and tonight was a fine example of that! I fully admit to jumping out of my seat a few times when the ghosts were following Cassie throughout the episode."

== Feature music ==
In the episode "Valentine" we can hear the songs:

- "Car Song" by Spank Rock
- "Be A Body" by Grimes
- "Above All" by Razika
- "Feel So Close" by Calvin Harris
- "Swoon" by Big Deal

== Notes ==
- From this episode, Valentine, Chris Zylka stopped appearing as a guest on the series' credits but as a regular for the rest of the show.
