= Balcoin =

- The Secret Circle episode
- Charles (Gale Harold) trying to check up on Jane (Ashley Crow) after the spell he cast on her
- Episode no.: Season 1 Episode 9
- Directed by: Brad Turner
- Written by: Andrew Miller; Andrea Newman
- Production code: 2J6259
- Original air date: November 10, 2011

Guest appearances
- Chris Zylka; Arlen Escarpeta; JR Bourne

Episode chronology
← Previous "Beneath"	Next → "Darkness"

"Balcoin" is the 9th episode of the first season of the CW television series The Secret Circle, and the series' 9th episode overall. It was aired on November 10, 2011. The episode was written by Andrew Miller and Andrea Newman and it was directed by Brad Turner.

== Plot ==
Cassie (Britt Robertson) tries to figure out what the documents that Calvin left her mean. No one seems to be able to explain what the symbols on the documents are and her grandmother Jane (Ashley Crow) is unable to help since her memory is messed up after the spell Charles (Gale Harold) did on her. The only person who can help Cassie is Calvin himself but she cannot find him in his store (Jake killed him in the "Masked" episode).

While studying the documents with Jake (Chris Zylka), they find out that her Blackwell bloodline comes from the Balcoin bloodline. Cassie cannot understand what that means but it upsets Jake who leaves immediately to inform Isaac (JR Bourne) about it. Isaac says that they have to inform the council about it before they attempt to do anything else.

Charles is trying to check on Jane to see if the spell he did to her works, but he realizes that something is going really wrong when Jane confuses Cassie for Amelia. He informs Dawn (Natasha Henstridge) about it and Dawn does not miss the chance to accuse him for what is happening. She insists that Charles should give her the crystal but Charles once again refuses to do it. They decide to put their plans on hold for a while because the rest of the Elders will sure have their eyes on them after everything that has happened.

Meanwhile, Faye (Phoebe Tonkin) suspects that Jake is hiding things from them and she teams up with Adam (Thomas Dekker) to find out what Jake is up to. They are watching him during the Gala fundraiser and when Jake walks out to talk to Isaac, Adam sees him but he cannot hear what they are talking about. Isaac came to the fundraiser to let Jake know that the council decided not to kill Cassie for now but they should take her with them when they leave later during the night. Isaac asks Jake to bring her to the boat and Jake agrees.

Jake, instead of taking Cassie to the boat, takes her to his house and explains to her who her ancestors were, showing her what there is in his family's Book of Shadows. He tells her that she has dark magic inside her and asks her to go away with him because it is the only way to keep her friends and her family safe. While talking, Cassie receives a text message from Adam telling her that Jake is a witch hunter. Finding an excuse, she manages to get away from Jake but not from Isaac who drugs her and takes her to the boat.

Adam, who has already informed the Circle about Jake, tries to find Cassie with Faye. When he and Faye find Jake, Jake leads them to the boat and the three of them manage to take Cassie back.

The episode ends with Isaac saying to Jake that he has no idea what he just did because as he said: "Cassie Blake is not the only child of Blackwell in the Circle". Jake leaves with the witch hunters and while the boat is fending off, he stares at the members of the Circle while they are staring back at him.

== Reception ==
=== Ratings ===
In its original American broadcast, "Balcoin" was watched by 2.17 million; down 0.09 from the previous episode.

=== Reviews ===
"Balcoin" received generally positive reviews.

Katherine Miller from The A.V. Club gave a B− rate to the episode saying that the episode started with such a promise and it ended well enough. "So here, in this fall finale, looking at a show that's far, far better than it was in the pilot, a word of advice: Secret Circle, stick to your horror, your awkward reaction shots, and your ensemble scenes. You are so much better there."

Matt Richenthal from TV Fanatic rated the episode with 4/5 saying that he was hoping for more."To conclude its opening nine-episode run, The Secret Circle didn't leave viewers anxious with how a storyline would be resolved, it simply dropped a major plot point on us in order to set the stage for 2012."

Sarah Maines from The TV Chick said that the mid-season finale episode was solid and plain old awesome.

== Feature music ==
In the "Balcoin" episode we can hear the songs:

- "Forget It" by Blood Orange
- "Origins" by Tennis
- "Guilty As Charged" by Chairlift
- "Hard Times" by Widowspeak
- "Wait" by M83
- "Mars" by Natalie Walker

== Notes ==
- After the episode "Balcoin", the series took a long break for the holidays and the episode was defined as the mid-season finale. The next episode, "Darkness", was aired on January 5, 2012, almost two months later. Executive producer of the show, Andrew Miller, and actor Gale Harold (who portrays Charles Meade), gave an interview to the press right after the episode was aired to talk about it, what viewers can expect when the show comes back in January and other things related to the show.
- With the cliffhanger that there is a second Blackwell child in the Circle, the first thought of who that second child was, directed to Faye. The main reason was Jane's mention in the episode that Dawn had feelings about Blackwell sixteen years ago and there was something going on between them. Even having Faye as the first choice there were hopes that this was not going that way because it was to obvious. "...hopefully the show won’t drag that out [Faye being the second child], because the implication is pretty obvious." The mystery of who the second child was is revealed later on the show, at the end of the episode "Crystal" (episode 19).
