= Wake (The Secret Circle) =

- The Secret Circle episode
- Nick's (Louis Hunter) brother Jake (Chris Zylka) returns to Chance Harbor
- Episode no.: Season 1 Episode 6
- Directed by: Guy Bee
- Written by: Andrea Newman
- Production code: 2J6255
- Original air date: October 20, 2011

Guest appearances
- Chris Zylka; Adam Harrington; Luisa D'Oliveira; JR Bourne

Episode chronology
← Previous "Slither"	Next → "Masked"

"Wake" is the 6th episode of the first season of the CW television series The Secret Circle, and the series' 6th episode overall. It was aired on October 20, 2011. The episode was written by Andrea Newman and it was directed by Guy Bee.

== Plot ==
The episode starts with Cassie (Britt Robertson) seeing through her bedroom window a stranger at Nick's (Louis Hunter) backyard. From what it seems, he looks like he is putting a fire. When he tells her grandmother, Jane (Ashley Crow), Jane tells her that he must be Nick's older brother, Jake (Chris Zylka) who came back to town for Nick's funeral. Jane also informs Cassie that their Circle is not broken now that Nick is gone, but it is still bounded because when they bound it, they bound their bloodlines, not them, meaning that Jake is part of the Circle and its sixth member. Jane also tells Cassie that she was born to lead her Circle. Later, she gives Cassie the family crystal telling her though not to let anyone know that she has it.

Cassie informs the other members about what her grandmother told her about Jake but they are do not seem to trust him, especially Adam (Thomas Dekker) who has history with Jake. They decide not to tell Jake anything yet, since they do not even know if he is aware he is a witch. While they are discussing, someone puts a fire outside their shelter and they put it out with magic. When they do, they see that the person who put the fire marked the ground with a crescent moon symbol.

Cassie is going to her grandmother to ask her about the mark and if she knows something. She also tells her that she saw the same mark at Nick's backyard after Jake put out the fire the previous night. Jane informs Cassie that this mark is some kind of warning that was used to warn witches and to stay away from Jake till they know why he is back.

When Cassie gets back home, there is a woman (Luisa D'Oliveira) there, named Simone, who attacks her. Jake hears Cassie's screams and he is running to the house to help her. They do a spell together and the woman runs away. After that the Circle knows that Jake is aware about being a witch. He tells them he has no idea who that woman was but later we see him meeting her and asking her to give him the blood she took from Cassie. He then warns her to stay out of his way.

At Nick's wake, Simone comes back and Jake is trying to make her leave. She refuses to do it and they start fighting. Cassie who sees the whole scene, helps Jake by using the crystal Jane gave her earlier. Jake ends up killing Simone and then he tells Cassie that probably she is a witch from another Circle. Cassie is trying to convince Jake to stay in town and join them to complete the Circle.

Meanwhile, Adam's dad, Ethan (Adam Harrington), is having a conversation with Diana during the wake, telling her that Adam and Cassie are "written in the stars" and they are destined to be together. Diana after that, combined with Adam's behavior towards Cassie, she breaks up with him.

Jane meets Dawn (Natasha Henstridge) telling her that Nick's death was not an accident. Dawn believes that Jane knows what happened but when Jane tells her that Nick was killed by a demon and that the kids had bound their Circle she is relieved. Dawn then meets Charles (Gale Harold) to inform him that Jane has no idea about them but she knows about the kids. Charles though, after killing Nick, seems so lost and like he doesn't care about getting his powers back.

The episode ends with Jake meeting a group of people who turn out to be witch hunters and him working with them. Their leader, Isaac (JR Bourne) asks him why he killed Simone and Jake says he did not have a choice after Cassie saw him talking to her. Isaac says that they should not trust a witch killing other witches but Jake reassures him that he will do what he came for in town; revenge about his family's death by killing the ones who are responsible, meaning the members of the Circle.

== Reception ==
=== Ratings ===
In its original American broadcast, "Wake" was watched by 2.12 million; up 0.23 from the previous episode.

=== Reviews ===
"Wake" received mediocre reviews.

Katherine Miller from The A.V. Club gave a B− rate to the episode saying that Charle's guilt of killing Nick might be the path for everyone to discover about the murders that happened in the show so far. "After all, the two strongest non-horror scenes of the episode were probably Gale Harold's with his daughter and Dawn, respectively."

Matt Richenthal from TV Fanatic rated the episode with 3/5 saying that this episode was boring since it was difficult to follow two outstanding episodes. "Granted, "Wake" was faced with the challenging task of following a pair of outstanding, shocking, suspenseful episodes, but that doesn't change the irony of the episode title: I found it hard to stay awake."

Sarah Maines from The TV Chick said that with this episode didn't deliver an entertaining hour this week. "Overall, this was a flat, meandering episode, but the ending nicely set up some potential for the next few episodes. I have faith that Jake will improve subsequent episodes (and honestly, he really couldn't ever be as boring as Nick was). But for now, I'll leave you all with my weekly motto for Secret Circle: More Charles and Dawn, less of everyone else."

== Feature music ==
In the "Wake" episode we can hear the songs:

- "Go outside" by Cults
- "Still Life" by The Horrors
- "Cruel & Beautiful World" by GROUPLOVE
- "The Greatest Light Is The Greatest Shade" by The Joy Formidable
