= Slither (The Secret Circle) =

- The Secret Circle episode
- Charles (Gale Harold) and Dawn (Natasha Henstridge) trying to locate the other five crystals
- Episode no.: Season 1 Episode 5
- Directed by: Liz Friedlander
- Written by: Dana Baratta
- Production code: 2J6255
- Original air date: October 13, 2011

Episode chronology
← Previous "Heather"	Next → "Wake"

"Slither" is the 5th episode of the first season of the CW television series The Secret Circle, and the series' 5th episode overall. It was aired on October 13, 2011. The episode was written by Dana Baratta and it was directed by Liz Friedlander.

== Plot ==
Melissa (Jessica Parker Kennedy), after the demon got inside her body, is acting weird and no one can understand why while Cassie (Britt Robertson) is trying to keep the truth about her knowing being a witch from her grandmother, Jane (Ashley Crow). After Heather's death, Jane is suspicious and she is trying to make Cassie talk to her but Cassie is acting like everything is OK.

Possessed Melissa is tricking Nick (Louis Hunter) to help her dig up a suitcase from the woods by telling him that her family's Book of Shadows is in it. They take the suitcase to their shelter and Faye (Phoebe Tonkin) is getting there few minutes later and then Cassie. Melissa says that her mother spelled the suitcase and to open it, all six of them have to be there. While trying to call Adam (Thomas Dekker) and Diana (Shelley Hennig) to come, the three of them see the demon crawling under Melissa's skin and they realize that it's not her who wants to open the suitcase. Meanwhile, Adam and Diana are trying to make more time to spend together. After eating dinner together at Diana's house, they go to her bedroom and have a sexual moment together as Diana takes her dress off, leaving her half naked in a lace bra and underwear, much to Adam's delight. He pulls her down to the bed on top of him and makes out with her before turning her over on her back and kissing her up and down her body. Adam is visibly disappointed when their moment is cut short by Cassie texting them to come to the shelter. The moment they get there, Nick hits Melissa and they tie her up.

Dawn (Natasha Henstridge) and Charles (Gale Harold) are meeting at Charles' boat to perform a spell. They use the crystal they already have in their possession to locate the other five. They need six crystals so they'll be able to get their power back. The crystal though is not powerful enough and they can't complete the spell. Dawn blames Charles for that and she leaves saying that she shouldn't have trusted him.

Back in the shelter, the members of the circle realize that they don't know what to do with Melissa and Cassie leaves to call for help. She is going back home and tells Jane that she knows she is a witch and that they need her help. Jane goes with her and she manages to control the demon with her crystal so they can have time to prepare the spell to kill it. The moment Jane is ready to take the demon out of Melissa and kill it, she realizes that it's not in her anymore. She uses the crystal to find out that the demon got into Nick. Nick runs away and Jane with the rest of the Circle's members kill the demons that are in the suitcase.

Possessed Nick, after leaving the shelter, goes to the Boathouse and meets Dawn. He tells her that he is not Nick but the demon she summoned sixteen years ago, Abaddon, and he wants what he came for back then, the Circle and its power. Dawn manages to call Charles from her cell phone for help while she is getting Abaddon away from the Boathouse. Charles manages to knock Abaddon down and Dawn convinces Charles that the only way to kill him is by drοwning him. Charles, in his attempt to drown the demon, he kills Nick too, something that devastates him.

== Reception ==
=== Ratings ===
In its original American broadcast, "Slither" was watched by 1.89 million; down 0.07 from the previous episode.

=== Reviews ===
"Slither" received generally positive reviews.

Matt Richenthal from TV Fanatic rated the episode with 4.3/5 saying that this episode was creepy and surprising.

Sarah Maines from The TV Chick said that this episode was an A+ episode of The Secret Circle. "Overall, this was an A+ episode of Secret Circle. Edge of my seat, total emotional investment in all stories, and unexpected mind-bending twists. Here’s to hoping we see many more episodes like this one in the future!"

Katherine Miller from The A.V. Club gave a B+ rate to the episode saying that it was again creepy, frightening and good. "It was creepy again. It was kind of frightening again. It was good again. I even watched The Vampire Diaries beforehand and it didn’t utterly pale in comparison. Acceleration!"

== Feature music ==
In the "Slither" episode we can hear the songs:

- "Why Do I Worry?" by Lay Low
- "What the Water Gave me" by Florence and the Machine
- "You and I" by Washed Out
