= Darkness (The Secret Circle) =

- The Secret Circle episode
- Charles (Gale Harold) doesn't trust Dawn (Natasha Henstridge)
- Episode no.: Season 1 Episode 10
- Directed by: Chris Grismer
- Written by: David Ehrman
- Production code: 2J6260
- Original air date: January 5, 2012

Guest appearances
- Chris Zylka; Grey Damon; Stepfanie Kramer

Episode chronology
← Previous "Balcoin"	Next → "Fire/Ice"

"Darkness" is the 10th episode of the first season of the CW television series The Secret Circle, and the series' 10th episode overall. It was aired on January 5, 2012. The episode was written by David Ehrman and it was directed by Chris Grismer.

== Plot ==
The episode starts with Cassie (Britt Robertson) having a dream about her killing Jake (Chris Zylka) using her dark magic. After that dream, Cassie is trying to find out more about her ancestors and what dark magic means. She is asking Adam's (Thomas Dekker) help and she is asking him not to tell anyone about it yet. When Diana (Shelley Hennig) sees him searching on his computer about dark magic she figures out what is going on. Cassie, thinking that Adam told her secret to Diana, gets angry and tries to kill him but she stops in time.

Charles' (Gale Harold) mother, Kate (Stepfanie Kramer) comes in town surprising him and Diana. Kate pays Dawn (Natasha Henstridge) a visit, telling her that she knows that something is going on and she won't leave town until she figures out what she is up to. Dawn, after Kate's threat, meets Charles and she implies that they should kill her so she won't ruin their plans. Charles makes it clear that he won't kill his own mother and he will handle it.

Kate shows an unusual interest in Cassie when she learns that she's Amelia's daughter. She tells Cassie about the dark magic she has inside her and that she can help with it. She takes Cassie in the woods and she is casting a spell to destroy Cassie's black magic, but the only way to do that is by also killing her. Cassie manages to get herself free using her magic and Kate realizes that her power is much stronger than she thought.

Kate, after her failed attempt to kill Cassie, leaves town. Before she leaves, she admits to Charles that she tried to kill Cassie because it was the only way to find out how strong she was. When Charles says that he will let the other Elders know about what she did, she tells him that she knows he is involved on Henry's death and Jane's "neurological issue".

Meanwhile, Faye (Phoebe Tonkin) continues her attempts to get her individual magic back. She rips off a page from Cassie's book and she finds a guy, named Lee (Grey Damon), who's practicing magic asking him to help her. Melissa (Jessica Parker Kennedy) doesn't agree with what she is doing but there is no way to convince her to stop.

The episode ends with Cassie telling Diana what exactly happened in the woods and how she managed to save herself. Diana is asking Cassie: "Just how powerful are you?" but Cassie doesn't have an answer to that. Jake is also back in town.

== Reception ==
=== Ratings ===
In its original American broadcast, "Darkness" was watched by 2.05 million; down 0.12 from the previous episode.

=== Reviews ===
"Darkness" received mediocre reviews.

Katherine Miller from The A.V. Club gave a B rate to the episode.

Matt Richenthal from TV Fanatic rated the episode with 3.1/5 saying that the episode was rather bored and lacking action. "Overall, not a rousing return for The Secret Circle. Cassie's internal struggle has potential, but only in a larger context. I'd also love to see supporting characters developed more. Right now, Melissa only exists as Faye's BFF; Adam really just pines over Cassie; Diana doesn't do very much. Could you imagine an episode based around any of these witches? Me neither. We need to round out this circle."

Sarah Maines from The TV Chick said that the episode was overload with dark magic. "Like just about every episode of Secret Circle, “Darkness” had a few strong moments with hints of strong potential for the series but on a whole it failed to hit that special, adrenaline-filled viewing experience that The Vampire Diaries finds every week. Not to say this episode wasn't good, it just wasn't great."

== Feature music ==
In the "Darkness" episode we can hear the songs:

- "Sweet Dreams" by The Grates
- "Black Water" by Apparat
