= Masked (The Secret Circle) =

- The Secret Circle episode
- Faye (Phoebe Tonkin) and Cassie (Britt Robertson in their Halloween costumes
- Episode no.: Season 1 Episode 7
- Directed by: Charles Beeson
- Written by: Michelle Lovretta
- Production code: 2J6257
- Original air date: October 27, 2011

Guest appearances
- Chris Zylka; Adam Harrington; Tom Butler; Zachary Abel; Hiro Kanagawa; JR Bourne

Episode chronology
| ← Previous "Wake" | Next → "Beneath" |

"Masked" is the 7th episode of the first season of the CW television series The Secret Circle, and the series' 7th episode overall. It was aired on October 27, 2011. The episode was written by Michelle Lovretta and it was directed by Charles Beeson.

== Plot ==
Cassie (Britt Robertson) is throwing a party for Halloween while her grandmother, Jane (Ashley Crow) is leaving to go to Henry's (Tom Butler) place, Faye's (Phoebe Tonkin) grandfather. She didn't hear from him for weeks and she is worried.

Cassie and Faye are buying some decorations for the party from an old antique store and when the owner, Calvin (Hiro Kanagawa), sees Cassie's last name asks if she is related to Amelia Blake. Cassie finds out later from Jane that Calvin is also a witch but from another Circle. Before leaving the store, Faye convinces Cassie to invite Luke (Zachary Abel) to the party as her date.

Later at Cassie's house, while making the set up for the party, Cassie finds a piece of the knife the witch had attacked her with in the previous episode. There are some strange symbols on it but they don't know what they mean, so Cassie decides to go back to the antique store to ask Calvin about them. On her way there, she meets Jake (Chris Zylka) outside her home and tells him about the knife. Jake immediately leaves to go to the store before Cassie and warns Calvin by threatening him, to not answer any questions Cassie will ask him.

Cassie gets to the store and Calvin doesn't tell her anything. She sees though that there is an item in the store with exactly the same symbols - plus a new one - on it as the knife she has. She takes a picture of it and goes back to the shelter where she is searching to find out what these symbols mean along with Adam (Thomas Dekker). They discover that the symbols are related to witch hunters. While trying to tell Jake about it, he says something that makes Cassie suspicious. She asks Faye to occupy him during the party so she can search his house.

Jake has a meeting with Isaac (JR Bourne) where he spells the five vessels (one for each member of the Circle) that will allow Isaac to kill the five witches. Isaac informs him that he won't be alone at the party. Some "brothers" will be there to drug and take the witches, one of which is Luke, who seems to be from a witch hunter family.

Meanwhile, Calvin wants to warn Cassie about the magic she has inside her and about her father, John Blackwell. John seemed to be using dark magic and he is somehow connected to what happened sixteen years ago. He leaves an envelope at Cassie's home and he calls her but he doesn't get the chance to tell her anything because Jake kills him.

During the party, Cassie finds a knife in Jake's room with the witch hunter symbols on it. Jake finds her there and when she asks him why he has a witch hunter knife, he says that it was Nick's. He shows her more things that Nick "had" saying that he doesn't know what Nick was doing. Meanwhile, the witch hunters are drugging all the members of the Circle one by one and taking them to a house at the deck.

With all five members tied up in a circle that's not allowing them to do any magic, Luke tries to kill each of them using the vessels Jake spelled earlier. Cassie manages somehow to use magic saving everyone and killing Luke. In the meantime, Jake comes at the deck house trying to warn Isaac to stop because Cassie has dark magic and they can't kill her that way.

The members of the Circle get free and find Jake outside the house hurt. He supposedly fought a witch hunter trying to get to them, but the Circle is still suspicious about him and they don't seem to trust him.

The episode ends with Cassie finding the envelope Calvin left for her, which contains some strange ancient documents with the initials J.B. on them and Jane arriving at Henry's house. She finds him lying on the floor and in her attempt to help him, she gets Henry's crystal and tries to do a spell, but someone hits her on the head, takes the crystal and leaves.

== Reception ==
=== Ratings ===
In its original American broadcast, "Masked" was watched by 2.33 million; up 0.21 from the previous episode.

=== Reviews ===
"Masked" received positive reviews.

Katherine Miller from The A.V. Club gave a B+ rate to the episode. "The Secret Circle’s Halloween, however, also got to be about the tension between who we inescapably are, who we want to be, and who we can pretend to be. Is Cassie Blake going to turn out like her mother, the ol’ beloved Amelia, or will she take after her black magic father? Is Jake an irredeemable psychopath or just waiting to be turned into a hero? The endgame answers seem a little obvious, but the show's treating them like legitimate questions. That's why tonight, the Secret Circle wove together some underlying, relatable questions with good suspense and ever more mystery for the best episode yet."

Matt Richenthal from TV Fanatic rated the episode with 4.4/5 saying that it was a great episode overall. "This was a great episode overall, perfectly utilizing the theme of generation versus generation. It's my favorite aspect of The Secret Circle, allowing for both mystery and character development."

Sarah Maines from The TV Chick said that this week's episode didn't disappoint and it was a solid follow-up from the previous one. "Overall, this was a solid follow-up to last week’s episode and a much better introduction to Jake. A couple of really strong twists (and really fun Halloween costumes) made this a great episode. And as always, let’s finish this up with my weekly motto: More Charles and Dawn."

== Feature music ==
In the "Masked" episode we can hear the songs:

- "Just A Little Bit" by Kids Of 88
- "Book Of Revelations" by The Drums
- "Ready 2 Go" by Martin Solveig and Kele
