= Heather (The Secret Circle) =

- The Secret Circle episode
- Cassie (Britt Robertson) showing Adam (Thomas Dekker her Book of Shadows
- Episode no.: Season 1 Episode 4
- Directed by: Dave Barrett
- Written by: David Ehrman
- Production code: 2J6254
- Original air date: October 6, 2011

Guest appearances
- Ben Cotton; Camille Sullivan

Episode chronology
← Previous "Loner"	Next → "Slither"

"Heather" is the 4th episode of the first season of the CW television series The Secret Circle, and the series' 4th episode overall. It was aired on October 6, 2011. The episode was written by David Ehrman and it was directed by Dave Barrett.

== Plot ==
The Circle is trying to discover what happened to Heather Barnes, the woman Zachary mentioned in the previous episode and what he meant. While searching about her, they find out where his brother, Wade (Ben Cotton), lives and Cassie (Britt Robertson) and Adam (Thomas Dekker) go there to ask him about her.

When they get there, they discover that Heather (Camille Sullivan) is in a catatonic state since the night of the fire on the boat, sixteen years ago. Wade tells them that she hadn't moved at all since then and the moment he says that, Heather grabs Cassie's arm. While being there, they see a witchcraft mark on Heather's arm.

Cassie doesn't know what is going on and she can't understand why her mother would do something like that to her friend. Feeling guilty for what her mother did, she wants to help Heather by undoing the spell. Adam agrees to help her, after Cassie is telling him that she found her mom's Book of Shadows and there is a spell they can use.

Adam calls Diana (Shelley Hennig) and informs her what they want to do. When Diana gets there, she is telling them that it's not a good idea to undo the spell, since they don't know why Amelia did it in the first place and because they also don't know how to do it. She stops them and Adam is leaving with her.

Faye (Phoebe Tonkin) is getting there later, finding Cassie alone. When Cassie tells her what's going on and what she wants to do, Faye offers to help her. They go together back to Wade's house and they undo the spell, but nothing seems to happen.

They leave the house but when Wade is back, Heather wakes up, knocks him down and leaves. She is getting to Cassie's house, looking for Amelia to help her but she only finds Cassie. Heather tries to explain her about demons but while she is doing it, demons take control of her and she is attacking Cassie and later Faye who's upstairs.

Meanwhile, Diana is showing Adam what she found in her Book of Shadows about Heather's mark and that it's connected with demons and black magic. They try to call Cassie to let her know so she won't attempt to undo the spell but it's too late.

Nick (Louis Hunter) and Melissa (Jessica Parker Kennedy), who are at Nick's room, see from the window that Cassie and Faye are in danger and they get there to help them. Nick manages to fights back the possessed Heather. Heather is running into the street and gets hit by a car.

All these leave the members of the Circle with more questions of what happened sixteen years ago on that boat and how their parents died and an unleashed demon that (in the form of a black snake) gets out of Heather's dead body and gets into Melissa's at the end of the episode.

== Reception ==
=== Ratings ===
In its original American broadcast, "Heather" was watched by 1.96 million; down 0.16 from the previous episode.

=== Reviews ===
"Heather" received generally positive reviews.

Jim Garner from TV Fanatic rated the episode with 4.3/5 saying that this episode was as action-packed/fast-paced as The Vampire Diaries show.

Sarah Maines from The TV Chick said that with this episode the show had overcome the hurdle of starting being good and that the episode was awesome and also terrifying. "Aside from the snake demon and the nightmares I’m definitely going to have about it tonight, this was the first truly great episode of Secret Circle. I can’t wait to tune in next week and find out how the circle deals with Melissa’s possession!"

Katherine Miller from The A.V. Club gave a B+ rate to the episode saying that we had seen creepiness on the episode and she liked it. "Now there’s the team behind The Vampire Diaries we all know and love. The Secret Circle nixed the parents, the school, and Cassie’s unyielding obstinacy, threw in some danger and some tiny, tiny demon snakes, and boom, things got good."

== Feature music ==
In the "Heather" episode we can hear the songs:

- "Stare Into The Sun" by Graffiti6
- "All of This" by The Naked and Famous
- "No Sacrifice" by Uh Huh Her
- "Give you More" by Taxi Girl
- "Coming Down" by Dum Dum Girls
