= Beneath (The Secret Circle) =

- The Secret Circle episode
- Cassie (Britt Robertson) and Jake (Chris Zylka) share a kiss while playing "Truth or Dare"
- Episode no.: Season 1 Episode 8
- Directed by: John Fawcett
- Written by: Don Whitehead; Holly Henderson
- Production code: 2J6258
- Original air date: November 3, 2011

Guest appearances
- Chris Zylka; Tom Butler; JR Bourne

Episode chronology
← Previous "Masked"	Next → "Balcoin"

"Beneath" is the 8th episode of the first season of the CW television series The Secret Circle, and the series' 8th episode overall. It was aired on November 3, 2011. The episode was written by Don Whitehead and Holly Henderson, and it was directed by John Fawcett.

== Plot ==
Cassie (Britt Robertson) didn't hear from Jane (Ashley Crow) for a few days and she is really worried about her that she decides to go to Henry's (Tom Butler) house and look for her. The whole Circle, including Jake (Chris Zylka), is leaving for Henry's but a storm makes the day trip to become an overnight one.

Dawn (Natasha Henstridge) is worried that Faye (Phoebe Tonkin) is going to be the one who will find her grandfather's body but Charles (Gale Harold) reassures her that the kids won't find the body because he removed it. It's revealed that Charles was the one who hit Jane in the head and now he is taking her back to Chance Harbor unconscious. He also has the crystal Jane had to save Henry.

When he gets back home, he and Dawn are trying to find a spell that will interact with Jane's memory so she won't remember what happened at Henry's. When Dawn sees that Charles has a new crystal, she is trying to manipulate him to give it to her but after what happened with Nick, Charles seems not willing to let her in charge again. He is also the one who makes the spell on Jane.

Meanwhile, the kids arrive at Henry's house and they don't find him there. They are trying to pass their time playing "Truth or Dare" while Faye is having some visions of a little girl since the moment they got there. During the game she has a conflict with Cassie and she leaves the house. While she is getting ready to leave with her car, she sees the little girl again and this time she is following her to see what she wants.

A little bit later, Cassie finds Faye's car with its door open and her things there, but she can't see Faye. She instead sees the little girl and follows her. The little girl leads her to Faye who's upset because she recognized the little girl as herself when she was six years old. She remembers that day when she was at her grandfather's house and how her grandfather saved her life. She feels like the girl is there for a reason and she is following her again to the lake.

Cassie is trying to take Faye back home but she is screaming that the little girl fell into the water and they have to help her. Adam (Thomas Dekker), Diana (Shelley Hennig) and Jake hear her screams and come to the lake. While Adam and Jake try to pull Faye out of the water, Cassie sees again the little girl at the edge of the deck. She gets there and with magic she manages to emerge Henry's body from the water.

Dawn gets there to take Faye and everyone is going back to Chance Harbor. On their way back, Jake reveals to Cassie that it was Henry's energy who led them to his body using Faye's memories and that Cassie getting into her memories is not something that everyone can do. He is telling her that she is more powerful than she thinks. Jake also informs Isaac (JR Bourne), who's waiting for him back home, about Cassie's power and that they have to wait to find the right way to kill her because of that power.

The episode ends with Cassie talking to her grandmother about Henry and Jane saying that she never managed to get into the house since Henry was not there. The only problem is that Cassie found Jane's scarf inside the house. They both find that strange but Jane doesn't remember what happened.

== Reception ==
=== Ratings ===
In its original American broadcast, "Beneath" was watched by 2.26 million; down 0.07 from the previous episode.

=== Reviews ===
"Beneath" received generally positive reviews.

Katherine Miller from The A.V. Club gave an A− rate to the episode saying that this was the best episode of the season. "The mysteries here, the commitment to horror, and the liveliness of the circle itself keep making Secret Circle better, and I like it more each week."

Carla Day from TV Fanatic rated the episode with 4.5/5 saying that Chance Harbor is a scary place to live at the moment. "Chance Harbor is a scary place to live right now. Death is all around. With one Elder gone and another under a spell, who will protect the circle? Are Charles and Dawn up to the task, or are they consumed with their quest for power that they won't be able to help their children?"

Tyler Olson from Crimson Tear said that overall the episode was really entertaining.

== Feature music ==
In the "Beneath" episode we can hear the songs:

- "Long Way" by Papercranes
- "Wildfire" by SBTRKT
- "What It's Worth" by The Engineers
