= Beneath =

Beneath may refer to:

== Film and television ==
- Beneath (2007 film), an American thriller directed by Dagen Merrill
- Beneath (2013 film), an American horror film directed by Larry Fessenden
- Beneath, a 2013 film directed by Ben Ketai
- "Beneath" (The Secret Circle), a 2011 TV episode
- "Beneath" (Young Justice), a 2012 TV episode

== Music ==
- Beneath (Amoral album) or the title song, 2011
- Beneath (Infant Island album), 2020
- Beneath, an album by Crocodile Shop, 1996
- "Beneath", a song by Ride, a B-side of the single "Vapour Trail", 1991

== Other uses ==
- Beneath (video game), a cancelled game developed by Presto Studios
- Beneath (patience term), a term used in card solitaire games
