= Lauren Stamile =

American actress (born 1976)

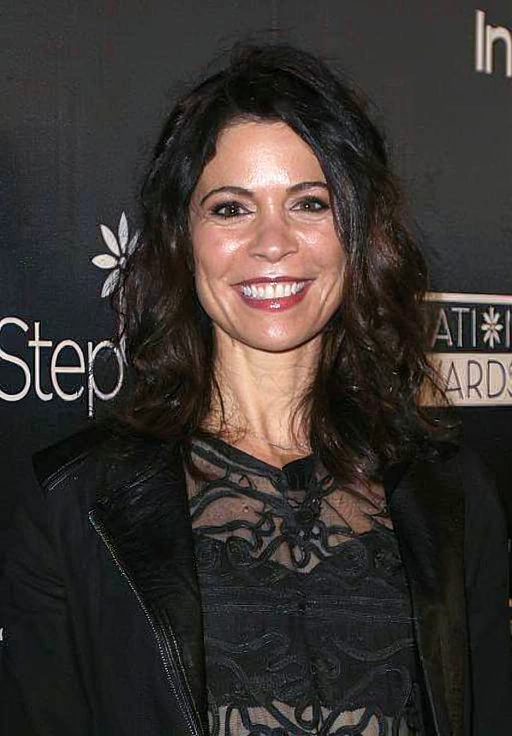
- Stamile in 2015
- Born: September 12, 1976 (age 50); Tulsa, Oklahoma, United States
- Occupation: Actress
- Years active: 1999–present
- Spouse: Randy Zamcheck (m. 2009)
- Children: 2

Lauren Stamile (born September 12, 1976) is an American actress. She is best known for portraying Nurse Rose on the ABC series Grey's Anatomy, Michelle Slater on the NBC series Community, and CIA Agent Dani Pearce on the USA Network series Burn Notice.

== Early life ==
Stamile was born in Tulsa, Oklahoma, the third of five siblings. She is of Italian descent. During her teenage years, she worked in restaurants. She graduated from Cascia Hall Preparatory School. Her father is a physician and her mother is a nurse. She majored in theater at Northwestern University in Evanston, Illinois, and then moved to New York City, New York to pursue an acting career.

== Career ==
Stamile has appeared in commercials for Old Spice, JC Penney, Summer's Eve, Tassimo, and Volkswagen. She appeared in a 2000 episode of The Drew Carey Show, then co-starred in the WB sitcom Off Centre. After that show's cancellation, she had a series of guest roles in television shows such as Drop Dead Diva, Without a Trace, CSI: Miami, Cold Case, Boston Legal, Community, Grey's Anatomy, The Good Guys, Crossing Jordan, Tru Calling, The West Wing, Summerland, and Scrubs. She also starred in the 2009 film Midnight Bayou. Stamile joined the cast of Burn Notice for the fifth and sixth seasons. Her stage credits include The Miser, Murder on the Nile, Lion in Winter, and Lounge Act.

== Personal life ==
Stamile married writer Randy Zamcheck in April 2009.

== Filmography ==
=== Film ===
Year	Title	Role	Notes
2000	Something Sweet	Mel	
2000	Follow Me Outside	Georgette	
2004	The Last Letter	Ms. Paige	
2008	Kissing Cousins	Liza	
2009	The Blue Tooth Virgin	Rebecca	
2011	Low Fidelity	Ann	
2012	Overnight	Abby	
2015	Tooken	Lenore Millers	
2019	Bit	Jenni	
2021	Let Us In	Michelle	
2022	The Storied Life of A.J. Fikry	Leonora	

=== Television ===
Year	Title	Role	Notes
1999	Law & Order: Special Victims Unit	Sarah	Episode: "Sophomore Jinx"
2001	The Drew Carey Show	Julie Baker	Episode: "Drew and the Motorcycle"
2001–2002	Off Centre	Liz Limbardi	Main role; 29 episodes
2003	Without a Trace	Jessica	Episode: "There Goes the Bride"
2003	CSI: Miami	Marie Heitzenrader	Episode: "Spring Break"
2003	Strong Medicine	Marcie	Episode: "Skin"
2003	The West Wing	C.J.'s Aide	Episode: "Disaster Relief"
2004	Married to the Kellys	Jill	Episode: "Double Dating"
2004	Behind the Camera: The Unauthorized Story of Charlie's Angels	Kate Jackson	Television movie
2004	Cold Case	Abbey Lake (1992)	Episode: "Late Returns"
2004	Tru Calling	Emma	Episode: "Two Weddings and a Funeral"
2004	Summerland	Lauren Cooper	Episode: "Into My Life"
2004	Girlfriends	Anya	Episode: "L.A. Bound"
2005	Committed	Natalie	Episode: "The Perfect Person: Parts 1 & 2"
2005	Crossing Jordan	Sarah Soble	Episode: "Forget Me Not"
2005	Close to Home	Karla Miller	Episode: "Parents on Trial"
2005	Kitchen Confidential	Julia	Episode: "Rabbit Test"
2006	That Guy	Cassidy	Television movie
2006	Boston Legal	Audrey Puiezzy	Episode: "Ivan the Incorrigible"
2006	Numb3rs	Kelly Johnston	Episode: "Hardball"
2006	Criminal Minds	DEA Agt. Bonnie Ryan	Episode: "Lessons Learned"
2007	Rules of Engagement	Karen	Episode: "Pilot"
2007	Heroes	Ms. Gerber	Episode: "Four Months Later..."
2007	CSI: NY	Amber Stanton	Episode: "Commuted Sentences"
2007	Scrubs	Shannon	Episode: "My Number One Doctor"
2007–2008	Grey's Anatomy	Nurse Rose	Recurring role; 12 episodes
2009	Midnight Bayou	Lena Simone	Television movie
2009	Alligator Point	Emma Lawson, M.D.	Television movie
2009–2010	Community	Prof. Michelle Slater	Recurring (season 1); 5 episodes
2010	The Good Guys	Kiersten	Episode: "Bait & Switch"
2010	Drop Dead Diva	Charlotte Perkins	Episode: "Last Year's Model"
2010	The Event	Molly Dixon	Episode: "I Haven't Told You Everything"
2011	Untitled Allan Loeb Project	Amy Cheever	Unsold TV pilot
2011–2012	Burn Notice	Agent Pearce	Recurring role; 14 episodes
2012	The Secret Circle	Lucy Gibbons	Episode: "Medallion"
2013	The Mentalist	Madison Yardley	Episode: "The Desert Rose"
2013–2014	Scandal	Carla	3 episodes
2014	CSI: Crime Scene Investigation	Dr. Heather Lanning	Episode: "Bad Blood"
2015	Workaholics	Lydia	Episode: "TAC in the Day"
2015	Complications	Bridget O'Neill	Main role; 10 episodes
2015	CSI: Cyber	Dr. Colleen Marks	Episode: "Hack E.R."
2015	Major Crimes	Molly Pace	Episode: "Four of a Kind"
2016	Chicago Fire	Susan Weller	5 episodes
2017	NCIS	Michelle Lane	Episode: "Exit Strategy"
2018	Blindspot	Millicent Van Der Waal	2 episodes
2018	American Horror Story: Apocalypse	Wife	Episode: "Traitor"
2019	The Rookie	Agent Phoenix Danvers	Episode: "Redwood"
2019	Good Girls	Gretchen Zorada	Season 2, Episode: 3
2019	9-1-1	Ellie Costas	2 episodes
2019	Veronica Mars	Renee	Episode: "Chino and the Man"
2020	Rita	Anya	Television movie
2022	S.W.A.T.	Inspector Gen. Mary Jones	Episode: "Maniak"
2023	Gotham Knights	Dr. Rebekah Leviticus / Rebecca March	Recurring role
