= The Secret Circle (TV series) =

2011 American supernatural television drama series

- Genre: Supernatural; Fantasy; Teen drama; Horror
- Based on: The Secret Circle by L. J. Smith
- Developed by: Andrew Miller
- Starring: Britt Robertson; Thomas Dekker; Gale Harold; Phoebe Tonkin; Shelley Hennig; Jessica Parker Kennedy; Ashley Crow; Louis Hunter; Natasha Henstridge; Chris Zylka
- Country of origin: United States
- Original language: English
- No. of seasons: 1
- No. of episodes: 22

Production
- Executive producers: Kevin Williamson; Andrew Miller; Richard Hatem; Leslie Morgenstein; Gina Girolamo
- Producer: Liz Friedlander
- Production locations: Vancouver, British Columbia, Canada
- Running time: 42 minutes
- Production companies: Outerbanks Entertainment; Alloy Entertainment; CBS Television Studios; Bonanza Productions; Warner Bros. Television

Original release
- Network: The CW
- Release: September 15, 2011 – May 10, 2012

The Secret Circle is an American supernatural fantasy teen drama television series that aired on the CW from September 15, 2011, to May 10, 2012. It is based on the book series of the same name written by L. J. Smith. Set in the fictional town of Chance Harbor, Washington, the series focuses on Cassie Blake who, after moving to the town, discovers that she is a hereditary witch and becomes the sixth member of a secret coven. The series was developed by Andrew Miller and was picked up by the CW on May 17, 2011. On October 12, the CW ordered a full 22-episode season.

The CW canceled the series on May 11, 2012. Ratings had declined in the second half of the season; the high costs of special effects and location shooting were also cited as reasons for the cancellation.

== Synopsis ==
Following her mother's death in a tragic fire, orphaned highschooler Cassie Blake (Britt Robertson) moves to Chance Harbor, Washington, to live with her grandmother. Her plans to adjust to her new life are made more complicated when five of her classmates—Adam Conant (Thomas Dekker), Diana Meade (Shelley Hennig), Faye Chamberlain (Phoebe Tonkin), Melissa Glaser (Jessica Parker Kennedy), and Nick Armstrong (Louis Hunter)—recognize her as a witch and invite her to join their coven, the Circle. With her, they can unlock the full extent of their powers. Initially, Cassie refuses to believe that she is a witch, even after Adam helps her to unlock her powers. It is only after she discovers an old leather-bound book of spells left to her by her late mother, Amelia, that she begins to accept her power. Inside the book is a message from Amelia explaining that she kept secret their real family history and her powers in order to keep Cassie safe. As the Circle soon finds out, the witches' powers attract dark and dangerous forces that constantly put them in harm's way.

== Main cast ==
=== Circle members ===
- Britt Robertson as Cassie Blake, a newly-revealed witch who moved to Chance Harbor after the death of her mother, Amelia. Initially disliking the idea of being a witch, she soon begins to accept her destiny and her family's magical heritage. Her mother's line goes back to the beginning of witchcraft, while her father, John Blackwell, comes from a similarly long line of dark witches. Through Blackwell, she is Diana's elder half-sister.
- Thomas Dekker as Adam Conant, a natural-born witch and one of the two male members of the Circle. He and Cassie are instantly attracted to each other, which puts a strain on Adam's longstanding relationship with Diana. It is Adam who helps Cassie unlock her powers and encourages her to join the Circle.
- Phoebe Tonkin as Faye Chamberlain, an eccentric and free-spirited witch who uses her powers recklessly and selfishly. Frequently brash and irresponsible, she often challenges authority. In particular, she resents Diana's presumption of being Circle leader, and is jealous that Diana found her family's Book of Shadows before she has found hers. She is best friends with Melissa.
- Shelley Hennig as Diana Meade, the responsible but sometimes bossy leader of the Circle. She becomes good friends with Cassie, despite the attraction between Cassie and Diana's long-term boyfriend, Adam Conant. She was the first member of the Circle to discover witchcraft and—before Cassie found hers—the only member to have found her family's Book of Shadows. She is Cassie's younger half-sister through their father, John Blackwell. She has dark magic and Balcoin blood.
- Jessica Parker Kennedy as Melissa Glaser, the fourth female witch of the Circle. She is Faye's closest friend and Nick's girlfriend. Compared to her coven-mates, she is quieter and tends to keep her opinions to herself, but she is responsible and loyal to the Circle.
- Louis Hunter as Nick Armstrong, the second male member of the Circle. He and Melissa are in a relationship that he is reluctant to make anything more than sexual. After a warning from Faye, he begins to treat Melissa with more respect and their relationship improves. Early on in the series he is possessed by a demon and is then drowned by Charles Meade and Dawn Chamberlain in an attempt to kill the demon. He is resurrected by the witch hunters later in an attempt to steal the family crystals but eventually dies again.

=== Others ===
- Gale Harold as Charles Meade, Diana's father and a member of the previous generation of the Circle. Following the fire at the boat yard, his powers—along with those of the surviving members of his Circle—were stripped from him. It is he who in episode 1 kills Cassie's mother, using the magical power of a crystal so that she will return to Chance Harbor and join the circle. He then later drowns Nick Armstrong to kill the demon that was possessing him. Nick's death affects him heavily after this.
- Ashley Crow as Jane Blake, Cassie's grandmother and Amelia's mother. She initially seems ignorant of witchcraft and the Circle, but Cassie eventually takes the hint and begins regularly seeking her advice.
- Natasha Henstridge as Dawn Chamberlain, is Faye's mother, the principal of Chance Harbor High School and a member of the previous generation of the Circle. She and Charles act as a team, although she is the more sadistic of the two. She prefers, however, to let Charles do the dirty work, such as Amelia's murder.
- Chris Zylka as Jake Armstrong, Nick's elder brother, who returns to the town after Nick's death. By the rules of coven magic, he inherits Nick's place in the coven (which thus remains bound). Believing witchcraft responsible for the death of his parents, he initially works for a group of witch hunters. However, he eventually finds out that it was the witch hunters who killed his parents. He shows an interest in Cassie, but he and Faye establish a relationship which is maintained through the remainder of the series.

=== Recurring cast ===
- Logan Browning as Sally Matthews, a girl who befriends Cassie. She butts heads with Faye, who accidentally kills her when her power is unexpectedly strong. Dawn manages to revive her with a crystal, leaving her with a broken arm. She then becomes suspicious of the Circle members, especially after they left the hallway a mess from using their powers, but still tries to be friends with Cassie. She last appears in episode 3 ("Loner").
- Zachary Abel as Luke, a friend of Adam's who is attracted to Cassie when she first arrives. Through Adam, he asks her to the school dance, but amicably accepts her decision when she ditches him. In episode 7 ("Masked"), he is asked to attend a Halloween party at Cassie's house, organized by Faye, and is revealed to be a witch hunter.
- Adam Harrington as Ethan Conant, Adam's father. An alcoholic, he owns the Boathouse Bar and Grill where Adam works. Like Charles and Dawn, he was stripped of his powers sixteen years prior to the series' beginning. He continually complains about how he never was with Amelia, despite their relationship being "written in the stars", and misses her more than he misses Adam's mother. Eventually, he tells Diana that Adam is destined to be with Cassie, causing their breakup. Later he stops drinking, realizing he needs to be a better father. He has a rivalry with Charles, mentioning multiple times that he has always been a bully. He also hates John Blackwell, at one point trying to kill him. He last appears in episode 16 ("Lucky").
- Emily Holmes as Amelia Blake, Cassie's mother (in her first appearance). She is killed by Charles in episode 1 in order to bring Cassie back to Chance Harbor.
- Andrea Brooks as Amelia Blake (in her second appearance). She is mentioned throughout the series. She was a member of the previous generation of the Circle, and was John Blackwell's girlfriend: she let him into the Circle, but left him once she realized who he was. She stopped the demons Blackwell summoned at the boatyard fire, and was stripped of her powers along with Charles, Dawn, and Ethan. In a flashback, it is revealed that she knew Blackwell was also Diana's father.
- JR Bourne as Isaac, a high-ranking member of the witch hunters. Jake reports to him regularly: even after leaving the witch hunters, Jake still seems to have some respect for him. He arrives in Chance Harbor in episode 6 ("Wake") and leaves in episode 9 ("Balcoin"); he later returns, however, to get Balcoin's medallion from Jake, showing that, at least to some extent, he reciprocates Jake's respect. His faction of the witch hunters is called the "True Believers".
- Richard Harmon as Ian, a witch hunter. He first appears in episode 7 ("Masked"), trying to kill the Circle. He reappears in episode 20 ("Traitor"), having returned to Chance Harbor in Isaac's place (although only out of respect for Isaac) to warn the Circle about a witch who has given power to the witch hunters.
- Sammi Rotibi as Eben, the leader of the witch hunters who will do anything to kill witches, especially John Blackwell. Sixteen years prior to the events of the series, he used Ethan Conant's power to try to kill Blackwell, but failed. That day he personally killed Jake and Nick's parents. When Blackwell returns, Eben summons demons into himself to protect him and to aid him in killing witches, causing a rift with Isaac and other witch hunters.
- Nina Kiri as Lucy Gibbons (in her first appearance), John Blackwell's psychic sixteen years ago, who was at the boatyard on the night of the fire. She seeks Cassie out to warn her about the witch hunters.
- Lauren Stamile as Lucy Gibbons (in her second appearance). She is revealed to be working for the witch hunters, just as she had been sixteen years ago.
- Tom Butler as Henry Chamberlain, Dawn's father-in-law, Faye's grandfather, and an elder. He comes to Chance Harbor after being called by Ethan Conant, to determine whether or not the next generation is practicing. Dawn kills him after he says he will alert the elders. Charles then hides his body at his house, twice, but it is eventually found.
- Stepfanie Kramer as Kate Meade, Charles' mother, Diana's grandmother, and an elder. She becomes suspicious when Diana tells her Charles and Dawn are dating, and confronts Dawn. Dawn later puts on a facade, possibly attempting to poison her, causing a rift with Charles. She tries to kill Cassie to destroy her dark magic but fails, and informs Charles that she knows what he has done. She returns in episode 22 ("Family"), to gift her power to Charles and Dawn to save the children.
- Hiro Kanagawa as Calvin Wilson, the owner of Chance Harbor's antique store and a witch from another Circle. He realizes Cassie has dark magic and tries to warn her, but is stopped by Jake. He later appears as a hallucination to Jake when he is sick.
- Joe Lando as John Blackwell, Cassie's father, and a witch with dark magic. He returns to Chance Harbor after Cassie uses his medallion to contact him. He is revealed to be Diana's biological father, from an affair when Charles and his wife were separated. His intentions remain unclear until the final episodes. It is revealed that he fathered Cassie and Diana, and caused the Circle's female members to become pregnant by their boyfriends and then go to the boatyard—which he knew was a trap—in order to make their children orphans whom he could manipulate to form his own circle of dark magic. He also had an affair and planned to have a child with Dawn, but was thwarted because she was already pregnant with Faye. His plans are ultimately stopped by Cassie and Diana.
- Grey Damon as Lee LaBeque, a practitioner of voodoo magic. Faye tracks him down in an attempt to get her solo magic back. He does some things, but they all have consequences Faye dislikes, and she believes he is using her. In fact, he is using her magic to revive his girlfriend who is in a coma. Nevertheless, he and Faye develop feelings for one another.
- Alexia Fast as Eva, Lee's girlfriend, who is in a coma. She later awakens and gains some of Faye's power due to Lee's voodoo magic.
- Michael Graziadei as Callum, a friend of Lee's and a drug dealer who sells Devil's Spirit. He realizes that Faye and Melissa are witches after a party and an argument with Lee. In episode 19 ("Crystal"), he attempts to steal one of the crystals, but the Circle stops him and "marks" him, ordering him to never return to Chance Harbor.
- Tim Phillipps as Grant, an Australian who comes to Chance Harbor by boat. He and Diana instantly develop a mutual attraction, but problems arise because he has lied to her about owning the boat (he just works on it), and because she is a witch. He offers to take her with him, away from Chance Harbor.

=== Guest cast ===
- Dave Baez as Zachary Larson, a former friend of Amelia's who knew about the Circle. After the fire at the boat yard, he blamed Amelia and the Circle for what happened to his girlfriend, Heather. He became a fisherman, and returns to Chance Harbor occasionally. After discovering that Cassie has returned to town, he attempts to stop the Circle by killing one of its members. The Circle defeats him, and Charles and Dawn then "mark" him, forcing him to stay away from the children.
- Camille Sullivan as Heather Barnes, a former friend of Amelia's and Zachary's ex-girlfriend. At the boatyard she was possessed by a demon, and Amelia paralyzed her to prevent it from causing harm. Cassie and Faye try to help her, without fully understanding the situation.
- Ben Cotton as Wade Barnes, Heather's brother, who takes care of her while she is paralyzed.
- Brett Dier as Kyle, the captain of the Chance Harbor High School hockey team. He flirts with Faye and Melissa, but has a girlfriend.
- Marcus Rosner as Richard Armstrong, Jake and Nick's father. He died sixteen years prior to the events of the series, but appears in a flashback of the boatyard fire.
- Cindy Busby as Sara Armstrong, Jake and Nick's mother and Richard's wife. She died at the boatyard fire, but appears in a flashback.
- John de Lancie as Royce Armstrong, Richard's father, Jake and Nick's grandfather, and an elder. He is a conspiracy theorist who lives alone and is considered crazy. When Cassie, Faye and Jake try to find his crystal, he tells them where it is, and reveals a theory that Blackwell actually wanted children from the Circle, and caused all their births. His theory is supported by the fact that the Circle members (except Jake) were born one month apart. He later sends Jake a bottle with beads in it, along with a message that the Circles are coming together and his fight is not yet over—although it is unknown why, or what it means. His theories turn out to be true, and he appears to be a very powerful witch, to the point of being able to make spells that counter dark magic.
- Chad Willett as James Conant, Ethan's father, Adam's grandfather, and an elder. He died prior to the events of the series, but appears in a flashback of the night of the boatyard fire. He is shown to have given Amelia his family's crystal to protect herself. She told him the truth about Blackwell, gave the crystal back to him and asked him to tell Ethan that she didn't love him anymore, although they both knew she was lying. He had an affinity for cloaking spells, which Adam inherited.
- Elise Gatien as Elizabeth Meade, Charles' wife and Diana's mother. She died on the night of the boatyard fire, but appears in a flashback. Though married to Charles, she and Blackwell had an affair while she and her husband were separated, and she knew he was Diana's biological father. After seeing Blackwell for what he was, she returned to Charles, but never told him the truth about Diana. When Amelia tried to persuade her not to go to the boatyard, she refused, blaming Amelia for bringing Blackwell into the Circle.
- Arlen Escarpeta as Holden, Melissa's cousin, possibly a witch, on whom Diana once had a crush.
- Luisa D'Oliveira as Simone, a witch hunter who comes to Chance Harbor along with Jake and Isaac to destroy the Circle. She immediately attempts to kill Cassie.
- Chad Rook as Samuel, a witch hunter who knows Jake. He arrives in Chance Harbor to assist the Circle after being betrayed by Eben.

== Episodes ==
No.	Title	Directed by	Written by	Original release date	Prod. code	U.S. viewers (millions)
1	"Pilot"	Liz Friedlander	Teleplay by : Andrew Miller	September 15, 2011	296808	3.05
After her mother's death Cassie Blake moves to Chance Harbor, Washington, to live with her grandmother, Jane. Cassie's life is changed forever when her new classmates tell her that she is a witch, the sixth and final member of their Secret Circle.
2	"Bound"	Liz Friedlander	Kevin Williamson & Andrew Miller	September 22, 2011	2J6252	2.12
Cassie attempts to distance herself from the Circle, even making friends with a non-witch, Sally Matthews. As the witches use their magic more and more recklessly, Diana is convinced they need to bind their powers. This is a problem for Faye, who revels in the increase of the Circle's magic now that Cassie has returned to Chance Harbor. Adam struggles with his feelings for Cassie, while Melissa flirts with Nick. Dawn Chamberlain receives a surprise in the form of her father-in-law, Henry.
3	"Loner"	Colin Bucksey	Richard Hatem	September 29, 2011	2J6253	2.12
Each member of the Circle reacts to the upcoming school dance in a different way. Cassie is asked to go by a classmate, Luke, and accepts after seeing Adam and Diana spending time together. Melissa sees it as an opportunity to get closer to Nick, while Faye has no plans to attend it at all. She prefers to focus on regaining her individual powers, now that the Circle is bound. A man named Zachary Larson has been asking questions about the Circle, causing Dawn to ask Charles to watch over the children.
4	"Heather"	Dave Barrett	David Ehrman	October 6, 2011	2J6254	1.96
After the incident with Zachary Larson, Cassie looks up her mother's old friend, Heather Barnes. She discovers Heather has been in a catatonic state since the night of the fire, sixteen years ago. Knowing that Heather was there that night, Cassie decides to use magic to restore Heather, and asks Faye to help — who is willing to do so, for a price. The girls' witchcraft has unforeseen consequences, when a demon that was possessing Heather is unleashed and wants to use the Circle's power.
5	"Slither"	Liz Friedlander	Dana Baratta	October 13, 2011	2J6255	1.89
Cassie struggles with maintaining her loyalties, as she is forced to keep the Circle's secrets from her suspicious grandmother, and Diana tries to maintain hold of her relationship with Adam and arranges a date night. Melissa recruits Nick and Faye to help her find her family's Book of Shadows; however all is not what it seems. The six members of the Circle are brought together in order to fight off a dark force that threatens them from within. Dawn tries to continue making plans for the Circle with Charles, only to discover that he may have more than business on his mind.
6	"Wake"	Guy Bee	Andrea Newman	October 20, 2011	2J6256	2.12
Following Nick's death his brother, Jake, returns to town. His presence re-constitutes the Circle, however it is up to Cassie to try to convince the other members to accept him; Jake is a man with a past, and not everyone is as willing to trust him. Jake is not the only newcomer to town, as a witch hunter named Simone poses a threat to the Circle.
7	"Masked"	Charles Beeson	Michelle Lovretta	October 27, 2011	2J6257	2.33
It's Halloween and Faye has decided that the Circle needs to have some fun, so she takes it on herself to convince Cassie to throw a party. Faye still has her eyes on wooing Jake back, while a fight with Diana has Adam turning to Cassie, who is trying to make things right with Luke. Meanwhile, the witch hunters have infiltrated the party and plan on doing away with the Circle, once and for all.
8	"Beneath"	John Fawcett	Don Whitehead & Holly Henderson	November 3, 2011	2J6258	2.26
After not hearing from Jane for a few days Cassie begins to worry. Diana decides to enlist the Circle, and Jake, to take up the search for Jane, which takes the group to the isolated home of Faye's grandfather, Henry. A storm turns the day trip into an overnight one, and the teens play Truth or Dare to pass the time. Not all is what it seems at the cabin, however, and Faye is forced to confront something dark from her past.
9	"Balcoin"	Brad Turner	Andrew Miller & Andrea Newman	November 10, 2011	2J6259	2.17
Cassie enlists Jake's help in looking into her father's family, and just why she has powers separate from the Circle. Faye reveals that she suspects that there is more to Jake than he is sharing with the Circle. Adam is torn between his concern for Cassie and his concern for Diana, who has caught the eye of Melissa's cousin, Holden. Dawn and Charles' plans are threatened, as a power shift changes their dynamic.
10	"Darkness"	Chris Grismer	David Ehrman	January 5, 2012	2J6260	2.05
Cassie learns more about her ancestor, Francis Balcoin, and discovers a secret about herself. She turns to Adam to help her keep this from the rest of the Circle. Diana is thrilled when her grandmother, Kate, comes to town for a visit, who appears to show an unusual interest in Cassie. Still trying to get her powers back, Faye turns to the mysterious Lee LeBeque for help.
11	"Fire/Ice"	Joshua Butler	Holly Henderson & Don Whitehead	January 12, 2012	2J6261	1.93
Another school dance is upon the Circle, and Adam's father, Ethan, has offered to chaperone it. Cassie and Adam have been investigating her father's past, causing the flame between them to be rekindled. While Adam is ready to move on and embark upon a relationship with her, Cassie is torn between her feelings for him and her friendship with Diana. Faye asks Lee to perform a ritual that will enable her to steal Cassie's individual powers, but it has dangerous consequences that threatens to destroy the entire Circle.
12	"Witness"	Eagle Egilsson	Dana Baratta	January 19, 2012	2J6262	1.63
Jake returns to Chance Harbor and warns Cassie that unless she determines just what happened to her father on the night of the fire she, and the Circle, will face the same fate. The two cast a spell to allow them to enter into Jake's memories and return to the night of the fire, however Adam and Diana suspect Jake's motives. Charles and Dawn attempt to outmanoeuvre each other, each trying to get Ethan on their side. Faye's relationship with Lee takes another dangerous turn, as she meets his friend, Callum.
13	"Medallion"	Liz Friedlander	Andrew Miller & Andrea Newman	February 2, 2012	2J6263	1.75
Cassie and Jake meet with a psychic, Lucy, who has information about the medallion found in the previous episode. Cassie calls on the Circle for help unlocking its powers, however Adam worries about the dark magic taking over Cassie. Meanwhile, Ethan has enlisted Diana's help in throwing Adam a birthday party, and Faye and Melissa try Devil's Spirit.
14	"Valentine"	Dave Barrett	Roger Grant	February 9, 2012	2J6264	1.82
In honor of the holiday Faye throws a girls-only, "anti-Valentine's Day" slumber party at her house, and the other (female) members of the Circle are invited to attend. The night takes unexpected turns as both Melissa and Diana use Devil's Spirit to get high, and Lee crashes the party to help Faye increase her power. Meanwhile, Cassie turns to Jake and Adam for help after the spirits of vengeful witches begin to haunt her.
15	"Return"	Brad Turner	David Ehrman	February 16, 2012	2J6265	1.76
John Blackwell, Cassie's father, shows up on her doorstep; however surprise turns to suspicion when he wants the medallion. Eben and his band of witch hunters take Cassie captive, causing Jake to offer a trade and Adam to call the other Circle members for help. Meanwhile, Faye and Diana are both concerned that Melissa is spending too much time in the company of Callum.
16	"Lucky"	Joshua Butler	Katie Wech	March 15, 2012	2J6266	1.62
Cassie catches Blackwell sneaking around the abandoned house, leading Adam to believe that he is looking for a device to drain witches' powers and is still consumed by his dark magic. Faye meets Eva, and is taken aback to discover that she is Lee's girlfriend. Meanwhile, Melissa encourages Diana to date a mortal guy, specifically a handsome Australian, named Grant, who is new to town. Also, Dawn has a reunion with Blackwell, but it isn't entirely what she expects.
17	"Curse"	John Fawcett	Don Whitehead & Holly Henderson	March 22, 2012	2J6267	1.74
Blackwell tells Cassie and Adam that while their love might be destined, it is also cursed; once awakened a member of the Circle will die. It is a race against the clock to find a way to break the curse before it takes Jake's life. Meanwhile, Faye becomes certain that Eva is hiding something once it becomes apparent that Lee is missing, and Charles plots against Blackwell.
18	"Sacrifice"	Nick Copus	David Ehrman	March 29, 2012	2J6268	1.33
Witch hunter Samuel comes to town with a message for Blackwell about Eben's plans; he is trying to resurrect the demons that Blackwell summoned to Chance Harbor sixteen years ago, and plans on making a human sacrifice. Meanwhile, Diana continues her relationship with Grant, but it is revealed that her magic is not the only secret in their relationship. Faye and Melissa compete for the attention of a jock at the Boathouse, while Adam tries to deal with no longer remembering why he loved Cassie.
19	"Crystal"	Omar Madha	Micah Schraft	April 19, 2012	2J6269	1.14
To protect themselves from the witch hunters, Jake, Cassie and Faye team up to seek out Jake's grandfather, Royce, to find his family's crystal and are confronted with disturbing theories about the events of sixteen years ago. Meanwhile, Diana tries to balance her pursuit of the Glaser crystal with Melissa and Adam with her new romantic life with Grant, who demands to know what she's hiding. At the same time, Callum attempts to re-insert himself into Melissa's life. Also, Charles and Jane plot their move against Blackwell and it is revealed that Diana is the other Blackwell child. Then Blackwell reveals his dark powers are still intact and he wants to use them to create a black magic Circle with his newly found kids.
20	"Traitor"	Eagle Egilsson	Roger Grant & Katie Wech	April 26, 2012	2J6270	1.15
When a crystal is magically stolen from the abandoned house, the Circle decides it was the traitor witch working with Eben. Jake calls for a meeting with Isaac to see if they can get him to change sides, only to find out that Isaac has been killed by Eben. Cassie’s loose grasp on her dark magic threatens to destroy any possible alliance when their pursuit of the traitor leads them to the “Creepiest Place on Earth.” Meanwhile, Faye and Jake work together to steal Dawn’s crystal, Melissa and Adam pair up and uncover a new magic trick, and a frustrated Diana reaches out to Charles for help. Diana and Cassie chase the traitor in the “Creepiest Place on Earth” and Cassie uses dark magic to stop him only to find out it's Nick who is supposed to be dead.
21	"Prom"	Alex Zakrzewski	Holly Henderson & Don Whitehead	May 3, 2012	2J6271	1.23
It’s Prom night in Chance Harbor and after Adam uncloaks a crystal hidden in the school, Blackwell tells Cassie she can use her dark magic to find it. When Cassie follows this advice, it leads her to a dangerous discovery. Meanwhile, Faye invites Jake to Prom, despite the fact that he stood her up two years earlier. Adam, Diana, Cassie and Melissa finally make it to Prom but when they lose the crystal to Eben, they end up in a life and death situation. Meanwhile, Dawn attempts to stop Blackwell, who casts a deadly spell on Charles.
22	"Family"	Dave Barrett	Andrew Miller & Andrea Newman	May 10, 2012	2J6272	1.28
When Faye is captured by the Witch Hunters, Jake, Melissa and Adam set out to save her. Blackwell wants to unleash the power of the crystal skull and tries to convince Cassie and Diana that their Balcoin blood is the only way to stop the Witch Hunters permanently. Meanwhile, Dawn and Charles discover a way to get their powers back ... but one which comes at a very big cost.

== Development ==
On October 28, 2010, L. J. Smith announced that the series had been optioned for a TV series by the CW. On February 8, 2011, the CW picked up The Secret Circle with Dawson's Creek creator and The Vampire Diaries co-creator/executive producer Kevin Williamson now attached. However, he told the CW that The Vampire Diaries companion series he was directing had been put on hold in order to focus on The Secret Circle. Williamson worked on an original script written by Andrew Miller, creator of the Emmy-nominated web series Imaginary Bitches, with writer credit shared by both men. On February 16, 2011, The Secret Circle booked Liz Friedlander to direct the pilot. Friedlander also directed episodes for The Vampire Diaries, Pretty Little Liars, 90210 and One Tree Hill.

On October 12, 2011, the CW ordered a full season of twenty-two episodes. On May 11, 2012, the CW cancelled the series.

== Broadcast ==
=== Streaming ===
The series is available to stream on the CW's free digital-only network, CW Seed.

== Reception ==
=== Critical reception ===
The pilot was met with mixed reviews, with Metacritic giving a score of 55 out of a 100 based on 20 critics. Lloyd Roberts of the Los Angeles Times thought the pilot was "splendidly rendered; effective in the expected ways in a way that makes you forget you expected them." He then wrote "Director Liz Friedlander aims not just for creepiness but for a tremulous sense of beauty that reflects the heightened sensibilities and hair-trigger sensitivities of adolescence" and appreciated the actors "who are good to look at, but also bring a little soul to their roles."

In 2015, three years following the cancellation of the show, Gavin Hetherington of SpoilerTV looked back on the series finale, as well as the series as a whole. He reviewed the show favorably, commenting "the last several episodes really built up the potential of the show and made it pretty exciting, and it would have led into an awesome second season", and saying that the show should have had a second season, "to further develop the characters and the storylines we were left hanging with".

Phoebe Tonkin's performance was well received by critics; she was featured on Variety's list of new faces to watch and named one of 2011 Breakout TV Stars by E! Online.

=== Cancellation and fan campaign ===
On May 11, 2012, the CW cancelled the series, despite being the network's third-highest rated performer. Following the show's cancellation, a formal fan-led campaign website titled 'Save The Circle' was launched. A letter-writing campaign, targeted at the CW, aimed to encourage the CW to reconsider bringing back the show for a mid-season slot. Campaigns were also launched at other TV networks whose target demographic matched those of the CW—MTV, ABC Family, and Syfy. Fans donated between $1–10 to the Make a Wish Foundation in the name of MTV; this aimed to attach a good cause to the campaign while getting MTV's attention. The Secret Circle executive producer Andrew Miller auctioned a signed poster of the show's cast in support of the campaign. In the end, over $7,000 was raised. The campaign targeted at ABC Family asked fans to donate money to fund a delivery of 325,000 golden plastic coins to the network's headquarters. The coins were symbolic of a 'cloaking coin' that belonged to one of the main characters, Adam Conant's grandfather in the episode "Traitor". The metaphor was that the CW 'cloaked' the show by cancelling it, and fans wanted ABC Family to 'uncloak' the show by picking it up.

A letter-writing campaign to Syfy was also launched, but ultimately the 'Save The Circle' campaign leaders decided against pursuing the network further due to budgetary concerns. Following the announcement that Warner Bros. had unsuccessfully entered talks with ABC Family about picking up the show and that the series would not be shipped to another network, campaigning targeting potential networks for a pick-up ceased. Nevertheless, a new campaign, aimed at Warner Bros, was launched following the announcement that the series' first season would not be released on DVD or Blu-ray. As of September 2012, The Secret Circle is available on Netflix for immediate streaming. A music project was launched, with the aim of developing and distributing a full-length album of 10 fan songs online and making them available for free download. Fans were asked to either submit an audio recording of themselves singing their own songs, or send in lyrics for potential use. Petitions were also set up, in the hope that they would bring back the series. The three main campaigns together, as of June 24, 2012, amassed over 85,500 signatures. Since the show was canceled, fans have voted it "the show that will be missed most" or "Most Shocking Cancellation" in a number of polls, including E!, Clique Clack, Hypable, Spoiler TV, TV Fanatic, TV.com, and Zap2it.

=== Awards and nominations ===
Year	Award	Category	Nominee(s)	Result
2012	People's Choice Awards	Favorite New TV Drama	The Secret Circle	Nominated
2012	Saturn Awards	Best Youth-Oriented Television Series	The Secret Circle	Nominated
2012	PAAFTJ Television Awards	Best Main Title Theme Music	The Secret Circle	Nominated
