= Michael Graziadei =

American actor (born 1979)

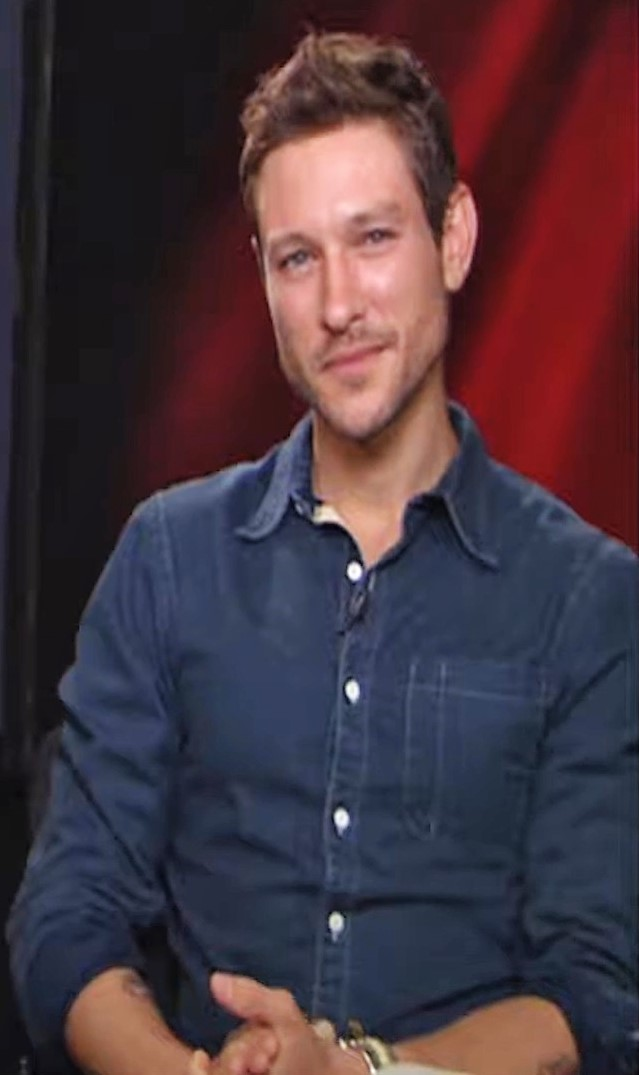
- Graziadei in 2014
- Born: Germany
- Occupation: Actor
- Years active: 2004–present

Michael Graziadei is an American actor, known for his role as Daniel Romalotti on the CBS daytime soap opera The Young and the Restless, for which he received four Daytime Emmy Award nominations.

== Life and career ==
Graziadei was born in Germany. He began acting in Germany, on stage, at the age of 5 in a production of The King and I. While at the University of New Hampshire, he also appeared in The Servant of Two Masters and History of the Devil. In 2004, he was cast as Daniel Romalotti, Phyllis Summers' son, in the CBS daytime soap opera The Young and the Restless. In 2013 he left from soap for career in primetime television. In 2005 and in 2006, he was nominated for a Daytime Emmy Award for Outstanding Younger Actor in a Drama Series. In film, Graziadei starred in the films Boogeyman 2 (2007), Into the Blue 2: The Reef (2009), and The Outside (2009).

Graziadei guest-starred in a number of television series, including NCIS, Criminal Minds, 90210, Castle, CSI: Crime Scene Investigation, and Agents of S.H.I.E.L.D.. He had recurring roles on FX's American Horror Story as Travis Wanderley, a young boyfriend of Jessica Lange's character, and on The CW's The Secret Circle. In 2013, after leaving daytime television, Graziadei was cast in ABC's unsold drama pilot Westside. Later, he was cast as the male lead in the Lifetime drama series The Lottery, opposite Marley Shelton. The show was cancelled after one season.

In August 2016, Graziadei reprised his portrayal of Daniel Romalotti on The Young and the Restless for a limited run, in celebration of the soap's 11,000th episode. He also landed recurring roles on the Audience mixed martial arts drama series Kingdom and the Amazon Video historical drama series Good Girls Revolt.

In 2018, Graziadei appeared in episode 3 of the remake of Magnum P.I.; he played Tara's ex-boyfriend and kidnapper in the episode entitled "The Woman Who Never Died", originally airing on October 8, 2018.

In 2026, Graziadel was nominated for a Daytime Emmy Award for Outstanding Supporting Actor in a Drama Series.

== Filmography ==
=== Film ===
| Year | Title | Role | Notes |
|---|---|---|---|
| 2007 | Boogeyman 2 | Darren | Direct to video |
| 2009 | Into the Blue 2: The Reef | Mace | Direct to video |
| 2009 | The Outside | Ned Blakey | |
| 2011 | Halfway to a Blackout | Chas Knopfler | Short film |
| 2012 | Transspecular | Bobby Brovado | Short film |
| 2013 | The Blackout | Chas Knopfler | |
| 2016 | Her Last Will | Harold Cotton | |

=== Television ===
| Year | Title | Role | Notes |
|---|---|---|---|
| 2004 | Grounded for Life | College Guy | Episode: "Communication Breakdown" |
| 2004–13, 2016, 2022–present | The Young and the Restless | Daniel Romalotti | 917 episodes |
| 2004 | NCIS | Chuck | Episode: "Split Decision" |
| 2008 | Criminal Minds | Steven | Episode: "In Heat" |
| 2008 | The Cleaner | Aaron | Episode: "Pilot" |
| 2008 | 90210 | Eric | 3 episodes |
| 2009 | Castle | Brent Johnson | Episode: "Nanny McDead" |
| 2009 | Crash | Gavin Buckley | 3 episodes |
| 2010 | CSI: NY | Keith Borgese | Episode: "Sanguine Love" |
| 2010 | Saving Grace | Kaz | Episode: "Let's Talk" |
| 2010 | Miami Medical | Scott | Episode: "Golden Hour" |
| 2010 | Ghost Whisperer | Kyle/Seth | Episode: "Dead Ringer" |
| 2010 | CSI: Crime Scene Investigation | Kurt Francis | Episode: "Blood Moon" |
| 2011 | Necessary Roughness | Tyler Paxton | Episode: "Dream On" |
| 2011 | American Horror Story: Murder House | Travis Wanderley | 5 episodes |
| 2012 | The Secret Circle | Callum | 5 episodes |
| 2012 | The Mob Doctor | Louis | Episode: "Confessions" |
| 2013 | Justified | Mason Goines | Episode: "Truth and Consequences" |
| 2013 | The Client List | Bobby | Episode: "Unanswered Prayers" |
| 2013 | Longmire | Richard Montero | Episode: "Sound and Fury" |
| 2013 | Agents of S.H.I.E.L.D. | Jakob Nystrom | Episode: "The Well" |
| 2014 | Grimm | Ken | Episode: "My Fair Wesen" |
| 2014 | The Lottery | Kyle Walker | Lead role; 10 episodes |
| 2015 | NCIS: New Orleans | Kai Bryant | Episode: "You'll Do" |
| 2015 | Hawaii Five-0 | Mark Sheppard | Episode: "Na Pilikua Nui" |
| 2015 | Kingdom | Drew Parker | 3 episodes |
| 2016 | Stitchers | Roman Bain | Episode: "Midnight Stitcher" |
| 2016 | Good Girls Revolt | Gregory | 5 episodes |
| 2016 | Scorpion | Ronen Cole | Episode: "Little Boy Lost" |
| 2017 | MacGyver | Wyatt Orwell | Episode: "Control" |
| 2017 | APB | James Kilton | Episode: "Hate of Comrades" |
| 2017 | The Night Shift | Martin Easton | Episode: "Control" |
| 2017 | Chicago P.D. | Josh Miller | Episode: "Care Under Fire" |
| 2018 | Magnum P.I. | Val Jenson | Episode: "The Woman Who Never Died" |
| 2019 | True Detective | Dan O'Brien | 3 episodes |
| 2019 | 9-1-1 | Eric Lawrence Parnell | Episode: "New Beginnings" |
| 2019 | Proven Innocent | Jeff Skadden | Episode: "The Burden of Truth" |
| 2019 | Watchmen | Carmichael | Episode: "It's Summer and We're Running Out of Ice" |
| 2019 | All Rise | Choke | Episode: "How to Succeed in Law Without Really Re-Trying" |
| 2020 | The Magicians | Raylan Cortez | Episode: "Garden Variety Homicide" |
| 2020 | Lucifer | 'Dirty Doug' Sargisian | Episode: "Really Sad Devil Guy" |
| 2020 | L.A.'s Finest | Garth Haney | Episode: "Gone in 60 Seconds" |
| 2020 | S.W.A.T. | Mitch Anderson | Episode: "Memento Mori" |
| 2021 | The Rookie | Sergeant Mark Murray | Episode: "Triple Duty" |
| 2022 | The Lincoln Lawyer | Jeff Golantz | 6 episodes |

== Awards and nominations ==
List of awards and nominations
| Year | Award | Category | Work | Result | Ref. |
|---|---|---|---|---|---|
| 2005 | Soap Opera Digest Award | Outstanding Male Newcomer | The Young and the Restless | Nominated | |
| 2005 | Daytime Emmy Award | Outstanding Younger Actor in a Drama Series | The Young and the Restless | Nominated | |
| 2006 | Daytime Emmy Award | Outstanding Younger Actor in a Drama Series | The Young and the Restless | Nominated | |
| 2025 | Daytime Emmy Award | Outstanding Supporting Actor in a Drama Series | The Young and the Restless | Nominated | |
| 2026 | Daytime Emmy Award | Outstanding Supporting Actor in a Drama Series | The Young and the Restless | Nominated | |
