= Ashley Crow =

American actress

- Occupation: Actress
- Years active: 1986–present

Ashley Crow is an American actress. She is best known for her role of Sandra Bennet on the television show Heroes.

== Life and career ==
Crow first appeared in a minor role on the U.S. soap opera Guiding Light in the 1980s, followed by a longer role as Beatrice McKechnie on As the World Turns. She later co-starred with Parker Stevenson in the short-lived science fiction TV series Probe. Since then, she has appeared in guest roles on various television shows, including Dark Angel, Everybody Loves Raymond, Touched by an Angel, Party of Five, Nip/Tuck, and The Mentalist. She had a major recurring role on Heroes as Sandra Bennet, wife of Primatech operative Noah Bennet (Jack Coleman).

Her roles in film include appearances in Minority Report, Little Big League, and The Good Son, among others.

Crow is the mother of MLB center fielder Pete Crow-Armstrong.

== Filmography ==
=== Film ===
Year	Title	Role	Notes
1993	The Good Son	Janice Evans	
1994	Little Big League	Jenny Heywood	
1995	True Crime	Roxanne	Video
1999	The Cracker Man	Gloria Turner	
2002	Minority Report	Sarah Marks	
2004	Catalina View	Susan	Short film
2013	Little Paradise	Aunt Laura	
2014	Cake	Stephanie	

=== Television ===
Year	Title	Role	Notes
1986–1987	As the World Turns	Beatrice McColl	TV series
1987	The Equalizer	Samantha Chesborough	Episode: "In the Money"
1988	Probe	Michelle Castle	Main role (7 episodes)
1990	Blue Bayou	Morgan Fontenot	TV film
1990	Kojak: None So Blind	Debbie Hogarth	TV film
1991	A Woman Named Jackie	Lee Bouvier Radziwill	Episode: "The Bouvier Years"
1991	Final Verdict	Belle Rogers	TV film
1991	Law & Order	Mrs. Jenna Kealey	Episode: "Renunciation"
1992	Middle Ages	Cindy Nelson Cooper	Main role (6 episodes)
1993	Final Appeal	Dolores Brody	TV film
1994	Because Mommy Works	Claire Forman	TV film
1996	Champs	Linda McManus	Main role (12 episodes)
1996	Never Give Up: The Jimmy V Story	Pam	TV film
1996	Dark Angel	Anna St. Cyr	TV film
1996	Touched by an Angel	Jocelyn	Episode: "Groundrush"
1996	Early Edition	Nikki Porter	Episode: "Gun"
1999	Cracker: Mind Over Murder	Linda Benson	Episode: "Best Boys"
1999	Turks	Ginny	Main role (13 episodes)
1999	Silk Hope	Natalie	TV film
1999	Everybody Loves Raymond	Jennifer Whelan	Episode: "The Sister"
2000	Going Home	Meg	TV film
2000	Party of Five	Beth Colt	Episode: "All's Well..."
2001	Dark Angel	Trudy	Episode: "Haven"
2002	Strong Medicine	Christine Hedley	Episode: "Discharged"
2003	Dragnet	Alice Kerian	Episode: "The Silver Slayer"
2004	Nip/Tuck	Judge	Episode: "Joel Gideon"
2004	American Dreams	Sister Mary Agnes	Episodes: "Long Shots and Short Skirts", "Charade"
2006–2010	Heroes	Sandra Bennet	Recurring role (41 episodes)
2009	The Mentalist	Chief Elaine Brody	Episode: "Blood Brothers"
2010	In Plain Sight	Janine	Episode: "No Clemency for Old Men"
2010	Grey's Anatomy	Linda Cotler	Episode: "Shock to the System"
2011–2012	The Secret Circle	Jane Blake	Regular role (11 episodes)
2014	Supernatural	Mama	Episode: "Alex Annie Alexis Ann"
