= Adam J. Harrington =

Canadian actor and producer (born 1972)

Adam John Harrington
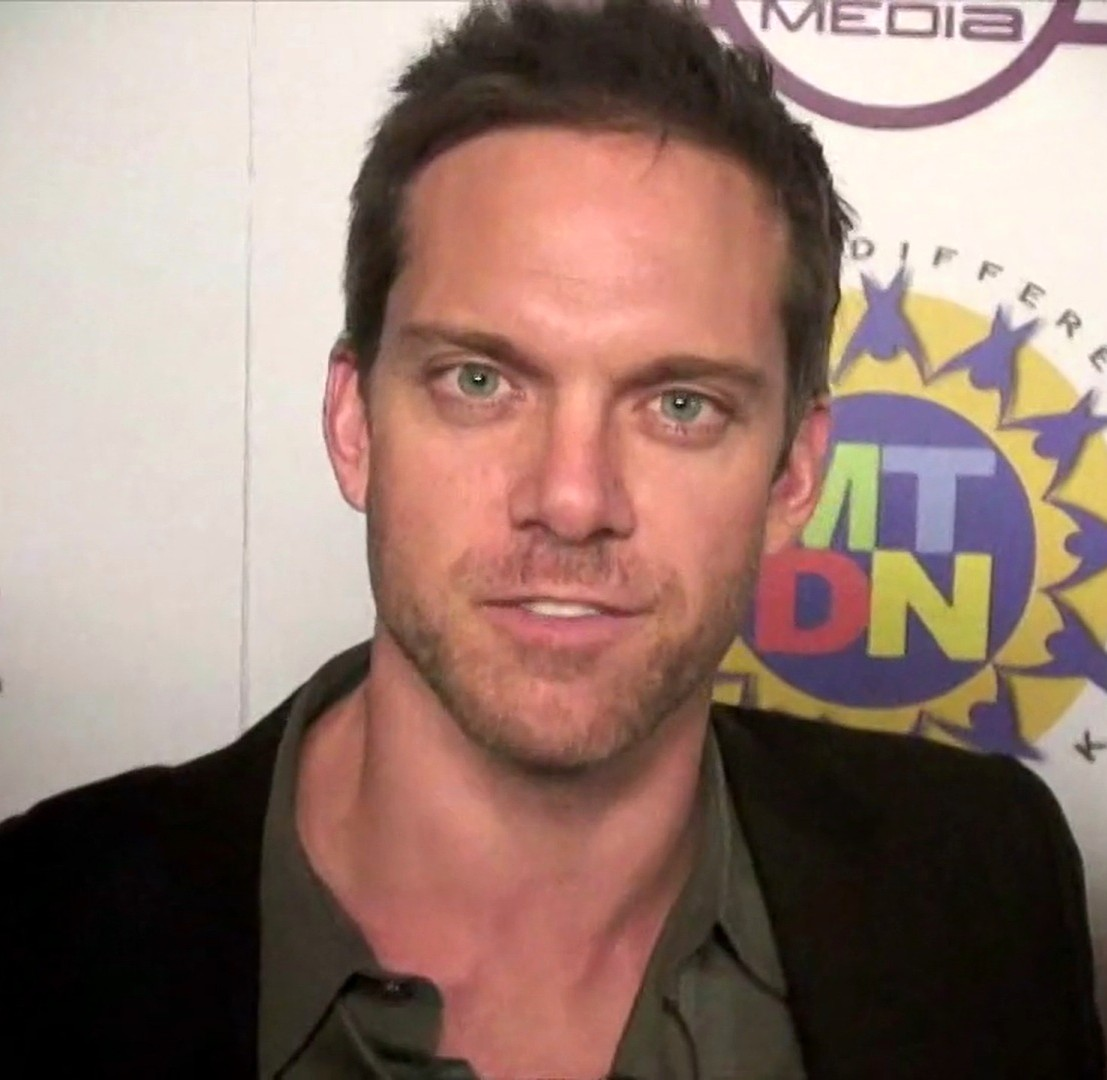
- Harrington in 2008
- Born: November 26, 1972 (age 53); Hamilton, Ontario, Canada
- Occupations: Actor; producer
- Years active: 1996–present

Adam John Harrington (born November 26, 1972) is a Canadian actor and producer. He is known for his role as Roy Earle in the 2011 video game L.A. Noire. He has also appeared on Supernatural, The Secret Circle, Queer as Folk, Dexter and Bosch. He is also known for portraying Sindri in the 2018 video game God of War and its 2022 sequel God of War Ragnarök, for which he received a nomination for the British Academy Games Award for Performer in a Supporting Role.

== Personal life ==
Harrington was born in Hamilton, Ontario, and raised in the nearby towns of Dundas and Burlington, where he attended Burlington Central High School. He earned a master's degree in marine biology before becoming an actor. He currently lives in Los Angeles. To avoid being confused with another actor of the same name, professionally he uses his middle initial and thus goes by “Adam J. Harrington".

== Career ==
Harrington's film debut was as Hank in Sanctimony. He was later cast in Showtime's Out of Order and had a recurring role as Ronald Basderic on CSI: Crime Scene Investigation during the 2012–13 season. He played the fallen angel Bartholomew, in the ninth season of Supernatural. He had a starring role on The CW's drama series The Secret Circle. He also worked at Sealand Oceanariums in Nanaimo, British Columbia.

In February 2024, Harrington debuted in the role of Jagger Cates on the ABC soap opera General Hospital.

== Filmography ==
=== Film ===
Year	Title	Role	Notes
1997	Wounded	Paramedic	
2000	Sanctimony	Hank	
2001	Valentine	Jason Marquette	
2001	Out Cold	Team Snownook Leader	
2003	House of the Dead	Agent Thomas Rogan	
2004	Connie and Carla	Cute Guy	
2007	Surviving My Mother	Michael	
2008	Passchendaele	Colonel Ormond	
2009	The Ugly Truth	Jack Magnum	
2011	Life of Lemon	Rob	
2011	Lucky	Steve Mason	
2011	Faces in the Crowd	Bryce	
2015	The Heyday of the Insensitive Bastards	Henry	

=== Television ===
Year	Title	Role	Notes
1996–1999	The Outer Limits	Puppet Show Host / Billy Valentine / Ty Chafey	3 episodes
1997	Millennium	Uniformed Cop	Episode: "Sense and Antisense"
1997–2002	Stargate SG-1	Khonsu / Goa'uld #2	2 episodes
1998	Breaker High	Serge	Episode: "Don't Go Breakin' My Art"
1998	Welcome to Paradox	Davey	Episode: "The Girl Who Was Plugged In"
1998	Viper	New Driver #1	Episode: "The Return"
1999	Mentors	Sandy Mear	Episode: "A Transient, Shining Trouble"
1999	The Crow: Stairway to Heaven	Brock Draven / Ghost Soldier	Episode: "Brother's Keeper"
1999–2004	Da Vinci's Inquest	Phil Mizlowski / Josh Warner	2 episodes
2000	Secret Agent Man	Dr. Chelton	Episode: "WhupSumAss"
2000	First Wave	Acolyte	Episode: "The Believers"
2000	Freedom	Major Blaine Conrad	2 episodes
2000–2001	Seven Days	Darren Sebastian / Tyson Langford	2 episodes
2001	The Chris Isaak Show	Father Ken	Episode: "Mr. Isaak's Opus"
2001	Till Dad Do Us Part	Brent Fenwick III	Television film
2001	Bratty Babies	Doug	Television film
2002	Dead in a Heartbeat	Coroner	Television film
2002	The Most Extreme	Narrator	Television series
2003	Andromeda	High Guard Captain Grissum	Episode: "The Risk-All Point"
2003	Just Cause	Kyle Summers	Episode: "Dying to Be Thin"
2003	The Dead Zone	Bill Stade	Episode: "The Man Who Never Was"
2003	Out of Order	Brock	Miniseries
2003	Jeremiah	Team Leader	2 episodes
2004	Deep Evil	Major Michael Ross	Television film
2004–2005	Queer as Folk	Connor James	4 episodes
2004–2005	Show Me Yours	Dr. Benjamin Chase	16 episodes
2005	Smallville	Dr. Litvack	Episode: "Lexmas"
2006	Flight 93	Dixie	Television film
2006	The Secret of Hidden Lake	Sam	Television film
2006–2007	Whistler	Ryan McKaye	26 episodes
2010	CSI: NY	Officer Noonan	Episode: "Vacation Getaway"
2010	Outlaw	Dr. Jeffrey Engler	Episode: "In Re: Officer Daniel Hale"
2010	Dexter	Agent Ray Walker	4 episodes
2011	CSI: Miami	First Officer	Episode: "Mayday"
2011–2012	The Secret Circle	Ethan Conant	9 episodes
2012	Luck	Dennis Bowman	2 episodes
2012	Castle	Brad Melville	Episode: "A Dance with Death"
2012	Parks and Recreation	Congressman David Murray	Episode: "Sex Education"
2012–2013	The Mob Doctor	Agent Owen York	6 episodes
2012–2013	CSI: Crime Scene Investigation	Ronald Basderic	2 episodes
2012–2014	Drop Dead Diva	Attorney Carlyle	4 episodes
2013	Criminal Minds	Phillip Connor	Episode: "#6"
2013–2014	Supernatural	Bartholomew	2 episodes
2014	Baby Daddy	Mark Clements	Episode: "From Here to Paternity"
2014	NCIS: New Orleans	Jason Axelrod	Episode: "Watch Over Me"
2014	Major Crimes	Daniel Maguire	Episode: "Down the Drain"
2015–2016	Turn: Washington's Spies	Lieutenant Gamble / Sutherland	5 episodes
2016	Shadowhunters	Michael Wayland	2 episodes
2016	Notorious	Brian Farringdon	Episode: "Chase"
2017	Training Day	Rick Quanstrom	Episode: "Trigger Time"
2017	NCIS: Los Angeles	Robert Bryant	Episode: "Battle Scars"
2017	Daytime Divas	Jason Abel	5 episodes
2017	Wisdom of the Crowd	Chris Zymuski	Episode: "Trojan Horse"
2019	Dirty John	Matt Murphy	Episode: "This Young Woman Fought Like Hell"
2019	The Rookie	Dale	Episode: "Plain Clothes Day"
2019	NCIS	Coast Guard Cmdr. Sam Hendrix	Episode: "Mona Lisa"
2020	S.W.A.T.	Pronger	Episode: "Vice"
2020–2021	Bosch	FBI Agent Jack Brenner	9 episodes
2020–2021	Station 19	Lane Bishop	3 episodes
2022	The Sex Lives of College Girls	Eric's Dad	Episode: "The Essex College Food Workers Strike"
2023	The Lincoln Lawyer	Jeff Trammell	3 episodes
2024	General Hospital	John Cates	64 episodes
2024	Palm Royale	Agent Stevens	2 episodes
2025	Chicago Fire	Cliff Belfort	Episode: "Broken Things"
TBA	Bishop †	Eric Olsen	TBD episodes

Key
Clock	Denotes television productions that have not yet been released

=== Video games ===
Year	Title	Role	Notes
2011	L.A. Noire	Roy Earle	Voice and motion capture
2014	Fearless Fantasy	King Xola	Voice and motion capture
2015	Battlefield Hardline	Tyson Latchford	Voice and motion capture
2018	God of War	Sindri	Voice and motion capture
2022	God of War Ragnarök	Sindri	Voice and motion capture

Preceded by Antonio Sabàto Jr.	Jagger Cates (role); 2024	None
