= Jessica Parker Kennedy =

Canadian actress (born 1984)

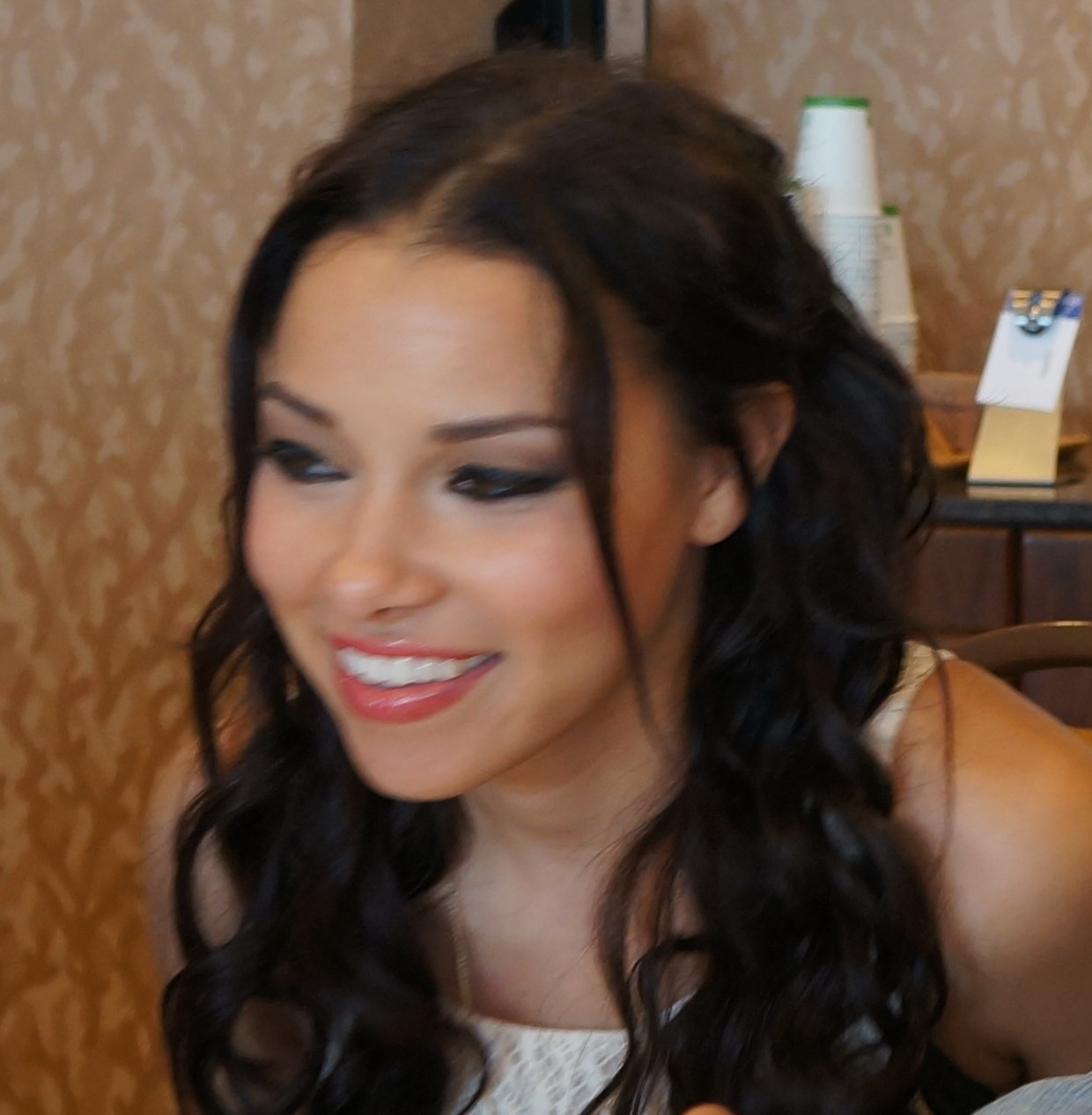
- Kennedy in 2013
- Born: October 3, 1984 (age 42); Calgary, Alberta, Canada
- Occupation: Actress
- Years active: 2006–present
- Spouse: Ronen Rubinstein (m. 2022)
- Children: 1

Jessica Parker Kennedy (born October 3, 1984) is a Canadian actress known as Melissa Glaser in The Secret Circle, Max on Black Sails, and Nora West-Allen / XS in The Flash. She also had guest roles on Smallville, Undercovers, Kaya and Colony.

== Early life ==
Kennedy was born in Calgary, Alberta, Canada, the child of an Afro-Canadian father and a Jewish mother. Growing up, Kennedy says there were very few people of color around, and she was friends with the sole black girl at her school. She had gravitated to friendships with other black people later as a means of finding community. Kennedy was raised Jewish.

== Career ==
Kennedy portrayed supervillain Plastique in the television series Smallville, the role of Tami in the 2008 comedy film Another Cinderella Story alongside Selena Gomez, and the recurring character of Natalee on the 2007 television series Kaya on MTV.

Kennedy was originally cast in the J. J. Abrams-produced 2010 spy drama series Undercovers as the younger sister of the female lead (played by Gugu Mbatha-Raw) but was later replaced by Mekia Cox. Kennedy played Melissa Glaser in the CW series The Secret Circle until the show was cancelled after one season in May 2012. Kennedy was cast as the ambitious Nassau prostitute Max on the Starz TV show Black Sails. In 2017, Kennedy joined the CW's Arrowverse, appearing primarily on the live-action series The Flash. Her character appeared throughout the fourth season as Nora West-Allen and was promoted to series regular for the fifth season using the superhero name XS. She then returned for seasons seven, eight, and nine.

Kennedy appeared as a guest star in the 3rd season of the sketch comedy TV series I Think You Should Leave with Tim Robinson in 2023, and appeared in a guest role as Medusa in the Disney+ series Percy Jackson and the Olympians.

== Personal life ==
She is married to Israeli-American actor Ronen Rubinstein. They reside in Los Angeles. Parker Kennedy expressed encouragement for him coming out as bisexual in 2021. They married in August 2022, with a Jewish wedding ceremony. They welcomed their first child, Boydd Parker-Rubinstein, on September 29, 2024.

== Filmography ==
=== Film ===
| Year | Title | Role | Notes |
|---|---|---|---|
| 2010 | Karma Inc. | Candy | Short |
| 2011 | 50/50 | Jackie | |
| 2011 | In Time | Edouarda | |
| 2011 | Bad Meat | Estelle | |
| 2015 | The Perfect Guy | Rachel | |
| 2017 | Gemini | Sierra | |
| 2018 | Cam | Katie | |
| 2018 | Deep Murder | Phyllis "Babysitter" Gorman | |
| 2019 | Business Ethics | Dr. Helen | |
| 2021 | See for Me | Kelly | |
| 2024 | Good Bad Things | Madi | |

=== Television ===
| Year | Title | Role | Notes |
|---|---|---|---|
| 2006 | Santa Baby | Lucy the Elf | Television film |
| 2007 | Decoys 2: Alien Seduction | Beautiful Girl | Video |
| 2007 | Kaya | Natalee | 10 episodes |
| 2008 | Another Cinderella Story | Tami | Television film |
| 2008 | Desperate Hours: An Amber Alert | Sandy | Television film |
| 2008–2010 | Smallville | Bette Sans Souci / Plastique | 3 episodes |
| 2009 | Exes and Ohs | Amy | Episode: "You Don't Know Jack" |
| 2009 | Fear Itself | Becca | Episode: "The Spirit Box" |
| 2009 | Soul | Alicia | 5 episodes |
| 2009 | Valemont | Beatrice | 33 episodes |
| 2009 | Santa Baby 2: Christmas Maybe | Lucy the Elf | Television film |
| 2009–2010 | The Troop | Laurel | 2 episodes |
| 2010 | V | Grace | Episode: "John May" |
| 2010 | Undercovers | Lizzy | "Pilot" episode |
| 2010 | Brothers & Sisters | Angie | Episode: "The Rhapsody of Flesh" |
| 2010 | Lie to Me | Alison Roberts | Episode: "Beyond Belief" |
| 2011 | Fairly Legal | Jessica Nord | "Pilot" Episode |
| 2011 | Collision Earth | Brooke Adamson | Television film |
| 2011 | Behemoth | Zoe | Television film |
| 2011–2012 | The Secret Circle | Melissa Glaser | Main cast |
| 2012–2013 | 90210 | Megan Rose | Recurring role, 6 episodes |
| 2013 | Nearlyweds | Casey | Television film |
| 2014–2017 | Black Sails | Max | Main cast |
| 2017 | Lethal Weapon | DJ | Episode: "Homebodies" |
| 2017 | I Love Bekka & Lucy | Bekka | Main cast |
| 2017 | Colony | Maya | Recurring role, 5 episodes |
| 2017 | Ransom | Charlotte Walker | Episode: "The Enemy Within" |
| 2017 | Tales | Unique | 2 episodes |
| 2017 | Supergirl | Mystery Girl | Episode "Crisis on Earth-X, Part 1" |
| 2018–2019; 2021–2023 | The Flash | Nora West-Allen / XS | Recurring role (season 4, 7–9); Series regular (season 5); 35 episodes |
| 2020 | Acting for a Cause | Kara Bingham | Episode: “Up in the Air” |
| 2022; 2024 | The Old Man | Woman at Bus Stop | "Episode III", "Episode XIV" |
| 2023 | I Think You Should Leave with Tim Robinson | Megan | Episode "THAT WAS THE EARTH TELLING ME I’M SUPPOSED TO DO SOMETHING GREAT" |
| 2023 | Under the Christmas Sky | Kat Butler | Television film |
| 2023 | Percy Jackson and the Olympians | Medusa | Episode: "We Visit the Garden Gnome Emporium" |
