= Shelley Hennig =

American actress and model (born 1987)

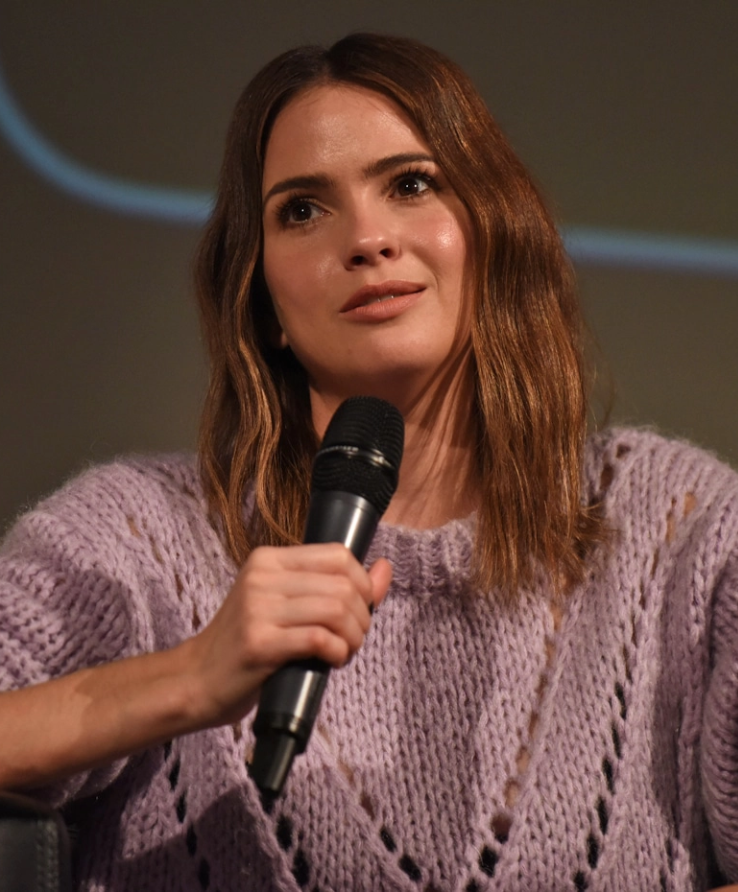
- Hennig in 2019
- Born: January 2, 1987 (age 39); Metairie, Louisiana, U.S.
- Occupations: Actress; model
- Beauty pageant titleholder
- Title: Miss Louisiana Teen USA 2004; Miss Teen USA 2004
- Years active: 2004–present
- Major competitions: Miss Teen USA 2004 (Winner)

Shelley Hennig (born January 2, 1987) is an American actress, model and beauty queen. She is the recipient of several accolades, including a Teen Choice Award and two Daytime Emmy Award nominations.

Prior to pursuing an acting career, Hennig competed in beauty pageants and won the Miss Teen USA 2004 competition. She landed her first major role as Stephanie Johnson on the soap opera Days of Our Lives (2007–2011, 2017) and went on to appear in The CW supernatural teen drama The Secret Circle (2011–2012). She gained further prominence for portraying Malia Tate on the MTV supernatural drama series Teen Wolf (2014–2017) and CIA agent Ava Winters in the Netflix action comedy Obliterated (2023). She has appeared in the films Ouija (2014), Unfriended (2014), and When We First Met (2018).

== Early life ==
Hennig was born in Metairie, Louisiana, on January 2, 1987, the daughter of Cathy Distefano Gosset and Glenn H. Hennig Sr.

== Career ==
=== Modeling ===
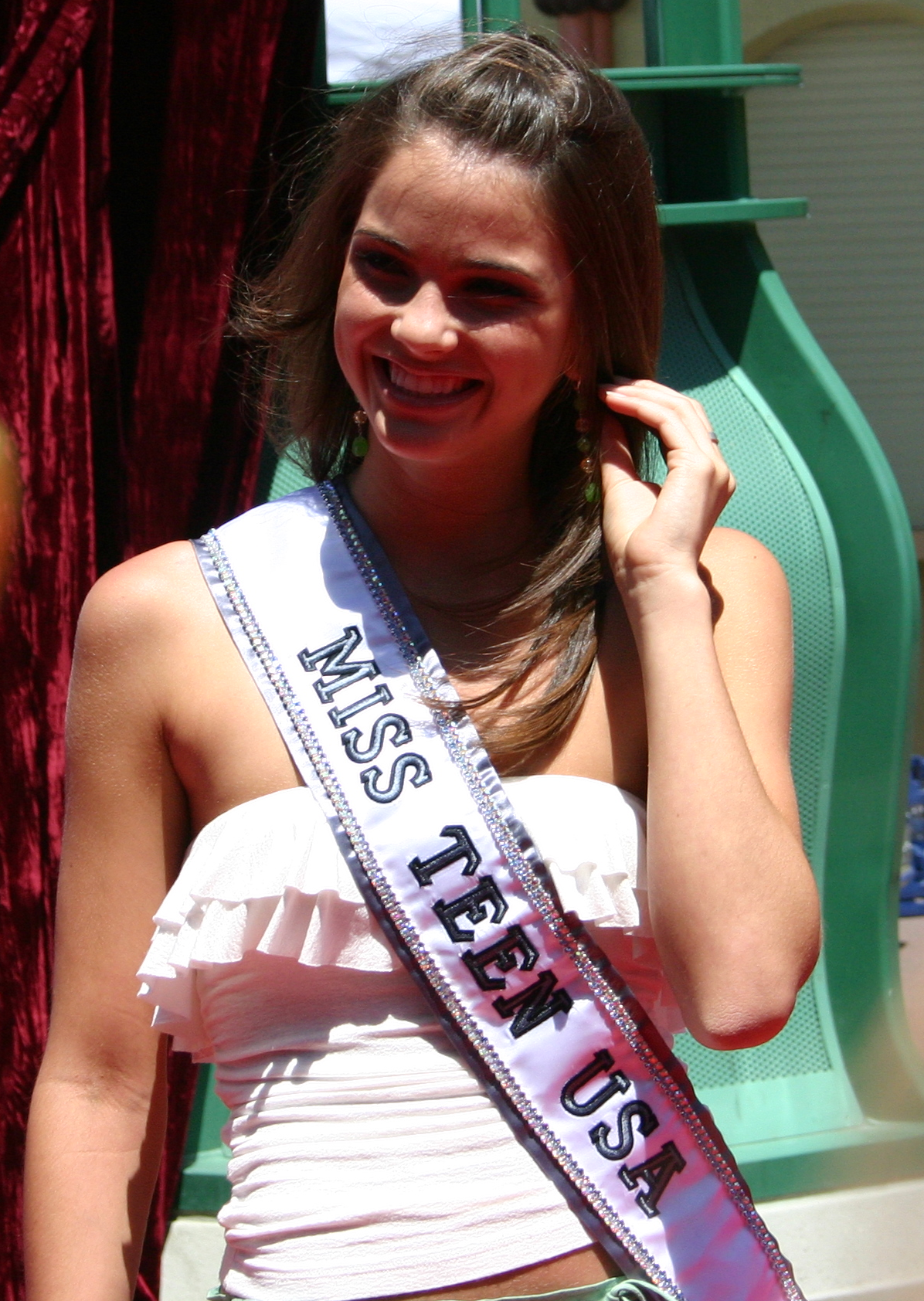
Hennig in 2004

Hennig won the Miss Louisiana Teen USA 2004 in a state pageant held in Lafayette, Louisiana, in November 2004. This was the first time she competed in the state pageant. She represented Louisiana in the Miss Teen USA 2004, held in Palm Springs, California. She won the Miss Teen USA title, becoming the first winner from Louisiana and the first girl from Louisiana to win a national title since Ali Landry was Miss USA 1996. Her Miss Teen USA winnings included a one-year modeling contract with Trump Modeling Management, and a scholarship to the New York Conservatory for Dramatic Arts.

As Miss Teen USA, Hennig represented the Miss Universe Organization. Her sister 2004 titleholders were Jennifer Hawkins (Miss Universe, of Australia) and Shandi Finnessey (Miss USA, of Missouri), with whom she made appearances, which included a trip to Bangkok, Thailand. During her reign, Hennig made numerous television guest and public-speaking appearances, including a guest appearance in the NBC soap opera Passions, which was part of her prize package. Hennig also worked with a number of other nonprofit organizations, including Seeds of Peace, DARE, Sparrow Clubs, and SHiNE. Her reign ended on August 8, 2005, when she crowned Allie LaForce of Ohio as the new Miss Teen USA. Soon after she relinquished her crown, Hennig participated in MTV's The Reality Show, where she attempted to win her own show, After the Crown, but was eliminated. She hosted the Miss Teen USA 2008 pageant on August 16, 2008, along with co-host Seth Goldman.

=== Acting ===
On April 20, 2007, Hennig joined the cast of Days of Our Lives in the contract role of Stephanie Johnson. In 2010, she received a nomination for the 37th Daytime Emmy Awards in the Outstanding Younger Actress in a Drama Series category. On January 18, 2011, Hennig announced that she was leaving Days of Our Lives. She was quoted in Soap Opera Digest, saying: "It just feels right. I have been preparing for this for a while, so I have said my mental good-byes. I will miss the faces I see here every day, but everybody has been really encouraging and has embraced my decision ... I feel like I'm going out with a bang after last week's show airs and I feel great about it creatively and I am thankful to the writers for giving me that. It's been a lot of fun to play and I wouldn't change anything."

From 2011 to 2012, she played Diana Meade, a main character in the TV series The Secret Circle, based on the books written by L. J. Smith. On May 11, 2012, it was announced that the series would not be returning for a second season. She then appeared in the MTV series Zach Stone Is Gonna Be Famous as Christy. The show was cancelled after one season.

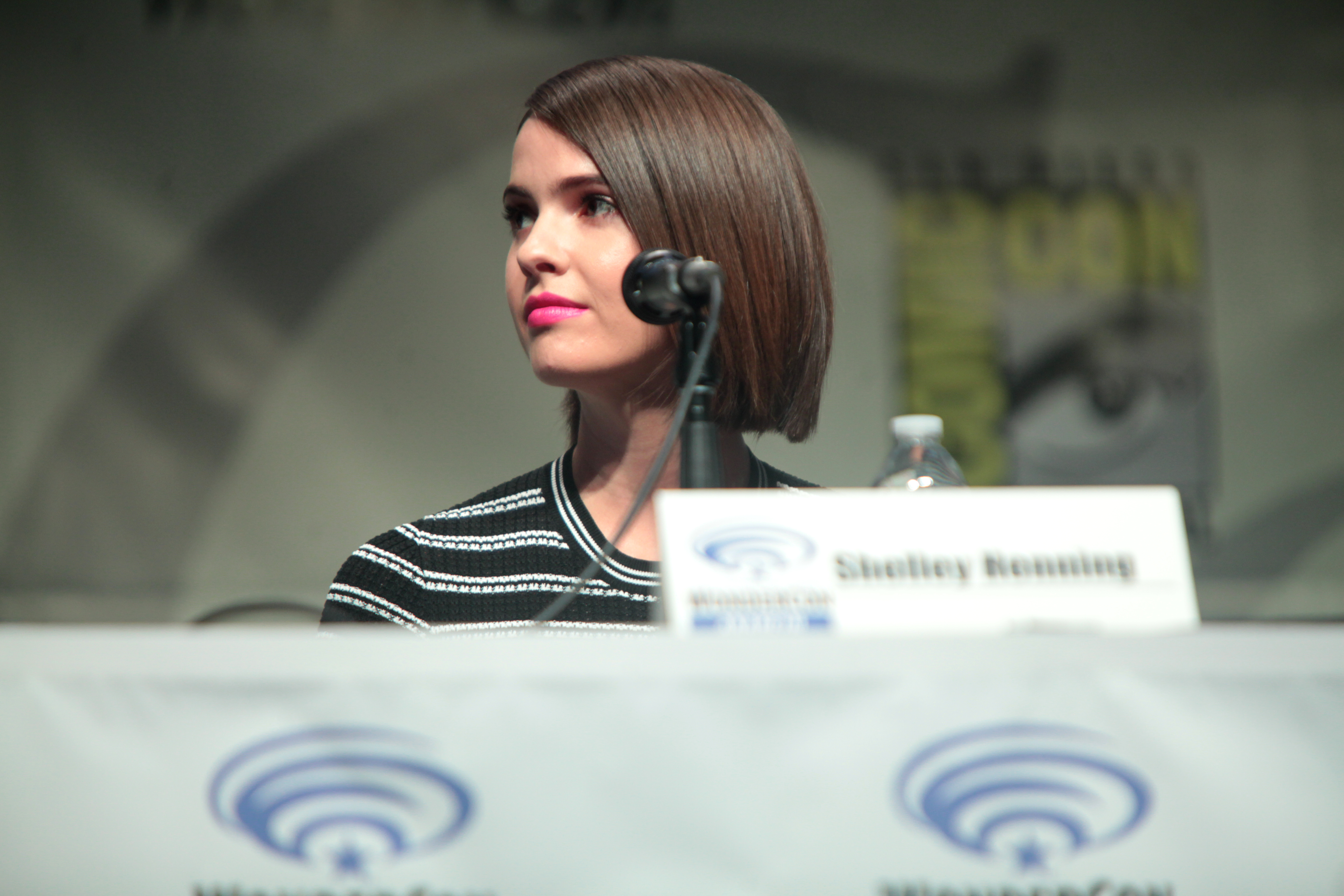
Hennig in 2015

Beginning in the third season, Hennig appeared as Malia Tate on the MTV series Teen Wolf. She was promoted to series regular for the fourth season and remained part of the show until it ended in 2017. For her portrayal of Malia, she won Choice Summer TV Star: Female at the 2016 Teen Choice Awards. In 2014, she appeared in the Blumhouse horror films Ouija and Unfriended. She also appeared on the Band Perry's music video for "Gentle on My Mind". In 2017, she starred in country music artist Maren Morris' music video for "I Could Use a Love Song". In 2018, she played a supporting role as a photographer, Carrie Grey, in the Netflix romantic comedy When We First Met. On March 10, 2020, Hennig was cast in an upcoming NBC comedy pilot Crazy for You in a leading role. The pilot was to be produced by Rachele Lynn, who is known for her work in Saturday Night Live. The series' release date was unknown at that time.

In September 2021, it was announced that a reunion film for Teen Wolf had been ordered by Paramount+, with Jeff Davis returning as a screenwriter and executive producer of the film. The majority of the original cast members, including Hennig herself, were set to reprise their roles. The film was released on January 26, 2023.

== Charity work ==
Hennig has spoken out against underage drinking. She has done work with a local Louisiana nonprofit, Council on Alcohol and Drug Abuse, for whom she has mentored peers and other youths about the impacts and consequences of drug and alcohol abuse.

== Filmography ==
Key
†	Denotes films that have not yet been released

=== Film ===
Year	Title	Role	Notes
2014	Ouija	Debbie Galardi	
2014	Unfriended	Blaire Lily	
2015	About Scout	Melinda Riley	
2016	Summer of 8	Lily Hunter	
2017	Roman J. Israel, Esq.	Olivia Reed	
2018	When We First Met	Carrie Grey	
2018	The After Party	Alicia Levine	
2022	Gatlopp	Alice	
2023	Teen Wolf: The Movie	Malia Tate	
2023	The List	Sam	
2024	Cult Killer	Jamie Douglas	
2025	Hunting Season	January	
2025	Fluxx	Vada / Raven	
2026	Best Pancakes in the County	Dolly	

=== Television ===
Year	Title	Role	Notes
2004	Passions	Crane Maid	Guest role; 2 episodes
2007–2011, 2017	Days of Our Lives	Stephanie Johnson	Regular role; 470 episodes
2011–2012	The Secret Circle	Diana Meade	Main role
2012	Friend Me	Isabelle	Unaired television series
2013	Justified	Jackie Nevada	Episode: "Money Trap"
2013	Zach Stone Is Gonna Be Famous	Christy Ackerman	Recurring role
2014–2017	Teen Wolf	Malia Tate	Recurring role (season 3), Main role (seasons 4–6)
2014	Blue Bloods	Maya Lawman	Episode: "Insult to Injury"
2014	Friends with Better Lives	Molly James	Episode: "Yummy Mummy"
2018	Liberty Crossing	Carly Ambrose	Main role
2018	False Profits	Hilary Jenkle	Unaired television pilot
2019	Dollface	Ramona	Guest role; 3 episodes
2021	Mythic Quest	A.E. Goldsmith / Ginny	Guest role; 2 episodes
2022	The Woman in the House Across the Street from the Girl in the Window	Lisa Maines / Chastity Linkous	Recurring role
2023	Obliterated	Ava Winters	Main role
TBA	Crazy For You †	Daisy	In production

=== Music videos ===
Year	Title	Artist	Role
2014	"Gentle On My Mind"	The Band Perry	Tatum
2017	"I Could Use a Love Song"	Maren Morris	Shelley

== Awards and nominations ==
Year	Award	Category	Work	Result	Ref.
2010	Daytime Emmy Award	Outstanding Younger Actress in a Drama Series	Days of Our Lives	Nominated	
2012	Daytime Emmy Awards	Outstanding Younger Actress in a Drama Series	Days of Our Lives	Nominated	
2016	Teen Choice Awards	Choice Summer TV Star: Female	Teen Wolf	Won	
2017	Teen Choice Awards	Choice Summer TV Star: Female	Teen Wolf	Nominated	
