= Chris Zylka =

American actor and model (born 1985)

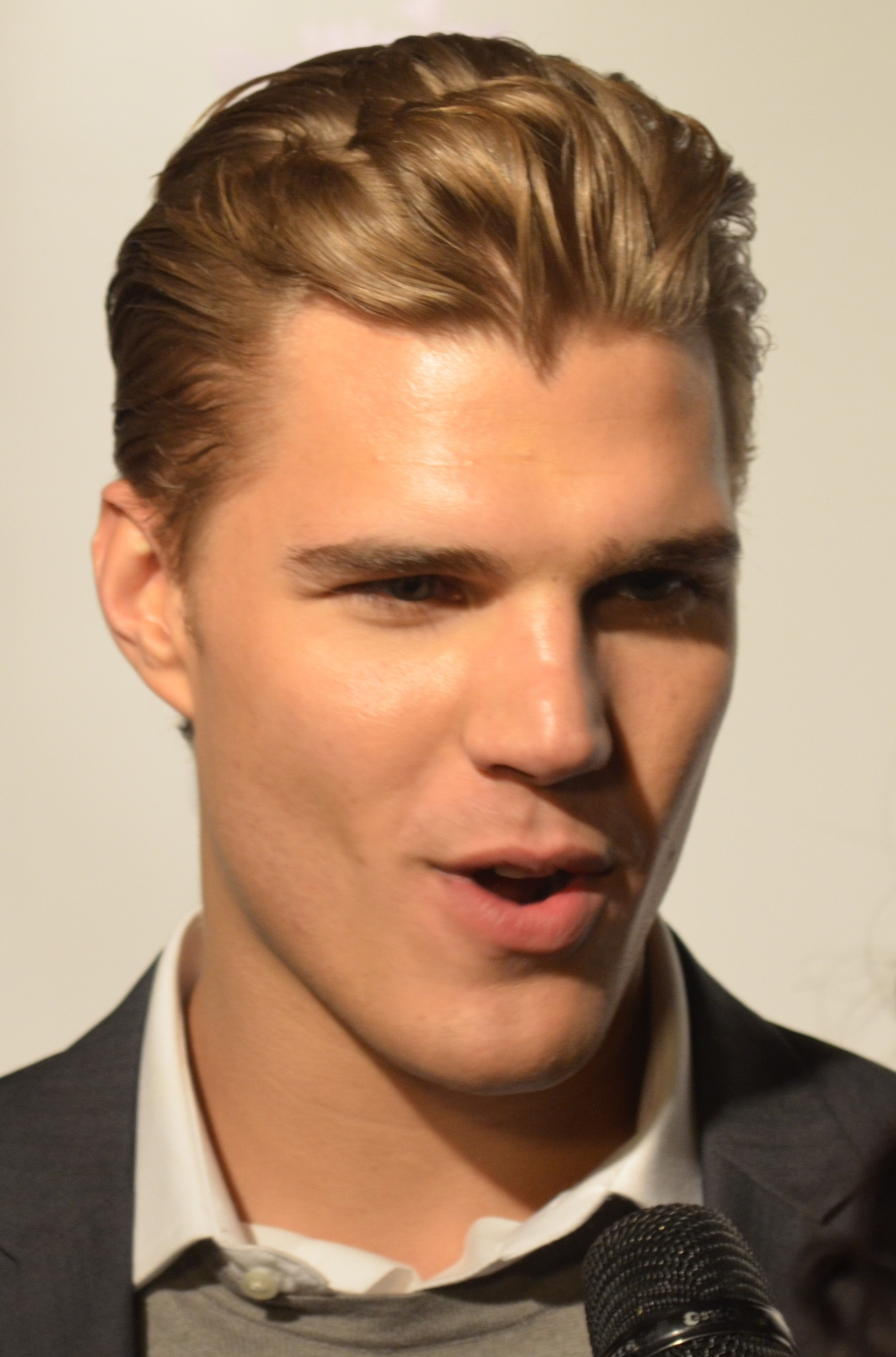
- Zylka in 2011
- Born: Christopher Michael Settlemire; May 9, 1985 (age 41); Howland Township, Ohio, U.S.
- Occupations: Actor, model
- Years active: 2008–present

Chris Zylka (born Christopher Michael Settlemire; May 9, 1985) is an American actor and model, known for his roles as Blake in the film Shark Night (2011), Jake Armstrong in The CW's supernatural series The Secret Circle (2011–2012), Flash Thompson in The Amazing Spider-Man (2012) and Tom Garvey in the HBO series The Leftovers (2014–2017).

== Early life ==
Zylka was born on May 9, 1985, in Howland Township, Ohio. He took his mother's maiden name, Zylka, as a stage name. He graduated from Howland High School in 2003. Zylka studied art at the University of Toledo for two years, but dropped out to care for his maternal grandfather when he suddenly became ill. His grandfather is from Ukraine.

At the age of 19, he relocated to Los Angeles, California to pursue a career in acting. He was homeless for six months upon arriving to Los Angeles and lived in his car in the parking lot of a 7-Eleven in Burbank. Zylka began working at restaurants, where he was discovered by manager and acting coach Jon Simmons.

== Career ==
=== Acting ===
Zylka began his acting career with a guest appearance as Jason on the teen drama television series 90210 in 2008. He was cast in a recurring role in Everybody Hates Chris and had guest roles in television shows Hannah Montana, Cougar Town and Zeke and Luther. In 2009, Zylka landed a 16-episode recurring role as Joey Donner in sitcom 10 Things I Hate About You. Zylka began to move into films around this time, appearing in the comedy film The People I've Slept With (2009) and the horror television film My Super Psycho Sweet 16 (2009). Zylka would later reprise this role in the sequel, My Super Psycho Sweet 16: Part 2 (2010). He portrayed Thor in the mystery comedy film Kaboom (2010), which premiered at the 2010 Cannes Film Festival.

Zylka starred in two animal-attack-themed films, Shark Night (2011) and Piranha 3DD (2012). Zylka portrayed Flash Thompson in the superhero film The Amazing Spider-Man (2012), based on the Marvel Comics and directed by Marc Webb. He played the role of Jake Armstrong in The CW's supernatural drama television series The Secret Circle (2011–2012). He had a leading role as Kermit opposite of Riley Keough in the crime drama film Dixieland (2015), which premiered at the Tribeca Film Festival. The film centers around good-hearted Kermit, who just got out of prison and returns home to Mississippi.

He played Tom Garvey in HBO's supernatural television series The Leftovers from 2014 to 2017. He portrayed Alex Lachan in Lifetime's television film I Killed My BFF (2015). The film is inspired by a true story, the murder of Anne Marie Camp by Jamie Dennis and her husband, Michael Gianakos, in Minnesota in 1997. He played Chuck Harris in the drama film Novitiate (2017), which premiered at the Sundance Film Festival. The film received generally positive reviews from critics and fans. In 2018, he directed Paris Hilton's music video for the song "I Need You". He portrayed Will Jefford Jr. in the drama film The Death & Life of John F. Donovan (2018), released in September 2018 at the Toronto International Film Festival. In April 2019, Zylka was cast in a recurring role as Officer Corporal Kurtz in USA Network's teen drama television series Dare Me (2020). The series follows the lives of competitive high school cheerleaders in a small Midwestern town. In April 2020, USA Network canceled the series after one season. On May 29, 2019, talent agency ICM Partners announced that they signed Zylka. Zylka portrayed Adult Ray in the short film Sorry or What Could Have Been (2020) opposite Paris Hilton.

He portrayed Oliver in the thriller television film Killer Infatuation (2021), which was filmed in Oklahoma City. The title was later changed to "How I Met Your Murderer". He played Thomas in Model House (2024).

=== Modeling ===
Early in his career, Zylka appeared in an advertising campaign for Abercrombie & Fitch, shot by photographer Bruce Weber. He has appeared on the cover of several magazines, including Wonderland, Glamoholic and Bello.

=== Art ===
He launched his first art exhibition titled "Why Use A Name" at Pikes Hotel in Ibiza, Spain in August 2018.

== Personal life ==
In 2012, Zylka dated American actress Lucy Hale for nine months and split in September 2012. He was engaged to model Hanna Beth Merjos in April 2014. The couple called off the engagement and broke up in early 2015. In January 2018, Zylka became engaged to American heiress and media personality Paris Hilton. He proposed to her with a ring worth US$2 million during a vacation in Aspen, after one year of dating. They called off the engagement in November 2018.

He has several tattoos, including a tattoo that says "Mom" in a heart on his arm, "an angel gone bad" and a gorilla.

== Filmography ==
Film
Year	Title	Role	Notes
2009	The People I've Slept With	Mr. Hottie	
2010	Kaboom	Thor	
2011	Shark Night	Blake Hammond	
2012	Piranha 3DD	Kyle	
2012	The Amazing Spider-Man	Eugene "Flash" Thompson	
2014	The Amazing Spider-Man 2	Eugene "Flash" Thompson	Deleted scenes
2015	Freaks of Nature	Chaz Jr.	
2015	Bare	Haden	
2015	Dixieland	Kermit	
2016	Welcome to Willits	Jeremiah	
2017	Novitiate	Chuck Harris	
2018	The Death & Life of John F. Donovan	Will Jefford Jr.	
2024	Model House	Thomas	Also executive producer
2024	Upon Waking	Doctor Pomeranz	

Television
Year	Title	Role	Notes
2008	Everybody Hates Chris	Various characters	3 episodes
2008, 2013	90210	Jason	2 episodes
2009	Hannah Montana	Gabe Lamotti	2 episodes
2009	Cougar Town	BJ	Episode: "Pilot"
2009	My Super Psycho Sweet 16	Brigg Jenner	TV movie
2009–2010	10 Things I Hate About You	Joey Donner	Recurring role, Cast nominated: TV Guide Award for Best Ensemble
2009–2010	Zeke and Luther	Doyce Plunk	3 episodes
2010	My Super Psycho Sweet 16: Part 2	Brigg Jenner	TV movie
2011	Teen Spirit	Nick Ramsey	TV movie
2011–2012	The Secret Circle	Jake Armstrong	Main cast
2012	My Super Psycho Sweet 16: Part 3	Brigg Jenner	TV movie (uncredited)
2013	Twisted	Tyler Lewis	4 episodes
2013	Bloodline	Troy Robbins	TV movie
2014–2017	The Leftovers	Tom Garvey	Main cast
2015	I Killed My BFF	Alex Lachan	TV movie
2019–2020	Dare Me	Corporal Kurtz	Recurring role
2021	Killer Infatuation	Oliver	TV movie (a.k.a. How I Met Your Murderer)
