= Will Brittain =

American actor (born 1990)

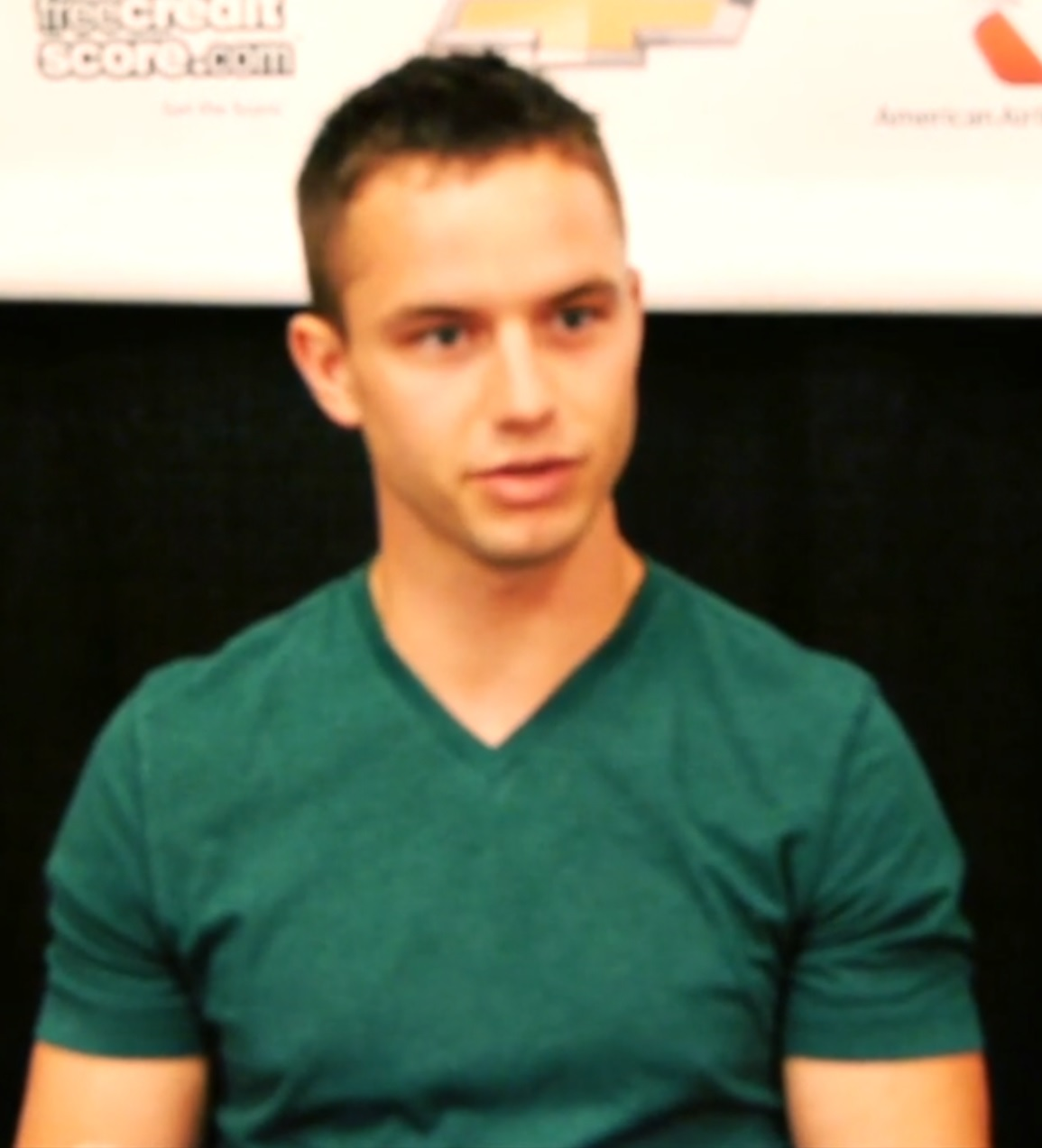
- Brittain interviewed at SXSW in 2013
- Born: August 10, 1990 (age 36); Shreveport, Louisiana, U.S.
- Occupation: Actor
- Years active: 2011–present

William Brittain (born August 10, 1990) is an American actor. He has had roles in the films A Teacher (2013), Lila & Eve (2015), Everybody Wants Some!! (2016), Kong: Skull Island (2017), and Let Him Go (2020).

== Early life and education ==
Brittain was born in Shreveport, Louisiana. He attended University of Texas at Austin in Austin, Texas and completed his graduation.

== Career ==
Brittain began his acting career in 2011, making his debut film in the drama film Big Boy, in which he played the lead role of David Grace. In 2013, Brittain starred in the drama film A Teacher directed by Hannah Fidell, with Lindsay Burdge, where he played the lead role of Eric Tull.

In 2015, Brittain co-starred Glenn Morshower in the drama film by Claude Green titled The Doo Dah Man. On the same year, Brittain appeared in the crime drama film Lila & Eve portraying Bradley. In 2016, Brittain was cast as Billy "Beuter" Autrey in the teen comedy film Everybody Wants Some!! opposite Blake Jenner, Zoey Deutch, Ryan Guzman, Glen Powell and Wyatt Russell, which was premiere at South by Southwest on March 11, 2016, and was theatrically released in the United States on March 30, 2016. Also the same year, Brittain appeared as Agent Hendricks in the thriller film Transpecos.

In 2017, Brittain appeared as Jake in the thriller drama film The Honor Farm, which was released on March 10, 2017, in the South by Southwest Film Festival. That same year, Brittain portrayed Hank Marlow in film Kong: Skull Island. In 2018, Brittain was cast to play the lead role of Billy in the thriller film Desolate. On the same year, Brittain appeared on the third season of the sci-fi drama series Colony, he played the recurring role of Dave O'Neill. Also the same year, Brttain played the role of Jason in the crime-drama film Savage Youth opposite Grace Victoria Cox, Tequan Richmond and Chloë Levine.

In 2019, Brittain co-starred Otmara Marrero, Sydney Sweeney and Sonya Walger in the romantic drama film Clementine as Beau. On the same year, Brittain portrayed as William at age of 18 in the adventure drama film by Tim Disney titled William alongside Maria Dizzia and Waleed Zuaiter, which was released on April 12, 2019. Also the same year, Brittain starred alongside Katie Stevens and Lauryn McClain in the slasher film Haunt. In 2020, Brittain appeared as Donnie Weboy in the neo-Western film Let Him Go.

In 2021, Brittain appeared as Kirk in the dystopian action crime horror film by Everardo Valerio titled The Forever Purge. In 2022, Brittain co-starred alongside Ben Winchell and Aimee Teegarden in the drama film The Road to Galena, which was released in theaters and on demand on July 8, 2022.

In 2023, Brittain was cast in the drama film Wayward, directed and written by Jacquelyn Frohlich.

== Filmography ==
Year	Title	Role	Notes
2011	Big Boy	David Grace	
2013	A Teacher	Eric Tull	
2015	The Doo Dah Man	Jake	
2015	Lila & Eve	Bradley	
2016	Everybody Wants Some!!	Billy Autrey	
2016	Transpecos	Agent Hendricks	
2016–2017	25 & Counting	Zach	4 episodes
2017	Kong: Skull Island	Young Hank Marlow / Marlow's Son	
2017	The Honor Farm	Jake	
2018	The Divorce Party	Nick	
2018	The Long Dumb Road	Dude in Car	
2018	Desolate	Billy	
2018	Savage Youth	Jason	
2018	Colony	Dave O'Neill	4 episodes
2019	Blow the Man Down	Officer Justin Brennan	
2019	Clementine	Beau	
2019	William	William age 18	
2019	Haunt	Nathan	
2020	Let Him Go	Donnie Weboy	
2021	The Forever Purge	Kirk	
2021	Blackout	White Hat / Local #2 / Officer Roger	4 episodes
2022	The Road to Galena	Jack Miller	
2023	Wayward	Frank	
TBD	Hill Country Stories	Danny	Post-production
TBD	My Twin Is Dead	Matthew	Pre-production
