= Bad Hat Harry =

American film and television production company

Bad Hat Harry Productions, Inc.
- Logo used from 2011 to 2019
- Type: Private
- Industry: Film and television production
- Founded: 1994; 32 years ago
- Founder: Bryan Singer
- Headquarters: Los Angeles, California, United States
- Products: Motion pictures Television programs

Bad Hat Harry Productions, Inc. is an American film and television production company founded by filmmaker Bryan Singer in 1994. It has produced films such as The Usual Suspects (1995) and the X-Men film series, as well as television series such as House and Legion.

The company's name comes from a scene in Jaws (1975) in which an elderly man named Harry wears an ill-fitting swimming cap at the beach and teases the film's protagonist Chief Brody for refusing to go in the sea, prompting Brody to retort "that's some bad hat, Harry". The original logo of the company was an animated version of this scene; the second logo, introduced in 2011, is taken from the police lineup scene of the company's first film, The Usual Suspects.

In 2003, the company had signed a first-look deal with 20th Century Fox. In 2004, the company moved to Warner Bros. Pictures after he left Fox due to creative disagreements. He later moved back to Fox after the poor commercial receptions of Superman Returns and Jack the Giant Slayer. In 2006, the company signed a deal with Touchstone Television to develop projects for ABC.

The company is in a suspended state of operation after accusations against Singer of sexual misconduct in 2017. Singer later resurfaced to direct a film, Monument, which was released in 2026.

== Filmography ==
=== Feature films ===
Year	Title	Director	Co-produced with	Budget	Gross (worldwide)
1995	The Usual Suspects	Bryan Singer	Gramercy Pictures; PolyGram Filmed Entertainment; Spelling Films International; Blue Parrot Productions	$6 million	$23 million
1998	Apt Pupil	Bryan Singer	TriStar Pictures; Phoenix Pictures	$14 million	$8.9 million
2000	X-Men	Bryan Singer	20th Century Fox; Marvel Entertainment; The Donners' Company	$75 million	$296 million
2003	X2	Bryan Singer	20th Century Fox; Marvel Entertainment; The Donners' Company	$110 million	$407 million
2006	Superman Returns	Bryan Singer	Warner Bros. Pictures; Legendary Pictures; DC Entertainment; Peters Entertainment	$204 million	$391 million
2008	Valkyrie	Bryan Singer	Metro-Goldwyn-Mayer; United Artists; Cruise/Wagner Productions; Babelsberg Studio	$75 million	$200 million
2009	Trick 'r Treat	Michael Dougherty	Warner Bros. Pictures; Legendary Pictures	$12 million	$13.5 million
2011	X-Men: First Class	Matthew Vaughn	20th Century Fox; Dune Entertainment; Marvel Entertainment; The Donners' Company; Ingenious Media	$140–160 million	$353 million
2013	Jack the Giant Slayer	Bryan Singer	Warner Bros. Pictures; New Line Cinema; Legendary Pictures; Original Film; Big Kid Pictures	$185–200 million	$197 million
2014	X-Men: Days of Future Past	Bryan Singer	20th Century Fox; Marvel Entertainment; The Donners' Company	$200 million	$739 million
2016	X-Men: Apocalypse	Bryan Singer	20th Century Fox; Marvel Entertainment; The Donners' Company; Kinberg Genre	$178 million	$543 million
2019	Dark Phoenix	Simon Kinberg	20th Century Fox; Marvel Entertainment; The Donners' Company; Kinberg Genre; NOTE: Uncredited due to sexual assault allegations made against Singer	$200 million	$252.4 million
2026	Monument	Bryan Singer	Abramorama; Freedom Films		

=== Television series ===
Years active	Title	Creator(s)	Network	Co-produced with
2004–2012	House	David Shore	Fox	Universal Television, Shore Z Productions and Heel and Toe Films
2012–2013	H+: The Digital Series	John Cabrera and Cosimo De Tommaso	YouTube	Warner Premiere Digital and Dolphin Entertainment
2012	Mockingbird Lane	Allan Burns and Chris Hayward	NBC	Universal Television and Living Dead Guy Productions
2014	Black Box	Amy Holden Jones	ABC	Bold Films and Little Chicken Productions
2017	Legion	Noah Hawley	FX	FX Productions, Marvel Television, The Donners' Company, Kinberg Genre and 26 Keys Productions; season 1 only
2017–2019	The Gifted	Matt Nix	Fox	20th Century Fox Television, Marvel Television, The Donners' Company, Kinberg Genre and Flying Glass of Milk Productions

== Critical reception ==
=== Feature films ===
Year	Title	Rotten Tomatoes	Metacritic
1995	The Usual Suspects	88%	77
1998	Apt Pupil	53%	51
2000	X-Men	82%	64
2003	X2	86%	68
2006	Superman Returns	75%	72
2008	Valkyrie	61%	56
2009	Trick 'r Treat	85%	—N/a (2 reviews)
2011	X-Men: First Class	86%	65
2013	Jack the Giant Slayer	52%	51
2014	X-Men: Days of Future Past	91%	74
2016	X-Men: Apocalypse	48%	52
2019	Dark Phoenix	22%	43
