= H+ =

H+ or h+ may refer to:

== Science and technology ==
- Electron hole, h^{+} the conceptual opposite of an electron
- Evolved High Speed Packet Access, H+ mobile phone icon
- Hydron (chemistry), H^{+} a cationic form of atomic hydrogen

== Other ==
- H (S-train), a rail service in Copenhagen, Denmark
- H+: The Digital Series, a science-fiction web series
- H+ (album), a 2018 solo album by Jean-Benoît Dunckel
- Humanity+, an international organisation and magazine that advocates transhumanism
- Transhumanist Party, whose symbol is H+
