= Desolate (film) =

- Directed by: Frederick Cipoletti
- Written by: Frederick Cipoletti; Jonathan Rosenthal
- Produced by: Jordan Foley; Jonathan Rosenthal; Frederick Cipoletti
- Cinematography: Isaac Bauman
- Edited by: John Paul Horstmann; Scott Beatty; Ciacomo Ambrosini
- Music by: Nima Fakhrara
- Production company: Mill House Motion Pictures
- Distributed by: Uncork'd Entertainment
- Release dates: February 2018 (Mammoth Film Festival); July 12, 2019
- Running time: 88 minutes
- Country: United States
- Language: English

Desolate is a 2018 American thriller film directed by Frederick Cipoletti, who wrote it with Jonathan Rosenthal. Will Brittain stars as a young man who is abandoned by his brothers – played by Tyson Ritter, Bill Tangradi, and Rosenthal – after a botched robbery. The film takes place in a near-future dystopia where a years-long drought has caused civilization to effectively collapse in the affected areas.

== Plot ==
A years-long drought causes most people to leave the affected area. Those too poor to leave are left to fend for themselves amid the rising barbarism. After one of his sons dies in an ambush by former family friend Jeb Turner, Duke orders three of his sons—Ned, Kyle, and Parker—to kill the entire Turner family. His youngest son, Billy, stays behind to guard their farm. Turner says their brother's death was an accident while kidnapping his girlfriend, Shelly, to sell to human traffickers. After killing Turner and his family, the brothers find a small cache of money and a map they believe will lead them to more. Duke is enraged to find that Billy has left the farm to visit his girlfriend, Kayla, and has wasted most of their remaining gas. To reinforce his duties to the family, Duke brands Billy. His brothers do nothing to prevent this, furthering Billy's desire to leave with Kayla.

Duke sends all four to get gas from a nearby meth dealer. The dealer manically insists they play Russian roulette, killing himself accidentally. Billy kills the dealer's girlfriend when she comes to investigate with a shotgun. Although Billy is shaken, his brothers treat the situation more matter-of-factly. With enough gas to now travel to one of the locations on Turner's map, they rob a store that operates as a front for the human traffickers. They set free several female slaves but do not find Shelly. As they are leaving with the money, more traffickers arrive and shoot Billy. Ned lies to Kyle and Parker, saying that Billy has died, and they leave him there. Parker dies in a later shootout. Long, a trafficker, sees Billy's brand and realizes he comes from Duke's farm. Long kills Duke and, learning about Kayla, kidnaps her.

Before the traffickers can kill Billy, a man named Van saves him. After performing first aid on Billy, Van questions him, hinting that he may help further if Billy can pay him. Billy reluctantly reveals that his brothers left him for dead and likely have a large sum of money. He offers to give it all to Van in return for helping him to hunt them down. Van agrees but also accepts a bounty on the brothers from the traffickers. After hiding Billy at his house, Van investigates Kayla's kidnapping. Using his connections with the traffickers, Van finds and frees her but is captured shortly afterward by the traffickers' boss, Win. At the same time, Ned buys a sports car, upsetting Kyle, who believes such an extravagant purchase will bring too much attention. Kyle buries the rest of the money as a bargaining chip for his life. Unperturbed, Ned goes in search of prostitutes, finding Shelly forced into sexual slavery. Ned panics and kills her when she causes a scene in her excitement at a potential rescue.

Fleeing from the traffickers, Ned returns to Kyle's hotel room, where Billy has recently arrived. Upon learning that Kyle intends to give the money back to the traffickers, Ned kills him and forces Billy to take him to where Kyle hid it. Billy retrieves a pistol from the hiding spot and kills Ned. Tired of Van's excuses, Long and Win prepare to kill him. Billy kills both traffickers as Van is stabbed. Van denies working for the traffickers and points out that he has rescued Kayla. Although skeptical, Billy agrees to accompany him to her hiding spot. As Billy is reunited with Kayla, Van dies from his wounds, and the first rainfall in years occurs.

== Cast ==
- Will Brittain as Billy
- Callan Mulvey as Van
- Tyson Ritter as Ned
- Bill Tangradi as Kyle
- Jonathan Rosenthal as Parker
- Juston Street as Creed
- Takuya Iba as Long
- Michael Rhys Kan as Win
- Natasha Bassett as Kayla
- James Russo as Duke
- Annie Hamilton as Shelly

== Production ==
Shooting took place in Gilroy, California, during May 2016. The film's setting took inspiration from a drought in California that Cipoletti witnessed.

== Release ==
Desolate had its world premiere in February 2018 at the Mammoth Film Festival. Uncork'd Entertainment released it to theaters on July 12, 2019.

== Reception ==
Metacritic, a review aggregator, scored the film 39/100 based on four reviews, which the site classifies as "generally unfavorable" reviews. John DeFore of The Hollywood Reporter said the film has several plot elements that should work well together, but they end up being underdeveloped. Noel Murray of the Los Angeles Times wrote that "while the story's nothing special, the world of Desolate is memorable". In rating the film 1/5 stars, Rex Reed of The New York Observer called the film "dreary, violent and pointless" except for Brittain. Writing for the Houston Chronicle, Cary Darling called it a "punchy, little, low-budget thriller" that marks Cipoletti as someone to watch.

The film won best director and the audience award at the Mammoth Film Festival.
