= StartUp (TV series) =

American TV Series

- Genre: Crime drama
- Created by: Ben Ketai
- Starring: Adam Brody; Edi Gathegi; Otmara Marrero; Martin Freeman; Ron Perlman; Addison Timlin; Mira Sorvino
- Composers: Chris Hajian; Tristan Clopet
- Country of origin: United States
- Original language: English
- No. of seasons: 3
- No. of episodes: 30

Production
- Executive producers: Ben Ketai; Tom Forman; Shannon Gaulding; Andrew Marcus; Gianni Nunnari; Raymond Ricord; Barry L. Levy; Anne Clements
- Producers: Frances Lausell; Adam Brody; Ron Perlman; Edi Gathegi; Josh Corbin
- Running time: 41–48 minutes
- Production companies: Critical Content; Hollywood Gang Productions; Story Machine; Jacobs Media

Original release
- Network: Crackle
- Release: September 6, 2016 – November 1, 2018

StartUp is an American crime drama television series created by Ben Ketai that premiered on September 6, 2016 on Crackle. It stars Adam Brody, Martin Freeman, Edi Gathegi, Otmara Marrero, Ron Perlman, Mira Sorvino, and Addison Timlin. On November 15, 2017, it was renewed for a third season which was released on November 1, 2018.

== Premise ==
StartUp follows the emergence of GenCoin.

== Cast and characters ==
=== Main ===
- Adam Brody as Nick Talman
- Edi Gathegi as Ronald Dacey
- Otmara Marrero as Izzy Morales
- Martin Freeman as Phil Rask aka "Rasky Boy" (seasons 1–2), Special Agent with the FBI.
- Ron Perlman as Wes Chandler (seasons 2–3)
- Addison Timlin as Mara Chandler (season 3; recurring season 2), Wes' daughter.
- Mira Sorvino as Rebecca Stroud (season 3), an NSA agent who has come to investigate ArakNet, and will do whatever it takes to have ArakNet partner with the government.

=== Recurring ===
- Ashley Hinshaw as Taylor (season 1)
- Lovensky Jean-Baptiste as Jey-Jey (season 1)
- Tony Plana as Mr. Morales, Izzy's father
- Jared Wofford as Frantz (seasons 1–3), Big Ronnie's second in command
- Jenny Gago as Marta Morales (seasons 1–2), Izzy's mother
- Kristen Ariza as Tamara Dacey, Ronald's wife
- Kelvin Harrison Jr. as Touie Dacey (seasons 1–2), Ronald's son
- Kamahl Naiqui as Oskar (season 1) JJ's second in command and Touie's main influence
- Génesis Castro Díaz as Elsie Dacey, Ronald's daughter
- Jocelin Donahue as Maddie Pierce (season 1)
- Wayne Knight as Benny Blush (season 1)
- Aaron Yoo as Alex Bell (seasons 1–2)
- Vera Cherny as Vera (seasons 1–2)
- Joshua Leonard as Rance (season 2)
- Reina Hardesty as Stella Namura (seasons 2–3)
- Tyler Labine as Martin Saginaw (season 3)
- Zachary Knighton as Tucker Saginaw (season 3)
- Allison Dunbar as Kelly (season 3), Wes' longtime friend and trusted lawyer.
- Michael McKiddy as Nico Wexler (seasons 1–2)
- Yeidimar Ramos as Delfia, Izzy's Sister (seasons 1–2)

== Episodes ==
Season	Episodes	Originally released
1	10	September 6, 2016
2	10	September 28, 2017
3	10	November 1, 2018

=== Season 1 (2016) ===
No. overall	No. in season	Title	Directed by	Written by	Original release date
1	1	"Seed Money"	Ben Ketai	Ben Ketai	September 6, 2016
FBI Agent Phil Rask blackmails Miami money launderer Andrew Tallman for illicit funds belonging to dangerous people. Andrew begs his son Nick to move the funds from offshore accounts, but Nick wants nothing to do with his father's schemes. Izzy Morales exhausts her financing options for GenCoin, her cryptocurrency startup, and moves her prototype into her parents' garage. Nick is inspired by Izzy's pitch to his firm, and uses his father's dirty money to personally finance her work. However, as Andrew goes into hiding, Nick receives an intimidating visit by Phil and later by Ronald Dacey, a lieutenant of Little Haiti gang LH7 whose money Andrew was laundering.
2	2	"Ground Floor"	Ben Ketai	Ben Ketai	September 6, 2016
Ronald gives Nick and Izzy 24 hours to get his $300,000 in cash. They race between banks making cash withdrawals, coming up with a little over half. But a drive-by shooting in Little Haiti endangers Ronald's son, Touie, and he decides to become a partner in GenCoin to improve prospects for his family and community. Meanwhile, Phil continues looking for Andrew's money but faces resistance from his colleagues and his frustrations come out after a fender-bender. Special Agent Maddie Pierce arrives from Washington, DC to assist with his investigation.
3	3	"Proof of Concept"	Luis Prieto	Ben Dubash	September 6, 2016
Two weeks earlier, Phil arrested hacker Daewon whose laptop lead to evidence against Andrew. Nick resigns from his job; he and Ronald spend a few days pitching GenCoin to potential investors in their respective worlds but get no takers. Andrew warns Nick to return the money before others come after him; Izzy agrees but notes that Nick now contributes nothing to the startup. Having provoked a gang war, LH7 leader Jey-Jey declares himself the king of Little Haiti and threatens Ronald to stay in line. At his girlfriend's father's golf fundraiser, Nick meets investor Benny Blush. Maddie follows Nick and takes pictures of him meeting with Izzy and Ronald. Phil advises that the commonality between the three people will lead them to Andrew's money.
4	4	"Angel Investor"	Luis Prieto	Scott Gold	September 6, 2016
Maddie gets a lead on the cash withdrawals Nick made; Phil traces them to the accounts Izzy opened and realizes their total matches the sum Andrew was laundering. Phil tasks Daewon with stealing the money from Izzy, offering to return his laptop and clear him of charges. Benny is lukewarm about the GenCoin pitch, but Nick perseveres and closes the deal, gaining a $1.5 million investment. Nick and Izzy go out to celebrate. Maddie visits Phil and they have sex, but Maddie becomes suspicious when Daewon arrives. As Phil struggles to keep Maddie from leaving, Daewon clubs her with a baseball bat. Meanwhile, LH7 buys guns to raid a stash house in Old Town and kill the man who started the violence. Ronald feels they've been led into it and stops Touie from going. When they are ambushed and pinned down in a parking lot, Ronald goes in alone and ends the gunfight.
5	5	"Buyout"	Ben Ketai	Ben Ketai	September 6, 2016
With a legitimate investor in Benny, Nick and Izzy try to buy out Ronald but he refuses. Ronald tries to match Nick's investor by shaking down real estate developer Lance Cherelus for not paying his dues to the gang. Jey-Jey gives Ronald three days to get the gang's money. Daewon hacks Izzy's accounts and steals the $1.8 million despite Izzy and Nick's efforts to stop his hack. Phil keeps a concussed and bloody Maddie in his bathtub; Daewon wants her dead but Phil sends Daewon away with a gun to his head. Phil ends up throttling Maddie to keep her quiet and throws up when he realizes he almost killed her; but she fights him and he ends up killing her.
6	6	"Bootstrapped"	Luis Prieto	Sharon Lennon & Josh Corbin	September 6, 2016
Ronald goes to Nick's home to accept the buyout offer and threatens Nick when he learns the money is gone. Nick is kicked out by his girlfriend Taylor. Ronald later suggests pooling whatever money they have together for an office with interns, so investors will take them seriously. Their first test is Benny, who wants to know who the other investors are and to have his lawyers check their books. Elsewhere, Phil dumps Maddie's body in an alligator-infested canal.
7	7	"Valuation"	Luis Prieto	Josh Corbin	September 6, 2016
Izzy ambushes tech whiz Alex Bell outside competitor RadCoin and invites him to consider investing in GenCoin instead. Jey-Jey and Oskar try to gain Touie's loyalty. Jey-Jey calls Ronald to account for LH7's money, threatens and beats him before the gang. Alex meets with GenCoin, to learn why each of them is personally invested. Ronald arrives beaten and bloody, and tells them what he went through because he believes in the startup. Meanwhile, the FBI is looking for Maddie who has missed scheduled check-ins. Phil arranges to flee the country under a new identity, but finds his offshore accounts have been raided and his credit cards declined.
8	8	"Pro Rata"	Ben Ketai	Josh Corbin	September 6, 2016
Alex offers to fully fund the startup, taking the trio out for dinner then a night at his club. Ronald is suspicious of Russian gangsters with Vera, Alex's business manager, but Nick brushes it off to celebrate with a pair of party girls. The next morning Phil tries to intimidate Nick into providing Alex's banking records, but Nick realizes Phil is looking to blackmail Alex and refuses. Maddie's body is found and Phil tries to go on the run but doesn't have gas money. He confesses the murder to his ex-wife and takes what cash she has in her purse. Jey-Jey instructs Touie to kill his father to make things right, putting a gun in his hand, but Touie instead executes Jey-Jey and Oskar. Fearing retribution, Ronald locks down his household, but he is instead given tribute as LH7's new leader.
9	9	"Hostile Takeover"	Ben Ketai	Scott Gold, Paul Leyden, & Josh Corbin	September 6, 2016
Izzy signs a partnership deal with Alex and a server farm, cutting out Nick and Ronald who never signed a contract. Ronald invites Nick for a family dinner, after which Nick apologizes to Taylor. Phil has dinner with his daughter. Izzy goes to a pre-release cocktail party at Alex's to generate buzz for GenCoin, and talks up Nick and Ronald for their vital contribution to the startup. The next day Izzy finds herself locked out of GenCoin.
10	10	"Recapitalization"	Ben Ketai	Ben Ketai	September 6, 2016
Izzy learns that Alex owns the server farm, and thus two-thirds control of GenCoin's board. Ronald's $300,000 is returned but Vera withholds the agreed 50% bonus for interest and inconvenience. Touie criticizes Ronald for not killing him, and his trauma over killing Jey-Jey and Oskar comes out. Izzy leaves her sister Delfia's wedding reception to see Nick, apologize and explain her situation; they argue and have sex. Phil attempts suicide when he receives a phone call; the trio call him to a meet and play an mp3 Daewon recorded which implicates Phil in Maddie's death. With this leverage and Alex's banking records, they instruct Phil to take Alex down without incriminating them or GenCoin. Phil visits Alex and shakes him down for the cash in his vault but is captured by the Russians and interrogated by Vera. The Russians shoot Delfia in the head in her family home. Izzy and Nick regroup with Ronald in Little Haiti, where Jey-Jey is being buried.

=== Season 2 (2017) ===
No. overall	No. in season	Title	Directed by	Written by	Original release date
11	1	"Disruption"	Olly Blackburn	Ben Ketai	September 28, 2017
As Izzy struggles with the death of her sister and her family's grief, Phil Rask returns, owning the Russian gang who are behind GenCoin as Ronald sees his street trade coming to an end as his neighborhood gentrifies.
12	2	"Bleeding Edge"	Olly Blackburn	Josh Corbin	September 28, 2017
As Nick looks for his father, Izzy, inspired by Ronald's talk with Toie prepares to create a new company.
13	3	"Early Adopters"	Olly Blackburn	Francesca Sloane	September 28, 2017
As Izzy seeks assistance for her brainchild, Araknet, Ronald, seeing the potential helps her out while Nick bids farewell to his father and begins reconnecting with a family friend while Rask who's doing his best to keep the Russians calm struggles.
14	4	"Loss"	Olly Blackburn	Nate Crocker	September 28, 2017
Having made a discouraging discovery, the trio continue ahead with a new plan in time as Izzy also seeks the help of a face from her past while Nick experiences a setback while getting a glimpse into the world of Wes Chandler and Ronald attempts to get his crew behind the new way of doing business.
15	5	"Pivot"	Olly Blackburn	Mac Marshall	September 28, 2017
Ronald faces a decision in the aftermath of a devastating tragedy while Izzy finds herself in danger from the Russians after a brazen plan lands her in trouble while Nick finally gets Wes's attention with the help of Wes's own daughter, Mara.
16	6	"Liabilities"	Ben Ketai	Josh Corbin	September 28, 2017
As Rask makes a move to set things right, Izzy struggling with her near-death experience reaches out to an old friend with Ronald and Nick coming to her defence as they begin reconsidering their business's future while also fearing Araknet's baggage will scare Wes off.
17	7	"Growth Hacking"	Ben Ketai	Ben Ketai	September 28, 2017
As ArakNet struggles to get the upper hand over their competitor, Izzy finds herself butting heads with the team as Rask recovers but his murderous past threatens to resurface with a vengeance while Wes, Mara and Nick battle to bring the company street credit against very slim odds and Ronald ends up going down a dangerous road he'd been hoping to avoid.
18	8	"Opportunity Cost"	Ben Ketai	Leo Sardarian	September 28, 2017
After suggesting a game changing option for Araknet, Ronald struggles to live up to the team's expectations of him, only for things to change when the Russians hit Arknet hard in an underhanded attack, resulting in Nick and Izzy planning revenge.
19	9	"Leverage"	Ben Ketai	Josh Corbin	September 28, 2017
With Araknet celebrating a huge victory, Ronald struggles to get his life back on track before it's too late while the Russians extend a tainted olive breach that causes havoc into the company and has Izzy being thrown into turmoil while as the company prepares to make a controversial move, an unforeseen enemy strikes.
20	10	"Soul Proprietor"	Ben Ketai	Ben Ketai	September 28, 2017
Izzy contacts Rask with a proposal while Tamara gives Ronald the push he needs to change his entire life while Nick makes an awful discovery and Izzy prepares to execute a plan to destroy Araknet's enemies once and for all.

=== Season 3 (2018) ===
No. overall	No. in season	Title	Directed by	Written by	Original release date
21	1	"Rebranding"	Pete Yatska	Pete Yatska	November 1, 2018
22	2	"Sweat Equity"	Andrew Neel	Ticona S. Joy	November 1, 2018
23	3	"Guerilla"	Andrew Neel	Alejandra López	November 1, 2018
24	4	"Depreciation"	Andrew Neel	Josh Corbin	November 1, 2018
25	5	"Diversification"	Timothy A. Burton	Barry L. Levy	November 1, 2018
26	6	"Authentication"	Timothy A. Burton	Josh Corbin	November 1, 2018
27	7	"Limited Liability"	Ben Ketai	Ben Ketai	November 1, 2018
28	8	"Profit and Loss"	Ben Ketai	Ben Ketai	November 1, 2018
29	9	"Questionable Costs"	Ben Ketai	Barry L. Levy	November 1, 2018
30	10	"Trading Up"	Ben Ketai	Ben Ketai	November 1, 2018

== Production ==
=== Development ===
On January 27, 2016, Crackle announced it had given the production a series order for a first season consisting of ten episodes. It was reported that executive producers were set to include Ben Ketai, Tom Forman, Andrew Marcus, Ray Ricord, Gianni Nunnari, and Shannon Gaulding. Ketai was also expected to serve as a writer and director on the series. Producers were announced to include Adam Brody and Anne Clements. Production companies involved with the series include Critical Content and Hollywood Gang Productions. On January 13, 2017, Crackle announced that they had renewed the series for a second season. On November 15, 2017, Crackle officially renewed the series for a third season. On August 27, 2018, it was announced the third season would premiere on November 1, 2018.

=== Casting ===
Simultaneously alongside the initial series order announcement, it was confirmed that the series would star Martin Freeman, Adam Brody, Edi Gathegi, and Otmara Marrero. That same day, it was reported that Jocelin Donahue had been cast in a recurring role. On March 17, 2016, Ashley Hinshaw joined the show in a starring role. On April 19, 2017, it was announced that Ron Perlman and Addison Timlin had joined the series' main cast. On January 14, 2018, it was reported that Mira Sorvino would appear in the third season in a guest starring role. On February 7, 2018, it was announced that Allison Dunbar joined the series in recurring role. The show was cast by Bonnie Wu, Dylann Brander, Erica Johnson and Aaron Griffith.

=== Filming ===
Principal photography for season one began during the week of January 25, 2016, in San Juan, Puerto Rico.

== Release ==
=== Marketing ===
On July 27, 2016, Crackle released the first official trailer for the series. On August 7, 2017, Crackle released a trailer for the second season. On August 7, 2018, Crackle released a trailer for the third season.

The series began streaming on Netflix on May 4, 2021. Since being released on Netflix, the show earned a place in the Netflix Top 10. This generated buzz about whether or not there would be a season four, with speculation that Netflix could potentially pick it up in order to film the next season.

=== Premiere ===
On September 21, 2018, the series held the world premiere of its third season during the second annual Tribeca TV Festival in New York City. Following a screening, a conversation was held featuring members of the cast and crew including director Ben Ketai and actors Edi Gathegi, Ron Perlman, Adam Brody, and Otmara Marrero.

== Reception ==
The series received mixed reviews from critics. On the review aggregation website Rotten Tomatoes, season 1 of StartUp holds an average approval rating of 36% based on reviews from 14 critics. The website's critical consensus reads, "StartUp is a LetDown." Metacritic, which uses a weighted average, assigned the series a score of 52 out of 100 based on 14 reviews, indicating "mixed or average reviews".
