= The Road to Galena =

- Directed by: Joe Hall
- Written by: Joe Hall
- Produced by: Joe Hall; Eric Bannat
- Starring: Ben Winchell; Will Brittain; Aimee Teegarden; Alisa Allapach; Jay O. Sanders; Jill Hennessy; Margaret Colin; Jennifer Holliday
- Cinematography: Clark Vandergrift
- Edited by: Christopher Cibelli
- Music by: Paco Periago
- Production company: AVA Independent
- Distributed by: Vertical Entertainment
- Release date: July 8, 2022
- Running time: 113 minutes
- Country: United States
- Language: English

The Road to Galena is a 2022 American drama film written and directed by Joe Hall and starring Ben Winchell, Will Brittain, Aimee Teegarden, Alisa Allapach, Jay O. Sanders, Jill Hennessy, Margaret Colin and Jennifer Holliday.

== Plot summary ==
The Road to Galena follows one man’s pursuit of personal fulfillment over traditional success. Cole Baird (Ben Winchell) has everything – a beautiful wife, successful career, large home and membership to an elite country club. Behind the facade is a man trapped by his surroundings and falling behind in the pursuit of his life’s dream. Not strong enough to confront his father’s expectations, he left his true love, his best friend and a fulfilling life in small town America to embark on a legal career – intent, one day, to return. Now the rising star in Washington social circles and the youngest managing partner in the history of a powerhouse D.C. law firm, Cole is given the choice to continue the path of success in a life to which he never aspired or to return to the community that nurtured him.

== Cast ==
- Ben Winchell as Cole Baird
- Will Brittain as Jack Miller
- Aimee Teegarden as Elle Shepard
- Alisa Allapach as Sarah Meyers
- Jay O. Sanders as John Baird
- Jennifer Holliday as Florrie
- Jill Hennessy as Teresa Baird
- Margaret Colin as Margaret Kenney

== Production ==
The Road to Galena traveled its own challenging journey through a global pandemic –finding its voice at a time when the industry had been silenced by COVID-19. Once health protocols had been established and a compliance program confirmed, the crew set out on a six-week, masked, shielded, tested, bubbled and sanitized adventure through Maryland’s Eastern Shore and into the reawakening hustle and bustle of the Nation’s Capital in May 2021.

The cast and crew were housed and fed by the staff at Pecometh Retreat Center, and welcomed warmly by the rural Maryland communities of Chestertown, Galena, Church Hill and the surrounding counties of Kent and Queen Anne. The residents of these communities went to great lengths to provide for and join the sets in a COVID-friendly manner. Having pushed the production from October 2020 to April/May 2021, their greatest obstacle was weather. With the pandemic already putting the independent production to the test, they had little capacity to withstand a wash-out, an all-too-likely event in the mid-Atlantic in spring. Miraculously, in 32 days of shooting, much of which on location and outdoors, they had not a single rain delay. Ultimately, the story of this production was its remarkable team.

== Release ==
The film was released in North America by Vertical Entertainment, theatrically and on demand, on July 8, 2022. Its international release followed, now streaming in Mexico, Brazil, the United Kingdom, Ireland and Japan.

== Festival Honors ==
The Road to Galena won the Grand Prix and Best Director at the Prague Independent Film Festival, Best Director of Season and Best Cinematographer of Season at the Montreal Independent Film Festival, Best Feature Film at the Maryland International Film Festival.

== Reception ==
The film has a 42% on Rotten Tomatoes and 78% Popcorn Meter. Jordan Bond from Film Threat rated it 7/10 saying, "The film is well-made, with beautiful cinematography, very fine acting, and great direction." Another review from the Boston Herald raved, "The kind of film no one makes anymore, but it's a journey you might want to take. Fine cast."
