= Shakina Nayfack =

American actress and transgender activist

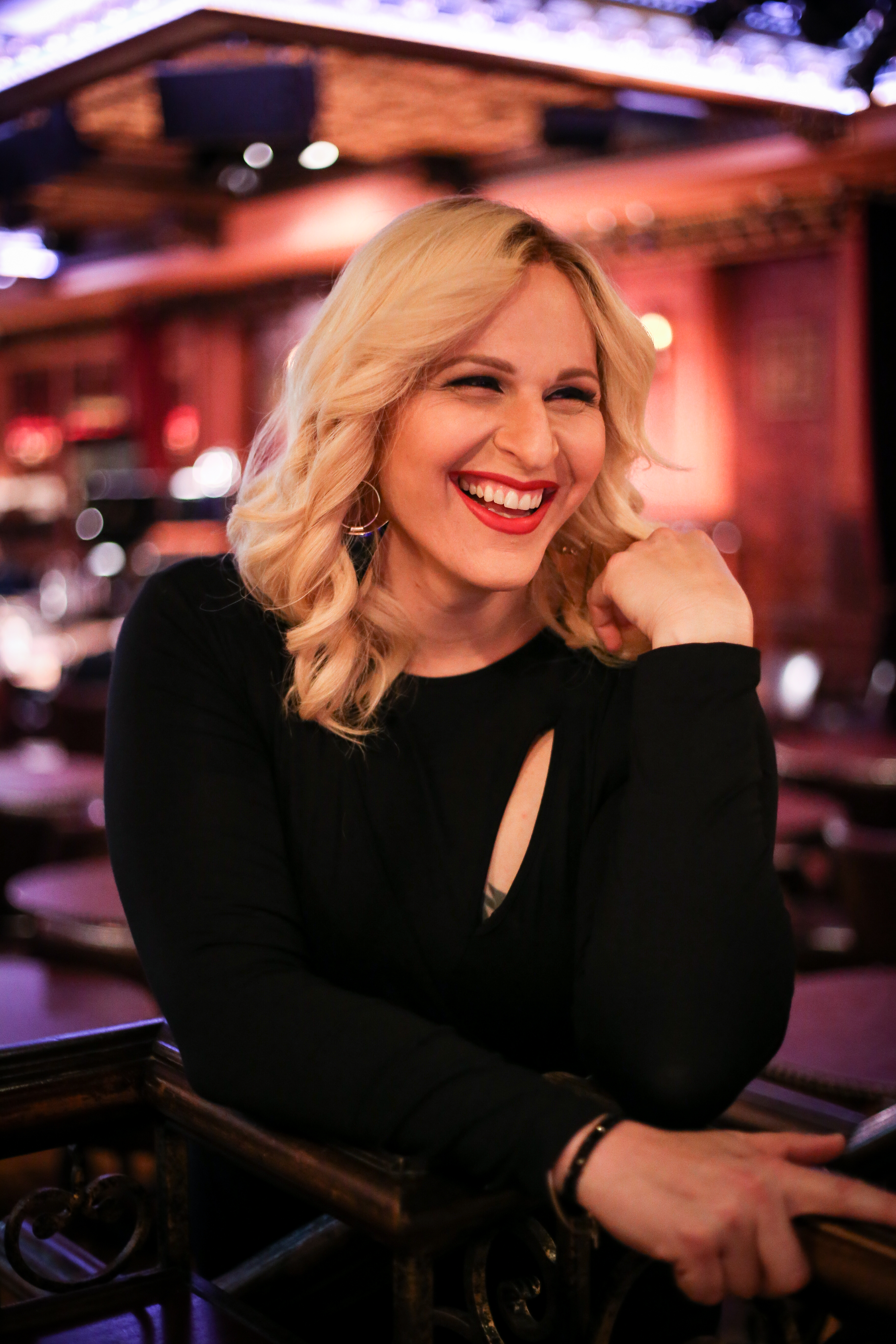
- Born: December 8, 1980 (age 45); Ventura County, California, U.S.
- Education: University of California Santa Cruz (BA); University of California Riverside (MA, PhD)
- Occupations: Actress; activist
- Years active: 2013–present
- Website: shakina.nyc

Shakina Nayfack (born December 8, 1980) is an American actress and transgender activist. She is most notable for her series regular role as Lola, a "trans-truther", on the second and third seasons of the Hulu television program Difficult People, on which she was also a writing consultant. In 2020, she became the first trans person to have a starring role on a major network comedy show, Connecting.

== Education ==
Nayfack attended University of California Santa Cruz where she received a B.A. in Community Studies with a minor in Theater Arts as well as a Graduate Certificate in Theater Arts. She went on to pursue an MFA in Experimental Choreography and Ph.D. in Critical Dance Studies at University of California Riverside.

== Career ==
Nayfack is known both for her work on screen and stage.

=== Screen ===
She previously appeared on the show The Detour, and in the 2014 film Death Drive.

She plays the role of Ava in the 2019 musical finale of Amazon show Transparent, directed by Joey Soloway. Nayfack also served as a writer and producer on the finale.

She is the voice of Hana in the 2019 English dub of Tokyo Godfathers.

She played the role of Ellis in NBC's Connecting... in 2020. This makes her the first trans person to have a starring role on an American network comedy.

=== Stage ===
In 2012, Nayfack was named Associate Producer of the Sydelle and Lee Blatt Performing Arts Center at Barrington Stage where she has previously served as an assistant director.

Nayfack was a founding member and artistic director of New York's Musical Theatre Factory, and her one-woman show Manifest Pussy was highly regarded by the Manhattan theater scene. In 2016, she took Manifest Pussy on tour in North Carolina in response to HB2.

In 2015, she received the Lilly Award, which supports women in the theater and promotes gender parity for theatrical productions, in the "working miracles" category. Nayfack has also received the TRU Humanitarian Award from Theatre Resources Unlimited (2016) and the Beatrice Terry Fellowship Award from the Drama League (2017).

In 2026, her production of Come Back to the 5 & Dime, Jimmy Dean, Jimmy Dean was announced for Classic Stage Company's season.

== Personal life ==
In 2013, Nayfack crowd-funded her gender confirmation surgery through a "Kickstart Her" campaign. She is Jewish. In June 2021 she came out as non-binary and uses she/her pronouns.
