= Max Steel (film) =

2016 film by Stewart Hendler

- Theatrical release poster
- Directed by: Stewart Hendler
- Written by: Christopher L. Yost
- Based on: Max Steel by Mattel
- Produced by: Bill O'Dowd; Julia Pistor
- Starring: Ben Winchell; Maria Bello; Ana Villafañe; Billy Slaughter; Josh Brener; Andy García
- Cinematography: Brett Pawlak
- Edited by: Michael Louis Hill
- Music by: Nathan Lanier
- Production companies: Mattel; Ingenious Media Services Limited; Dolphin Films
- Distributed by: Open Road Films
- Release date: October 14, 2016 (United States)
- Running time: 92 minutes
- Countries: United States; United Kingdom
- Language: English
- Budget: $10 million
- Box office: $6.3 million

Max Steel is a 2016 superhero film based on the eponymous action-figure line by Mattel, which co-produced it with Dolphin Films and Ingenious Media. Open Road Films released the film theatrically on October 14, 2016 in the United States while IM Global handled international sales.

Directed by Stewart Hendler and written by Christopher Yost, the film stars Ben Winchell, Josh Brener, Ana Villafañe, Andy García, Maria Bello, and Billy Slaughter. It chronicles the adventures of teenaged Max McGrath (Winchell) and alien companion Steel (Brener), who combine their powers to form the superhero Max Steel.

Filming began on April 29, 2014, in Wilmington, North Carolina and concluded in late May 2014. Max Steel was panned by critics, who dismissed it as generic, unoriginal and forgettable, while also criticizing the character development, performances, and visual effects. The film was also a box-office bomb, grossing $6.3 million globally and overall against a budget of $10 million.

== Plot ==
Teenager Max McGrath moves with his mother Molly to the town of Copper Canyon, where he was born and where his father Jim McGrath died in a supposed storm. In his first few days at school, he realizes that almost everyone in town knows more about Jim than he does because his mother refuses to talk about Jim's past or death. During dinner with Jim's friend Miles Edwards, Max learns that his father worked for N-TEK, an advanced research company now run by Miles. Concurrently after arriving, Max discovers he emits a unique form of tachyonic energy called TURBO which is powerful enough to overload any electrical item, but he has no control over when he emits it. After sensing an oncoming overload during a date with classmate Sofia whom he has a crush on, Max encounters an amnesiac alien creature named Steel, who symbiotically bonds with Max to absorb the energy.

Finding themselves chased by mysterious men, Max takes Steel to his high school to hide and finds himself opening up emotionally for the first time in his life. Max learns to control and harness his powers, including linking with Steel to form a suit of armor. While linked, Max starts to see his father's life through flashbacks shared with Steel and learns that an alien race called the Ultralinks with the power to manipulate the elements launched an attack on N-TEK. In search of answers, Max goes there to visit Miles, who explains that Jim was working on creating a generator capable of creating an unlimited source of power, and suggests that Jim died in an accident caused by not following safety procedures. Feeling another energy spike, Max finds solace but is soon caught in a powerful storm, which he realizes is an Ultralink. Working together, Max and Steel defeat the Ultralink and, to their shock, find it looks identical to Steel. Another flashback hints that Steel was responsible for Jim's death, causing Max to lash out at Steel and walk away.

Max discovers Molly is missing, borrows Sofia's car, and calls Miles, who reveals he is aware of the Ultralinks and that Molly was kidnapped as a trap for Max at the old N-TEK Facility where Jim died. Max goes to the facility and finds Steel captured, where he has a flashback that shows the truth: Jim McGrath was an alien who naturally generated TURBO, Steel was his partner, and the power generator was a machine designed to harness and focus his natural energy; however, Miles became addicted to infusing the TURBO for the power it gave him, and allied with the Ultralinks to absorb Jim's energy for himself. Jim overloaded the core to stop Miles and, with his final words, told Steel to find and protect Max at all costs.

Miles entraps Max, having created a suit of armor that drains TURBO, seeking to harvest the energy for himself. Learning to use his armored form as Max Steel, Max fights Miles aided by the mysterious men, revealed to be an N-TEK Special Forces Squad who were working for Miles to find Steel, but are now working for Molly (as majority shareholder of the company). Working together, Max and Steel generate so much energy that Miles is unable to absorb it, overloading him in a massive explosion. Molly reveals that after Jim's death, she feared the Ultralinks would come after Max, so she constantly moved until Miles suggested they move back to Copper Canyon in case Max started to emit TURBO. Max apologizes to Sofia for his behavior and makes a date for that night, then goes for a flight in the armor with Steel's assistance.

== Cast ==
- Ben Winchell as Max McGrath
- Maria Bello as Molly McGrath
- Ana Villafañe as Sofia Martinez
- Josh Brener as the voice of Steel
- Billy Slaughter as Agent Murphy
- Andy García as Dr. Miles "Dread" Edwards

In addition, Mike Doyle appears briefly as Jim McGrath, Max's father.

== Production ==
=== Development ===
An early attempt to create a Max Steel film occurred in December 2009 when Paramount Pictures purchased the film rights to the franchise. Taylor Lautner was an early choice for the starring role, although he later dropped out due to commitment to the Stretch Armstrong film. In January 2013, production was suspended when Max Steel was developed into a television series of the same name, airing later that year. In August 2013, plans for a new film adaptation resumed with Mattel partnering with Dolphin Entertainment to fund the film.

In February 2014, Ben Winchell and Ana Villafañe were cast as Max McGrath and Sofia Martinez, respectively. That same month, the press officially confirmed Andy García's casting as Dr. Miles Edwards. In May 2014, Maria Bello and Mike Doyle joined the cast as Molly and Jim McGrath, Max's parents.

=== Filming ===
Principal photography commenced on April 29, 2014, in Wilmington, North Carolina and ended on May 31, 2014.

== Reception ==
=== Box office ===
Max Steel grossed $3.8 million in the United States and Canada and $2.5 million in other countries, for a worldwide total of $6.3 million, against a production budget of $5–10 million.

Max Steel opened on October 14, 2016, alongside The Accountant and Kevin Hart: What Now?, and was expected to gross $5–7 million from 2,034 theaters in its opening weekend. After grossing just $637,795 on its first day the film went on to open to $2.2 million, finishing 11th at the box office. In its second weekend the film grossed $680,104 finishing 17th at the box office, making it a box office bomb.

=== Critical response ===
On Rotten Tomatoes, the film has an approval rating of 0% based on 21 reviews, with an average rating of 2.7/10. The site's critics' consensus states: "Bereft of characterization or even satisfying rock 'em sock 'em, Max Steel feels like futzing with an action figure without any childhood imagination." On Metacritic the film has a weighted average score 22 out of 100, based on reviews from 7 critics, indicating "generally unfavorable reviews". Audiences surveyed by CinemaScore gave the film a grade of "B" on an A+ to F scale.

IGN critic Alex Welch gave the film a score of 4 out of 10, summarizing his review with: "Max Steel is one of the more forgettable and pointless attempts at a superhero franchise in the current post-MCU Hollywood market, lacking any of the originality or vibrance that could give it even a remote shot at a successful future." Variety's Joe Leydon gave a negative review, describing it as: "A half-baked, time-wasting curtain-raiser for a superhero franchise that is never, ever going to happen." Christy Lemire for RogerEbert.com gave half a star out of 4, writing: "For a movie about developing the greatest energy source in the universe, Max Steel is surprisingly bland" and that "a movie based on a toy should be a whole lot more fun than this." The Hollywood Reporter critic Frank Scheck gave an unfavorable review, writing: "Even tweens may find themselves underwhelmed by the new live-action film based on what—for many of them—may be their favorite Mattel action figure. Delivering a bland cinematic origin story which seems calculated to boost Christmas toy sales, Max Steel is a stillborn, would-be franchise starter, sneaked into multiplexes without advance critic screenings."

== Home media ==
Universal Pictures Home Entertainment released Max Steel on Digital HD on January 3, 2017, then released the film on Blu-ray/DVD/Digital HD combo-pack on January 10, 2017.

== See also ==
- List of films based on toys
- List of films based on television programs
- List of American superhero films
- List of teen films
- Max Steel (2000 TV series)
- Max Steel (2013 TV series)
- Max Steel
