= Whisper (film) =

- Theatrical release poster
- Directed by: Stewart Hendler
- Written by: Christopher Borrelli
- Produced by: Paul Brooks; Damon Lee; Walter Hamada
- Starring: Josh Holloway; Sarah Wayne Callies; Blake Woodruff; Joel Edgerton; John Kapelos; Dulé Hill; Michael Rooker
- Cinematography: Dean Cundey
- Edited by: Armen Minasian
- Music by: Jeff Rona
- Production companies: Gold Circle Films; H2F Entertainment; Deacon Entertainment
- Distributed by: Universal Pictures (U.S.); Mandate Pictures (International)
- Release date: November 27, 2007
- Running time: 94 minutes
- Country: United States
- Language: English
- Budget: $12 million
- Box office: $5.2 million

Whisper is a 2007 American horror film directed by Stewart Hendler and starring Josh Holloway, Sarah Wayne Callies, Blake Woodruff, Joel Edgerton, John Kapelos, Dulé Hill and Michael Rooker. It was written by Christopher Borrelli. The plot concerns the kidnapping of a young boy, David, who is more than he appears and brings unexpected troubles for his kidnappers.

== Plot ==
After being released from prison, convicted felon Max Truemont (Josh Holloway) and his fiancée Roxanne (Sarah Wayne Callies), wish to have a fresh start by running a small diner of their own. The bank refuses to loan $50,000 to them to open the business and without alternatives, Max accepts the invitation of his former partner Sydney Braverman. With his associate Vince they are to kidnap eight-year-old David Sandborn (Blake Woodruff), the son of a wealthy woman in New England, under the command of a mysterious mastermind. After the successful abduction of the boy, the group awaits ransom instructions in a secluded hideout. As they begin to become suspicious of each other Max realizes the boy is not as innocent as he seems, commanding various characters to kill each other. It's revealed that the mastermind is David's mother. She tells Max that the boy is a demon, able to "whisper" ideas to weak-minded individuals. She pleads with Max to kill the boy on her behalf. On his refusal she kills herself. Max ultimately kills David, but not before he accidentally kills Roxanne.

== Cast ==
- Josh Holloway as Max Truemont
- Sarah Wayne Callies as Roxanne
- Blake Woodruff as David Sandborn
- Joel Edgerton as Vince Delayo
- John Kapelos as Whitley
- Dulé Hill as Detective Miles
- Michael Rooker as Sydney Braverman
- Teryl Rothery as Ms. Sandborn
- Cory Monteith as Teenage Guy

== Release ==
=== Home media ===
Whisper was released directly-to-DVD in the United States on November 27, 2007. It did receive theatrical releases in various European and Latin American countries between 2007 and 2009.

== Reception ==
=== Box office ===
The film grossed a total of $5,285,197 at the box office across various international countries.
