= Louis Hunter =

Australian actor (born 1993)

- Born: 17 March 1992 (age 34); Sydney, Australia
- Occupation: Actor
- Years active: 2008–present
- Partner: Bella Dayne (2017–present)

Louis Hunter (born 17 March 1992) is an Australian actor.

== Early life ==
Hunter was born in Glebe, one of the central districts of Sydney. He trained in numerous acting and theatre programs as a child and attended a performing arts high school in Sydney.

== Career ==
Hunter began his professional acting career at the age of 16, in 2008, after he secured a leading role as Kyle Mulroney, twin brother of Kirsten (Samara Weaving) in Australian drama series Out of the Blue. He followed this with a role as Prince Edward in a stage production of The War of the Roses for the Sydney Theatre Company, alongside Cate Blanchett. He also appeared as Mercutio in Romeo & Juliet for the Shakespeare Youth Festival.

Hunter made his American debut in supernatural teen drama series The Secret Circle in 2011, playing Nick Armstrong, a member of Cassie Blake’s gang. He appeared in seven episodes, before his character was killed off. He then returned to Australia to work on a play in Sydney called Red Light Winter.

In 2016, Hunter landed a role in 2016 American independent horror film Jack Goes Home, alongside Rory Culkin, Natasha Lyonne and Nikki Reed. That same year, he also began playing the recurring role of Nick Stratos in American family drama series The Fosters, the story of a lesbian couple and their four adopted children. He played the role until 2018. During this time, he appeared in 2017 drama-thriller film The Honor Farm.

Hunter then starred in 2018 BBC One/Netflix historical drama miniseries Troy: Fall of a City, in the lead role of Paris, whose love affair with Helen of Troy (played by Bella Dayne), brought on one of the most notorious military conflicts in history. The series was the most expensive production the BBC has ever made. That same year, Hunter played the role of Lachlan O'Leary in Australian four-part drama miniseries On the Ropes for SBS.

In 2021, Hunter played the part of Josh Lee in British sci-fi thriller series The One, opposite Hannah Ware. From 2025 to 2026, he took on the role of Erato in action drama miniseries Spartacus: House of Ashur.

== Personal life ==
Hunter began dating German actress Bella Dayne after the pair starred together (as Paris and Helen of Troy respectively) in 2018 miniseries Troy: Fall of a City.

== Filmography ==
=== Films ===
Year	Title	Role	Notes	Ref.
2009	The 7th Hunt	Tom	Feature film	
2010	Purgatory	Voice role	Short film	
2011	White Pistol	Himself	Short film	
2012	The Bunker		Short film	
2015	Killing Animals	Ryan	Feature film	
2016	Jimmy	Jimmy	Short film	
2016	Jack Goes Home	Duncan	Feature film	
2017	The Honor Farm	JD	Feature film	
2017	Pick Up	Guy	Short film	
TBA	Greyhound 2	James Pointer	In production	

=== Television ===
Year	Title	Role	Notes	Ref.
2008–2009	Out of the Blue	Kyle Mulroney	Main cast, 40 episodes	
2011–2012	The Secret Circle	Nick Armstrong	7 episodes	
2012	The Woodlies	Seven-Points (voice)	Animated series, 8 episodes	
2014	Red Band Society	Jay	1 episode	
2016–2018	The Fosters	Nick Stratos	Recurring role, 18 episodes	
2018	Troy: Fall of a City	Paris	Lead role, 8 episodes	
2018	On the Ropes	Lachlan O'Leary	4 episodes	
2021	The One	Josh Lee	5 episodes	
2025–2026	Spartacus: House of Ashur	Erato	10 episodes	
2026	The Artful Dodger	Manners	1 episode	

=== Video games ===
Year	Title	Role	Notes
2016	Battlefield 1	Jack Foster (voice)	Video game
2017	Wolfenstein II: The New Colossus	Robert Slaughter (voice)	Video game

== Theatre ==
Year	Title	Role	Notes	Ref.
2009	The War of the Roses	Prince Edward	Wharf Theatre, Sydney with Sydney Theatre Company	
	Romeo & Juliet	Mercutio	Shakespeare Youth Festival	
2011	Red Light Winter		SBW Stables Theatre, Sydney with ImaGen & Griffin Stablemates	
