= Ben Winchell =

American actor

- Born: July 3, 1994 (age 32); Lawrenceville, Georgia
- Occupations: Film and television actor
- Years active: 2010–present
- Notable work: A.N.T. Farm; Max Steel; Teen Spirit

Ben Winchell (born July 3, 1994) is an American film and television actor, known for playing Aiden in the film Teen Spirit and Dixon Ticonderoga in the series A.N.T. Farm. He has played the title role of Max Steel in the live-action film Max Steel.

== Early life ==
Winchell was born in Lawrenceville, Georgia, and grew up in Duluth.

== Career ==
In 2011, Winchell played the role of Aiden in the television film Teen Spirit, which premiered on ABC Family on August 7, 2011. He appeared as Eric in the USA Network's drama series Necessary Roughness.

In 2013, Winchell played Dixon Ticonderoga in the Disney Channel's sitcom A.N.T. Farm.

In 2015, Winchell played Benjamin in the MTV's teen drama series Finding Carter.

Winchell has played the role of Max Steel in the eponymous live-action film opposite Ana Villafañe. Stewart Hendler directed the film and was released in 2016 by Open Road Films.

== Filmography ==
List of acting credits in film and television
Year	Title	Role	Notes
2010	The Pregnancy Pact	Troy	Television film
2010	Making Money	Ethan	Short
2011	Teen Spirit	Aiden	Television film
2011	Mandie and the Forgotten Christmas	Robert	
2011–2012	Necessary Roughness	Eric	TV series; 2 episodes
2012	My Super Psycho Sweet 16: Part 3	Leo Fincher	Television film
2013	The Last of Robin Hood	Jack	
2013	Company Town	Kirk	Television film
2013–2014	A.N.T. Farm	Dixon Ticonderoga	TV series; 3 episodes
2014	The Red Road	Brad	TV series; 2 episodes
2015	Finding Carter	Benjamin "Ben" Wallace	TV series; 11 episodes
2016	Max Steel	Max McGrath / Max Steel	
2017	Feed	Julian	
2017	Law & Order True Crime	Donovan Goodreau	TV series; 4 episodes
2018	Love Daily	Alex	TV series; Episode: Gift from My Ex
2018	Dear You	Man narrating	Short
2020	When the Streetlights Go On	Brad Kirchhoff	TV series; Pilot episode
2020	Academy	4	Short
2022	The Road to Galena	Cole Baird	
