= Difficult People =

2010s American comedy TV series

- Genre: Sitcom
- Created by: Julie Klausner
- Starring: Julie Klausner; Billy Eichner; James Urbaniak; Andrea Martin; Cole Escola; Shakina Nayfack
- Country of origin: United States
- Original language: English
- No. of seasons: 3
- No. of episodes: 28

Production
- Executive producers: Tony Hernandez; Amy Poehler; Scott King; Julie Klausner; Dave Becky
- Producer: Ryan McCormick
- Camera setup: Single-camera
- Running time: 22–29 minutes
- Production companies: Paper Kite Productions; 3 Arts Entertainment; Jax Media; Universal Cable Productions; Hulu Originals; Hulu

Original release
- Network: Hulu
- Release: August 5, 2015 – September 26, 2017

Difficult People is an American comedy television series created by Julie Klausner. Klausner stars alongside Billy Eichner as two struggling and jaded comedians living in New York City; the duo seemingly hate everyone but each other.

The series premiered on August 5, 2015 on Hulu, and was renewed for two additional seasons.

== Cast and characters ==
=== Main ===
- Julie Klausner as Julie Kessler, an aspiring comedian.
- Billy Eichner as Billy Epstein, Julie's best friend and fellow aspiring comedian.
- James Urbaniak as Arthur Tack, Julie's boyfriend.
- Andrea Martin as Marilyn Kessler, Julie's mother.
- Cole Escola as Matthew Ellis Ross (season 2–3, recurring season 1), Billy's co-worker, whom he despises.
- Shakina Nayfack as Lola (season 3, recurring season 2), a co-worker at the cafe where Billy works

=== Recurring ===
- Derrick Baskin and Gabourey Sidibe as Nate and Denise, married co-owners of the cafe where Billy works
- Tracee Chimo as Gaby, Arthur's boss at a PBS station
- Fred Armisen as Garry Epstein, Billy's brother
- Jackie Hoffman as Rucchel Epstein, Garry's wife
- John Cho as Todd, Billy's boyfriend
- Lucy Liu as Veronica Ford, Marilyn's publisher
- William Bogert as Elmer, Matthew's fiancé
- Shannon DeVido as Andrea Mumford

=== Guest ===
- Nate Corddry as Brian Walsh, Julie's high school crush
- Kate McKinnon as Abra Cadouglas, a recovering alcoholic turned magician
- John Benjamin Hickey as Fred, a date of Billy's who turns out to be a "participator"
- Kathy Najimy as Carol Donato, a friend of Marilyn's
- Amy Sedaris as Rita, a salesperson at a sporting goods store; also as a New York City tour guide in a Season 3 episode
- Malina Weissman as Renee Epstein, Billy's niece
- Ana Gasteyer as a woman with damaged eyebrows who Julie and Billy meet at a diner
- Debbie Harry as Kiki, a mysterious woman and roommate/lover of Rita
- Seth Meyers as a conman who hooks up with Billy
- Sandra Bernhard as Lilith Feigenbaum
- John Mulaney as Cecil Jellford, a date of Billy's who turns out to be an "old-timey"
- Nyle DiMarco as Doug, Billy's deaf date
- John Early as Mickey, Doug's interpreter
- Julianne Moore as Sarah Nussbaum
- Stockard Channing as Bonnie, Marilyn's sister
- Vanessa Williams as Trish, Matthew's ex-wife
- Patton Oswalt as Kenny Jurgens
- Jane Krakowski as Lizzie McCormick, Julie's neighbour
- Victor Garber as John Passias, Billy's acting teacher
- John Turturro as Dusty, Marilyn's old flame
- Rosie O'Donnell as Vanessa
- Susan Lucci as Shelley Waxman
- Jessica Walter as Chuck's Mom
- Jami Gertz as David's Wife
- Amy Poehler as Flute, the Doula and Healologist
- Ken Burns as himself
- Luann de Lesseps and Sonja Morgan as themselves
- Tina Fey as herself
- Kathie Lee Gifford as herself
- Tony Hale as himself
- Nathan Lane as himself
- Joel McHale as Billy's trainer
- Method Man as himself
- Lin-Manuel Miranda as himself
- Kate Pierson as herself
- Maury Povich as himself
- Marc Shaiman as himself
- Martin Short as himself
- Larry Wilmore as himself
- Micky Dolenz as himself
- Justin Vivian Bond
- Sally Kellerman as Joan Gentile
- Rachel Dratch
- Andy Cohen
- Mink Stole
- Danny Aiello

== Production ==
In May 2014, it was announced that Billy Eichner and Julie Klausner would star in a pilot for USA Network, with Klausner penning the script and Andrew Fleming directing. Amy Poehler would executive produce under Universal Cable Productions, with Dave Becky also executive producing under his 3 Arts banner, and Michele Armor of Marobru also executive producing. That same month it was announced that Rachel Dratch, Andrea Martin, James Urbaniak, and Tracee Chimo had all been cast in the series, with Martin portraying Klausner's mother. In November 2014, Hulu had acquired the series, with a straight-to-series order. In March 2015, Gabourey Sidibe and Cole Escola were cast in recurring roles.

In March 2017, John Cho joined the cast of the series.

== Episodes ==
| Season | Episodes | Originally aired | |
| Season | Episodes | First aired | Last aired |
|---|---|---|---|
| 1 | 8 | August 5, 2015 | September 16, 2015 |
| 2 | 10 | July 12, 2016 | September 6, 2016 |
| 3 | 10 | August 8, 2017 | September 26, 2017 |

=== Season 1 (2015) ===
| No. overall | No. in season | Title | Directed by | Written by | Original release date |
|---|---|---|---|---|---|
| 1 | 1 | "Library Water" | Andrew Fleming & Jeffrey Walker | Julie Klausner | August 5, 2015 |
Billy and Julie come up with an entrepreneurial scheme to sell bottled library water-fountain water and Julie gets in trouble for a controversial tweet about Blue Ivy and R. Kelly.
| 2 | 2 | "Devil's Three Way" | Jeffrey Walker | Julie Klausner & Scott King | August 5, 2015 |
Julie seeks out an old high-school crush and brings him to bed with her and Arthur. Meanwhile, Billy finds a father figure in Denise's husband, Nate.
| 3 | 3 | "Pledge Week" | Jeffrey Walker | Julie Klausner | August 12, 2015 |
Billy hits it off with a new man, only to find out he is a "participator". Meanwhile, Julie's home-life crumbles as Arthur cracks under the pressure of the PBS pledge drive.
| 4 | 4 | "The Courage of a Soldier" | Jeffrey Walker | Julie Klausner | August 19, 2015 |
Billy visits his very Jewish brother for Yom Kippur dinner and Julie attempts to befriend a veteran to prove to Marilyn's surrogate daughter that she is charitable.
| 5 | 5 | "The Children's Menu" | Jeffrey Walker | Julie Klausner | August 26, 2015 |
While Billy's boss is out of town, Billy and Julie overhaul the café menu with children's cuisine at adult prices.
| 6 | 6 | "Even Later" | Jeffrey Walker | Julie Klausner | September 2, 2015 |
Billy and Julie prepare a portfolio for a writing job, but find it easier to procrastinate than write.
| 7 | 7 | "Premium Membership" | Jeffrey Walker | Julie Klausner | September 9, 2015 |
Billy and Julie decide to create their own podcast, but it proves more difficult than anticipated; Billy has some unexpected fun at the indoor dog park.
| 8 | 8 | "Difficult Christmas" | Jeffrey Walker | Julie Klausner | September 16, 2015 |
Julie and Billy book a gig at The Cutting Room, but Billy's newfound obligation to family threatens to compromise their big break.

=== Season 2 (2016) ===
| No. overall | No. in season | Title | Directed by | Written by | Original release date |
|---|---|---|---|---|---|
| 9 | 1 | "Unplugged" | Jeffrey Walker | Julie Klausner | July 12, 2016 |
Julie tries to fit in with a group of powerful TV writers as Billy attempts to get used to being his rich boyfriend's (John Mulaney) kept man; Marilyn creates a video will.
| 10 | 2 | "Kessler Epstein Foundation" | Jeffrey Walker | Julie Klausner | July 12, 2016 |
Billy and Julie try to create their own version of the ice bucket challenge in hopes of becoming famous.
| 11 | 3 | "Italian Pinata" | Jeffrey Walker | Julie Klausner | July 19, 2016 |
Mistaken perceptions about heritage and sexual orientation leads to Julie and Billy living double lives in New Jersey.
| 12 | 4 | "Blade Stallion" | Neil Daly | Julie Klausner & Scott King | July 26, 2016 |
Time alone become elusive after Julie is caught watching porn and Billy's brother (Fred Armisen) moves in with him.
| 13 | 5 | "Patches" | Jeffrey Walker | Julie Klausner & Scott King | August 2, 2016 |
Problems at Billy's apartment lead to him staying with Marilyn; a misunderstanding results in Julie landing a part on a TV show.
| 14 | 6 | "36 Candles" | Jeffrey Walker | Julie Klausner & Scott King | August 9, 2016 |
As her birthday gets closer, Julie discovers that she enjoys her mom's company when they are drinking; Billy tries to date a guy he met through an app.
| 15 | 7 | "Carter" | Jeffrey Walker | Julie Klausner & Scott King | August 16, 2016 |
Inspired by the success of Hamilton, Billy and Julie want to write and star in their own historical musical. Mother and doctor Marilyn competes with their child for their own TV score.
| 16 | 8 | "Hashtag Cats" | Jeffrey Walker | Julie Klausner & Scott King | August 23, 2016 |
Billy and Julie gain their first famous fan, who tries to help them sell a sketch show to a TV network.
| 17 | 9 | "Cedar Cove" | Jeffrey Walker | Julie Klausner | August 30, 2016 |
When Julie gets sick and Billy is cast in a children's TV show, they jeopardize their chance at becoming fashion elites.
| 18 | 10 | "High Alert" | Jeffrey Walker | Julie Klausner | September 6, 2016 |
Julie writes a personal essay about 9/11 that is optioned for a movie; Billy helps with preparations for Matthew's wedding.

=== Season 3 (2017) ===
| No. overall | No. in season | Title | Directed by | Written by | Original release date |
|---|---|---|---|---|---|
| 19 | 1 | "Passover Bump" | Jeffrey Walker | Julie Klausner | August 8, 2017 |
Julie and Billy get community service after disrupting the CBS live presentation of Bazinga in the Park with George. Julie gets a new meditation app when she is denied antidepressants to survive her family's Passover seder. Billy gets a job as a warmup comic for Larry Wilmore's new show.
| 20 | 2 | "Strike Rat" | Jeffrey Walker | Julie Klausner & Scott King | August 8, 2017 |
Julie gets cast in Woody Allen's new Amazon TV series. Billy and Marilyn get involved in Mike Pence's gay conversion program. Matthew's ex-wife (Vanessa Williams) visits.
| 21 | 3 | "Code Change" | Jeffrey Walker | Julie Klausner & Scott King | August 8, 2017 |
Julie decides she has an addiction to her mother, and treats it by joining AA. Billy helps his sister-in-law Rachel exorcise a Jewish demon from her basement. Arthur experiences frustration in the bedroom and at work, and takes both into his own hands.
| 22 | 4 | "Rabbitversary" | Jeffrey Walker | Julie Klausner & Scott King | August 15, 2017 |
Alone for the weekend, Julie hires a creepy handyman (Chris Elliott) who overstays his welcome. Meanwhile, Billy feuds with an advertising exec (John Cho), and Marilyn gets a book deal from a patient's mother (Lucy Liu).
| 23 | 5 | "Cindarestylox" | Jeffrey Walker | Julie Klausner & Scott King | August 22, 2017 |
Julie gets a sketchy Botox treatment that freezes her face in a smile. She's amazed by how much better people treat her and attempts to exploit that.
| 24 | 6 | "Bernie and Blythe" | Jeffrey Walker | Julie Klausner & Scott King | August 29, 2017 |
Julie and Arthur stumble into sexual roleplay, while Billy worries he’s been miscast as a supportive spouse at Todd’s work parties. Meanwhile, Julie’s dogs become social media stars without Julie’s consent, and Marilyn re-unites with a former lover (John Turturro) from her free-spirited youth.
| 25 | 7 | "Fuzz Buddies" | Jeffrey Walker | Julie Klausner & Scott King | September 5, 2017 |
Lifelong dreams come true when Julie gets hired to write on a TV show, Micky Dolenz answers Billy’s childhood fan letter, and Marilyn throws herself a Bat Mitzvah.
| 26 | 8 | "Criminal Minds" | Jeffrey Walker | Julie Klausner & Scott King | September 12, 2017 |
Julie “Yes And’s” her way into a corner with her former improv teammates and ends up being caught in a significant lie. Billy and Todd can’t fall asleep in the same bed together. Meanwhile, Arthur uncovers a secret at work, and Marilyn and Matthew bond.
| 27 | 9 | "Sweet Tea" | Jeffrey Walker | Julie Klausner & Scott King | September 19, 2017 |
Julie considers trading her showbiz dreams for a life of happy crafting as Billy sickens of New York City. Arthur is over his job, and Marilyn experiences writer’s block. Meanwhile a visit from Lola’s sorority may hold the answer to all of their problems.
| 28 | 10 | "The Silkwood" | Scott King | Julie Klausner | September 26, 2017 |
Billy moves to Los Angeles with Julie's help. Marilyn writes a best-selling memoir, also with Julie's help. Changes at the cafe include a new waiter, and eventually, new ownership. Arthur's office in Florida meets an untimely demise.

== Reception ==
Difficult People received generally positive reviews from critics. Review aggregation website Rotten Tomatoes, gave the first season an 85% approval rating and an average rating of 8 out of 10, sampled from reviews from 20 critics. Seasons two and three both received a 100% from polled critics. The site's consensus reads, "Difficult People makes the unlikable likable with mean-spirited, unhappy characters who still can't help but amuse." On Metacritic, the first season holds a rating of 76 out of 100, based on 12 critics' reviews, implying "generally favorable reviews".

The series frequently leveled jokes about Kevin Spacey prior to public allegations against the actor.

== See also ==
- List of original programs distributed by Hulu
