= Clementine (2019 film) =

2019 film by Lara Gallagher

- Theatrical release poster
- Directed by: Lara Gallagher
- Written by: Lara Gallagher
- Produced by: Aimee Lynn Barenburg; Davis Priestley; Karina Ripper
- Starring: Otmara Marrero; Sydney Sweeney; Will Brittain; Sonya Walger
- Cinematography: Andres Karu
- Edited by: Alexander Morris
- Music by: Katy Jarzebowski
- Production companies: High Pony Pictures; Revery
- Distributed by: Oscilloscope
- Release dates: April 27, 2019 (Tribeca); May 8, 2020 (United States)
- Running time: 90 minutes
- Country: United States
- Language: English

Clementine is a 2019 American romantic drama film written and directed by Lara Gallagher. It stars Otmara Marrero, Sydney Sweeney, Will Brittain and Sonya Walger.

The film had its world premiere at the Tribeca Film Festival on April 27, 2019. It was released on May 8, 2020, to virtual cinemas, by Oscilloscope because of the COVID-19 pandemic.

== Plot ==
Karen, reeling from the end of a relationship, seeks refuge in her ex's lake house and meets Lana, a provocative young woman with whom she explores a complicated new relationship.

== Cast ==
- Otmara Marrero as Karen
- Sydney Sweeney as Lana
- Will Brittain as Beau
- Sonya Walger as D.

== Production ==
The film's cast and writer-director Lara Gallagher were announced for the project in October 2017, along with producers Aimee Lynn Barneburg, Karina Ripper, and Davis Priestley; with Kim Bailey and Isabel Marden serving as executive producers. Filming took place in Portland, Oregon.

== Release ==
The film had its world premiere at the Tribeca Film Festival on April 27, 2019. Shortly after, Oscilloscope acquired U.S. distribution rights to the film and it was scheduled to be released on May 8, 2020.

== Critical response ==
On review aggregation website Rotten Tomatoes 64% of 50 reviews compiled are positive, with an average rating of 6.1/10. The site's critical consensus reads: "Clementine struggles to engage as an erotic thriller, but is often held together by the well-acted friendship at its core." On Metacritic, the film has a score of 55 out of 100, based on 12 critics' reviews, indicating "mixed or average" reviews. The film received mostly positive reviews from critics, who praised Sweeney and Marrero's chemistry and Gallagher's direction, but criticized the script.
