= The Honor Farm =

Drama and thriller film

- Directed by: Karen Skloss
- Cinematography: Matthias Grunsky
- Edited by: Mike Saenz
- Music by: Graham Reynolds
- Production companies: Arts+Labor; The Folding Animals
- Distributed by: GatebreakR (world)
- Release date: 10 March 2017 (United States)
- Running time: 74 minutes
- Country: United States
- Language: English

The Honor Farm is a drama and thriller film directed by Karen Skloss. It was released on March 10, 2017 in the South by Southwest Film Festival.

== Synopsis ==
After the prom, Lucy decides to join a group of young misfits to go to a psychedelic party on a haunted farm, where strange events are witnessed.

== Cast ==
- Olivia Applegate as Lucy
- Louis Hunter as JD
- Dora Madison as Laila
- Liam Aiken as Sinclair
- Katie Folger as Annie
- Michael Eric Reid as Jesse
- Mackenzie Astin as Dr. Meyer
- Christina Parrish as Zoe
- Josephine McAdam as Shanti
- Jonny Mars as Roosevelt
- Will Brittain as Jacob
- Samuel Davis as Sheldon

== Reception ==
On the review aggregator website Rotten Tomatoes, 67% of 6 critics' reviews are positive.

In his review for ScreenAnarchy, J Hurtado writing that "the combination of non-linear story-telling, interminable dream sequences, and fractured reality make the film very hard to connect with."
