= Connecting =

American comedy television series

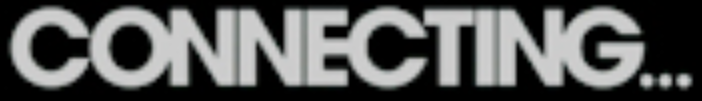
- Genre: Sitcom
- Created by: Martin Gero; Brendan Gall
- Starring: Otmara Marrero; Parvesh Cheena; Keith Powell; Jill Knox; Shakina Nayfack; Ely Henry; Preacher Lawson
- Country of origin: United States
- Original language: English
- No. of episodes: 8

Production
- Executive producers: Martin Gero; Brendan Gall; Linda Mendoza
- Camera setup: Single-camera
- Production companies: Wide Awake Productions; Quinn's House; Universal Television

Original release
- Network: NBC
- Release: October 8 – October 29, 2020
- Network: Peacock
- Release: November 5 – November 16, 2020

Connecting... is an American television sitcom co-created and co-executive produced by Martin Gero and Brendan Gall for Universal Television. The series aired from October 8 to October 29, 2020, on NBC.

In November 2020, the series was canceled after four episodes. The remaining episodes were released on NBC.com and Peacock shortly after.

== Premise ==
Set against the backdrop of the COVID-19 pandemic in the United States, the series follows the lives of a group of friends who try to stay connected via videotelephony as they navigate through the various nuances of life in a lockdown.

== Cast ==
=== Main ===
- Otmara Marrero as Annie
- Parvesh Cheena as Pradeep
- Keith Powell as Garrett
- Jill Knox as Michelle
- Shakina Nayfack as Ellis
- Ely Henry as Rufus
- Preacher Lawson as Ben

=== Recurring ===
- Cassie Beck as Jazmin
- Loretta Devine as Dayleen
- Alex Landi as Cameron

=== Guest ===
- Constance Marie as Martha
- Tony Plana as Ramona
- Carl Tart as Wendell
- Jaime Cepero as Kirby
- D'Lo as Zach

== Episodes ==
No.	Title	Directed by	Written by	Original air/release date	U.S viewers (millions)
NBC
1	"Pilot"	Martin Gero	Martin Gero & Brendan Gall	October 8, 2020	1.67
We are introduced to a group of friends who struggle to adjust to life during the COVID Pandemic.
2	"Day 30"	Linda Mendoza	Guy Branum	October 15, 2020	2.26
The friends face personal struggles and some revelations strengthen and divide the group.
3	"Day 78"	Martin Gero	Ranada Shepard	October 15, 2020	0.97
Ben tries to think about how to tell Annie how he feels and the group tries to help him.
4	"Day 82"	Linda Mendoza	Rachel Pegram	October 29, 2020	1.15
The group is trying to stay positive despite the ongoing pandemic.
Peacock
5	"Day 90"	Martin Gero	Carl Tart	November 5, 2020	N/A
The group struggles with emotions as the Pandemic continues.
6	"Day 135"	Linda Mendoza	Eddie Mujica & Shirin Najafi	November 12, 2020	N/A
The team continues to forge on despite tensions and emotions as the Pandemic continues.
7	"Day 226"	Linda Mendoza	Teleplay by : Chloe Keenan; Story by : Chloe Keenan & Naomi Iwamoto	November 16, 2020	N/A
Ben tries to get Annie to tell him how she feels.
8	"Day 229"	Martin Gero	Teleplay by : Naomi Iwamoto; Story by : Naomi Iwamoto & Chloe Keenan	November 16, 2020	N/A
The team revels in their happiness after Ben comes to see Annie.

== Production ==
On June 26, 2020, it received a straight-to-series order of 8 episodes by NBC.

The first star to be cast in the series was Otmara Marrero on July 22, 2020, followed by Parvesh Cheena on July 31, 2020. The following month, Keith Powell, Jill Knox, Shakina Nayfack, Ely Henry and Preacher Lawson joined the main cast. Shakina Nayfack's casting made her the first transgender person to have a starring role on a major network comedy production.

On November 2, 2020, NBC canceled the series, amid dwindling viewership, after airing only four episodes and pulled it from the network's schedule, with reruns of Superstore taking its place. The remaining episodes were streamed exclusively on NBC.com and Peacock.

== Release ==
On September 10, 2020, NBC released the first official trailer for the series. On August 27, 2020, it was announced that the series would be replacing Brooklyn Nine-Nine in NBC's previously announced Fall schedule and would premiere on October 1, 2020. On September 24, 2020, the series premiere was pushed by one week to October 8, 2020.

== Reception ==
=== Critical response ===
On Rotten Tomatoes, the series holds an approval rating of 67% with an average rating of 6.33/10, based on 9 reviews. On Metacritic, it has a weighted average score of 65 out of 100, based on 8 critics, indicating "generally favorable reviews".

=== Ratings ===
==== Overall ====
Viewership and ratings per season of Connecting
Season	Timeslot (ET)	Episodes	First aired		Last aired		TV season	Viewership rank	Avg. viewers (millions)	18–49 rank	Avg. 18–49 rating
Season	Timeslot (ET)	Episodes	Date	Viewers (millions)	Date	Viewers (millions)	TV season	Viewership rank	Avg. viewers (millions)	18–49 rank	Avg. 18–49 rating
1	Thursday 8:00 p.m. (1); Thursday 9:00 p.m. (2); Thursday 9:30 p.m. (3); Thursday 8:30 p.m. (4)	4	October 8, 2020	1.67	October 29, 2020	1.15	2020–21	TBD	TBD	TBD	TBD

==== Season 1 ====
Viewership and ratings per episode of Connecting
No.	Title	Air date	Rating (18–49)	Viewers (millions)
1	"Pilot"	October 8, 2020	0.0	1.67
2	"Day 30"	October 15, 2020	0.1	2.26
3	"Day 78"	October 15, 2020	0.2	0.97
4	"Day 82"	October 29, 2020	0.3	1.15
