= Aimeé Teegarden =

American actress

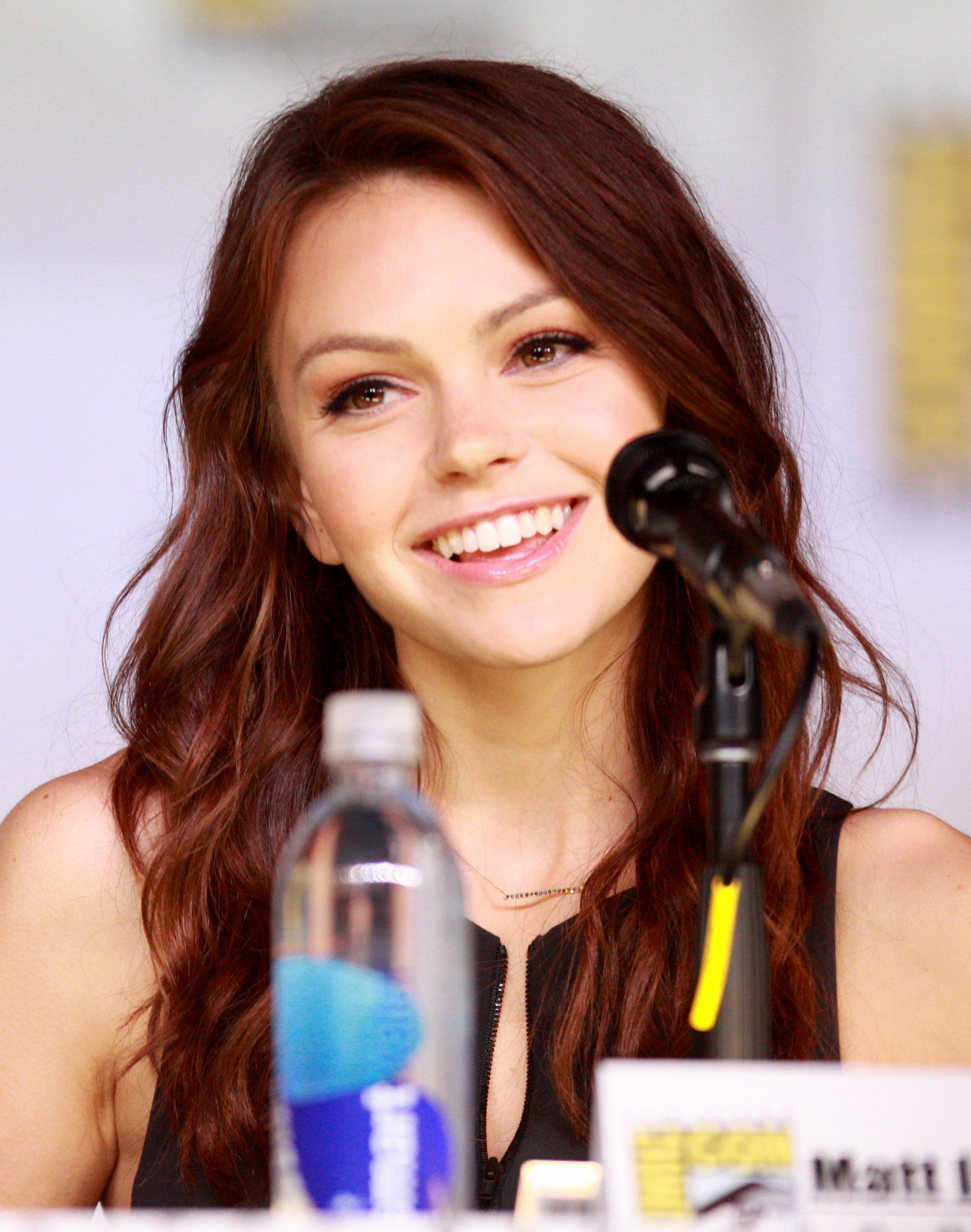
- Teegarden at the 2013 San Diego Comic-Con
- Born: Aimeé Richelle Teegarden; Downey, California, U.S.
- Occupation: Actress
- Years active: 2003–present

Aimeé Richelle Teegarden is an American actress. She starred as Julie Taylor in the NBC drama Friday Night Lights (2006–2011). In 2014, Teegarden starred as Emery Whitehill in The CW's short-lived science fiction romantic drama Star-Crossed.

== Early life ==
Teegarden was born in Downey, California, and grew up in the Los Angeles area. Her father worked a regular full-time job as an engineer and her mother was a dental hygienist. She has a brother named Sean. Through independent study, she graduated from high school at 16.

During her youth, she was a Girl Scout and played baseball and soccer She took acting classes, where an agent discovered her. She then signed with Innovative Artists for representation. She started working professionally at ten years old and did background work to help pay for her own audition gas money.

== Career ==
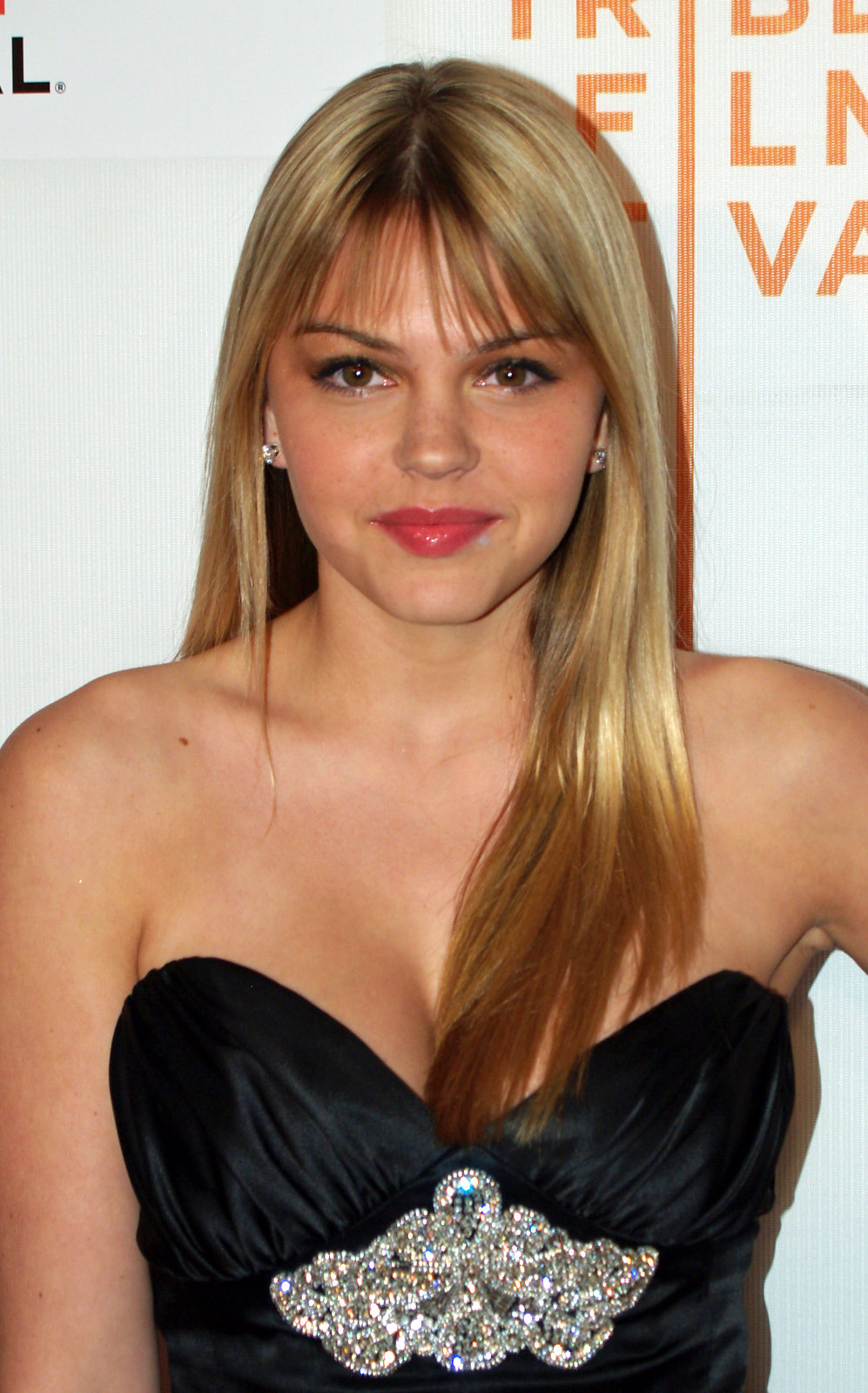
Teegarden at the premiere of Redbelt at the 2008 Tribeca Film Festival.

Teegarden has modeled for campaigns including Alltel, Hollister, Old Navy, Tommy Hilfiger, and YMI Jeans. She has made several television appearances including Cold Case, Ned's Declassified School Survival Guide, and Disney Channel's Hannah Montana.

Teegarden joined the cast of the NBC drama Friday Night Lights, opposite Kyle Chandler and Connie Britton, as Julie Taylor, the elder daughter of Eric Taylor (Chandler), a high-school head football coach, and Tami Taylor (Britton), a high-school guidance counselor. The show ran for five seasons from October 3, 2006, to February 9, 2011. Upon booking the role of Julie, Teegarden moved to Austin and moved back to Los Angeles when the show ended.

On August 24, 2007, during the Miss Teen USA 2007 pageant, Teegarden posed the question ("Recent polls have shown a fifth of Americans can't locate the U.S. on a world map. Why do you think this is?") that led to an infamous reply by contestant Caitlin Upton.

In 2009, Teegarden guest-starred in three episodes of The CW's 90210 as Rhonda, a West Beverly student who crosses paths with Ethan Ward. During the time, Teegarden guest-starred on Legend of the Seeker, portraying a teenage girl who just found out she was a confessor, and later appeared in episodes of CSI: Miami and CSI: Crime Scene Investigation.

In 2010, it was reported she had been cast to star as Amanda Miles in the Warner Premiere and Dolphin Entertainment action comedy web series, Aim High with Jackson Rathbone. The show discusses Facebook being the first "social series" ever created and premiered on October 18, 2011. It returned for a second season on December 9, 2013, on Crackle.

In 2011, Teegarden co-starred in Wes Craven's Scream 4, as horror loving high schooler, Jenny Randall featuring in the opening scene. Also in 2011, Teegarden starred opposite Thomas McDonell in the Disney film Prom as Nova Prescott, an overachieving high school senior, bound for Georgetown University after graduation, trying to put together the prom while dealing with love, heartbreak, and pressure from her parents, and falling in love with the school bad boy Jesse Richter (McDonnell). In May 2011, she was named "TV Actress of the Year" by Young Hollywood Awards for her work on Friday Night Lights. In June 2011, she signed on to co-star in the war drama Love and Honor, with Liam Hemsworth and Teresa Palmer. Teegarden also played Abby in Beneath the Darkness.

In February 2012, Teegarden was cast as America Singer in The CW pilot The Selection. However, the pilot was not picked up to air in the fall. It was reworked and expected to be picked up for a midseason replacement or the following season and the second pilot was filmed, but it was also passed by the network.

In 2014, Teegarden starred as Emery Whitehill in The CW science fiction romantic drama Star-Crossed which ran for one season. In 2017, she co-starred in F. Javier Gutiérrez's horror film Rings.

In April 2022, Teegarden signed a multi-picture contract with Crown Media Family Networks.

== Personal life ==
Teegarden was a member of Job's Daughters International and is a Past Honored Queen of Bethel No. 244 in Downey, California. In 2008 she was awarded "Honorary International Sweetheart of DeMolay International", a young men's group associated with Job's Daughters. She supports Oceana, a non-profit ocean advocacy group.

== Filmography ==
=== Film ===
Year	Title	Role	Notes
2005	Sailing for Madagascar	Bette Warren	Short film
2009	The Perfect Age of Rock 'n' Roll	Annie Genson	
2009	Call of the Wild	Tracy	
2009	For Sale by Owner	Elenore Dare	
2011	Scream 4	Jenny Randall	
2011	Prom	Nova Prescott	
2011	Beneath the Darkness	Abby	Also associate producer
2012	Beautiful Wave	Nicole Davenport	Direct-to-video film; also associate producer
2012	Strain	—N/a	Short film, also associate producer
2013	Love and Honor	Juniper / Jane	
2016	Bakery in Brooklyn	Vivien	Also co-producer
2017	Rings	Skye Johnston	
2017	A Change of Heart	Josie	
2020	Guest House	Sarah Masters	
2022	The Road to Galena	Elle Shepard	

=== Television ===
Year	Title	Role	Notes
2003	Cold Case	Tina Bayes (1990)	Episode: "Churchgoing People"
2006	Hannah Montana	Melissa	Episode: "You're So Vain, You Probably Think This Zit is About You"
2006–2011	Friday Night Lights	Julie Taylor	Main role
2007	Ned's Declassified School Survival Guide	Girl #2 [Sasha]	Episode: "Boys & Girls"
2009	90210	Rhonda Kimble	3 episodes
2009	CSI: Miami	Brianna Faber	Episode: "Divorce Party"
2009	Legend of the Seeker	Annabelle	Episode: "Touched"
2010	CSI: Crime Scene Investigation	Molly Sinclair	Episode: "World's End"
2011–2013	Aim High	Amanda Miles	Web series; main role
2012	The Selection	America Singer	Unsold TV pilot (The CW)
2012	Punk'd	Herself	Episode: "Kellan Lutz"
2013	Call Me Crazy: A Five Film	Olivia	Television film; segment: "Grace"
2014	Star-Crossed	Emery Whitehill	Main role
2016–2017	The Ranch	Nikki	4 episodes
2016	Notorious	Ella Benjamin	Main role
2018	Once Upon a Christmas Miracle	Heather	Hallmark Television film
2019	Robot Chicken	Smurfette	Voice role; episode: "Spike Fraser in: Should I Happen to Back Into a Horse"
2021	A New Year's Resolution	Kelly Leone	Hallmark Television film
2021	The Rookie	Rita Cassie	Episode: "Amber"
2021	My Christmas Family Tree	Vanessa Hall	Hallmark Television film
2022	Heart of the Matter	Andie Hodges	Hallmark Television film
2022	Autumn in the City	Piper	Hallmark Television film
2022	Christmas Class Reunion	Elle	Hallmark Television film
2024	An Easter Bloom	Amanda	Hallmark Television film
2025	Celebrity Weakest Link	Herself / Contestant	Episode: "High School Reunion"
2026	9-1-1	Alex Doyle	3 episodes
2026	Love Finds You	Alexandra "Alex" Brown	Hallmark Television film

=== Music videos ===
Year	Title	Artist(s)	Role	Ref.
2008	"Without You"	Hinder	The Girl	
2009	"Kelsey"	Metro Station	Kelsey	
2011	"Your Surrender" (Prom version)	Neon Trees	Nova Prescott	
2011	"All Better Now"	Herself	Amanda Miles	
2012	"TV Moms"	Ladies of Rap	Courtney	
2013	"Made in the USA"	Demi Lovato	The Girl	

== Awards and nominations ==
Year	Association	Category	Nominated work	Result	Refs
2007	Young Artist Award	Best Performance in a TV Series (Comedy or Drama) – Supporting Young Actress	Friday Night Lights	Nominated	
2011	Young Hollywood Awards	TV Actress of the Year	Friday Night Lights	Won	
