= Jack Goes Home =

- Promotional release poster
- Directed by: Thomas Dekker
- Written by: Thomas Dekker
- Starring: Rory Culkin; Daveigh Chase; Nikki Reed; Britt Robertson; Lin Shaye; Natasha Lyonne; Louis Hunter; Serge Levin
- Music by: Ceiri Torjussen
- Production companies: Yale Productions; SSS Entertainment
- Distributed by: Momentum Pictures
- Release dates: March 14, 2016 (SXSW); October 14, 2016
- Running time: 100 minutes
- Country: United States
- Language: English

Jack Goes Home is a 2016 American independent horror film written and directed by Thomas Dekker and starring Rory Culkin, Daveigh Chase, Nikki Reed, Britt Robertson, Lin Shaye, Natasha Lyonne, Louis Hunter, and Serge Levin. The film premiered at the South by Southwest international film festival and was theatrically released on October 14, 2016.

== Plot ==
After his father is killed in a car crash, Jack (Rory Culkin) travels home to Colorado to help nurse his drug addicted mother (who was also injured in the crash) back to health. He is cursed by his past, and it takes a dark sinister turn when Jack finds a message from his late father, containing a clue that leads him on a mind bending scavenger hunt. There he uncovers long buried secrets and lies within his soul, family, history, his parents, his friends, and his very mind.

== Cast ==
- Rory Culkin as Jack
- Daveigh Chase as Shanda
- Britt Robertson as Cleo
- Lin Shaye as Teresa
- Nikki Reed as Crystal
- Natasha Lyonne as Nancy
- Louis Hunter as Duncan

== Critical response ==
The review aggregator website Rotten Tomatoes reports a critic score of 31% and an audience approval score of 34%.
