= Everybody Wants Some!! (film) =

2016 film by Richard Linklater

- Theatrical release poster
- Directed by: Richard Linklater
- Written by: Richard Linklater
- Produced by: Megan Ellison; Richard Linklater; Ginger Sledge
- Starring: Will Brittain; Zoey Deutch; Ryan Guzman; Tyler Hoechlin; Blake Jenner; J. Quinton Johnson; Glen Powell; Wyatt Russell; Austin Amelio; Temple Baker; Tanner Kalina; Juston Street; Forrest Vickery
- Cinematography: Shane F. Kelly
- Edited by: Sandra Adair
- Production companies: Annapurna Pictures; Detour Filmproduction
- Distributed by: Paramount Pictures
- Release dates: March 11, 2016 (SXSW); March 30, 2016 (United States)
- Running time: 116 minutes
- Country: United States
- Language: English
- Budget: $10 million
- Box office: $5.4 million

Everybody Wants Some!! is a 2016 American comedy film written and directed by Richard Linklater. Starring Blake Jenner, Zoey Deutch, Glen Powell, Ryan Guzman, Tyler Hoechlin, Will Brittain, and Wyatt Russell, it follows the lives of Texan college baseball players in 1980. The script was first completed in 2005, but Linklater struggled to secure funding until Annapurna Pictures got involved. Principal photography took place in and around Austin, Texas between October and December 2014.

Everybody Wants Some!! had its world premiere at South by Southwest on March 11, 2016, and was theatrically released in the United States on March 30, 2016, by Paramount Pictures. The film received positive reviews from critics, with many accrediting the film's acclaim to Linklater's direction and the performances of Jenner, Deutch and Powell.

== Plot ==
In Texas in the fall of 1980, college freshman Jake Bradford, an all-state pitcher in high school, moves into an off-campus house with other members of the college baseball team including his roommate Billy, nicknamed "Beuter" for his Deep Southern accent. He joins Finnegan, Roper, Dale, and Plummer cruising campus by car, looking for women. Upperclassmen Roper and Finnegan both "strike out" with two women, but one of them, Beverly, says she likes Jake; he makes a note of her room number.

At a team meeting in the house, the coach introduces the new players, including freshmen Jake, Plummer, Beuter, Brumley, and transfer students Jay and Willoughby. The coach cites two rules: no alcohol in the house, and no women upstairs. The team quickly disregards the rules and hosts a drunken party during which several players take women up to their bedrooms. The next morning, Beuter leaves temporarily for home, concerned his girlfriend might be pregnant.

The team goes out drinking and "cruising chicks", beginning the night at a local disco. Jay makes arrogant remarks to a bartender, provoking a brawl, and the team is ejected. He goes home, and the rest of the team changes clothes and visits a western-themed bar.

The next day Willoughby shares his marijuana, music, and philosophy with the freshmen. Jake happens upon Justin, a high school teammate who has embraced punk subculture. He invites the team to a punk concert, and with Jake's encouragement, they go. Jake leaves flowers and a note on Beverly's apartment door that night, then attends a massive party at the team's house.

Beverly calls him in the morning and they agree to meet. She says she is a performing arts major; Jake answers only that he is a baseball player, based on Finnegan's advice. At the team's first unofficial practice, Jay upsets his teammates by pitching aggressively. McReynolds, the team's captain and best player, puts Jay in his place by hitting a home run.

The coach arrives unexpectedly and calls Willoughby off the pitcher's mound. It is later revealed that he is 30 and has been fraudulently transferring to new colleges to continue playing ball and enjoy the student lifestyle.

Beverly invites Jake to "Oz", a costume party thrown by performing arts students. He mentions the party to his teammates and tries to tell them they would not enjoy it, but they cajole him into taking them. Although they initially feel out of place, they enjoy themselves all the same. Finnegan is ridiculed by his friends for pretending to be into astrology, and Jake takes part in an improvised Alice in Wonderland–themed take on The Dating Game. He and Beverly spend the rest of the night together.

The next morning, the semester begins and Jake and Beverly walk to class together. Dale and Finnegan razz him for not returning home that night. Jake runs into Plummer in his classroom, and they settle in for their first lecture. Their history professor enters and writes "Frontiers are where you find them" on the chalkboard. As their first college class officially begins, Jake and Plummer fall asleep.

== Cast ==
- Blake Jenner as Jake Bradford
- Zoey Deutch as Beverly
- Glen Powell as Walt "Finn" Finnegan
- Ryan Guzman as Kenny Roper
- Tyler Hoechlin as Glen McReynolds
- Wyatt Russell as Charlie Willoughby
- Will Brittain as Billy "Beuter" Autrey
- Austin Amelio as Nesbit
- Temple Baker as Tyrone Plummer
- Juston Street as Jay Niles
- J. Quinton Johnson as Dale Douglas
- Forrest Vickery as Coma
- Tanner Kalina as Alex Brumley
- Michael Monsour as Justin
- Jonathan Breck as Coach Gordan
- Asjha Cooper as Sharon
- Dora Madison Burge as Val

== Production ==
Linklater wrote the first draft of the film in mid-2005, and tried to finance it in 2009, but could not get production off the ground until Annapurna Pictures became involved.

In August 2014, Linklater ceased involvement on the Warner Bros. film The Incredible Mr. Limpet, saying that he wanted to concentrate on a university-set, 1980s baseball film under the working title That's What I'm Talking About. The project is considered a "spiritual sequel" to Linklater's 1993 film Dazed and Confused, which was set on the last day of high school in 1976. Linklater also considers the film a "spiritual sequel" to Boyhood because "it begins right where Boyhood ends with a guy showing up at college and meeting his new roommates and a girl." The film is based on Linklater's real-life experiences while attending Sam Houston State University in Huntsville, Texas.

In September, Linklater offered Jenner, Hoechlin, Russell, and Guzman roles as members of the baseball team the film focuses on. Hoechlin chose his role over returning to the fifth season of MTV's series Teen Wolf. Later that month, Annapurna Pictures became involved as a financial producer of the film, while Paramount Pictures signed on to handle distribution rights. More cast members were announced, including Deutch, Brittain, and Powell. To create camaraderie among the cast, Linklater had the actors move out to his Austin-area ranch for rehearsals.

Principal photography began on October 13, 2014, in Austin. Filming took place in Weimar, Texas, from October 15 to December 2. Other shooting locations included San Marcos, Texas, Bastrop, Texas, Elgin, Texas and San Antonio. A night shoot involving extras occurred on October 31, 2014, for a costume party scene in Taylor, Texas.

== Soundtrack ==
Everybody Wants Some!!: Music from the Motion Picture

Soundtrack album by various artists
- Released: April 8, 2016
- Recorded: 1977–1980
- Length: 72:53
- Label: Warner Bros. Records

No.	Title	Performer	Length
1.	"My Sharona"	The Knack	4:00
2.	"Heart of Glass"	Blondie	4:11
3.	"Take Your Time (Do It Right)"	The S.O.S. Band	7:40
4.	"Heartbreaker"	Pat Benatar	3:28
5.	"Alternative Ulster"	Stiff Little Fingers	2:43
6.	"Every 1's a Winner"	Hot Chocolate	4:04
7.	"Everybody Wants Some!!"	Van Halen	5:09
8.	"Let's Get Serious"	Jermaine Jackson	7:49
9.	"Pop Muzik"	M	4:55
10.	"Because the Night"	Patti Smith Group	3:23
11.	"I Want You to Want Me (Live)"	Cheap Trick	3:34
12.	"Hand In Hand"	Dire Straits	4:49
13.	"Whip It"	Devo	2:41
14.	"Romeo's Tune"	Steve Forbert	3:32
15.	"Good Times Roll"	The Cars	3:48
16.	"Rapper's Delight"	The Sugarhill Gang	7:07
Total length:			72:53

== Release ==
On July 27, 2015, Paramount Pictures set the film for an April 15, 2016 release in the United States. In February 2016, the film was moved up to April 1, in a limited release. It was then moved to March 30.

The film's debut screening took place at South By Southwest on March 11, 2016. It received another one-time screening at Sam Houston State University, where Linklater himself had gone to college, on March 28, 2016, also featuring a student body Q&A with Linklater, Blake Jenner, Zoey Deutch, and Ryan Guzman. It received its first limited release across 19 locations in New York City, Austin, Houston, and Los Angeles on March 30. On April 22, 2016, Everyone Wants Some!! received its widest release at 454 theaters, peaking at #13 at the box office. By the end of its limited theatrical run, the movie had only brought in $4,644,472, far below its $10 million budget.

== Reception ==
=== Critical response ===
On Rotten Tomatoes, 87% of critics gave the film positive reviews based on 247 reviews, with an average rating of 7.60/10. The site's critical consensus reads, "Nostalgic in the best sense, Everybody Wants Some!! finds Richard Linklater ambling through the past with a talented cast, a sweetly meandering story, and a killer classic rock soundtrack." On Metacritic, the film has a score of 85 out of 100 based on 50 reviews, indicating "universal acclaim". The film grossed $5.4 million against a $10 million budget, making it a box-office bomb, but was critically acclaimed.

Justin Chang of Variety wrote, "After the dramatic one-two punch of 'Before Midnight' and 'Boyhood,' a master of the modern hangout movie achieves his most sustained comic bliss-out in years." Chang added, "Linklater indulges his characters' antics with such wild, free-flowing affection that you might miss the thoughtful undertow of this delightful movie: Few filmmakers have so fully embraced the bittersweet joy of living in the moment — one that's all the more glorious because it fades so soon." Several critics commented on how the film humanizes the archetype of the male jock, or bro-type. In RogerEbert.com, Sheila O'Malley said, "Linklater approaches [his subjects] with affection, and even kindness—one of his distinguishing characteristics. 'Everybody Wants Some!!' is a corrective to the tired, false 'dumb jock' stereotype."

Emily St. James of Vox wrote how the film, along with Dazed and Confused, Boyhood, and the Before Sunrise trilogy, shows how "Linklater is our best living American filmmaker when it comes to the subject of time." She wrote that Linklater demonstrates that "what's important in life aren't the big, dramatic moments or even the major changes. What's important in life is what happens between those moments, when people connect and life is honestly lived."

The cast received praise, with The New Yorker's Anthony Lane singling out Glen Powell for his "runaway charm". Jacob Hall of SlashFilm said, "Everybody Wants Some is powered by testosterone and bromance, but the quiet heart of the movie is Beverly (Zoey Deutch, in a star-making performance) who strikes up a relationship with Jake."

Writing for The Guardian, Peter Bradshaw said the film is "a deceptively subtle comedy, and also a challengingly and almost provokingly unironic film intensifying and cartoonifying what it is like to be young and male, but quite without the obviously readable drama and poignancy of his earlier film Boyhood, that now legendary real-time movie tracking a young man’s growing pains."

A criticism came from Amy Nicholson, who wrote in MTV that Linklater was too far into his career to be featuring female characters in underwritten parts. She added, "Linklater can't resist posturing that there's deep emotional significance in these bros. There could have been, if he'd stepped back from his personal sentimentality and reshaped them to matter to everyone. And the best moments of Everybody Wants Some!! come when they step out of their — and Linklater's — comfort zone and explore beyond the athletic dorms: a country bar, a disco, a punk show."

Dan Solomon of Texas Monthly found the film to be charming and fun, but opined "even the sweetest, most open-hearted of [the guys], as a college ballplayer in small-town Texas in 1980 would be much more problematic than Linklater presented them to be." He contended "the way [Linklater] gets around having to confront the misogyny or homophobia that was a part of the world he decided to depict was basically to not have any gay people in it, or to not give any woman in the movie more than about five minutes of screen time". He concluded, "And since Linklater is the sort of director whose most recent work has been great because it’s so concerned with reality, it’s hard not to feel like this one is a big swing and a miss."

=== Accolades ===
It was nominated as Best Ensemble at the December 19, 2016 Detroit Film Critics Society. It was also nominated for both Best Feature and the Audience Award at the 2016 Gotham Independent Film Awards.

== See also ==
- List of baseball films
