= Haunt (2019 film) =

2019 film by Scott Beck and Bryan Woods

- Theatrical release poster
- Directed by: Scott Beck; Bryan Woods
- Written by: Scott Beck; Bryan Woods
- Produced by: Todd Garner; Mark Fasano; Vishal Rungta; Ankur Rungta; Eli Roth
- Starring: Katie Stevens; Will Brittain; Lauryn McClain
- Cinematography: Ryan Samul
- Edited by: Terel Gibson
- Music by: tomandandy
- Production companies: Sierra Pictures; Broken Road Productions; Nickel City Pictures
- Distributed by: Momentum Pictures
- Release dates: August 8, 2019 (Popcorn Frights Film Festival); September 13, 2019 (United States)
- Running time: 92 minutes
- Country: United States
- Language: English
- Box office: $2.2 million

Haunt is a 2019 American slasher film written and directed by Scott Beck and Bryan Woods. The film stars Katie Stevens, Will Brittain, and Lauryn McClain. Set on a Halloween night, it follows a group of friends who encounter a haunted house that promises to feed on their darkest fears, unknowing that the performers have a murderous intent.

Haunt premiered at Popcorn Frights Film Festival on August 8, 2019, and subsequently had a limited release in the United States on September 13, by Momentum Pictures. The film received positive reviews from critics and grossed $2.4 million worldwide.

== Plot ==
On Halloween night in Carbondale, Illinois, friends Harper, Bailey, Angela, and Mallory attend a party. The group befriends two college students, Evan and Nathan, the latter of whom flirts with Harper. Throughout the night, Harper, who is in an abusive relationship, suspects she is being stalked by a man in a devil mask.

Later that night, the group attends a haunted house attraction. They are met by Clown, who makes them sign liability waivers and place their phones in a lockbox. Upon entering, they are met with a scene where a witch-masked woman burns a screaming girl's face with a hot poker. They reach a maze with two paths, one marked safe the other not safe. The group then becomes divided after Nathan, Angela, and Bailey take the safe route and the remaining take the not safe maze. In one room, Bailey's arm is slashed by a razor. The group, except for Mallory, reunites and panics after seeing the severity of Bailey's injury. Just after realizing that Mallory is missing, they are forced to watch as the Witch buries her poker in Mallory's head.

Nathan leaves to retrieve their phones and is met by a man in a ghost mask, who appears to be a concerned employee named Mitch. Bailey, Harper, Evan, and Angela retrace their steps, eventually leading back to the crawlspace maze, which has a trapdoor in case too many people go at once. Evan goes first, followed by Mitch, who then seals Nathan inside the crawlspace maze. Devil suddenly appears and kills Angela. While fleeing, Bailey accidentally activates the trapdoor, dropping Nathan into the house's operation rooms. Evan escapes with Mitch, who removes his mask, revealing a heavily modified face before killing him.

Nathan retrieves Harper's phone and texts their location to her abusive boyfriend Sam before escaping the house. Harper barricades herself in an escape room that resembles a child's bedroom, which triggers childhood memories of hiding under the bed from her abusive father. Harper uses a compact mirror to read multiple clues, written backwards on the wall, that direct her to find a key to open a door marked "The End". After she finally retrieves the key from a jack-in-the-box toy from under the bed, Devil forces his way into the room, but Harper stabs him in the eye with the key. When she then uses the key to open The End door, it triggers a shotgun to fire, hitting her in the shoulder. She crawls through a corridor to another door but is pursued by Devil. Realizing the gunshots are timed to the jack-in-the-box theme, Harper pushes Devil's head up just as the gun fires, killing him. Retrieving Devil's pitchfork, Harper fatally stabs someone dressed as a clown with a skull mask, only to learn after that it was a gagged Bailey.

Sam arrives but is quickly dispatched by Clown. Harper incapacitates Zombie before helping Nathan kill Mitch. They encounter Vampire, who removes his mask, revealing an unmodified face. Vampire explains that the haunt's performers are part of an extreme body modification group that creates haunted house attractions to kill people. Vampire is shot to death by Zombie. Nathan and Harper kill Witch and Zombie then escape in Sam's truck. Clown burns down the attraction. At the hospital, Harper realizes that the group had filled out the liability waivers with their personal information, including their home addresses.

Some time later, Clown arrives at Harper's mother's house. He gets stuck in a trap set by Harper, who emerges with a shotgun and shoots him.

== Cast ==
- Katie Stevens as Harper
- Will Brittain as Nathan
- Lauryn McClain as Bailey
- Andrew Caldwell as Evan
- Shazi Raja as Angela
- Schuyler Helford as Mallory
- Chaney Morrow as Ghost
- Justin Marxen as Clown
- Terri Partyka as Witch
- Justin Rose as Vampire
- Damian Maffei as Devil
- Schuyler White as Zombie
- Samuel Hunt as Sam

== Production ==
In July 2017, it was announced Scott Beck and Bryan Woods would write and direct the film. The film would be produced by Eli Roth, Todd Garner, Mark Fasano, Ankur Rungta, Vishal Rungta and executive produced by Nick Meyer, Marc Schaberg, Josie Liang, Jeremy Stein and Tobias Weymar. In October 2017, Katie Stevens, Will Brittain, Lauryn McClain, Andrew Caldwell, and Shazi Raja joined the cast of the film.

Principal photography began in October 2017 in Covington, Kentucky. Production concluded in November 2017.

== Release ==
Haunt had its world premiere at Popcorn Frights Film Festival on August 8, 2019, in Fort Lauderdale, Florida, and its international premiere at FrightFest in London, England, on August 23, 2019. The Los Angeles premiere for Haunt took place at the Grauman's Egyptian Theatre on September 7, 2019. The film received a limited release in the United States on September 13, 2019, by Momentum Pictures. Haunt later premiered on Shudder, where it was ranked the number-one most watched film premiere of 2019.

=== Critical response ===
On the review aggregator website Rotten Tomatoes, the film holds an approval rating of 71% based on 49 reviews, with an average rating of 6.3/10. The website's critics consensus reads: "Haunt is spooked by the spirits of its obvious influences, but still packs enough thrills and chills to satisfy horror fans up for a haunted house excursion." Metacritic, which uses a weighted average, assigned the film a score of 69 out of 100, based on five critics, indicating "generally favorable" reviews. Albert Nowicki included the film on his list of "best Halloween movies of all time" for Prime Movies.

== See also ==
- List of films set around Halloween
