= H+: The Digital Series =

- Genre: Science fiction Post-apocalyptic; Postcyberpunk
- Created by: John Cabrera; Cosimo De Tommaso
- Written by: John Cabrera; Cosimo De Tommaso
- Directed by: Stewart Hendler
- Starring: Caitriona Balfe; Hannah Herzsprung; Alexis Denisof; Sean Gunn; David Clayton Rogers
- Composer: Nathan Lanier
- Country of origin: United States
- Original language: English
- No. of episodes: 48

Production
- Executive producers: Beatriz Acevedo; Doug Greiff; Lance Sloane; Marc Berliner; Bill O'Dowd; James Henrie; Philip von Alvensleben; John Cabrera; Cosimo De Tommaso; Stewart Hendler
- Producers: Bryan Singer; Jason Taylor
- Production locations: Santiago, Chile
- Camera setup: Multi-camera
- Running time: 4–8 minutes
- Production companies: Bad Hat Harry Productions; Warner Premiere Digital; Dolphin Entertainment

Original release
- Network: YouTube
- Release: August 8, 2012 – January 16, 2013

H+: The Digital Series (often abbreviated as H+) is an American web series directed by Stewart Hendler and created by John Cabrera and Cosimo De Tommaso. The series explores a dystopian near future brought about by a technological singularity holocaust from the perspective of differing transhumanism factions, premiered on August 8, 2012, on YouTube with two episodes. Two new episodes were then released every week on Wednesdays until the season finale on January 16, 2013. A second season was announced in January 2013. However, there have been no updates since.

== Production ==
The series began as a long-term project in 2006. It was filmed in Santiago, Chile in 2011, over 29 days in 54 different locations, and announced at the 2011 San Diego Comic-Con. At the 2012 San Diego Comic-Con, it was again promoted in anticipation of its upcoming premiere. The series is distributed by Warner Brothers Digital Distribution in partnership with YouTube.

As new episodes premiered weekly via YouTube, new supplemental content was also made available through the series' official website, providing extra images, text, or video that tied into the story further.

== Background ==
The series is based on a future where one-third of the world's population has a neural implant named H+, which connects the human mind to the Internet 24 hours a day. The implant was created by a company called Hplus Nano Teoranta, an Irish biotechnology company founded with the intent of improving the medical sector with technology.

The story begins in medias res, depicting the effects of a malicious hacker's computer virus which infects all of the users of the H+ neural implant, killing off one-third of the world's population.

Concurrent episodes go back-and-forward in time to different settings, and various characters' viewpoints are used to tell the story.

== Cast and characters ==
- Alexis Denisof as Conall Sheehan
- Caitriona Balfe as Breanna Sheehan
- Hannah Simone as Leena Param
- Karrien Marsukhan as Ritu Param
- Amir Arison as Y. Gurveer
- Bhavna Kewlani as Mrs.Param
- David Clayton Rogers as Kenneth Lubahn
- Francesca Fanti as Simona Rossi
- Nikki Crawford as Julie Martin
- Sean Gunn as Jason O'Brien
- Samuli Vauramo as Topi Kuusela
- Hannah Herzsprung as Manta
- Francesco Martino as Matteo Spina
- Melvin Abston as Lee Martin
- Lela Loren as Francesca Rossi
- James Urbaniak as Francis Peters
- Carlos Bravo as Ichiro
- Benjamin Clarke as Peters
- Eduardo Burle Sussely as Patricio Raiz
- John Cabrera as Andy

== Episodes ==
All episodes were directed by Stewart Hendler and written by John Cabrera and Cosimo De Tommaso.

No.	Title	Original release date
1	"Driving Under"	August 8, 2012
San Francisco, USA, 5 minutes before it happened.
2	"On Their Level"	August 8, 2012
San Francisco, USA, 15 seconds after it happened.
3	"Prophetess"	August 15, 2012
Helsinki, Finland, 7 years before it happened.
4	"Airport Security"	August 15, 2012
San Francisco, USA, 1 minute after it happened.
5	"A Large Family"	August 15, 2012
Mumbai, India, 5 months before it happened.
6	"Voci Dal Sud"	August 15, 2012
Oria, Italy, 2 years after it happened.
7	"Implanted"	August 22, 2012
Mumbai, India, 5 months before it happened.
8	"Makeshift Engineering"	August 22, 2012
San Francisco, USA, 45 minutes after it happened.
9	"The Snow Viper"	August 22, 2012
Helsinki, Finland, 7 years before it happened.
10	"Out"	August 29, 2012
San Francisco, USA, 50 minutes after it happened.
11	"Manta"	August 29, 2012
Helsinki, Finland, 7 years before it happened.
12	"Searching Over"	August 29, 2012
San Francisco, USA, 20 hours after it happened.
13	"Questions?"	September 5, 2012
Portland, Oregon, 5 years before it happened.
14	"The Gates"	September 5, 2012
San Vito, Italy, 2 years after it happened.
15	"Their Connection"	September 12, 2012
Mumbai, India, 3 months before it happened.
16	"From Above"	September 12, 2012
San Francisco, USA, 2 days after it happened.
17	"Salmiakki"	September 19, 2012
Helsinki, Finland, 7 years before it happened.
18	"Advent"	September 19, 2012
Oria, Italy, 2 years after it happened.
19	"7500 Kilometers"	September 26, 2012
Mumbai, India, 1 month before it happened.
20	"Partenza"	September 26, 2012
Oria, Italy, 2 years after it happened.
21	"Managing"	October 3, 2012
Dublin, Ireland, 4 years before it happened.
22	"Road Block"	October 3, 2012
Southern Italy, 2 years after it happened.
23	"The King"	October 10, 2012
Dublin, Ireland, 3 weeks before it happened.
24	"Function"	October 10, 2012
San Francisco, USA, 1 week after it happened.
25	"Meta Data"	October 17, 2012
Tierra del Fuego, Chile, 4 years before it happened.
26	"African Aid"	October 17, 2012
Brazzaville, Republic of Congo, 1 year after it happened.
27	"Il Portavoce"	October 17, 2012
Oria, Italy, 3 months before it happened.
28	"Coming Clean"	October 24, 2012
Northern California, USA, 2 weeks after it happened.
29	"After Party"	October 24, 2012
Dublin, Ireland, 3 years before it happened.
30	"Lord of the Body"	October 31, 2012
Mumbai, India, 7 months after it happened.
31	"Original Sync"	October 31, 2012
London, UK, 9 years before it happened.
32	"Seeds"	November 7, 2012
Dunbara, Republic of Congo, 1 year after it happened.
33	"On the Exterior"	November 7, 2012
Northern California, USA, 3 years before it happened.
34	"Endure"	November 14, 2012
Mumbai, India, 8 months after it happened.
35	"Query String"	November 14, 2012
Northern California, USA, 3 years before it happened.
36	"How to Hack a Data Center"	November 14, 2012
Southern Alberta, Canada, 8 months after it happened.
37	"Gross Figure"	November 28, 2012
New York, USA, 8 years before it happened.
38	"On The Inside"	November 28, 2012
Rome, Italy, 2 years after it happened.
39	"Long Term Benefits"	December 5, 2012
Dunbara, Republic of Congo, 7 years before it happened.
40	"Two of Them"	December 5, 2012
Rome, Italy, 2 years after it happened.
41	"Pronto"	December 12, 2012
Northern California, USA, 3 months before it happened. Oria, Italy, 3 months before it happened.
42	"Temporary"	December 12, 2012
Yozgat, Turkey, 1 year after it happened.
43	"Make Things Right"	December 19, 2012
Northern California, USA, 2 weeks before it happened.
44	"From/to Level 6"	December 19, 2012
Southern Alaska, 1 year after it happened.
45	"Der Wahre Übermensch?"	January 9, 2013
Hamburg, Germany, 3 years before it happened.
46	"Sacred Science"	January 9, 2013
The Vatican, Italy, 2 years after it happened.
47	"On The Brink"	January 16, 2013
Western Ireland, 30 minutes before it happened.
48	"Visions of What's Come"	January 16, 2013
Southern Alaska, 1 year after it happened. San Francisco, USA, 5 minutes before it happened. Western Ireland, 8 minutes before it happened. Tokyo, Japan, 15 seconds after it happened.

== Reception ==
Tubefilter wrote, "easily one of the most epic, well shot, well thought through web series released this year."

Geek Speak Magazine called the series "the official embracement of the web series as a viable creative alternative to films and television."
