= Otmara Marrero =

American actress (born 1989)

- Born: March 1, 1989 (age 37); Miami, Florida, U.S.
- Occupation: Actress
- Known for: Clementine
- Notable work: Connecting..., StartUp

Otmara Marrero (born March 1, 1989) is an American actress. She is known for the NBC series Connecting..., 2019's Clementine, and Crackle's 2016 series StartUp.

== Early life ==
Marrero was born in Miami, Florida, to a Cuban American family, and raised in Hialeah. She was a dancer for the Miami Marlins.

== Career ==
Marrero's first onscreen role was a small part in a season 3 episode of USA Network's Graceland. Her performance in Damian Fitzsimmons' Off the Rails earned her a Commendation award at the Liverpool International Film Festival, while she won a breakthrough award at the Downtown LA film festival for her performance in Clementine. She filmed her part in Connecting... at home.

== Selected filmography ==
Year	Title	Role	Notes	Ref.
2016–2018	StartUp	Izzy Morales	30 episodes	
2018	Miss Arizona	Sammy		
2018	Off The Rails	Anna		
2019	Clementine	Karen		
2020	Connecting...	Annie	8 episodes	
2022	Jackass Forever	Herself		
2023	Florida Man	Patsy	Miniseries; 7 episodes	
2025	The Scout	Becca		
