= Stewart Hendler =

American film director

- Born: December 22, 1978 (age 47); California, United States
- Occupation: Film director
- Notable work: Halo 4: Forward Unto Dawn

Stewart Hendler (born December 22, 1978) is an American film, commercial and digital series director.

He is best known for his work in digital series, where he directed the Halo 4: Forward Unto Dawn in conjunction with the promotion of the video game Halo 4, and H+: The Digital Series, a digital series created by John Cabrera and Cosimo De Tomasso.

Hendler also directed the 2009 slasher film Sorority Row, and the 2007 supernatural horror film Whisper and the 2016 superhero film Max Steel based on the Mattel action figure.

In addition to longform projects, Hendler has also directed high end automotive TV campaigns.

Hendler was born in southern California and is a 2001 graduate of the University of Southern California School of Cinema Television.

== Filmography ==
Film

- Whisper (2007)
- Sorority Row (2009)
- Max Steel (2016)

Television

Year	Title	Director	Producer	Notes
2011	Pretty Tough	Yes	No	
2011–2013	H+: The Digital Series	Yes	Executive	
2012	Halo 4: Forward Unto Dawn	Yes	No	Miniseries and tie-in to Halo 4
2016	Live to Tell	No	Yes	
2022	Breakwater	No	Executive	
2023	Superman & Lois	Yes	No	Episode "Too Close to Home"
