= Dolphin Entertainment =

American entertainment company

Dolphin Entertainment, Inc.
- Type: Public
- Traded as: Nasdaq: DLPN; Russell Microcap Index component
- Industry: Mass media; Entertainment
- Founded: 1996; 30 years ago in Miami, Florida
- Founder: Bill O'Dowd
- Headquarters: Coral Gables, Florida, United States
- Area served: Worldwide
- Key people: Bill O'Dowd (Chairman and CEO)
- Products: Feature films Television; Digital content
- Divisions: Dolphin Entertainment; Dolphin Marketing; Dolphin Ventures
- Subsidiaries: 42West; The Door; Shore Fire Media; The Digital Dept. Viewpoint Creative; Special Projects; Elle Communications; Always Alpha; Dolphin Films
- Website: dolphinentertainment.com

Dolphin Entertainment, Inc. is an American entertainment marketing and production company based in Coral Gables, Florida. Founded in 1996 by Bill O'Dowd, the company produces television series and films aimed primarily at children and young adults, and owns public relations and marketing firms through acquisitions. Dolphin has also expanded into digital media, including non-fungible token (NFT) ventures and influencer marketing.

== History ==
Dolphin Entertainment was founded in 1996 in Miami by Bill O'Dowd, a Harvard Law School graduate who had previously worked as a corporate lawyer. In its earliest years, the company specialized in live-action children's and young-adult programming and built a catalog of executive producer credits that included the Nickelodeon series Zoey 101 and Ned's Declassified School Survival Guide, as well as the Nickelodeon original movies Shredderman Rules, The Last Day of Summer and the Roxy Hunter television film franchise. Zoey 101 was nominated for the Outstanding Children's Program Emmy Award in 2005, with O'Dowd serving as executive producer. In 2007, Dolphin Entertainment had signed a deal with Sony Pictures Home Entertainment to distribute home video releases of its television movies, mostly from Nickelodeon (four of them were eventually co-owned).

In June 2008, Dolphin Digital Media, Inc., a digital subsidiary established by O'Dowd to develop child-safe social networking websites tied to the company's television properties, was acquired by Toronto-based Logica Holdings, Inc. in a reverse takeover in exchange for approximately 24 million shares of Logica common stock, representing 51% of the outstanding shares. Logica subsequently renamed itself Dolphin Digital Media, Inc. and changed its ticker symbol to DPDM. In 2010, the company launched the Dolphin Digital Studios division to produce original online programming for tweens and teens. In 2016, Dolphin's Dolphin Films division partnered with Mattel and Ingenious Media to co-finance and produce the live-action superhero film Max Steel, starring Andy García and Maria Bello. In October 2016, it opened an office in Corning.

In March 2017, Dolphin acquired the entertainment public-relations firm 42West for approximately US$28 million in an all-stock transaction that included up to US$9.3 million in performance-based contingent consideration. In July 2017, the company changed its name from Dolphin Digital Media, Inc. to Dolphin Entertainment, Inc., and on December 21, 2017 it uplisted its common stock to the Nasdaq under the symbol DLPN.

In July 2018, Dolphin acquired the lifestyle and hospitality public relations agency, The Door, for aggregate consideration of up to US$11 million, including up to US$7 million in performance-based contingent consideration. In October 2018, it acquired the Massachusetts-based creative branding and production firm Viewpoint Creative for US$2 million in cash and stock. In December 2019, Dolphin acquired the music and entertainment public-relations firm Shore Fire Media, at which point all three of Dolphin's PR subsidiaries, 42West, The Door and Shore Fire, appeared on the Observer PR Power 50 list.

In March 2021, Dolphin Entertainment "formed a new division dedicated to designing, producing, releasing and promoting NFTs for the company and its clients across film, TV, music, gaming, food and technology."

In August 2020, Dolphin acquired the Los Angeles-based influencer marketing agency Be Social, founded by Ali Grant. In January 2021, Dolphin acquired the gaming and esports communications firm B/HI (formerly Bender/Helper Impact), which became a division of 42West. In March 2021, Dolphin formed a new division dedicated to the design, production and promotion of non-fungible tokens (NFTs) across film, television, music, gaming and hospitality, and in August 2021 it announced a joint venture with West Realm Shire Services to create consumer-facing NFT marketplaces for sports and entertainment brands.

In 2022, Dolphin opened the Midnight Theatre, a 150-seat performance venue in Manhattan West in New York City, later renamed the Mastercard Midnight Theatre under a multi-year sponsorship with Mastercard. In March 2022, Dolphin Entertainment formed a joint initiative with The Flower Girls, a fine art NFT collection by artist Varvara Alay. In May 2022, Dolphin and IMAX Corporation signed a multi-year agreement, announced at the Cannes Film Festival, to jointly finance, develop, and produce a slate of feature-length documentaries. Later that year, in November 2022, Dolphin acquired the New York-based influencer marketing agency Socialyte. In September 2023, Be Social and Socialyte were merged to form a unified creator-economy agency called The Digital Dept. In October 2023, Dolphin acquired the talent-booking and event production agency Special Projects.

In May 2024, Dolphin Films released The Blue Angels, a documentary film co-financed with IMAX about the United States Navy Blue Angels flight demonstration squadron, which debuted at number one on Prime Video in the United States over the Memorial Day weekend and became one of the highest-grossing documentaries of the year. In July 2024, Dolphin acquired Elle Communications, a New York– and Los Angeles–based public relations agency specializing in social and environmental impact, paying US$2.025 million in cash and 2,089,783 shares of common stock at closing, with up to US$450,000 in additional cash consideration tied to 2024 revenue. In October 2024, Dolphin launched Always Alpha, a talent management firm focused exclusively on women's sports, founded by Olympic track-and-field athlete Allyson Felix, her brother Wes Felix and sports executive Cosette Chaput.

In February 2026, Dolphin formed a joint initiative with DealMaker to facilitate retail capital investment in celebrity-led consumer and lifestyle brands. Dolphin also co-produced Youngblood, a remake of the 1986 ice hockey drama, with Canadian studio Aircraft Pictures. The film premiered at the 2025 Toronto International Film Festival and was released in North America in March 2026 by Well Go USA and Photon Films.

== Acquisitions ==
List of companies acquired by Dolphin Entertainment
Company acquired	Date of acquisition	Company notes	References
42West	March 2017	Public relations and marketing firm	
The Door	July 2018	lifestyle and hospitality public relations, creative branding and marketing services agency	
Viewpoint Creative	November 2018	full-service boutique creative branding and production agency	
Shore Fire Media	December 2019	public relations and media management firm	
Be Social	August 2020	digital influencer marketing firm	
B/HI	January 2021	boutique gaming and e-sports PR firm	
Special Projects	October 2023	talent booking and events firm	

== Selected filmography ==
This includes:

=== Films ===
- Break-In (2006)
- Vanished (2006)
- Stranded (2006)
- Shredderman Rules (2007)
- The Last Day of Summer (2007)
- Roxy Hunter and the Mystery of the Moody Ghost (2007)
- Christmas in Paradise (2007)
- Roxy Hunter and the Secret of the Shaman (2008)
- Roxy Hunter and the Myth of the Mermaid (2008)
- Gym Teacher: The Movie (2008)
- The Unquiet (2008)
- Roxy Hunter and the Horrific Halloween (2008)
- Spectacular! (2009)
- What's Up Warthogs! (2010)
- Justin Bieber's Believe (2013)
- Max Steel (2016)
- The Blue Angels (2024)

=== Series ===
- Ocean Ave. (2002–2003)
- Ned's Declassified School Survival Guide (2004–2007)
- Zoey 101 (2005–2008)
- Tower Prep (2010)
- Aim High (2011–2013)
- Robot and Monster (2012–2015)
- H+: The Digital Series (2012–2013)
- Raising Expectations (2016–2018)
