= List of films adapted into novels =

This is a list of films that were adapted into novels.

== Action films ==
=== A ===
Title	Author	Catalog / ISBN	Publisher	Date	Notes
Air Force One	Max Allan Collins	0345419758 / 9780345419750	Ballantine Books	June 29, 1997	
Another 48 Hrs.	Deborah Chiel	0671725734 / 9780671725730	Pocket Books	June 15, 1990	
Assassins	Robert Tine	1572971061 / 9781572971066	Berkley Books	November 1995	

=== B ===
Title	Author	Catalog / ISBN	Publisher	Date	Notes
Baahubali 2: The Conclusion					
Backdraft	Kirk Mitchell	0425128792 / 9780425128794	Berkley Books	May 1991	
Black Rain	Mike Cogan	067168969X / 9780671689698	Pocket Books	1989	
Broken Arrow	Jeff Rovin	1572970855 / 9781572970854	Berkley Books	February 1996	

=== C ===
Title	Author	Catalog / ISBN	Publisher	Date	Notes
The Cannonball Run	Michael Avallone	0843909935 / 9780843909937	Leisure Books	June 1981	
Chain Reaction	Robert Tine	0312958846 / 9780312958848	St. Martin's Press	August 1996	
Cliffhanger	Jeff Rovin	0515112674 / 9780515112672	Jove Books	1993	
Con Air	Richard Woodley	0786889268 / 9780786889266	Hyperion Books	June 1997	
Conspiracy Theory	J.H. Marks	0451194160 / 9780451194169	Signet Books	July 1997	
Crimson Tide	Richard P. Henrick	0380783231 / 9780380783236	Avon Books	June 1995	

=== D ===
Title	Author	Catalog / ISBN	Publisher	Date	Notes
Die Hard with a Vengeance	Deborah Chiel	0312956762 / 9780312956769	St. Martin's Press	May 1995	First installment in the Die Hard series.

=== E ===
Title	Author	Catalog / ISBN	Publisher	Date	Notes
Eraser	Robert Tine	0451191102 / 9780451191106	Signet Books	June 1996	

=== F ===
Title	Author	Catalog / ISBN	Publisher	Date	Notes
French Connection II	Robin Moore, Milt Machlin	0440052629 / 9780440052623	Dell Publishing	June 1975	

=== G ===
Title	Author	Catalog / ISBN	Publisher	Date	Notes
Gone in 60 Seconds	M.C. Bolin	0786889896 / 9780786889891	Hyperion Books	June 2000	

=== H ===
Title	Author	Catalog / ISBN	Publisher	Date	Notes
Hard Target	Robert Tine	0425138615 / 9780425138618	Berkley Books	August 1993	
Hudson Hawk	Geoffrey Marsh	0515107387 / 9780515107388	Jove Books	1991	

=== I ===
Title	Author	Catalog / ISBN	Publisher	Date	Notes
Indiana Jones and the Kingdom of the Crystal Skull	James Rollins	0345501284	Del Rey Books	2008	Fourth installment in the Indiana Jones series.
Indiana Jones and the Last Crusade	Rob MacGregor	034536161X	Ballantine Books	1989	Third installment in the Indiana Jones series.
Indiana Jones and the Temple of Doom	James Kahn	0345314573	Ballantine Books	1984	Second installment in the Indiana Jones series.

=== J ===
Title	Author	Catalog / ISBN	Publisher	Date	Notes
James Bond, the Spy Who Loved Me	Christopher Wood	0-224-01497-8/978-0-224-01497-7	Jonathan Cape	1977	Not to be confused with The Spy Who Loved Me (novel)
James Bond and Moonraker	Christopher Wood	0-224-01734-9	Jonathan Cape	1979	Not to be confused with Moonraker (novel)

=== L ===
Title	Author	Catalog / ISBN	Publisher	Date	Notes
The Last Boy Scout	Dan Becker	051510874X / 9780515108743	Jove Books	1992	
Lethal Weapon	Kirk Mitchell	0553174959	Bantam Books	March 1987	First installment in the Lethal Weapon series.
The Long Kiss Goodnight	Randall Boyll	0312953143 / 9780312953140	St. Martin's Press	November 1996	

=== P ===
Title	Author	Catalog / ISBN	Publisher	Date	Notes
The Punisher	D.A. Stern	0345475569	Del Rey Books	2004	Novelization of the 2004 film based on the eponymous character from Marvel Comics.

=== R ===
Title	Author	Catalog / ISBN	Publisher	Date	Notes
Raiders of the Lost Ark	Campbell Black	0345353757	Del Rey Books	1981	First installment in the Indiana Jones series.
Rambo: First Blood Part II	David Morrell	0-515-08399-2	Jove Books	1985	Second installment in the Rambo series.
Rambo III	David Morrell	0-515-09333-5	Jove Books	1988	Third installment in the Rambo series.
Raw Deal	Walter Wager	0446302015 / 9780446302012	Warner Books	1986	
Red Heat	Robert Tine	0380755653 / 9780380755653	Avon Books	1988	

=== S ===
Title	Author	Catalog / ISBN	Publisher	Date	Notes
The Saint	Burl Barer	0671009516 / 9780671009519	Pocket Books	April 1997	
Snakes on a Plane	Christa Faust	1844163814	Games Workshop	2006	
Speed 2: Cruise Control	George Ryan	0061012572 / 9780061012570	HarperCollins	1997	
Sudden Death	Stephen Mertz	1572970324 / 9781572970328	Boulevard Books	October 1995	

=== T ===
Title	Author	Catalog / ISBN	Publisher	Date	Notes
Top Gun	Mike Cogan	0671618245 / 9780671618247	Pocket Books	1986	
True Lies	Dewey Gram, Duane Dell'Amico	0451182650 / 9780451182654	Signet Books	August 15, 1994	

=== V ===
Title	Author	Catalog / ISBN	Publisher	Date	Notes
V for Vendetta	Steve Moore	1416516999	Pocket Star Books	2006	Novelization of the film based on the based on the homonymous 1988–89 comic book limited series.
Virtuosity	Terry Bisson	0671537520 / 9780671537524	Pocket Books	August 1995	

=== W ===
Title	Author	Catalog / ISBN	Publisher	Date	Notes
Windtalkers	Max Allan Collins	0060000961 / 9780060000967	October 2, 2001	HarperEntertainment	

== Adventure films ==
=== B ===
Title	Author	Catalog / ISBN	Publisher	Date	Notes
Baby	Ian Don	0352316934 / 9780352316936	Star Books	1985	

=== I ===
Title	Author	Catalog / ISBN	Publisher	Date	Notes
In Search of the Castaways	Hettie Jones	0671819364 / 9780671819361	Pocket Books	February 1978	Published 16 years after the release of the source film.

=== J ===
Title	Author	Catalog / ISBN	Publisher	Date	Notes
The Journey of Natty Gann	Ann Matthews	0671606492 / 9780671606497	Archway Paperbacks	1985	

=== L ===
Title	Author	Catalog / ISBN	Publisher	Date	Notes
The Last Flight of Noah's Ark (US)	Chas Carner	0345291735 / 9780345291738	Ballantine Books	1980	American novelization.
The Last Flight of Noah's Ark (UK)	Heather Simon	0450050068 / 9780450050060	New English Library	1980	British novelization.

=== P ===
Title	Author	Catalog / ISBN	Publisher	Date	Notes
Pirates of the Caribbean: The Curse of the Black Pearl	Irene Trimble	0736421718	Disney Press	2003	First installment in the Pirates of the Caribbean series; junior novelization.

=== R ===
Title	Author	Catalog / ISBN	Publisher	Date	Notes
The Road to El Dorado	Peter Lerangis	0141310049 / 9780141310046	Puffin Books	2000	
Romancing the Stone	Catherine Lanigan (credited to Joan Wilder)	0380872625 / 9780380872626	Avon Books	1984	

=== T ===
Title	Author	Catalog / ISBN	Publisher	Date	Notes
Tall Tale: The Unbelievable Adventures of Pecos Bill	Todd Strasser	0786840110 / 9780786840113	Disney Press	April 1995	
Treasure of Matecumbe	Derry Moffatt	0450032485 / 9780450032486	New English Library	April 1977	

=== W ===
Title	Author	Catalog / ISBN	Publisher	Date	Notes
Warlords of Atlantis	Paul Victor	0708813925 / 9780708813928	Futura Books	1978	

=== Y ===
Title	Author	Catalog / ISBN	Publisher	Date	Notes
Young Sherlock Holmes	Alan Arnold	0583309429 / 9780583309424	Grafton	1985	

== Comedy films ==
=== 0–9 ===
Title	Author	Catalog / ISBN	Publisher	Date	Notes
1941	Bob Gale	0345283325 / 9780345283320	Ballantine Books	1979	

=== A ===
Title	Author	Catalog / ISBN	Publisher	Date	Notes
Adventures in Babysitting	Elizabeth Faucher	0590412515 / 9780590412513	Point	1987	

=== B ===
Title	Author	Catalog / ISBN	Publisher	Date	Notes
The Baby-Sitters Club	A. L. Singer	059060404X / 9780590604048	Scholastic	August 1995	
The Bad News Bears	Richard Woodley	044090823X / 9780440908234	Dell Publishing	1976	First installment in the Bad News Bears series.
The Bad News Bears Go to Japan	Richard Woodley	0440104270 / 9780440104278	Dell Publishing	1978	Third installment in the Bad News Bears series.
The Bad News Bears in Breaking Training	Richard Woodley	0440104173 / 9780440104179	Dell Publishing	1977	Second installment in the Bad News Bears series.
Bloodbath at the House of Death					

=== C ===
Title	Author	Catalog / ISBN	Publisher	Date	Notes
The Cat from Outer Space	Ted Key	067181740X / 9780671560546	Pocket Books	June 1978	
Clueless					
Cookie	Todd Strasser	0451159918 / 9780451159915	Signet Books	1989	

=== D ===
Title	Author	Catalog / ISBN	Publisher	Date	Notes
The Devil and Max Devlin	Robert Grossbach	0345293649 / 978-0345293640	Ballantine Books	1981	
Down and Out in Beverly Hills	Ian Marter	0352318635 / 978-0352318633	Star Books	1986	

=== F ===
Title	Author	Catalog / ISBN	Publisher	Date	Notes
Ferris Bueller's Day Off	Todd Strasser	0451145356 / 9780451145352	Signet Books	June 1986	
Freaked	Todd Strasser	044040908X / 9780440409083	The Trumpet Club	October 1993	

=== G ===
Title	Author	Catalog / ISBN	Publisher	Date	Notes
Ghostbusters	Larry Milne	0727811932	1984	Coronet Books	First installment in the Ghostbusters series.
Ghostbusters II	Ed Naha	0440204607 / 9780440204602	Dell Publishing	June 1989	Second installment in the Ghostbusters series.
Good Burger	Joseph Locke	978-0671016920	Pocket Books	1997	

=== H ===
Title	Author	Catalog / ISBN	Publisher	Date	Notes
Handle with Care	E. M. Corder	9780671811808	Pocket Books	1977	Novel "Citizen's Band" was original name of edited, re-titled and re-released film.
Home Alone	Todd Strasser	0590446681 / 9780590446686	Scholastic	January 1991	
Home Alone 2: Lost in New York	Todd Strasser	0590457179 / 9780590457170	Scholastic	November 1992	
Home Alone 3	Todd Strasser	0590957120 / 9780590957120	Scholastic	December 1997	

=== J ===
Title	Author	Catalog / ISBN	Publisher	Date	Notes
Jungle 2 Jungle	Nancy E. Krulik	0786841192 / 9780786841196	Disney Press	April 1997	

=== L ===
Title	Author	Catalog / ISBN	Publisher	Date	Notes
License to Drive	A. L. Singer	0590419803 / 9780590419802	Scholastic	June 1988	

=== M ===
Title	Author	Catalog / ISBN	Publisher	Date	Notes
Man of the House	Todd Strasser	0786840404 / 9780786840403	Disney Press	March 1995	
Mean Girls	Micol Ostow	133828195X	Scholastic Corporation	2017	
Midnight Madness	Tom Wright	0441529852 / 9780441529858	Ace Books	1980	
Mr. Magoo	Nancy E. Krulik	0786841745 / 9780786841745	Disney Press	December 1997	

=== O ===
Title	Author	Catalog / ISBN	Publisher	Date	Notes
One of Our Dinosaurs Is Missing	John Harvey	0450028267 / 9780450028267	New English Library	March 4, 1976	
Outrageous Fortune	Robin Turner	035232080X / 9780352320803	Star Books	1987	

=== R ===
Title	Author	Catalog / ISBN	Publisher	Date	Notes
Richie Rich	Todd Strasser	0590250922 / 9780590250924	Scholastic	December 1994	
Rookie of the Year	Todd Strasser	0440409101/9780440409106	The Trumpet Club	September 1993	
Ruthless People	Martin Noble	0352320265 / 9780352320261	Star Books	1986	

=== S ===
Title	Author	Catalog / ISBN	Publisher	Date	Notes
Snowball Express	Joe Claro	0590303597 / 9780590303590	Scholastic Book Services	1980	Published eight years after the release of the source film.
The Spaceman and King Arthur	Heather Simon	0450045676 / 9780450045677	New English Library	August 1979	British novelization of the film Unidentified Flying Oddball (1979), under the alternative title.
Struck by Lightning				2012	
Superdad	Ann Spanoghe	0450031438 / 9780450031434	New English Library	November 1976	

=== T ===
Title	Author	Catalog / ISBN	Publisher	Date	Notes
That Darn Cat	The Gordons	0590086138 / 9780590086134	Scholastic Book Services	1973	Published eight years after the release of the source film.
Tin Men	Martin Noble	0352320818 / 9780352320810	Star Books	1987	

=== Z ===
Title	Author	Catalog / ISBN	Publisher	Date	Notes
Zorro, The Gay Blade	Les Dean	0843910070	Leisure Books	1981	

== Drama films ==
=== A ===
Title	Author	Catalog / ISBN	Publisher	Date	Notes
American Gigolo	Timothy Harris	0385280254 / 978-0385280259	Dell Publishing	1979	Published a year before the release of the source film.
Appa				2016	
Aval Appadithan					

=== C ===
Title	Author	Catalog / ISBN	Publisher	Date	Notes
The Complete American Graffiti: The Novel	John Minahan	0425045544 / 9780425045541	Berkley Books	1979	Novelization of the films American Graffiti (1973) and More American Graffiti (1979).

=== D ===
Title	Author	Catalog / ISBN	Publisher	Date	Notes
Dead Poets Society	Nancy H. Kleinbaum	9781401308773	Hyperion Books	1989	
The Deer Hunter	E. M. Corder	0896730352 / 9780896730359	Jove Books	1978	

=== F ===
Title	Author	Catalog / ISBN	Publisher	Date	Notes
Far and Away	Sonja Massie	0-425-13298-6	Berkley Books	1992	
Fireworks				2017	

=== G ===
Title	Author	Catalog / ISBN	Publisher	Date	Notes
Gallipoli	Jack Bennett	0-312-31572-4	St. Martins Press	1981	

=== H ===
Title	Author	Catalog / ISBN	Publisher	Date	Notes
Heavy Metal	L.F. Blake	0417063504 / 9780417063508	Magnum Littlehampton Book Services	1980	Novelization of the film Riding High (1981).

=== K ===
Title	Author	Catalog / ISBN	Publisher	Date	Notes
Kanku					
The Killing Fields	Christopher Hudson	0440144590 / 9780440144595	Dell Publishing	1984	

=== O ===
Title	Author	Catalog / ISBN	Publisher	Date	Notes
Once Upon a Time in Hollywood	Quentin Tarantino	0063112523 / 9780063112520	Harper Perennial	2021	

=== R ===
Title	Author	Catalog / ISBN	Publisher	Date	Notes
Rain Man	Leonore Fleischer	0451162846 / 9780451162847	Signet Books	February 14, 1989	

=== S ===
Title	Author	Catalog / ISBN	Publisher	Date	Notes
Savitri				1993	
School Ties	Deborah Chiel	0671777157 / 9780671777159	Pocket Books	August 1992	
The Sugarland Express	Henry Clement	445-08276-125	Popular Library	1974	

=== T ===
Title	Author	Catalog / ISBN	Publisher	Date	Notes
Tucker: The Man and His Dream	Robert Tine	0671665863 / 9780671665869	Pocket Books	1988	

=== W ===
Title	Author	Catalog / ISBN	Publisher	Date	Notes
The Wave	Todd Strasser	0440993717	Dell Publishing	1981	Novelization of the film.

== Epic films ==
- The Fall of the Roman Empire
- Mayabazar
- Sri Rama Rajyam

== Fantasy films ==
- The Boy and the Beast
- Constantine

=== D ===
Title	Author	Catalog / ISBN	Publisher	Date	Notes
Dragonheart	Charles Edward Pogue	1572971304	Berkley Books	1996	
Dragonslayer	Wayland Drew	034529694X / 978-0345296948	Ballantine Books	1981	

- Ghost Dad (fantasy comedy)

=== H ===
Title	Author	Catalog / ISBN	Publisher	Date	Notes
Harry and the Hendersons	Joyce Thompson	042510155X / 9780425101551	Berkley Books	1987	
Hawk the Slayer	Terry Marcel; Harry Robertson	0450050467 / 9780450050466	New English Library	1981	
Highlander				1986	
Honey, I Shrunk the Kids	Elizabeth Faucher	0140902120 / 9780140902129	Fantail	1989	

=== L ===
Title	Author	Catalog / ISBN	Publisher	Date	Notes
The Lost Boys	Craig Shaw Gardner	0425100448	Berkley Books	1987	

=== M ===
Title	Author	Catalog / ISBN	Publisher	Date	Notes
The Story of Walt Disney's Motion Picture Mary Poppins	Mary Virginia Carey	2317	Whitman Publishing Company	1964	Young adult novelization.
Mirai					
My Neighbor Totoro					

=== O ===
Title	Author	Catalog / ISBN	Publisher	Date	Notes
One Magic Christmas	Martin Noble	0426202422 / 9780426202424	W. H. Allen & Co.	1985	

=== P ===
Title	Author	Catalog / ISBN	Publisher	Date	Notes
Pan's Labyrinth: The Labyrinth of the Faun	Guillermo del Toro, Cornelia Funke	0062414461	Katherine Tegen	2019	
Pete's Dragon (US)	Jean Bethell	044816101X / 9780448161013	Wonder Books	1978	American novelization.
Pete's Dragon (UK)	Dewy Moffatt	0450038378 / 9780450038372	New English Library	October 1978	British novelization.

=== R ===
Title	Author	Catalog / ISBN	Publisher	Date	Notes
Return to Oz	Joan D. Vinge	034532207X / 9780345322074	Ballantine Books	1985	

=== S ===
Title	Author	Catalog / ISBN	Publisher	Date	Notes
Snow White and the Seven Dwarfs				1938	
Splash	Ian Don	0352315946 / 9780352315946	Star Books	1984	

=== W ===
Title	Author	Catalog / ISBN	Publisher	Date	Notes
Who Framed Roger Rabbit	Martin Noble	0352323892 / 9780352323897	Star Books	1988	Novelization of the film.
Willow	Wayland Drew	0345351959 / 9780345351951	Ballantine Books	1988	Novelization of the film.

== Horror films ==
=== 0–9 ===
Title	Author	Catalog / ISBN	Publisher	Date	Notes
30 Days of Night	Tim Lebbon	1416544976	Pocket Star Books	2007	Novelization of the film based on the eponymous comic book miniseries created by Steve Niles.

=== A ===
Title	Author	Catalog / ISBN	Publisher	Date	Notes
Asylum	William Johnston	0552676721 / 9780552676724	Bantam Books	1972	

=== B ===
Title	Author	Catalog / ISBN	Publisher	Date	Notes
Black Christmas	Lee Hays	445-08467-150	Popular Library	1976	
Blood Feast	Herschell Gordon Lewis	9780938782070	Novel Books	1964	
Bram Stoker's Dracula	Fred Saberhagen, James V. Hart	0451175751	Signet Books	1992	Novelization of the 1992 film based on the homonyonus 1897 novel by Bram Stoker.
Butcher, Baker, Nightmare Maker	Joseph Burgo, Richard Natale	0671429353	Pocket Books	1981	

=== C ===
Title	Author	Catalog / ISBN	Publisher	Date	Notes
The Cat o' Nine Tails	Paul J. Gillette	A870S	Award Books	1971	
Communion	Frank Lauria	0553112414	Random House Publishing	1977	Novelization of the film, better known as Alice, Sweet Alice.

=== D ===
Title	Author	Catalog / ISBN	Publisher	Date	Notes
Damien: Omen II	Joseph Howard	0-7088-1358-5	Futura Books (UK); Signet Books (US)	1978	Second installment in the Omen series.
Dawn of the Dead	George A. Romero; Susanna Sparrow	0312183933 / 978-0312183936	St. Martin's Press	1978	Third installment in the Living Dead series, adapted from the second film.

=== F ===
Title	Author	Catalog / ISBN	Publisher	Date	Notes
The Final Conflict	Gordon McGill	0-7088-1958-3	Futura Books (UK); Signet Books (US)	1981	Third installment in the Omen series.
Final Exam	Geoffrey Meyer	0523415850	Pinnacle Books	1981	
The Fog	Dennis Etchison	0553138251 / 978-0553138252	Bantam Books	1980	
Freddy vs. Jason	Stephen Hand	1844160599 / 9781844160594	Black Flame	July 29, 2003	Fourth installment in the Nightmare on Elm Street series, adapted from the crossover film with the Friday the 13th series.
Friday the 13th	Simon Hawke	0451150899	Signet Books	1987	Third installment in the Friday the 13th series, adapted from the first film.
Friday the 13th Part II	Simon Hawke	0451153375	Signet Books	1988	Fourth installment in the Friday the 13th series, adapted from the second film.
Friday the 13th Part 3 3-D	Michael Avallone	0352312491	1982	Tower & Leisure Sales Co.	First installment in the Friday the 13th series, adapted from the third film; first novelization of Part III.
Friday the 13th Part III	Simon Hawke	0451153111	Signet Books	1988	Fifth installment in the Friday the 13th series, adapted from the third film; second novelization of Part III, features an alternate ending from the overall film.
Fright Night	John Skipp, Craig Spector	979-8683973254	Goldmann	1985	
The Funhouse	Dean Koontz	0-425-14248-5	Jove Books	1980	Novelization of the film, released a year before its source material.

=== H ===
Title	Author	Catalog / ISBN	Publisher	Date	Notes
Halloween (1979)	Curtis Richards	0553132261 / 978-0553132267	Bantam Books	1979	First installment in the Halloween series, adapted from the 1978 film.
Halloween (2018)	John Passarella			October 23, 2018	Eighth installment in the Halloween series, adapted from the 2018 film.
Halloween Ends	Paul Brad Logan	9781803361703	Titan Books	2022	Tenth installment in the Halloween series, adapted from the eleventh film.
Halloween II	Jack Martin	089083864X / 978-0890838648	Zebra	1981	Second installment in the Halloween series, adapted from the second film.
Halloween III: Season of the Witch	Jack Martin	0515068853 / 978-0515068856	Jove Books	1982	Third installment in the Halloween series, adapted from the third film.
Halloween IV	Nicholas Grabowsky	1-55547-292-3 / 978-1-55547-292-4	Critic's Choice Paperbacks	1988	Fourth installment in the Halloween series, adapted from the fourth film.
Halloween Kills	Tim Waggoner	9781789096019	Titan Books	2021	Ninth installment in the Halloween series, adapted from the tenth film.
Happy Death Day & Happy Death Day 2U	Aaron Hartzler	1984897721/978-1984897725	Anchor Books	2019	Two novelizations in one volume.
House of Dark Shadows	Marilyn Ross	64-537	Paperback Library	October 1970	
The House on Haunted Hill	Tommy Jamerson	9781940865256	Next Stage Press	2019	

=== I ===
Title	Author	Catalog / ISBN	Publisher	Date	Notes
It Lives Again	James Dixon	0-345-27693-0/978-0-345-27693-3	Ballantine Books	1978	Second installment in the It's Alive series.
It's Alive!	Richard Woodley	0-345-25879-7 /978-0-345-25879-3	Ballantine Books	1977	First installment in the It's Alive series.

=== J ===
Title	Author	Catalog / ISBN	Publisher	Date	Notes
Jason Lives: Friday the 13th Part VI	Simon Hawke	0451146417	1986	Signet Books	Second installment in the Friday the 13th series, adapted from the sixth film.
Jason X	Pat Cadigan		Black Flame	2005	Novelization of the film.
Jennifer's Body	Audrey Nixon	006180892X	HarperFestival	2009	

=== L ===
Title	Author	Catalog / ISBN	Publisher	Date	Notes
Lord of Illusions	Clive Barker	0751516511	Little, Brown and Company	1995	

=== M ===
Title	Author	Catalog / ISBN	Publisher	Date	Notes
Manos: The Hands of Fate	Stephen D. Sullivan	1519301340	Walkabout Publishing	2015	
The Masque of the Red Death	Elsie Lee	72-725 (original), 1593934971 / 9781593934972	Lancer Books (original), BearManor Media (reprint)	1964 (original), September 26, 2013 (reprint)	Novelization of the film, released a year before its source material.

=== N ===
Title	Author	Catalog / ISBN	Publisher	Date	Notes
Night of the Living Dead	John A. Russo	0446764108 / 978-0446764100	Warner Paperback Library	1974	First installment in the Living Dead series, adapted from the first film.
Nightmare Pavilion	Andy Rausch	1-951036-21-2	Happy Cloud Publishing	2020	Novelization of the film Carnival of Souls (1962).
The Nightmares on Elm Street Parts 1, 2, 3: The Continuing Story (1987)	Jeffrey Cooper	0-312-90517-3/978-0-312-90517-0	St. Martin's Press	1987	First installment in the Nightmare on Elm Street series, adapted from the first film and the sequels Freddy's Revenge and Dream Warriors.
The Nightmares on Elm Street Parts 4 & 5	Joseph Locke	0-312-91764-3/978-0-312-91764-7	St. Martin's Press	1989	Second installment in the Nightmare on Elm Street series, adapted from the films The Dream Master and The Dream Child.

=== O ===
Title	Author	Catalog / ISBN	Publisher	Date	Notes
The Omen	David Seltzer	0-8600-7371-8	Futura Books (UK); Signet Books (US)	1976	First installment in the Omen series.

=== P ===
Title	Author	Catalog / ISBN	Publisher	Date	Notes
Piranha	John Sayles, Leo Callan	0450042790	New English Library	October 1978	
Prophecy	David Seltzer	0345286421 / 978-0345286420	Ballantine Books	1979	

=== R ===
Title	Author	Catalog / ISBN	Publisher	Date	Notes
Return of the Living Dead	John A. Russo	0099426102 / 9780099426103	Arrow Books	1985	Adapted by Russo from the screenplay of the 1985 film and unrelated to the earlier 1977 novel by the same author, which technically was the basis of the overall film.

=== S ===
Title	Author	Catalog / ISBN	Publisher	Date	Notes
Shocker	Randall Boyll	0425122638 / 978-0425122631	Berkley Books	September 1990	

=== T ===
Title	Author	Catalog / ISBN	Publisher	Date	Notes
Tales from the Crypt	Jack Oleck	0552674397 / 9780552674393	Bantam Books	April 1972	
Teddy	John Gault	0770415989	Bantam Books	1980	Novelization of the film The Pit, released a year before its source.
Two Thousand Maniacs!	Herschell Gordon Lewis	0938782088	Novel Books	1964	Novelization of the film.

=== V ===
Title	Author	Catalog / ISBN	Publisher	Date	Notes
Van Helsing	Kevin Ryan	0743493540	HarperCollins	2004	
The Vault of Horror	Jack Oleck	0553080105 / 9780553080100	Bantam Books	1973	

=== W ===
Title	Author	Catalog / ISBN	Publisher	Date	Notes
Wes Craven's New Nightmare	David Bergantino	0-812-55166-4/978-0-812-55166-2	Tor Books	1994	Third installment in the Nightmare on Elm Street series, adapted from the eighth film.
The Wicker Man	Robin Hardy, Anthony Shaffer	0307382761	Crown Publishing Group	1978	

== Science fiction films ==
=== 0–9 ===
Title	Author	Catalog / ISBN	Publisher	Date	Notes
12 Monkeys	Elizabeth Hand	0061056588	HarperPrism	1995	
2001: A Space Odyssey	Arthur C. Clarke	978-0-453-00269-1	Hutchinson (UK); New American Library (US)	1968	Though adapted from the eponymous film overall, the novel was developed concurrently with the film and was published after its release.

=== A ===
Title	Author	Catalog / ISBN	Publisher	Date	Notes
The Abyss	Orson Scott Card	0099690608 / 978-0099690603	Pocket Books	1989	

=== B ===
Title	Author	Catalog / ISBN	Publisher	Date	Notes
Back to the Future	George Gipe	0425082059	Berkley Books	1985	
Back to the Future Part II	0425118754	Craig Shaw Gardner	Berkley Books	1989	
Back to the Future Part III	0425122409	Craig Shaw Gardner	Berkley Books	1990	
Battle for the Planet of the Apes	David Gerrold	0891901639/978-0891901631	Award Books	1973	
Beneath the Planet of the Apes	Michael Avallone	0553080334/978-0553080339	Bantam Books	1970	
The Black Hole	Alan Dean Foster	0-345-29053-4/978-0-345-29053-3	Del Rey Books	December 1979	
Blade Runner: A Story of the Future	Les Martin	0-394-85303-2	Random House	1982	
Buckaroo Banzai	Earl Mac Rauch	0375841547	Pocket Books	1984	

=== C ===
Title	Author	Catalog / ISBN	Publisher	Date	Notes
Close Encounters of the Third Kind	Steven Spielberg, Leslie Waller	0-440-11433-0	Dell Books	1977	
Conquest of the Planet of the Apes	John Jakes	0095132414/978-0095132411	Award Books	1972	

=== D ===
Title	Author	Catalog / ISBN	Publisher	Date	Notes
Dark City	Frank Lauria	0312963432	St. Martin's Press	1998	
Demolition Man	Robert Tine	0451180798	E. P. Dutton	1993	
Dr. Cyclops	Henry Kuttner	Catalog: 445-02485-060 (1967 paperback); ISBN: 0-445-02485-2 / 978-0-445-02485-4 (1967 paperback); 0-87818-013-3 / 978-0-87818-013-4 (1976 paperback)	Stellar Publishing (original); Phoenix Press (1940 hardback); Popular Library (1967 paperback); Centaur Books (1976 paperback)	June 1940 (original)	First published as a installment in the Thrilling Wonder Stories pulp magazine (June 1940).

=== E ===
Title	Author	Catalog / ISBN	Publisher	Date	Notes
Escape from New York	Mike McQuay	0553149148	Bantam Books	1985	
Escape from the Planet of the Apes	Jerry Pournelle	?	Award Books	1971	
E.T. the Extra-Terrestrial	William Kotzwinkle	0425054535 / 9780425054536	Berkley Books	June 1982	

=== F ===
Title	Author	Catalog / ISBN	Publisher	Date	Notes
Futureworld	John Ryder Hall	0345255593 / 9780345255594	Ballantine Books	August 12, 1976	

=== G ===
Title	Author	Catalog / ISBN	Publisher	Date	Notes
Galaxy Quest	Terry Bisson	044100718X / 978-0441007189	Ace Books	1999	

=== J ===
Title	Author	Catalog / ISBN	Publisher	Date	Notes
Johnny Mnemonic	Terry Bisson	0671523007 / 978-0671523008	Pocket Books	1999	

=== M ===
Title	Author	Catalog / ISBN	Publisher	Date	Notes
Mad Max	Terry Kaye	0828260371	Circus Books	1979	
Mad Max 2	Carl Ruhan	0725511834	QB Books	1981	
Mad Max Beyond Thunderdome	Joan D. Vinge	0446329517	Warner Books	1985	
Mars Attacks!	Jonathan Gems	0451192567 / 978-0451192561	Signet Books	1996	
Men in Black	Steve Perry	0553577565	Bantam Books	1997	
Meteor	Edmund H. North, Franklin Coen	0-446-82848-3	Warner Books	October 1979	
My Science Project	Mike McQuay	0553253786 / 978-0553253788	Bantam Books	1985	

=== P ===
Title	Author	Catalog / ISBN	Publisher	Date	Notes
Pacific Rim	Alex Irvine	9781781166789	Titan Books	2013	
Plan 9 from Outer Space	Matthew Ewald	1523689307	Darkstone Productions, LLC	2016	

=== R ===
Title	Author	Catalog / ISBN	Publisher	Date	Notes
Re-Animator	Jeff Rovin	0671637231	Pocket Books	1987	
RoboCop	Ed Naha	0440174791	Dell Publishing	1986	

=== S ===
Title	Author	Catalog / ISBN	Publisher	Date	Notes
Saturn 3	Steve Gallagher	0722137621 / 978-0722137628	Sphere Books	1980	
Short Circuit	Colin Wedgelock	0722170351 / 978-0722170359	Sphere Books	1986	
Species	Yvonne Navarro	0-553-57404-3	Bantam Books	1995	First installment in the Species series.
Species II	Yvonne Navarro	0-812-57075-8	Tom Doherty Associates, LLC	1998	Second installment in the Species series.
Star Trek	Alan Dean Foster	978-1-4391-5886-9	Simon & Schuster	May 2009	
Star Trek: The Motion Picture	Gene Roddenberry	0-671-25324-7 (hardback); 0-671-83088-0 (paperback)	Pocket Books	December 1979	
Star Wars: From the Adventures of Luke Skywalker	Alan Dean Foster (credited to George Lucas)	0-345-26061-9	Ballantine Books	November 12, 1976	
Star Wars: The Clone Wars	Karen Traviss	034550898X	Del Rey Books	July 26, 2008	

=== T ===
Title	Author	Catalog / ISBN	Publisher	Date	Notes
The Terminator	Randall Frakes, William Wisher Jr.	0553253174	Spectra Books	1985	
THX 1138	Ben Bova	0446897116 / 978-0446897112	Paperback Library	1971	
Total Recall	Piers Anthony	0688052096	Arrow Books	1989	

=== V ===
Title	Author	Catalog / ISBN	Publisher	Date	Notes
Videodrome	Jack Martin	0821711660 / 978-0821711668	Kensington Pub Corp	1987	
Virus	S. D. Perry	0812541588 / 978-0812541588	Paperback Library	1999	

== Superhero films ==
=== B ===
Title	Author	Catalog / ISBN	Publisher	Date	Notes
Batman	Craig Shaw Gardner	Warner Books	0446354872 / 9780446354875	June 1989	
Batman & Robin	Michael Jan Friedman	Warner Books	0446604585 / 9780446604581	June 1997	
Batman Begins	Dennis O'Neil	Del Rey Books	0345479467 / 9780345479464	June 2005	
Batman Forever	Peter David	Warner Books	0446602175 / 9780446602174	June 1995	
Batman Returns	Craig Shaw Gardner	Warner Books	0749313455 / 9780749313456	July 1992	

=== C ===
Title	Author	Catalog / ISBN	Publisher	Date	Notes
Condorman (US)	Joe Claro	059032022X / 978-0590320221 (original); 0590721577 / 978-0590721578 (reprint)	Scholastic Book Services	1981	American novelization.
Condorman (UK)	Heather Simon	0450052605 / 978-0450052606	New English Library	1981	British novelization.

=== D ===
Title	Author	Catalog / ISBN	Publisher	Date	Notes
The Dark Knight	Dennis O'Neil	Berkley	0425222861 / 9780425222867	July 2008	
The Dark Knight Rises	Greg Cox	Titan Books	9781781161067	July 2012	
Darkman	Randall Boyll	0515103780	Jove	1990	

=== M ===
Title	Author	Catalog / ISBN	Publisher	Date	Notes
Man of Steel	Greg Cox	Titan Books	1781165998	June 2013	

=== S ===
Title	Author	Catalog / ISBN	Publisher	Date	Notes
Steel	Dean Wesley Smith	Tor Books	0812539311 / 9780812539318	July 1997	
Supergirl	Norma Fox Mazer	Warner Books	0446323675 / 9780446323673	November 1984	
Superman III	William Kotzwinkle	Warner Books	0446306991 / 9780446306997	June 1983	

=== T ===
Title	Author	Catalog / ISBN	Publisher	Date	Notes
The Toxic Avenger: The Novel	Lloyd Kaufman, Adam Jahnke	1560258705	Running Press	2006	

=== W ===
Title	Author	Catalog / ISBN	Publisher	Date	Notes
Wonder Woman	Nancy Holder	Titan Books	1785653784 / 978-1785653780	June 2017	

== Thriller films ==
=== F ===
Title	Author	Catalog / ISBN	Publisher	Date	Notes
Freshwater	Julian Michael Carver	1922551945	Severed Press	2021	

=== J ===
Title	Author	Catalog / ISBN	Publisher	Date	Notes
Jaws 2	Hank Searls	0-553-11708-4	Bantam Books	1978	Sequel to Jaws (1975).
Jaws: The Revenge	Hank Searls	0-425-10546-6	Berkley Books	1987	Second sequel to Jaws (1975); Jaws 3-D (1983) was never novelized.

== Western films ==
=== A ===
Title	Author	Catalog / ISBN	Publisher	Date	Notes
The Apple Dumpling Gang Rides Again	Gary Poole	0441025854 / 9780441025855	Ace Books	June 1979	Sequel to The Apple Dumpling Gang (1975).

=== B ===
Title	Author	Catalog / ISBN	Publisher	Date	Notes
Blazing Saddles	Tad Richards	0446765368	Warner Paperback Library	1974	

=== F ===
Title	Author	Catalog / ISBN	Publisher	Date	Notes
A Fistful of Dollars	Frank Chandler	042606402X / 9780426064022	Tandem	1972	First installment in the Man with No Name series.
For a Few Dollars More	Joe Millard	0426013611 / 9780426013617	Award Books	1965	Second installment in the Man with No Name series.

=== G ===
Title	Author	Catalog / ISBN	Publisher	Date	Notes
The Good, the Bad and the Ugly	Joe Millard	042613995X / 9780426139959	Award Books	1967	Third installment in the Man with No Name series.

=== H ===
Title	Author	Catalog / ISBN	Publisher	Date	Notes
Hot Lead and Cold Feet	Ted Sparks	0590120638 / 9780590120630	Scholastic Book Services	1978	

== Others ==
- Avatharam (1995)
- Kadhal Kottai
- The Legend of the Lone Ranger
- Malliswari (1951)

=== Animation ===
Title	Author	Catalog / ISBN	Publisher	Date	Notes
All Dogs Go to Heaven	Andrea Kaminsky	0816719950 / 9780816719952	Watermill Press	1989	
All Dogs Go to Heaven 2	Ron Fontes, Justine Korman	0816737908 / 9780816737901	Troll Communications LLC	April 1996	Sequel to All Dogs Go to Heaven (1989).
An American Tail: Fievel Goes West	Cathy East Dubowski	0448402106 / 9780448402109	Grosset & Dunlap	October 31, 1991	
The Fox and the Hound	Heather Simon	0671442910 / 9780671442910	Archway Paperbacks	December 1981	
Lady and the Tramp: The Story of Two Dogs	Ward Greene	53-10818	Simon & Schuster	1953	Published two years before the release of the source film.
The Story of Walt Disney's Motion Picture The Jungle Book	Mary Virginia Carey	2726	Whitman Publishing Company	1967	Young adult novelization.
Rock-a-Doodle	Chip Lovitt	081672475X / 9780816724758	Watermill Press	1992	
Tom and Jerry: The Movie	Stephanie Calmenson	0590471155 / 9780590471152	Scholastic	July 1993	

=== Blaxploitation ===
Title	Author	Catalog / ISBN	Publisher	Date	Notes
Coffy	Paul W. Fairman	75487-095	Lancer Books	1973	
Super Fly	Philip Fenty	034502818X	Sphere Books	1972	

=== Children's ===
Title	Author	Catalog / ISBN	Publisher	Date	Notes
Walt Disney's Alice in Wonderland (1977)	Ann Spano	0450032787 / 9780450032783 (UK)	New English Library (UK); Wonder Books (US)	February 3, 1977 (UK)	Junior novelization.
The Aristocats (1986)	Victoria Crenson	0816708878	Ottenheimer Publishers	1986	Junior novelization.
Honey, I Shrunk the Kids	Bonnie Bryant Hiller, Neil W. Hiller	0590421190 / 9780590421195	Scholastic, Inc.	1989	Junior novelization.
The Iron Giant	James Preller	0439086345	Scholastic Corporation	1999	Junior novelization.
Walt Disney's The Jungle Book (1978)	Jean Bethell	0448161079 / 9780448161075	Wonder Books (1978); Ottenheimer Publishers (1984)	1978, 1984	Junior novelization.
Kubo and the Two Strings	Sadie Chesterfield	0316361445	Little, Brown and Company	2016	
Walt Disney's Lady and the Tramp (1986)	Victoria Crenson	0816708886	Ottenheimer Publishers	1986	Junior novelization.
Mulan	Cathy East Dubowski	0786842229	Disney Press	1998	Junior novelization.
ParaNorman	Elizabeth Cody Kimmel	0316231851	Little, Brown Books for Young Readers	2012	
Return to Oz (1986)	Alistair Hedley	0140319573 / 9780140319576	Puffin Books	1986	Junior novelization; published as part of the "Young Puffin" series.
Song of the South	Victoria Crenson	0816708886	Ottenheimer Publishers	1986	Junior novelization.
Space Jam	Francine Hughes	0590945556 / 978-0590945554	Scholastic Corporation	1996	
The Three Caballeros	Jimmy Corinis	0450028062 / 9780450028069	New English Library	February 5, 1976	Second novelization.
Who Framed Roger Rabbit	Justine Korman	0140341889	Puffin Books	1988	Junior novelization.
Zootopia	Suzanne Francis	0736433945	Disney Press	2016	Junior novelization.

=== Disaster ===
Title	Author	Catalog / ISBN	Publisher	Date	Notes
Airport 1975	Linda Stewart	None	Universal-Award House	1975	Second installment in the Airport series.
Airport '77	Michael Scheff, David Spector	0425034828 / 9780425034828	Berkley Books	April 1977	Third installment in the Airport series.
Earthquake	George Fox	0-451-06264-7 / 978-0-451-06264-2	Signet Books	December 1974	

=== Kaiju ===
Title	Author	Catalog / ISBN	Publisher	Date	Notes
Monster Godzilla	Shigeru Kayama	[none] (original)	Iwatani Bookstore	October 25, 1954	Novelization of the film Godzilla (1954).

== See also ==
- Lists of comics based on media
  - List of comics based on fiction
  - List of comics based on television programs
  - List of comics based on unproduced film projects
  - List of comics based on video games
  - List of comics based on films
- Lists of films based on media
  - Lists of works of fiction made into feature films
  - List of short fiction made into feature films
  - List of films based on poems
  - List of films based on comics
  - List of films based on comic strips
  - List of films based on manga
  - List of films based on magazine articles
  - List of films based on toys
  - List of films based on radio series
  - List of films based on video games
  - List of films based on television programs
  - List of films based on film books
  - Lists of films based on books
  - List of live-action films based on cartoons and comics
- Lists of Video games based on media
  - List of video games based on films
  - List of video games based on comics
  - List of video games based on cartoons
- Lists of television programs based on media
  - List of television programs based on films
  - List of television programs based on comics
  - List of television series based on video games
  - List of television series based on comic strips
- Lists of novels based on comics
  - List of novels based on comics
  - List of novels based on video games
  - List of novels based on films
