= Cursed =

Cursed or The Cursed may refer to:

- Curse, an expressed wish that some form of adversity will befall another

== Films ==
- Cursed (2004 film), a Japanese horror film by Yoshihiro Hoshino
- Cursed (2005 film), an American horror comedy film directed by Wes Craven
- The Cursed (2021 film), an American-French horror film directed by Sean Ellis
- The Cursed: Dead Man's Prey, a 2021 South Korean adaptation of the 2020 South Korean TV series
- The Cursed (2025 film), a South Korean horror film directed by Hong Won-ki

== Music ==
- Cursed (band), a 2001–2008 Canadian hardcore punk band
- Cursed (Ion Dissonance album) or the title song, 2010
- Cursed (Morgoth album) or the title song, 1991
- Cursed (Paleface Swiss album), 2025
- Cursed (Righteous Vendetta album) or the title song, 2017
- Cursed (Rotten Sound album), 2011
- Cursed (Scaramanga Six album), 2011
- "Cursed", a song by King Princess from Hold On Baby, 2022
- "Cursed", a song by Robbie Williams from Escapology, 2002

== Television ==
=== Series ===
- Cursed (2000 TV series), a 2000–2001 American sitcom
- Cursed (2020 TV series), a streaming television series
- The Cursed (TV series), a 2020 South Korean TV series

=== Episodes ===
- "Cursed!" (Amphibia), 2019
- "Cursed!" (The Casagrandes), 2020
- "Cursed" (Freelancers), 2019
- "Cursed" (Hi Hi Puffy AmiYumi), 2005
- "Cursed" (House), 2005

== Other uses ==
- Cursed (Buffy/Angel novel), a 2003 original novel based on the TV series Buffy the Vampire Slayer and Angel
- Cursed, a 2012 Alex Verus novel by Benedict Jacka
- Cursed!, a 2020 play by Kodie Bedford

== See also ==
- Curse (disambiguation)
- Cursed image, an Internet meme
- Accursed (disambiguation)
- Profanity
