= Sacrifice (The Secret Circle) =

- The Secret Circle episode
- The Circle with John Blackwell (Joe Lando) at the abandoned house
- Episode no.: Season 1 Episode 18
- Directed by: Nick Copus
- Written by: David Ehrman
- Production code: 2J6268
- Original air date: March 29, 2012

Guest appearances
- Joe Lando; Tim Phillipps; Brett Dier; Chad Rook; Sammi Rotibi

Episode chronology
← Previous "Curse"	Next → "Crystal"

"Sacrifice" is the 18th episode of the first season of the CW television series The Secret Circle, and the series' 18th episode overall. It was aired on March 29, 2012. The episode was written by David Ehrman and it was directed by Nick Copus.

== Plot ==
Cassie (Britt Robertson) and Adam (Thomas Dekker) are trying to adjust to the new reality for them after drinking the elixir. Cassie did not tell anyone that she still feels the same about him and Adam is mad because he remembers the moments he spent with Cassie but he cannot remember how it felt being in love with her.

A witch hunter named Samuel (Chad Rook) gets into Jake's (Chris Zylka) room and when Jake sees him they start to fight. Cassie sees them from the window and comes to help Jake. Samuel tells them that he wants to see Blackwell (Joe Lando) because he has a message for him about Eben (Sammi Rotibi) and his plans.

Cassie and Jake inform Blackwell and Samuel tells him that Eben is trying to resurrect the demons he had summoned sixteen years ago by making a human sacrifice. When Blackwell says that Eben cannot do that because he is not a witch, Samuel informs him that he has a witch working with him but he does not know who it is.

Meanwhile, Grant (Tim Phillipps) is back in town and Diana (Shelley Hennig) is going on a date with him. During the date she discovers that he lied to her about who he is and she leaves him. Later, he comes to ask for a second chance to prove her that he really cares about her and Diana gives him one day to fix his lie.

Faye (Phoebe Tonkin) and Melissa (Jessica Parker Kennedy) are trying to get Kyle's (Brett Dier) attention, a hockey player, at the Boathouse and Adam is helping them using magic. When Kyle's girlfriend appears, Adam is getting on a fight with him. Faye and Melissa stop him not knowing what's going on with him.

Blackwell tells Cassie and Jake to gather the Circle so they can stop Eben and to meet him at the abandoned house. The Circle goes to the house but Blackwell is not there. They realize that he did not want them to confront Eben to protect them, so they leave to find him.

While Blackwell is trying to deal with Samuel, who already has a demon inside him, Eben appears and he knocks him down. He then starts the ritual to summon the demons. The Circle gets there and tries to purge Samuel but they cannot. Blackwell uses his magic to save them and to kill Samuel.

Eben, in the meantime, has already got what he wanted and runs away. When the Circle tries to follow him, Blackwell stops them because Eben is to strong now that he has the demons inside him and he knows that the Circle is not strong enough to fight him.

They all go back to the abandoned house where Blackwell explains them that the only way to stop Eben is with six crystals. Each family has one and they have to find them. The Circle agrees and this time, they all trust and believe that Blackwell only wants to protect and help them.

== Reception ==
=== Ratings ===
In its original American broadcast, "Sacrifice" was watched by 1.33 million; down 0.41 from the previous episode.

=== Reviews ===
"Sacrifice" received positive reviews.

Katherine Miller from The A.V. Club gave a B+ rate to the episode saying that The Secret Circle is a weird patchwork of a show. ""Sacrifice" drags the audience through this and that thing—a third-grade Little League pizza party for the hockey team, Cassie making lattes, some witch hunter shenanigans of middling interest—only to sweep up all the disparate elements in time for a chase through some long grass in the dead of night, to an old ritual ground where the family Blackwell lights a demonic witch hunter on fire and makes his head explode."

Carissa Pavlica from TV Fanatic rated the episode with 4.2/5.

The TV Chick review stated: "It’s coming down to the home stretch and the last two episodes of Secret Circle have been hitting it out of the park. The show is finally barreling toward an ending and the sight of that finish line has helped solve the lack of focus that plagued it earlier in the year."

== Feature music ==
In the episode "Sacrifice" we can hear the songs:

- "You Wish You Were Red" by Trailer Trash Tracys
- "Boom Boom" by Donora
- "A Reason to Give Up" by Howl Baby Howl
- "You're Mine" by Devin
- "Meet Your Maker" by The Big Sleep
- "Tuck The Darkness In" by Bowerbirds
- "Homecoming" by The Duke Spirit
