= Prom (The Secret Circle) =

- The Secret Circle episode
- Cassie (Britt Robertson) and Diana (Shelley Hennig) time travel to find the last crystal
- Episode no.: Season 1 Episode 21
- Directed by: Alex Zakrzewski
- Written by: Holly Henderson; Don Whitehead
- Production code: 2J6271
- Original air date: May 3, 2012

Guest appearances
- Joe Lando; Tim Phillipps; Andrea Brooks; Elise Gatien; Chad Willett; Sammi Rotibi

Episode chronology
← Previous "Traitor"	Next → "Family"

"Prom" is the 21st episode of the first season of the CW television series The Secret Circle, and the series' 21st episode overall. It was aired on May 3, 2012. The episode was written by Holly Henderson & Don Whitehead and it was directed by Alex Zakrzewski.

== Plot ==
After the discovery that Nick (Louis Hunter) is alive, the members of the Circle are divided with Jake (Chris Zylka) saying that this is not the Nick they know and they have to kill him and Melissa (Jessica Parker Kennedy) saying that they should help him.

Blackwell (Joe Lando) keeps telling everyone that they need the crystals so they can put them together and make the Crystal Skull. They need to find the last crystal. They know it's at school after Adam (Thomas Dekker) uncloaked it, but they don't know where exactly. Blackwell tells Cassie she can use her dark magic to go back in time and see where Adam's grandfather (Chad Willett) hide it.

Cassie is trying the spell but she can't see much, so she asks Diana's (Shelley Hennig) help. Diana, after learning that she is Blackwell's daughter is trying to stay away from him and his plans because she doesn't trust him. Cassie manages to convince her to do the spell together and when they do they discover some more things about Blackwell.

Cassie and Diana see Amelia (Andrea Brooks) talking to Elizabeth (Elise Gatien) and they find out that Amelia knew what Blackwell was planning and she was trying to stop it by taking Cassie away. It's also revealed to Cassie and Diana that Blackwell planned for all the six pregnancies of their parents so the kids could grow up together and he would be able to build his own Circle.

After everything they learn, Diana leaves Cassie alone accusing her that Blackwell is in their lives because she was the one who let him in just like her mother did sixteen years ago. Cassie doesn't trust her father anymore, but she can't understand what he is trying to do with the Circle. She knows though that they have to get the last crystal and not give it to him.

Nick hears where the last crystal is and he takes it. The members of the Circle chase him once again to take it back. They follow him to a place where he meets Eben (Sammi Rotibi) and they see that Nick is trying to exchange the crystal with the demon he has inside him because it keeps him alive.

In the meantime, Faye (Phoebe Tonkin) invites Jake to the prom despite the fact that he stood her up two years earlier. The attend together and they are starting to get closer again.

Blackwell, realizing that Charles (Gale Harold) is getting in his way because of the bond Diana has with him, attempts to break Diana's loyalty to her father. Dawn (Natasha Henstridge) is trying to warn Charles after her failed attempt to stop Blackwell but she doesn't have much of luck. Blackwell is using magic to haunt Charles with Amelia's death. When Diana gets home, she finds him scared and confused and when Charles tells her what he did, Diana runs away from him.

The episode ends with the Circle and Blackwell encounter with Eben and Nick. The encounter leads to Melissa being the one who kills Nick to save Jake, Blackwell getting the last crystal and Eben kidnapping Faye.

== Reception ==
=== Ratings ===
In its original American broadcast, "Prom" was watched by 1.23 million; up 0.08 from the previous episode.

=== Reviews ===
"Prom" received generally positive reviews.

Katherine Miller from The A.V. Club gave a B+ rate to the episode. "After last week’s chase for the crystals, “Prom” slows things down to idle, passes through the ol’ navigational buoys of finale set-up, and then accelerates into a whole series of emotional revelations, confrontations, and the kidnapping of everyone’s favorite character."

Carissa Pavlica from TV Fanatic rated the episode with 4.8/5 saying that this was a strong episode. "From one moment to the next, it's like Blackwell is a ping pong ball going back and forth. One minute I'm certain he's completely evil, and the next I sense good in him. Perhaps the end game will be that he lies somewhere in between, as do we all. The game they are playing with him is freaking fantastic, though. Not being able to determine the truth just makes The Secret Circle all the more compelling."

Sarah Maines from The TV Chick stated that the episode continued the show’s streak of improved episodes. "Secret Circle isn’t perfect, but over the past 5 or 6 episodes the show has found a nice groove and was able to course correct some of the major problems with the first half of the season. It’s a shame that next week’s episode will probably be its last, but at least it’s going out on top!"

== Feature music ==
In the episode "Prom" we can hear the songs:

- "Get It Right" by Adam Oliver
- "Rain Delay" by Tanlines
- "What We're Doing" by The Danks
- "Only Happy When It Rains" by Garbage
- "Mine to Take" by Valida
- "Nonesuch" by Tanlines
