= Traitor (The Secret Circle) =

- The Secret Circle episode
- Cassie (Britt Robertson) and Diana (Shelley Hennig) surprised after seeing who the traitor is
- Episode no.: Season 1 Episode 20
- Directed by: Eagle Egilsson
- Written by: Roger Grant; Katie Wech
- Production code: 2J6270
- Original air date: April 26, 2012

Guest appearances
- Joe Lando; Richard Harmon; Louis Hunter

Episode chronology
← Previous "Crystal"	Next → "Prom"

"Traitor" is the 20th episode of the first season of the CW television series The Secret Circle, and the series' 20th episode overall. It was aired on April 26, 2012. The episode was written by Roger Grant & Katie Wech and it was directed by Eagle Egilsson.

== Plot ==
After Jane's (Ashley Crow) wake, the Circle and especially Cassie (Britt Robertson) wants to kill the witch hunters more than ever, since Blackwell (Joe Lando) told everyone that the witch hunters were those who killed Jane. They have the four crystals and they need two more so they can create the Crystal Skull which will give them the power to destroy the witch hunters.

Diana (Shelley Hennig) is frustrated after what she learns about her being Blackwell's daughter and she doesn't want to believe it. She asks her father Charles (Gale Harold) about it and Charles tells her that there was a time of a few weeks that he and Elizabeth had broken up but then they were back together. No matter what, he is her father because he is the one who raised her and he asks her not to listen to Blackwell and not to do whatever he tells them.

Faye (Phoebe Tonkin) and Jake (Chris Zylka) find Dawn's (Natasha Henstridge) crystal and they bring it to the rest of the Circle. When the crystal is magically stolen in front of their eyes, they figure that the person who stole it is the traitor witch who's working with Eben. Jake says that they should contact Isaac to ask for his help. The Circle has its doubts about it and Diana tells everyone that they should probably not blindly trust Blackwell.

They go to the meeting but instead of Isaac, another witch hunter named Ian (Richard Harmon) appears. Ian tells them that Isaac is dead, Eben killed him because he had turned against him. Ian also tells them that the witch ran away after Eben summoned the demons, since he was no longer needed Eben was going to kill him.

The four of them, Cassie, Jake, Faye and Diana, decide to trace down the traitor and find out who he is. Their tracking leads them to "The Creepiest Place on Earth" where they find Ian and other witch hunters dead.

In the meantime, Melissa (Jessica Parker Kennedy) and Adam (Thomas Dekker) team up to find Adam's family crystal. While they are searching, Adam remembers a magic trick his grandfather used to do with his lucky coin and they believe that he did it to the crystal too. He was cloaking and uncloaking the coin and Adam uses the trick to uncloak the crystal. After the uncloaking, they use the crystal-locating map and they find out that the last crystal is somewhere in the school.

Charles calls Blackwell to meet him. When they meet, Charles warns Blackwell to stay away from his daughter. They end up fighting and Charles tells him that he will take Diana away from Chance Harbor so he won't see her again and to stop his plans. Blackwell, goes to Dawn to ask for her help and she agrees to talk to Charles.

The episode ends at "The Creepiest Place on Earth" where Jake and Faye find a picture of Jake's parents in the traitor's stuff and wonder why the traitor would have it. Cassie and Diana are chasing the traitor and Cassie uses her dark magic to stop him. They take the crystal back and they find out that the traitor is Nick (Louis Hunter) who is supposed to be dead.

== Reception ==
=== Ratings ===
In its original American broadcast, "Traitor" was watched by 1.15 million; slightly up by 0.01 from the previous episode.

=== Reviews ===
"Traitor" received generally positive reviews.

Katherine Miller from The A.V. Club gave an A rate to the episode saying that the show is finally paying off and that's awesome. "From the starting pistol on, “Traitor” nails everything Secret Circle could be and should be. This, here, this is a mini-horror movie that amps up suspense, distorts our ever-shifting perceptions of who can be trusted, coughs up a grotesque image, and peppers the whole brew with emotional confrontation and a serious sense of humor. It’s finally paying off."

Carissa Pavlica from TV Fanatic rated the episode with 4.5/5 saying that even before the opening credits she was satisfied with the episode. "Before the opening credits of "Traitor," I was already well satisfied with this episode of The Secret Circle. It only went up from there; little did I know how much!"

Sarah Maines from The TV Chick stated that the show is stepping it up. "Secret Circle has really been stepping it up for the last few episodes, and I can't wait to see the fallout from this Nick's reappearance! Also, Faye's dialogue was pitch perfect this week. More please."

Tyler Olson from Crimson Tear stated that the show finally starts reaching the quality it deserves. "After the last few episodes, it looks this series is finally starting to reach the quality it deserves. Certainly things are going to go very wrong once they form the crystal skull, and with John's true motives still hidden from them, I expect there will be more bloodshed before this season is over."

== Feature music ==
In the episode "Traitor" we can hear the songs:

- "Go Right Ahead" by The Hives
- "Blood For Poppies" by Garbage
