= The Curse =

The Curse may refer to:

== Film and television ==
- The Curse (1924 film), an Austrian silent film directed by Robert Land
- The Curse (film series), a 1987–1993 American horror film series
  - The Curse (1987 film), the first film in the series, directed by David Keith
- Noroi: The Curse, a 2005 Japanese horror film directed by Kōji Shiraishi
- The Curse (American TV series), a 2023 comedy series
- The Curse (British TV series), a 2022 comedy drama

=== Television episodes ===
- "The Curse" (The Amazing World of Gumball), 2012
- "The Curse" (Craig of the Creek), 2018
- "The Curse" (NCIS), 2003
- "The Curse" (Reservation Dogs), 2022
- "The Curse" (Stargate SG-1), 2000
- "The Curse" (Swamp Thing), 1992
- "The Curse" (What We Do in the Shadows), 2020

== Literature ==
- The Curse (Angel comic), a 2005 collection of comics based on the TV series Angel
- "The Curse" (Clarke story), a 1953 short story by Arthur C. Clarke
- "The Curse" (Dubus story), a 1988 short story by Albert Dubus
- The Curse, a 1977 novel by Charles L. Grant
- The Curse, a 1913 novel by Fergus Hume
- The Curse, a 1997 novel by Bill Myers, the seventh book of his fiction series Forbidden Doors
- The Curse: Cubs Win! Cubs Win! Or Do They?, a 2010 novel by Andy Van Slyke and Rob Rains

== Music ==
- The Curse (Atreyu album), 2004
- The Curse (Omen album) or the title song, 1986
- The Curse (EP), by Napalm Death, or the title song, 1988
- The Curse, an album by E-Force, 2014
- "The Curse", a song by Audioslave from Out of Exile, 2005
- "The Curse", a song by Disturbed from Indestructible, 2008
- “The Curse”, a live album by Throwing Muses, 1992

== Other uses ==
- The Curse (Call of Cthulhu), a 1990 role-playing game adventure
- Menstruation, known euphemistically as "The Curse"

== See also ==
- Curse (disambiguation)
