= Family (The Secret Circle) =

- The Secret Circle episode
- Charles (Gale Harold) "sacrificing" himself to save the Circle
- Episode no.: Season 1 Episode 22
- Directed by: Dave Barrett
- Written by: Andrew Miller; Andrea Newman
- Production code: 2J6272
- Original air date: May 10, 2012

Guest appearances
- Joe Lando; Tim Phillipps; Sammi Rotibi; Stepfanie Kramer

Episode chronology
← Previous "Prom"	Next → —

"Family" is the 22nd and the last episode of the first season of the CW television series The Secret Circle, and the series' 22nd and last episode overall. It was aired on May 10, 2012. The episode was written by Andrew Miller & Andrea Newman and it was directed by Dave Barrett.

One day after the final episode was aired, on May 11, 2012, the CW cancelled the series. The ratings decline in the second half of the season, the expensive cost of special effects, and dramatic locations were cited as reasons for the show's cancellation.

== Plot ==
Faye (Phoebe Tonkin) is in the hands of the witch hunters and the Circle is trying to find a way to save her. They disagree if they should listen to Blackwell (Joe Lando) and build the Crystal Skull or if they should try to save her with the Circle's power. When Eben (Sammi Rotibi) calls he asks for one of the crystals so they won't be able to build the Crystal Skull. They decide to help Blackwell build it, use it to kill the witch hunters, save Faye, and then decide what they should do with Blackwell.

Cassie (Britt Robertson) and Diana (Shelley Hennig) go to meet Blackwell. He informs them that to build the Skull, they should first destroy the family crystals so they can reform into it. When that is done, their Circle will be unbound. Diana reacts when she hears that but Cassie says it's the only way to kill the witch hunters and save Faye. They go ahead and do the ritual.

The Crystal Skull is now formed and Cassie denies giving it to Blackwell saying that she wants to be the one who will kill Eben. Blackwell's persistence makes her ask him why she can't do it since they have the same goal and Blackwell reveals that killing Eben is not his goal. He uses his magic to knockout Diana and Cassie and takes the Skull.

In the meantime, Charles (Gale Harold) tells Dawn (Natasha Henstridge) that Amelia is haunting him and she tells him that it was Blackwell who did that so he can make Diana run away from him. They both realize that what Blackwell is trying to do will hurt their kids, especially when they can't find Diana or Faye. They know that the only way to defeat Blackwell and the witch hunters is by getting their power back.

Charles calls his mother Kate (Stepfanie Kramer) to come and help them. When Kate comes, Dawn gets a phone call from Faye who's telling her that she is captive at the boat and she needs help. Charles and Dawn inform Kate what is happening and they ask her to give them their power back. Kate tells them that their power was destroyed after it was taken away from them and it can't be restored, so she decides to give them hers.

Meanwhile, Adam (Thomas Dekker), Melissa (Jessica Parker Kennedy) and Jake (Chris Zylka) are outside the boat waiting for Cassie and Diana to come so they can save Faye. When Jake attempts to get on the boat alone, Adam stops him with magic. They realize that they have their individual magic back which means the Circle is no longer bound, but they can't understand why. Trying to figure out what is going on, Adam leaves to go back to Cassie and Diana while Melissa and Jake get on the boat to find Faye.

Melissa and Jake find Faye but before they can get off the boat, Eben gets all three of them. He ties them up and tries to burn them. At that moment, Charles and Dawn arrive. Charles is using a spell to get the demons out of Eben while Dawn is putting out the fire and saves the three kids. The demons get out of Eben but get inside Charles. Not having the demons to protect him anymore, Eben is powerless and Jake kills him.

Dawn, Faye and Melissa see Charles and see that he has the demons inside him. Charles asks Dawn to tell Diana that he loves her and he jumps into the sea.

Back in the abandoned house, Blackwell is trying to complete his plans. Cassie and Diana wake up and try to escape but they can't because Blackwell formed a circle around them that is not allowing them to get out of it. They are trying to understand what he is doing when Blackwell is casting a spell into the Crystal Skull that turns it to black. Cassie asks him since he is not using the Skull to kill witch hunters, what is he using it for, he says to kill witches without Balcoin blood. Blackwell proceeds to tell them about what he wanted to do since the beginning. He wants to form a Circle with only Balcoin kids and there are four more coming who grew up in other cities with other Circles. A dark Circle is more powerful than even the Crystal Skull.

Adam gets to the house and tries to get the Skull but Blackwell knocks him across the room. The Skull has already started affecting all the witches and when Cassie sees Adam, she tries to get out of the circle but her power is not enough to destroy the spell. She needs Diana's power too and to make Diana activate her dark magic she tries to kill her. Diana's magic forces them out of the circle that John trapped them in. Cassie takes the Skull and tries to reverse the spell. Blackwell fights back with his magic, but when Diana unites her power with Cassie's, he can't fight them and they kill him.

The whole Circle gathers at Cassie's home discussing what they should do now. They decide that they have to destroy the Skull and they ask Adam to do it because he is the most trustworthy for that. Cassie tries to convince them to re-bind the Circle but the others don't agree with that since all the bad things started happening after they bound the Circle. Diana tells everyone that she needs to stay away from all of this for a while and that she is leaving town. Cassie's attempt to change her mind doesn't work.

The series ends with Kate casting a spell on Charles to put him to sleep; Faye and Melissa celebrating getting their solo magic back and being alive; Adam having the Skull that seems to be taking over him with its power; Cassie having the Balcoin mark on her palm and using her magic to ignite a fireplace; Diana also having the Balcoin mark on her palm and leaving town with Grant (Tim Phillipps); Jake receiving a package from his grandfather with the note: "The Circles are coming together. Your fight is far from over. Grandpa Royce" and four strangers with the Balcoin mark on their palms getting into town.

== Reception ==
=== Ratings ===
In its original American broadcast, "Family" was watched by 1.28 million; up 0.05 from the previous episode.

=== Reviews ===
"Family" received generally positive reviews.

Katherine Miller from The A.V. Club gave a B rate to the episode likening it to a rollercoaster but it finishes strong saying that "That's how you end a season". "The episode’s kind of fitting, actually, as the season finale to The Secret Circle, an up-and-down show that performed best with traditional horror elements and a set of increasingly complex dynamics between its various characters."

Carissa Pavlica from TV Fanatic rated the episode with 5/5 saying that The Secret Circle didn't go out with a whimper and the finale of the season opened a whole new era for the show that she would tune in to the second season without hesitation. "Yes, I'm making fun of some of the silly possibilities, but it was an excellent finale to a really well thought out season. With a little bump in the road just before the mid season break, things came back under control and on a perfect path for maximum entertainment. No matter what happens with The Secret Circle I will not regret any of the 22 hours I spent watching it. It was great suspense and fun!"

Sarah Maines from The TV Chick stated: "It’s been a rough year for everyone in Chance Harbor, but in the season finale we finally get to see our favorites triumph over the evil John Blackwell. Oh, and Eben was there too. Vengeance! [...] If the show does end up returning for a second season, this finale has really given the writers a lot of great places to go."

== Feature music ==
In the episode "Family" we can hear the songs:

- "Amongster" by Polica
- "Vessel" by Zola Jesus
- "We Are Fire" by Sharon Van Etten
- "Skin Graph" by Silversun Pickups
