= Accursed =

Accursed or The Accursed may refer to:

- The Accursed (Oates novel), 2013
- The Accursed, a 1994 book by Robert E. Vardeman
- The Accursed, a 2013 book by Antony Cutler
- Thor, God of Thunder: The Accursed, a comic book by Jason Aaron
- The Traitor, 1957 British drama film also known as The Accursed
- The Accursed, 2021 horror film
- Accursed Mountains, a mountain range in Albania
- Accursed (Centuria), fictional character in the Japanese web manga Centuria

== See also ==
- List of people known as the Accursed
- Cursed (disambiguation)
