= Crystal (The Secret Circle) =

- The Secret Circle episode
- Jane (Ashley Crow) and Charles (Gale Harold) trying to kill John Blackwell (Joe Lando)
- Episode no.: Season 1 Episode 19
- Directed by: Omar Madha
- Written by: Micah Schraft
- Production code: 2J6269
- Original air date: April 19, 2012

Guest appearances
- Joe Lando; Tim Phillipps; John De Lancie; Michael Graziadei

Episode chronology
← Previous "Sacrifice"	Next → "Traitor"

"Crystal" is the 19th episode of the first season of the CW television series The Secret Circle, and the series' 19th episode overall. It was aired on April 19, 2012. The episode was written by Micah Schraft and it was directed by Omar Madha.

== Plot ==
The Circle members are looking for the rest of the crystals that Blackwell (Joe Lando) told them about. While Faye (Phoebe Tonkin) and Melissa (Jessica Parker Kennedy) are looking for Faye's family crystal, they find Dawn's (Natasha Henstridge) journal from when she was a teenager. Reading it, they find out that there was something between Dawn and Blackwell.

Diana (Shelley Hennig) is trying to have a day away from the Circle and being with Grant (Tim Phillipps) but with the Circle searching for the crystals that's not easy. Melissa and Adam (Thomas Dekker) need her help to find Melissa's family crystal and she ends up leaving Grant alone all the time. Grant, realizing that she is hiding something, he demands to know what that is but Diana is not telling him.

Jake (Chris Zylka), Cassie (Britt Robertson) and Faye, team up later and go to Jake's grandfather, Royce (John De Lancie) house to find Jake's family crystal. When they get there, they discover different theories of events that happened sixteen years ago. Royce finds them looking in his stuff and when he realizes who they are he tells them many things about Blackwell.

Sixteen years ago, Blackwell wanted to make a dark Circle with members that have only black magic. To manage to do that, he had to have children with dark magic and that's what he was trying to do with the adult's Circle. He wanted to create kids. The three of them don't believe that this is true, but with what Faye read on her mother's journal and with Jake admitting that Isaac told him a while ago that Cassie was not the only Blackwell child in the Circle, Faye starts to believe that she is Blackwell's daughter.

Jake asks his grandfather for the crystal but Royce refuses to give it to him saying that he hid it well in a mine that no person with dark magic can get. Callum (Michael Graziadei), who was trying to reach Melissa and Faye knowing that they are witches, followed the three of them to Royce's house, he breaks in and steals the map of the mine where the crystal is hidden.

Cassie informs Adam about the mine and he and Melissa go there to find the crystal before Callum. They manage to find it but on their way out, Callum stops them and takes the crystal. Jake, Cassie and Faye get back from Royce's house and along with Diana get to the mine in time to stop Callum and take the crystal back. Jake marks Callum with a spell and tells him to leave Chance Harbor and never come back. If he does, they won't let him leave the next time.

In the meantime, Jane (Ashley Crow) promised Cassie that she'll give a second chance to Blackwell only for her, but what Jane really does is to team up with Charles (Gale Harold) so they can kill Blackwell. With a spell and a crystal, they manage to capture Blackwell, but when Charles is trying to kill him, he kills Jane because Blackwell exchange the vessel that was meant for him with Jane's blood. Blackwell leaves the house telling Charles that the only reason he is not killing him is because he still needs him for his plans.

The episode ends with Diana and Cassie talking and Diana telling Cassie that she needs a break from the Circle because it messes up her personal life. During their conversation it's revealed that Diana is the second Blackwell child in the Circle.

== Reception ==
=== Ratings ===
In its original American broadcast, "Crystal" was watched by 1.14 million; down 0.19 from the previous episode.

=== Reviews ===
"Crystal" received generally positive reviews.

Katherine Miller from The A.V. Club gave a B rate to the episode saying that finally we see who's the second Blackwell child. "Secret Circle returns and reveals it wasn’t just Amelia, Dawn, and Dr. Quinn, Medicine Woman that in the night dreamed of love so true with John Blackwell back in 1995—Diana’s mom was into it, too."

Carissa Pavlica from TV Fanatic rated the episode with 4.5/5 saying that the episode delivered another stunning blow by revealing who's the second Blackwell on the Circle. "I have to hand it to the show. I was so certain it wasn't Diana that as Melissa and Faye were ruled out during the episode, I was trying to determine which boy it might be, and if Nick might be coming back as Cassie's brother. Diana was the very last choice on my Blackwell family tree. But it worked, and it left me wanting more. I can't wait until next week. [...] What a night! A great new character in Grandpa Royce, the death of Jane and the reveal of Diana as Cassie's sister, not to mention the history since the Salem witch trials. WOW!"

The TV Chick review stated that this was a pretty successful week for The Secret Circle. "Crystals! Crystals! Crystals! This week the gang set out to steal the remaining crystals from the Elders. Someone died and another person found out her true identity. All in all it was a pretty successful week for The Secret Circle."

== Feature music ==
In the episode "Crystal" we can hear the songs:

- "The Sun" by The Naked And Famous
- "Gold" by Oberhofer
- "Like a Cigarette" by The Wildbirds
- "Strange Attractor" by Animal Kingdom
