= Curse (disambiguation) =

A curse is a spell or incantation intended to harm.

Curse(s) may also refer to:

== Film and television ==
- Curses! (film), a 1925 film directed by Fatty Arbuckle
- Curses! (TV series), a 2023 streaming television series
- "Curse" (The Secret Circle), a 2012 TV episode
- "Curses!" (Brandy & Mr. Whiskers), a 2006 TV episode
- "Curses" (Space Ghost Coast to Coast), a 1998 TV episode

== Music ==
- Curse (rapper) (born 1978), German rapper

=== Albums ===
- Curse (Alien Sex Fiend album), 1990
- Curse (The Legendary Pink Dots album), 1983
- Curses (Future of the Left album), 2007
- Curse (Unknown Mortal Orchestra EP), 2025
- Curses, by Vanna, 2007

=== Songs ===
- "Curse", by Cult of Luna from Eternal Kingdom, 2008
- "Curse", by Imagine Dragons from Imagine Dragons, 2009
- "Curse", by Jamie Drastik, featuring David Rush and Big Ali, 2010
- "Curse", by Architects from The Sky, the Earth & All Between, 2024
- "Curses", by Bullet for My Valentine from Bullet for My Valentine, 2004
- "A Curse", by Bury Tomorrow from The Union of Crowns, 2012

== Video games ==
- Curse (video game), a 1989 Sega Mega Drive console game
- Curse: The Eye of Isis, a 2003 video game
- Curses (video game), a 1993 interactive fiction computer game
- Curse LLC, an online video game portal and software company

== Other ==
- Curse (character), a fictional villain in the comic book Spawn
- Curses (anthology), a 1989 collection of fantasy and science fiction stories
- Curses (programming library), a programming library for Unix and Unix-like systems
- Profanity, a socially offensive use of language

== See also ==
- The Curse (disambiguation)
- Cursed (disambiguation)
