= The Wildbirds =

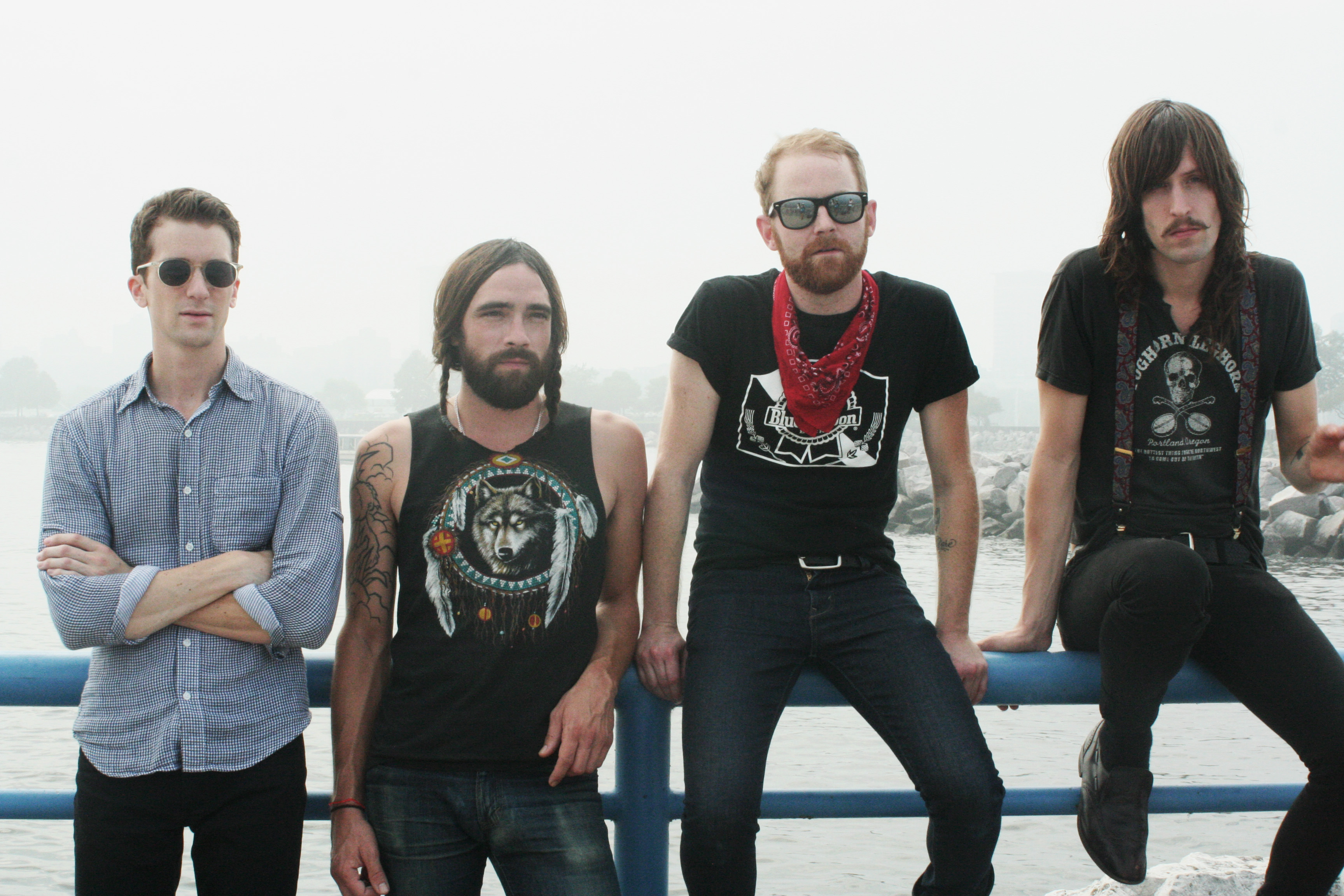
- Wildbirds in Milwaukee, 2010

Background information
- Origin: Milwaukee, Wisconsin (Appleton, Wisconsin)
- Genres: Rock, blues, pop
- Years active: 2007–present
- Members: Nicholas Stuart; Hugh Masterson; Quinn Scharber; Bradley Kruse
- Past members: Jon Jon Fries; Michael Ziemann; Matthew Reetz

The Wildbirds are a 5-piece rock band from Milwaukee, Wisconsin founded in 2007.

== History ==
The original line-up was formed by Nicholas Stuart, Matthew Reetz, Michael Ziemann, and Jon Jon Fries in 2006 in Appleton, Wisconsin. Each had previously been a part of the indie-rock band Number One Fan. Shortly after the recording of their debut album, Michael Ziemann left the band and was replaced by Hugh Masterson.

Their debut album Golden Daze, released on Universal Republic in 2007, was written in Matthew Reetz's hunting cabin in the Northwoods of Wisconsin. It was produced by Greg Fidelman (U2, Tom Petty, Johnny Cash) and engineered by Greg Gordon (Oasis, JET, Hot Hot Heat). The album was reviewed by David Fricke in the January 24, 2008 issue of Rolling Stone.

The Wildbirds spent only 6 months on tour before taking an undefined hiatus in early 2008. Stuart relocated to Baton Rouge, Louisiana, and then to Portland, Oregon. Fries moved to Woodstock, Illinois, where he pursued other musical interests. Reetz settled back in Appleton, Wisconsin, with his wife, Emily. Masterson spent time traveling between New York, Baton Rouge, Los Angeles, and Wisconsin.

In February 2010, singer Nicholas Stuart announced The Wildbirds were once again active with an entirely new line-up. Stuart had reconnected with Masterson and moved to Milwaukee to begin writing music. The result, a 6-song EP entitled "Sunshine Blues", was released on July 22, 2010.

On January 26, 2012, an official Facebook post from the band read, "We're writing, don't you worry!" However, the Wildbirds released no further music.

On October 11, 2019, the Wildbirds reunited at The Cooperage in Milwaukee for the Flannel Fest Pre-Party.

== Publicity ==
Their song "Suzanna" was featured on Little Steven's Underground Garage 'The Coolest Songs in the World Vol. 6'. The song "421 (Everybody Loves You)" was played on national television when Brett Favre threw his record-breaking 421st touchdown pass on October 1, 2007. The band cites this number was a mere coincidence. The band performed at the 2008 Winter X Games in Aspen, Colorado. The song "421 (Everybody Loves You)" was featured in ESPN's commercials leading up to the event, and "Hard on Me" was played during a feature on Levi LaVallee. Their song "Like a Cigarette" was featured on the show The Secret Circle, during the episode "Crystal".

== Discography ==
- Suzanna EP (2007)
- PRC (Pat's Record Co)
- Golden Daze (2007)
- Sunshine Blues EP (2010)

== Compilations ==
- Little Steven's Underground Garage 'The Coolest Songs in the World Vol. 6' (2008)
