= Curse (The Secret Circle) =

- The Secret Circle episode
- Cassie (Britt Robertson) & Adam (Thomas Dekker) getting ready to drink the elixir that breaks the curse
- Episode no.: Season 1 Episode 17
- Directed by: John Fawcett
- Written by: Don Whitehead; Holly Henderson
- Production code: 2J6267
- Original air date: March 22, 2012

Guest appearances
- Joe Lando; Alexia Fast; Hiro Kanagawa

Episode chronology
| ← Previous "Lucky" | Next → "Sacrifice" |

"Curse" is the 17th episode of the first season of the CW television series The Secret Circle, and the series' 17th episode overall. It was aired on March 22, 2012. The episode was written by Don Whitehead & Holly Henderson and it was directed by John Fawcett.

== Plot ==
Cassie and Adam after the night they spent together, they are informed by John Blackwell that their love has awakened the curse about the Blake and Conant families. The "written in the stars" might be destined but it is also cursed. Blackwell explains that Amelia was the one who told him about the curse and only Jane can tell them the details about it.

Cassie and Blackwell visit Jane at the clinic to ask about the curse. Jane says that if it is triggered, then one of the members of the Circle will die. Cassie and Adam inform the rest of the members about the situation while Jake starts to not feeling well. When they see that the curse is killing Jake, they are trying to find a way to stop it. Blackwell finds a recipe of an elixir that will break the curse and the three of them go with him to Calvin's store to find the ingredients.

Calvin is not there and his niece helps them to get what they want. A root of a plant is rare, though, and Cassie, Adam and Jake find it in the woods. Jake has hallucinations and Calvin is haunting him. In a moment of agony, Cassie and Adam realize that Jake killed Calvin. Back at the abandoned house, Blackwell makes the elixir, which comes with a cost. When they drink it, the curse will break but they will forget why they love each other. The elixir works on Adam but not on Cassie who still remains in love with him.

In the meantime, Charles and Dawn visit Jane to find out what Blackwell wanted from her. Dawn is trying to convince Charles to work with Blackwell so they can get their powers back. Charles says he will never be in the same team with Blackwell again and he visits Jane again, alone this time, casting a spell on her to make her help him destroy Blackwell.

Faye goes to Lee's place looking for him but she only finds Eva. Eva tells her that Lee has left town but she does not believe her. Faye convinces Diana and Melissa to help her find out what's wrong with Eva and Lee. When later Faye confronts Eva, she finds out that Eva has powers and realizes that the voodoo Lee did, gave her powers to Eva. Eva, learning that she is a witch, tells Faye that she killed Lee with magic and she asks her to bring him back. Faye is in shock and tries to leave but Eva doesn't leave her to go. Not having another choice, Faye pretends that she is trying to bring Lee back. Instead, she breaks the second totem and Eva loses her powers.

Dawn confronts Blackwell telling him that what Jane said to Cassie is not true, that there is no curse and that she also does not believe that he does not have any powers. Blackwell admits that he does have magic and that he faked the curse by killing the crows, making Jake sick and forcing Jane lie to Cassie. He does not have enough magic to protect the Circle though, and the reason he did all these was because of that. Amelia and Ethan's love was the reason the adults' Circle was destroyed and he will not let that happen again.

== Reception ==
=== Ratings ===
In its original American broadcast, "Curse" was watched by 1.74 million; up 0.12 from the previous episode.

=== Reviews ===
"Curse" received positive reviews.

Katherine Miller from The A.V. Club gave a B− rate to the episode saying that the show is a hang-out show. "The Secret Circle’s secret is that it’s really a hang-out show, in need a few of a few tweaks, trapped in a plot-chewing thriller’s body."

Carissa Pavlica from TV Fanatic rated the episode with 4.7/5 stating that there were many twists on the episode. "There were a lot of twists and turns in Curse and it left the future a blank slate. John? A liar. Lee? Dead. Eva? Powers gone. Adam and Cassie? Their love vanished. Let's analyze how it went down."

Sarah Maines from The TV Chick said that the episode left her looking forward for few things. "What is Blackwell up to?! Will Charles and Cassie’s grandma be able to take him down? Will Cassie be able to pull herself together or will we be seeing mopey Cassie? Will Dawn and Charles finally get their powers back and rise up over their weaker, romantically distracted children?!"

== Feature music ==
In the episode "Curse" we can hear the songs:

- "Moon in my mind" by Frankie Rose
- "Daydream" by Beach Fossils
- "Hit me Down Sonny" by The Ting Tings
- "Athens" by Mansions On The Moon
