= Number One Fan (band) =

American rock band

- Origin: Appleton, Wisconsin, United States
- Genres: Alternative rock
- Years active: 2000–2005
- Labels: Pat's Record Company
- Members: Nicholas Ziemann; Michael Ziemann; Matthew Reetz; Jonathan Fries

Number One Fan was a rock band based in Appleton, Wisconsin signed to the Pat's Record Company label.

== Biography ==
The band was formed in 2000 in Appleton, Wisconsin, while all of the members were still in high school. The original lineup of the band consisted of vocalist and guitarist Nicholas Ziemann, guitarist Matthew Reetz, drummer Jonathan Fries, and a bassist, who left a year later. He was replaced by Nicholas's brother, Michael Ziemann, who had no prior experience with a bass guitar. The band independently recorded and released their debut album, Compromises, in 2003. They got signed to Pat Magnarella's Universal Music Group-distributed Pat's Record Company in 2004, the label issuing a remastered version of the album. The album saw the band compared to Dashboard Confessional, Counting Crows, and The Cure. Kaj Roth of Melodic.net, wrote of Compromises: "there's depth in their music but without being too complex or dark......this quartet makes music that is quite simple but also intelligent at the same time", and the site made NOF band of the week.

In December 2005, the band renamed themselves The Wildbirds and refocused their musical style to a more garage rock sound. The Wildbirds went on a temporary hiatus from 2008 to 2009, but have since reformed with an entirely new line-up (except singer/songwriter Nicholas Ziemann) in 2010.

On June 2, 2007, Nicholas officially announced the breakup of the band via their Myspace. In October, the band announced that they would release their unreleased second album, which was recorded prior to forming The Wildbirds in 2005. A tour in support of it was announced in November. The album was released on December 7, 2007 on Monopar Records.

During its existence, they have played with many notable bands, including Green Day, The All-American Rejects, Something Corporate, Switchfoot, and The Juliana Theory. They were also part of the Vans Warped Tour in 2004. Their influences include The Beach Boys, The Beatles, U2 and Counting Crows, whose song, "Holiday In Spain" was covered by the band for Dead and Dreaming, a tribute compilation album.

== Discography ==
=== Albums ===
- Compromises (2003) reissued (2004, Pat's/Universal)
- Unreleased (2007)

== Members ==
- Nicholas Ziemann - vocals, guitar, piano
- Michael Ziemann - bass, vocals
- Matthew Reetz - guitar
- Jonathan Fries - drums, vocals, Percussion
