= The Curse (Dubus story) =

1988 short story by Andre Dubus

The Curse is a 1988 short story by Andre Dubus. It is realistic fiction and deals with the problem of standing by or helping out when chaos occurs.

== Plot ==
The Curse is about a fairly average man named Mitchell. He'd married a divorced woman and adopted her two teenagers. He is perfectly happy with life, but one day five stoned bikers enter his bar, and rape a young women who has entered too. He feels as though he should fight back against them, but instead does nothing except for calling the police. She is sent to the hospital. When he returns to work, the curse takes full effect, he sees everyone differently, and is greatly saddened by the events that have traumatized him. The titular "curse" causes Mitchell to lose his joy.

== Analysis ==
The point of view is third person limited objective: Dubus tells everything from a neutral point of view, he talks about what happens to Mitchell with no interjections. He intentionally withholds information for a dramatic effect. Since this type of narration feels disconnected, it fits in with the type of story, and the fact that it could happen to anyone.

At the very beginning of the story, the reader is treated with details about Mitchell, mostly physical. One is imbibed with the fact Mitchell is pretty normal: he is 49, he is fit and a normal height. He remains this way throughout the book, but Dubus says in the onset that he feels like an elderly man, with an "exhaustion that could not be overcome with sleep and rest". He seems to be a kind man, he loves his wife and children, he clearly cared about the victim in his bar. Dubus used both exposition and indirect characterization to create a likable and realistic character for The Curse.

The setting of The Curse is mundane: the first location is some bar near the boardwalk of a beach.

Dubus' writing style is actually very similar to Hemingway's style. He states facts, which in some ways break the classic rule of "show, don't tell". He lists all the facts about a location, yet he still uses his words to imply details about places or people. "Mitchell looked away, at the front door. He had put the chairs upside down on the table." Here, Dubus tells the reader what is going on, without obfuscating the meaning with needless adjectives or purple prose. This creates an easy read, one that is fit for a short story and will not confuse a reader.

The tone is grim. It is marred by gloom and sadness. Dubus, of course, needed to let the reader know the mental anguish Mitchell feels. To do this, he reiterates the fact that Mitchell feels older and the details of the rape that he witnessed. The tone fits for the story, as it is a gloomy, regretful reflection of past events. It would not have worked if Dubus described everything in a cheerful manner or with joy in his prose, it has to be grim. This helps play a role into the theme of guilt.

The overarching theme of the story is simply guilt. Mitchell feels guilty because he did not assist the girl until after she had been raped mercilessly. As a result, he can not view anything in the same light anymore, he sees everyone in his bar differently, and he gets the inkling that they do the same unto him. He still has flashbacks to that night weeks after the event, hallucinating that she and the bikers are still in his bar, remembering every puny detail.

The bar in which Mitchell worked is a prominent symbol. It is a location where innocence comes to die. People come into the bar, gobbling their meals and getting into fights. The victim of the story is a young girl who walked in, not looking for trouble, and was fairly well off. Although she had pure intentions, she ended up getting raped by men who had no respect for women.

Dubus portrays an "average Joe" struggling with guilt after a woman is raped right in front of him. Although he penned this story almost 30 years ago, it is hardly less poignant to this day.

== Reception ==
Madonne M. Miner, writing in Studies in Short Fiction reviewed the work and called it a tale dealing with "guilt, inaction, and manhood", greatly praising the work and the effort put into it.
