= Freshwater (film) =

- Theatrical release poster
- Directed by: Brandeis Berry
- Screenplay by: Brandeis Berry
- Story by: Brandeis Berry
- Produced by: Faisal Al-Saja; Thomas Beach; Omar Abunayyan; Christopher Biewer
- Starring: Zoë Bell; Joe Lando; Alison Haislip; Amy Paffrath
- Cinematography: Travis Hoffman
- Edited by: Karen Broderick
- Music by: Deanna Lasker
- Production company: Granfalloon Productions
- Distributed by: MultiVisionnaire
- Release date: February 26, 2016
- Running time: 83 minutes
- Country: United States
- Language: English

Freshwater is a 2016 American thriller film written and directed by Brandeis Berry, starring Zoë Bell, Joe Lando, Amy Paffrath, and Alison Haislip. Dread Central likened the film's premise to the 2011 horror film Shark Night.

== Plot ==
Set in Louisiana, the film centers around a group of young adults that are faced with a scary reality as they realize they are being hunted around their lake house by a giant alligator while a local reptile consultant teams up with the local law enforcement to find out what might be happening.

== Cast ==
- Zoë Bell as Brenda Gray
- Joe Lando as Sheriff Jones
- Amy Paffrath as Kim Whitley
- Alison Haislip as Claudia Mosley
- Tom O'Connell as Agent Sam Colton
- John Bobek as Matt Hanton
- Christopher Biewer as Deputy Clyde
- Derrick Redford as Jason Hightower
- Donnabella Mortel as Jamie Castell
- Michael St. Michaels as Bob
- Faisal Al-Saja as Travis Beecher
- Marti Hale as Mary
- John V. Ward as John Castleberry
- Kevin Wayne as Trooper Ford
- Brian Waters as Agent Ray

== Release ==
The film was released on DVD in the US on February 14, 2017. It was released in the UK on DVD on June 6, 2016.

== Novelization ==
A novelization of the film was released in July 2021 by novelist Julian Michael Carver. In 2022, the novelization was nominated for the Scribe Award by the International Association of Media Tie-In Writers for "Best Adapted Novel", alongside the novelizations of Alien 3 and Halloween Kills.
