= List of people known as the Accursed =

The Accursed is an epithet applied to:

== People ==
- John II of Salerno (died between 994 and 998), count of the palace of Salerno and acting regent for Prince Pandulf II
- Sviatopolk I of Kiev (c. 980–1019), Prince of Turov and Grand Prince of Kiev
- Toghrul of Ghazna (died 1053), Turkish slave general and usurper

== Fictional characters ==
- Malekith the Accursed, a villain in the Marvel Comics universe
- Uldor the Accursed, an Easterling who betrayed Maedhros in J. R. R. Tolkien's Middle-earth

== See also ==
- Conomor the Cursed, sixth century ruler of Brittany
- Alexander the Great, called "gojastak" (accursed) in Zoroastrian literature
