= Cursed (Righteous Vendetta album) =

Studio album by Righteous Vendetta
- Released: March 17, 2017
- Studio: Cuddledeath Studios, Los Angeles, CA
- Genre: Metalcore; hard rock; alternative metal
- Length: 45:50
- Label: Century Media
- Producer: Mitchell Marlow

Righteous Vendetta chronology
Defiance (2014)	Cursed (2017)

Singles from Cursed
- 1. "Weight of the World" Released: February 2, 2017; 2. "Cursed" Released: March 3, 2017; 3. "War Is Killing Us All" Released: June 2, 2017

Professional ratings
Review scores
Source	Rating
Cryptic Rock	4/5 stars
Distorted Sound	8/10
New Release Tuesday	Positive
Rock Revolt	4/5 stars

Cursed is the fourth studio album by American band Righteous Vendetta. The album was released on March 17, 2017 through Century Media Records.

== Track listing ==
No.	Title	Writer(s)	Length
1.	"War Is Killing Us All"	Ryan Hayes, Justin Olmstead, Zack Goggins, Mitchell Marlow	3:38
2.	"Cursed"	Hayes, Olmstead, Goggins, Marlow	3:05
3.	"Weight of the World"	Brandon Saller, Hayes, Olmstead, Marlow	3:18
4.	"Daemons"	Hayes, Olmstead, Goggins, Marlow	3:28
5.	"A Way Out"	Sahaj Ticotin, Hayes, Olmstead, Goggins, Marlow	3:16
6.	"Defiance"	Hayes, Olmstead	3:21
7.	"Psycho"	Hayes, Olmstead, Goggins, Marlow	3:24
8.	"Never Say Never"	Hayes, Olmstead, Goggins, Marlow	3:19
9.	"Doomed"	Hayes, Olmstead, Goggins, Marlow	4:06
10.	"Burn"	Brian Thomas, Shawn McGhee, Hayes, Olmstead, Marlow	3:43
11.	"Halfway"	Hayes, Olmstead, Goggins, Marlow	3:40
12.	"Become"	Hayes, Olmstead, Goggins, Marlow	3:45
13.	"Strangers"	Hayes, Olmstead, Marlow	3:48

== Personnel ==
Righteous Vendetta

- Ryan Hayes – vocals
- Justin Olmstead – lead guitar
- Justin Smith – rhythm guitar
- Riley Haynie – bass, samples
- Zack Goggins – drums, percussion

Additional

- Mitchell Marlow – producer, mixing
- Don Robertson – executive producer
- Howie Weinberg – mastering
- Bekki Friesen – assistant engineer
- Sara Kinne – product manager
- Mike Gitter – A&R
- Eve Saint Raven – artwork, layout
