= Robert Tine =

American author (1954–2019)

- Born: December 19, 1954; Providence, Rhode Island
- Died: February 22, 2019 (aged 64); Haverhill, Massachusetts
- Education: Columbia University
- Occupation: Novelist
- Writing career
- Pen name: Richard Harding
- Genres: Thriller, Science fiction
- Notable work: "The Outrider" series

Robert S. Tine (1954–2019) was an American author of thriller and science fiction novels. He is best known for his pulp post-apocalyptic series "The Outrider", which he published under the pseudonym Richard Harding. He also penned several movie novelizations based on a slew of 80s and 90s blockbusters including Footloose, Basic Instinct and Universal Soldier.

== Life ==
He was born Robert S. Tine in Providence, Rhode Island, and he grew up in Barrington, the Bahamas, Wales, South Africa, Swaziland, and Argentina. He was a graduate of Columbia University in New York. He also lived in Italy in the 1980s, where two of his novels were set: State of Grace (1980) and Black Market (1992).

In 2005 he moved from New York to Newburyport, Massachusetts, where he died in 2019.

== Work ==
Throughout his life Tine published six novels of mainstream fiction, the latter of which garnered good reviews—particularly Black Market, set during the liberation of Rome in 1944. Publishers Weekly, in its review of Black Market, called Tine "a genius at characterization."

However, Tine's larger output by far was in the field of novelizations from movies (mostly science fiction, action, and neo-noir, but also four tie-ins to the John Hughes' Beethoven franchise) and TV shows such as JAG and Touched by an Angel.

=== "The Outrider" ===
Tine is most remembered today for his hard-boiled "Outrider" series, comprising five mass-market survival fiction novels published by Pinnacle in 1984 and 1985 under the pseudonym Richard Harding (not to be confused with author and war reporter Richard Harding Davis, 1864–1916).

Heavily inspired by George Miller's 1979 film Mad Max, "The Outrider" series is set in what is left of a dystopian United States following a nuclear apocalypse. The hero, the lonesome, rugged survivalist Bonner, is based in the ruins of Chicago, although his adventures take him through much of the ravaged country. He has been compared with other vigilante types such as those in Jerry Ahern's Survivalist and Defender series, James Axler's Deathlands and Outlanders series, and D.B. Drumm's Traveler. Instead of being on the search of loved ones, however, Bonner is "more like the stereotypical retired gunslinger who still finds himself pulled into one job or another." Each story is awash with pulpy clichés, machismo, and gory action scenes. Genre fans hold the series in high regard.

The fifth and last book in the series actually ends with the announcement of a sixth entry, titled Black Death. It was never published due to Pinnacle's bankruptcy in 1985.

"The Outrider" series was included as a feature presentation on the January 5th, 2018 episode of the Library at the End of the World podcast.

=== Partial bibliography ===
- State of Grace (Viking, 1980)
- Uneasy Lies the Head (Pinnacle, 1982)
- Broken Eagle (Pinnacle, 1985)
- Midnight City (New American Library, 1987)
- Black Market (St. Martin's, 1992)

==== "The Outrider" series ====
- The Outrider (Pinnacle, 1984)
- Fire and Ice (Pinnacle, 1984)
- Blood Highway (Pinnacle, 1984)
- Bay City Burnout (Pinnacle, 1984)
- Built to Kill (Pinnacle, 1985)

==== Movie tie-ins ====
- Footloose (1984)
- Beverly Hills Cop II (1987)
- Red Heat (1988)
- Tucker (1988)
- Rooftops (1989)
- Bill & Ted's Bogus Journey (1991)
- Basic Instinct (1992)
- The Bodyguard (1992)
- The Hand That Rocks the Cradle (1992)
- Universal Soldier (1992)
- Forever Young (1992)
- Beethoven (1992)
- The Last Action Hero (1993)
- Hard Target (1993)
- Demolition Man (1993)
- Drop Zone (1994)
- Outbreak (1995)
- Assassins (1995)
- Mulholland Falls (1996)
- Eraser (1996)
- Chain Reaction (1996)
- Beethoven's 2nd(1996)
- Beethoven's Puppies(1996)
- Beethoven's Puppies: Family Vacation (1996)
- Blood and Wine (1997)
- Warriors of Virtue (1997)
- Desperate Measures (1998)
- JAG (1998)
- My Dinner With Andrew (1998)
- Tough Love (1999)
- The Astronaut's Wife (1999)
- JAG: Clean Steel (2000)
