= Benedict Jacka =

British author (born 1980)

- Born: 25 September 1980 (age 45); London
- Occupation: Writer
- Writing career
- Genres: fantasy, urban fantasy
- Website: benedictjacka.co.uk

Benedict Jacka (born 25 September 1980) is a British author, best known for his Alex Verus series.

== Biography ==
Jacka was born in England and attended the City of London School. He later attended Cambridge University, where he graduated with a Bachelors in philosophy and met his editor Sophie Hicks from Ed Victor Ltd. His first novels were three children's fantasy novels that didn’t get published, followed by To Be A Ninja (later changed to Ninja: The Beginning), a children's non-fantasy novel, which was. In 2000 he began working on a fantasy setting with teenage elementals, for which he wrote four unpublished novels. In 2009, he decided to try again with an adult character and a more information-based ability. Three years later, in 2012, he published the first book of the Alex Verus series, two more followed the same year. Jacka married in 2015 to Rolari Kuti.

Critical reception for Jacka's work has been mostly positive. Of the Alex Verus series, SF Site has cited the series' characters and chapter cliffhangers as highlights. SF Crowsnest gave an overall positive review for Cursed, while stating it was "an enjoyable, if unchallenging, read".

== Bibliography ==
=== Alex Verus series ===
- Fated (2012)
- Cursed (2012)
- Taken (2012)
- Chosen (2013)
- Hidden (2014)
- Veiled (2015)
- Burned (2016)
- Bound (2017)
- Marked (2018)
- Fallen (2019)
- Forged (2020)
- Risen (2021)

In June 2021 Jacka released "Favours", a novella which takes place between books 6 and 7; in October 2022 he released "Gardens", a novella which takes place after book 12.

=== Inheritance of Magic series ===
- An Inheritance of Magic (2023)
- An Instruction in Shadow (2024)
- A Judgement of Powers (2025)

=== Ninja series ===
- Ninja: The Beginning (2005)
- Ninja: The Battle (2007)
