= Star Trek (novel) =

2009 novel by Alan Dean Foster

- Author: Alan Dean Foster
- Language: English
- Genre: Science fiction novel
- Publisher: Simon & Schuster
- Publication date: May 2009
- Publication place: United States
- Media type: Print (Paperback)
- Pages: 288 pp
- ISBN: 978-1-4391-5886-9
- OCLC: 317253182

The novelization of the film Star Trek was written in 2009 by Alan Dean Foster, who had also written novelizations of Star Trek: The Animated Series.

Paramount moved the film's release from December 2008 to May 2009, as the studio felt more people would see the film during summer than winter. The film was practically finished by the end of 2008, and this allowed Foster to watch the whole film before writing the novelization, although the novel contains scenes absent from the film's final edit.
