= Joe Lando =

American actor

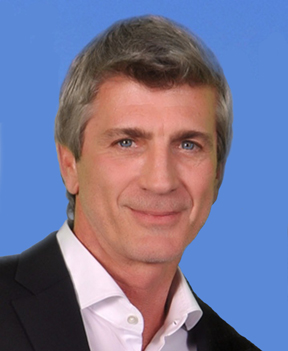
- Lando in February 2017
- Born: Joseph John Lando; Prairie View, Illinois, U.S.
- Occupation: Actor
- Years active: 1984–present
- Spouse: Kirsten Barlow (m. 1997)
- Children: 4

Joseph John Lando is an American actor, known for playing Jake Harrison on daytime's One Life to Live (1990–1992) and Byron Sully on the television series Dr. Quinn, Medicine Woman (1993–1998).

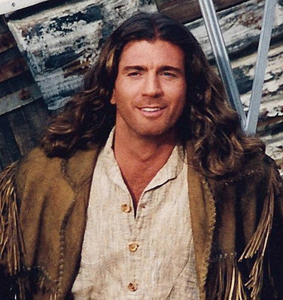
Lando as Sully on the set of Dr. Quinn, Medicine Woman in 1998

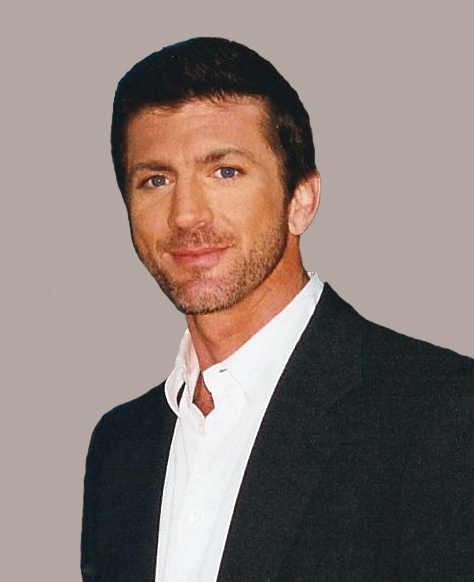
Lando at a meeting with fans in 2000

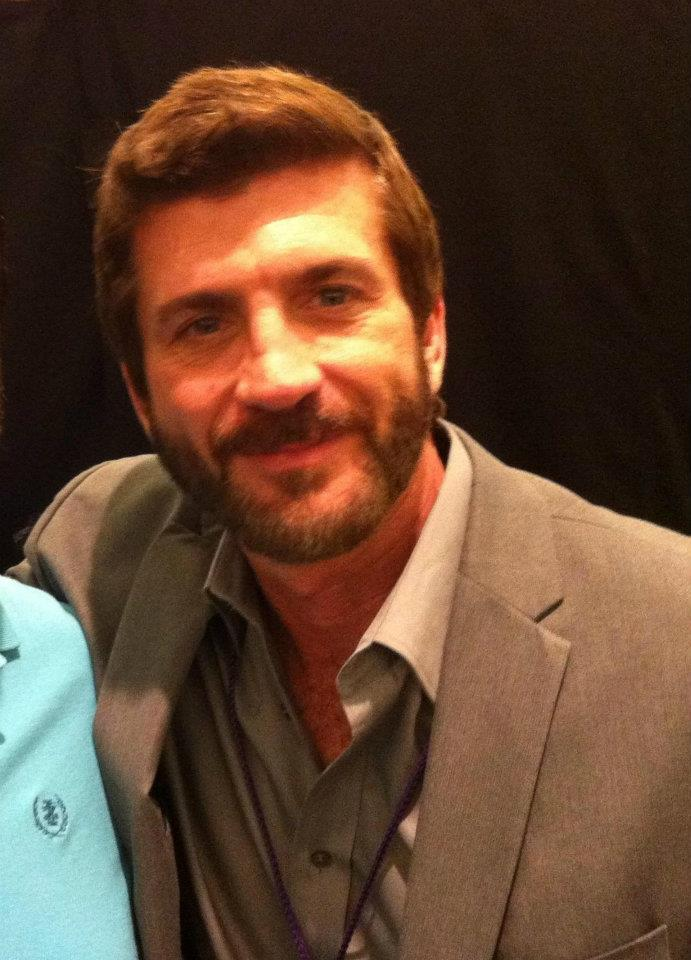
Lando in April 2012

== Life and career ==
Lando grew up in Prairie View, Lake County, Illinois, and attended Stevenson High School in Lincolnshire, Illinois.

His first acting role was as a patrolman in Star Trek IV: The Voyage Home. He received attention for his role as Jake Harrison in the soap opera One Life to Live, and went on to co-star in the popular drama Dr. Quinn, Medicine Woman as Michaela Quinn's love interest, Byron Sully. He also appeared in the television series Guiding Light and starred in Higher Ground, for which he also served as executive producer. He had a small part in the series Summerland, and appeared in eight episodes of the TV series The Secret Circle as John Blackwell, the father of the main character. In 2014 he joined several Dr. Quinn castmates as they all reprised their roles for the "Funny or Die" parody Dr. Quinn, Morphine Woman.

He has appeared in various feature films, including Seeds of Doubt (1996) and No Code of Conduct (1998). He reunited with Dr. Quinn costar, Jane Seymour, in 2011 for Hallmark Channel's Perfectly Prudence, in 2022 for Lifetime's A Christmas Spark, and again in 2025 for Harry Wild.

He was named one of People magazine's 50 Most Beautiful People in the World for 1993.

Lando lost his Pacific Palisades house of 22 years in the 2025 Palisades fire. Afterwards he and his family temporarily moved in with Jane Seymour.

== Filmography ==
Year	Film / TV Show	Role	Notes
1985	Star Search	Contestant	
1986	Star Trek IV: The Voyage Home	Shore Patrolman	Film debut
1989	Nightingales	Repairman	S1 E4
1990	Beauty and the Beast	One of Gabriel's Thugs	S3 E5 "Beggar's Comet"
1990	I Love You to Death	Pizza Guy	Also technical advisor in the pizza kitchen
1990	One Life to Live	Jake Harrison	Part of the iconic couple "Jake & Megan"
1993	Guiding Light	MacAuley West	
1993-1998	Dr. Quinn, Medicine Woman	Byron Sully	Co-starred with Jane Seymour in 143 episodes
1994	Shadows of Desire	Sonny Snow	
1995	The Nanny	Himself, and in character as Byron Sully	S3 E11 "The Unkindest Cut"
1996	Seeds of Doubt	Raymond Crawford	
1996	The John Larroquette Show	Todd	S3 E15 "The Train Wreck"
1996	Alien Nation: The Enemy Within	Rick Shaw	
1997	California	Byron Sully	Spinoff of Dr. Quinn, Medicine Woman
1997	Any Place But Home	Lucas Dempsey	
1998	Tracey Takes On...	Himself	S3 E2 “Hollywood”
1998	Blindness	Patrick	
1998	JAG	Christopher Ragle	2 Episodes: S4 E8 "Mr. Rabb Goes to Washington" and S4 E9 "People v. Mac"
1998	No Code of Conduct	Willdog	
1999	Dr. Quinn, Medicine Woman: The Movie	Byron Sully	AKA "Revolutions," this film continues the story of "Dr. Quinn, Medicine Woman."
2000	The Adventures of Cinderella's Daughter	King Gregory	
2000	Higher Ground	Peter Scarbrow	Starred in 22 episodes, also Executive Producer for the series.
2001	Dr. Quinn, Medicine Woman: The Heart Within	Byron Sully	This film continues the story of "Dr. Quinn, Medicine Woman."
2002	Counterstrike	Secret Service Agent Vince Kellogg	AKA "Attack of the Queen"
2003	Killer Flood: The Day the Dam Broke	David Arthur Powell	
2003	Devil Winds	Peter Jensen	
2004	Summerland	Tyler 'Driftwood Guy' James Obergon	S1 E11 "Life in the Fishbowl"
2004	Combustion	Scott Daniels	
2005	1-800-Missing	SiAC Tobias Burke	E2 S15 "John Doe"
2005	Bloodsuckers	Churchill	AKA "Vampire Wars"
2005	Wildfire	Pete Ritter	7 episodes, 2005–2006
2006	Engaged to Kill	Robert Lord	Lifetime Movie
2006	A.I. Assault	Major Richard Tunney	AKA "Shockwave"
2010	Meteor Apocalypse	David DeMatti	
2010	NCIS	Lieutenant Commander Rob Clarke	S7 E12 "Flesh and Blood"
2010	Spotlight	Cal Johnson	Short film
2011	Perfectly Prudence	Jack Jameson	Hallmark Movie that reunited him with Dr. Quinn co-star, Jane Seymour
2012	The Secret Circle	John Blackwell	The CW series, 8 episodes
2012	Layover/Abducted	Elliot	Lifetime Movie as Layover; on DVD as Abducted
2014	Hit the Floor	Detective Ray Harris	2 Episodes: S2 E11 "Sudden Death" and S2 E12 "Winner Takes All"
2014	Born Wild	Will Brooks	Formerly known as "Thriftstore Cowboy". Reunited him with Dr. Quinn castmate, William Shockley.
2014	Dr. Quinn, Morphine Woman	Byron Sully	Short parody produced by "Funny or Die" that reunited him with Jane Seymour & several Dr. Quinn castmates.
2015	Earthfall	Steven Lannon	
2016	Casa Vita	Cliff Lindstrom	TV movie for PixL; airs on other channels as "Love Throws a Curve"
2016	Freshwater	Sheriff Jones	
2016	Spotlight—Pt. 2	Cal Johnson	Short film with Dr. Quinn castmate Jonelle Allen.
2017	Sniper: Ultimate Kill	Special Agent John Samson	
2018	The Bold and the Beautiful	Judge Craig McMullen	
2019	The Untold Story	Danny	Formerly After Ours
2020	Hammurabi	Jake	Short Film
2020	Friendsgiving	Handsome Man	Appeared with Dr. Quinn costar Jane Seymour. Premiered in theaters Oct. 23, 2020.
2020	A Very Charming Christmas Town	Darren	Premiered on Lifetime on Nov. 8, 2020.
2022	Paloma's Flight	Sam Moses	Series TV pilot
2022	A Christmas Spark	Hank Maris	Appeared with Dr. Quinn costar Jane Seymour. Premiered on Lifetime on Nov. 27, 2022.
2022	The Bay	Lee Nelson	Season 7, Episodes 3 & 4, Aired in December 2022
2023	The Bold and the Beautiful	Judge Craig McMullen	Aired Jan. 9-11, 2023
2023	Night Train	Chuck McCord	Theatrical Release on Jan. 13, 2023.
2026	Harry Wild	Pierce Kennedy	Aired June. 22 to July 27, 2026
2026	The Legend of Van Dorn	Dr. George B. Peters	Internet Release on August 21, 2026.
2026	Without Prejudice	Sam Brownstone	Upcoming
2026	The Quiet Cost	Dan	Upcoming
