= Pilot (disambiguation) =

A pilot is a person who flies or navigates an aircraft.

Pilot or The Pilot may also refer to:

== Common meanings ==
- Maritime pilot, a person who guides ships through hazardous waters
- Television pilot, a television episode used to sell a series to a television network
- Pilot experiment, a small-scale preliminary study conducted prior to a full-scale research project

== Arts, entertainment and media ==
=== Fictional characters ===
- Pilot (Farscape), a member of a race known as Pilots
- Jennifer "Pilot" Chase, a character in the Canadian-American science fiction-action television series Captain Power and the Soldiers of the Future

=== Film and television ===
- Pilot (2024 film), a 2024 South Korean film
- Pilots (film), a 2000 Malayalam film
- The Pilot (film), a 1980 film
- "The Pilot" (Doctor Who), the first episode of the 10th series
  - The Pilot episode (Doctor Who), the first episode of the British science-fiction television series
- "The Pilot" (Seinfeld), the finale of the 4th season
- The Pilot. A Battle for Survival, a 2021 Russian film
- Television pilot, a trial episode of a show

==== Notable television pilots named "pilot" ====
- "Pilot" (30 Rock)
- "Pilot" (The 4400)
- "Pilot" (Abbott Elementary)
- "Pilot" (About a Boy)
- "Pilot" (Agents of S.H.I.E.L.D.)
- "Pilot" (American Dad!)
- "Pilot" (American Horror Story)
- "Pilot" (The Americans)
- "Pilot" (Arrested Development)
- "Pilot" (Arrow)
- Pilot" (Awake)
- "Pilot" (Back to You)
- "Pilot" (Being Human)
- "Pilot" (Better Off Ted)
- "Pilot" (The Big Bang Theory)
- "Pilot" (Big Love)
- "Pilot" (The Blacklist)
- "Pilot" (Body of Proof)
- "Pilot" (Bones)
- "Pilot" (Boy Meets World)
- "Pilot" (Breaking Bad)
- "Pilot" (Brooklyn Nine-Nine)
- "Pilot" (Burn Notice)
- "Pilot" (The Cleveland Show)
- "Pilot" (Cold Feet)
- "Pilot" (Community)
- "Pilot" (Cougar Town)
- "Pilot" (Gossip Girl)
- "Pilot" (Gotham)
- "Pilot" (Grimm)
- "Pilot" (Hawaii Five-0), 2010 series
- "Pilot" (Hell on Wheels)
- "Pilot" (Helluva Boss)
- "Pilot" (Homeland)
- "Pilot" (Hot Streets)
- "Pilot" (House)
- "Pilot" (How I Met Your Mother)
- "The Pilot" (It: Welcome to Derry)
- "Pilot" (Jericho)
- "Pilot" (The Killing)
- "Pilot" (King of the Hill)
- "Pilot" (Lanterns)
- "Pilot" (The Leftovers)
- "Pilot" (Legends of Tomorrow)
- "Pilot" (Life on a Stick)
- "Pilot" (Lost)
- "Pilot" (Louie)
- "Pilot" (M*A*S*H)
- "Pilot" (Malcolm in the Middle)
- "Pilot" (Manifest)
- "Pilot" (Masters of Sex)
- "Pilot" (Millennium)
- "Pilot" (Missing)
- "Pilot" (Person of Interest)
- "Pilot" (The Playboy Club)
- "Pilot" (Pose)
- "Pilot" (Preacher)
- "Pilot" (Pretty Little Liars)
- "Pilot" (Prison Break)
- "Pilot" (Psych)
- "Pie-lette" (Pushing Daisies)
- "Pilot" (Raising Hope)
- "Pilot" (Revenge)
- "Pilot" (Rick and Morty)
- "Pilot" (Ringer)
- "Pilot" (The Rookie)
- "Pilot" (Saving Hope)
- "Pilot" (Scream)
- "Pilot" (Scream Queens)
- "Pilot" (The Secret Circle)
- "Pilot" (Shameless)
- "Pilot" (The Shield)
- "Pilot" (Sit Down, Shut Up)
- "Pilot" (Six Feet Under)
- "Pilot" (Smallville)
- "Pilot" (Smash)
- "Pilot" (Sports Night)
- "Pilot" (Studio 60 on the Sunset Strip)
- "Pilot" (Suits)
- "Pilot" (Supergirl)
- "Pilot" (Supernatural)
- "Pilot" (Ted Lasso)
- "Pilot" (Terminator: The Sarah Connor Chronicles)
- "Pilot" (Terriers)
- "Pilot" (Touch)
- "Pilot" (Twin Peaks)
- "The Pilot" (Two Guys and a Girl)
- "Pilot" (Ugly Betty)
- "Pilot" (Under the Dome)
- "Pilot" (Up All Night)
- "Pilot" (V)
- "Pilot" (The Vampire Diaries)
- "Pilot" (Veronica Mars)
- "Pilot" (Vinyl)
- "Pilot" (The West Wing)
- "Pilot" (What We Do in the Shadows)
- "Pilot" (White Collar)
- "Pilot" (Will & Grace)
- "Pilot" (Without a Trace)
- "Pilot" (The X-Files)
- "Pilot" (Young Sheldon)

=== Literature ===
- The Pilot: A Tale of the Sea, an 1824 novel by James Fenimore Cooper
- "Pilot" (short story), a 1993 short story by Stephen Baxter
- The Pilot, a 1976 novel by Robert P. Davis

=== Publications ===
- Pilot (British magazine), a general aviation magazine
- The Pilot (Massachusetts newspaper), the official newspaper of the Roman Catholic Archdiocese of Boston, U.S.
- The Pilot (North Carolina newspaper), a semiweekly newspaper
- The Pilot News, a newspaper serving Plymouth, Indiana, U.S.
- The Virginian-Pilot, the daily newspaper of Norfolk, Virginia, U.S.
- The Pilot (Dublin newspaper), published 1830s–1840s by Eaton Stannard Barrett's brother Richard

=== Music ===
==== Bands ====
- Pilot (Scottish band), a Scottish rock group
- Pilot (Russian band), a Russian rock band

==== EPs ====
- Pilot (Mallory Knox EP), 2011
- Pilot (Reuben EP), 2001
- Pilot, a 2014 EP by Amber Run

==== Songs ====
- "Pilot" (song), by 50 Cent, 2014
- "Pilots" (song), a 2001 song by Goldfrapp
- "The Pilot" (song), by Double Experience, 2017
- "Pilot", a song by Tyler, the Creator featuring Syd from the 2015 album Cherry Bomb
- "Pilot", a song by Aldous Harding from the 2019 album Designer
- "Pilot", a song by Blue Cheer from the 1970 album The Original Human Being
- "Pilot", a song by the Notwist from the 2002 album Neon Golden
- "Pilot", a song by Ravyn Lenae from the 2024 album Bird's Eye
- "The Pilot", a song by England Dan & John Ford Coley from the 1976 album I Hear Music
- "The Pilot", a song by Tim Hicks from the 2026 album Going Somewhere

== Businesses ==
- Pilot (pen company), a Japanese pen manufacturer
- Pilot (studio), a Russian animation studio
- Pilot Flying J, a North American chain of truck stops
- Pilot Company, an American petroleum company
- Pilot Software, an American business intelligence vendor

== People ==
- Pilot (surname), including a list of people with the name
- Pilot Baba, nickname of Kapil Singh (1938–2024), Indian spiritual guru and former fighter pilot

== Places ==
- Pilot, Davidson County, North Carolina, U.S.
- Pilot, Franklin County, North Carolina, U.S.
- Pilot, Virginia, U.S.
- Pilot (župa), a county of Serbia in the Middle Ages
- Pilot Glacier, Victoria Land, Antarctica
- Pilot Island, in Lake Michigan, Wisconsin, U.S.
- Pilot Mountain (disambiguation)
- Pilot Township (disambiguation)

== Science and technology ==
- PILOT, a high-level programming language developed in the 1960s
- Pilot (operating system), designed by Xerox PARC in the 1970s
- PalmPilot, a personal digital assistant produced by Palm, Inc.

== Sports ==
- Portland Pilots, the nickname for athletics at the University of Portland, U.S.
- Seattle Pilots, a 1969 American baseball team that became the Milwaukee Brewers

== Transportation ==
=== Automobiles ===
- Ford Pilot, a 1947–1951 American-British mid-size car
- Honda Pilot, a 2003–present Japanese-American mid-size SUV
- LDV Pilot, a 1997–2006 British panel van
- MG Pilot, a 2020–present British-Chinese compact SUV
- Rover Pilot, a British car produced 1932–33

==== Automotive marques ====
- Pilot Motor Car Company, early 1900s American automobiles with the Pilot marque
- Pilot Cars Limited, early 1900s British automobiles with the Pilot marque
- Pilotmotorenwerke Bannewitz, early 1920s German automobiles with the Pilot marque

=== Ships and boats ===
- Pilot (1813 ship), a convict transport to Australia
- Pilot (1914 boat), a pilot boat and museum ship in San Diego, California, U.S.
- Pilot (1924 boat), a pilot boat in Boston
- Pilot (icebreaker), a Russian icebreaker ship, converted in 1864

=== Trains ===
- Pilot (locomotive attachment), or cowcatcher, a device mounted at the front of a locomotive to deflect obstacles
- Pilot locomotive for double heading, an additional engine for additional traction, motive power, etc
- Station pilot, a shunting engine based at a major passenger station

== Other uses ==
- HMS Pilot, several Royal Navy ships
- PILOT (finance), in public finance, a payment in lieu of taxes

== See also ==
- Piloting or pilotage, the act of navigating by visual landmarks over water or in the air
- Pilot fish (Naucrates ductor), a small fish
- Pilot job, a type of multilevel scheduling
- Pilot light, a flame kept continually burning and used to light burners on household appliances
- Pilot plant, a pre-commercial production system used to evaluate new technologies and designs
- Pilot signal, or pilot tone, in telecommunications
- Pilot whale, a whale-like dolphin
- Pilotman, a railway worker who ensures that only one train enters a single track rail segment at a time
- La Piloto, a 2017-2018 Spanish-language crime drama television series
- Pilate (disambiguation)
