= List of people from Reading, Pennsylvania =

This is a list of people who were born in, lived in, or are closely associated with the city of Reading, Pennsylvania.

== Athletics ==
- Gus Alberts (1861–1912), Major League Baseball player
- Elvin Ayala (b. 1981), professional boxer, World Boxing Council and U.S. National Boxing Council middleweight champion
- Allison Baver (b. 1980), professional speed skater
- George Bradley (1852–1931), Major League Baseball player
- Kenny Brightbill (b. 1948), race car driver
- James Bryant (b. 1985), professional football player
- Austin DeSanto (b. 1998), wrestler
- Carl Furillo (1922–1989), Major League Baseball outfielder
- Corey Hertzog (b. 1990), professional soccer player
- Alice Hoover (1928–2014), All-American Girls Professional Baseball League player
- Travis Kauffman (b. 1985), WBF Inter-Continental heavyweight boxing champion and ranked contender
- Betsy King (b.1955), golfer, winner of 34 LPGA Tour events and member of the World Golf Hall of Fame
- Whitey Kurowski (1918–1999), All-Star infielder for the St. Louis Cardinals
- Henry Larkin (1860–1942), Major League Baseball player
- Julian Letterlough (1969–2005), light heavyweight boxing champion
- Steve Little (1965–2000), WBA world middleweight boxing champion
- Donyell Marshall (b. 1973), basketball player, Connecticut and NBA power forward
- Julio Cesar Matthews (b. 1970), Golden Gloves champion and unbeaten professional cruiserweight boxer
- Lenny Moore (b. 1933), NFL running back and Pro Football Hall of Famer
- Kevin Ross (b. 1980), former Bellator Kickboxing featherweight champion
- Denise Rutkowski (b. 1962), professional female bodybuilder
- Melanie Skillman (b. 1954), Olympic archer
- Samuel Van Leer (1747–1825), ironmaster and captain in the American Revolutionary War
- Charlie Wagner (1912–2006), baseball player for Boston Red Sox
- Lonnie Walker IV (b. 1998), professional basketball player for Maccabi Tel Aviv, previously the Brooklyn Nets

== Arts & entertainment ==
- Coit Albertson (1880–1953), silent film actor
- Peter Brocco (1903–1992), actor
- Harry Buckwalter (1867–1930), photographer, journalist, film director and producer
- Dorothy Christy (1906–1977), actress
- Jack Coggins (1911–2006), artist and author
- Kayla Collins (b. 1987), model and Playboy Playmate (August 2008)
- Forrest Compton (1925–2020), actor
- Michael Constantine (1927–2021), actor
- Tullio DeSantis (b. 1948), artist, writer, professor
- Lisa Eichhorn (b. 1952), actress, writer, producer
- Meg Foster (b. 1948), actress
- Harry Whittier Frees (1879–1953), photographer
- Megan Gallagher (b. 1960), actress
- Frank Hovington (1919–1982), blues musician
- Mildred Jordan (1901–1982), novelist
- Chip Kidd (b. 1964), graphic designer and author
- A.S. King (b. 1970), author, winner of the LA Times Book Prize, Printz Award honoree
- Richie Kotzen (b. 1970), rock guitarist
- Rick Krebs (b. 1949), game designer
- Draya Michele (b. 1985), American social media personality, fashion designer, socialite, actress and model
- James Phyrillas (b. 1998), content creator on Schaffrillas Productions YouTube channel
- Mike Pilot (b. 1975), podcaster
- Mary Hiester Reid (1854-1921), Canadian painter and teacher
- David Robidoux, composer
- John Philip Sousa (1854–1932), iconic composer, died in Reading
- Ray Dennis Steckler (1938-2009), film director
- Jim Steranko (b. 1938), Silver Age comic book artist, magazine publisher and escape artist
- Wallace Stevens (1879–1955), poet
- Taylor Swift (b. 1989), singer-songwriter
- Chuck Thompson (1921–2005), sportscaster
- John Updike (1932–2009), Pulitzer Prize-winning novelist, poet, essayist
- Byron Vazakas (1905–1987), poet
- Angela Washko (b. 1986), artist
- Delores Wells (1937–2016), actress
- Richard "Dick" Wheeler (1922–2008), author and historian
- Thomas C. Zimmerman (1838–1914), writer, translator of English language classics to Pennsylvania German dialect

== Business ==
- Albert Boscov (1929–2017), chairman of Boscov's department store
- Mervin Heller Jr., past president of the United States Tennis Association
- Chad Hurley (b. 1977), co-founder and former CEO of YouTube
- Stu Jackson (b. 1955), executive vice president of basketball operations for the NBA
- Frederick Lauer (1810–1883), brewer, president of the United States Brewers' Association
- Thomas Usher, CEO of U.S. Steel and chairman of the Board of Marathon Oil
- Isaac Van Leer (1772–1821), iron works entrepreneur and owner of several nearby historical homes

== Military, politics, & public service ==
- George Warren Alexander (1829–1903), US Army officer and founder of G.W. Alexander & Co., a hat factory
- John Barrasso (b. 1952), U.S. senator from Wyoming
- Fay Biles (b. 1927), professor emerita of Kent State University
- Daniel Boone (1734–1820), frontiersman and leader of early settlements of Kentucky
- Sylvanus C. Breyfogel (1851–1934), bishop of Evangelical Association
- James Henry Carpenter (1846–1898), Civil War sailor, officer, founder of Carpenter Technology Corporation
- John Fetterman (b. 1969), U.S. senator from Pennsylvania
- David McMurtrie Gregg (1833–1916), American Civil War general
- Keith Haring (1958–1990), artist, activist
- William Muhlenberg Hiester (1818–1878), political and military leader
- Ed Kemmer (1921–2004), combat pilot and actor
- James H. Maurer (1864–1944), labor leader, three-term Pennsylvania House of Representatives member, and two-time vice presidential nominee
- Morton L. Montgomery (1846–1933), Pennsylvania attorney and historian
- Stephen Mull, U.S. assistant secretary of state for Political Ministry Affairs, U.S. ambassador to Lithuania
- James Nagle (1822–1866), Civil War general
- Curtis R. Reitz (b. 1929), Algernon Sydney Biddle Professor of Law at the University of Pennsylvania Law School
- Matthias Richards (1758–1830), U.S. congressman
- William Sands (1835–1918), U.S. Medal of Honor winner (Civil War)
- William Strong, associate justice of the Supreme Court of the United States
- J. Henry Stump (1880–1949), socialist mayor of Reading 1927–1931, 1935–1939 and 1943–1947

== Other ==
- Spencer Fullerton Baird (1823–1887), naturalist, ornithologist, ichthyologist and herpetologist
- Ariel Castro, convicted rapist and kidnapper of three women in Cleveland
- Richard H. Ebright (b. 1956), molecular biologist
- Roy Frankhouser (1939–2009), Grand Dragon of the Ku Klux Klan
- Hildegard Peplau (1909–1999), nurse theorist
- Lori and George Schappell (b. 1961), conjoined twins
- William Wiswesser (1914–1989), chemist and pioneer in chemical informatics
