= Pilot, Part 1 =

Pilot Part 1, Pilot, Part 1 or Pilot: Part 1 is the name of various television episodes

== Television ==
- "Pilot, Part 1" (Legends of Tomorrow)
- "Pilot: Part 1" (Lost)
- "The Pilot, Part 1" (Seinfeld)

== See also ==
- Pilot (disambiguation)
- Pilot, Part 2 (disambiguation)
