= Pilot, Part 2 =

Pilot Part 2, Pilot, Part 2 or Pilot: Part 2 is the name of various television episodes

== Television ==
- "Pilot, Part 2" (Legends of Tomorrow)
- "Pilot: Part 2" (Lost)
- "The Pilot, Part 2" (Seinfeld)

== See also ==
- Pilot (disambiguation)
- Pilot, Part 1 (disambiguation)
