= Night aviation regulations in the United States =

Night aviation regulations in the United States are administered and enforced by the Federal Aviation Administration (FAA). The United States places no special restrictions on VFR flying at night.

== Definitions ==
Three different concepts of "night" are referred to in the Federal Aviation Regulations in the US. These include the periods from

1. sunset to sunrise - used for navigation lights,
2. the end of evening civil twilight to the beginning of morning civil twilight (this is the "standard definition of night", given in FAR Section 1.1) - used for logging night flight,
3. one hour after sunset to one hour before sunrise - used for night currency and carrying passengers.

These uses of night are listed in order of increasing restrictiveness. The end of evening civil twilight generally occurs less than one hour after sunset.

=== Pilot currency ===
Pilots are required to maintain night currency every 90 days to carry passengers at night. Specifically, 61.57(b) states that "...no person may act as pilot in command of an aircraft carrying passengers during the period beginning 1 hour after sunset and ending 1 hour before sunrise, unless within the preceding 90 days that person has made at least three takeoffs and three landings to a full stop during the period beginning 1 hour after sunset and ending 1 hour before sunrise, and—

1. That person acted as sole manipulator of the flight controls; and
2. The required takeoffs and landings were performed in an aircraft of the same category, class, and type (if a type rating is required)."

== Recency and equipment requirements ==
- To log night hours, one uses the standard definition of night, given in FAR Section 1.1.
- Takeoffs and landings required to fulfill the recency requirements of FAR 61.57 must be conducted between one hour after sunset, and one hour before sunrise.
- Restrictions on carrying passengers also refers to the period from one hour after sunset to one hour before sunrise.
- The "night" restriction on Special VFR clearances, namely that the pilot and aircraft are rated and equipped for IFR, applies from sunset to sunrise, see AIM 4-4-6(g).
- Position lights are required from sunset to sunrise (see FAR 91.209 and AIM 4–3–23).
- Additional equipment required for VFR flight during the standard definition of night is given in FAR 91.205c, and summarized by the FLAPS mnemonic:
  - Fuses
  - Landing light (if for hire)
  - Anti-collision lights (beacon, strobe)
  - Position lights
  - Source of electricity
