= List of Scream episodes =

2015 American slasher horror TV series episode list

Scream is an American anthology slasher television series developed by Jill Blotevogel, Dan Dworkin and Jay Beattie for MTV and Brett Matthews for VH1. It is based on the slasher film series of the same name created by Kevin Williamson and Wes Craven. The series premiered on June 30, 2015.

During the course of the series, 30 episodes of Scream aired over three seasons, concluding on July 10, 2019.

== Series overview ==
| Season | Episodes | Originally released | | |
| Season | Episodes | First released | Last released | Network |
|---|---|---|---|---|
| 1 | 10 | June 30, 2015 | September 1, 2015 | MTV |
| 2 | 14 | May 30, 2016 | October 18, 2016 | MTV |
| 3 | 6 | July 8, 2019 | July 10, 2019 | VH1 |

== Episodes ==
=== Season 1 (2015) ===
| No. overall | No. in season | Title | Directed by | Written by | Original release date | US viewers (millions) |
|---|---|---|---|---|---|---|
| 1 | 1 | "Pilot" | Jamie Travis | Story by : Kevin Williamson; Teleplay by : Jill Blotevogel, Dan Dworkin & Jay Beattie | June 30, 2015 | 1.03 |
When a cyber-bullying incident results in a popular high school student's murder, the violence stirs up memories of a twenty-one-year-old killing spree that has haunted some, intrigued others and maybe just inspired a new killer.
| 2 | 2 | "Hello, Emma" | Tim Hunter | Jill Blotevogel | July 7, 2015 | 0.81 |
Audrey's secret girlfriend, Rachel Murray, is murdered by the killer, who stages it as a suicide. Her death raises questions and causes yet another rift between Emma and Audrey. Meanwhile, Piper, a provocative podcaster comes to Lakewood to report on the town's murders, past and present. The title of this episode is a reference to Ghostface's frequent use of the line "Hello, Sidney" in the Scream films.
| 3 | 3 | "Wanna Play a Game?" | Tim Hunter | Jordan Rosenberg & Meredith Glynn | July 14, 2015 | 0.87 |
Emma learns quickly that her mother has been keeping even more secrets from her; the killer continues to harass Emma and challenges her to a dangerous game. Jake and Will's cyber connection to Nina's death put their futures in jeopardy. The killer claims another victim close to Emma.
| 4 | 4 | "Aftermath" | Brian Dannelly | Erin Maher & Kay Reindl | July 21, 2015 | 0.80 |
The town is shaken by Riley's murder. Brooke struggles with guilt with leaving her at the station alone as a result. Tyler is proclaimed dead after his body is discovered in the debris of the car crash, but there's an important part of his body missing; Meanwhile, Will is admitted to Duke but is forced to return to his old ways in order to pay for tuition. Noah and Audrey discover Nina's missing laptop, but they come across a Salacious clip involving Emma.
| 5 | 5 | "Exposed" | Brian Dannelly | David Coggeshall | July 28, 2015 | 0.75 |
When Emma and Will's scandalous video is leaked, she learns a heartbreaking secret about freshman year. A memorial takes place for all of the victims of the killer. Sheriff Hudson is replaced temporarily by Detective Lorraine Brock who is assigned on for the murders. Will and Jake have an argument about what they want to do with the money.
| 6 | 6 | "Betrayed" | Julius Ramsay | Jaime Paglia | August 4, 2015 | 0.68 |
When Audrey's DNA is found on the inside of the killer's mask, she becomes the main suspect when Rachel's death becomes an investigation. Meanwhile, Jake's betrayal causes Will to turn to Piper by promising her a story of a lifetime. Brooke and Jake work together to keep a watch on her father after realizing that her mother is not in India like she was told. While doing so, they stumble across an incriminating security footage involving her dad that was made one month before the killings.
| 7 | 7 | "In the Trenches" | Leigh Janiak | Jordan Rosenberg & Meredith Glynn | August 11, 2015 | 0.64 |
While recovering, Piper informs the others of what happened the night before, which leads Emma, Jake, Brooke, and Noah to an abandoned bowling alley outside of town, where they play a dangerous game of hide and seek while urgently searching for Will. While there, Emma discovers another secret about her mother's past.
| 8 | 8 | "Ghosts" | Rodman Flender | Erin Maher & Kay Reindl | August 18, 2015 | 0.65 |
Two weeks after witnessing Will's horrifying murder, Emma goes back to school and her job, but has a hard time readjusting as everyone is on edge and her guilt starts to get the best of her. She also learns the true reason why her mother fled Lakewood after the killings and believes the reason is the motive for the new killings. Brooke finally learns about her family's dark secret. Audrey and Noah uncover a terrible background involving their English teacher, Seth Branson or who he used to be.
| 9 | 9 | "The Dance" | Ti West | Jill Blotevogel | August 25, 2015 | 0.55 |
A mysterious intruder broke into the Lakewood County Courthouse a year before the recent killings. In the present, despite the fact that Seth is in jail, Emma believes that the true killer is still out there and also has determined to find out more at the big Lakewood Halloween Dance. Since her mother is in rehab and her father is in jail, Brooke is forced to stay with Jake. However, while there she is almost caught up in Jake's cyberstalking.
| 10 | 10 | "Revelations" | Jamie Travis | Jaime Paglia | September 1, 2015 | 0.76 |
Branson escapes from prison, and the hunt for Sheriff Hudson begins. Emma and Noah work together to find the killer and identify them once and for all. It culminates in a final showdown, showing the person she least suspected to be behind all of her recent loss and mayhem. This episode was dedicated to Wes Craven (director of the Scream films), who died from brain cancer on August 30, 2015.

=== Season 2 (2016) ===
| No. overall | No. in season | Title | Directed by | Written by | Original release date | US viewers (millions) |
|---|---|---|---|---|---|---|
| 11 | 1 | "I Know What You Did Last Summer" | Brian Dannelly | Michael Gans & Richard Register | May 30, 2016 | 0.40 |
Nearly 4 months has passed since the events of Halloween night, Emma returns to Lakewood after three months away at a treatment facility for her PTSD. Audrey is harassed by someone who is aware of her connections with Piper. Jake and Brooke break up, but he ends up going missing the next day. Noah begins a somewhat unhealthy obsession with the previous murders and theorizes that Piper had an accomplice, which drives feelings of unease with Audrey. Emma has a dream about a barn and sees that exact barn on Noah's murder board and tried to find the reason behind it. The title of this episode is a homage to the 1997 slasher film I Know What You Did Last Summer. Bex Taylor-Klaus's opening sequence of the episode is a homage to the Jada Pinkett Smith and Omar Epps's opening sequence in Scream 2.
| 12 | 2 | "Psycho" | Scott Speer | Meredith Glynn | June 6, 2016 | 0.50 |
Tina, Kieran's alcoholic aunt, comes to Lakewood and delivers a bombshell. Realizing she has a lot to catch up on in the middle of the winter semester, Emma strikes up a friendship with Ms. Lang, the guidance counselor, Zoey, a returning student who came back to Lakewood after being gone during the events of the first spree and Eli, a new student who has a surprising connection to Kieran. A clue Noah discovers directs him to the motel where Eddie the front desk clerk claims to have seen Piper's sidekick. Audrey is directed to an abandoned warehouse, where she makes a grisly discovery. The title of this episode is a homage to the 1960 psychological horror film Psycho.
| 13 | 3 | "Vacancy" | Jamie Travis | Steve Yockey | June 13, 2016 | 0.35 |
Audrey is blackmailed by the killer after finding Jake's body. Kevin, Emma's father, confesses that he was in contact with Riley Mara, which scares Emma since Riley was killed 5 months ago by Piper. The title of this episode is a homage to the 2007 horror film Vacancy.
| 14 | 4 | "Happy Birthday to Me" | Daniel Stamm | Brian Sieve | June 20, 2016 | 0.27 |
Still being harassed by calls, Audrey suspects Stavro is behind it. Kieran's 17th birthday is ruined by a bottle of tequila laced with heavy narcotic, bringing the gang on an unexpected voyage into their subconscious. When the Lady of the Lake finalists are announced, it ends in a bloody surprise. The title of this episode is a homage to the 1981 psychological slasher film, Happy Birthday to Me.
| 15 | 5 | "Dawn of the Dead" | Oz Scott | Heath Corson | June 28, 2016 | 0.45 |
Another murder has placed GW High on lockdown. Packed in the library, tensions and fear between the other students and the now Lakewood five reach an all-time high. The title of this episode is a homage to the 1978 horror film Dawn of the Dead.
| 16 | 6 | "Jeepers Creepers" | Evan Katz | Anna Christopher | July 5, 2016 | 0.46 |
Audrey, Emma, and Noah team up to investigate a tip from Eddie at a nearby amusement park, which puts them in danger. While still in mourning over Jake's murder, Brooke follows through on some unfinished business with an old aquentince who secretly moved back to Lakewood. The title of this episode is a homage to the 2001 horror film Jeepers Creepers.
| 17 | 7 | "Let the Right One In" | Rodman Flender | Steve Yockey | July 12, 2016 | 0.40 |
Emma, pissed with Kieran for discussing her with Sheriff Acosta behind her back, joins Eli on a heated criminal adventure on the outskirts of town. Meanwhile, the killer lures Brooke and Audrey into a trap, posing as Branson. Zoe discovers Audrey's confession and decides to use it to her own advantage. The title of this episode is a homage to the 2008 romantic horror film Let the Right One In.
| 18 | 8 | "Village of the Damned" | Gil Kenan | Meredith Glynn | July 19, 2016 | 0.36 |
Emma suspects the killer is Eli and tries to find out at the 100th Lakewood Winter Carnival. Audrey's secret is exposed. Zoe and Noah consider taking their relationship to the next level. Maggie and Acosta keep their secret hidden, even though Acosta suspects his son is the murderer. The title of this episode is a homage to the 1960 sci-fi horror film Village of the Damned.
| 19 | 9 | "The Orphanage" | Leigh Janiak | Brian Sieve | July 26, 2016 | 0.35 |
Another bombshell secret causes a rift between Emma and Audrey. Noah tries in vain to determine who sent the email to Emma, causing Audrey to suspect Zoe. Kieran uncovers Ms. Lang's troubled past. While at a party, Emma and Audrey learn the new killer's motive. The title of this episode is a homage to the 2007 horror film The Orphanage.
| 20 | 10 | "The Vanishing" | Kevin Kölsch & Dennis Widmyer | Eoghan O'Donnell | August 2, 2016 | 0.32 |
The killer dispatches Emma and Audrey on a perilous and tension-filled scavenger hunt to find Noah, who falls victim to the killer's trap. Secrets from their past threaten Maggie and Acosta. Brooke and Stavro start growing close. Tension between Kieran and Eli reaches a new level. Kieran's aunt is being pursued by Mr. Maddox. The title of this episode is a homage to the 1988 psychological thriller The Vanishing.
| 21 | 11 | "Heavenly Creatures" | Jamie Travis | Anna Christopher | August 9, 2016 | 0.35 |
The Killer steals something private of Emma's. After losing his second girlfriend to the killer, Noah decides to end his obsession with the murders and considers shutting down "The Morgue". Emma digs deeper into why Eli was in Lakewood a month after Piper's killing spree. Sheriff Acosta questions Ms. Lang, who claims Emma is obsessed with Piper. Eli decides to blackmail Mr. Maddox, a decision that implicates Emma and Audrey. The title of this episode is a homage to the 1994 psychological thriller Heavenly Creatures.
| 22 | 12 | "When a Stranger Calls" | Patrick Lussier | Eoghan O'Donnell | August 16, 2016 | 0.34 |
Now considered Lakewood's Most Wanted, Emma and Audrey are taunted by the killer as they keep playing manipulative mind games as they finally try to uncover Piper's final surprise that's a bombshell. The title of this episode is a homage to the 1979 horror film When a Stranger Calls.
| 23 | 13 | "Halloween" | Oz Scott | Brian Sieve | October 18, 2016 | 0.30 |
Eight months after Kieran's arrest, the new Brandon James slasher kills him and a courthouse security guard. Shocked, the Lakewood survivors decide to take a vacation to Shallow Grove Island on the one-year anniversary of Piper's exposure. There, Stavo, Noah, and their editor Jeremy plan to research Anna Hobbs for a new book. Emma meets Alex Whitman, and they develop a romantic connection. At a party, a killer in an Anna Hobbs mask murders Billie and a store clerk named Sid. Jeremy goes missing, and Emma discovers Billie's body, with the killer taunting her in Brandon James' voice. The title of this episode is a homage to the 1978 slasher film Halloween.
| 24 | 14 | "Halloween II" | Oz Scott | Eoghan O'Donnell | October 18, 2016 | 0.30 |
The group's escape plan on Alex's stolen boat fails, with the town's sheriff getting killed and his severed head left at Alex's mansion. When Jeremy returns unharmed, he's locked in a closet, but he discovers a photo of the real Alex and Billie, exposing the imposter, Tom Martin, as the killer. Noah, Audrey, Brooke, and Stavo find a secret passage to Billie's house. There, Noah realizes Anna wasn't the killer; she defended herself against Reginald, who attacked her family, and Anna later died from her injuries. Emma briefly confronts Tom in disguise, but she locks him out and discovers the real Alex's corpse, unmasking Tom as the killer. Tom explains his motives, revealing his parents were murdered, and he wanted to eliminate anyone obstructing a potential relationship with Emma after seeing her on the news. He claims he didn't kill Kieran and doesn't know who did. Emma rejects him, leading to a fatal confrontation. Five months later, Noah continues to investigate Kieran's killer on his podcast. Emma's father visits Kieran's grave, and a man named "Mr. James" checks into a hotel. The title of this episode is a homage to the 1981 slasher film Halloween II.

=== Season 3: Resurrection (2019) ===
| No. overall | No. in season | Title | Directed by | Written by | Original release date | US viewers (millions) |
|---|---|---|---|---|---|---|
| 25 | 1 | "The Deadfast Club" | Kevin Kölsch & Dennis Widmyer | Brett Matthews | July 8, 2019 | 0.79 |
On Halloween night in 2010, 8-year-old Deion watches his twin, Marcus, being attacked by the "Hook Man" but runs away instead of helping. Eight years later, Deion is a high school football player being scouted by a university. Mysterious notes lead him to a confrontation with a stalker, resulting in detention with musician Amir, gothic horror fan Beth, activist Kym and her best friend Manny, and cheerleader Olivia. During detention, they are invited to a party by drug dealer Shane. Ghostface threatens the group, and Deion shares his past. Avery is attacked and killed, and they realise they're being pursued by a serial killer, making their survival uncertain, as per horror film rules. The title of this episode is both a portmanteau of the words "dead" and "breakfast", and also a homage to the 1985 American teen comedy The Breakfast Club.
| 26 | 2 | "Devil's Night" | Tanya Hamilton | Leigh Dana Jackson & Kristi Korzec | July 8, 2019 | 0.60 |
Kym receives a threatening call from Ghostface, who kills her neighbor. The next day, she shares her suspicion that Shane is Ghostface with her friends. Liv investigates and believes Deion's twin, Marcus, might be the killer. They are locked in the school and separate during an escape attempt, with Kym being pursued. Shane comes to help, but Deion confronts Ghostface, who hints at Marcus being alive. That night, Shane receives a threatening link from Ghostface, only to be attacked soon after and suffer a fatal overdose.
| 27 | 3 | "The Man Behind the Mask" | Darren Grant | Benjamin Raab & Deric A. Hughes | July 9, 2019 | 0.40 |
On Halloween, Jamal has conflicts with his father and Deion. Ghostface calls Deion, warning about Shane's death and urging him to find the truth where Marcus died. Deion, Amir and Liv trace a location with Luther, the Hook Man. Luther admits to injuring Marcus, but he escaped, later finding Marcus dead in a car trunk. Kym, Beth and Manny have a car dispute and Manny dies in a car explosion set by Ghostface. Ghostface kills Luther. Liv suspects the killer is someone in the group. The title of this episode is a reference to the 1986 song "He's Back (The Man Behind the Mask)", which was the theme song to the 1986 American slasher film Friday the 13th Part VI: Jason Lives.
| 28 | 4 | "Ports in the Storm" | William Scharpf | Penny Cox | July 9, 2019 | 0.34 |
At Manny's funeral, Kym receives flowers and a note from Ghostface, asking her to choose a group member to die. Deion decides they won't respond. Deion discovers a private phone and a receipt in Liv's house, leading to a confrontation. Reynolds takes Deion into the forest, gets attacked by Ghostface, and Deion flees. The group receives a message that Deion is chosen to die. Beth realizes Amir might be in danger since he chose Deion. Ghostface invades Beth's house, and they separate. Amir is killed in an elevator. Deion gets arrested for supposedly attacking Reynolds.
| 29 | 5 | "Blindspots" | Darren Grant | Sherman Payne | July 10, 2019 | 0.38 |
Liv visits her unstable father in the hospital. Deion is released by the police the next morning. Deion discovers DJ "Mr Fade" is throwing a party and asks Jamal to let him work there. Kym and Beth team up to find evidence that Liv is Ghostface, but they have conversations with her, learning about her private phone and her guilt over her parents' divorce. Deion finds Ghostface's mask in Jamal's trunk, and Jamal admits he's Mr. Fade and implies he's Ghostface, targeting Reynolds and Liv. Deion rushes to the hospital to stop Ghostface from harming Reynolds. Kym and Beth inform the police about Jamal, who gets attacked and injured by Ghostface at the party.
| 30 | 6 | "Endgame" | Kevin Kölsch & Dennis Widmyer | Brett Matthews | July 10, 2019 | 0.33 |
On the night of a big game, Deion hesitates to play due to the killer on the loose. However, with the police searching for Jamal, Kym and Liv encourage him to pursue his dreams. Deion returns to the team, and Ghostface keeps Jamal captive. On the way to the game, Beth and Kym receive a video showing Jamal's injury, demanding Deion go to "Earl's house." Deion realizes Ghostface is after him, as he had swapped identities with his brother Marcus, who died that night. Marcus saves Jamal, but Jamal reveals he is Ghostface, motivated by jealousy. Liv and Beth confront Marcus, with Beth as Jamal's accomplice. The confrontation ends with Beth's death. Months later, Kym and Hawkins attend college together, while Marcus (still using his original name Deion) goes to San Diego State University with Sherry and Liv. They decide not to reveal the truth about the twin exchange. Deion receives an ominous call and chooses to ignore it.

== Scream: If I Die ==
Scream: If I Die is a series of six webisodes released on MTV's official YouTube channel on May 23, 2016. Set between the first and second season, it features the Lakewood Six recording their final thoughts on Noah's podcast, The Morgue, in case they are killed by Piper's accomplice.

| No. | Title | Original release date |
|---|---|---|
| 1 | "Welcome to the Morgue" | May 23, 2016 |
| 2 | "Thank You Lakewood" | May 23, 2016 |
| 3 | "I Hope You Live" | May 23, 2016 |
| 4 | "One Surprise Left" | May 23, 2016 |
| 5 | "Thanks For Seeing The Real Me" | May 23, 2016 |
| 6 | "I Love All Of You... Mostly" | May 23, 2016 |

== Scream After Dark ==
Scream After Dark is a half-hour television aftershow hosted by Jeffery Self, which features behind the scenes footage, comedy sketches and interviews with the main cast from the series in which they discuss an episode of Scream following its original airing. The aftershow featured three installments which aired following the first, eighth and twelfth episodes of the second season.

| No. | Episode discussed | Original release date | US viewers (millions) |
|---|---|---|---|
| 1 | "I Know What You Did Last Summer" | May 30, 2016 | 0.19 |
Guests: Willa Fitzgerald, Bex Taylor-Klaus, John Karna, Amadeus Serafini, Carlson Young, and Kiana Brown
| 2 | "Village of the Damned" | July 19, 2016 | 0.20 |
Guests: Willa Fitzgerald, Bex Taylor-Klaus, John Karna, Carlson Young, Amadeus Serafini, Kiana Brown, Santiago Segura and Sean Grandillo
| 3 | "When a Stranger Calls" | August 16, 2016 | 0.15 |
Guests: Willa Fitzgerald, Bex Taylor-Klaus, John Karna, Carlson Young, Amadeus Serafini, Kiana Brown, Santiago Segura and Sean Grandillo

== Ratings ==
=== Season 1 ===
Viewership and ratings per episode of List of Scream episodes
| No. | Title | Air date | Rating (18–49) | Viewers (millions) |
|---|---|---|---|---|
| 1 | "Pilot" | June 30, 2015 | 0.5 | 1.03 |
| 2 | "Hello, Emma" | July 7, 2015 | 0.4 | 0.81 |
| 3 | "Wanna Play a Game?" | July 14, 2015 | 0.4 | 0.87 |
| 4 | "Aftermath" | July 21, 2015 | 0.3 | 0.80 |
| 5 | "Exposed" | July 28, 2015 | 0.3 | 0.75 |
| 6 | "Betrayed" | August 4, 2015 | 0.3 | 0.68 |
| 7 | "In the Trenches" | August 11, 2015 | 0.3 | 0.64 |
| 8 | "Ghosts" | August 18, 2015 | 0.3 | 0.65 |
| 9 | "The Dance" | August 25, 2015 | 0.3 | 0.55 |
| 10 | "Revelations" | September 1, 2015 | 0.3 | 0.76 |

=== Season 2 ===
Viewership and ratings per episode of List of Scream episodes
| No. | Title | Air date | Rating (18–49) | Viewers (millions) |
|---|---|---|---|---|
| 1 | "I Know What You Did Last Summer" | May 30, 2016 | 0.2 | 0.40 |
| 2 | "Psycho" | June 6, 2016 | 0.3 | 0.50 |
| 3 | "Vacancy" | June 13, 2016 | 0.2 | 0.35 |
| 4 | "Happy Birthday to Me" | June 20, 2016 | 0.1 | 0.27 |
| 5 | "Dawn of the Dead" | June 28, 2016 | 0.2 | 0.45 |
| 6 | "Jeepers Creepers" | July 5, 2016 | 0.2 | 0.45 |
| 7 | "Let the Right One In" | July 12, 2016 | 0.2 | 0.40 |
| 8 | "Village of the Damned" | July 19, 2016 | 0.2 | 0.36 |
| 9 | "The Orphanage" | July 26, 2016 | 0.2 | 0.35 |
| 10 | "The Vanishing" | August 2, 2016 | 0.2 | 0.32 |
| 11 | "Heavenly Creatures" | August 9, 2016 | 0.2 | 0.35 |
| 12 | "When a Stranger Calls" | August 16, 2016 | 0.2 | 0.34 |
| 13 | "Halloween" | October 18, 2016 | 0.1 | 0.30 |
| 14 | "Halloween II" | October 18, 2016 | 0.1 | 0.30 |

=== Season 3 ===
Viewership and ratings per episode of List of Scream episodes
| No. | Title | Air date | Rating (18–49) | Viewers (millions) |
|---|---|---|---|---|
| 1 | "The Deadfast Club" | July 8, 2019 | 0.4 | 0.79 |
| 2 | "Devil's Night" | July 8, 2019 | 0.3 | 0.60 |
| 3 | "The Man Behind the Mask" | July 9, 2019 | 0.2 | 0.40 |
| 4 | "Ports in the Storm" | July 9, 2019 | 0.2 | 0.34 |
| 5 | "Blindspots" | July 10, 2019 | 0.2 | 0.38 |
| 6 | "Endgame" | July 10, 2019 | 0.2 | 0.33 |

Scream : U.S. viewers per episode (thousands)

| Season | Episode number | | | | | | | | | | | | | | Average |
| Season | 1 | 2 | 3 | 4 | 5 | 6 | 7 | 8 | 9 | 10 | 11 | 12 | 13 | 14 | Average |
|---|---|---|---|---|---|---|---|---|---|---|---|---|---|---|---|
| 1 | 1030 | 810 | 870 | 800 | 750 | 680 | 640 | 650 | 550 | 760 | – | | | | 750 |
| 2 | 400 | 500 | 350 | 270 | 450 | 460 | 400 | 360 | 350 | 320 | 350 | 340 | 300 | 300 | 380 |
| 3 | 790 | 600 | 400 | 340 | 380 | 330 | – | | | | | | | | 470 |

Audience measurement performed by Nielsen Media Research
