= John Schaeffer =

John Schaeffer may refer to:

- John Schaeffer (art collector) (1941–2020), Australian art collector and businessman
- John Schaeffer (environmentalist) (born 1949), American solar power advocate
- John Schaeffer (trainer) (born 1951), American fitness trainer and author
- John Nevin Schaeffer (1882–1942), American classicist

== See also ==
- John Schaefer, American radio host and author
