= Julio Cesar Matthews =

American boxer

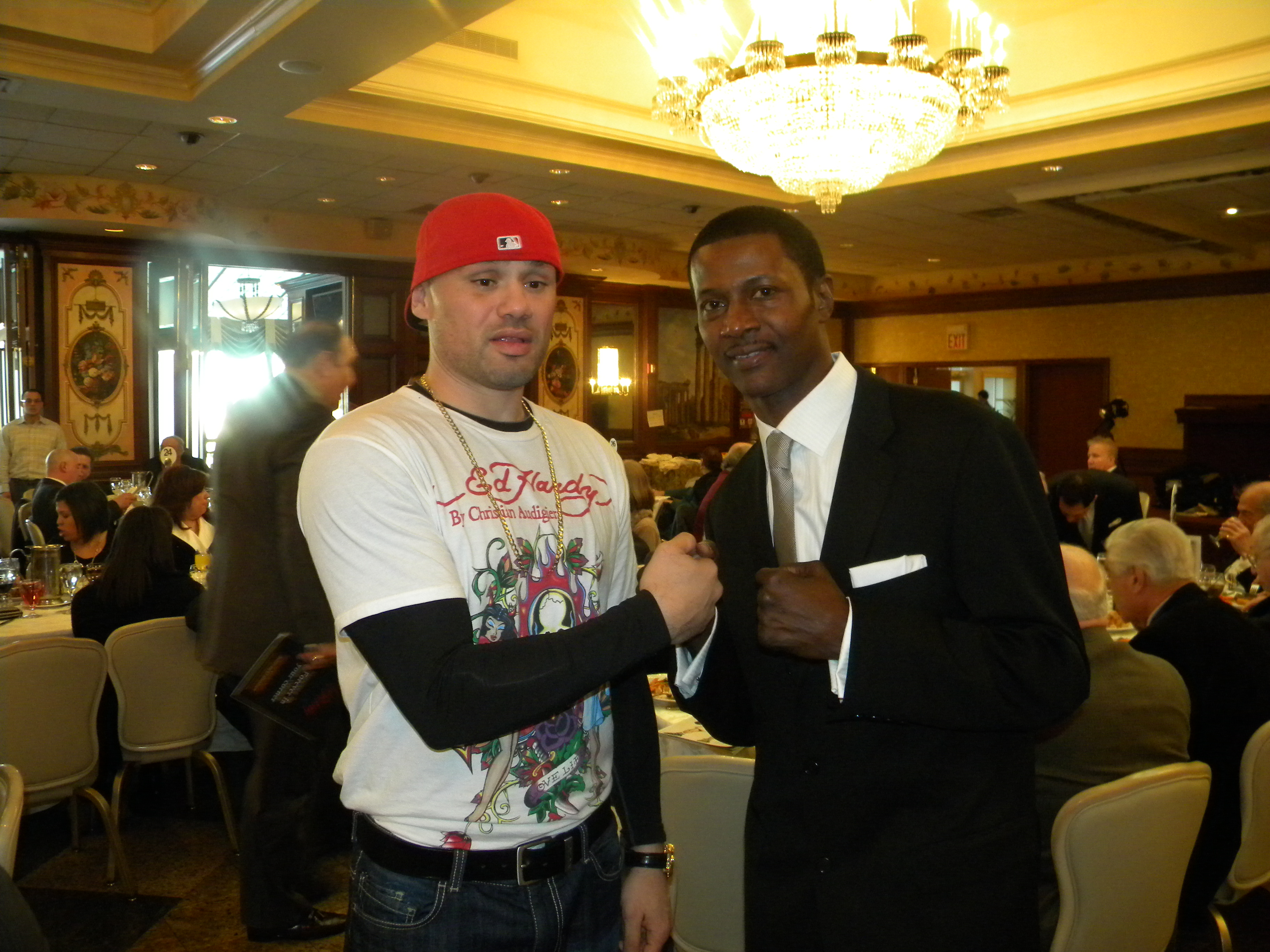
Julio Matthews and former world champion Mark Breland at the Ring 8 benefit dinner for injured and retired boxers in Howard Beach, New York, 2010

Julio Cesar Matthews (born February 2, 1970, Brooklyn, New York), was an undefeated world ranked southpaw professional cruiserweight boxer who promising career was derailed by troubles with the law.

== Boxing career ==
Matthews, of half Puerto Rican and half Irish descent, turned pro with a first-round knockout of Lamont Burgess in Allentown, Pennsylvania on November 14, 1996. After decisioning Troy Burbank in Allentown on February 20, 1997, troubles with the law, as well as getting shot in a random car shooting, derailed the boxing career of Matthews career for over a decade.

On March 15, 2008, at age 38, Matthews made a comeback, returning to the ring with a third-round knockout of Kevin Hood in Allentown. After knocking out Josh Harris in the first round in March 2008, and Chris Stallworth in the first round in September 2008, Matthews scored a third-round knockout of William Bailey in December 2008. Matthews decisioned William Gill over six rounds at The Blue Horizon in Philadelphia on March 3, 2009. He followed with a six-round decision win over Kamarah Pasley in May 2009, and a six-round decision over Harvey Jolly in Reading in December 2009. On June 13, 2010, Matthews made his final ring appearance, knocking down future USBA cruiserweight champion Garrett Wilson in the first round and winning a six-round decision in Philadelphia on a Don Elbaum fight card. His ring record had reached an astounding 10–0 with six knockouts at the age of 40, and he was continuing to demonstrate higher level boxing skills.

In a common law marriage for 16 years with four children, Matthews' career still had great promise. However, later in 2010 Matthews was returned to prison in Pennsylvania for parole violation, winding up in a situation similar to the late boxer Tony Ayala, Jr., perhaps ending his boxing career, while a candidate for release. Ayala was subsequently released.

Matthews, a resident of Reading, Pennsylvania, was trained renowned sports and fitness trainer John Schaeffer, and by martial artist 'Sensei' Danny Rivera, better known as the championship trainer of Roman Martinez, Elio Rojas, and Cesar Seda. Matthews, who came out of the boxing stable of Reading promoter Marshall Kauffman, was the longtime sparring partner of top cruiserweight contender Rob Calloway, also handled by Kauffman. Matthews was a principal sparring partner for cruiserweight champion Steve Cunningham, former world heavyweight champion Hasim Rahman, former world light heavyweight champions Antonio Tarver and Chad Dawson, and number one ranked heavyweight contenders Eddie Chambers and Bert Cooper. Despite his impressive record and resume of experience, Matthews had trouble finding a promoter due to his age, and had trouble finding opponents due to his considerable ring skill. Because of his name, Matthews is sometimes confused with the late boxer Julio César González. Matthews was also a physical conditioning specialist and athletic trainer who worked with amateur youth prior to his arrest.

== Rare footage of Julio Matthews ==
- Julio Cesar Matthews versus William Gill highlights (public domain on YouTube)
- 15rounds.com interview with Matthews before his last bout
- 15rounds.com interview with Matthews before his last bout (alt. site)
- MS Want TV highlight clip of June 13, 2010 fight card, includes Julio Cesar Matthews knockdown of Garrett Wilson
