= Pilate (disambiguation) =

Pilate most commonly refers to Pontius Pilate, the governor of Judea who sentenced Jesus to death, as well as the drummer for the band Vaginal Jesus.

Pilate may also refer to:

- Ignatius Pilate (r. 1591–1597), Syriac Orthodox patriarch of Antioch
- Pilate (band), now called Pilot Speed, a Canadian rock band formed in 1999 in Toronto, Ontario
- "Pilate" (song), a song by Pearl Jam from their fifth album, Yield, released in 1998
- Pilate, Haiti, a small town in Haiti
- Lago di Pilato, a glacial mountain lake, Italy

== People with the surname Pilate ==
- Felton Pilate (born 1952), American musician

== See also ==
- Pilates, physical fitness system
- Pilatus (disambiguation)
- Pilat (disambiguation)
- Pilati (disambiguation)
- Pilot (disambiguation)
