= Pilatus =

Pilatus may refer to:

== People ==
- Pontius Pilate (Latin: Pontius Pilatus, died 39 AD), Roman governor of Judea
- Leontius Pilatus (died 1366), Greek Calabrian scholar
- Rob Pilatus (1965–1998), artist and member of group Milli Vanilli

== Other uses ==
- Pilatus (mountain) (2128m a.s.l.), next to Lucerne in Switzerland
- PILATUS (detector), an X-ray area detector developed at the Swiss Light Source
- Pilatus (play), a 1917 play by Kaj Munk
- Pilatus Aircraft, a Swiss aircraft manufacturer
- Radio Pilatus, a private radio station of Central Switzerland
- Pilatus Railway, a mountain railway in Switzerland

== See also ==
- Pilat (disambiguation)
- Pilate (disambiguation)
- Pilates, physical fitness system
- Pilati (disambiguation)
