= Pilat (disambiguation) =

Pilat is a surname in central Europe.

Pilat may also refer to:

- Mont Pilat, a mountainous area in the east of the Massif Central of France
- Pilat Regional Natural Park, a protected area of Mont Pilat in southeastern France
- "Pilat" (Maalaala Mo Kaya), an episode of the drama anthology Maalaala Mo Kaya

== See also ==
- Pilate (disambiguation)
- Pilati (disambiguation)
- Pilatus (disambiguation)
