= Pilati =

Pilati is a surname. Notable people with the surname include:

- Auguste Pilati (1810–1877), French composer
- Mario Pilati (1903–1938), Italian composer
- Stefano Pilati (born 1965), head of design for Yves Saint Laurent (brand)

== See also ==
- (includes occurrences of "Pilati" as genitive form of "Pilate" e.g. "Uxor Pilati")
- Pilat (disambiguation)
- Pilate (disambiguation)
- Pilatus (disambiguation)
