= Pilot (surname) =

Pilot or Pilott, is a surname. Notable people with the surname include:

- Alain Pilot (b. 1962), Cameroon-French radio host for Radio France Internationale
- Alex Pilot (b. 1974), French television executive, founder of Nolife (TV channel)
- Ann Hobson Pilot, American classical harpist
- Brenda Pilott, New Zealand public servant
- Jean-Pierre Pilot, French musician, keyboardist for Indochine (band)
- Louis Pilot (1940-2016), Luxembourgian footballer and manager
- Mike Pilot ("Tha Mike", born 1975), American broadcaster
- Paul Pilot, Northern Ireland musician
- Rajesh Pilot (1945 - 2000), Indian politician, father of Sachin
- Robert Pilot a.k.a. Robert Wakeham Pilot (1898-1967), Canadian artist
- Sachin Pilot (born 1977), Indian politician, son of Rajesh
- Steve Pilot (born 1980) German Model, fitness trainer, nutritionist and author.
