= Slither =

Slither may refer to:

- Slithering, a form of limbless terrestrial locomotion

== Film and television ==
- Slither (1973 film), a comedy directed by Howard Zieff
- Slither (2006 film), a comedy horror film directed by James Gunn
- "Slither" (Sliders), an episode of Sliders
- "Slither" (Law & Order: Criminal Intent), an episode of Law & Order: Criminal Intent
- Slither (The Secret Circle), the 5th episode of the first season of the CW television series The Secret Circle

== Comics and games ==
- Slither (comics), a fictional Marvel Comics mutant villain
- Slither, a 1982 arcade game, or its ColecoVision port
- Slither.io, a 2016 massively multiplayer browser game featuring snakes

== Music ==
- Slither (album), a 2000 album by Earth Crisis
- "Slither" (song), a 2004 song by Velvet Revolver
- "Slither", a song by Metallica from ReLoad
- "Slither", a song by Opeth from Heritage

== Other uses ==
- Cold Slither
- Slither, a character in the book The Letter for the King
- Slitherlink, a logic puzzle developed by publisher Nikoli
