= Bound (The Secret Circle) =

- The Secret Circle episode
- Episode no.: Season 1 Episode 2
- Directed by: Liz Friedlander
- Written by: Kevin Williamson; Andrew Miller
- Production code: 2J6252
- Original air date: September 22, 2011

Guest appearances
- Adam J. Harrington; Logan Browning; Tom Butler

Episode chronology
← Previous "Pilot"	Next → "Loner"

"Bound" is the 2nd episode of the first season of the CW television series The Secret Circle, and the series' 2nd episode overall. It aired on September 22, 2011. The episode was written by Kevin Williamson & Andrew Miller. It was directed by Liz Friedlander.

== Plot ==
Cassie (Britt Robertson) finds her mom's Book Of Shadows hidden in her room along with a letter from her mother. Reading it, she knows now that the other kids were telling the truth about magic and them being witches. After that, she attempts to distance herself from them because she does not want to be part of the Circle or practice magic. She does not tell them that she found her mom's book either.

Dawn (Natasha Henstridge) gets a surprise when her father-in-law, Henry (Tom Butler), appears at her front door. She wonders if Henry has learned something about her plans with Charles (Gale Harold) and she calls him to make sure that he did not do anything so Henry would find out.

Later, we see that Ethan (Adam J. Harrington) was the one who called Henry after what happened between him and Charles, telling him that somehow Charles has his powers back or he found a way to use magic again. Henry asks Dawn directly about Charles but she denies everything saying that something like that is impossible. When he asks her about the kids and if they are practicing, she pretends to be surprised.

Diana (Shelley Hennig) insists that they have to bind the Circle so they can control their powers and she and Adam are trying to convince Cassie to work with them. Faye, on the other hand, (Phoebe Tonkin) does not want that since she enjoys the increase of her power and she is using it on any occasion just to have fun. Once though things get out of control and she pushes Sally (Logan Browning) over the deck.

Dawn, not having another choice, uses the crystal to save Sally so no one, especially Faye, gets into trouble. Henry, who is there, sees that Dawn has a crystal in her possession and he asks her to give it to him. When he says that he will let the elders know what is going on, Dawn kills him.

After what happened at the deck, those from the Circle do not want something like that to happen again and they agree with Diana that they have to bind their Circle so they can control their powers. The episode ends with the six members binding the Circle.

== Reception ==
=== Ratings ===
In its original American broadcast, "Bound" was watched by 2.12 million; down 0.93 from the previous episode.

=== Reviews ===
"Bound" received positive reviews.

Matt Richenthal from TV Fanatic rated the episode with 4.2/5 stating that it was, overall, a strong follow-up to an engrossing premiere. "There are books of shadows... and numerous generations of witches... and secrets... and spells... and literal sparks between two people that were only just strangers."

Jennifer Griffin from ScreenSpy stated that this episode was all about the magic and that the show continues to shine. "The show continues to shine, staying firmly on track with plot, character and pacing."

Katherine Miller from The A.V.Club gave a B rate to the episode.

== Feature music ==
In "Bound" we can hear the following songs:

- "Get burned" by Sleeper Agent
- "The HiHi's" by Double O Zero
- "Victory Dance" by My Morning Jacket
