= Loner (The Secret Circle) =

- The Secret Circle episode
- Zachary (Dave Baez) trying to kill Cassie (Britt Robertson)
- Episode no.: Season 1 Episode 3
- Directed by: Colin Bucksey
- Written by: Richard Hatem
- Production code: 2J6253
- Original air date: September 29, 2011

Guest appearances
- Logan Browning; Dave Baez; Zachary Abel

Episode chronology
← Previous "Bound"	Next → "Heather"

"Loner" is the 3rd episode of the first season of the CW television series The Secret Circle, and the series' 3rd episode overall. It aired on September 29, 2011. The episode was written by Richard Hatem and it was directed by Colin Bucksey.

== Plot ==
Now that the Circle has been bound, it seems that its members have lost their individual magic. The only way to do magic is to have at least two of the Circle's members present and that is something that Faye (Phoebe Tonkin) does not like at all.

There is a school dance coming and Sally (Logan Browning) asks Cassie (Britt Robertson) to help her organize it. Sally does not remember clearly what happened the previous night at the deck, so she tries to make Cassie tell her. Cassie avoids answering, saying that she did not see what exactly happened either.

Luke (Zachary Abel), a student at the school, likes Cassie and he asks Adam (Thomas Dekker) to introduce him to her. Adam does it and Luke asks Cassie to go to the dance with him, but she rejects him. Later, trying to find a way to stay away from Adam, she tells Luke that she will go with him to the dance.

Melissa (Jessica Parker Kennedy) takes the opportunity and uses the dance as an excuse to get closer to Nick (Louis Hunter) by asking him to the dance while Faye is trying to figure out a way to get her individual magic back.

Meanwhile, a man named Zachary (Dave Baez) appears in town and when he sees Cassie, he starts to ask questions about the Circle. He seems to know the truth about them and who they are and, as he says, he will not allow what happened in the past to happen again.

The members of the Circle search for information about him and they find out that he and his girlfriend Heather (a woman who died in the fire that killed the members of the adult's Circle sixteen years ago) were close friends of Amelia, Cassie's mom. Finding out about this, they believe that he blames their parents for Heather's death and now he is coming after them.

Dawn (Natasha Henstridge) and Charles (Gale Harold) find out that Zachary is back in town and he is asking about the Circle. They are trying to warn him to stay away from the kids. Charles meets him to warn him but Zachary hits him and goes to the school dance aiming to kill one of the kids.

The members of the Circle and Zachary confront him at the school and they manage to knock him down with magic. Dawn gets to the scene and they find an excuse for what happened to cover it up. Dawn tells them that she knows that man and that he has been vandalizing the school for years. Saying that she will take care of him now, she asks the kids to go back to the dance.

The episode ends with the members of the Circle trying to understand what Zachary meant when he said that Heather did not die in the fire but what Amelia did to her was much worse, while Dawn and Charles "mark" Zachary telling him to not get close to their children again.

== Reception ==
=== Ratings ===
In its original American broadcast, "Loner" was watched by 2.12 million; exact same rating as the previous episode.

=== Reviews ===
"Loner" received mediocre/positive reviews.

Matt Richenthal from TV Fanatic rated the episode with 4.2/5. "The show [The Secret Circle] almost suffers from following The Vampire Diaries because it's not as fast-paced as that series (is anything?), which can make it feel slow. But I prefer to think of it as slow developing and enough seeds have been planted for me to anxiously tune in each week, curious about what will soon grow."

Katherine Miller from The A.V. Club gave a C+ rate to the episode saying that "The Secret Circle is concussed".

Tyler Olson from Crimson Tear stated that episode didn't have the charm the first two had. "Overall, this episode just didn't seem to have the same charm as the first two episodes. Let's hope that as they find more information about what happened to their parents, they will find the path they need in order to get into the pace viewers need."

== Feature music ==
In the "Loner" episode we can hear the songs:

- "Style" by Phil Ogden Band
- "Girls Like You" by The Naked and Famous
- "Lovesong" by Adele
