= Pilot Township =

Pilot Township may refer to:

- Pilot Township, Kankakee County, Illinois
- Pilot Township, Vermilion County, Illinois
- Pilot Township, Cherokee County, Iowa
- Pilot Township, Iowa County, Iowa
- Pilot Township, Surry County, North Carolina
