= Pilot (Young Sheldon) =

- Young Sheldon episode
- Mary (left) says goodbye to Sheldon (center) as he begins his first day of high school.
- Episode no.: Season 1 Episode 1
- Directed by: Jon Favreau
- Written by: Chuck Lorre; Steven Molaro
- Production code: T12.15551
- Original air date: September 25, 2017

Episode chronology
← Previous —	Next → "Rockets, Communists, and the Dewey Decimal System"

"Pilot" is the series premiere of the American coming-of-age sitcom Young Sheldon. Written by series creators Chuck Lorre and Steven Molaro, it was directed by Jon Favreau and originally aired on CBS on September 25, 2017, to an audience of 17.21 million viewers. The series acts as a precursor to The Big Bang Theory, showcasing the childhood life of Sheldon Cooper (Iain Armitage).

The episode introduces Sheldon, the series' primary protagonist, a child prodigy, along with his twin sister Missy (Raegan Revord) and his older brother Georgie (Montana Jordan). The three of them live with their mother Mary (Zoe Perry), and George (Lance Barber), their hardworking father. In the episode, Sheldon starts his first day of high school in the ninth grade, where he insults his teachers and informs students of their rule-breaking. He tries to find his place in the new school, and Georgie deals with having a younger sibling in his class.

CBS announced in November 2016 that a spin-off of The Big Bang Theory focusing on Sheldon as a young boy was in production. Described as "a Malcolm in the Middle-esque single-camera family comedy", it was intended to air in the 2017–18 season, alongside The Big Bang Theory. Since release, "Pilot" has received positive reception from critics. In 2019, the episode was nominated for the Outstanding Achievement in Comedy Pilot Casting award at the 34th Artios Awards.

== Plot ==
Sheldon Cooper, a child prodigy, is working on his train set when his mother, Mary, calls him for dinner. As he does not go to the dinner table, his sister Missy forces Sheldon to immediately go to the dinner table by telling him she will lick his toothbrush. At dinner, they discuss Sheldon going to high school in the ninth grade, and how he is not old enough and is only going due to his advanced intelligence. They discuss who in the family would go to church the next day, and Sheldon, Mary, and Missy agree to go. At the house, Sheldon reads a student handbook for high school while Mary forces him to go outside and play. Despite his fears, he reluctantly goes outside but quickly goes back inside. Sheldon and Missy then hear their parents fight about money, but Sheldon reassures Missy that they have no money problems.

The next day, Missy and Sheldon try to prepare for school, but Sheldon cannot find his bowtie, so Mary thinks Georgie, his older brother, stole it. George, Sheldon's dad, tells Mary that he took the bowtie because he does not want Sheldon to be bullied in school, but she insists that Sheldon should wear what he wants. Sheldon and Mary travel to school, where they talk about Sheldon's smartness. Once at school, Mary changes her mind and convinces Sheldon to remove his bowtie. She walks Sheldon to him and Georgie's homeroom, where she leaves him. His homeroom teacher introduces herself, but Sheldon exposes his classmates who are breaking the dress code, leaving Georgie embarrassed. At the principal's room, Sheldon's teachers discuss Sheldon insulting them, such as commenting on their life skills and try to convince their parents to let Sheldon go to a different school, but his parents say that they do not have another choice for his education. After a fight with a football player who insulted him, Georgie does not want to play football anymore; George understands him but tells him to continue playing anyway. Sheldon goes home and watches TV where George and Sheldon then talk about trying to ignore others breaking rules. George reveals that he got fired, and he says he is mostly angry but sad. At dinner, they say grace and Sheldon goes to RadioShack the next day after Mary promised him to go there if he removed his bowtie.

== Production ==
=== Development ===
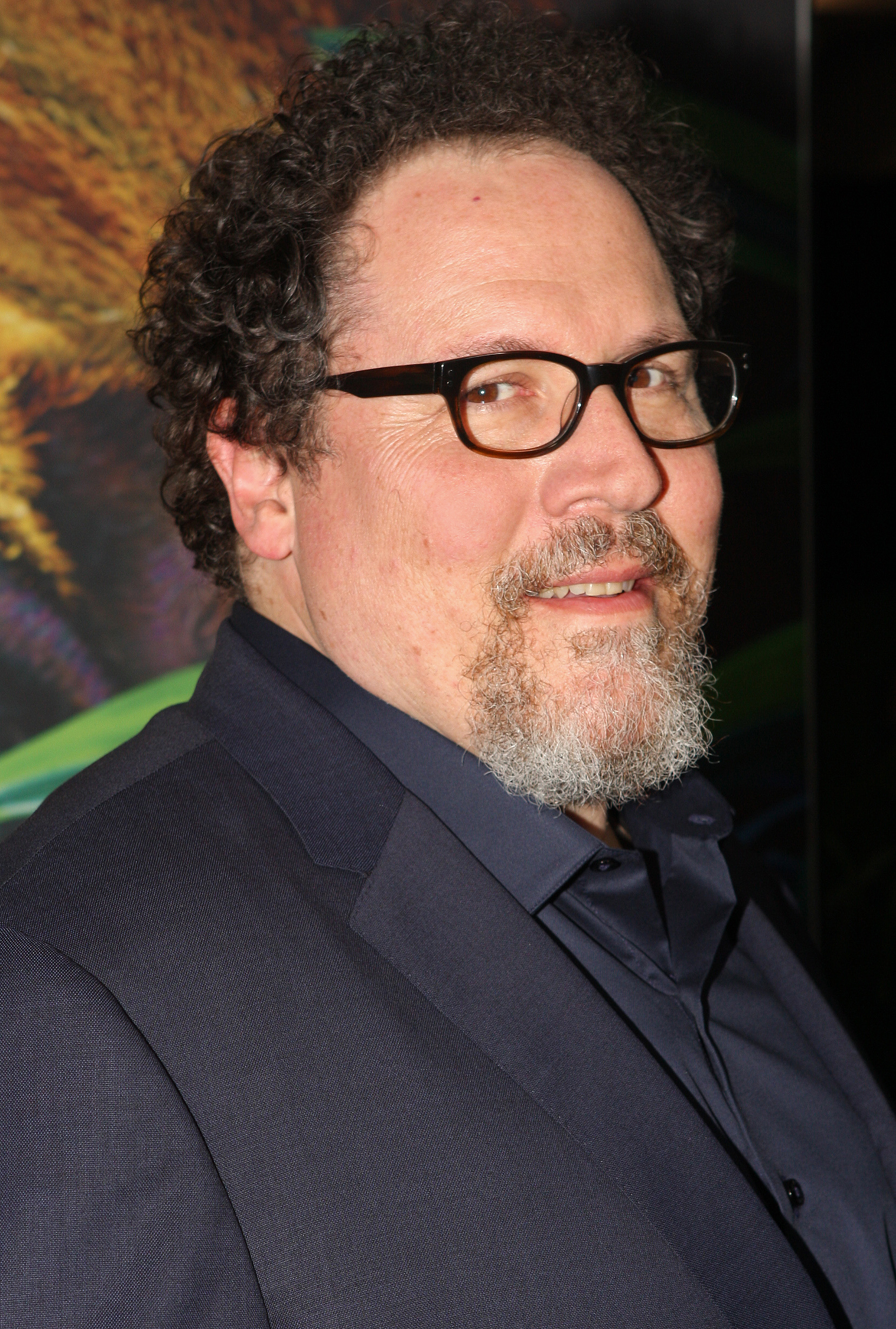
Jon Favreau exclusively directed the pilot.

In November 2016, it was reported that CBS was in negotiations to create a prequel of The Big Bang Theory centered on Sheldon Cooper as a young boy. Narrated as "a Malcolm in the Middle-esque single-camera family comedy," the show would be executive produced by The Big Bang Theory co-creator Chuck Lorre and producer Steven Molaro, another The Big Bang Theory co-creator, with Bill Prady expected to be involved in some capacity. Young Sheldon was intended to air in the 2017–18 season alongside The Big Bang Theory. The initial idea for the series came from Jim Parsons, Sheldon's actor in The Big Bang Theory, who suggested it to The Big Bang Theory producers. On March 13, 2017, CBS ordered the spin-off Young Sheldon series, which was created by Lorre and Molaro. Jon Favreau directed and executive produced the pilot, which both Lorre and Molaro wrote. Parsons, Lorre, Molaro and Todd Spiewak also serve as executive producers on the series, for Chuck Lorre Productions and Warner Bros. Television.

=== Casting ===
Casting began in January 2017, and in March 2017, it was announced that Iain Armitage and Zoe Perry would star as Sheldon and Mary Cooper respectively. Armitage auditioned for the role of Shelden by sending audition tapes, with his mother sending the tapes to the producers. According to Lorre, the production team "set the bar very high", thinking "no one's going to be able to do this". Alongside the announcement of CBS ordering the spin-off, it was confirmed that Lance Barber, Montana Jordan, and Raegan Revord had been cast as George, Georgie, and Missy, respectively. Additionally, Parsons provides narration for the series as adult Sheldon.

== Release and reception ==
"Pilot" first aired on CBS on September 25, 2017 at 8:30 p.m. Eastern Standard Time in the United States, and was watched by 17.21 million viewers during its original broadcast. The next episode, "Rockets, Communists, and the Dewey Decimal System", marked a decrease of over four million viewers, which aired on November 2, 2017, and was watched by 12.66 people. After "Pilot" premiered, the series was picked up for a full season, consisting of 22 episodes.

"Pilot" received positive reviews from critics, becoming the most watched comedy debut in 15 years. Ken Tucker of Yahoo! Entertainment said that, with the supervision of Lorre and Molaro, Sheldon was "smart without being too supercilious and awkward without being foolish," adding that "the taunts he endures are just mean enough—not mean verging on cruel, as much of the humor on Lorre's Two and a Half Men was." Tucker added that the scenes at home were "even better" and that the Cooper family had clever casting. He concluded that Young Sheldon "has a certain Wonder Years glow to it" with a "nostalgic voice-over" that "chronicles a boy's youth" and a "single-camera, no-studio-audience effort." Scott Pierce of The Salt Lake Tribune stated that it was "a very good pilot", and praised Armitage's acting as Sheldon. Meanwhile Daniel Fienberg of The Hollywood Reporter spoke more negatively on it, claiming that the character of Sheldon was "amusing" but said the show "needs a conceptual adjustment".

Under the Radar's Lily Moeyari said that the show was a "nostalgic family sitcom that is billing itself as a too-obvious cross between The Wonder Years and Doogie Howser, M.D., the former for the look-back retro factor and the latter for the child genius aspect," rating it 5 out of 10 stars. Den of Geek's Sophia Soto ranked the episode as the seventh best in the series, stating "The first episode of a show sets the scene perfectly for what’s to come and the pilot of Young Sheldon does exactly that." "Pilot" was nominated for the Outstanding Achievement in Comedy Pilot Casting award at the 34th Artios Awards, though it lost to The Marvelous Mrs. Maisel (2017–2023).
