= Pilot (The Secret Circle) =

- The Secret Circle episode
- Cassie (Britt Robertson) doing a spell for the first time with Adam's (Thomas Dekker) help.
- Episode no.: Season 1 Episode 1
- Directed by: Liz Friedlander
- Written by: Kevin Williamson
- Teleplay by: Andrew Miller
- Production code: 296808
- Original air date: September 15, 2011
- Running time: 42 mins (approx.)

Guest appearances
- Emily Holmes; Adam Harrington

Episode chronology
← Previous —	Next → "Bound"

"Pilot" is the pilot episode of the CW television series The Secret Circle and the first episode of the show overall. The original teleplay was written by Andrew Miller, but was heavily edited by Kevin Williamson. It originally aired on Thursday, September 15, 2011.

== Plot ==
Cassie (Britt Robertson) is run off of the road by another driver on the way home which leads to a flat tire. Unknown to Cassie, her mother, Amelia Blake (Emily Holmes), is about to see the last of this world. A stranger (Gale Harold) appears outside Cassie's residence playing with matches as a fire breaks out in the kitchen inside. Cassie's mother dies in what she believes is an accident.

One month later, Cassie, still dealing with her mother's death, moves to her grandmother's (Ashley Crow) house in Chance Harbor. Cassie meets new people on her first day of school: Adam Conant (Thomas Dekker) a handsome boy who seems to have this pull to Cassie, Diana Meade (Shelley Hennig) Adam's girlfriend, Faye Chamberlain (Phoebe Tonkin) a young and all around rebel, Melissa Glaser (Jessica Parker Kennedy) Faye's quiet sidekick, and Nick Armstrong (Louis Hunter) her next door neighbor.

Unknown to Cassie, this group of kids makes up a coven of witches. With Cassie now in town they can all experience the full effects of their magic. Faye sets Cassie's car on fire to see if Cassie knows she's a witch. When Cassie can't escape her car, Adam saves her.

The next day, Cassie tries looking for her grandmother but runs into Diana and her father, Charles, the man who is responsible for the fire that killed Cassie's mother. Diana takes Cassie to an abandoned house in the woods and explains that they, along with Adam, Faye, Melissa, and Nick, are all witches. They call this the Circle (with Diana as the de facto leader) and is only at its best if Cassie joins. Cassie doesn't believe them, saying that witches aren't real, and runs from the house. Adam follows her and they have a moment in the woods where their energy joins together causing all of the water droplets to float. Adam leans in to kiss Cassie, but she pulls away and runs off.

Cassie ponders whether she will join them or not, and all while dark secrets surface such as Diana's father, Charles, is the man that was outside Amelia's house. Along with these secrets, Cassie is revealed to be more of a puppet for the adult generation of witches that were thought to have sworn off witchcraft after a bad accident long ago.

== Reception ==
=== Ratings ===
In its original American broadcast, "Pilot" of the show was watched by 3.05 million.

=== Reviews ===
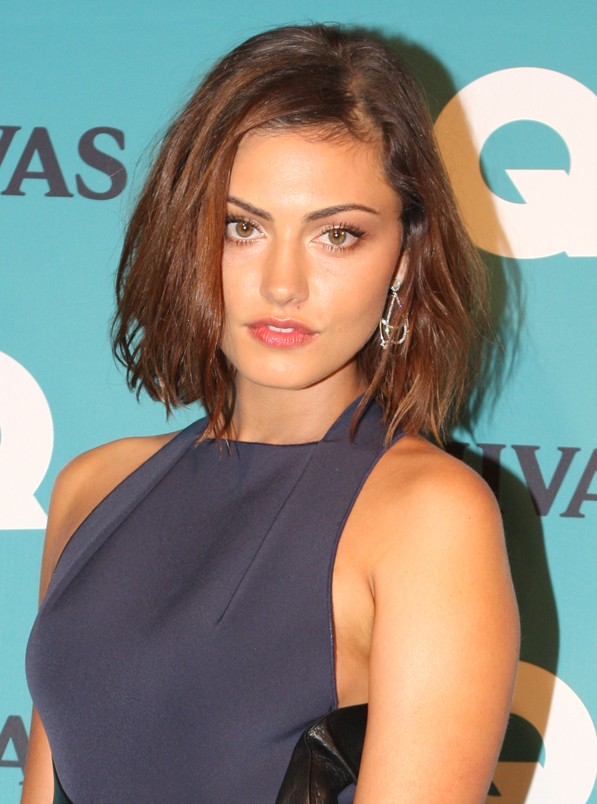
Phoebe Tonkin portrays Faye Chamberlain

The "Pilot" of the show received mostly positive reviews and, as the appended reviews attest, there was a clear comparison to The Vampire Diaries show.

Matt Richenthal from TV Fanatic rated the Pilot episode with 4.7/5 stating that if there was ever an ideal comparison to The Vampire Diaries, it would be The Secret Circle. "...it's never clear how a book will translate to the big screen. Based on the series premiere, however, I can safely say: so far, so mysteriously, enjoyably, attractively good."

Rowan Kaiser and Katherine Miller from The A.V. Club gave a B− grade to the episode. Katherine said that at this moment the show wasn’t exactly a revolution in suspense but is not without promise while Rowan said that the "Pilot" was slick and has found himself really wanting to know what will happen next. "This show could really work well, and even if not, it should still be eminently watchable."

Laurel Brown from Buddy TV stated that those witches arrived as a force to be reckoned with. "The pilot for The Secret Circle is occasionally a bit slow as it builds up the story. But that's actually OK -- the slow build gives us a chance to really get to know the central players in this melodrama. The magic, meanwhile, is thoroughly impressive (just wait until you see everything they do with rain!)."

== Feature music ==
In the "Pilot" episode we can hear the songs:

- "Young Blood" by The Naked and Famous
- "I Go Away" by MNDR
- "A Heavy Abacaus" by The Joy Formidable
- "We Won't Run" by Sarah Blasko
- "Wrong Time, Wrong Planet" by Does it Offend You, Yeah?
- "DNA" by The Kills
