= Pilot Cars Limited =

Pilot Cars and Motor Schools Ltd.
- Formerly: Pilot Works and Friction Cars, Ltd.
- Company type: Private
- Industry: Automotive
- Predecessor: Motor Schools Limited
- Founded: 1911
- Founder: Turberville Smith
- Defunct: 1916 (Deleted from register)
- Fate: Liquidation / Dissolution
- Headquarters: London, United Kingdom
- Key people: T. W. K. Clarke (Aviation Instructor)
- Parent: Motor Schools Limited
- Footnotes / references Known for the use of friction drive systems.

Pilot Works and Friction Cars, Ltd. was a short lived British automobile company that produced cars from 1911 to 1912. The first and final Pilot automobiles were made by its holding company Motor Schools Limited between 1909 and 1911, and again in 1914.

== Origin ==
The company was started by Turberville Smith of London. Smith had originally formed Motor Schools Limited, a driving and maintenance school. The first Pilot automobile was a motorcab was made by the driving school between 1909 and 1911.

As a side note. Motor Schools Limited also taught Aviation under Mr T W K Clarke, aeronautical engineer, an aviation pioneer, and founder of the first aeronautical engineering works in Britain.

== Cars ==
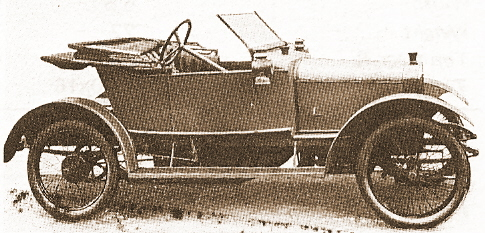
1913 Pilot 10hp

In 1909, Motor School Ltd displayed two cars at the Olympia Motor Show. One was a chassis with a 4-cylinder White and Poppe engine of 16 hp (12 kW) for £275 and the other a landaulet mounted on the same type of chassis for £425. The following year they displayed another 4-cylinder car, this one with a Hillman engine and belt and cone-pulley drive. Both of these were probably the only cars produced with these specifications.

In 1911 Pilot Cars Ltd was formed to produce a smaller car. This had a Coventry-Simplex single-cylinder engine of only 7 hp (5.2 kW), in addition to friction drive. In 1912–1914, yet another engine was employed in their cars — a Chapuis-Dornier 4-cylinder of 10 hp (7.5 kW). This two-seater car also used a friction drive. It was shown at the 1912 and 1913 Olympia Motor Shows. This appears to be the last car produced with Pilot Cars Ltd having been placed in liquidation in 1912.

There was a new company formed in March 1914 called Pilot Cars and Motor Schools Ltd. According to Graces Guide this was formed out of a merger of Motor School Ltd and Friction Cars Ltd. This company was deleted from the companies register in 1916.

== See also ==
- Brass Era car
- List of car manufacturers of the United Kingdom
