= Schaffrillas Productions =

American YouTube channel

- Born: James Phyrillas; January 9, 1998 (age 28); Reading, Pennsylvania, U.S.
- Education: Temple University
- Years active: 2015–present

YouTube information
- Channel: Schaffrillas Productions
- Genres: Film; animation; theater; video games
- Subscribers: 2.06 million
- Views: 574 million
- Last updated: May 2, 2026

Schaffrillas Productions is an American YouTube channel created by James Phyrillas (born January 9, 1998). The channel, formerly focused around YouTube Poop content, is known for its film and animation analysis videos and rankings, also occasionally covering video games and musical theater. His channel avatar is Tamatoa from Disney's Moana.

== Early life ==
James Phyrillas was born on January 9, 1998, in Reading, Pennsylvania. He is of Greek heritage. Phyrillas attended Antietam Middle-Senior High School and later Temple University, majoring in economics with a minor in communication.

== Career ==
The Schaffrillas Productions channel was created in 2015 by James Phyrillas and Christopher Schaffer, while they were juniors at Antietam. Phyrillas and Schaffer had been friends since elementary school. They initially made it as a place to store the videos they created for their digital media class, combining their last names to create the name of the channel. The channel initially was home to short comedy sketches and live-action reenactments of episodes of SpongeBob SquarePants. The channel eventually shifted its focus to YouTube Poop content, involving a storyline in which the character Oscar from the film Shark Tale rises through the ranks of a shark mafia.

Phyrillas eventually grew tired of making YouTube Poops, as the editing process took time. In 2018, he began to make film analysis videos—one video about Disney villains went viral, doubling his subscriber count. This led Phyrillas to rethink his channel direction entirely, with him pivoting entirely to film in the end.

Several of his videos have been cited in academic journals and theses examining film and musicals.

== Personal life ==
Phyrillas has stated that he is biromantic and asexual. He is a Greek Orthodox Christian and is a member of the Berks County chapter of the American Hellenic Educational Progressive Association.

On January 29, 2023, James Phyrillas, his younger brother Patrick, and Christopher Schaffer were involved in a car crash with their car and a tractor-trailer in Upper Macungie Township. The intersection in which the crash happened had no traffic signal, as it was under construction. James, who was driving the car, survived, but he and the other driver were taken to the hospital in critical condition, with James having a punctured lung and fractured ribs. Both Patrick and Schaffer, who were common guests on the Schaffrillas Productions channel, were pronounced dead at the scene. Upon returning from the hospital, Phyrillas tweeted that he would continue to make videos following the crash.
