= Pilotmotorenwerke Bannewitz =

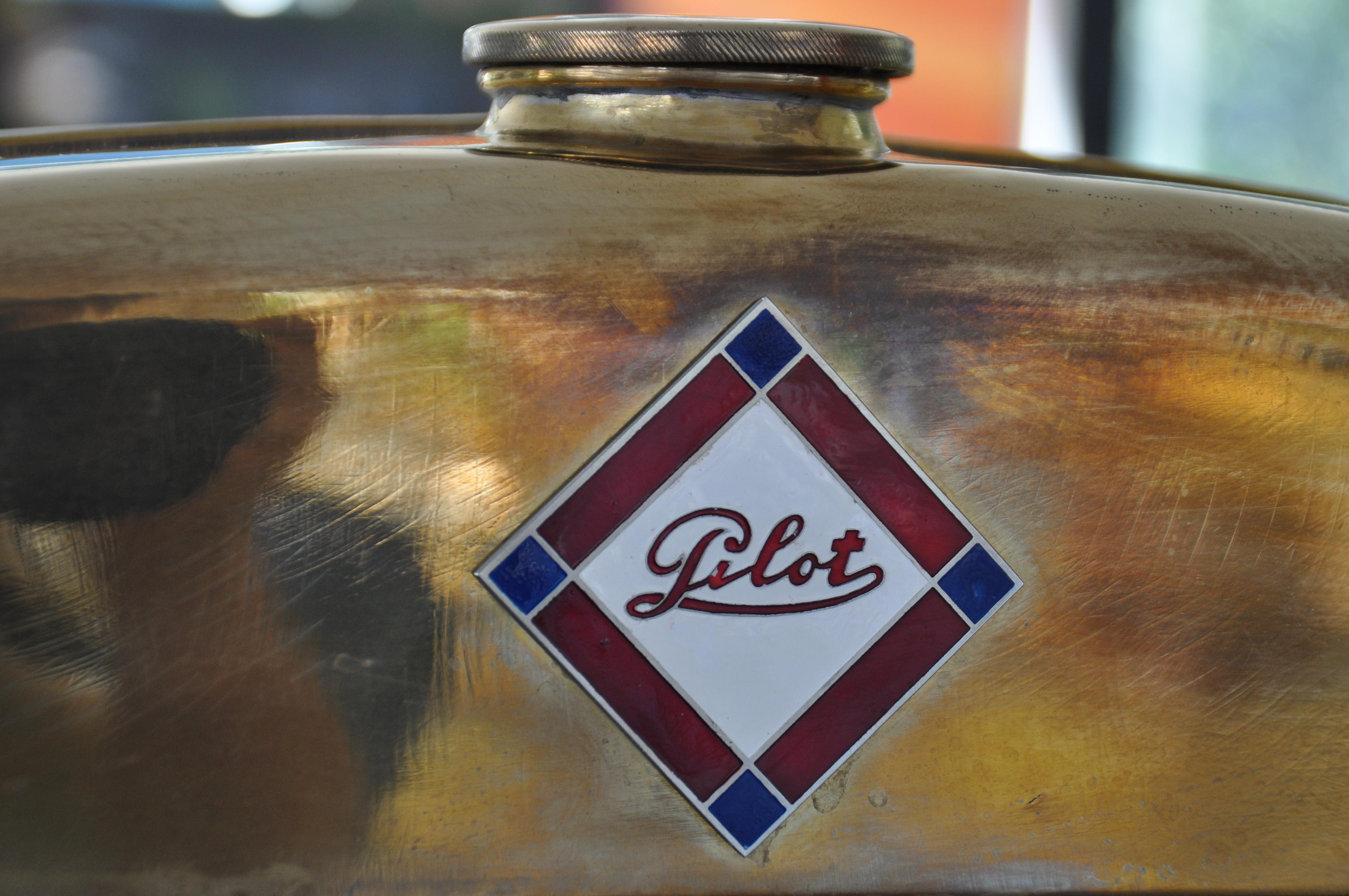
Pilot-Wagen logo

Pilotmotorenwerke Bannewitz (Pilot-Wagen) was a German carmaker that debuted in 1919 with the "Pilot" make. It went out of business in 1931.

== Origin ==
After World War One the Chemische Fabrik Orloff Hansen, which had previously manufactured munitions, changed to small car manufacturing under the amended company name Pilotmotorenwerke Bannewitz. Walter Wippermann managed the company. Its first car called the Pilot was the 6/22PS. The 1500 cc engine was the first German 16-valve four-cylinder engine in series production.

== Take-over ==
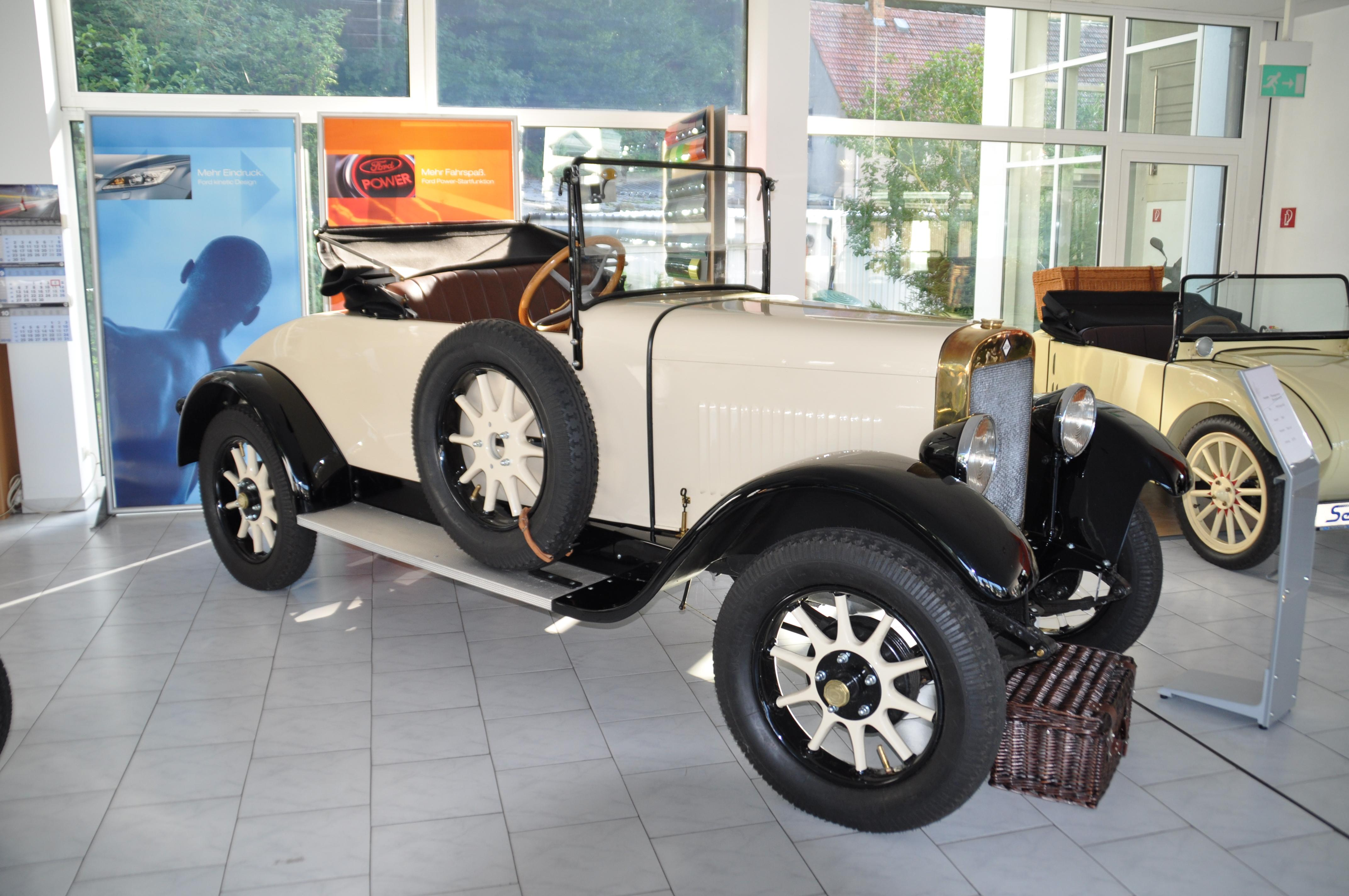
Pilot 6/30

By 1924 the company had 150 employees and the cars were selling well. At the end of 1924 the rail carriage-maker, Sächsische Waggonfabrik Werdau AG, acquired a majority share holding and manufacture of the vehicle bodies was moved to Werdau. A new type, the 6/30, was introduced at this time and revised to a 6/36 in 1927. In addition to both open and closed cars, a delivery van was also produced for the short time the marque was in existence.

== Demise ==
Due to the continuing poor economic conditions in Germany at the time, the auto making firm was put into liquidation by Sächsische Waggonfabrik on 19 May 1928 after failed acquisition negotiations with Elite-Diamantwerke Brand-Erbisdorf AG. Sächsische Waggonfabrik then concentrated on rail production. Parts and repair operations continued under the administrator until 1931, when operations finally ceased.

== Existing cars ==
Three Pilot vehicles are known to be still in existence. Two are privately owned by Autohaus Seifert GmbH in Freital and the third is on display in the Dresden Transport Museum. The Dresen car does not have a standard Pilot body, but one made by Gläser in Dresden.
