= John Schaeffer (trainer) =

American boxing trainer

John Schaeffer with boxer Gabriel Bracero

John Schaeffer (born March 14, 1951) is an American sports and fitness trainer, author and nutritionist. He became the athletic trainer of Apolo Ohno in 2002. He specializes in sports conditioning (physical exercise), nutrition and weight management. He is a five time World Powerlifting and Superheavyweight Kickboxing Champion. He was also a co-owner of LJ's Fitness.

== Fitness books by John Schaeffer ==
- The Winning Factor
- The Winning Factor For Women
