= Mike Pilot =

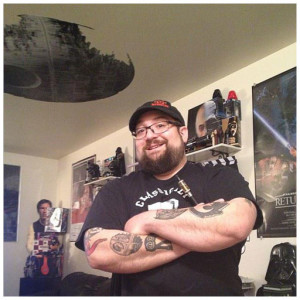
- Mike Pilot in 2013
- Born: Michael J. Pilat; July 29, 1975 (age 50); Reading, Pennsylvania, U.S.
- Occupation: Broadcaster
- Years active: 1996 – present
- Known for: Full Of Sith, The Mediocre Show, Obviously Oblivious, The Awful Show
- Spouse: Ariana Pilat
- Children: Anyah Pilat
- Website: www.mikepilot.com

Michael J. Pilat (born July 29, 1975), known as Mike Pilot and "Tha Mike", is an American broadcaster. He is the creator and co-host of the Full Of Sith Star Wars Podcast, along with Bryan Young and Bobby Roberts.

== Biography ==
Mike Pilot was born and grew up in Reading, Pennsylvania. After college, Pilot worked as a steelworker and radio DJ at a Top 40 station. After sustaining injuries in a car accident, he learned the basics of web development and design. He continues to work in that field

Pilot started his podcasting career in 2006 with The Awful Show podcast (2006–2009). Three years and almost four million downloaded shows later, he retired from The Awful Show and became the co-host for The Mediocre Show, along with Eric Tomorrow. In June 2009, Pilot also created the Obviously Oblivious podcast.

A notable guest on Obviously Oblivious was Neil deGrasse Tyson. A notable guest on Full Of Sith, which began in 2013, was Travis Beacham.

As of 2014, Pilot and his family live in Cumru Township, Berks County, Pennsylvania.
