= Pilot (Scream) =

- Scream episode
- The series' central cast
- Episode no.: Season 1 Episode 1
- Directed by: Jamie Travis
- Story by: Kevin Williamson
- Teleplay by: Jill Blotevogel; Dan Dworkin; Jay Beattie
- Cinematography by: Alejandro Martínez
- Editing by: Peter Gvozdas; Tony Solomons
- Original air date: June 30, 2015
- Running time: 44 minutes

Guest appearances
- Bella Thorne as Nina Patterson; Bobby Campo as Seth Branson; Tom Maden as Jake Fitzgerald; Brianne Tju as Riley Marra; Sosie Bacon as Rachel Murray; Max Lloyd-Jones as Tyler O'Neill; Sharisse Baker-Bernard as Tracy Patterson; Anna Grace Barlow as Daisy Anderson / Young Maggie

Episode chronology
← Previous —	Next → "Hello, Emma"

"Pilot" is the first episode of the first season of the American anthology slasher television series, Scream. The series is based on the American slasher film franchise of the same name. The series revolves around the main character, Emma Duvall, played by Willa Fitzgerald, who lives in the town of Lakewood. She quickly becomes the center of a series of murders amongst teens who know her. The massacre seems to be related to the Brandon James murders, who was supposedly obsessed with Emma's mother Maggie Duvall (Tracy Middendorf).

The episode revolves around the aftermath of Nina Patterson's gruesome murder at the hands of an unknown killer after she uploaded a video of Audrey, a closeted bicurious teen, kissing another girl. Nina's close-knit friends hold a memorial party for her, meanwhile Emma and her mother are taunted by the killer.

The episode aired on June 30, 2015 on MTV and received mixed reviews from critics, though critics and fans of the film series praised the opening sequence and Bella Thorne's performance, comparing the scene to the opening scene in the first Scream film.

== Plot ==
After posting a shaming video online of classmate Audrey Jensen (Bex Taylor-Klaus) and Rachel Murray (Sosie Bacon) kissing, Nina Patterson (Bella Thorne) is dropped off at her house by her boyfriend Tyler O'Neill (Max Lloyd-Jones). While Nina is home alone, the Lakewood Slasher impersonates Tyler and taunts Nina with video clips and text messages sent from Tyler's phone. Nina's relaxation in the hot tub is interrupted when Tyler's severed head is suddenly thrown into the water. She screams and jumps out of the pool. After failing to call for help, she runs to try and open the doors, when the Lakewood Slasher appears behind her and slashes across her back. She then tries to run but is attacked by the Lakewood Slasher, who slits her throat and throws her in the pool.

The next morning, Emma Duval (Willa Fitzgerald) is studying with her boyfriend Will Belmont (Connor Weil). At George Washington High School, Audrey commiserates with her friend Noah Foster (John Karna) about the viral video. Emma and Will discuss the video with their friends Brooke Maddox (Carlson Young), Riley Marra (Brianne Tju), and Jake Fitzgerald (Tom Maden). In Language Arts class, Emma and her friends take notice of new transfer student Kieran Wilcox (Amadeus Serafini), who recently moved to Lakewood. Nina's parents return home and discover their daughter's dead body in the pool.

Word of Nina's death spreads throughout the school. One rumor regarding the Lakewood Slasher's identity suggests that Brandon James has returned to Lakewood. Serial killer history enthusiast Noah tells the story of how Brandon James, was a teenager with Proteus syndrome who died twenty-one years earlier. Brandon had fallen in love with a girl named Daisy, but when she became frightened by his appearance following an unmasking at the school's Halloween dance, a group of drunken jocks beat him up. Brandon then killed five students. The police later shot Brandon during an arranged meeting with Daisy on the pier. Daisy is revealed to secretly be Emma's mother Maggie Duvall (Tracy Middendorf), who works as the coroner in the town of Lakewood.

The students learn that Tyler is missing and is a suspect in Nina's murder. In an effort to renew their former friendship, Emma invites Audrey to a party Brooke is throwing as a memorial for Nina. Will and Jake have a tense confrontation with each other over a secret involvement they had with Nina. Language Arts teacher Seth Branson (Bobby Campo) tries unsuccessfully to end his affair with Brooke. Back at home, Emma finds a package on her doorstep addressed to Daisy. After Emma leaves with Will for Brooke's party, Maggie opens the package and finds a note that reads, "Emma looks just like you at that age" along with a bloody animal heart.

Meanwhile, at the party, Audrey and Emma later bond while having a poolside conversation. Riley takes an interest in Noah. Maggie calls Sheriff Clark Hudson (Jason Wiles) about the anonymous package. Clark promises to track down Emma's father Kevin. Noah continues discussing Brandon James, Nina's murder, and teenage horror tropes with other partygoers. Brooke hints that Will and Nina had some sort of connection and Emma realizes that Will slept with Nina. After confronting Will, Emma walks off alone and finds Kieran in the greenhouse. Kieran explains the family circumstances that brought him to Lakewood. Kieran and Emma end up kissing.

Having previously passed out, Noah regains consciousness to find himself stripped to his underwear and alone on the pier. Noah goes into the lake and is pulled under the water. Kieran rescues Noah. Noah insists that someone grabbed him and pulled him under water. Kieran drives Emma home. Kieran reveals that the sheriff is his father. Meanwhile, the Lakewood Slasher stalks Audrey as she visits with her girlfriend Rachel.

At school, Sheriff Hudson asks Noah to come to the station for questioning regarding Brandon James. Riley and Noah continue flirting with each other. Emma visits Audrey and admits that she was with Nina when the shaming video was recorded. The Lakewood Slasher taunts Emma over the phone as she walks home. As Noah continues explaining tropes to Riley, Jake is revealed to have a secret video of Nina on his computer, Audrey is revealed to have a picture of Brandon James unmasked and Noah is seen hiding a bloody wound on his forehead.

== Reception ==
The series premiere received mixed reviews from critics. The episode was watched by 1.03 million viewers and was considered a success for MTV.

In a positive review, David Hinckley from New York Daily News awarded the pilot four out of five stars and stated, "Happily, Scream maintains a sense of humor, reinforced with snappy, self-aware pop culture dialogue." Similarly, Brian Lowry of Variety commended the show's ability to maintain suspense "without much actually happening during the rest of the episode", noting its use of music, but expressing skepticism if the series could maintain its originality. Conversely, David Wiegand of the San Francisco Chronicle panned the episode and gave it one out of four stars, criticizing the acting performances as "bland, robotic, and uninteresting" as well as its apparent lack of racial diversity. In a mixed review, Mark Perigard of the Boston Herald gave the episode a C+, writing, "There are a few scares here, but while the Scream films kept audiences jumping, Scream: The TV Series risks putting viewers to sleep."
